= 2022–23 Hallyburton Johnstone Shield =

Domestic cricket competition

- Dates: 19 November 2022 – 4 March 2023
- Administrator: New Zealand Cricket
- Cricket format: 50 over
- Tournament format(s): Round robin and final
- Champions: Wellington Blaze (18th title)
- Participants: 6
- Matches: 31
- Most runs: Kate Ebrahim (588)
- Most wickets: Gabby Sullivan (21)

The 2022–23 Hallyburton Johnstone Shield was a 50-over women's cricket competition, the sixth season with the name Hallyburton Johnstone Shield, that took place in New Zealand. It ran from November 2022 to March 2023, with 6 provincial teams taking part. Wellington Blaze won the tournament, beating Canterbury Magicians in the final.

The tournament ran alongside the 2022–23 Super Smash.

== Competition format ==
Teams played in a double round-robin in a group of six, therefore playing 10 matches overall. Matches were played using a one day format with 50 overs per side. The top two in the group advanced to the final.

The group worked on a points system with positions being based on the total points. Points were awarded as follows:

Win: 4 points
Tie: 2 points
Loss: 0 points.
Abandoned/No Result: 2 points.
Bonus Point: 1 point awarded for run rate in a match being 1.25x that of opponent.

== Points table ==
Pos	Team	Pld	W	L	T	NR	BP	Pts	NRR
1	Wellington Blaze	10	6	1	0	3	5	35	1.317
2	Canterbury Magicians	10	5	3	0	2	3	27	0.594
3	Central Hinds	10	4	5	0	1	2	20	0.000
4	Auckland Hearts	10	2	3	0	5	1	19	−0.827
5	Otago Sparks	10	3	5	0	2	0	16	−0.626
6	Northern Districts	10	2	5	0	3	2	16	−0.797

Source: New Zealand Cricket

advanced to the Final

== Fixtures ==
Source: New Zealand Cricket

19 November 2022
Scorecard

Canterbury Magicians	v	Wellington Blaze

Match Abandoned
Rangiora Recreation Ground, Rangiora
Umpires: Eugene Sanders and N Louw

- No toss.
- No play possible due to rain.
- Points: Canterbury Magicians 2, Wellington Blaze 2

19 November 2022
Scorecard

Otago Sparks; 238/8 (50 overs)	v	Northern Districts; 119/1 (22 overs)
Kate Ebrahim 100* (150); Brooke Halliday 4/41 (10 overs)		Bernadine Bezuidenhout 62* (68); Gemma Adams 1/22 (4 overs)

Northern Districts won by 47 runs (DLS)
Cobham Oval, Whangārei
Umpires: Christelle High and Derek Walker

- Northern Districts won the toss and elected to field.
- Northern Districts innings curtailed at 22 overs due to rain; target was 73.
- Points: Northern Districts 5, Otago Sparks 0

19 November 2022
Scorecard

Auckland Hearts; 86/9 (20 overs)	v	Central Hinds; 89/4 (17 overs)
Saachi Shahri 34 (40); Jess Watkin 3/13 (4 overs)		Natalie Dodd 32* (36); Amberly Parr-Thomson 2/17 (4 overs)

Central Hinds won by 6 wickets
Pukekura Park, New Plymouth
Umpires: Allen Stanley and Billy Bowden

- Central Hinds won the toss and elected to field.
- Match reduced to 20 overs per side due to rain.
- Points: Central Hinds 4, Auckland Hearts 0

20 November 2022
Scorecard

Central Hinds	v	Auckland Hearts

Match Abandoned
Pukekura Park, New Plymouth
Umpires: Allen Stanley and Billy Bowden

- No toss.
- No play possible due to rain.
- Points: Auckland Hearts 2, Central Hinds 2

20 November 2022
Scorecard

Wellington Blaze; 178/9 (44 overs)	v	Canterbury Magicians; 51 (19.2 overs)
Jess McFadyen 31 (54); Gabby Sullivan 4/31 (9 overs)		Kate Anderson 17 (35); Caitlin King 3/1 (1 over)

Wellington Blaze won by 127 runs
Rangiora Recreation Ground, Rangiora
Umpires: Eugene Sanders and N Louw

- Canterbury Magicians won the toss and elected to field.
- Match reduced to 44 overs per side due to rain.
- Points: Wellington Blaze 5, Canterbury Magicians 0

20 November 2022
Scorecard

Northern Districts; 308/4 (45.3 overs)	v	Otago Sparks
Bernadine Bezuidenhout 101 (95); Caitlin Blakely 2/40 (6 overs)

No Result
Cobham Oval, Whangārei
Umpires: Christelle High and Derek Walker

- Otago Sparks won the toss and elected to field.
- No further play possible due to rain.
- Points: Northern Districts 2, Otago Sparks 2

26 November 2022
Scorecard

Canterbury Magicians; 242/9 (50 overs)	v	Northern Districts; 110 (27.3 overs)
Natalie Cox 47 (67); Marama Downes 3/55 (10 overs)		Caitlin Gurrey 50 (70); Sarah Asmussen 3/35 (6 overs)

Canterbury Magicians won by 132 runs
Rangiora Recreation Ground, Rangiora
Umpires: Eugene Sanders and Kim Cotton

- Northern Districts won the toss and elected to field.
- Points: Canterbury Magicians 5, Northern Districts 0

26 November 2022
Scorecard

Otago Sparks; 245/9 (50 overs)	v	Central Hinds; 243/9 (50 overs)
Kate Ebrahim 68 (115); Claudia Green 2/43 (10 overs)		Jess Watkin 50 (56); Caitlin Blakely 4/48 (10 overs)

Otago Sparks won by 2 runs
University of Otago Oval, Dunedin
Umpires: Derek Walker and John Dempsey

- Central Hinds won the toss and elected to field.
- Points: Otago Sparks 4, Central Hinds 0

26 November 2022
Scorecard

Auckland Hearts	v	Wellington Blaze

Match Abandoned
Colin Maiden Park, Auckland

- No toss.
- Match initially postponed due to heavy rainfall in Auckland. Match rescheduled for 29 January 2023, but abandoned due to further heavy rainfall in Auckland, with points shared.
- Points: Auckland Hearts 2, Wellington Blaze 2

17 December 2022
Scorecard

Otago Sparks; 155/5 (32.1 overs)	v	Wellington Blaze
Kate Ebrahim 68* (80); Leigh Kasperek 2/24 (6 overs)

No Result
Basin Reserve, Wellington
Umpires: David Henderson and N Louw

- Wellington Blaze won the toss and elected to field.
- Match reduced to 48 overs per side due to rain.
- No further play possible due to rain.
- Points: Otago Sparks 2, Wellington Blaze 2

17 December 2022
Scorecard

Auckland Hearts; 136 (36.3 overs)	v	Canterbury Magicians; 56/0 (12 overs)
Katie Perkins 64 (86); Lea Tahuhu 5/24 (9.3 overs)		Laura Hughes 25* (52)

No Result
Eden Park Outer Oval, Auckland
Umpires: R Allen and T Semmens

- Canterbury Magicians won the toss and elected to field.
- Canterbury Magicians innings reduced to 33 overs; target was 104.
- No further play possible due to rain.
- Points: Auckland Hearts 2, Canterbury Magicians 2

17 December 2022
Scorecard

Northern Districts; 318/7 (50 overs)	v	Central Hinds; 195 (42.3 overs)
Caitlin Gurrey 183 (145); Melissa Hansen 3/74 (10 overs)		Kerry Tomlinson 61 (103); Lucy Boucher 4/39 (10 overs)

Northern Districts won by 123 runs
Bay Oval, Mount Maunganui

- Central Hinds won the toss and elected to field.
- Points: Northern Districts 5, Central Hinds 0

18 December 2022
Scorecard

Wellington Blaze; 140/5 (31 overs)	v	Otago Sparks; 109 (24.5 overs)
Thamsyn Newton 42 (68); Gemma Adams 2/26 (5 overs)		Olivia Gain 21 (20); Nicole Baird 2/1 (2 overs)

Wellington Blaze won by 45 runs (DLS)
Basin Reserve, Wellington
Umpires: David Henderson and N Louw

- Wellington Blaze won the toss and elected to bat.
- Match reduced to 35 overs per side due to rain.
- Wellington Blaze innings interrupted at 29.3 overs by rain; match reduced to 31 overs per side.
- Otago Sparks target revised to 155 from 31 overs.
- Points: Wellington Blaze 5, Otago Sparks 0

18 December 2022
Scorecard

Auckland Hearts; 116 (41.3 overs)	v	Canterbury Magicians; 120/3 (18.3 overs)
Josie Penfold 23 (34); Gabby Sullivan 3/14 (9 overs)		Amy Satterthwaite 49* (51); Josie Penfold 2/29 (4 overs)

Canterbury Magicians won by 7 wickets
Eden Park Outer Oval, Auckland
Umpires: Raoul Allen and Tina Semmens

- Canterbury Magicians won the toss and elected to field.
- Points: Canterbury Magicians 5, Auckland Hearts 0

14 January 2023
Scorecard

Canterbury Magicians; 227 (49.2 overs)	v	Northern Districts; 211 (46.3 overs)
Kate Anderson 54 (59); Brooke Halliday 3/38 (9.2 overs)		Eimear Richardson 85 (96); Gabby Sullivan 2/36 (7 overs)

Canterbury Magicians won by 16 runs
Hagley Oval, Christchurch
Umpires: Anvesh Achanta and JT Blunt

- Northern Districts won the toss and elected to field.
- Points: Canterbury Magicians 4, Northern Districts 0

22 January 2023
Scorecard

Otago Sparks; 272/5 (50 overs)	v	Central Hinds; 235 (46.3 overs)
Bella James 101 (120); Ashtuti Kumar 3/48 (8 overs)		Natalie Dodd 83 (91); Caitlin Blakely 4/45 (10 overs)

Otago Sparks won by 37 runs
Saxton Oval, Saxton, Nelson

- Otago Sparks won the toss and elected to bat.
- Points: Otago Sparks 4, Central Hinds 0

4 February 2023
Scorecard

Northern Districts; 99 (26 overs)	v	Central Hinds; 103/4 (26.1 overs)
Carol Agafili 27 (24); Ocean Bartlett 3/23 (6 overs)		Natalie Dodd 39* (72); Nensi Patel 3/28 (10 overs)

Central Hinds won by 6 wickets
Seddon Park, Hamilton
Umpires: Chris Brown and Christelle High

- Northern Districts won the toss and elected to bat.
- Points: Central Hinds 5, Northern Districts 0

6 February 2023
Scorecard

Wellington Blaze; 303/5 (50 overs)	v	Auckland Hearts; 226 (44.3 overs)
Leigh Kasperek 87 (76); Bella Armstrong 2/58 (10 overs)		Saachi Shahri 92 (92); Xara Jetly 4/37 (10 overs)

Wellington Blaze won by 77 runs
Basin Reserve, Wellington
Umpires: Glen Walklin and Kiran Challa

- Auckland Hearts won the toss and elected to field.
- Points: Wellington Blaze 5, Auckland Hearts 0

18 February 2023
Scorecard

Wellington Blaze; 156 (38.2 overs)	v	Northern Districts; 137 (45 overs)
Thamsyn Newton 57 (85); Charlotte Sarsfield 3/34 (9.2 overs)		Nensi Patel 34 (55); Xara Jetly 3/24 (9 overs)

Wellington Blaze won by 19 runs
Hutt Recreation Ground, Lower Hutt
Umpires: Glen Walklin and Tyron Davies

- Wellington Blaze won the toss and elected to bat.
- Points: Wellington Blaze 4, Northern Districts 0

18 February 2023
Scorecard

Canterbury Magicians; 279/8 (50 overs)	v	Central Hinds; 258 (49 overs)
Kate Anderson 141* (120); Ocean Bartlett 4/60 (10 overs)		Jess Watkin 96 (77); Sarah Asmussen 5/36 (10 overs)

Canterbury Magicians won by 21 runs
Hagley Oval, Christchurch
Umpires: Billy Bowden and Christelle High

- Canterbury Magicians won the toss and elected to bat.
- Points: Canterbury Magicians 4, Central Hinds 0

18 February 2023
Scorecard

Auckland Hearts; 308/5 (50 overs)	v	Otago Sparks; 243 (46.4 overs)
Katie Perkins 113* (123); Gemma Adams 1/40 (7 overs)		Caitlin Blakely 78* (85); Holly Huddleston 4/49 (10 overs)

Auckland Hearts won by 65 runs
University of Otago Oval, Dunedin
Umpires: Pete Pasco and Tina Semmens

- Auckland Hearts won the toss and elected to bat.
- Points: Auckland Hearts 5, Otago Sparks 0

19 February 2023
Scorecard

Canterbury Magicians; 242/8 (50 overs)	v	Central Hinds; 243/7 (49 overs)
Amy Satterthwaite 103* (115); Melissa Hansen 2/35 (7 overs)		Jess Watkin 57 (61); Gabby Sullivan 3/40 (9 overs)

Central Hinds won by 3 wickets
Hagley Oval, Christchurch
Umpires: Billy Bowden and Christelle High

- Canterbury Magicians won the toss and elected to bat.
- Points: Central Hinds 4, Canterbury Magicians 0

19 February 2023
Scorecard

Auckland Hearts; 300/7 (50 overs)	v	Otago Sparks; 272/9 (50 overs)
Katie Perkins 94 (107); Gemma Adams 4/44 (9 overs)		Felicity Leydon-Davis 59 (55); Holly Huddleston 3/44 (10 overs)

Auckland Hearts won by 28 runs
University of Otago Oval, Dunedin
Umpires: Pete Pasco and Tina Semmens

- Auckland Hearts won the toss and elected to bat.
- Points: Auckland Hearts 4, Otago Sparks 0

19 February 2023
Scorecard

Wellington Blaze; 277/8 (50 overs)	v	Northern Districts; 123 (32.1 overs)
Caitlin King 77 (87); Nensi Patel 4/58 (10 overs)		Marama Downes 27 (36); Natasha Codyre 3/24 (6 overs)

Wellington Blaze won by 154 runs
Hutt Recreation Ground, Lower Hutt
Umpires: Glen Walklin and Kiran Challa

- Wellington Blaze won the toss and elected to bat.
- Points: Wellington Blaze 5, Northern Districts 0

25 February 2023
Scorecard

Canterbury Magicians; 317/5 (50 overs)	v	Otago Sparks; 205 (45.1 overs)
Amy Satterthwaite 75 (66); Caitlin Blakely 2/49 (8 overs)		Kate Ebrahim 89 (133); Sarah Asmussen 4/42 (10 overs)

Canterbury Magicians won by 112 runs
Queenstown Events Centre, Queenstown
Umpires: JT Blunt and Pete Pasco

- Otago Sparks won the toss and elected to field.
- Points: Canterbury Magicians 5, Otago Sparks 0

25 February 2023
Scorecard

Wellington Blaze; 115 (26.3 overs)	v	Central Hinds; 118/1 (25.3 overs)
Rebecca Burns 40 (41); Jess Watkin 3/11 (3.3 overs)		Jess Watkin 63* (51); Leigh Kasperek 1/23 (4 overs)

Central Hinds won by 9 wickets
Fitzherbert Park, Palmerston North
Umpires: Glen Walklin and RCR Combe

- Central Hinds won the toss and elected to field.
- Points: Central Hinds 5, Wellington Blaze 0

25 February 2023
Scorecard

Auckland Hearts	v	Northern Districts

Match Abandoned
Colin Maiden Park, Auckland

- No toss.
- No play possible due to rain.
- Points: Auckland Hearts 2, Northern Districts 2

26 February 2023
Scorecard

Central Hinds; 218/9 (50 overs)	v	Wellington Blaze; 220/2 (35.2 overs)
Natalie Dodd 64 (84); Leigh Kasperek 3/42 (10 overs)		Jess McFadyen 96* (101); Flora Devonshire 2/22 (4 overs)

Wellington Blaze won by 8 wickets
Fitzherbert Park, Palmerston North
Umpires: Glen Walklin and RCR Combe

- Wellington Blaze won the toss and elected to field.
- Points: Wellington Blaze 5, Central Hinds 0

26 February 2023
Scorecard

Auckland Hearts	v	Northern Districts

Match Abandoned
Colin Maiden Park, Auckland

- No toss.
- No play possible due to rain.
- Points: Auckland Hearts 2, Northern Districts 2

26 February 2023
Scorecard

Otago Sparks; 265/4 (50 overs)	v	Canterbury Magicians; 228 (46 overs)
Kate Ebrahim 106* (181); Jodie Dean 1/18 (3 overs)		Amy Satterthwaite 66 (85); Kate Ebrahim 3/33 (8 overs)

Otago Sparks won by 37 runs
Queenstown Events Centre, Queenstown
Umpires: JT Blunt and Pete Pasco

- Canterbury Magicians won the toss and elected to field.
- Points: Otago Sparks 4, Canterbury Magicians 0

== Final ==
4 March 2023
Scorecard

Wellington Blaze; 258/8 (50 overs)	v	Canterbury Magicians; 254/7 (50 overs)
Maddy Green 106 (106); Gabby Sullivan 4/54 (10 overs)		Amy Satterthwaite 66 (72); Leigh Kasperek 4/46 (10 overs)

Wellington Blaze won by 4 runs
Queenstown Events Centre, Queenstown
Umpires: Chris Brown and Christelle High

- Wellington Blaze won the toss and elected to bat.

== Statistics ==
=== Most runs ===
Player	Team	Matches	Innings	Runs	Average	HS	100s	50s
Kate Ebrahim	Otago Sparks	10	9	588	98.00	106*	2	4
Amy Satterthwaite	Canterbury Magicians	8	7	406	81.20	103*	1	3
Jess Watkin	Central Hinds	9	9	346	43.25	96	0	4
Katie Perkins	Auckland Hearts	6	6	343	68.60	113*	1	3
Kate Anderson	Canterbury Magicians	10	9	343	42.87	141*	1	2

Source: ESPN Cricinfo

=== Most wickets ===
Player	Team	Overs	Wickets	Average	BBI	5w
Gabby Sullivan	Canterbury Magicians	81.3	21	15.04	4/31	0
Leigh Kasperek	Wellington Blaze	61.1	20	12.85	4/46	0
Lea Tahuhu	Canterbury Magicians	47.0	14	11.71	5/24	1
Sarah Asmussen	Canterbury Magicians	68.0	14	23.78	5/36	1
Jess Watkin	Central Hinds	69.3	13	22.84	3/11	0

Source: ESPN Cricinfo
