= 2013–14 New Zealand Women's One-Day Competition =

- Dates: 7 December 2013 – 25 January 2014
- Administrator: New Zealand Cricket
- Cricket format: 50 over
- Tournament format(s): Round robin and final
- Champions: Otago Sparks (2nd title)
- Participants: 6
- Matches: 31
- Most runs: Suzie Bates (679)
- Most wickets: Leigh Kasperek (18)

The 2013–14 New Zealand Women's One-Day Competition was a 50-over women's cricket competition that took place in New Zealand. It ran from December 2013 to January 2014, with 6 provincial teams taking part. Otago Sparks beat Auckland Hearts in the final to win the competition. Suzie Bates and Leigh Kasperek, both from Otago Sparks, were the leading run-scorer and the highest wicket-taker, respectively.

The tournament ran alongside the 2013–14 New Zealand Women's Twenty20 Competition.

== Competition format ==
Teams played in a double round-robin in a group of six, therefore playing 10 matches overall. Matches were played using a one day format with 50 overs per side. The top two in the group advanced to the final.

The group worked on a points system with positions being based on the total points. Points were awarded as follows:

Win: 4 points
Tie: 2 points
Loss: 0 points.
Abandoned/No Result: 2 points.
Bonus Point: 1 point awarded for run rate in a match being 1.25x that of opponent.

== Points table ==
Team	Pld	W	L	T	NR	A	BP	Pts	NRR
Auckland Hearts	10	7	1	0	1	1	5	37	1.633
Otago Sparks	10	7	3	0	0	0	5	33	0.705
Wellington Blaze	10	6	3	0	1	0	4	30	1.011
Canterbury Magicians	10	4	5	0	0	1	2	20	–0.511
Northern Spirit	10	2	7	0	0	1	0	10	–0.888
Central Hinds	10	1	8	0	0	1	0	6	–1.640

Source: ESPN Cricinfo

Advanced to the Final

== Final ==
25 January 2014
Scorecard

Auckland Hearts; 245 (49.5 overs)	v	Otago Sparks; 246/7 (49.5 overs)
Katie Perkins 93* (103); Suzie Bates 3/40 (9 overs)		Suzie Bates 99 (112); Paula Gruber 2/50 (10 overs)

Otago Sparks won by 3 wickets
Melville Park, Auckland
Umpires: Ashley Mehrotra and Kathy Cross

- Auckland Hearts won the toss and elected to bat.

== Statistics ==
=== Most runs ===
Player	Team	Matches	Innings	Runs	Average	HS	100s	50s
Suzie Bates	Otago Sparks	11	11	679	75.44	102*	1	5
Nicola Browne	Northern Spirit	9	9	482	68.85	108	1	3
Sara McGlashan	Auckland Hearts	10	9	387	48.37	90	0	5
Rachel Priest	Wellington Blaze	10	10	369	73.80	89	0	3
Sophie Devine	Wellington Blaze	10	8	364	72.80	102	1	3

Source: ESPN Cricinfo

=== Most wickets ===
Player	Team	Overs	Wickets	Average	BBI	5w
Leigh Kasperek	Otago Sparks	80.0	18	20.55	6/8	1
Georgia Guy	Auckland Hearts	73.0	15	16.86	3/8	0
Emma Campbell	Otago Sparks	92.0	15	24.33	3/21	0
Hayley Jensen	Canterbury Magicians	69.0	14	18.14	4/21	0
Lucy Doolan	Wellington Blaze	74.0	14	21.71	3/25	0

Source: ESPN Cricinfo
