= 2018–19 Hallyburton Johnstone Shield =

- Dates: 17 November 2018 – 9 March 2019
- Administrator: New Zealand Cricket
- Cricket format: 50 over
- Tournament format(s): Round robin and final
- Champions: Central Hinds (3rd title)
- Participants: 6
- Matches: 31
- Most runs: Natalie Dodd (652)
- Most wickets: Deanna Doughty (21)

The 2018–19 Hallyburton Johnstone Shield was a 50-over women's cricket competition, the second season with the name Hallyburton Johnstone Shield, that took place in New Zealand. It ran from November 2018 to March 2019, with 6 provincial teams taking part. Central Hinds beat Auckland Hearts in the final to win the tournament, their third 50-over title.

The tournament ran alongside the 2018–19 Super Smash.

== Competition format ==
Teams played in a double round-robin in a group of six, therefore playing 10 matches overall. Matches were played using a one day format with 50 overs per side. The top two in the group advanced to the final.

The group worked on a points system with positions being based on the total points. Points were awarded as follows:

Win: 4 points
Tie: 2 points
Loss: 0 points.
Abandoned/No Result: 2 points.
Bonus Point: 1 point awarded for run rate in a match being 1.25x that of opponent.

== Points table ==
Team	Pld	W	L	T	NR	A	BP	Pts	NRR
Central Hinds	10	8	2	0	0	0	6	38	1.399
Auckland Hearts	10	8	2	0	0	0	6	38	0.904
Wellington Blaze	10	6	4	0	0	0	3	27	0.527
Otago Sparks	10	4	6	0	0	0	2	18	–1.023
Canterbury Magicians	10	3	7	0	0	0	1	13	–0.585
Northern Spirit	10	1	9	0	0	0	0	4	–1.343

Source: ESPN Cricinfo

Advanced to the Final

== Final ==
9 March 2019
Scorecard

Central Hinds; 200 (49.4 overs)	v	Auckland Hearts; 161 (47 overs)
Anlo van Deventer 60 (96); Skye Bowden 4/37 (10 overs)		Holly Huddleston 56 (111); Hannah Rowe 3/26 (8 overs)

Central Hinds won by 39 runs
Pukekura Park, New Plymouth
Umpires: Garth Stirrat and Kim Cotton

- Auckland Hearts won the toss and elected to field.

== Statistics ==
=== Most runs ===
Player	Team	Matches	Innings	Runs	Average	HS	100s	50s
Natalie Dodd	Central Hinds	11	11	652	108.66	142	2	2
Kate Ebrahim	Canterbury Magicians	8	8	517	86.16	94	0	6
Anlo van Deventer	Central Hinds	11	10	514	85.66	169*	2	4
Frances Mackay	Canterbury Magicians	6	6	452	90.40	140	3	1
Liz Perry	Wellington Blaze	8	8	390	65.00	114	1	4

Source: ESPN Cricinfo

=== Most wickets ===
Player	Team	Overs	Wickets	Average	BBI	5w
Deanna Doughty	Wellington Blaze	95.1	21	13.42	5/29	1
Rosemary Mair	Central Hinds	75.3	17	15.29	3/30	0
Holly Huddleston	Auckland Hearts	81.3	17	15.88	4/44	0
Amelia Kerr	Wellington Blaze	51.2	14	10.78	4/8	0
Leigh Kasperek	Otago Sparks	46.4	13	9.61	5/10	1

Source: ESPN Cricinfo
