= 2017–18 Hallyburton Johnstone Shield =

Women's cricket competition

- Dates: 25 November 2017 – 28 January 2018
- Administrator: New Zealand Cricket
- Cricket format: 50 over
- Tournament format: Round robin
- Champions: Auckland Hearts (19th title)
- Participants: 6
- Matches: 30
- Most runs: Leigh Kasperek (409)
- Most wickets: Holly Huddleston (21)

The 2017–18 Hallyburton Johnstone Shield was a 50-over women's cricket competition that took place in New Zealand. This was the first time a tournament had been named the Hallyburton Johnstone Shield since 1981–82, which was previously predominantly a first-class competition. It ran from November 2017 to January 2018, with 6 provincial teams taking part. Auckland Hearts topped the group with 8 wins to win the competition.

The tournament ran alongside the 2017–18 New Zealand Women's Twenty20 Competition.

== Competition format ==
Teams played in a double round-robin in a group of six, therefore playing 10 matches overall. Matches were played using a one day format with 50 overs per side. The team that topped the group were named the Champions.

The group worked on a points system with positions being based on the total points. Points were awarded as follows:

Win: 4 points
Tie: 2 points
Loss: 0 points.
Abandoned/No Result: 2 points.
Bonus Point: 1 point awarded for run rate in a match being 1.25x that of opponent.

== Points table ==
| Team | Pld | W | L | T | NR | A | BP | Pts | NRR |
|---|---|---|---|---|---|---|---|---|---|
| Auckland Hearts (C) | 10 | 8 | 1 | 0 | 1 | 0 | 8 | 42 | 1.734 |
| Wellington Blaze | 10 | 7 | 3 | 0 | 0 | 0 | 5 | 33 | 0.853 |
| Canterbury Magicians | 10 | 5 | 4 | 0 | 0 | 1 | 2 | 24 | –0.256 |
| Otago Sparks | 10 | 4 | 5 | 0 | 0 | 1 | 2 | 20 | –0.326 |
| Central Hinds | 10 | 2 | 7 | 0 | 1 | 0 | 0 | 10 | –1.120 |
| Northern Spirit | 10 | 2 | 8 | 0 | 0 | 0 | 0 | 8 | –0.884 |

Source: ESPN Cricinfo

== Statistics ==
=== Most runs ===
| Player | Team | Matches | Innings | Runs | Average | HS | 100s | 50s |
|---|---|---|---|---|---|---|---|---|
| Leigh Kasperek | Otago Sparks | 9 | 9 | 409 | 45.44 | 92 | 0 | 3 |
| Maddy Green | Auckland Hearts | 10 | 10 | 384 | 54.85 | 95 | 0 | 4 |
| Kate Ebrahim | Canterbury Magicians | 9 | 9 | 366 | 61.00 | 83 | 0 | 4 |
| Frances Mackay | Canterbury Magicians | 9 | 9 | 359 | 44.87 | 82 | 0 | 3 |
| Katey Martin | Otago Sparks | 7 | 7 | 322 | 53.66 | 103* | 1 | 2 |

Source: ESPN Cricinfo

=== Most wickets ===
| Player | Team | Overs | Wickets | Average | BBI | 5w |
|---|---|---|---|---|---|---|
| Holly Huddleston | Auckland Hearts | 72.2 | 21 | 11.19 | 4/22 | 0 |
| Deanna Doughty | Wellington Blaze | 94.2 | 20 | 13.35 | 5/26 | 1 |
| Leigh Kasperek | Otago Sparks | 79.2 | 19 | 16.63 | 4/36 | 0 |
| Lucy Doolan | Wellington Blaze | 74.3 | 18 | 16.38 | 4/10 | 0 |
| Frances Mackay | Canterbury Magicians | 75.0 | 15 | 16.66 | 4/22 | 0 |

Source: ESPN Cricinfo
