= 2007–08 State League Twenty20 =

- Dates: 7 December 2007 – 1 February 2008
- Administrator(s): New Zealand Cricket
- Cricket format: Twenty20
- Tournament format(s): Round robin
- Champions: Canterbury Magicians (1st title)
- Participants: 6
- Matches: 15
- Most runs: Sara McGlashan (231)
- Most wickets: Paula Gruber (8); Amanda Cooper (8)

The 2007–08 State League Twenty20 was the inaugural season of the women's Twenty20 cricket competition played in New Zealand. It ran from December 2007 to February 2008, with 6 provincial teams taking part. Canterbury Magicians won the tournament, topping the group with four wins and one abandoned match.

The tournament ran alongside the 2007–08 State League.

== Competition format ==
Teams played in a round-robin in a group of six, playing 5 matches overall. Matches were played using a Twenty20 format. The winners of the group were crowned the Champions.

The group worked on a points system with positions being based on the total points. Points were awarded as follows:

Win: 4 points
Tie: 2 points
Loss: 0 points.
Abandoned/No Result: 2 points.

== Points table ==
Team	Pld	W	L	T	NR	Pts	NRR
Canterbury Magicians (C)	5	4	0	0	1	18	1.764
Central Hinds	5	3	2	0	0	12	0.433
Northern Spirit	5	3	2	0	0	12	–0.257
Wellington Blaze	5	2	3	0	0	8	–0.904
Otago Sparks	5	1	3	0	1	6	–0.597
Auckland Hearts	5	1	4	0	0	4	–0.194

Source: ESPN Cricinfo

== Statistics ==
=== Most runs ===
Player	Team	Matches	Innings	Runs	Average	HS	100s	50s
Sara McGlashan	Central Hinds	5	5	231	115.50	91*	0	2
Aimee Watkins	Central Hinds	5	5	207	51.75	66	0	1
Ingrid Cronin-Knight	Auckland Hearts	5	5	171	57.00	61*	0	2
Megan Wakefield	Wellington Blaze	5	5	159	31.80	54	0	1
Haidee Tiffen	Canterbury Magicians	3	3	129	129.00	76*	0	1

Source: ESPN Cricinfo

=== Most wickets ===
Player	Team	Overs	Wickets	Average	BBI	5w
Paula Gruber	Auckland Hearts	20.0	8	12.12	2/12	0
Amanda Cooper	Wellington Blaze	18.0	8	14.87	4/21	0
Aimee Watkins	Central Hinds	18.0	7	14.57	2/9	0
Rhiana Vincent	Northern Spirit	15.0	6	19.50	2/15	0
Natalie Dodd	Northern Spirit	6.0	5	5.40	3/16	0

Source: ESPN Cricinfo
