= 2019–20 Super Smash (women's cricket) =

- Dates: 13 December 2019 – 19 January 2020
- Administrator(s): New Zealand Cricket
- Cricket format: Twenty20
- Tournament format(s): Round robin and knockout finals
- Champions: Wellington Blaze (6th title)
- Participants: 6
- Matches: 32
- Most runs: Katie Perkins (485)
- Most wickets: Jess Kerr (20)

The 2019–20 Dream11 Super Smash was the thirteenth season of the women's Super Smash Twenty20 cricket competition played in New Zealand. It ran from December 2019 to January 2020, with 6 provincial teams taking part. Wellington Blaze beat Auckland Hearts in the final to win the tournament, their 6th Super Smash title, and third in three seasons.

The tournament ran alongside the 2019–20 Hallyburton Johnstone Shield.

== Competition format ==
Teams played in a double round-robin in a group of six, therefore playing 10 matches overall. Matches were played using a Twenty20 format. The top team in the group advanced straight to the final, whilst the second and third placed teams played off in an elimination final.

The group worked on a points system with positions being based on the total points. Points were awarded as follows:

Win: 4 points
Tie: 2 points
Loss: 0 points.
Abandoned/No Result: 2 points.

== Points table ==
| Team | Pld | W | L | T | NR | A | Pts | NRR |
|---|---|---|---|---|---|---|---|---|
| Wellington Blaze | 10 | 10 | 0 | 0 | 0 | 0 | 40 | 2.715 |
| Auckland Hearts | 10 | 6 | 4 | 0 | 0 | 0 | 24 | 0.470 |
| Otago Sparks | 10 | 6 | 4 | 0 | 0 | 0 | 24 | 0.365 |
| Central Hinds | 10 | 4 | 6 | 0 | 0 | 0 | 16 | –1.133 |
| Northern Spirit | 10 | 2 | 8 | 0 | 0 | 0 | 8 | –0.871 |
| Canterbury Magicians | 10 | 2 | 8 | 0 | 0 | 0 | 8 | –1.390 |

Source: ESPN Cricinfo

Advanced to the Final Advanced to the Elimination Final

== Finals ==
Elimination Final
16 January 2020
Scorecard

| Otago Sparks; 120/7 (20 overs) | v | Auckland Hearts; 121/5 (20 overs) |
| Hayley Jensen 41* (44); Holly Huddleston 2/23 (4 overs) | | Anna Peterson 57 (50); Hannah Darlington 2/19 (4 overs) |

Auckland Hearts won by 5 wickets
Eden Park Outer Oval, Auckland
Umpires: John Dempsey and Kim Cotton

- Otago Sparks won the toss and elected to bat.

Final
19 January 2020
Scorecard

| Wellington Blaze; 81/2 (7 overs) | v | Auckland Hearts; 45/5 (7 overs) |
| Sophie Devine 54 (23); Bella Armstrong 2/23 (2 overs) | | Bella Armstrong 13 (8); Leigh Kasperek 2/4 (1 over) |

Wellington Blaze won by 36 runs
Basin Reserve, Wellington
Umpires: John Dempsey and Kim Cotton

- Auckland Hearts won the toss and elected to field.
- Match reduced to 7 overs per side due to rain.

== Statistics ==
=== Most runs ===
| Player | Team | Matches | Innings | Runs | Average | HS | 100s | 50s |
|---|---|---|---|---|---|---|---|---|
| Katie Perkins | Auckland Hearts | 12 | 12 | 485 | 69.28 | 70* | 0 | 5 |
| Suzie Bates | Otago Sparks | 11 | 11 | 441 | 49.00 | 106* | 1 | 2 |
| Caitlin Gurrey | Northern Spirit | 10 | 10 | 416 | 52.00 | 106* | 1 | 3 |
| Sophie Devine | Wellington Blaze | 10 | 9 | 369 | 52.71 | 112 | 1 | 2 |
| Rachel Priest | Wellington Blaze | 11 | 9 | 319 | 39.87 | 76 | 0 | 2 |

Source: ESPN Cricinfo

=== Most wickets ===
| Player | Team | Overs | Wickets | Average | BBI | 5w |
|---|---|---|---|---|---|---|
| Jess Kerr | Wellington Blaze | 40.0 | 20 | 10.30 | 4/13 | 0 |
| Amelia Kerr | Wellington Blaze | 42.0 | 18 | 12.61 | 4/15 | 0 |
| Deanna Doughty | Wellington Blaze | 37.1 | 17 | 12.76 | 3/16 | 0 |
| Leigh Kasperek | Wellington Blaze | 38.2 | 15 | 14.13 | 2/4 | 0 |
| Anna Peterson | Auckland Hearts | 44.0 | 15 | 18.60 | 3/32 | 0 |

Source: ESPN Cricinfo
