= 2011–12 Action Cricket Twenty20 =

- Dates: 2 December 2011 – 15 January 2012
- Administrator(s): New Zealand Cricket
- Cricket format: Twenty20
- Tournament format(s): Round robin and final
- Champions: Canterbury Magicians (3rd title)
- Participants: 6
- Matches: 31
- Most runs: Sarah Taylor (306)
- Most wickets: Paula Gruber (11); Rachel Candy (11)

The 2011–12 Action Cricket Twenty20 was the fifth season of the women's Twenty20 cricket competition played in New Zealand. It ran from December 2011 to January 2012, with 6 provincial teams taking part. Canterbury Magicians beat Auckland Hearts in the final to win the tournament, their third Twenty20 title and second in two seasons.

The tournament ran alongside the 2011–12 Action Cricket Cup.

== Competition format ==
Teams played in a double round-robin in a group of six, playing 10 matches overall. Matches were played using a Twenty20 format. The top two in the group advanced to the final.

The group worked on a points system with positions being based on the total points. Points were awarded as follows:

Win: 4 points
Tie: 2 points
Loss: 0 points.
Abandoned/No Result: 2 points.

== Points table ==
Team	Pld	W	L	T	NR	Pts	NRR
Canterbury Magicians	10	9	0	0	1	38	0.932
Auckland Hearts	10	6	1	0	3	30	0.903
Wellington Blaze	10	6	3	0	1	26	0.000
Northern Spirit	10	2	6	0	2	12	–0.254
Central Hinds	10	2	7	0	1	10	–0.513
Otago Sparks	10	1	9	0	0	4	–0.797

Source: ESPN Cricinfo

Advanced to the Final

== Final ==
15 January 2012
Scorecard

Canterbury Magicians; 113/8 (20 overs)	v	Auckland Hearts; 84 (17.4 overs)
Janet Brehaut 32 (22); Georgia Guy 2/16 (4 overs)		Samantha Curtis 29 (34); Amy Satterthwaite 4/14 (3 overs)

Canterbury Magicians won by 29 runs
Hagley Oval, Christchurch
Umpires: Kathy Cross and Peter Gasston

- Auckland Hearts won the toss and elected to field.

== Statistics ==
=== Most runs ===
Player	Team	Matches	Innings	Runs	Average	HS	100s	50s
Sarah Taylor	Wellington Blaze	10	9	306	61.20	63*	0	2
Stafanie Taylor	Auckland Hearts	9	8	291	48.50	86*	0	3
Frances Mackay	Canterbury Magicians	10	10	288	41.14	62*	0	2
Rachel Priest	Central Hinds	10	9	283	35.37	106*	1	0
Katey Martin	Otago Sparks	10	10	276	27.60	45	0	0

Source: ESPN Cricinfo

=== Most wickets ===
Player	Team	Overs	Wickets	Average	BBI	5w
Paula Gruber	Auckland Hearts	32.0	11	15.00	3/9	0
Rachel Candy	Canterbury Magicians	37.0	11	16.36	2/10	0
Kelly Anderson	Canterbury Magicians	32.0	10	16.00	3/20	0
Eimear Richardson	Central Hinds	25.0	9	15.33	3/21	0
Kate Ebrahim	Central Hinds	33.1	9	16.55	3/8	0

Source: ESPN Cricinfo
