= Super Smash (women's cricket) =

Professional twenty20 cricket league in New Zealand

Women's Super Smash
- Countries: New Zealand
- Administrator: New Zealand Cricket
- Format: Twenty20
- First edition: 2007–08
- Latest edition: 2025–26
- Next edition: 2026–27
- Tournament format: Double round-robin, preliminary final and final
- Number of teams: 6
- Current champion: Wellington Blaze (10th title)
- Most successful: Wellington Blaze (10 titles)
- TV: TVNZ (New Zealand); ESPN+ (US)
- Website: Super Smash

The Super Smash is a women's Twenty20 competition organised by New Zealand Cricket.

The competition began in 2007–08 and features six teams, who play each other twice in a double round-robin format. The winner of the group advances to the final, and the second and third placed teams play in an elimination final. The competition runs alongside the 50-over Hallyburton Johnstone Shield.

The current champions are Wellington Blaze, who won the 2025–26 competition and are the most successful team in the history of the competition with eight title wins.

== History ==
The tournament began in 2007–08, as the State League Twenty20. Teams played each other once, with the winner of the group being crowned champions: Canterbury Magicians were the inaugural winners. The following season had a final, in which Wellington Blaze beat defending champions Canterbury.

The following season kept the same format, but was known as the New Zealand Cricket Women's Twenty20, with the Central Hinds winning their first title. For the following two seasons, the tournament was known as the Action Cricket Twenty20, before becoming simply the New Zealand Women's Twenty20 Competition until the 2017–18 season. In this period, Wellington and Canterbury won three titles apiece, and one each for Auckland Hearts and Otago Sparks.

In 2018–19, the tournament was renamed the Burger King Women's Super Smash, in line with the men's competition. In 2019–20, Dream11 became the sponsors, and an elimination final, a match between the second and third placed teams to advance to the final, was introduced. Wellington Blaze won three titles in a row between 2017–18 and 2019–20, but Canterbury beat them in the final in 2020–21. Wellington regained their title in 2021–22, going unbeaten in the group stage before beating Otago in the final. Canterbury won their sixth title in 2022–23, beating Wellington in the final after finishing third in the group stage. Wellington Blaze claimed their eighth title after defeating Central Hinds in the 2023–24 final.

== Tournament names ==
Period	Name
2007–08 to 2008–09	State League Twenty20
2009–10	New Zealand Cricket Women's Twenty20
2010–11 to 2011–12	Action Cricket Twenty20
2012–13 to 2017–18	New Zealand Women's Twenty20 Competition
2018–19 to present	Super Smash

== Teams ==
Location of teams in Super Smash

Team	Wins	Runners-up
Auckland Hearts	1	5
Canterbury Magicians	6	5
Central Hinds	1	3
Northern Brave	0	0
Otago Sparks	1	3
Wellington Blaze	10	3

== Roll of Honour ==
Season	Winner	Runner-up	Leading run-scorer	Leading wicket-taker	Ref
2007–08	Canterbury Magicians	Central Hinds	Sara McGlashan (Hinds) 231	Paula Gruber (Hearts); Amanda Cooper (Blaze) 8	
2008–09	Wellington Blaze	Canterbury Magicians	Lucy Doolan (Blaze) 212	Amanda Cooper (Blaze) 9	
2009–10	Central Hinds	Auckland Hearts	Nicola Browne (Hinds) 150	Sarah Tsukigawa (Sparks) 11	
2010–11	Canterbury Magicians	Wellington Blaze	Suzie Bates (Sparks) 413	Natasha Miles (Sparks); Lucy Doolan (Blaze) 14	
2011–12	Canterbury Magicians	Auckland Hearts	Sarah Taylor (Blaze) 306	Paula Gruber (Hearts); Rachel Candy (Magicians) 11	
2012–13	Wellington Blaze	Canterbury Magicians	Sophie Devine (Blaze) 191	Brooke Kirkbride (Hinds) 9	
2013–14	Auckland Hearts	Canterbury Magicians	Sara McGlashan (Hearts) 243	Paula Gruber (Hearts); Megan Tremaine (Hearts) 7	
2014–15	Wellington Blaze	Otago Sparks	Suzie Bates (Sparks) 237	Amelia Kerr (Blaze); Eimear Richardson (Blaze) 10	
2015–16	Canterbury Magicians	Central Hinds	Frances Mackay (Magicians) 190	5 bowlers (Note: Deanna Doughty (Blaze), Frances Mackay (Magicians), Anna Peterson (Hearts), Amy Satterthwaite (Magicians) and Lea Tahuhu (Magicians) all took 7 wickets.)	
2016–17	Otago Sparks	Canterbury Magicians	Frances Mackay (Magicians) 223	Leigh Kasperek (Sparks) 8	
2017–18	Wellington Blaze	Auckland Hearts	Bernadine Bezuidenhout (Hinds) 280	Lucy Doolan (Blaze); Anna Peterson (Hearts) 16	
2018–19	Wellington Blaze	Canterbury Magicians	Frances Mackay (Magicians) 367	Amelia Kerr (Blaze) 19	
2019–20	Wellington Blaze	Auckland Hearts	Katie Perkins (Hearts) 485	Jess Kerr (Blaze) 20	
2020–21	Canterbury Magicians	Wellington Blaze	Sophie Devine (Blaze) 434	Frances Mackay (Magicians) 20	
2021–22	Wellington Blaze	Otago Sparks	Suzie Bates (Sparks) 504	Leigh Kasperek (Blaze) 20	
2022–23	Canterbury Magicians	Wellington Blaze	Kate Anderson (Magicians) 536	Gabby Sullivan (Magicians) 21	
2023–24	Wellington Blaze	Central Hinds	Amelia Kerr (Blaze) 437	Amelia Kerr (Blaze) 20	
2024–25	Wellington Blaze	Otago Sparks	Amelia Kerr (Blaze) 441	Eden Carson (Sparks) 18	
2025–26	Wellington Blaze	Auckland Hearts	Brooke Halliday (Hearts) 306	Molly Penfold (Hearts) 17	

== See also ==
- Super Smash (men's cricket)
- Plunket Shield
- Hallyburton Johnstone Shield
- The Ford Trophy
- Cricket in New Zealand
