= 2018–19 Super Smash (women's cricket) =

- Dates: 25 October 2018 – 20 January 2019
- Administrator(s): New Zealand Cricket
- Cricket format: Twenty20
- Tournament format(s): Round robin and final
- Champions: Wellington Blaze (5th title)
- Participants: 6
- Matches: 31
- Most runs: Frances Mackay (367)
- Most wickets: Amelia Kerr (19)

The 2018–19 Burger King Super Smash was the twelfth season of the women's Super Smash Twenty20 cricket competition played in New Zealand. It ran from October 2018 to January 2019, with 6 provincial teams taking part. Wellington Blaze beat Canterbury Magicians in the final to win the tournament, their 5th Super Smash title, and second in two seasons.

The tournament ran alongside the 2018–19 Hallyburton Johnstone Shield.

== Competition format ==
Teams played in a double round-robin in a group of six, therefore playing 10 matches overall. Matches were played using a Twenty20 format. The top two in the group advanced to the final.

The group worked on a points system with positions being based on the total points. Points were awarded as follows:

Win: 4 points
Loss: 0 points.
Abandoned/No Result: 2 points.

== Points table ==
| Team | Pld | W | L | NR | A | Pts | NRR |
|---|---|---|---|---|---|---|---|
| Wellington Blaze | 10 | 6 | 2 | 0 | 2 | 28 | 0.408 |
| Canterbury Magicians | 10 | 6 | 3 | 0 | 1 | 26 | 1.042 |
| Auckland Hearts | 10 | 5 | 3 | 0 | 2 | 24 | 0.481 |
| Otago Sparks | 10 | 4 | 4 | 0 | 2 | 20 | 0.298 |
| Northern Spirit | 10 | 4 | 5 | 0 | 1 | 18 | –0.666 |
| Central Hinds | 10 | 0 | 8 | 0 | 2 | 4 | –1.489 |

Source: New Zealand Cricket

Advanced to the Final

== Final ==
20 January 2019
Scorecard

| Canterbury Magicians; 130/3 (20 overs) | v | Wellington Blaze; 131/6 (20 overs) |
| Erin Bermingham 61* (49); Jess Kerr 1/25 (4 overs) | | Rebecca Burns 41 (44); Kate Ebrahim 1/17 (3 overs) |

Wellington Blaze won by 4 wickets
Eden Park Outer Oval, Auckland
Umpires: John Dempsey and Kim Cotton

- Canterbury Magicians won the toss and elected to bat.

== Statistics ==
=== Most runs ===
| Player | Team | Matches | Innings | Runs | Average | HS | 100s | 50s |
|---|---|---|---|---|---|---|---|---|
| Frances Mackay | Canterbury Magicians | 10 | 9 | 367 | 73.40 | 97 | 0 | 3 |
| Caitlin Gurrey | Northern Spirit | 7 | 7 | 298 | 42.57 | 79 | 0 | 4 |
| Erin Bermingham | Canterbury Magicians | 10 | 9 | 273 | 54.60 | 65* | 0 | 2 |
| Bernadine Bezuidenhout | Northern Spirit | 8 | 8 | 228 | 32.57 | 77* | 0 | 1 |
| Amelia Kerr | Wellington Blaze | 9 | 9 | 209 | 34.83 | 52* | 0 | 1 |

Source: ESPN Cricinfo

=== Most wickets ===
| Player | Team | Overs | Wickets | Average | BBI | 5w |
|---|---|---|---|---|---|---|
| Amelia Kerr | Wellington Blaze | 36.0 | 19 | 9.47 | 4/4 | 0 |
| Deanna Doughty | Wellington Blaze | 36.0 | 13 | 13.53 | 4/13 | 0 |
| Erin Bermingham | Canterbury Magicians | 36.0 | 11 | 17.81 | 3/18 | 0 |
| Gabby Sullivan | Canterbury Magicians | 21.0 | 9 | 16.44 | 3/30 | 0 |
| Frances Mackay | Canterbury Magicians | 29.0 | 9 | 19.55 | 3/25 | 0 |

Source: ESPN Cricinfo
