= 2017–18 New Zealand Women's Twenty20 Competition =

- Dates: 24 November 2017 – 11 February 2018
- Administrator: New Zealand Cricket
- Cricket format: Twenty20
- Tournament format: Round robin
- Champions: Wellington Blaze (4th title)
- Participants: 6
- Matches: 30
- Most runs: Bernadine Bezuidenhout (280)
- Most wickets: Lucy Doolan (16); Anna Peterson (16)

The 2017–18 New Zealand Women's Twenty20 Competition was the eleventh season of the women's Twenty20 cricket competition played in New Zealand. It ran from November 2017 to February 2018, with 6 provincial teams taking part. Wellington Blaze topped the group with 7 wins to win their 4th Twenty20 title.

The tournament ran alongside the 2017–18 Hallyburton Johnstone Shield.

== Competition format ==
Teams played in a double round-robin in a group of six, therefore playing 10 matches overall. Matches were played using a Twenty20 format. The team that topped the group were named the Champions.

The group worked on a points system with positions being based on the total points. Points were awarded as follows:

Win: 4 points
Tie: 2 points
Loss: 0 points.
Abandoned/No Result: 2 points.

== Points table ==
Team	Pld	W	L	T	NR	Pts	NRR
Wellington Blaze (C)	10	7	2	0	1	30	1.324
Auckland Hearts	10	6	3	0	1	26	0.855
Canterbury Magicians	10	5	3	0	2	24	0.525
Central Hinds	10	3	6	0	1	14	–0.948
Northern Spirit	10	3	6	0	1	14	–1.341
Otago Sparks	10	2	6	0	2	12	–0.434

Source: ESPN Cricinfo

== Statistics ==
=== Most runs ===
Player	Team	Matches	Innings	Runs	Average	HS	100s	50s
Bernadine Bezuidenhout	Northern Spirit	9	9	280	35.00	65	0	2
Natalie Dodd	Northern Spirit	9	9	257	36.71	55*	0	1
Maddy Green	Auckland Hearts	9	9	251	35.85	56*	0	2
Jess Watkin	Central Hinds	9	9	248	27.55	66	0	2
Amy Satterthwaite	Canterbury Magicians	7	7	218	36.33	63*	0	2

Source: ESPN Cricinfo

=== Most wickets ===
Player	Team	Overs	Wickets	Average	BBI	5w
Lucy Doolan	Wellington Blaze	30.2	16	10.00	4/10	0
Anna Peterson	Auckland Hearts	33.1	16	11.00	4/17	0
Bella Armstrong	Auckland Hearts	30.0	14	10.85	3/20	0
Deanna Doughty	Wellington Blaze	33.0	13	12.92	3/13	0
Holly Huddleston	Auckland Hearts	35.1	12	14.25	3/15	0

Source: ESPN Cricinfo
