= 2014–15 New Zealand Women's Twenty20 Competition =

- Dates: 28 November 2014 – 24 January 2015
- Administrator: New Zealand Cricket
- Cricket format: Twenty20
- Tournament format(s): Round robin and final
- Champions: Wellington Blaze (3rd title)
- Participants: 6
- Matches: 16
- Most runs: Suzie Bates (237)
- Most wickets: Amelia Kerr (10); Eimear Richardson (10)

The 2014–15 New Zealand Women's Twenty20 Competition was the eighth season of the women's Twenty20 cricket competition played in New Zealand. It ran from November 2014 to January 2015, with 6 provincial teams taking part. Wellington Blaze beat Otago Sparks in the final to win the tournament, their third Twenty20 title.

The tournament ran alongside the 2014–15 New Zealand Women's One-Day Competition.

== Competition format ==
Teams played in a round-robin in a group of six, each playing 5 group matches overall. Matches were played using a Twenty20 format. The top two teams in the group advanced to the final.

The group worked on a points system with positions being based on the total points. Points were awarded as follows:

Win: 4 points
Tie: 2 points
Loss: 0 points.
Abandoned/No Result: 2 points.

== Points table ==
Team	Pld	W	L	T	NR	Pts	NRR
Otago Sparks	5	4	1	0	0	16	0.319
Wellington Blaze	5	3	2	0	0	12	0.892
Auckland Hearts	5	3	2	0	0	12	0.352
Canterbury Magicians	5	2	3	0	0	8	0.438
Northern Spirit	5	2	3	0	0	8	–0.730
Central Hinds	5	1	4	0	0	4	–1.543

Source: ESPN Cricinfo

Advanced to the Final

== Final ==
24 January 2015
Scorecard

Otago Sparks; 97 (19.5 overs)	v	Wellington Blaze; 98/0 (15.2 overs)
Suzie Bates 34 (37); Eimear Richardson 3/16 (4 overs)		Erin Burns 59* (50)

Wellington Blaze won by 10 wickets
University Oval, Dunedin
Umpires: Chris Brown and Raoul Allen

- Otago Sparks won the toss and elected to bat.

== Statistics ==
=== Most runs ===
Player	Team	Matches	Innings	Runs	Average	HS	100s	50s
Suzie Bates	Otago Sparks	6	6	237	47.40	72	0	2
Katey Martin	Otago Sparks	6	6	227	45.40	65*	0	2
Liz Perry	Wellington Blaze	6	5	213	213.00	55*	0	1
Amy Satterthwaite	Canterbury Magicians	5	5	202	67.33	59	0	1
Nicola Browne	Northern Spirit	4	4	187	62.33	56*	0	1

Source: ESPN Cricinfo

=== Most wickets ===
Player	Team	Overs	Wickets	Average	BBI	5w
Amelia Kerr	Wellington Blaze	23.0	10	11.60	3/19	0
Eimear Richardson	Wellington Blaze	21.4	10	12.00	4/16	0
Allex Evans	Wellington Blaze	19.0	8	10.87	4/13	0
Morna Nielsen	Otago Sparks	23.0	7	13.14	3/20	0
Georgia Guy	Auckland Hearts	12.0	5	12.00	2/17	0

Source: ESPN Cricinfo
