= 2007–08 State League =

- Dates: 8 December 2007 – 9 February 2008
- Administrator: New Zealand Cricket
- Cricket format: 50 over
- Tournament format(s): Round robin and final
- Champions: Canterbury Magicians (34th title)
- Participants: 6
- Matches: 31
- Most runs: Megan Wakefield (411)
- Most wickets: Sophie Devine (18)

The 2007–08 State League was a 50-over women's cricket competition that took place in New Zealand. It ran from December 2007 to February 2008, with 6 provincial teams taking part. Canterbury Magicians beat Central Hinds in the final to win the competition, their second State League title in two seasons.

The tournament ran alongside the 2007–08 State League Twenty20.

== Competition format ==
Teams played in a double round-robin in a group of six, therefore playing 10 matches overall. Matches were played using a one day format with 50 overs per side. The top two in the group advanced to the final.

The group worked on a points system with positions being based on the total points. Points were awarded as follows:

Win: 4 points
Tie: 2 points
Loss: 0 points.
Abandoned/No Result: 2 points.
Bonus Point: 1 point awarded for run rate in a match being 1.25x that of opponent.

== Points table ==
Team	Pld	W	L	T	NR	A	BP	Pts	NRR
Central Hinds	10	7	2	0	0	1	5	35	1.062
Canterbury Magicians	10	7	2	0	1	0	5	35	0.922
Auckland Hearts	10	6	3	0	0	1	2	28	0.033
Otago Sparks	10	4	4	0	0	2	3	23	–0.245
Wellington Blaze	10	2	8	0	0	0	0	8	–0.883
Northern Spirit	10	1	8	0	1	0	0	6	–0.890

Source: CricketArchive

Advanced to the Final

== Final ==
9 February 2008
Scorecard

Central Hinds; 85/8 (50 overs)	v	Canterbury Magicians; 86/3 (19.2 overs)
Rachel Candy 16* (23); Sarah Burke 3/12 (10 overs)		Michelle Mitchell 32 (24); Kate Ebrahim 1/15 (4 overs)

Canterbury Magicians won by 7 wickets
McLean Park, Napier
Umpires: Barry Frost and Dave Quested

- Central Hinds won the toss and chose to bat.

== Statistics ==
=== Most runs ===
Player	Team	Matches	Innings	Runs	Average	HS	100s	50s
Megan Wakefield	Wellington Blaze	10	10	411	45.66	85	0	4
Ingrid Cronin-Knight	Auckland Hearts	9	9	372	62.00	83	0	3
Sara McGlashan	Central Hinds	10	10	371	53.00	78*	0	3
Aimee Watkins	Central Hinds	10	10	368	52.57	94	0	3
Nicola Browne	Northern Spirit	10	9	359	51.28	84*	0	3

Source: ESPN Cricinfo

=== Most wickets ===
Player	Team	Overs	Wickets	Average	BBI	5w
Sophie Devine	Canterbury Magicians	80.0	18	13.22	5/33	1
Rachel Candy	Central Hinds	82.0	17	15.64	5/24	1
Aimee Watkins	Central Hinds	77.5	17	15.70	4/33	0
Prashilla Mistry	Auckland Hearts	80.2	16	17.56	5/23	1
Amanda Cooper	Wellington Blaze	79.2	16	22.81	4/42	0

Source: ESPN Cricinfo
