= 2013–14 New Zealand Women's Twenty20 Competition =

Women's Twenty20 competition

- Dates: 6 December 2013 – 26 January 2014
- Administrator: New Zealand Cricket
- Cricket format: Twenty20
- Tournament format(s): Round robin and final
- Champions: Auckland Hearts (1st title)
- Participants: 6
- Matches: 16
- Most runs: Sara McGlashan (243)
- Most wickets: Paula Gruber (7); Megan Tremaine (7)

The 2013–14 New Zealand Women's Twenty20 Competition was the seventh season of the women's Twenty20 cricket competition played in New Zealand. It ran from December 2013 to January 2014, with 6 provincial teams taking part. Auckland Hearts beat Canterbury Magicians in the final to win the tournament, their first Twenty20 title.

The tournament ran alongside the 2013–14 New Zealand Women's One-Day Competition.

== Competition format ==
Teams played in a round-robin in a group of six, playing 5 matches overall. Matches were played using a Twenty20 format. The top two in the group advanced to the final.

The group worked on a points system with positions being based on the total points. Points were awarded as follows:

Win: 4 points
Tie: 2 points
Loss: 0 points.
Abandoned/No Result: 2 points.

== Points table ==
Team	Pld	W	L	T	NR	Pts	NRR
Auckland Hearts	5	4	0	0	1	18	2.773
Canterbury Magicians	5	2	1	0	2	12	0.186
Wellington Blaze	5	2	2	0	1	10	1.263
Otago Sparks	5	1	1	0	3	10	–1.292
Central Hinds	5	1	3	0	1	6	–1.019
Northern Spirit	5	0	3	0	2	4	–2.592

Source: ESPN Cricinfo

Advanced to the Final

== Final ==
26 January 2014
Scorecard

Canterbury Magicians; 129/7 (20 overs)	v	Auckland Hearts; 133/3 (16.1 overs)
Amy Satterthwaite 40 (29); Paula Gruber 3/24 (4 overs)		Sara McGlashan 62* (41); Frances Mackay 1/24 (4 overs)

Auckland Hearts won by 7 wickets
Melville Park, Auckland
Umpires: Ashley Mehrotra and Kathy Cross

- Auckland Hearts won the toss and elected to field.

== Statistics ==
=== Most runs ===
Player	Team	Matches	Innings	Runs	Average	HS	100s	50s
Sara McGlashan	Auckland Hearts	5	5	243	243.00	131*	1	1
Samantha Curtis	Auckland Hearts	5	5	163	40.75	69	0	1
Sophie Devine	Wellington Blaze	4	4	156	52.00	58*	0	1
Kate Ebrahim	Central Hinds	4	4	153	51.00	62	0	2
Amy Satterthwaite	Canterbury Magicians	4	4	138	34.50	44	0	0

Source: ESPN Cricinfo

=== Most wickets ===
Player	Team	Overs	Wickets	Average	BBI	5w
Paula Gruber	Auckland Hearts	17.0	7	11.00	3/24	0
Megan Tremaine	Auckland Hearts	17.0	7	13.57	3/16	0
Suzie Bates	Otago Sparks	8.0	6	7.16	4/21	0
Georgia Guy	Auckland Hearts	14.0	5	17.60	3/17	0
Erin Bermingham	Canterbury Magicians	16.0	4	17.00	2/16	0

Source: ESPN Cricinfo
