= 2008–09 State League Twenty20 =

- Dates: 5 December 2008 – 25 January 2009
- Administrator(s): New Zealand Cricket
- Cricket format: Twenty20
- Tournament format(s): Round robin and final
- Champions: Wellington Blaze (1st title)
- Participants: 6
- Matches: 16
- Most runs: Lucy Doolan (212)
- Most wickets: Amanda Cooper (9)

The 2008–09 State League Twenty20 was the second season of the women's Twenty20 cricket competition played in New Zealand. It ran from December 2008 to January 2009, with 6 provincial teams taking part. Wellington Blaze beat Canterbury Magicians in the final to win the tournament, their first Twenty20 title.

The tournament ran alongside the 2008–09 State League.

== Competition format ==
Teams played in a round-robin in a group of six, playing 5 matches overall. Matches were played using a Twenty20 format. The top two in the group advanced to the final.

The group worked on a points system with positions being based on the total points. Points were awarded as follows:

Win: 4 points
Tie: 2 points
Loss: 0 points.
Abandoned/No Result: 2 points.

== Points table ==
Team	Pld	W	L	T	NR	Pts	NRR
Canterbury Magicians	5	4	1	0	0	16	0.926
Wellington Blaze	5	3	1	0	1	14	1.888
Central Hinds	5	2	2	0	1	10	0.276
Auckland Hearts	5	2	3	0	0	8	–0.642
Northern Spirit	5	1	3	0	1	6	–1.028
Otago Sparks	5	1	3	0	1	6	–1.593

Source: ESPN Cricinfo

Advanced to the Final

== Final ==
25 January 2009
Scorecard

Canterbury Magicians; 123 (18.3 overs)	v	Wellington Blaze; 124/6 (19.3 overs)
Maria Fahey 37 (25); Amanda Cooper 3/20 (4 overs)		Lucy Doolan 63 (51); Frances Mackay 2/32 (4 overs)

Wellington Blaze won 4 wickets
Basin Reserve, Wellington
Umpires: Dave Quested and Evan Gray

- Canterbury Magicians won the toss and elected to bat.

== Statistics ==
=== Most runs ===
Player	Team	Matches	Innings	Runs	Average	HS	100s	50s
Lucy Doolan	Wellington Blaze	5	5	212	53.00	63	0	2
Kate Pulford	Northern Spirit	4	4	193	64.33	83*	0	2
Maria Fahey	Canterbury Magicians	5	5	167	41.75	52	0	1
Sophie Devine	Wellington Blaze	5	5	149	29.80	51	0	2
Suzie Bates	Otago Sparks	4	4	134	44.66	70*	0	1

Source: ESPN Cricinfo

=== Most wickets ===
Player	Team	Overs	Wickets	Average	BBI	5w
Amanda Cooper	Wellington Blaze	14.4	9	10.11	3/0	0
Lucy Doolan	Wellington Blaze	18.0	8	12.87	3/12	0
Sarah Burke	Canterbury Magicians	23.0	8	14.37	3/23	0
Amy Satterthwaite	Canterbury Magicians	20.0	7	12.42	2/14	0
Kelly Winkley	Central Hinds	9.0	6	8.16	4/10	0

Source: ESPN Cricinfo
