= 2014–15 New Zealand Women's One-Day Competition =

- Dates: 29 November 2014 – 25 January 2015
- Administrator: New Zealand Cricket
- Cricket format: 50 over
- Tournament format(s): Round robin and final
- Champions: Auckland Hearts (17th title)
- Participants: 6
- Matches: 31
- Most runs: Amy Satterthwaite (892)
- Most wickets: Frances Mackay (20)

The 2014–15 New Zealand Women's One-Day Competition was a 50-over women's cricket competition that took place in New Zealand. It ran from November 2014 to January 2015, with 6 provincial teams taking part. Auckland Hearts beat Canterbury Magicians in the final to win the competition.

The tournament ran alongside the 2014–15 New Zealand Women's Twenty20 Competition.

== Competition format ==
Teams played in a double round-robin in a group of six, therefore playing 10 matches overall. Matches were played using a one day format with 50 overs per side. The top two in the group advanced to the final.

The group worked on a points system with positions being based on the total points. Points were awarded as follows:

Win: 4 points
Tie: 2 points
Loss: 0 points.
Abandoned/No Result: 2 points.
Bonus Point: 1 point awarded for run rate in a match being 1.25x that of opponent.

== Points table ==
Team	Pld	W	L	T	NR	A	BP	Pts	NRR
Canterbury Magicians	10	8	2	0	0	0	6	38	0.914
Auckland Hearts	10	6	3	0	0	1	5	31	0.737
Central Hinds	10	4	5	0	0	1	2	20	–0.514
Wellington Blaze	10	4	5	0	0	1	1	19	0.069
Otago Sparks	10	4	6	0	0	0	1	17	–0.306
Northern Spirit	10	2	7	0	0	1	0	10	–1.007

Source: ESPN Cricinfo

Advanced to the Final

== Final ==
25 January 2015
Scorecard

Canterbury Magicians; 261/3 (50 overs)	v	Auckland Hearts; 262/4 (49.2 overs)
Amy Satterthwaite 122* (121); Rosalind McNeill 1/29 (8 overs)		Samantha Curtis 77 (119); Rachel Candy 2/63 (9.2 overs)

Auckland Hearts won by 6 wickets
MainPower Oval, Rangiora
Umpires: Ashley Mehrotra and Kathy Cross

- Auckland Hearts won the toss and elected to field.

== Statistics ==
=== Most runs ===
Player	Team	Matches	Innings	Runs	Average	HS	100s	50s
Amy Satterthwaite	Canterbury Magicians	11	11	892	148.66	136	4	4
Suzie Bates	Otago Sparks	10	10	668	83.50	150*	2	5
Frances Mackay	Canterbury Magicians	11	11	572	52.00	106	1	3
Kate Ebrahim	Central Hinds	9	9	484	96.80	115*	1	4
Sara McGlashan	Auckland Hearts	9	9	476	68.00	125	2	1

Source: ESPN Cricinfo

=== Most wickets ===
Player	Team	Overs	Wickets	Average	BBI	5w
Frances Mackay	Canterbury Magicians	94.4	20	21.15	3/16	0
Amelia Kerr	Wellington Blaze	81.3	17	21.41	4/28	0
Michelle Bunkall	Central Hinds	72.3	16	21.06	4/56	0
Lea Tahuhu	Canterbury Magicians	90.4	15	20.00	4/17	0
Leigh Kasperek	Otago Sparks	87.3	15	26.13	4/24	0

Source: ESPN Cricinfo
