= 2008–09 State League =

50-over women's cricket competition in New Zealand

- Dates: 6 December 2008 – 24 January 2009
- Administrator: New Zealand Cricket
- Cricket format: 50 over
- Tournament format(s): Round robin and final
- Champions: Canterbury Magicians (35th title)
- Participants: 6
- Matches: 31
- Most runs: Nicola Browne (449)
- Most wickets: Emma Campbell (24)

The 2008–09 State League was a 50-over women's cricket competition that took place in New Zealand. It ran from December 2008 to January 2009, with 6 provincial teams taking part. Canterbury Magicians beat Wellington Blaze in the final to win the competition, their third State League title in three seasons.

The tournament ran alongside the 2008–09 State League Twenty20.

== Competition format ==
Teams played in a double round-robin in a group of six, therefore playing 10 matches overall. Matches were played using a one day format with 50 overs per side. The top two in the group advanced to the final.

The group worked on a points system with positions being based on the total points. Points were awarded as follows:

Win: 4 points
Tie: 2 points
Loss: 0 points.
Abandoned/No Result: 2 points.
Bonus Point: 1 point awarded for run rate in a match being 1.25x that of opponent.

== Points table ==
Team	Pld	W	L	T	NR	A	BP	Pts	NRR
Wellington Blaze	10	8	2	0	0	0	4	36	0.653
Canterbury Magicians	10	5	4	0	0	1	3	25	0.416
Central Hinds	10	5	4	0	1	0	1	23	–0.032
Otago Sparks	10	5	4	0	0	1	1	23	–0.222
Northern Spirit	10	3	7	0	0	0	0	12	–0.230
Auckland Hearts	10	2	7	0	1	0	0	10	–0.573

Source: ESPN Cricinfo

Advanced to the Final

== Final ==
24 January 2009
Scorecard

Wellington Blaze; 197/8 (50 overs)	v	Canterbury Magicians; 198/8 (50 overs)
Megan Wakefield 41 (58); Amy Satterthwaite 3/32 (9 overs)		Beth McNeill 31 (32); Sophie Devine 3/29 (10 overs)

Canterbury Magicians won by 2 wickets
Basin Reserve, Wellington
Umpires: Dave Quested and Evan Gray

- Wellington Blaze won the toss and chose to bat.

== Statistics ==
=== Most runs ===
Player	Team	Matches	Innings	Runs	Average	HS	100s	50s
Nicola Browne	Northern Spirit	10	10	449	64.14	101	1	3
Megan Wakefield	Wellington Blaze	11	11	403	36.63	120	1	1
Sarah Tsukigawa	Otago Sparks	9	9	341	37.88	74	0	5
Sara McGlashan	Central Hinds	10	9	336	37.33	82	0	4
Kate Pulford	Northern Spirit	10	10	333	33.30	96	0	3

Source: ESPN Cricinfo

=== Most wickets ===
Player	Team	Overs	Wickets	Average	BBI	5w
Emma Campbell	Otago Sparks	67.5	24	9.50	4/31	0
Lucy Doolan	Wellington Blaze	92.2	20	15.20	3/20	0
Anna Dodd	Wellington Blaze	88.4	19	15.73	3/12	0
Beth McNeill	Canterbury Magicians	79.2	18	14.88	4/34	0
Kate Pulford	Northern Spirit	93.1	17	17.52	3/21	0

Source: ESPN Cricinfo
