= 2026–27 Hallyburton Johnstone Shield =

Domestic cricket competition

- Dates: 14 November 2026 – 20 February 2027
- Administrator: New Zealand Cricket
- Cricket format: 50 over
- Tournament format(s): Round robin and final
- Participants: 6
- Matches: 31

The 2026–27 Hallyburton Johnstone Shield is the 10th season of Hallyburton Johnstone Shield, which is a 50-over women's cricket competition in New Zealand. The tournament runs from 14 November 2026 to 20 February 2027.

Northern Districts are the defending champions.

== Competition format ==
Teams play in a double round-robin in a group of six, therefore playing 10 matches overall. Matches are played using a one day format with 50 overs per side. The top two in the group advance to the final.

The group work on a points system with positions being based on the total points. Points are awarded as follows:

Win: 4 points
Tie: 2 points
Loss: 0 points.
Abandoned/No Result: 2 points.
Bonus Point: 1 point awarded for run rate in a match being 1.25x that of opponent.

== Teams and standing ==
=== Points table ===
| Pos | Team | Pld | W | L | BP | Pts | NRR | Qualification |
|---|---|---|---|---|---|---|---|---|
| 1 | Auckland Hearts | 0 | 0 | 0 | 0 | 0 | — | Advanced to the final |
| 2 | Central Hinds | 0 | 0 | 0 | 0 | 0 | — | Advanced to the final |
| 3 | Canterbury Magicians | 0 | 0 | 0 | 0 | 0 | — | |
| 4 | Northern Districts | 0 | 0 | 0 | 0 | 0 | — | |
| 5 | Otago Sparks | 0 | 0 | 0 | 0 | 0 | — | |
| 6 | Wellington Blaze | 0 | 0 | 0 | 0 | 0 | — | |

Source: [ Cricinfo], NZC

=== Points summary ===
| Team | Group matches | | | | | | | | | | Play-offs |
| Team | 1 | 2 | 3 | 4 | 5 | 6 | 7 | 8 | 9 | 10 | F |
|---|---|---|---|---|---|---|---|---|---|---|---|
| Auckland Hearts | | | | | | | | | | | |
| Canterbury Magicians | | | | | | | | | | | |
| Central Hinds | | | | | | | | | | | |
| Northern Districts | | | | | | | | | | | |
| Otago Sparks | | | | | | | | | | | |
| Wellington Blaze | | | | | | | | | | | |

| Win | Loss | Tie | No result | Eliminated |

- Note: The total points at the end of each group match are listed.
- Note: Click on the points or results to see the match summary.

== Fixtures ==
Source: New Zealand Cricket

== Final ==
Final
21 February 2026
10:30
Scorecard

| v |

Basin Reserve, Wellington
