= 2019–20 Hallyburton Johnstone Shield =

- Dates: 16 November 2019 – 14 March 2020
- Administrator: New Zealand Cricket
- Cricket format: 50 over
- Tournament format(s): Round robin and final
- Champions: Auckland Hearts (20th title)
- Participants: 6
- Matches: 31
- Most runs: Caitlin Gurrey (576)
- Most wickets: Bella Armstrong (24)

The 2019–20 Hallyburton Johnstone Shield was a 50-over women's cricket competition, the third season with the name Hallyburton Johnstone Shield, that took place in New Zealand. It ran from November 2019 to March 2020, with 6 provincial teams taking part. Auckland Hearts beat Northern Spirit in the final to win the tournament.

The tournament ran alongside the 2019–20 Super Smash.

== Competition format ==
Teams played in a double round-robin in a group of six, therefore playing 10 matches overall. Matches were played using a one day format with 50 overs per side. The top two in the group advanced to the final.

The group worked on a points system with positions being based on the total points. Points were awarded as follows:

Win: 4 points
Tie: 2 points
Loss: 0 points.
Abandoned/No Result: 2 points.
Bonus Point: 1 point awarded for run rate in a match being 1.25x that of opponent.

== Points table ==
Team	Pld	W	L	T	NR	A	BP	Pts	NRR
Northern Spirit	10	8	1	0	1	0	3	37	0.843
Auckland Hearts	10	6	3	0	1	0	3	29	0.436
Canterbury Magicians	10	5	4	0	0	1	2	24	0.248
Central Hinds	10	4	4	0	1	1	3	23	0.296
Wellington Blaze	10	3	5	0	1	1	3	19	0.135
Otago Sparks	10	0	9	0	0	1	0	2	–2.107

Source: New Zealand Cricket

Advanced to the Final

== Final ==
14 March 2020
Scorecard

Auckland Hearts; 322/5 (50 overs)	v	Northern Spirit; 255 (44.5 overs)
Arlene Kelly 110 (121); Lauren Heaps 2/56 (10 overs)		Felicity Leydon-Davis 124 (120); Fran Jonas 3/46 (7.5 overs)

Auckland Hearts won by 67 runs
Seddon Park, Hamilton
Umpires: Billy Bowden and Kim Cotton

- Auckland Hearts won the toss and elected to bat.

== Statistics ==
=== Most runs ===
Player	Team	Matches	Innings	Runs	Average	HS	100s	50s
Caitlin Gurrey	Northern Spirit	11	11	576	72.00	123	2	4
Frances Mackay	Canterbury Magicians	8	7	569	94.83	115	4	1
Felicity Leydon-Davis	Northern Spirit	11	10	421	52.62	124	1	2
Jessica McFadyen	Wellington Blaze	9	9	400	66.66	153*	1	1
Natalie Dodd	Central Hinds	9	9	385	48.12	86*	0	3

Source: ESPN Cricinfo

=== Most wickets ===
Player	Team	Overs	Wickets	Average	BBI	5w
Bella Armstrong	Auckland Hearts	91.2	24	14.95	7/18	1
Eimear Richardson	Northern Spirit	89.0	22	19.90	4/28	0
Frances Mackay	Canterbury Magicians	74.0	13	16.69	4/20	0
Sarah Asmussen	Canterbury Magicians	59.0	13	23.38	4/23	0
Anna Peterson	Auckland Hearts	59.2	11	19.63	4/43	0

Source: ESPN Cricinfo
