= 2011–12 Action Cricket Cup =

- Dates: 3 December 2011 – 14 January 2012
- Administrator: New Zealand Cricket
- Cricket format: 50 over
- Tournament format(s): Round robin and final
- Champions: Auckland Hearts (16th title)
- Participants: 6
- Matches: 16
- Most runs: Frances Mackay (320)
- Most wickets: Rachel Candy (12)

The 2011–12 Action Cricket Cup was a 50-over women's cricket competition that took place in New Zealand. It ran from December 2011 to January 2012, with 6 provincial teams taking part. Auckland Hearts beat Canterbury Magicians in the final to win the competition.

The tournament ran alongside the 2011–12 Action Cricket Twenty20.

== Competition format ==
Teams played in a round-robin in a group of six, therefore playing 5 matches overall. Matches were played using a one day format with 50 overs per side. The top two in the group advanced to the final.

The group worked on a points system with positions being based on the total points. Points were awarded as follows:

Win: 4 points
Tie: 2 points
Loss: 0 points.
Abandoned/No Result: 2 points.
Bonus Point: 1 point awarded for run rate in a match being 1.25x that of opponent.

== Points table ==
Team	Pld	W	L	T	NR	A	BP	Pts	NRR
Canterbury Magicians	5	5	0	0	0	0	2	22	0.998
Auckland Hearts	5	2	1	0	1	1	2	14	0.796
Wellington Blaze	5	2	1	0	1	1	2	14	0.580
Northern Spirit	5	1	2	0	1	1	1	9	0.150
Otago Sparks	5	1	4	0	0	0	0	4	–0.700
Central Hinds	5	0	3	0	1	1	0	4	–1.602

Source: ESPN Cricinfo

Advanced to the Final

== Final ==
14 January 2012
Scorecard

Canterbury Magicians; 201/7 (50 overs)	v	Auckland Hearts; 202/5 (45.5 overs)
Frances Mackay 93 (153); Saskia Bullen 2/43 (10 overs)		Stafanie Taylor 110 (143); Rachel Candy 2/26 (7.5 overs)

Auckland Hearts won by 5 wickets
MainPower Oval, Rangiora
Umpires: Kathy Cross and Peter Gasston

- Auckland Hearts won the toss and elected to field.

== Statistics ==
=== Most runs ===
Player	Team	Matches	Innings	Runs	Average	HS	100s	50s
Frances Mackay	Canterbury Magicians	6	6	320	80.00	93	0	2
Amy Satterthwaite	Canterbury Magicians	6	5	271	90.33	124*	1	2
Liz Perry	Wellington Blaze	4	4	188	47.00	101	1	0
Katey Martin	Otago Sparks	5	5	168	33.60	90	0	2
Stafanie Taylor	Auckland Hearts	5	4	166	55.33	110	1	0

Source: ESPN Cricinfo

=== Most wickets ===
Player	Team	Overs	Wickets	Average	BBI	5w
Rachel Candy	Canterbury Magicians	50.5	12	12.25	3/29	0
Kelly Anderson	Canterbury Magicians	48.1	11	17.09	4/41	0
Erin Bermingham	Canterbury Magicians	41.0	8	15.12	3/8	0
Nicola Browne	Northern Spirit	33.5	7	16.85	5/31	1
Frances Mackay	Canterbury Magicians	51.0	7	24.42	3/12	0

Source: ESPN Cricinfo
