= Munokoa Tunupopo =

New Zealand cricketer (born 1984)

Personal information
- Full name: Munokoa Fellesite Tunupopo
- Born: 23 February 1984 (age 42); Tokoroa, New Zealand
- Batting: Right-handed
- Bowling: Right-arm medium
- Role: Bowler

International information
- National side: New Zealand (2000)
- ODI debut (cap 81): 17 February 2000 v England
- Last ODI: 22 February 2000 v England

Domestic team information
- Years: Team
- 1998/99–2000/01: Auckland

Career statistics
| Competition | WODI | WLA |
|---|---|---|
| Matches | 3 | 39 |
| Runs scored | – | 8 |
| Batting average | – | 1.33 |
| 100s/50s | – | 0/0 |
| Top score | – | 4* |
| Balls bowled | 108 | 1,760 |
| Wickets | 0 | 50 |
| Bowling average | – | 19.92 |
| 5 wickets in innings | 0 | 1 |
| 10 wickets in match | 0 | 0 |
| Best bowling | – | 7/19 |
| Catches/stumpings | 2/– | 6/– |
- Source: CricketArchive, 17 November 2021

Munokoa Fellesite Tunupopo (born 23 February 1984) is a New Zealand former cricketer who played as a right-arm medium bowler. She appeared in 3 One Day Internationals for New Zealand in 2000, becoming, at age 15, the youngest player to represent New Zealand. She played domestic cricket for Auckland, and was the youngest domestic cricketer on record when she began playing.

== Early life and career ==
Tunupopo was born in 1984 in Tokoroa, Waikato, in the North Island of New Zealand, and attended Onehunga High School and Auckland Girls' Grammar School. In 1998 she began playing cricket for Auckland in the State Insurance Cup. At 14 years and nine months she was the youngest domestic cricketer in the history of the tournament, and was the leading wicket-taker, with 21 wickets, in the 1999/00 season. In February 2000, she played for New Zealand A against Australia Under-21s before, later that month, making her One Day International debut against England, becoming the youngest ever New Zealand international cricketer, at age 15. She went on to play three matches in the series, but did not take a wicket.
