= 2015–16 New Zealand Women's One-Day Competition =

- Dates: 28 November 2015 – 13 February 2016
- Administrator: New Zealand Cricket
- Cricket format: 50 over
- Tournament format(s): Round robin and final
- Champions: Auckland Hearts (18th title)
- Participants: 6
- Matches: 31
- Most runs: Amy Satterthwaite (512)
- Most wickets: Frances Mackay (17)

The 2015–16 New Zealand Women's One-Day Competition was a 50-over women's cricket competition that took place in New Zealand. It ran from November 2015 to February 2016, with 6 provincial teams taking part. Auckland Hearts beat Wellington Blaze in the final to win the competition, their second 50-over title in two years.

The tournament ran alongside the 2015–16 New Zealand Women's Twenty20 Competition.

== Competition format ==
Teams played in a double round-robin in a group of six, therefore playing 10 matches overall. Matches were played using a one day format with 50 overs per side. The top two in the group advanced to the final.

The group worked on a points system with positions being based on the total points. Points were awarded as follows:

Win: 4 points
Tie: 2 points
Loss: 0 points.
Abandoned/No Result: 2 points.
Bonus Point: 1 point awarded for run rate in a match being 1.25x that of opponent.

== Points table ==
Team	Pld	W	L	T	NR	A	BP	Pts	NRR
Auckland Hearts	10	7	2	0	0	1	5	35	0.366
Wellington Blaze	10	5	4	0	0	1	4	26	0.881
Canterbury Magicians	10	5	3	1	0	1	2	26	0.521
Otago Sparks	10	4	6	0	0	0	1	17	–0.254
Central Hinds	10	3	5	1	0	1	1	17	–0.318
Northern Spirit	10	2	6	0	0	2	0	12	–1.425

Source: ESPN Cricinfo

Advanced to the Final

== Final ==
12 February 2016
Scorecard

Wellington Blaze; 146 (45.2 overs)	v	Auckland Hearts; 148/2 (43 overs)
Rachel Priest 107 (117); Rosalind McNeill 4/20 (7.2 overs)		Samantha Curtis 65* (130); Amelia Kerr 1/32 (10 overs)

Auckland Hearts won by 8 wickets
Melville Park, Auckland
Umpires: John Dempsey and Kim Cotton

- Wellington Blaze won the toss and elected to bat.

== Statistics ==
=== Most runs ===
Player	Team	Matches	Innings	Runs	Average	HS	100s	50s
Amy Satterthwaite	Canterbury Magicians	9	9	512	102.40	102*	1	5
Suzie Bates	Otago Sparks	10	10	495	61.87	125*	1	3
Rachel Priest	Wellington Blaze	10	10	474	52.66	136*	2	1
Sophie Devine	Wellington Blaze	8	8	413	82.60	162*	1	2
Katie Perkins	Auckland Hearts	10	10	371	53.00	100*	1	3

Source: ESPN Cricinfo

=== Most wickets ===
Player	Team	Overs	Wickets	Average	BBI	5w
Frances Mackay	Canterbury Magicians	75.2	17	14.41	5/25	1
Rosalind McNeill	Auckland Hearts	50.3	16	13.00	4/20	0
Holly Huddleston	Auckland Hearts	71.0	15	17.66	3/30	0
Georgia Guy	Auckland Hearts	72.4	14	18.71	3/17	0
Hannah Rowe	Central Hinds	74.2	14	22.92	4/20	0

Source: ESPN Cricinfo
