= Nancy Browne =

New Zealand cricketer

Personal information
- Full name: Nancy Ariel Browne
- Born: 5 September 1913; Auckland, New Zealand
- Died: 10 October 1996 (aged 83); Auckland, New Zealand
- Batting: Right-handed
- Bowling: Left-arm medium
- Role: Bowler

International information
- National side: New Zealand (1935)
- Only Test (cap 2): 16 February 1935 v England

Domestic team information
- Years: Team
- 1935/36–1943/44: Auckland

Career statistics
Competition	WTest	WFC
Matches	1	3
Runs scored	5	33
Batting average	–	11.00
100s/50s	0/0	0/0
Top score	5*	21*
Balls bowled	78	246
Wickets	0	11
Bowling average	–	21.72
5 wickets in innings	0	1
10 wickets in match	0	0
Best bowling	–	7/39
Catches/stumpings	1/–	1/–
- Source: CricketArchive, 29 November 2021

Nancy Ariel Browne (5 September 1913 – 10 October 1996) was a New Zealand cricketer who played primarily as a left-arm medium bowler. She appeared in one Test match for New Zealand, their first, in 1935. She played domestic cricket for Auckland.
