= Mabel Corby =

New Zealand cricketer

Personal information
- Full name: Mabel Cecilia Corby
- Born: 25 October 1913; Whanganui, New Zealand
- Died: 1 October 1993 (aged 79)
- Batting: Right-handed
- Bowling: Right-arm medium
- Role: All-rounder

International information
- National side: New Zealand (1935)
- Only Test (cap 4): 16 February 1935 v England

Domestic team information
- Years: Team
- 1937/38: Wellington

Career statistics
| Competition | WTest | WFC |
|---|---|---|
| Matches | 1 | 2 |
| Runs scored | 13 | 18 |
| Batting average | 6.50 | 6.00 |
| 100s/50s | 0/0 | 0/0 |
| Top score | 12 | 12 |
| Balls bowled | 60 | 144 |
| Wickets | 0 | 1 |
| Bowling average | – | 52.00 |
| 5 wickets in innings | 0 | 0 |
| 10 wickets in match | 0 | 0 |
| Best bowling | – | 1/13 |
| Catches/stumpings | 0/– | 0/– |
- Source: CricketArchive, 29 November 2021

Mabel Cecilia Corby (25 October 1913 – 1 October 1993) was a New Zealand cricketer who played as a right-handed batter and right-arm medium bowler. She appeared in one Test match for New Zealand, their first, in 1935. She played domestic cricket for Wellington.

Born in Whanganui, Corby was the daughter of William Stewart Corby, who wrote for the Wanganui Herald newspaper for 40 years. She was educated at Gonville School, and became a primary school teacher specialising in physical education. As well as representing New Zealand in cricket, she was a field hockey player and trialled for the national team. She died in October 1993, and was buried in Aramoho Cemetery, Whanganui.
