= Losi Harford =

New Zealand cricketer

Personal information
- Full name: Losalini Ravucake Vuetibau Stephi Harford
- Born: 25 March 1973 (age 53); Bridgetown, Barbados
- Batting: Right-handed
- Bowling: Right-arm off break
- Role: All-rounder

International information
- National side: New Zealand (1997)
- ODI debut (cap 71): 5 November 1997 v Australia
- Last ODI: 8 November 1997 v Australia

Domestic team information
- Years: Team
- 1990/91–1997/98: Auckland
- 1999/00–2006/07: Wellington

Career statistics
Competition	WODI	WFC	WLA
Matches	3	17	92
Runs scored	20	244	1,638
Batting average	6.66	13.55	21.27
100s/50s	0/0	0/0	0/8
Top score	9	33	83
Balls bowled	42	1,248	1,363
Wickets	0	10	32
Bowling average	–	49.10	27.27
5 wickets in innings	0	0	1
10 wickets in match	0	0	0
Best bowling	–	3/31	5/22
Catches/stumpings	0/–	19/–	22/–
- Source: CricketArchive, 22 October 2021

Losalini Ravucake Vuetibau Stephi Harford (born 25 March 1973) is a New Zealand former cricketer who played as a right-arm off break bowler and right-handed batter. She appeared in 3 One Day Internationals for New Zealand in 1997. She played domestic cricket for Auckland and Wellington.

Harford and her family emigrated to New Zealand when she was five years old. Her family originates from Lasekau on the island of Bau. In 2010, she appeared in three matches for Fiji, as the team's inaugural captain. From 1985 to 1987 she played for the New Zealand national women's indoor cricket team.

In 2011 Harford suffered a stroke, which left her paralysed on one side of her body. She took up cycling to regain movement and began competing in road chair races.

In 2013, Cricket Fiji invited Harford to serve as Ambassador for the Women's Island Cricket Project.
