= Rebecca Burns (cricketer) =

New Zealand cricketer (born 1994)

Personal information
- Full name: Rebecca Maureen Burns
- Born: 30 September 1994 (age 32); Wellington, New Zealand
- Batting: Right-handed
- Bowling: Right-arm off break
- Role: Batter

International information
- National side: New Zealand
- T20I debut (cap 64): 4 December 2022 v Bangladesh
- Last T20I: 7 December 2022 v Bangladesh

Domestic team information
- Years: Team
- 2011/12–2015/16: Wellington
- 2016/17–2017/18: Central Districts
- 2018/19–present: Wellington

Career statistics
Competition	WT20I	WLA	WT20
Matches	2	71	65
Runs scored	20	1,495	760
Batting average	10.00	23.00	15.20
100s/50s	0/0	0/8	0/2
Top score	20	72*	62
Balls bowled	–	318	54
Wickets	–	8	2
Bowling average	–	31.62	30.00
5 wickets in innings	–	0	0
10 wickets in match	–	0	0
Best bowling	–	2/33	1/9
Catches/stumpings	0/–	31/–	25/–
- Source: CricketArchive, 7 December 2022

Rebecca Maureen Burns (born 30 September 1994) is a New Zealand cricketer who currently plays for Wellington and New Zealand. She plays as a right-handed batter. She has previously played for Central Districts.

== Early life ==
Burns was born on 30 September 1994 in Wellington.

== Domestic career ==
Burns made her debut for Wellington on 10 December 2011, against Northern Districts in the Action Cricket Cup. Burns joined Central Districts ahead of the 2016–17 season, remaining at the club for two seasons before re-joining Wellington. In December 2018, Burns made her List A high score, with 72* in Wellington's 9 wicket victory over Northern Districts.

== International career ==
In December 2022, Burns was called up into the New Zealand squad for their T20I series against Bangladesh as cover for the injured Brooke Halliday. She made her Twenty20 International debut in the second match of the series, in which she scored 20 from 19 deliveries.
