= Bella Armstrong =

New Zealand cricketer

Personal information
- Full name: Bella Grace Armstrong
- Born: 16 November 1999 (age 26); Auckland, New Zealand
- Batting: Right-handed
- Bowling: Right-arm medium
- Role: All-rounder

International information
- National side: New Zealand
- Only T20I (cap 66): 8 October 2023 v South Africa

Domestic team information
- Years: Team
- 2015/16–present: Auckland
- 2023: Dragons

Career statistics
Competition	WT20I	WLA	WT20
Matches	1	64	67
Runs scored	11	583	623
Batting average	11.00	19.43	15.19
100s/50s	0/0	1/2	0/1
Top score	11	163*	71
Balls bowled	–	1,952	891
Wickets	–	62	35
Bowling average	–	21.87	28.77
5 wickets in innings	–	1	0
10 wickets in match	–	0	0
Best bowling	–	7/18	3/18
Catches/stumpings	0/–	13/–	22/–
- Source: CricketArchive, 30 October 2023

Bella Grace Armstrong (born 16 November 1999) is a New Zealand cricketer who currently plays for Auckland. She plays as a right-handed batter and right-arm medium bowler. She has also played for Irish side Dragons.

She made her international debut in October 2023, in a Twenty20 International for New Zealand against South Africa.

== Early and personal life ==
Armstrong was born on 16 November 1999 in Auckland. Armstrong is studying for a degree in sports science at Massey University.

== Domestic career ==
Armstrong made her debut for Auckland in the 2015–16 New Zealand Women's One-Day Competition, against Northern Districts. She was the third-highest wicket-taker in the 2017–18 New Zealand Women's Twenty20 Competition, with 14 wickets at an average of 10.85. In the 2019–20 Hallyburton Johnstone Shield, in a match against Otago, Armstrong took 7/18 from her 9 overs, helping bowling the opposition out for 74. She went on to be the leading wicket-taker in the Hallyburton Johnstone Shield that season, with 24 wickets at an average of 14.95.

In April 2023, it was announced that Armstrong was joining Dragons as an overseas player for the upcoming Super 20 Trophy and Super 50 Cup in Ireland. In the opening match of the Super 50 Cup, Armstrong hit 163* against Typhoons, the record for the highest individual score in the competition.

== International career ==
Armstrong earned her first call-up to the New Zealand squad in August 2023 for the Twenty20 International series of the side's tour of South Africa. She made her international debut in the second match of the T20I series, scoring 11 in a rain-curtailed match.
