= Lance Dry =

New Zealand cricketer (born 1975)

Personal information
- Born: 14 December 1975 (age 50); Wellington, New Zealand
- Source: Cricinfo, 24 October 2020

Lance Dry (born 14 December 1975) is a New Zealand cricketer. He played in five first-class matches for Wellington from 1994 to 1999.

== See also ==
- List of Wellington representative cricketers
