= Saskia Bullen =

New Zealand cricketer (born 1983)

Personal information
- Full name: Saskia Mary Bullen
- Born: 20 July 1983 (age 43); Auckland, New Zealand
- Batting: Right-handed
- Bowling: Slow left-arm orthodox
- Role: Bowler

International information
- National side: New Zealand (2009–2010)
- T20I debut (cap 29): 2 June 2009 v Australia
- Last T20I: 23 February 2010 v Australia

Domestic team information
- Years: Team
- 2003/04–2011/12: Auckland

Career statistics
Competition	WT20I	WLA	WT20
Matches	3	72	36
Runs scored	–	101	9
Batting average	–	7.21	4.50
100s/50s	–	0/0	0/0
Top score	–	19*	5
Balls bowled	54	3,186	786
Wickets	3	56	29
Bowling average	19.00	35.35	23.68
5 wickets in innings	0	0	0
10 wickets in match	0	0	0
Best bowling	2/20	3/10	3/12
Catches/stumpings	0/–	16/–	6/–
- Source: CricketArchive, 21 April 2021

Saskia Mary Bullen (born 20 July 1983) is a New Zealand former cricketer who played as a slow left-arm orthodox bowler. She appeared in three Twenty20 Internationals for New Zealand between 2009 and 2010. She played domestic cricket for Auckland.
