= Ingrid Cronin-Knight =

New Zealand cricketer (born 1977)

Personal information
- Full name: Ingrid Cronin-Knight
- Born: 6 October 1977 (age 49); Auckland, New Zealand
- Batting: Right-handed
- Role: Batter

International information
- National side: New Zealand (2008)
- ODI debut (cap 109): 28 February 2008 v England
- Last ODI: 3 March 2008 v England

Domestic team information
- Years: Team
- 2000/01–2007/08: Auckland

Career statistics
Competition	WODI	WLA	WT20
Matches	3	67	5
Runs scored	41	1,104	171
Batting average	13.66	24.53	57.00
100s/50s	0/0	0/5	0/2
Top score	36	84	61*
Balls bowled	–	1	–
Wickets	–	0	–
Bowling average	–	–	–
5 wickets in innings	–	0	–
10 wickets in match	–	0	–
Best bowling	–	–	–
Catches/stumpings	0/–	29/–	0/–
- Source: CricketArchive, 14 April 2021

Ingrid Cronin-Knight (born 6 October 1977) is a New Zealand former cricketer who played as a right-handed batter. She appeared in 3 One Day Internationals for New Zealand in 2008. She played domestic cricket for Auckland, and captained them in the 2007/08 season.
