= Hutt Recreation Ground =

Sports ground in Wellington, New Zealand

Coordinates: 41°12′56.62″S 174°54′16.79″E

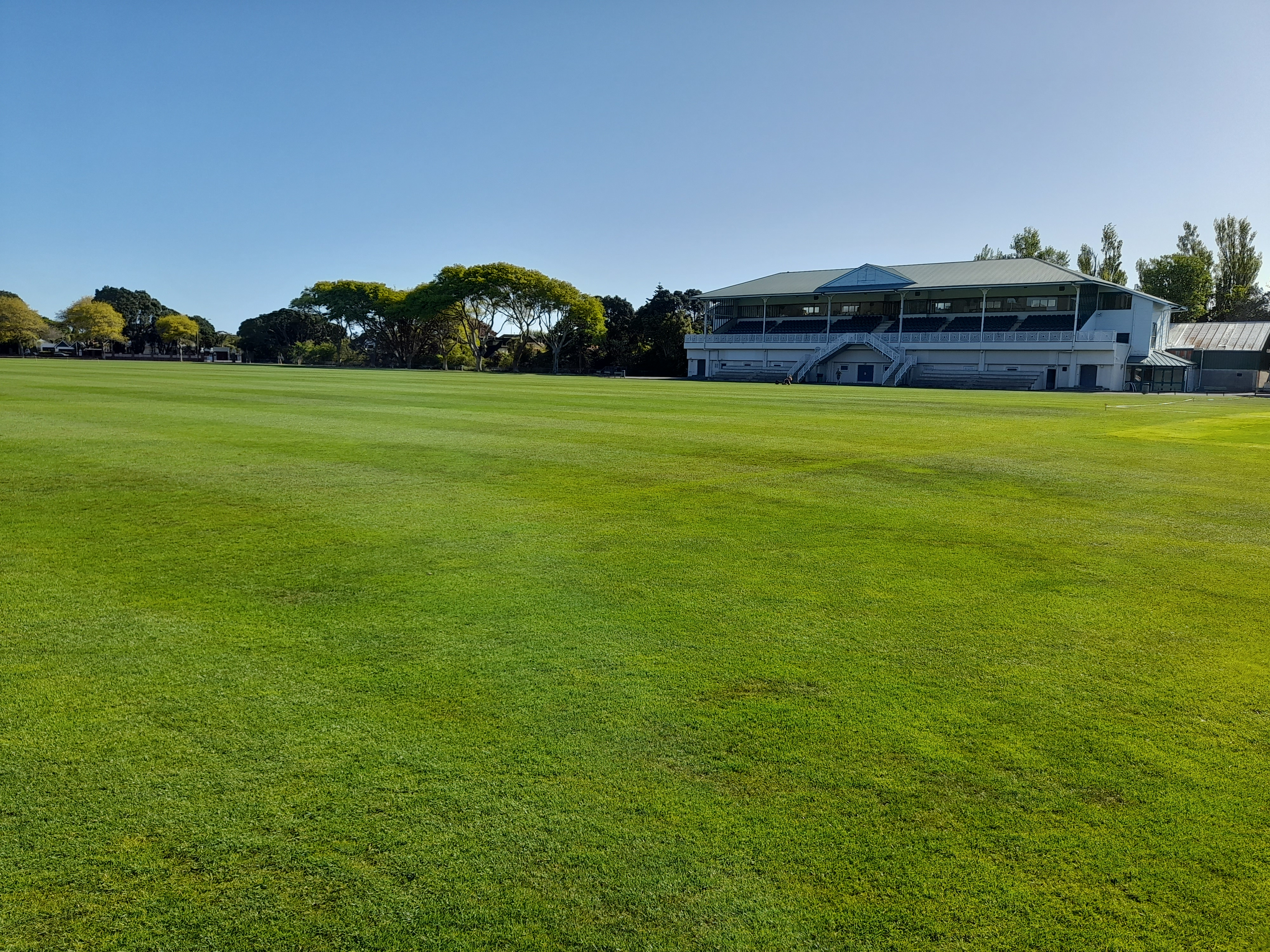
- The ground in 2022
- Interactive map of Hutt Recreation Ground

Ground information
- Location: Lower Hutt, New Zealand
- Country: New Zealand
- Establishment: 1905
- Capacity: 9,000

International information
- First women's ODI: 28 January 1982: India v International XI
- Last women's ODI: 11 February 1990: New Zealand v Australia

Team information
| Wellington | (1971–1986) |
- As of 1 September 2020; Source: Ground profile

The Hutt Recreation Ground is a football, cricket, athletics and rugby union ground in Lower Hutt, Wellington, New Zealand. The grounds are owned by the Hutt City Council and managed for them by Downer.

== History ==
In 1905 the area was first used for recreation when the lot was used by the Hutt Amateur Athletic Club. It was subsequently purchased by the city council and in 1908 the premises were upgraded. During World War I the ground was used by the council to grow potatoes to assist with food production for the war effort. The first grandstand at the ground was constructed in 1933 as part of a public works scheme to provide employment relief during the Great Depression.

It is the home ground for the Hutt District Cricket Club, which was established in 1909. The cricket ground was opened in November 1905 with a one-innings match between Married and Single. The first inter-provincial cricket match held on the ground came in February 1949 when Hutt Valley defeated Nelson in the Hawke Cup.

A single List A cricket match was played there in 1971 when Wellington played Central Districts in the 1971/72 New Zealand Motor Corporation Knock-Out, which Wellington won by 47 runs. The ground held its first first-class match during the 1976/77 Shell Trophy when Wellington played Northern Districts. Wellington defeated the West Indies in a three-day match at the ground in February 1980, with Ewen Chatfield claiming 13 wickets. Between the 1976/77 and 1985/86 seasons, the ground held 14 first-class matches, the last of which saw Wellington play Canterbury. Between 1982 and 1990, four Women's One Day Internationals were held there.

In rugby union the ground is used by the Hutt Old Boys-Marist, while in rugby league the Wellington rugby league team has played there. The ground has also hosted international football matches, including a match in the 1987 Trans-Tasman Cup between New Zealand and Australia.

In 1976 the ground hosted the Men's Softball World Championship. The tournament was controversial due to the participation of Apartheid era South Africa. Prior to its start, an opponent to South Africa's involvement, planted an incendiary bomb in the middle of the ground's softball diamond which exploded and damaged a 10 metre radius. Several city council members, led by councillor John Seddon, unsuccessfully tried to block the South African team playing.

In September 2014, it was announced that A-League club Wellington Phoenix would host three matches of the 2014–15 A-League at the ground due to their permanent home ground, Wellington Regional Stadium, being temporarily unavailable whilst hosting the 2015 Cricket World Cup. Temporary seating increase the venue to 9,000-capacity.

During the 2023 Bunnings NPC the Wellington Regional Stadium was temporarily unavailable whilst hosting the 2023 FIFA Women's World Cup. Accordingly Wellington hosted two Ranfurly Shield matches at the Hutt Recreation Ground. They won both games, defeating South Canterbury 67 to 21 and Southland 39 to 17.
