= Jess McFadyen =

New Zealand cricketer (born 1991)

Personal information
- Full name: Jessica Toihi McFadyen
- Born: 5 October 1991 (age 35); Wellington, New Zealand
- Batting: Right-handed
- Role: Wicket-keeper

International information
- National side: New Zealand
- ODI debut (cap 147): 11 December 2022 v Bangladesh
- Last ODI: 17 December 2022 v Bangladesh
- Only T20I (cap 63): 2 December 2022 v Bangladesh

Domestic team information
- Years: Team
- 2015/16–present: Wellington

Career statistics
Competition	WODI	WT20I	WLA	WT20
Matches	1	1	56	50
Runs scored	–	–	1,384	180
Batting average	–	–	36.42	10.00
100s/50s	–	–	2/6	0/0
Top score	–	–	153*	28
Catches/stumpings	1/1	0/0	47/22	21/26
Medal record
Representing New Zealand
Women's Cricket
Commonwealth Games
Bronze medal – third place	2022 Birmingham	Team
- Source: CricketArchive, 13 February 2023

Jessica Toihi McFadyen (born 5 October 1991) is a New Zealand cricketer who plays as a wicket-keeper for the Wellington Blaze. In November 2020, in the second round of the 2020–21 Hallyburton Johnstone Shield tournament, McFadyen scored 107 runs. She finished the tournament as the leading run-scorer for Wellington, with 397 runs in ten matches.

In May 2021, McFadyen was offered her first contract with the New Zealand women's cricket team. In August 2021, McFadyen earned her maiden call-up to the New Zealand women's cricket team, for their tour of England.

In June 2022, McFadyen was named in New Zealand's team for the cricket tournament at the 2022 Commonwealth Games in Birmingham, England. She made her Twenty20 International debut on 2 December 2022, against Bangladesh, but fell ill during the game and did not bat or keep wicket. She made her One Day International debut on 11 December 2022, also against Bangladesh, taking one catch and making one stumping.

In 2024, McFadyen was named vice-captain of the New Zealand Māori women's cricket team for the 2024 Women's T20I Pacific Cup.
