= Hallyburton Johnstone Shield =

- Countries: New Zealand
- Administrator: New Zealand Cricket
- Format: Limited overs cricket (50 overs per side)
- First edition: 1935–36
- Latest edition: 2025–26
- Next edition: 2026–27
- Tournament format: Double round-robin
- Number of teams: 6
- Current champion: Northern Districts
- Most successful: Canterbury (39 titles)
- Website: Hallyburton Johnstone Shield

The Hallyburton Johnstone Shield is the premier domestic women's one-day cricket competition in New Zealand. The tournament began in 1935–36, as a first-class competition, but is now played as a 50-over competition, with six provincial teams taking part: Auckland, Canterbury, Central Districts, Northern Districts, Otago and Wellington. The tournament now runs alongside the Twenty20 Women's Super Smash.

The most successful side in the history of the competition are Canterbury, with 38 outright title wins and 1 shared title. The current holders are Otago, who beat Auckland in the final of the 2024–25 season.

== History ==
The tournament began in 1935–36 as the Hallyburton Johnstone Challenge Shield, after the interest generated from England's tour of New Zealand in 1934–35. Hallyburton Johnstone, from Auckland, gave a trophy to Auckland and any other team was allowed to challenge them for the title. The first match was played in February 1936, with Wellington beating Auckland by 10 wickets.

From then until 1945–46, the tournament was played on a "challenge basis", with teams challenging the holders of the title. In 1946–47 the tournament was played as a round-robin tournament and renamed simply the Hallyburton Johnstone Shield, with 4 teams competing: Auckland, Wellington, Canterbury and Otago. Matches at this point were mainly 2-day games, with some years using 3- or 4-day matches. North Shore joined the competition in 1965–66 and Central Districts in 1979–80. In 1981–82, they played 60-over matches as preparation for the World Cup that year.

In 1982–83 the tournament was renamed the Hansells Cup. In 1983–84, Southern Districts replaced Otago for five seasons, and then afterwards the tournament went back to 5 teams competing. In 1990–91, the tournament was renamed the Pub Charities National Tournament and from 1996–97 onwards matches have always been 50-over games. Canterbury dominated this period, winning 20 out of 21 titles between 1978–79 and 1998–99.

In this period, various new teams competed: Canterbury B played for two seasons in 1990–91 and 1991–92 before being replaced by a Pub Charities XI for four seasons. North Shore were replaced by North Harbour in 1990–91, who competed until 1993–94. In 1992–93, a final was added for the top two teams in the group stage: prior to this, the winner of the group was the overall winner.

From 1998–99, the tournament became the State Insurance Cup, and then the State League from 2001–02 to 2008–09. The competition was named the Action Cricket Cup in 2010–11 and 2011–12 and the New Zealand Women's One-Day Competition between 2012–13 and 2016–17. From 2017–18 the tournament name reverted to the Hallyburton Johnstone Shield.

From 2007–08, the Twenty20 Super Smash began, and games from both tournaments were often played over the same weekend.

Canterbury (39 titles), Auckland (20 titles) and Wellington (18 titles) have been the most dominant sides in the history of the competition. North Shore won 3 titles between 1968–69 and 1971–72 and Central Districts have also won 3 titles, with their first coming in 2005–06. Otago have won four titles, in 1964–65, 2013–14, 2021–22 and 2023–24.

== Tournament names ==
Period	Name
1935–36 to 1945–46	Hallyburton Johnstone Challenge Shield
1946–47 to 1981–82	Hallyburton Johnstone Shield
1982–83 to 1989–90	Hansells Cup
1990–91 to 1997–98	New Zealand Pub Charities National Tournament
1998–99 to 2000–01	State Insurance Cup
2001–02 to 2008–09	State League
2009–10	New Zealand Cricket Women's One Day Competition
2010–11 to 2011–12	Action Cricket Cup
2012–13 to 2016–17	New Zealand Women's One-Day Competition
2017–18 to present	Hallyburton Johnstone Shield

== Teams ==
Team	First	Last	Titles
Auckland	1935–36	2025–26	20
Canterbury	1938–39	2025–26	39
Canterbury B	1990–91	1991–92	0
Central Districts	1979–80	2025–26	3
Combined XI (Note: Combined XI competed in 1965–66 to ensure each of the other five teams would not have a round with no match. Were not awarded points in the final standings.)	1965–66	1965–66	0
Northern Districts	1999–00	2025–26	1
North Harbour	1990–91	1993–94	0
North Shore	1965–66	1989–90	3
Otago	1939–40	2025–26	5
Pub Charities XI	1992–93	1993–94	0
Southern Districts	1983–84	1987–88	0
Wellington	1935–36	2025–26	18

The Canterbury and Wellington totals include one shared title.

== Results ==
Season	Winners	Runners-up	Match format	Ref
1935–36	Wellington	Auckland	2 days	
1937–38	Wellington	Auckland	2 days	
1938–39	Wellington	Canterbury	2 days	
1939–40	Auckland	Wellington	2 days	
1940–41	Auckland	Wellington	3 days	
1943–44	Canterbury	Wellington	2 days	
1944–45	Canterbury	Wellington	3 days	
1945–46	Canterbury	Wellington	2 days	
1946–47	Auckland	Wellington	3 days	
1947–48	Auckland	Wellington	4 days	
1948–49	Auckland	Canterbury	4 days	
1949–50	Wellington	Auckland	2 days	
1950–51	Wellington	Canterbury	2 days	
1951–52	Auckland	Canterbury	3 days	
1952–53	Wellington	Auckland	3 days	
1953–54	Wellington	Auckland	3 days	
1954–55	Auckland	Canterbury	3 days	
1955–56	Canterbury	Auckland	2 days	
1956–57	Auckland	Wellington	2 days	
1957–58	Auckland	Otago	2 days	
1958–59	Wellington	Auckland	2 days	
1959–60	Wellington	Canterbury	2 days	
1960–61	Canterbury	Otago	2 days	
1961–62	Canterbury	Auckland	2 days	
1962–63	Otago	Auckland	2 days	
1963–64	Canterbury	Otago	2 days	
1964–65	Auckland	Wellington	2 days	
1965–66	Auckland	Canterbury	2 days	
1966–67	Canterbury	Auckland	2 days	
1967–68	Wellington	Auckland	2 days	
1968–69	North Shore	Wellington	2 days	
1969–70	Wellington	North Shore	2 days	
1970–71	North Shore	Canterbury	2 days	
1971–72	North Shore	Wellington	2 days	
1972–73	Canterbury	North Shore	2 days	
1973–74	Wellington	Canterbury	2 days	
1974–75	Wellington	Canterbury	2 days	
1975–76	Canterbury	North Shore	2 days	
1976–77	Wellington	Auckland	2 days	
1977–78	Wellington	Canterbury	2 days	
1978–79	Canterbury	Wellington	2 days	
1979–80	Canterbury	Auckland	2 days	
1980–81	Canterbury	Wellington	2 days	
1981–82	Canterbury	Wellington	60 overs	
1982–83	Canterbury	Central Districts	2 days	
1983–84	Canterbury	North Shore	2 days	
1984–85	Canterbury	North Shore	2 days	
1985–86	Canterbury	North Shore	2 days	
1986–87	Canterbury	North Shore	2 days	
1987–88	Canterbury	North Shore	60 overs	
1988–89	Canterbury	North Shore	60 overs	
1989–90	Wellington	Canterbury	2 days	
1990–91	Canterbury	Wellington	2 days	
1991–92	Canterbury	Wellington	2 days	
1992–93	Canterbury	Auckland	50 overs	
1993–94	Canterbury	Wellington	50 overs	
1994–95	Canterbury	Auckland	3 days, 50 overs	
1995–96	Canterbury	Auckland	3 days, 50 overs	
1996–97	Canterbury	Auckland	50 overs	
1997–98	Canterbury	Auckland	50 overs	
1998–99	Canterbury	Auckland	50 overs	
1999–00	Auckland	Canterbury	50 overs	
2000–01	Auckland	Canterbury	50 overs	
2001–02	Auckland	Canterbury	50 overs	
2002–03	Auckland	Canterbury	50 overs	
2003–04	Title shared between Canterbury and Wellington		50 overs	
2004–05	Canterbury	Auckland	50 overs	
2005–06	Central Districts	Canterbury	50 overs	
2006–07	Canterbury	Wellington	50 overs	
2007–08	Canterbury	Central Districts	50 overs	
2008–09	Canterbury	Wellington	50 overs	
2009–10	Central Districts	Wellington	50 overs	
2010–11	Canterbury	Wellington	50 overs	
2011–12	Auckland	Canterbury	50 overs	
2012–13	Canterbury	Auckland	50 overs	
2013–14	Otago	Auckland	50 overs	
2014–15	Auckland	Canterbury	50 overs	
2015–16	Auckland	Wellington	50 overs	
2016–17	Canterbury	Auckland	50 overs	
2017–18	Auckland	Wellington	50 overs	
2018–19	Central Districts	Auckland	50 overs	
2019–20	Auckland	Northern Districts	50 overs	
2020–21	Canterbury	Auckland	50 overs	
2021–22	Otago	Wellington	50 overs	
2022–23	Wellington	Canterbury	50 overs	
2023–24	Otago	Wellington	50 overs	
2024–25	Otago	Auckland	50 overs	
2025–26	Northern Districts	Wellington	50 overs	

== See also ==
- Plunket Shield
- The Ford Trophy
- Men's Super Smash
- Women's Super Smash
