= Liz Perry =

New Zealand cricketer and field hockey player

Personal information
- Full name: Elizabeth Cecilia Perry
- Born: 22 November 1987 (age 38); Taumarunui, New Zealand
- Batting: Right-handed
- Bowling: Right-arm medium
- Role: Batter
- Relatives: Maddy Green (wife)

International information
- National side: New Zealand
- ODI debut (cap 118): 4 July 2010 v Ireland
- Last ODI: 2 March 2017 v Australia
- T20I debut (cap 32): 8 May 2010 v Sri Lanka
- Last T20I: 22 February 2017 v Australia

Domestic team information
- Years: Team
- 2002/03–2004/05: Central Districts
- 2005/06–2019/20: Wellington
- 2010–2012: Yorkshire

Career statistics
Competition	WODI	WT20I	WLA	WT20
Matches	17	31	165	131
Runs scored	201	369	2,876	1,716
Batting average	22.33	16.77	27.65	25.23
100s/50s	0/1	0/1	2/17	0/4
Top score	70	50*	114	60*
Balls bowled	48	–	1,596	381
Wickets	0	–	39	17
Bowling average	–	–	32.35	24.23
5 wickets in innings	0	–	1	0
10 wickets in match	0	–	0	0
Best bowling	–	–	5/40	3/9
Catches/stumpings	3/–	12/–	62/–	58/–
- Source: CricketArchive, 22 April 2021

Elizabeth Cecilia Perry (born 22 November 1987) is a New Zealand former cricketer and hockey player. In cricket, she played as a right-handed batter and right-arm medium bowler. She appeared in 17 One Day Internationals and 31 Twenty20 Internationals for New Zealand. She played domestic cricket for Central Districts, Wellington and Yorkshire. In hockey, she also represented New Zealand internationally.

Perry attended Chanel College, Masterton. She has an honours degree in anthropology and psychology from Canterbury University and works for Global Elite Sports in Sports Recruitment and as a Player Transition Consultant.

In April 2019, Perry married New Zealand cricketer Maddy Green.
