= Deanna Doughty =

New Zealand cricketer (born 1993)

Personal information
- Full name: Deanna Mary Doughty
- Born: 7 December 1993 (age 32); Porirua, Wellington, New Zealand
- Batting: Right-handed
- Bowling: Legbreak

International information
- National side: New Zealand
- Source: Cricinfo, 20 September 2020

Deanna Doughty (born 7 December 1993) is a New Zealand cricketer who bowls leg spin. In February 2019, Doughty took a five-wicket haul for the Wellington Blaze in the Hallyburton Johnstone Shield tournament. In November 2019, she was named as the captain of the team.

In August 2020, she was named in New Zealand's squad for their series against Australia, earning her maiden call-up to the national team. Doughty has been part of the national setup since 2012, playing for the New Zealand Emerging Players team in their home series against England.
