= Paula Gruber =

New Zealand cricketer (born 1974)

Personal information
- Full name: Paula Anne Gruber
- Born: 30 November 1974 (age 51); Waiouru, Ruapehu, New Zealand
- Batting: Right-handed
- Bowling: Right-arm off break
- Role: Bowler

International information
- National side: New Zealand (2000)
- ODI debut (cap 79): 6 February 2000 v Australia
- Last ODI: 12 February 2000 v England

Domestic team information
- Years: Team
- 1994/95–1995/96: Central Districts
- 1996/97–2013/14: Auckland

Career statistics
Competition	WODI	WFC	WLA	WT20
Matches	2	6	121	43
Runs scored	0	98	312	39
Batting average	0.00	12.25	9.75	7.80
100s/50s	0/0	0/0	0/0	0/0
Top score	0	40	26	16*
Balls bowled	60	720	5,338	914
Wickets	0	6	134	40
Bowling average	–	50.66	21.47	20.27
5 wickets in innings	0	0	1	0
10 wickets in match	0	0	0	0
Best bowling	–	3/40	6/10	3/8
Catches/stumpings	0/–	0/–	31/–	8/–
- Source: CricketArchive, 26 April 2021

Paula Anne Gruber (born 30 November 1974) is a New Zealand former cricketer who played as a right-arm off break bowler. She appeared in 2 One Day Internationals for New Zealand in 2000. She played domestic cricket for Central Districts and Auckland.

In 2011 Gruber was awarded Women's Bowler of the Year at the Auckland Cricket Awards.
