= Georgia Guy =

New Zealand cricketer (born 1993)

Personal information
- Full name: Georgia Ann Guy
- Born: 25 November 1993 (age 32); Auckland, New Zealand
- Batting: Right-handed
- Bowling: Right-arm off break
- Role: Bowler

International information
- National side: New Zealand (2014–2015)
- ODI debut (cap 131): 12 September 2014 v West Indies
- Last ODI: 6 July 2015 v India
- T20I debut (cap 43): 23 September 2014 v West Indies
- Last T20I: 11 July 2015 v India

Domestic team information
- Years: Team
- 2011/12–2017/18: Auckland

Career statistics
Competition	WODI	WT20I	WLA	WT20
Matches	7	6	56	33
Runs scored	2	2	72	5
Batting average	2.00	2.00	6.00	2.50
100s/50s	0/0	0/0	0/0	0/0
Top score	2*	2	27*	3
Balls bowled	289	108	2,352	600
Wickets	9	3	71	26
Bowling average	19.66	33.33	19.80	22.00
5 wickets in innings	0	0	1	0
10 wickets in match	0	0	0	0
Best bowling	3/23	1/14	5/19	3/17
Catches/stumpings	1/–	0/–	13/–	5/–
- Source: Cricinfo, 15 April 2021

Georgia Ann Guy (born 26 November 1993) is a New Zealand former cricketer who played as a right-arm off break bowler. She appeared in 7 One Day Internationals and 6 Twenty20 Internationals for New Zealand between 2014 and 2015. She played domestic cricket for Auckland.
