= Lucy Doolan =

New Zealand cricketer (born 1987)

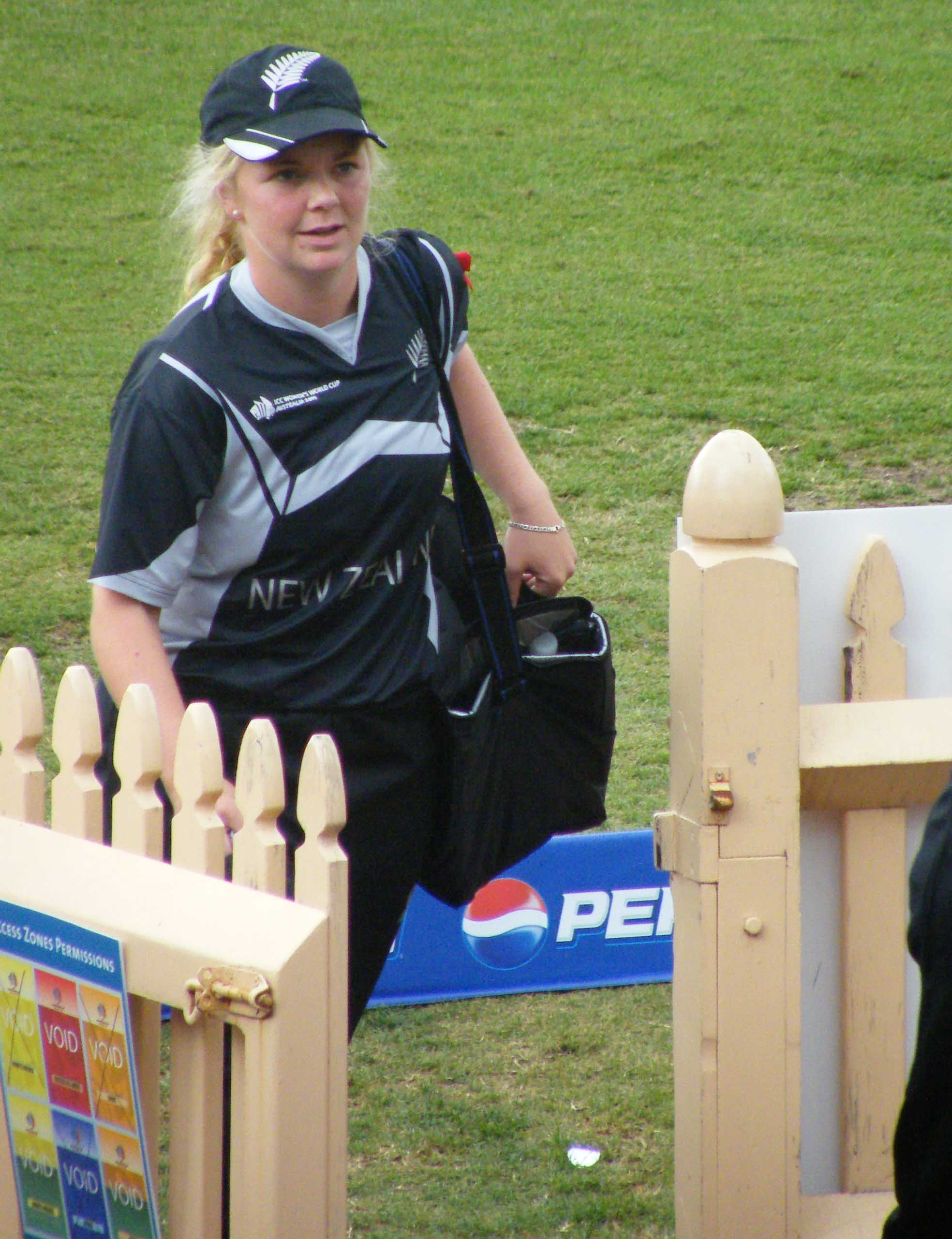

Personal information
- Full name: Lucy Rose Doolan
- Born: 11 December 1987 (age 38); Lower Hutt, Wellington, New Zealand
- Batting: Right-handed
- Bowling: Right-arm off break
- Role: All-rounder

International information
- National side: New Zealand (2008–2013)
- ODI debut (cap 110): 2 March 2008 v England
- Last ODI: 15 February 2013 v England
- T20I debut (cap 24): 6 March 2008 v Australia
- Last T20I: 24 January 2014 v Australia

Domestic team information
- Years: Team
- 2004/05–2018/19: Wellington Blaze
- 2009: Essex
- 2010: Nottinghamshire
- 2011/12: South Australia

Career statistics
Competition	WODI	WT20I	WLA	WT20
Matches	40	33	167	113
Runs scored	674	194	3,725	1,834
Batting average	21.74	9.70	25.00	20.84
100s/50s	0/1	0/0	2/20	0/9
Top score	76	41	102*	70*
Balls bowled	1,287	600	6,733	2,202
Wickets	32	28	182	110
Bowling average	31.34	21.50	25.03	19.71
5 wickets in innings	0	0	1	0
10 wickets in match	0	0	0	0
Best bowling	3/7	3/16	5/38	4/10
Catches/stumpings	18/–	5/–	62/–	21/–
- Source: CricketArchive, 11 April 2021

Lucy Rose Doolan (born 11 December 1987) is a New Zealand former cricketer who played as an all-rounder, batting right-handed and bowling right-arm off break. She appeared in 40 One Day Internationals and 33 Twenty20 Internationals for New Zealand between 2008 and 2013. She played domestic cricket for Wellington Blaze, as well as stints for Essex, Nottinghamshire and South Australia. In March 2019, she announced her retirement from all forms of cricket.
