= Leigh Kasperek =

New Zealander cricketer

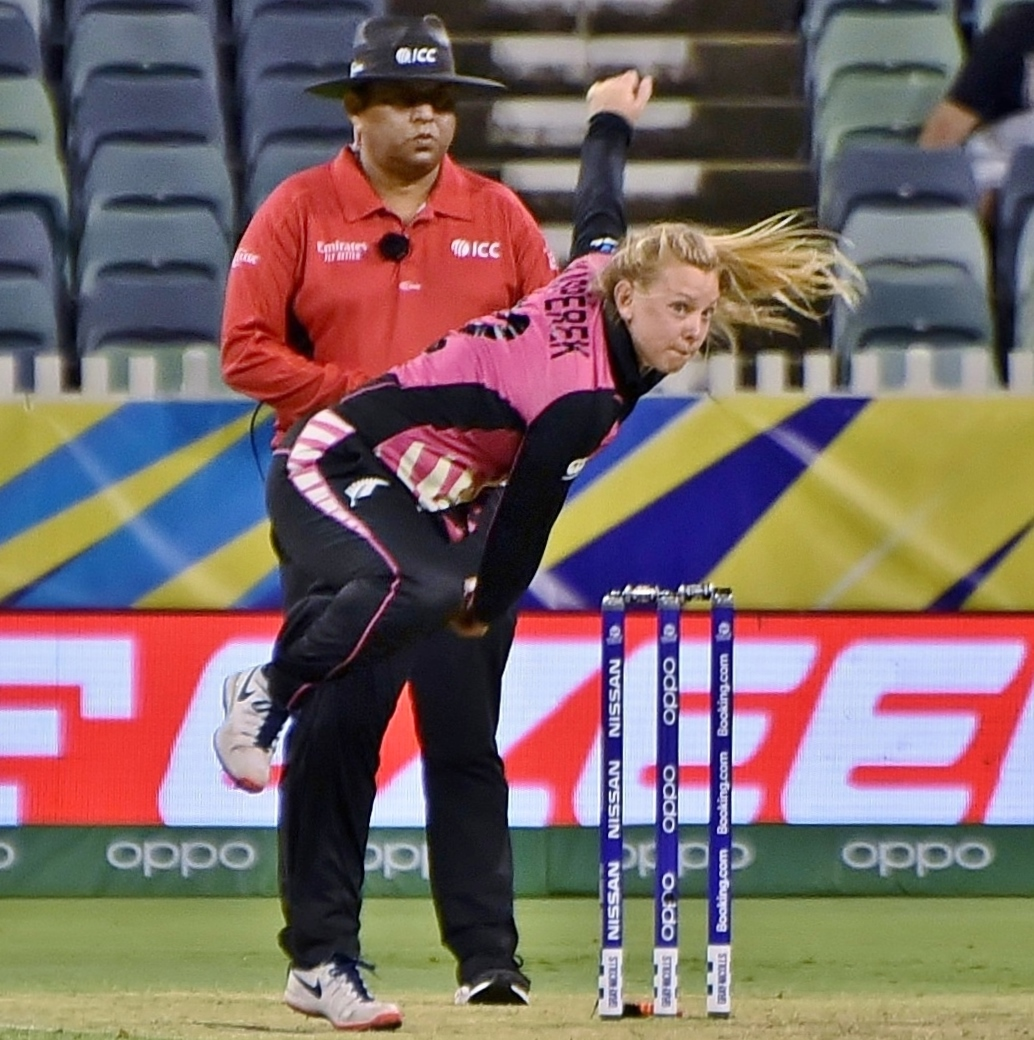
- Kasperek bowling for New Zealand during the 2020 ICC Women's T20 World Cup

Personal information
- Full name: Leigh Meghan Kasperek
- Born: 15 February 1992 (age 34); Edinburgh, Scotland
- Batting: Right-handed
- Bowling: Right-arm off break
- Role: Bowling all-rounder

International information
- National sides: Scotland (2007–2012); New Zealand (2015–present)
- ODI debut (cap 133): 28 June 2015; New Zealand v India
- Last ODI: 23 September 2021; New Zealand v England
- T20I debut (cap 46): 11 July 2015; New Zealand v India
- Last T20I: 12 October 2024; New Zealand v Sri Lanka
- T20I shirt no.: 62

Domestic team information
- Years: Team
- 2011/12: Western Australia
- 2012–2013: Essex
- 2012/13: Wellington
- 2013/14–2018/19: Otago
- 2018–2019: Yorkshire
- 2019: Yorkshire Diamonds
- 2019/20–present: Wellington
- 2020: Velocity
- 2022: Northern Diamonds

Career statistics
| Competition | WODI | WT20I |
|---|---|---|
| Matches | 39 | 52 |
| Runs scored | 299 | 119 |
| Batting average | 17.58 | 6.26 |
| 100s/50s | 1/0 | 0/0 |
| Top score | 113 | 19 |
| Balls bowled | 1,904 | 1,128 |
| Wickets | 65 | 81 |
| Bowling average | 19.43 | 14.86 |
| 5 wickets in innings | 2 | 0 |
| 10 wickets in match | 0 | 0 |
| Best bowling | 6/46 | 4/7 |
| Catches/stumpings | 12/– | 12/– |
Medal record
Representing New Zealand
Women's Cricket
T20 World Cup
| Winner | 2024 UAE |
- Source: ESPNcricinfo, 21 October 2024

Leigh Meghan Kasperek (born 15 February 1992) is a Scottish cricketer who plays internationally for the New Zealand national team. She previously played for the Scottish national side, but switched to New Zealand in order to play at a higher level.

== Scotland career ==
Born in Edinburgh, Kasperek made her senior national debut at the age of 15, playing for Scotland against English county sides in the 2007 County Challenge Cup. Her international debut came later in the year, when she appeared against Ireland and the Netherlands at the European Championship. Early in 2008, Kasperek was selected in Scotland's squad for the 2008 World Cup Qualifier in South Africa. She went on to play in four out of a possible five matches, but had little success, scoring only four runs and failing to take a wicket from her ten overs, while conceding 57 runs.

Over the next few years, Kasperek firmly established herself as one of Scotland's leading all-rounders. One of her first notable performances came against Hampshire in the 2009 edition of the County Championship, when she took 3/2 from six overs to help bowl the side out for 76. Later in the year, against the Netherlands at the 2009 European Championship, she scored a maiden half-century for Scotland, making 58 from 106 balls (including a 135-run partnership with Kari Anderson). During the 2010 County Championship season, Kasperek scored 218 runs from her ten matches, behind only Kathryn White for Scotland. Her best performance was an innings of 68 against Hampshire, which was her only half-century.

== Overseas experience ==
For the 2011–12 season, Kasperek signed for the Western Fury, a team in Australia's Women's National Cricket League (WNCL), also playing club cricket for Midland-Guildford. For the 2012 County Championship season, she switched from Scotland to Essex, although later in the year she did play one final international tournament, the European Twenty20 Qualifier in Ireland. Having been named Essex's player of the year, later in the year Kasperek signed for the Wellington Blaze, which plays in the New Zealand State League.

In 2022, Kasperek signed for Northern Diamonds as an overseas player for the upcoming season. She played 13 matches for the side that season, across the Charlotte Edwards Cup and the Rachael Heyhoe Flint Trophy, taking 14 wickets.

== New Zealand career ==
Kasperek had little success in her first season in New Zealand, with her eight matches yielding only 86 runs and a single wicket. For the 2013–14 season, she switched to the Otago Sparks (based in Dunedin), and went on to score two half-centuries. Kasperek impressed more with her bowling, taking 18 wickets to finish as the competition's leading wicket-taker, including figures of 6/8 in one match against Canterbury. The next season, she returned 15 wickets to be Otago's leading wicket taker and equal-fourth in the competition, but also lifted her batting, scoring 313 runs to place behind only Suzie Bates for Otago (and tenth in the competition).

After three seasons in the New Zealand domestic competition, Kasperek met the ICC qualifications for representing the national team, although that had not been a specific goal of hers when she first moved there. In May 2015, she was unexpectedly named in the squad for the 2015 tour of India. Kasperek went on to play in every game on the tour, which comprised five One Day International (ODI) and three Twenty20 International matches. On debut in the first ODI, she took 3/39 from 10 overs. Later in 2015, against the touring Sri Lankans, Kasperek took 4/27, her maiden ODI four-wicket haul.

In a Twenty20 International against Australia in February 2016, Kasperek took 4/7 from three overs. Amy Satterthwaite is the only New Zealander to take better figures.

In August 2018, she was awarded a central contract by New Zealand Cricket, following the tours of Ireland and England in the previous months. In October 2018, she was named in New Zealand's squad for the 2018 ICC Women's World Twenty20 tournament in the West Indies. She was the leading wicket-taker for New Zealand in the tournament, with eight dismissals in four matches.

In January 2020, she was named in New Zealand's squad for the 2020 ICC Women's T20 World Cup in Australia.

During the 2nd WODI of the Australia tour of New Zealand in 2020-21, Kasperek took all bar one of the seven wickets to fall in the Australian innings, finishing with figures of 6/46 from 10 overs, the 17th best innings figures in Women's ODI history. She finished as the leading wicket taker in the ODI leg of the series with 9 wickets, despite playing only two of the three matches.

In September 2024, she was named in the New Zealand squad for the 2024 ICC Women's T20 World Cup.
