= Wellington Blaze =

Personnel
- Captain: Leigh Kasperek (one-day); Amelia Kerr (T20)
- Coach: Lance Dry

Team information
- Colours: KKR
- Founded: First recorded match: 1934
- Home ground: Basin Reserve, Wellington
- Secondary home ground(s): Karori Park, Wellington; Hutt Recreation Ground, Lower Hutt

History
- First-class debut: Auckland in 1936 at Eden Park, Auckland
- HBJS wins: 18 (including 1 shared)
- SS wins: 8
- Official website: Cricket Wellington

The Wellington Blaze is the women's representative cricket team for the New Zealand city of Wellington. They play their home games at Basin Reserve. They compete in the Hallyburton Johnstone Shield one-day competition and the Women's Super Smash Twenty20 competition. They are the most successful side in the history of the Super Smash, with eight title wins.

== History ==
Wellington played in the first Hallyburton Johnstone Shield in 1935–36, in which they beat Auckland to claim the title. They subsequently defended the title over the next two seasons, before losing it to Auckland in 1939–40.

Wellington have gone on to win the Shield (under various names) 18 times. They had periods of dominance in the 1950s, where they won the title five times, and in the 1970s, where they won the title a further five times. Throughout the 1980s and 1990s, Canterbury dominated the competition, winning the title 20 out of 21 times, but Wellington were the side to break their streak, topping the points table in 1989–90 with three wins from four matches. They next won the one-day competition was in 2003–04, when they shared the trophy with Canterbury after the final was rained-off. Between 2006–07 and 2021–22, they lost in the final seven times, including three times in a row between 2008–09 and 2010–11, before again winning the competition in 2022–23, beating Canterbury in the final.

Wellington have also played in the Super Smash since its inaugural season in 2008–09, and are the most successful side in the history of the competition, with six title wins. They won the title in 2008–09, 2012–13, 2014–15 and three times in a row in 2017–18, 2018–19 and 2019–20. In 2020–21, they lost in the final to Canterbury by 4 wickets, despite a hat-trick from Wellington bowler Amelia Kerr, and Wellington batter Sophie Devine ending the season as the tournament's leading run-scorer. They regained their title in 2021–22, however, going unbeaten in the group stage before beating Otago Sparks in the final by 75 runs.

== Grounds ==
Wellington's primary home ground from their first match in 1937 until the 1950s was Basin Reserve, and they began using the ground consistently again from 2014. In between these periods, Wellington used grounds such as Kilbirnie Park in Wellington, Te Whiti Park in Lower Hutt and Petone Recreation Ground, also in Lower Hutt.

From the 2000s, Wellington began using Karori Park, Wellington, as well as Trentham Memorial Park, Upper Hutt. In 2021–22, they played most of their matches at Basin Reserve, as well as two at Karori Park. In 2022–23, they played most of their matches at Basin Reserve, as well as two at Hutt Recreation Ground.

== Players ==
=== Current squad ===
Based on squad for the 2023–24 season. Players in bold have international caps.

| No. | Name | Nationality | Birth date | Batting style | Bowling style | Notes |
Batters
| 18 | **Georgia Plimmer** | New Zealand | 8 February 2004 (age 22) | Right-handed | Right-arm medium | |
| 28 | Caitlin King | New Zealand | 5 September 1996 (age 29) | Right-handed | Right arm medium | |
| 30 | **Rebecca Burns** | New Zealand | 30 September 1994 (age 31) | Right-handed | Right-arm off break | |
All-rounders
| 48 | **Amelia Kerr** | New Zealand | 13 October 2000 (age 25) | Right-handed | Right-arm leg break | T20 Captain |
| 62 | **Leigh Kasperek** | New Zealand | 15 February 1992 (age 34) | Right-handed | Right-arm off break | One-Day Captain |
| 77 | **Sophie Devine** | New Zealand | 1 September 1989 (age 36) | Right-handed | Right-arm medium | |
Wicket-keepers
| 1 | Gemma Sims | New Zealand | 27 July 2001 (age 25) | Right-handed | – | |
| 5 | **Jess McFadyen** | New Zealand | 5 October 1991 (age 34) | Right-handed | — | |
| 15 | Antonia Hamilton | New Zealand | 15 April 2004 (age 22) | Right-handed | Right-arm medium | |
Bowlers
| 3 | Natasha Codyre | New Zealand | 29 October 2003 (age 22) | Right-handed | Right-arm medium | |
| 12 | Xara Jetly | New Zealand | 29 August 2001 (age 24) | Right-handed | Right-arm off break | |
| 14 | Nicole Baird | New Zealand | 6 August 1993 (age 32) | Right-handed | Slow left-arm orthodox | |
| 19 | Kate Chandler | New Zealand | 2 November 2006 (age 19) | Right-handed | Right-arm leg break | |
| 23 | Phoenix Williams | New Zealand | 20 December 1998 (age 27) | Right-handed | Right-arm medium | |
| 24 | **Jess Kerr** | New Zealand | 18 January 1998 (age 28) | Right-handed | Right arm medium | |
| 55 | Hannah Francis | New Zealand | 4 February 2006 (age 20) | Right-handed | Right-arm medium | |
| 58 | Monique Rees | New Zealand | 29 September 2000 (age 25) | Right-handed | Right-arm medium | |

=== Notable players ===
Players who have played for Wellington and played internationally are listed below, in order of first international appearance (given in brackets):

- (New Zealand) Hilda Buck (1935)
- (New Zealand) Mabel Corby (1935)
- (New Zealand) Agnes Ell (1935)
- (New Zealand) Phyl Blackler (1948)
- (New Zealand) Vi Farrell (1948)
- (New Zealand) Joan Francis (1948)
- (New Zealand) Billie Fulford (1948)
- (New Zealand) Joan Hatcher (1948)
- (New Zealand) Ina Lamason (1948)
- (New Zealand) Joy Lamason (1948)
- (New Zealand) Dot Bailey (1949)
- (New Zealand) Verna Coutts (1954)
- (New Zealand) Jean Coulston (1954)
- (New Zealand) Joyce Currie (1954)
- (New Zealand) Jean Stonell (1957)
- (New Zealand) Gwen Sutherland (1957)
- (New Zealand) Betty Thorner (1957)
- (Australia) Joyce Dalton (1958)
- (New Zealand) Jackie Lord (1966)
- (New Zealand) Trish McKelvey (1966)
- (New Zealand) Betty Maker (1966)
- (New Zealand) Wendy Coe (1966)
- (New Zealand) Barbara Bevege (1973)
- (New Zealand) Maureen Peters (1973)
- (New Zealand) Cheryl Henshilwood (1977)
- (New Zealand) Viv Sexton (1978)
- (New Zealand) Linda Lindsay (1978)
- (New Zealand) Linda Fraser (1982)
- (New Zealand) Mary Harris (1982)
- (England) Gillian McConway (1982)
- (Netherlands) Ingrid van der Elst (1982)
- (New Zealand) Di Caird (1984)
- (New Zealand) Jackie Clark (1984)
- (New Zealand) Nancy Williams (1985)
- (New Zealand) Julie Harris (1987)
- (New Zealand) Penny Kinsella (1988)
- (New Zealand) Maia Lewis (1992)
- (New Zealand) Karen Musson (1993)
- (New Zealand) Justine Russell (1995)
- (New Zealand) Jill Saulbrey (1995)
- (New Zealand) Justine Fryer (1996)
- (New Zealand) Anna Smith (1996)
- (New Zealand) Losi Harford (1997)
- (New Zealand) Erin McDonald (2000)
- (England) Mandie Godliman (2002)
- (New Zealand) Frances King (2002)
- (New Zealand) Anna Dodd (2002)
- (New Zealand) Fiona Fraser (2002)
- (New Zealand) Amanda Green (2003)
- (Australia) Kate Blackwell (2004)
- (Ireland) Eimear Richardson (2005)
- (England) Sarah Taylor (2006)
- (New Zealand) Sophie Devine (2006)
- (New Zealand) Rachel Priest (2007)
- (New Zealand) Lucy Doolan (2008)
- (Australia) Lauren Ebsary (2008)
- (New Zealand) Sian Ruck (2009)
- (New Zealand) Liz Perry (2010)
- (England) Fran Wilson (2010)
- (Netherlands) Kerry-Anne Tomlinson (2011)
- (New Zealand) Maddy Green (2012)
- (New Zealand) Leigh Kasperek (2015)
- (New Zealand) Thamsyn Newton (2015)
- (New Zealand) Amelia Kerr (2016)
- (Scotland) Priyanaz Chatterji (2018)
- (Australia) Erin Burns (2019)
- (New Zealand) Jess Kerr (2020)
- (New Zealand) Georgia Plimmer (2022)
- (New Zealand) Jess McFadyen (2022)
- (New Zealand) Rebecca Burns (2022)

== Coaching staff ==
- Head Coach: Lance Dry
- Batting Coach: Luke Woodcock

== Honours ==
- Hallyburton Johnstone Shield:
  - Winners (17): 1935–36, 1937–38, 1938–39, 1949–50, 1950–51, 1958–59, 1959–60, 1967–68, 1969–70, 1973–74, 1974–75, 1976–77, 1977–78, 1989–90, 2022–23; shared (1): 2003–04
- Women's Super Smash:
  - Winners (10): 2008–09, 2012–13, 2014–15, 2017–18, 2018–19, 2019–20, 2021–22, 2023–24, 2024–25, 2025–26

== See also ==
- Wellington cricket team
