= Auckland Hearts =

Personnel
- Captain: Maddy Green
- Coach: Donovan Grobbelaar

Team information
- Colours: AA
- Founded: First recorded match: 1935
- Home ground: Eden Park Outer Oval, Auckland
- Secondary home ground(s): Colin Maiden Park, Auckland

History
- First-class debut: Wellington in 1936 at Eden Park, Auckland
- HBJS wins: 20
- SS wins: 1
- Official website: Auckland Hearts

The Auckland Hearts is the women's representative cricket team for the New Zealand region of Auckland. They play their home games at Eden Park Outer Oval. They compete in the Hallyburton Johnstone Shield one-day competition and the Women's Super Smash Twenty20 competition.

== History ==
The first recorded match by an Auckland women's team was in 1935, against the touring England team, which ended in a draw. The played in the first Hallyburton Johnstone Shield in 1935–36, which they lost to Wellington. They won their first title in 1939–40, beating Wellington, and defended the Shield a year later against the same opposition.

They went on to win the Hallyburton Johnstone Shield 20 times overall, including three times in a row between 1946–47 and 1948–50 and four times in a row between 1999–00 and 2002–03. In 1959–60, Auckland competed in the Australian Women's Cricket Championships. In 1994–95, the side merged with North Harbour (previously North Shore). The side has won the title five times since 2011–12, with their most recent title coming in 2019–20. They beat Northern Districts in the final that season, with Arlene Kelly scoring 110 to set up a 67-run victory. In 2020–21, they lost in the final to Canterbury.

In 2007–08, Auckland played in the inaugural season of the Twenty20 Super Smash. They have won the tournament once, in 2013–14, beating Canterbury in the final.

== Grounds ==
Auckland have used various ground throughout their history. Their first match, against England, was played at Eden Park, Auckland. From the 1951–52 season, Auckland's primary home ground became Melville Park, Auckland. In the 1981–82 season, two matches were played at Hobson Park, Auckland.

The side returned to Eden Park in 1992–93, and from the 1998–99 season they also began using the secondary ground on the same site, the Eden Park Outer Oval. In 1996–97, Auckland began using Colin Maiden Park for some matches, and in the early 2000s they also used North Harbour Stadium, but their main ground remained Melville Park. Melville Park was last used in the 2019–20 season. Since, Auckland have played all their matches at the Eden Park Outer Oval, the main Eden Park ground, and Colin Maiden Park.

== Players ==
=== Current squad ===
Based on squad announced for the 2023–24 season. Players in bold have international caps.

No.	Name	Nationality	Birth date	Batting style	Bowling style	Notes
Batters
3	Cate Pedersen	New Zealand	31 July 2002 (age 23)	Right-handed	Right-arm medium	
5	**Maddy Green**	New Zealand	20 October 1992 (age 33)	Right-handed	Right-arm off break	Captain
7	Saachi Shahri	New Zealand	7 November 1997 (age 28)	Right-handed	Right-arm leg break	
All-rounders
16	**Brooke Halliday**	New Zealand	30 October 1995 (age 30)	Left-handed	Right-arm medium	
21	Prue Catton	New Zealand	3 July 2003 (age 22)	Right-handed	Right-arm leg break	
23	Skye Bowden	New Zealand	23 July 2001 (age 24)	Right-handed	Right-arm medium	
24	Anna Browning	New Zealand	24 October 2003 (age 22)	Right-handed	Right-arm medium-fast	
25	**Bella Armstrong**	New Zealand	16 November 1999 (age 26)	Right-handed	Right-arm medium	
61	Amberly Parr-Thomson	New Zealand	18 October 1998 (age 27)	Right-handed	Right-arm medium	
71	Makayla Templeton	New Zealand	10 October 2002 (age 23)	Right-handed	Right-arm leg break	
–	Kate Irwin	New Zealand	15 February 2006 (age 20)	Right-handed	Slow-left arm orthodox	
Wicket-keepers
13	**Izzy Gaze**	New Zealand	8 May 2004 (age 21)	Right-handed	—	
30	Elizabeth Buchanan	New Zealand	12 April 2006 (age 19)	Right-handed	—	
Bowlers
1	Rishika Jaswal	New Zealand	19 November 2006 (age 19)	Right-handed	Right-arm leg break	
10	Olivia Anderson	New Zealand	8 October 2003 (age 22)	Right-handed	Right-arm medium	
15	**Molly Penfold**	New Zealand	15 June 2001 (age 24)	Right-handed	Right-arm medium	
26	**Fran Jonas**	New Zealand	8 April 2004 (age 21)	Right-handed	Slow left-arm orthodox	
28	Amie Hucker	New Zealand	28 March 2002 (age 23)	Right-handed	Right-arm medium	
29	**Breearne Illing**	New Zealand	23 September 2003 (age 22)	Left-handed	Left-arm medium	
39	Josie Penfold	New Zealand	28 June 1999 (age 26)	Right-handed	Right-arm medium	

=== Notable players ===
Players who have played for Auckland and played internationally are listed below, in order of first international appearance (given in brackets):

- (New Zealand) Nancy Browne (1935)
- (New Zealand) Pearl Savin (1935)
- (New Zealand) Vera Burt (1948)
- (New Zealand) Hilda Thompson (1948)
- (New Zealand) Una Wickham (1948)
- (New Zealand) Peg Batty (1949)
- (New Zealand) Grace Gooder (1949)
- (New Zealand) Rona McKenzie (1954)
- (New Zealand) Joyce Powell (1954)
- (New Zealand) Brenda Duncan (1957)
- (New Zealand) Caroline Sinton (1957)
- (New Zealand) Jos Burley (1966)
- (New Zealand) Judi Doull (1966)
- (New Zealand) Louise Clough (1969)
- (New Zealand) Lynda Prichard (1972)
- (New Zealand) Elaine White (1972)
- (New Zealand) Carol Marett (1972)
- (New Zealand) Barbara Bevege (1973)
- (New Zealand) Glenys Page (1973)
- (New Zealand) Edna Ryan (1975)
- (New Zealand) Karen Plummer (1982)
- (New Zealand) Nicki Turner (1982)
- (New Zealand) Linda Fraser (1982)
- (New Zealand) Jeanette Dunning (1984)
- (New Zealand) Shona Gilchrist (1984)
- (New Zealand) Lois Simpson (1985)
- (New Zealand) Katrina Molloy (1985)
- (New Zealand) Sue Morris (1988)
- (New Zealand) Kim McDonald (1991)
- (New Zealand) Shelley Fruin (1992)
- (New Zealand) Yvonne Kainuku (1992)
- (New Zealand) Emily Drumm (1992)
- (New Zealand) Sarah McLauchlan (1992)
- (New Zealand) Tania Woodbury (1992)
- (New Zealand) Trudy Anderson (1993)
- (Ireland) Catherine O'Neill (1993)
- (New Zealand) Clare Nicholson (1995)
- (New Zealand) Kelly Brown (1996)
- (New Zealand) Losi Harford (1997)
- (New Zealand) Kathryn Ramel (1997)
- (New Zealand) Rebecca Rolls (1997)
- (New Zealand) Helen Watson (1999)
- (New Zealand) Paula Gruber (2000)
- (New Zealand) Munokoa Tunupopo (2000)
- (New Zealand) Sara McGlashan (2002)
- (New Zealand) Amanda Green (2003)
- (New Zealand) Michelle Lynch (2003)
- (New Zealand) Natalee Scripps (2003)
- (Australia) Kate Blackwell (2004)
- (New Zealand) Ros Kember (2006)
- (New Zealand) Ingrid Cronin-Knight (2008)
- (Cricket West Indies) Stafanie Taylor (2008)
- (New Zealand) Victoria Lind (2009)
- (New Zealand) Saskia Bullen (2009)
- (New Zealand) Kelly Anderson (2011)
- (New Zealand) Katie Perkins (2012)
- (New Zealand) Maddy Green (2012)
- (New Zealand) Anna Peterson (2012)
- (New Zealand) Samantha Curtis (2014)
- (New Zealand) Holly Huddleston (2014)
- (New Zealand) Georgia Guy (2014)
- (New Zealand) Lauren Down (2018)
- (Singapore) Neisha Pratt (2018)
- (Samoa) Regina Lili'i (2019)
- (New Zealand) Brooke Halliday (2021)
- (New Zealand) Fran Jonas (2021)
- (England) Maia Bouchier (2021)
- (New Zealand) Molly Penfold (2021)
- (Ireland) Arlene Kelly (2022)
- (New Zealand) Izzy Gaze (2022)
- (New Zealand) Bella Armstrong (2023)
- (New Zealand) Breearne Illing (2025)

== Coaching staff ==
- Head coach & Talent ID Manager: Nick White
- Coach: Donovan Grobbelaar

== Honours ==
- Hallyburton Johnstone Shield:
  - Winners (20): 1939–40, 1940–41, 1946–47, 1947–48, 1948–49, 1951–52, 1954–55, 1956–57, 1957–58, 1964–65, 1965–66, 1999–00, 2000–01, 2001–02, 2002–03, 2011–12, 2014–15, 2015–16, 2017–18, 2019–20
- Women's Super Smash:
  - Winners (1): 2013–14

== See also ==
- Auckland cricket team
