= 2025–26 Hallyburton Johnstone Shield =

Domestic cricket competition

- Dates: 15 November 2025 – 21 February 2026
- Administrator: New Zealand Cricket
- Cricket format: 50 over
- Tournament format(s): Round robin and final
- Champions: Northern Districts (1st title)
- Participants: 6
- Matches: 31
- Most runs: Kate Anderson (560)
- Most wickets: Emma Black (21)

The 2025–26 Hallyburton Johnstone Shield was the 50-over women's cricket competition, the 9th season with the name Hallyburton Johnstone Shield, that was taking place in New Zealand. The tournament ran from November 2025 to February 2026, with 6 provincial teams taking part. Otago Sparks are the defending champions.

== Competition format ==
Teams play in a double round-robin in a group of six, therefore playing 10 matches overall. Matches are played using a one day format with 50 overs per side. The top two in the group advance to the final.

The group work on a points system with positions being based on the total points. Points are awarded as follows:

Win: 4 points
Tie: 2 points
Loss: 0 points.
Abandoned/No Result: 2 points.
Bonus Point: 1 point awarded for run rate in a match being 1.25x that of opponent.

== Teams and standing ==
=== Points table ===
Pos	Team	Pld	W	L	BP	Pts	NRR	Qualification
1	Northern Districts (C)	10	8	1	5	39	1.623	Advanced to the final
2	Wellington Blaze (R)	10	6	3	3	29	−0.264	Advanced to the final
3	Auckland Hearts	10	5	4	3	25	−0.462	
4	Central Hinds	10	4	5	2	20	−0.437	
5	Canterbury Magicians	10	3	7	3	15	−0.015	
6	Otago Sparks	10	2	8	2	10	−0.370	

Source: ESPNcricinfo, NZC
(C) Champions; (R) Runners-up

=== Points summary ===
Team	Group matches										Play-offs
Team	1	2	3	4	5	6	7	8	9	10	F
Auckland Hearts	4	9	9	14	14	14	14	18	23	25	
Canterbury Magicians	0	0	5	5	5	5	5	5	10	15	
Central Hinds	4	8	8	13	13	13	18	18	18	20	
Northern Districts	0	5	9	13	18	23	28	32	37	39	W
Otago Sparks	0	0	0	0	5	10	10	10	10	10	
Wellington Blaze	5	5	9	9	14	19	23	27	27	29	L

Win	Loss	Tie	No result	Eliminated

- Note: The total points at the end of each group match are listed.
- Note: Click on the points or results to see the match summary.

== Fixtures ==
Source: New Zealand Cricket

=== Round 1 ===
15 November 2025
10:30
Scorecard

Northern Districts; 133 (35.1 overs)	v	Wellington Blaze; 120/2 (28.1 overs)
Holly Topp 32 (53); Natasha Codyre 4/28 (10 overs)		Georgia Plimmer 48 (69); Lucy Boucher 1/10 (2 overs)

Wellington Blaze won by 8 wickets (DLS method)
Cobham Oval, Whangārei
Umpires: Tina Semmens and Brad Wilson

- Wellington Blaze won the toss and elected to field.
- Wellington Blaze were set a revised target of 118 runs from 37 overs due to rain.
- Points: Wellington Blaze 5, Northern Districts 0

15 November 2025
10:30
Scorecard

Canterbury Magicians; 294/5 (50 overs)	v	Central Hinds; 295/9 (49.4 overs)
Kate Anderson 171* (153); Rosemary Mair 2/41 (10 overs)		Kerry-Anne Tomlinson 70 (82); Kate Anderson 3/30 (3.4 overs)

Central Hinds won by 1 wicket
Pukekura Park, New Plymouth
Umpires: Christelle High and Scott Oliver

- Central Hinds won the toss and elected to field.
- Points: Central Hinds 4, Canterbury Magicians 0

15 November 2025
10:30
Scorecard

Auckland Hearts; 185 (42.1 overs)	v	Otago Sparks; 155/3 (34 overs)
Saffron Wilson 79 (97); Fran Jonas 3/27 (7 overs)		Brooke Halliday 52* (71); Louisa Kotkamp 2/19 (4 overs)

Auckland Hearts won by 7 wickets (DLS method)
University of Otago Oval, Dunedin
Umpires: James Blunt and Niel Louw

- Auckland Hearts won the toss and elected to field.
- The second innings was reduced to 39 overs due to rain.
- Auckland Hearts were set a revised target of 155 runs from 39 overs due to rain.
- Points: Auckland Hearts 4, Otago Sparks 0

=== Round 2 ===
16 November 2025
10:30
Scorecard

Northern Districts; 214 (49.3 overs)	v	Wellington Blaze; 78 (33.5 overs)
Tash Wakelin 62 (83); Jess Kerr 2/35 (9 overs)		Nicole Baird 17* (55); Lucy Boucher 4/21 (10 overs)

Northern Districts won by 136 runs
Cobham Oval, Whangārei
Umpires: Tina Semmens and Brad Wilson

- Northern Districts won the toss and elected to field.
- Points: Northern Districts 5, Wellington Blaze 0

16 November 2025
10:30
Scorecard

Central Hinds; 219 (47.1 overs)	v	Canterbury Magicians; 192 (46.1 overs)
Hannah Rowe 56 (84); Gabby Sullivan 3/25 (9 overs)		Izzy Sharp 38 (39); Elizabeth Cohr 4/35 (10 overs)

Central Hinds won by 27 runs
Pukekura Park, New Plymouth
Umpires: Christelle High and Scott Oliver

- Central Hinds won the toss and elected to bat.
- Points: Central Hinds 4, Canterbury Magicians 0

16 November 2025
10:30
Scorecard

Otago Sparks; 172 (45 overs)	v	Auckland Hearts; 175/1 (35.1 overs)
Polly Inglis 35 (56); Josie Penfold 3/28 (7 overs)		Prue Catton 87* (100); Emma Black 1/29 (10 overs)

Auckland Hearts won by 9 wickets
University of Otago Oval, Dunedin
Umpires: James Blunt and Niel Louw

- Auckland Hearts won the toss and elected to field.
- Points: Auckland Hearts 5, Otago Sparks 0

=== Round 3 ===
29 November 2025
10:30
Scorecard

Northern Districts; 247 (48.1 overs)	v	Otago Sparks; 200 (46.3 overs)
Caitlin Gurrey 71 (71); Poppy Jay Watkins 3/49 (9 overs)		Anna Browning 44 (65); Marama Downes 4/25 (9.3 overs)

Northern Districts won by 47 runs
Cobham Oval, Whangārei
Umpires: Jim Birchall and Brad Wilson

- Northern Districts won the toss and elected to bat.
- Points: Northern Districts 4, Otago Sparks 0

29 November 2025
10:30
Scorecard

Wellington Blaze; 240/9 (50 overs)	v	Central Hinds; 195 (48 overs)
Rebecca Burns 87 (104); Flora Devonshire 3/40 (10 overs)		Emma McLeod 30 (40); Xara Jetly 6/39 (10 overs)

Wellington Blaze won by 45 runs
Fitzherbert Park, Palmerston North
Umpires: Brendon Davis and Stu Martin

- Central Hinds won the toss and elected to field.
- Points: Wellington Blaze 4, Central Hinds 0

29 November 2025
10:30
Scorecard

Canterbury Magicians; 247/6 (50 overs)	v	Auckland Hearts; 92 (27.3 overs)
Kate Anderson 72 (95); Fran Jonas 3/45 (7 overs)		Maddy Green 22 (34); Gabby Sullivan 3/15 (6 overs)

Canterbury Magicians won by 155 runs
Rangiora Recreation Ground, Rangiora
Umpires: Regan Dalley and Alyson Shipley

- Auckland Hearts won the toss and elected to field.
- Points: Canterbury Magicians 5, Auckland Hearts 0

=== Round 4 ===
30 November 2025
10:30
Scorecard

Northern Districts; 218/9 (50 overs)	v	Otago Sparks; 199/6 (41 overs)
Caitlin Gurrey 54 (80); Emma Black 4/37 (10 overs)		Anna Browning 39 (46); Kayley Knight 3/38 (8 overs)

Northern Districts won by 2 runs (DLS method)
Cobham Oval, Whangārei
Umpires: Jim Birchall and Brad Wilson

- Otago Sparks won the toss and elected to field.
- Otago Sparks were set a revised target of 202 runs from 41 overs due to rain.
- Points: Northern Districts 4, Otago Sparks 0

30 November 2025
10:30
Scorecard

Central Hinds; 274/6 (50 overs)	v	Wellington Blaze; 97/7 (23.3 overs)
Emma McLeod 139* (145); Jess Simmons 2/48 (8 overs)		Jess Kerr 32 (36); Elizabeth Cohr 4/13 (4 overs)

Central Hinds won by 129 runs (DLS method)
Fitzherbert Park, Palmerston North
Umpires: Tyron Davis and Stu Martin

- Central Hinds won the toss and elected to bat.
- No further play was possible due to rain.
- Wellington Blaze were 129 runs behind of the DLS par score when rain interrupted the match.
- Points: Central Hinds 5, Wellington Blaze 0

30 November 2025
10:30
Scorecard

Canterbury Magicians; 157 (43 overs)	v	Auckland Hearts; 161/4 (36.1 overs)
Izzy Sharp 39 (53); Bree Illing 4/22 (10 overs)		Prue Catton 60 (68); Melissa Banks 3/31 (10 overs)

Auckland Hearts won by 6 wickets
Rangiora Recreation Ground, Rangiora
Umpires: Regan Dalley and Alyson Shipley

- Canterbury Magicians won the toss and elected to bat.
- Points: Auckland Hearts 5, Canterbury Magicians 0

=== Round 5 ===
13 December 2025
10:30
Scorecard

Auckland Hearts; 157 (39.4 overs)	v	Northern Districts; 158/5 (28.4 overs)
Bella Armstrong 65 (62); Nensi Patel 4/36 (8.4 overs)		Caitlin Gurrey 45 (57); Brooke Halliday 2/13 (1.4 overs)

Northern Districts won by 5 wickets
Eden Park Outer Oval, Auckland
Umpires: Vincent Calabro and Tina Semmens

- Northern Districts won the toss and elected to field.
- Points: Northern Districts 5, Auckland Hearts 0

13 December 2025
10:30
Scorecard

Central Hinds; 213/9 (50 overs)	v	Otago Sparks; 214/4 (35.4 overs)
Emma McLeod 62 (92); Felicity Leydon-Davis 4/45 (10 overs)		Bella James 59 (51); Elizabeth Cohr 2/33 (7 overs)

Otago Sparks won by 6 wickets
Fitzherbert Park, Palmerston North
Umpires: Scott Oliver and Craig Pryor

- Central Hinds won the toss and elected to bat.
- Points: Otago Sparks 5, Central Hinds 0

13 December 2025
10:30
Scorecard

Canterbury Magicians; 136 (36.5 overs)	v	Wellington Blaze; 138/6 (34.1 overs)
Kate Chandler 29 (51); Jess Kerr 3/18 (8.5 overs)		Jess Kerr 57 (68); Melissa Banks 3/36 (9 overs)

Wellington Blaze won by 4 wickets
Rangiora Recreation Ground, Rangiora
Umpires: Dave Henderson and Alyson Shipley

- Wellington Blaze won the toss and elected to field.
- Points: Wellington Blaze 5, Canterbury Magicians 0

=== Round 6 ===
14 December 2025
10:30
Scorecard

Northern Districts; 262/8 (50 overs)	v	Auckland Hearts; 145 (44.1 overs)
Caitlin Gurrey 99 (98); Maddy Green 2/22 (4 overs)		Brooke Halliday 30 (34); Kayley Knight 4/28 (9.1 overs)

Northern Districts won by 117 runs
Eden Park Outer Oval, Auckland
Umpires: Vincent Calabro and Tina Semmens

- Northern Districts won the toss and elected to bat.
- Points: Northern Districts 5, Auckland Hearts 0

14 December 2025
10:30
Scorecard

Otago Sparks; 316/5 (50 overs)	v	Central Hinds; 194 (40.4 overs)
Felicity Leydon-Davis 123 (132); Elizabeth Cohr 4/68 (8 overs)		Emma McLeod 72 (85); Chloe Deerness 3/50 (8 overs)

Otago Sparks won by 122 runs
Fitzherbert Park, Palmerston North
Umpires: Scott Oliver and Craig Pryor

- Otago Sparks won the toss and elected to bat.
- Points: Otago Sparks 5, Central Hinds 0

14 December 2025
10:30
Scorecard

Canterbury Magicians; 151 (32.3 overs)	v	Wellington Blaze; 154/6 (39.5 overs)
Izzy Sharp 67 (73); Jess Kerr 7/18 (8.3 overs)		Jess Kerr 41 (52); Sarah Asmussen 2/27 (10 overs)

Wellington Blaze won by 4 wickets
Rangiora Recreation Ground, Rangiora
Umpires: Dave Henderson and Alyson Shipley

- Canterbury Magicians won the toss and elected to bat.
- Jess Kerr's 7/18 is the best bowling for the Wellington Blaze in a List A match, and equals the overall best figures in the Hallyburton Johnstone Shield.
- Points: Wellington Blaze 5, Canterbury Magicians 0

=== Round 7 ===
7 February 2026
10:30
Scorecard

Central Hinds; 172 (39.5 overs)	v	Auckland Hearts; 130 (32 overs)
Georgia Atkinson 47 (62); Maddy Green 3/15 (6 overs)		Lauren Down 35 (40); Flora Devonshire 4/32 (10 overs)

Central Hinds won by 42 runs
Eden Park Outer Oval, Auckland
Umpires: Brendon Davis and Christelle High

- Auckland Hearts won the toss and elected to field.
- Points: Central Hinds 5, Auckland Hearts 0

7 February 2026
10:30
Scorecard

Wellington Blaze; 221/9 (50 overs)	v	Otago Sparks; 9/219 (50 overs)
Isla McKenzie 52* (59); Poppy Jay Watkins 4/39 (10 overs)		Felicity Robertson 80 (124); Hannah Francis 3/44 (10 overs)

Wellington Blaze won by 2 runs
Basin Reserve, Wellington
Umpires: Regan Combe and Renga Srinivasan

- Wellington Blaze won the toss and elected to bat.
- Points: Wellington Blaze 4, Otago Sparks 0

7 February 2026
10:30
Scorecard

Canterbury Magicians; 149 (45.4 overs)	v	Northern Districts; 151/7 (24.3 overs)
Izzy Sharp 30 (61); Tash Wakelin 3/20 (4.4 overs)		Jess Watkin 70* (75); Stella Cornelius 3/36 (7.3 overs)

Northern Districts won by 3 wickets
Hagley Oval, Christchurch
Umpires: Kim Cotton and Alyson Shipley

- Canterbury Magicians won the toss and elected to bat.
- Points: Northern Districts 5, Canterbury Magicians 0

=== Round 8 ===
8 February 2026
10:30
Scorecard

Auckland Hearts; 299/8 (50 overs)	v	Central Hinds; 293 (49.2 overs)
Maddy Green 109 (98); Rosemary Mair 3/27 (7 overs)		Cate Pedersen 97 (120); Maddy Green 3/45 (8.2 overs)

Auckland Hearts won by 6 runs
Eden Park Outer Oval, Auckland
Umpires: Brendon Davis and Christelle High

- Auckland Hearts won the toss and elected to bat.
- Points: Auckland Hearts 4, Central Hinds 0

8 February 2026
10:30
Scorecard

Wellington Blaze; 246/9 (50 overs)	v	Otago Sparks; 211 (42.5 overs)
Hannah Francis 92 (96); Emma Black 4/21 (10 overs)		Anna Browning 53* (70); Xara Jetly 2/33 (8 overs)

Wellington Blaze won by 35 runs
Basin Reserve, Wellington
Umpires: Regan Combe and Renga Srinivasan

- Wellington Blaze won the toss and elected to bat.
- Points: Wellington Blaze 4, Otago Sparks 0

8 February 2026
10:30
Scorecard

Northern Districts; 257 (49.2 overs)	v	Canterbury Magicians; 237/9 (50 overs)
Nensi Patel 60 (55); Sarah Asmussen 4/48 (10 overs); Libby Stead 4/48 (10 overs)		Kate Anderson 101 (113); Kayley Knight 2/41 (9 overs)

Northern Districts won by 20 runs
Hagley Oval, Christchurch
Umpires: Kim Cotton and Alyson Shipley

- Northern Districts won the toss and elected to bat.
- Points: Northern Districts 4, Canterbury Magicians 0

=== Round 9 ===
14 February 2026
10:30
Scorecard

Northern Districts; 242/6 (28 overs)	v	Central Hinds; 116 (23.3 overs)
Tash Wakelin 56 (47); Hannah Rowe 3/53 (6 overs)		Cate Pedersen 40 (39); Jess Watkin 3/25 (6 overs)

Northern Districts won by 127 runs (DLS method)
Bay Oval, Mount Maunganui
Umpires: Christelle High and Tina Semmens

- Central Hinds won the toss and elected to field.
- The match was reduced to 28 overs per side due to rain.
- Central Hinds were set a revised target of 244 runs from 28 overs due to rain.
- Points: Northern Districts 5, Central Hinds 0

14 February 2026
10:30
Scorecard

Wellington Blaze; 147 (38 overs)	v	Auckland Hearts; 151/3 (34.4 overs)
Georgia Plimmer 65 (88); Josie Penfold 6/30 (7 overs)		Lauren Down 56 (86); Amelia Kerr 1/24 (7 overs)

Auckland Hearts won by 7 wickets
Basin Reserve, Wellington
Umpires: James Blunt and Vince Calabro

- Auckland Hearts won the toss and elected to field.
- Points: Auckland Hearts 5, Wellington Blaze 0

14 February 2026
10:30
Scorecard

Otago Sparks; 162 (39.5 overs)	v	Canterbury Magicians; 163/4 (32.2 overs)
Isy Parry 30 (38); Libby Stead 4/30 (10 overs)		Kate Anderson 84* (82); Emma Black 3/34 (9.2 overs)

Canterbury Magicians won by 6 wickets
University of Otago Oval, Dunedin
Umpires: Niel Louw and Pete Pasco

- Canterbury Magicians won the toss and elected to field.
- Points: Canterbury Magicians 5, Otago Sparks 0

=== Round 10 ===
15 February 2026
10:30
Scorecard

Northern Districts; 254/6 (50 overs)	v	Central Hinds
Caitlin Gurrey 74 (98); Ashtuti Kumar 2/53 (10 overs)

No result
Bay Oval, Mount Maunganui
Umpires: Christelle High and Tina Semmens

- Northern Districts won the toss and elected to bat.
- Rain prevented any further play.
- Points: Northern Districts 2, Central Hinds 2

15 February 2026
10:30
Scorecard

Wellington Blaze; 325/5 (50 overs)	v	Auckland Hearts; 66/1 (11.5 overs)
Amelia Kerr 128 (122); Maddy Green 2/46 (7 overs)		Izzy Gaze 30* (25); Jess Kerr 1/25 (5.5 overs)

No result
Basin Reserve, Wellington
Umpires: James Blunt and Vince Calabro

- Auckland Hearts won the toss and elected to field.
- Rain prevented any further play.
- Points: Wellington Blaze 2, Auckland Hearts 2

15 February 2026
10:30
Scorecard

Canterbury Magicians; 270/5 (50 overs)	v	Otago Sparks; 175 (35.1 overs)
Kate Anderson 93 (128); Loulsa Kotkamp 2/41 (8 overs)		Polly Inglis 45 (40); Miss Banks 3/16 (6 wovers)

Canterbury Magicians won by 95 runs
University of Otago Oval, Dunedin
Umpires: Niel Louw and Pete Pasco

- Otago Sparks won the toss and elected to field.
- Points: Canterbury Magicians 5, Otago Sparks 0

== Final ==
Final
21 February 2026
10:30
Scorecard

Northern Districts; 182 (44.4 overs)	v	Wellington Blaze; 115 (41.1 overs)
Holly Topp 39 (61); Amelia Kerr 3/49 (10 overs)		Isla McKenzie 32 (70); Marama Downes 3/26 (10 overs)

Northern Districts won by 67 runs
Basin Reserve, Wellington
Umpires: Greg Pennell and Tina Semmens

- Northern Districts won the toss and elected to bat.
