= 2024–25 Hallyburton Johnstone Shield =

Domestic cricket competition

- Dates: 16 November 2024 – 1 March 2025
- Administrator: New Zealand Cricket
- Cricket format: 50 over
- Tournament format(s): Round robin and final
- Champions: Otago Sparks (5th title)
- Participants: 6
- Matches: 31
- Most runs: Maddy Green (698)
- Most wickets: Eden Carson (22)

The 2024–25 Hallyburton Johnstone Shield was a 50-over women's cricket competition, the 8th season with the name Hallyburton Johnstone Shield, that took place in New Zealand. The tournament ran from November 2024 to February 2025, with 6 provincial teams taking part. Otago Sparks are the defending champions, claiming their fifth title after defeating Auckland Hearts in the final by 4 wickets.

The tournament ran alongside the 2024–25 Super Smash.

== Competition format ==
Teams play in a double round-robin in a group of six, therefore playing 10 matches overall. Matches are played using a one day format with 50 overs per side. The top two in the group advance to the final.

The group work on a points system with positions being based on the total points. Points are awarded as follows:

Win: 4 points
Tie: 2 points
Loss: 0 points.
Abandoned/No Result: 2 points.
Bonus Point: 1 point awarded for run rate in a match being 1.25x that of opponent.

== Points table ==
Pos	Team	Pld	W	L	Pts	NRR	Qualification
1	Otago Sparks (C)	10	9	1	45	2.068	Advanced to the final
2	Auckland Hearts (R)	10	6	4	26	−0.060	Advanced to the final
3	Central Hinds	10	5	5	24	−0.262	
4	Wellington Blaze	10	4	6	17	−0.235	
5	Canterbury Magicians	10	3	7	14	−0.793	
6	Northern Districts	10	3	7	13	−0.623	

Source: ESPNCricinfo
(C) Champions; (R) Runners-up

== Fixtures ==
Source: New Zealand Cricket

=== Round 1 ===
16 November 2024
10:30
Scorecard

Northern Districts; 247 (49.1 overs)	v	Auckland Hearts; 250/3 (44.4 overs)
Tash Wakelin 55 (58); Fran Jonas 2/40 (10 overs)		Saachi Shahri 76 (96); Eve Wolland 1/18 (4 overs)

Auckland Hearts won by 7 wickets
Bay Oval, Mount Maunganui
Umpires: Christelle High and Vinit Mahna

- Auckland Hearts won the toss and elected to field.
- Points: Auckland Hearts 4, Northern Districts 0

16 November 2024
10:30
Scorecard

Central Hinds; 141 (40.4 overs)	v	Wellington Blaze; 100 (31.5 overs)
Emma McLeod 25 (34); Jess Kerr 4/17 (9 overs)		Xara Jetly 28 (44); Ocean Bartlett 6/27 (8.5 overs)

Central Hinds won by 41 runs
Basin Reserve, Wellington
Umpires: James Birchall and Tina Semmens

- Central Hinds won the toss and elected to bat.
- The match was reduced to 43 overs per side due to rain.
- Points: Central Hinds 5, Wellington Blaze 0

16 November 2024
10:30
Scorecard

Otago Sparks; 198/6 (39 overs)	v	Canterbury Magicians; 60 (27.1 overs)
Bella James 63 (77); Frances Mackay 3/27 (8 overs)		Laura Hughes 11* (27); Louisa Kotkamp 4/17 (7 overs)

Otago Sparks won by 170 runs (DLS method)
Rangiora Recreation Ground, Rangiora
Umpires: Regan Dalley and Damian Morrow

- Canterbury Magicians won the toss and elected to field.
- Otago Sparks innings curtailed at 39 overs due to rain.
- Canterbury Magicians were set a revised target of 231 in 39 overs.
- Points: Otago Sparks 5, Canterbury Magicians 0

=== Round 2 ===
17 November 2024
10:30
Scorecard

Auckland Hearts; 194 (46.4 overs)	v	Northern Districts; 198/9 (46.3 overs)
Maddy Green 118* (124); Shriya Naidu 3/40 (10 overs)		Eve Wolland 48 (77); Molly Penfold 3/54 (10 overs)

Northern Districts won by 1 wicket
Bay Oval, Mount Maunganui
Umpires: Christelle High and Vinit Mahna

- Auckland Hearts won the toss and elected to bat.
- Points: Northern Districts 4, Auckland Hearts 0

17 November 2024
10:30
Scorecard

Wellington Blaze; 132 (33 overs)	v	Central Hinds; 107 (41.4 overs)
Jess Kerr 36 (53); Rosemary Mair 6/21 (10 overs)		Emma McLeod 41 (70); Hannah Francis 4/16 (9.4 overs)

Wellington Blaze won by 25 runs
Basin Reserve, Wellington
Umpires: James Birchall and Tina Semmens

- Wellington Blaze won the toss and elected to bat.
- Points: Wellington Blaze 4, Central Hinds 0

17 November 2024
10:30
Scorecard

Otago Sparks; 247/7 (50 overs)	v	Canterbury Magicians; 133 (43.5 overs)
Felicity Leydon-Davis 43 (68); Frances Mackay 2/37 (10 overs)		Laura Hughes 31 (61); Eden Carson 3/23 (10 overs)

Otago Sparks won by 114 runs
Rangiora Recreation Ground, Rangiora
Umpires: Regan Dalley and Damian Morrow

- Otago Sparks won the toss and elected to bat.
- Points: Otago Sparks 5, Canterbury Magicians 0

=== Round 3 ===
30 November 2024
10:30
Scorecard

Central Hinds; 246/9 (50 overs)	v	Auckland Hearts; 247/8 (50 overs)
Thamsyn Newton 84 (102); Bree Illing 4/39 (9 overs)		Maddy Green 47 (65); Rosemary Mair 3/65 (10 overs)

Auckland Hearts won by 2 wickets
Fitzherbert Park, Palmerston North
Umpires: Christelle High and Craig Pryor

- Auckland Hearts won the toss and elected to field.
- Points: Auckland Hearts 4, Central Hinds 0

30 November 2024
10:30
Scorecard

Canterbury Magicians; 239/3 (50 overs)	v	Northern Districts; 240/4 (43.5 overs)
Kate Ebrahim 106* (153); Nensi Patel 2/25 (10 overs)		Yasmeen Kareem 79 (107); Melissa Banks 2/40 (10 overs)

Northern Districts won by 6 wickets
Rangiora Recreation Ground, Rangiora
Umpires: Regan Dalley and David James Henderson

- Northern Districts won the toss and elected to field.
- Points: Northern Districts 4, Canterbury Magicians 0

30 November 2024
10:30
Scorecard

Wellington Blaze; 186/9 (50 overs)	v	Otago Sparks; 187/2 (38.3 overs)
Rebecca Burns 44 (64); Anna Browning 4/38 (10 overs)		Bella James 101* (114); Xara Jetly 1/28 (9 overs)

Otago Sparks won by 8 wickets
University of Otago Oval, Dunedin
Umpires: Brendon Davis and Derek Walker

- Otago Sparks won the toss and elected to field.
- Points: Otago Sparks 5, Wellington Blaze 0

=== Round 4 ===
1 December 2024
10:30
Scorecard

Auckland Hearts; 304/5 (50 overs)	v	Central Hinds; 209 (41.2 overs)
Lauren Down 129 (140); Emma McLeod 2/87 (8 overs)		Flora Devonshire 55 (73); Anika Tauwhare 3/57 (8.2 overs)

Auckland Hearts won by 95 runs
Fitzherbert Park, Palmerston North
Umpires: Christelle High and Craig Pryor

- Central Hinds won the toss and elected to field.
- Points: Auckland Hearts 5, Central Hinds 0

1 December 2024
10:30
Scorecard

Northern Districts; 209 (43.5 overs)	v	Canterbury Magicians; 210/4 (39.5 overs)
Caitlin Gurrey 44 (62); Sarah Asmussen 4/53 (9.5 overs)		Kate Ebrahim 86 (103); Jess Watkin 2/42 (10 overs)

Canterbury Magicians won by 6 wickets
Rangiora Recreation Ground, Rangiora
Umpires: David James Henderson and Stu Martin

- Northern Districts won the toss and elected to bat.
- Points: Canterbury Magicians 5, Northern Districts 0

1 December 2024
10:30
Scorecard

Wellington Blaze; 190 (50 overs)	v	Otago Sparks; 193/6 (38 overs)
Hannah Francis 79 (153); Hayley Jensen 2/28 (10 overs)		Caitlin Blakely 54 (64); Xara Jetly 3/36 (10 overs)

Otago Sparks won by 4 wickets
University of Otago Oval, Dunedin
Umpires: Brendon Davis and Derek Walker

- Wellington Blaze won the toss and elected to bat.
- Points: Otago Sparks 5, Wellington Blaze 0

=== Round 5 ===
14 December 2024
10:30
Scorecard

Wellington Blaze; 232/8 (50 overs)	v	Auckland Hearts; 223/8 (50 overs)
Amelia Kerr 108 (105); Josie Penfold 2/30 (7 overs)		Maddy Green 70 (92); Jess Kerr 3/38 (10 overs)

Wellington Blaze won by 9 runs
Eden Park Outer Oval, Auckland
Umpires: John Dempsey and Tina Semmens

- Auckland Hearts won the toss and elected to field.
- Points: Wellington Blaze 4, Auckland Hearts 0

14 December 2024
10:30
Scorecard

Central Hinds; 273/8 (50 overs)	v	Canterbury Magicians; 218 (42.3 overs)
Kerry-Anne Tomlinson 100* (74); Frances Mackay 2/32 (4 overs)		Izzy Sharp 41 (43); Flora Devonshire 5/22 (5.3 overs)

Central Hinds won by 55 runs
Pukekura Park, New Plymouth
Umpires: Billy Bowden and Brad Wilson

- Canterbury Magicians won the toss and elected to field.
- Points: Central Hinds Women 5, Canterbury Magicians 0

14 December 2024
10:30
Scorecard

Northern Districts; 176/8 (43.2 overs)	v	Otago Sparks; 102/0 (22.3 overs)
Caitlin Gurrey 43 (46); Hayley Jensen 2/24 (9.2 overs)		Suzie Bates 51* (71)

Otago Sparks won by 37 runs (DLS method)
University of Otago Oval, Dunedin
Umpires: James Blunt and Kim Cotton

- Otago Sparks won the toss and elected to field.
- Northern Districts innings curtailed at 42.3 overs due to rain.
- Otago Sparks were set a revised target of 183 in 43 overs. The rain again interrupted during the Otago Sparks innings and they were set a revised target of 66 in 22.3 overs.
- Points: Otago Sparks 5, Northern Districts 0

=== Round 6 ===
15 December 2024
10:30
Scorecard

Wellington Blaze; 246/9 (50 overs)	v	Auckland Hearts; 144 (33.4 overs)
Amelia Kerr 64 (77); Bree Illing 3/32 (10 overs)		Bella Armstrong 51 (51); Xara Jetly 3/35 (6.4 overs)

Wellington Blaze won by 102 runs
Eden Park Outer Oval, Auckland
Umpires: John Dempsey and Tina Semmens

- Wellington Blaze won the toss and elected to bat.
- Points: Wellington Blaze 5, Auckland Hearts 0

15 December 2024
10:30
Scorecard

Canterbury Magicians; 170 (43.2 overs)	v	Central Hinds; 171/3 (35.2 overs)
Kate Ebrahim 25 (39); Hannah Rowe 3/19 (8.2 overs)		Emma McLeod 68 (99); Kate Ebrahim 1/17 (6 overs)

Central Hinds won by 7 wickets
Pukekura Park, New Plymouth
Umpires: Billy Bowden and Brad Wilson

- Canterbury Magicians won the toss and elected to bat.
- Points: Central Hinds 5, Canterbury Magicians 0

15 December 2024
10:30
Scorecard

Otago Sparks; 286 (47.3 overs)	v	Northern Districts; 70 (24.5 overs)
Suzie Bates 107 (108); Marama Downes 3/45 (10 overs)		Jess Watkin 17 (23); Eden Carson 5/24 (9 overs)

Otago Sparks won by 186 runs
University of Otago Oval, Dunedin
Umpires: James Blunt and Kim Cotton

- Northern Districts won the toss and elected to field.
- Points: Otago Sparks 5, Northern Districts 0

=== Round 7 ===
8 February 2025
10:30
Scorecard

Auckland Hearts; 186/9 (50 overs)	v	Otago Sparks; 189/6 (33.1 overs)
Saachi Shahri 44 (83); Hayley Jensen 4/22 (10 overs)		Suzie Bates 87* (94); Amie Hucker 2/27 (7 overs)

Otago Sparks won by 6 wickets
Eden Park Outer Oval, Auckland
Umpires: James Birchall and Greg Pennell

- Auckland Hearts won the toss and elected to bat.
- Points: Otago Sparks 5, Auckland Hearts 0

8 February 2025
10:30
Scorecard

Central Hinds; 272 (48.1 overs)	v	Northern Districts; 207 (42.1 overs)
Mikaela Greig 77 (76); Jesse Prasad 5/40 (7.1 overs)		Eve Wolland 76 (94); Hannah Rowe 4/42 (10 overs)

Central Hinds won by 65 runs
Pukekura Park, New Plymouth
Umpires: David James Henderson and Stu Martin

- Northern Districts won the toss and elected to field.
- Points: Central Hinds 5, Northern Districts 0

8 February 2025
10:30
Scorecard

Wellington Blaze; 141 (43.5 overs)	v	Canterbury Magicians; 142/2 (36.5 overs)
Hannah Francis 53 (69); Kate Ebrahim 5/27 (10 overs)		Abigale Gerken 35* (62); Hannah Francis 1/25 (5.5 overs)

Canterbury Magicians won by 8 wickets
Basin Reserve, Wellington
Umpires: Tyron Davies and Scott Oliver

- Wellington Blaze won the toss and elected to bat.
- Points: Canterbury Magicians 5, Wellington Blaze 0

=== Round 8 ===
9 February 2025
10:30
Scorecard

Auckland Hearts; 258/8 (50 overs)	v	Otago Sparks; 234 (48.2 overs)
Maddy Green 76 (87); Eden Carson 3/47 (10 overs)		Felicity Leydon-Davis 80 (108); Bree Illing 4/49 (9.2 overs)

Auckland Hearts won by 24 runs
Eden Park Outer Oval, Auckland
Umpires: James Birchall and Greg Pennell

- Auckland Hearts won the toss and elected to bat.
- Points: Auckland Hearts 4, Otago Sparks 0

9 February 2025
10:30
Scorecard

Northern Districts; 292 (49.2 overs)	v	Central Hinds; 296/5 (49.1 overs)
Caitlin Gurrey 112 (108); Hannah Rowe 3/34 (10 overs)		Flora Devonshire 73* (71); Shriya Naidu 2/70 (10 overs)

Central Hinds won by 5 wickets
Pukekura Park, New Plymouth
Umpires: David James Henderson and Stu Martin

- Northern Districts won the toss and elected to bat.
- Points: Central Hinds 4, Northern Districts 0

9 February 2025
10:30
Scorecard

Canterbury Magicians; 215/6 (50 overs)	v	Wellington Blaze; 201 (48.5 overs)
Kate Ebrahim 100* (135); Natasha Codyre 3/57 (9 overs)		Jess Kerr 44 (62); Melissa Banks 2/47 (7 overs)

Canterbury Magicians won by 14 runs
Basin Reserve, Wellington
Umpires: Tyron Davies and Scott Oliver

- Canterbury Magicians won the toss and elected to bat.
- Points: Canterbury Magicians 4, Wellington Blaze 0

=== Round 9 ===
22 February 2025
10:30
Scorecard

Northern Districts; 304/6 (50 overs)	v	Wellington Blaze; 255 (49.1 overs)
Caitlin Gurrey 152 (141); Jess Kerr 2/45 (10 overs)		Hannah Francis 115 (131); Tash Wakelin 3/50 (10 overs)

Northern Districts won by 49 runs
Seddon Park, Hamilton
Umpires: Regan Dalley and Christelle High

- Northern Districts won the toss and elected to bat.
- Points: Northern Districts 5, Wellington Blaze 0

22 February 2025
10:30
Scorecard

Auckland Hearts; 269/7 (50 overs)	v	Canterbury Magicians; 262/7 (50 overs)
Maddy Green 125 (120); Melissa Banks 2/57 (10 overs)		Kate Anderson 118 (130); Fran Jonas 2/38 (10 overs)

Auckland Hearts won by 7 runs
Hagley Oval, Christchurch
Umpires: Kim Cotton and Alyson Shipley

- Canterbury Magicians won the toss and elected to field.
- Points: Auckland Hearts 4, Canterbury Magicians 0

22 February 2025
10:30
Scorecard

Otago Sparks; 283/6 (50 overs)	v	Central Hinds; 154 (38 overs)
Felicity Leydon-Davis 110 (148); Hannah Rowe 2/48 (10 overs)		Kerry-Anne Tomlinson 39* (69); Chloe Deerness 3/33 (8 overs)

Otago Sparks won by 129 runs
University of Otago Oval, Dunedin
Umpires: Vincent Calabro and Kannan Jagannathan

- Otago Sparks won the toss and elected to bat.
- Points: Otago Sparks 5, Central Hinds 0

=== Round 10 ===
23 February 2025
10:30
Scorecard

Northern Districts; 246 (49.5 overs)	v	Wellington Blaze; 249/4 (48.1 overs)
Jess Watkin 61 (71); Hannah Francis 4/44 (10 overs)		Jess Kerr 104* (112); Jesse Prasad 2/50 (9 overs)

Wellington Blaze won by 6 wickets
Seddon Park, Hamilton
Umpires: Regan Dalley and Christelle High

- Northern Districts won the toss and elected to bat.
- Points: Wellington Blaze 4, Northern Districts 0

23 February 2025
10:30
Scorecard

Canterbury Magicians; 167/3 (29 overs)	v	Auckland Hearts; 169/2 (22.4 overs)
Kate Anderson 62 (66); Josie Penfold 1/18 (3 overs)		Saachi Shahri 80* (85); Kate Anderson 2/17 (4 overs)

Auckland Hearts won by 8 wickets
Hagley Oval, Christchurch
Umpires: Kim Cotton and Alyson Shipley

- Canterbury Magicians won the toss and elected to bat.
- The match was reduced to 29 overs per side due to rain.
- Points: Auckland Hearts 5, Canterbury Magicians 0

23 February 2025
10:30
Scorecard

Central Hinds; 124 (36 overs)	v	Otago Sparks; 125/7 (25.3 overs)
Kerry-Anne Tomlinson 39 (47); Poppy Jay Watkins 3/4 (2.4 overs)		Saffron Wilson 42 (47); Hannah Rowe 3/47 (10 overs)

Otago Sparks won by 3 wickets
University of Otago Oval, Dunedin
Umpires: Vincent Calabro and Kannan Jagannathan

- Central Hinds won the toss and elected to bat.
- Points: Otago Sparks 5, Central Hinds 0

== Final ==
1 March 2025
10:30
Scorecard

Auckland Hearts; 291/5 (50 overs)	v	Otago Sparks; 292/6 (50 overs)
Maddy Green 126 (123); Felicity Leydon-Davis 2/37 (10 overs)		Polly Inglis 86 (85); Brooke Halliday 3/23 (7 overs)

Otago Sparks won by 4 wickets
University of Otago Oval, Dunedin
Umpires: Kim Cotton and Kannan Jagannathan

- Auckland Hearts won the toss and elected to bat.

== Statistics ==
=== Most runs ===
Player	Team	Matches	Innings	Runs	Average	HS	100s	50s
Maddy Green	Auckland Hearts	11	11	698	69.80	126	3	3
Caitlin Gurrey	Northern Districts	10	10	523	52.30	152	2	1
Kate Ebrahim	Canterbury Magicians	10	10	411	58.71	106*	2	1
Felicity Leydon-Davis	Otago Sparks	11	10	398	44.22	110	1	3
Saachi Shahri	Auckland Hearts	9	9	375	46.87	80*	0	4

Source: ESPN Cricinfo

=== Most wickets ===
Player	Team	Overs	Wickets	Average	BBI	5w
Eden Carson	Otago Sparks	100.0	22	17.27	5/24	1
Bree Illing	Auckland Hearts	97.2	21	21.09	4/39	0
Ocean Bartlett	Central Hinds	80.0	20	19.75	6/27	1
Hannah Rowe	Central Hinds	79.2	18	16.61	4/42	0
Flora Devonshire	Central Hinds	70.2	18	17.50	5/22	1

Source: ESPN Cricinfo
