= 2021–22 Super Smash (women's cricket) =

Cricket tournament

2021–22 Women's Super Smash
- Dates: 26 November 2021 – 29 January 2022
- Administrator: New Zealand Cricket
- Cricket format: Twenty20
- Tournament format(s): Round robin and knockout finals
- Champions: Wellington Blaze (7th title)
- Participants: 6
- Matches: 32
- Most runs: Suzie Bates (504)
- Most wickets: Leigh Kasperek (20)
- Official website: Super Smash

The 2021–22 Dream11 Super Smash was the fifteenth season of the women's Super Smash Twenty20 cricket competition played in New Zealand. It took place between 26 November 2021 and 29 January 2022. Canterbury Magicians were the defending champions.

The tournament ran alongside the 2021–22 Hallyburton Johnstone Shield.

Wellington Blaze won the tournament after defeating Otago Sparks in the final, winning their 7th title.

== Competition format ==
Teams played in a double round-robin in a group of six, therefore playing 10 matches overall. Matches were played using a Twenty20 format. The top team in the group advanced straight to the final, whilst the second and third placed teams played off in an elimination final.

The group worked on a points system with positions being based on the total points. Points were awarded as follows:

Win: 4 points
Tie: 2 points
Loss: 0 points.
Abandoned/No Result: 2 points.

== Points table ==
Pos	Team	Pld	W	L	T	NR	Pts	NRR
1	Wellington Blaze (Q)	10	10	0	0	0	40	2.673
2	Otago Sparks (Q)	10	8	2	0	0	32	0.595
3	Auckland Hearts (Q)	10	5	5	0	0	20	−0.461
4	Canterbury Magicians	10	4	6	0	0	16	−0.326
5	Central Hinds	10	2	8	0	0	8	−0.682
6	Northern Brave	10	1	9	0	0	4	−1.613

Source: Dream11 Super Smash, ESPNCricinfo

advances to Grand Final
advances to Elimination Final

== Fixtures ==
=== Round-robin ===
26 November 2021
Scorecard

Wellington Blaze; 145/6 (20 overs)	v	Canterbury Magicians; 101 (19 overs)
Amelia Kerr 71 (55); Frances Mackay 3/23 (4 overs)		Frances Mackay 41* (45); Amelia Kerr 4/12 (4 overs)

Wellington Blaze won by 44 runs
Hagley Oval, Christchurch
Umpires: Kim Cotton and Tim Parlane

- Canterbury Magicians won the toss and elected to field.
- Points: Wellington Blaze 4, Canterbury Magicians 0.

28 November 2021
Scorecard

Otago Sparks; 134/6 (20 overs)	v	Central Hinds; 126 (20 overs)
Suzie Bates 64 (52); Jess Watkin 2/22 (4 overs)		Georgia Atkinson 37 (24); Hayley Jensen 4/20 (4 overs)

Otago Sparks won by 8 runs
University of Otago Oval, Dunedin
Umpires: Shaun Haig and Kannan Jagannathan

- Central Hinds won the toss and elected to field.
- Points: Otago Sparks 4, Central Hinds 0.

3 December 2021
Scorecard

Otago Sparks; 154/5 (20 overs)	v	Northern Brave; 93/8 (20 overs)
Suzie Bates 76* (59); Nensi Patel 1/17 (4 overs)		Lucy Boucher 22 (23); Emma Black 2/15 (4 overs)

Otago Sparks won by 61 runs
Seddon Park, Hamilton
Umpires: Chris Brown and Damien Morrow

- Northern Brave won the toss and elected to field.
- Points: Otago Sparks 4, Northern Brave 0.

5 December 2021
Scorecard

Wellington Blaze; 144/4 (20 overs)	v	Central Hinds; 79 (18 overs)
Amelia Kerr 62 (49); Rosemary Mair 1/19 (4 overs)		Natalie Dodd 24 (34); Maneka Singh 3/13 (4 overs)

Wellington Blaze won by 65 runs
Basin Reserve, Wellington
Umpires: Tyron Davies and Shaun Haig

- Wellington Blaze won the toss and elected to bat.
- Points: Wellington Blaze 4, Central Hinds 0.

10 December 2021
Scorecard

Central Hinds; 137/7 (20 overs)	v	Canterbury Magicians; 141/4 (19.5 overs)
Natalie Dodd 52 (40); Sarah Asmussen 2/19 (4 overs)		Natalie Cox 63* (53); Claudia Green 2/9 (4 overs)

Canterbury Magicians won by 6 wickets
Hagley Oval, Christchurch
Umpires: Chris Brown and Pete Pasco

- Central Hinds won the toss and elected to bat.
- Points: Canterbury Magicians 4, Central Hinds 0.

12 December 2021
Scorecard

Northern Brave; 135/4 (20 overs)	v	Otago Sparks; 139/6 (19.4 overs)
Kate Anderson 52 (49); Eden Carson 1/21 (4 overs)		Kate Ebrahim 38* (32); Nensi Patel 3/13 (4 overs)

Otago Sparks won by 4 wickets
University of Otago Oval, Dunedin
Umpires: Cory Black and Derek Walker

- Otago Sparks won the toss and elected to field.
- Points: Otago Sparks 4, Northern Brave 0.

17 December 2021
Scorecard

Auckland Hearts; 142/5 (20 overs)	v	Northern Brave; 94/7 (20 overs)
Holly Huddleston 54 (34); Lauren Heaps 1/16 (3 overs)		Nensi Patel 32 (38); Arlene Kelly 3/21 (4 overs)

Auckland Hearts won by 48 runs
Seddon Park, Hamilton
Umpires: John Dempsey and Lui Els

- Auckland Hearts won the toss and elected to bat.
- Points: Auckland Hearts 4, Northern Brave 0.

18 December 2021
Scorecard

Central Hinds; 75 (18.1 overs)	v	Otago Sparks; 79/3 (14 overs)
Mikaela Greig 23 (25); Kate Ebrahim 3/13 (3 overs)		Polly Inglis 27 (34); Ocean Bartlett 1/12 (2 overs)

Otago Sparks won by 7 wickets
McLean Park, Napier
Umpires: Billy Bowden and Wayne Knights

- Central Hinds won the toss and elected to bat.
- Points: Otago Sparks 4, Central Hinds 0.

19 December 2021
Scorecard

Wellington Blaze; 142/4 (20 overs)	v	Canterbury Magicians; 97/7 (20 overs)
Amelia Kerr 50 (41); Frances Mackay 1/23 (4 overs); Sarah Asmussen 1/23 (4 overs)		Frances Mackay 55* (47); Leigh Kasperek 3/21 (4 overs)

Wellington Blaze won by 45 runs
Basin Reserve, Wellington
Umpires: Shaun Haig and Eugene Sanders

- Wellington Blaze won the toss and elected to bat.
- Points: Wellington Blaze 4, Canterbury Magicians 0.

20 December 2021 (Note: Originally the match was scheduled to be played on 27 November 2021.)
Scorecard

Northern Brave; 103/8 (20 overs)	v	Auckland Hearts; 105/6 (18.1 overs)
Caitlin Gurrey 34 (35); Anna Peterson 3/14 (4 overs)		Katie Perkins 29 (29); Brooke Halliday 2/14 (3 overs)

Auckland Hearts won by 4 wickets
Eden Park Outer Oval, Auckland
Umpires: Billy Bowden and Wayne Knights

- Northern Brave won the toss and elected to bat.
- Points: Auckland Hearts 4, Northern Brave 0.

23 December 2021
Scorecard

Canterbury Magicians; 142/6 (20 overs)	v	Northern Brave; 126/8 (20 overs)
Frances Mackay 43 (47); Kate Anderson 1/10 (2 overs)		Kate Anderson 49 (42); Jacinta Savage 2/25 (4 overs)

Canterbury Magicians won by 16 runs
Bay Oval, Mount Maunganui
Umpires: Christelle High and Wayne Knights

- Canterbury Magicians won the toss and elected to bat.
- Points: Canterbury Magicians 4, Northern Brave 0.

24 December 2021
Scorecard

Wellington Blaze; 143/5 (20 overs)	v	Auckland Hearts; 103/8 (20 overs)
Rebecca Burns 42 (31); Holly Huddleston 2/23 (3 overs)		Bella Armstrong 31 (46); Jess Kerr 4/13 (4 overs)

Wellington Blaze won by 40 runs
Basin Reserve, Wellington
Umpires: Tyron Davies and John Dempsey

- Wellington Blaze won the toss and elected to bat.
- Points: Wellington Blaze 4, Auckland Hearts 0.

26 December 2021
Scorecard

Otago Sparks; 136/5 (20 overs)	v	Canterbury Magicians; 124 (19.4 overs)
Suzie Bates 47 (48); Melissa Banks 3/22 (4 overs)		Natalie Cox 37 (36); Eden Carson 3/17 (4 overs)

Otago Sparks won by 12 runs
Hagley Oval, Christchurch
Umpires: Kim Cotton and Tim Parlane

- Otago Sparks won the toss and elected to bat.
- Points: Otago Sparks 4, Canterbury Magicians 0.

27 December 2021
Scorecard

Central Hinds; 127/5 (20 overs)	v	Auckland Hearts; 113/6 (20 overs)
Natalie Dodd 57 (55); Arlene Kelly 1/18 (4 overs)		Katie Perkins 33 (34); Claudia Green 2/13 (4 overs)

Central Hinds won by 14 runs
Fitzherbert Park, Palmerston North
Umpires: Billy Bowden and Chris Brown

- Central Hinds won the toss and elected to bat.
- Points: Central Hinds 4, Auckland Hearts 0.

28 December 2021
Scorecard

Wellington Blaze; 157/7 (20 overs)	v	Otago Sparks; 91 (18.1 overs)
Amelia Kerr 56 (50); Kate Ebrahim 2/34 (4 overs)		Katey Martin 40 (34); Jess Kerr 2/16 (3 overs)

Wellington Blaze won by 66 runs
Queenstown Events Centre, Queenstown
Umpires: Shaun Haig and Derek Walker

- Wellington Blaze won the toss and elected to bat.
- Points: Wellington Blaze 4, Otago Sparks 0.

29 December 2021
Scorecard

Otago Sparks; 153/2 (20 overs)	v	Auckland Hearts; 108 (20 overs)
Suzie Bates 89* (61); Fran Jonas 1/21 (4 overs)		Katie Perkins 29 (32); Eden Carson 4/12 (4 overs)

Otago Sparks won by 45 runs
Queenstown Events Centre, Queenstown
Umpires: Shaun Haig and Pete Pasco

- Otago Sparks won the toss and elected to bat.
- Points: Otago Sparks 4, Auckland Hearts 0.

30 December 2021
Scorecard

Northern Brave; 123/8 (20 overs)	v	Central Hinds; 120/9 (20 overs)
Caitlin Gurrey 44 (32); Monique Rees 3/12 (3 overs)		Rosemary Mair 26 (32); Shriya Naidu 2/14 (4 overs)

Northern Brave won by 3 runs
Pukekura Park, New Plymouth
Umpires: Billy Bowden and Glen Walklin

- Northern Brave won the toss and elected to bat.
- Points: Northern Brave 4, Central Hinds 0.

31 December 2021
Scorecard

Central Hinds; 112/7 (20 overs)	v	Canterbury Magicians; 114/5 (18.3 overs)
Hannah Rowe 39* (38); Melissa Banks 2/25 (3 overs)		Lea Tahuhu 29* (10); Monique Rees 1/17 (3 overs)

Canterbury Magicians won by 5 wickets
Pukekura Park, New Plymouth
Umpires: Eugene Sanders and John Bromley

- Canterbury Magicians won the toss and elected to field.
- Points: Canterbury Magicians 4, Central Hinds 0.

6 January 2022
Scorecard

Wellington Blaze; 108/8 (12 overs)	v	Otago Sparks; 75 (12 overs)
Rebecca Burns 30 (15); Kate Ebrahim 2/15 (2 overs)		Kate Ebrahim 29 (21); Xara Jetly 2/9 (2 overs)

Wellington Blaze won by 33 runs
Basin Reserve, Wellington
Umpires: Derek Walker and Glen Walklin

- Wellington Blaze won the toss and elected to bat.
- Match reduced to 12 overs per side due to rain.
- Points: Wellington Blaze 4, Otago Sparks 0.

7 January 2022
Scorecard

Auckland Hearts; 135/4 (20 overs)	v	Canterbury Magicians; 134//5 (20 overs)
Lauren Down 66* (59); Lea Tahuhu 2/13 (4 overs)		Amy Satterthwaite 71 (59); Molly Penfold 2/29 (4 overs)

Auckland Hearts won by 1 run
Eden Park Outer Oval, Auckland
Umpires: Allen Stanley and John Dempsey

- Auckland Hearts won the toss and elected to bat.
- Points: Auckland Hearts 4, Canterbury Magicians 0.

8 January 2022
Scorecard

Central Hinds; 123/6 (20 overs)	v	Wellington Blaze; 127/5 (19.1 overs)
Jess Watkin 70 (45); Jess Kerr 4/18 (4 overs)		Maddy Green 28 (27); Rosemary Mair 2/16 (4 overs)

Wellington Blaze won by 5 wickets
Pukekura Park, New Plymouth
Umpires: Billy Bowden and Tim Shirriffs

- Central Hinds won the toss and elected to bat.
- Points: Wellington Blaze 4, Central Hinds 0.

14 January 2022
Scorecard

Northern Brave; 110/7 (20 overs)	v	Central Hinds; 113/6 (19.4 overs)
Caitlin Gurrey 58* (50); Rosemary Mair 3/22 (4 overs)		Emily Cunningham 28 (29); Nensi Patel 2/20 (4 overs)

Central Hinds won by 4 wickets
Bay Oval, Mount Maunganui
Umpires: Derek Walker and Lui Els

- Northern Brave won the toss and elected to bat.
- Points: Central Hinds 4, Northern Brave 0.

15 January 2022
Scorecard

Auckland Hearts; 106/6 (20 overs)	v	Otago Sparks; 107/0 (16.1 overs)
Lauren Down 49 (40); Hayley Jensen 3/21 (4 overs)		Polly Inglis 61* (58)

Otago Sparks won by 10 wickets
Eden Park Outer Oval, Auckland
Umpires: John Dempsey and John Bromley

- Auckland Hearts won the toss and chose to bat.
- Points: Otago Sparks 4, Auckland Hearts 0.

16 January 2022
Scorecard

Northern Brave; 46 (16 overs)	v	Wellington Blaze; 51/2 (6.2 overs)
Sam Barriball 22 (36); Xara Jetly 4/1 (3 overs)		Sophie Devine 20* (14); Emma Baker 2/17 (2.2 overs)

Wellington Blaze won by 8 wickets
Cobham Oval, Whangārei
Umpires: Billy Bowden and Raoul Allen

- Northern Brave won the toss and elected to bat.
- Points: Wellington Blaze 4, Northern Brave 0.

18 January 2022 (Note: Originally the match was scheduled to be played on 4 December 2021.)
Scorecard

Auckland Hearts; 131/9 (20 overs)	v	Canterbury Magicians; 123/6 (20 overs)
Katie Perkins 29 (37); Amy Satterthwaite 2/18 (3 overs)		Natalie Cox 34 (38); Arlene Kelly 2/13 (4 overs)

Auckland Hearts won by 8 runs
Hagley Oval, Christchurch
Umpires: Eugene Sanders and Wayne Knights

- Canterbury Magicians won the toss and elected to field.
- Points: Auckland Hearts 4, Canterbury Magicians 0.

20 January 2022 (Note: Originally the match was scheduled to be played on 11 December 2021.)
Scorecard

Auckland Hearts; 89 (19.4 overs)	v	Wellington Blaze; 90/5 (13.2 overs)
Saachi Shahri 34 (39); Sophie Devine 3/24 (3.4 overs)		Maddy Green 39* (32); Arlene Kelly 2/17 (4 overs)

Wellington Blaze won by 5 wickets
Eden Park, Auckland
Umpires: Cory Black and John Bromley

- Wellington Blaze won the toss and elected to field.
- Points: Wellington Blaze 4, Auckland Hearts 0.

21 January 2022
Scorecard

Canterbury Magicians; 172/4 (20 overs)	v	Northern Brave; 148/8 (20 overs)
Amy Satterthwaite 114 (66); Lauren Heaps 1/19 (2 overs)		Samantha Barriball 31 (16); Melissa Banks 4/29 (4 overs)

Canterbury Magicians won by 24 runs
Hagley Oval, Christchurch
Umpires: Pete Pasco and Tim Parlane

- Northern Brave won the toss and elected to field.
- Points: Canterbury Magicians 4, Northern Brave 0.

22 January 2022
Scorecard

Central Hinds; 135/3 (20 overs)	v	Auckland Hearts; 136/2 (18.3 overs)
Kerry-Anne Tomlinson 40 (44); Bella Armstrong 2/24 (3 overs)		Katie Perkins 67 (54); Rosemary Mair 1/20 (3.3 overs)

Auckland Hearts won by 8 wickets
Eden Park Outer Oval, Auckland
Umpires: Allen Stanley and Wayne Knights

- Central Hinds won the toss and elected to bat.
- Points: Auckland Hearts 4, Central Hinds 0.

23 January 2022
Scorecard

Canterbury Magicians; 111/8 (20 overs)	v	Otago Sparks; 115/3 (18.5 overs)
Lea Tahuhu 31 (15); Hayley Jensen 2/15 (4 overs)		Suzie Bates 55 (49); Jacinta Savage 1/9 (1 over)

Otago Sparks won by 7 wickets
University of Otago Oval, Dunedin
Umpires: N Louw and Shaun Haig

- Canterbury Magicians won the toss and elected to bat.
- Points: Otago Sparks 4, Canterbury Magicians 0.

24 January 2022
Scorecard

Wellington Blaze; 154/9 (20 overs)	v	Northern Brave; 100 (19.2 overs)
Thamsyn Newton 38 (23); Eimear Richardson 3/27 (4 overs)		Kate Anderson 37 (42); Leigh Kasperek 2/6 (3.2 overs)

Wellington Blaze won by 54 runs
Basin Reserve, Wellington
Umpires: Tim Parlane and Tyron Davies

- Northern Brave won the toss and elected to field.
- Points: Wellington Blaze 4, Northern Brave 0.

=== Finals ===
Elimination Final
27 January 2022
Scorecard

Otago Sparks; 143/5 (20 overs)	v	Auckland Hearts; 114/6 (20 overs)
Suzie Bates 75 (62); Molly Penfold 2/27 (4 overs)		Arlene Kelly 28* (21); Sophie Oldershaw 2/17 (4 overs)

Otago Sparks won by 29 runs
University of Otago Oval, Dunedin
Umpires: Billy Bowden and Shaun Haig

- Otago Sparks won the toss and elected to bat.

Final
29 January 2022
Scorecard

Wellington Blaze; 175/4 (20 overs)	v	Otago Sparks; 100 (17.3 overs)
Sophie Devine 92 (62); Emma Black 2/36 (4 overs)		Emma Black 16 (9); Leigh Kasperek 3/23 (3 overs)

Wellington Blaze won by 75 runs
Seddon Park, Hamilton
Umpires: Chris Brown and Wayne Knights

- Wellington Blaze won the toss and elected to bat.

== Statistics ==
=== Most runs ===
Player	Team	Matches	Innings	Runs	Average	HS	100s	50s
Suzie Bates	Otago Sparks	12	12	504	56.00	89*	0	5
Amelia Kerr	Wellington Blaze	11	10	346	34.60	71	0	4
Amy Satterthwaite	Canterbury Magicians	10	10	313	31.30	114	1	1
Katie Perkins	Auckland Hearts	11	11	253	23.00	67	0	1
Frances Mackay	Canterbury Magicians	10	10	242	30.25	55*	0	1

Source: ESPN Cricinfo

=== Most wickets ===
Player	Team	Overs	Wickets	Average	BBI	5w
Leigh Kasperek	Wellington Blaze	37.3	20	9.35	3/21	0
Jess Kerr	Wellington Blaze	32.0	18	8.44	4/13	0
Amelia Kerr	Wellington Blaze	42.0	17	11.29	4/12	0
Eden Carson	Otago Sparks	46.0	17	15.82	4/12	0
Emma Black	Otago Sparks	46.0	16	19.50	2/15	0

Source: ESPN Cricinfo
