= 2020–21 Super Smash (women's cricket) =

- Dates: 24 December 2020 – 13 February 2021
- Administrator(s): New Zealand Cricket
- Cricket format: Twenty20
- Tournament format(s): Round robin and knockout finals
- Champions: Canterbury Magicians (5th title)
- Participants: 6
- Matches: 32
- Most runs: Sophie Devine (434)
- Most wickets: Frances Mackay (20)

The 2020–21 Dream11 Super Smash was the fourteenth season of the women's Super Smash Twenty20 cricket competition played in New Zealand. It ran from December 2020 to February 2021, with 6 provincial teams taking part. Canterbury Magicians beat Wellington Blaze in the final to win the tournament, their 5th Super Smash title.

The tournament ran alongside the 2020–21 Hallyburton Johnstone Shield.

== Competition format ==
Teams played in a double round-robin in a group of six, therefore playing 10 matches overall. Matches were played using a Twenty20 format. The top team in the group advanced straight to the final, whilst the second and third placed teams played off in an elimination final.

The group worked on a points system with positions being based on the total points. Points were awarded as follows:

Win: 4 points
Tie: 2 points
Loss: 0 points.
Abandoned/No Result: 2 points.

== Points table ==
Pos	Team	Pld	W	L	T	NR	Pts	NRR
1	Canterbury Magicians	10	7	2	0	1	30	0.781
2	Auckland Hearts	10	7	2	0	1	30	0.275
3	Wellington Blaze	10	7	3	0	0	28	2.196
4	Northern Spirit	10	3	7	0	0	12	−0.865
5	Otago Sparks	10	3	7	0	0	12	−1.310
6	Central Hinds	10	2	8	0	0	8	−1.168

Source: ESPNCricinfo

== Fixtures ==
=== Round-robin ===
24 December 2020
Scorecard

Auckland Hearts; 92/9 (20 overs)	v	Wellington Blaze; 94/1 (10.4 overs)
Saachi Shahri 29 (27); Amelia Kerr 3/11 (4 overs)		Amelia Kerr 58* (34); Anna Peterson 1/17 (2 overs)

Wellington Blaze won by 9 wickets
Basin Reserve, Wellington
Umpires: Allen Stanley and Billy Bowden

- Wellington Blaze won the toss and elected to field.

27 December 2020
Scorecard

Central Hinds; 88/9 (20 overs)	v	Wellington Blaze; 89/1 (13.1 overs)
Natalie Dodd 20 (27); Thamsyn Newton 3/23 (4 overs)		Rebecca Burns 42 (42); Melissa Hansen 1/7 (1 over)

Wellington Blaze won by 9 wickets
McLean Park, Napier
Umpires: Garth Stirrat and Glen Walklin

- Wellington Blaze won the toss and elected to field.

28 December 2020
Scorecard

Auckland Hearts; 156/3 (20 overs)	v	Otago Sparks; 119 (19.5 overs)
Anna Peterson 68 (51); Gemma Adams 1/16 (4 overs)		Polly Inglis 62 (61); Arlene Kelly 3/26 (3.5 overs)

Auckland Hearts won by 37 runs
Molyneux Park, Alexandra
Umpires: John Bromley and Pete Pasco

- Otago Sparks won the toss and elected to field.

29 December 2020
Scorecard

Otago Sparks; 112 (20 overs)	v	Canterbury Magicians; 113/2 (15.3 overs)
Bella James 24 (19); Lea Tahuhu 3/11 (4 overs)		Amy Satterthwaite 56* (40); Sophie Oldershaw 1/21 (3 overs)

Canterbury Magicians won by 8 wickets
Molyneux Park, Alexandra
Umpires: John Bromley and Pete Pasco

- Otago Sparks won the toss and elected to bat.

30 December 2020
Scorecard

Northern Spirit; 161/6 (20 overs)	v	Central Districts; 144/9 (20 overs)
Caitlin Gurrey 57 (40); Jess Watkin 2/17 (3 overs)		Natalie Dodd 49 (40); Eimear Richardson 3/27 (4 overs)

Northern Spirit won by 17 runs
Pukekura Park, New Plymouth
Umpires: Allen Stanley and Ashley Mehrotra

- Central Hinds won the toss and elected to field.

31 December 2020
Scorecard

Auckland Hearts; 158/2 (20 overs)	v	Central Districts; 150/8 (20 overs)
Lauren Down 63* (64); Jess Watkin 2/27 (4 overs)		Hannah Rowe 44 (46); Arlene Kelly 4/28 (4 overs)

Auckland Hearts won by 8 runs
Pukekura Park, New Plymouth
Umpires: Allen Stanley and Kim Cotton

- Auckland Hearts won the toss and elected to bat.

1 January 2021
Scorecard

Wellington Blaze; 139/7 (20 overs)	v	Northern Spirit; 140/5 (20 overs)
Amelia Kerr 60 (43); Felicity Leydon-Davis 2/23 (3 overs)		Kate Anderson 50 (47); Leigh Kasperek 1/20 (2 overs)

Northern Spirit won by 5 wickets
Bay Oval, Mount Maunganui
Umpires: Damian Morrow and Lui Els

- Wellington Blaze won the toss and elected to bat.

2 January 2021
Scorecard

Northern Spirit; 97/4 (13 overs)	v	Otago Sparks; 103/4 (12.2 overs)
Brooke Halliday 37 (31); Emma Black 1/9 (1 over)		Caitlin Blakely 32* (24); Brooke Halliday 1/14 (2 overs)

Otago Sparks won by 6 wickets (DLS)
Bay Oval, Mount Maunganui
Umpires: Garth Stirrat and Lui Els

- Otago Sparks won the toss and elected to field.
- Northern Spirit were set a revised target of 102 runs from 13 overs due to rain.

3 January 2021
Scorecard

Canterbury Magicians; 6/0 (1.4 overs)	v	Auckland Hearts
Frances Mackay 5* (5)

No result
Eden Park Outer Oval, Auckland
Umpires: Allen Stanley and John Bromley

- Auckland Hearts won the toss and elected to field.

4 January 2021
Scorecard

Central Hinds; 68/2 (10 overs)	v	Northern Spirit; 72/1 (9.5 overs)
Natalie Dodd 38* (30); Lauren Heaps 1/9 (2 overs)		Brooke Halliday 27* (30); Mikaela Greig 1/16 (2 overs)

Northern Spirit won by 9 wickets
Seddon Park, Hamilton
Umpires: John Dempsey and Lui Els

- Northern Spirit won the toss and elected to field.
- Match reduced to 10 overs per side due to rain.

8 January 2021
Scorecard

Central Hinds; 102/7 (20 overs)	v	Otago Sparks; 105/3 (15.2 overs)
Natalie Dodd 26 (41); Hayley Jensen 2/22 (4 overs)		Polly Inglis 43* (38); Monique Rees 1/13 (2 overs)

Otago Sparks won by 7 wickets
University Oval, Dunedin
Umpires: Derek Walker and Pete Pasco

- Otago Sparks won the toss and elected to field.

9 January 2021
Scorecard

Northern Spirit; 100/8 (20 overs)	v	Wellington Blaze; 102/5 (17 overs)
Eimear Richardson 30 (38); Leigh Kasperek 4/16 (4 overs)		Rebecca Burns 24 (15); Lucy Boucher 3/21 (3 overs)

Wellington Blaze won by 5 wickets
Basin Reserve, Wellington
Umpires: Tim Parlane and Tyron Davies

- Northern Spirit won the toss and elected to bat.

10 January 2021
Scorecard

Central Hinds; 100/9 (20 overs)	v	Canterbury Magicians; 101/2 (17 overs)
Kate Gaging 28 (27); Frances Mackay 4/10 (4 overs)		Frances Mackay 48 (33); Claudia Green 1/26 (4 overs)

Canterbury Magicians won by 8 wickets
Hagley Oval, Christchurch
Umpires: Glen Walklin and John Dempsey

- Canterbury Magicians won the toss and elected to field.

11 January 2021
Scorecard

Auckland Hearts; 138/4 (20 overs)	v	Canterbury Magicians; 118 (19.2 overs)
Bella Armstrong 39 (29); Frances Mackay 1/19 (4 overs)		Amy Satterthwaite 32 (33); Holly Huddleston 3/8 (3.2 overs)

Auckland Hearts won by 20 runs
Hagley Oval, Christchurch
Umpires: Kim Cotton and Lui Els

- Canterbury Magicians won the toss and elected to field.

14 January 2021
Scorecard

Otago Sparks; 128/7 (20 overs)	v	Wellington Blaze; 131/0 (8.4 overs)
Hayley Jensen 35 (26); Jess Kerr 2/15 (4 overs)		Sophie Devine 108* (38)

Wellington Blaze won by 10 wickets
University Oval, Dunedin
Umpires: Chris Brown and Kannan Jagannathan

- Otago Sparks won the toss and elected to bat.

15 January 2021
Scorecard

Canterbury Magicians; 154/4 (20 overs)	v	Northern Spirit; 101 (19.5 overs)
Kate Ebrahim 84* (65); Eimear Richardson 1/14 (4 overs)		Kate Anderson 38 (31); Sarah Asmussen 2/21 (4 overs)

Canterbury Magicians won by 53 runs
Hagley Oval, Christchurch
Umpires: Damian Morrow and Tim Parlane

- Canterbury Magicians won the toss and elected to bat.

16 January 2021
Scorecard

Canterbury Magicians; 117 (19.3 overs)	v	Wellington Blaze; 118/3 (13.2 overs)
Amy Satterthwaite 52 (28); Maddy Green 4/9 (2.3 overs)		Sophie Devine 59 (26); Sarah Asmussen 2/28 (4 overs)

Wellington Blaze won by 7 wickets
Hagley Oval, Christchurch
Umpires: Ashley Mehrotra and John Bromley

- Canterbury Magicians won the toss and elected to bat.

17 January 2021
Scorecard

Northern Spirit; 97/9 (20 overs)	v	Auckland Hearts; 100/4 (17.4 overs)
Caitlin Gurrey 28 (36); Holly Huddleston 3/14 (4 overs)		Katie Perkins 52* (48); Nensi Patel 3/19 (4 overs)

Auckland Hearts won by 6 wickets
Eden Park Outer Oval, Auckland
Umpires: Allen Stanley and Chris Brown

- Northern Spirit won the toss and elected to bat.

18 January 2021
Scorecard

Central Hinds; 126/3 (17 overs)	v	Otago Sparks; 59/3 (8 overs)
Anlo van Deventer 63* (40); Hayley Jensen 1/22 (4 overs)		Katey Martin 33* (24); Jess Watkin 1/14 (2 overs)

Central Hinds won by 6 runs (DLS)
Pukekura Park, New Plymouth
Umpires: Eugene Sanders and TS Shirriffs

- Otago Sparks won the toss and elected to field.
- Otago Sparks were set a revised target of 66 runs from 8 overs due to rain.

21 January 2021
Scorecard

Northern Spirit; 124/5 (19 overs)	v	Canterbury Magicians; 129/4 (16.3 overs)
Brooke Halliday 35 (35); Frances Mackay 4/17 (4 overs)		Amy Satterthwaite 38 (27); Makayla Templeton 2/15 (3.3 overs)

Canterbury Magicians won by 6 wickets (DLS)
Seddon Park, Hamilton
Umpires: John Dempsey and Lui Els

- Canterbury Magicians won the toss and elected to field.
- Match reduced to 19 overs per side due to rain.

23 January 2021
Scorecard

Auckland Hearts; 120/5 (20 overs)	v	Central Districts; 122/1 (16.3 overs)
Holly Huddleston 37* (32); Hannah Rowe 2/26 (4 overs)		Jess Watkin 68* (48); Holly Huddleston 1/27 (3 overs)

Central Hinds won by 9 wickets
Eden Park Outer Oval, Auckland
Umpires: Chris Brown and Damian Morrow

- Auckland Hearts won the toss and elected to bat.

24 January 2021
Scorecard

Wellington Blaze; 196/5 (20 overs)	v	Otago Sparks; 74 (15.3 overs)
Sophie Devine 80 (44); Sophie Oldershaw 2/24 (4 overs)		Polly Inglis 24 (25); Xara Jetly 4/9 (3 overs)

Wellington Blaze won by 122 runs
Basin Reserve, Wellington
Umpires: Cory Black and Eugene Sanders

- Wellington Blaze won the toss and elected to bat.

25 January 2021
Scorecard

Wellington Blaze; 132/9 (20 overs)	v	Canterbury Magicians; 134/1 (18.2 overs)
Leigh Kasperek 39 (32); Lea Tahuhu 2/22 (4 overs)		Amy Satterthwaite 71* (50)

Canterbury Magicians won by 9 wickets
Basin Reserve, Wellington
Umpires: Derek Walker and Tyron Davies

- Canterbury Magicians won the toss and elected to field.

29 January 2021
Scorecard

Northern Spirit; 108/7 (20 overs)	v	Auckland Hearts; 111/4 (18.1 overs)
Brooke Halliday 34 (40); Arlene Kelly 2/17 (4 overs)		Katie Perkins 45 (37); Brooke Halliday 2/22 (4 overs)

Auckland Hearts won by 6 wickets
Seddon Park, Hamilton
Umpires: Allen Stanley and John Dempsey

- Northern Spirit won the toss and elected to bat.

30 January 2021
Scorecard

Canterbury Magicians; 132/8 (20 overs)	v	Otago Sparks; 129/7 (20 overs)
Amy Satterthwaite 36 (30); Sophie Oldershaw 2/20 (4 overs)		Millie Cowan 50 (37); Frances Mackay 2/23 (4 overs)

Canterbury Magicians won by 3 runs
Hagley Oval, Christchurch
Umpires: Damian Morrow and John Bromley

- Otago Sparks won the toss and elected to field.

31 January 2021
Scorecard

Wellington Blaze; 162/5 (20 overs)	v	Central Hinds; 125/6 (20 overs)
Sophie Devine 88 (58); Georgia Atkinson 1/26 (4 overs)		Natalie Dodd 61* (55); Leigh Kasperek 1/19 (4 overs)

Wellington Blaze won by 37 runs
Basin Reserve, Wellington
Umpires: Chris Brown and Tyron Davies

- Wellington Blaze won the toss and elected to bat.

1 February 2021
Scorecard

Auckland Hearts; 123 (18.1 overs)	v	Otago Sparks; 96 (19.4 overs)
Anna Peterson 31 (26); Emma Black 4/14 (3.1 overs)		Katey Martin 44 (42); Anna Peterson 3/23 (4 overs)

Auckland Hearts won by 27 runs
Eden Park Outer Oval, Auckland
Umpires: Derek Walker and Kannan Jagannathan

- Otago Sparks won the toss and elected to field.

5 February 2021
Scorecard

Canterbury Magicians; 137/5 (20 overs)	v	Central Hinds; 107 (19.4 overs)
Frances Mackay 46 (45); Claudia Green 1/18 (4 overs)		Anlo van Deventer 29 (27); Gabby Sullivan 3/26 (3 overs)

Canterbury Magicians won by 30 runs
McLean Park, Napier
Umpires: Chris Brown and Glen Walklin

- Canterbury Magicians won the toss and elected to bat.

6 February 2021
Scorecard

Otago Sparks; 153/6 (20 overs)	v	Northern Spirit; 111/9 (20 overs)
Katey Martin 85 (56); Brooke Halliday 2/18 (2 overs)		Makayla Templeton 31 (30); Eden Carson 3/18 (4 overs)

Otago Sparks won by 42 runs
University Oval, Dunedin
Umpires: Derek Walker and Pete Pasco

- Northern Spirit won the toss and elected to field.

7 February 2021
Scorecard

Auckland Hearts; 117 (20 overs)	v	Wellington Blaze; 110 (19 overs)
Katie Perkins 29 (40); Sophie Devine 4/21 (4 overs)		Maddy Green 33 (34); Anna Peterson 2/12 (4 overs)

Auckland Hearts won by 7 runs
Eden Park Outer Oval, Auckland
Umpires: Damian Morrow and Lui Els

- Auckland Hearts won the toss and elected to bat.

=== Finals ===
Elimination Final
11 February 2021
Scorecard

Wellington Blaze; 150/6 (20 overs)	v	Auckland Hearts; 115/7 (20 overs)
Amelia Kerr 54* (44); Fran Jonas 2/23 (4 overs)		Katie Perkins 46 (57); Amelia Kerr 2/16 (4 overs)

Wellington Blaze won by 35 runs
Eden Park Outer Oval, Auckland
Umpires: Cory Black and Eugene Sanders

- Wellington Blaze won the toss and elected to bat.

Final
13 February 2021
Scorecard

Wellington Blaze; 125/8 (20 overs)	v	Canterbury Magicians; 126/6 (19.4 overs)
Sophie Devine 47 (45); Amy Satterthwaite 3/13 (4 overs)		Kate Ebrahim 45* (40); Amelia Kerr 3/19 (4 overs)

Canterbury Magicians won by 4 wickets
Basin Reserve, Wellington
Umpires: Billy Bowden and Kim Cotton

- Canterbury Magicians won the toss and elected to field.
- Amelia Kerr (Wellington Blaze) took a hat-trick.

== Statistics ==
=== Most runs ===
Player	Team	Matches	Innings	Runs	Average	HS	100s	50s
Sophie Devine	Wellington Blaze	8	8	434	62.00	108*	1	3
Amy Satterthwaite	Canterbury Magicians	11	10	364	52.00	71*	0	3
Amelia Kerr	Wellington Blaze	12	11	361	51.57	66	0	4
Natalie Dodd	Central Hinds	10	10	301	43.00	61*	0	1
Kate Ebrahim	Canterbury Magicians	11	9	292	73.00	84*	0	1

Source: ESPN Cricinfo

=== Most wickets ===
Player	Team	Overs	Wickets	Average	BBI	5w
Frances Mackay	Canterbury Magicians	39.4	20	9.55	4/10	0
Holly Huddleston	Auckland Hearts	33.4	16	12.06	3/8	0
Amelia Kerr	Wellington Blaze	44.0	14	15.21	3/11	0
Leigh Kasperek	Wellington Blaze	27.0	13	11.53	4/16	0
Arlene Kelly	Auckland Hearts	33.5	12	15.66	4/28	0

Source: ESPN Cricinfo
