= 2020–21 Hallyburton Johnstone Shield =

- Dates: 21 November 2020 – 21 March 2021
- Administrator: New Zealand Cricket
- Cricket format: 50 over
- Tournament format(s): Round robin and final
- Champions: Canterbury Magicians (39th title)
- Participants: 6
- Matches: 31
- Most runs: Kate Ebrahim (480)
- Most wickets: Sarah Asmussen (19)

The 2020–21 Hallyburton Johnstone Shield was a 50-over women's cricket competition, the fourth season with the name Hallyburton Johnstone Shield, that took place in New Zealand. It ran from November 2020 to March 2021, with 6 provincial teams taking part. Canterbury Magicians beat Auckland Hearts in the final to win the tournament.

The tournament ran alongside the 2020–21 Super Smash.

== Competition format ==
Teams played in a double round-robin in a group of six, therefore playing 10 matches overall. Matches were played using a one day format with 50 overs per side. The top two in the group advanced to the final.

The group worked on a points system with positions being based on the total points. Points were awarded as follows:

Win: 4 points
Tie: 2 points
Loss: 0 points.
Abandoned/No Result: 2 points.
Bonus Point: 1 point awarded for run rate in a match being 1.25x that of opponent.

== Points table ==
Team	Pld	W	L	T	NR	A	BP	Pts	NRR
Canterbury Magicians	10	7	3	0	0	0	5	33	0.96
Auckland Hearts	10	7	3	0	0	0	5	33	–0.12
Central Hinds	10	7	3	0	0	0	4	32	0.87
Northern Districts	10	5	5	0	0	0	4	24	0.16
Wellington Blaze	10	4	6	0	0	0	3	19	–0.17
Otago Sparks	10	0	10	0	0	0	0	0	–1.98

Source: New Zealand Cricket

Advanced to the Final

== Fixtures ==
=== Round 1 ===
21 November 2020
Scorecard

Wellington Blaze; 169/7 (43 overs)	v	Northern Districts; 172/8 (42.4 overs)
Rebecca Burns 39 (59); Charlotte Sarsfield 3/29 (9 overs)		Caitlin Gurrey 41 (59); Beth Molony 3/25 (9 overs)

Northern Districts won by 2 wickets
Basin Reserve, Wellington
Umpires: Cory Black and Garth Stirrat

- Northern Districts won the toss and elected to field.
- Match start delayed due to travel issues, reduced to 43 overs per side.
- Points: Northern Districts 4, Wellington Blaze 0

21 November 2020
Scorecard

Auckland Hearts; 49 (21.1 overs)	v	Central Hinds; 52/3 (7.4 overs)
Saachi Shahri 7 (27); Claudia Green 4/20 (8 overs)		Jess Watkin 22* (11); Jesse Prasad 2/0 (1 over)

Central Hinds won by 7 wickets
Pukekura Park, New Plymouth
Umpires: Allen Stanley and Damian Morrow

- Central Hinds won the toss and elected to field.
- Points: Central Hinds 5, Auckland Hearts 0

21 November 2020
Scorecard

Canterbury Magicians; 321/4 (50 overs)	v	Otago Sparks; 213/8 (46 overs)
Frances Mackay 142 (157); Saffron Wilson 2/49 (10 overs)		Caitlin Blakely 78 (117); Frances Mackay 2/31 (8 overs)

Canterbury Magicians won by 91 runs (DLS)
Whitestone Contracting Stadium, Oamaru
Umpires: Derek Walker and Kannan Jagannathan

- Otago Sparks won the toss and elected to field.
- Otago Sparks innings reduced to 46 overs due to rain.
- Points: Canterbury Magicians 5, Otago Sparks 0

=== Round 2 ===
22 November 2020
Scorecard

Wellington Blaze; 214/9 (50 overs)	v	Northern Districts; 215/2 (38.3 overs)
Jess McFadyen 107 (134); Eimear Richardson 3/34 (6 overs)		Brooke Halliday 101* (114); Thamsyn Newton 1/38 (8 overs)

Northern Districts won by 8 wickets
Basin Reserve, Wellington
Umpires: Cory Black and Garth Stirrat

- Northern Districts won the toss and elected to field.
- Points: Northern Districts 5, Wellington Blaze 0

22 November 2020
Scorecard

Auckland Hearts; 86 (35.3 overs)	v	Central Hinds; 91/0 (9 overs)
Skye Bowden 27 (42); Monique Rees 3/15 (4 overs)		Jess Watkin 68* (33)

Central Hinds won by 10 wickets
Pukekura Park, New Plymouth
Umpires: Allen Stanley and Damian Morrow

- Central Hinds won the toss and elected to field.
- Points: Central Hinds 5, Auckland Hearts 0

22 November 2020
Scorecard

Canterbury Magicians; 222/8 (50 overs)	v	Otago Sparks; 89 (28 overs)
Kate Ebrahim 62 (80); Emma Black 3/50 (9 overs)		Saffron Wilson 23* (43); Sarah Asmussen 4/9 (4 overs)

Canterbury Magicians won by 133 runs
Whitestone Contracting Stadium, Oamaru
Umpires: Derek Walker and Kannan Jagannathan

- Canterbury Magicians won the toss and elected to field.
- Points: Canterbury Magicians 5, Otago Sparks 0

=== Round 3 ===
5 December 2020
Scorecard

Wellington Blaze; 111 (38.4 overs)	v	Central Hinds; 112/2 (27.2 overs)
Jess McFadyen 25 (49); Jess Watkin 4/13 (8.4 overs)		Natalie Dodd 37* (86); Xara Jetly 2/41 (8 overs)

Central Hinds won by 8 wickets
Donnelly Park, Levin
Umpires: Cory Black and TS Shirriffs

- Central Hinds won the toss and elected to field.
- Points: Central Hinds 5, Wellington Blaze 0

5 December 2020
Scorecard

Canterbury Magicians; 236 (49.5 overs)	v	Northern Districts; 152 (38.1 overs)
Jacinta Savage 59 (81); Kayley Knight 2/25 (5 overs)		Eimear Richardson 35 (39); Jacinta Savage 6/18 (7.1 overs)

Canterbury Magicians won by 84 runs
Cobham Oval, Whangārei
Umpires: Allen Stanley and Lui Els

- Northern Districts won the toss and elected to field.
- Points: Canterbury Magicians 5, Northern Districts 0

5 December 2020
Scorecard

Otago Sparks; 116/5 (24 overs)	v	Auckland Hearts; 121/2 (17.4 overs)
Caitlin Blakely 44* (62); Jesse Prasad 2/12 (5 overs)		Bella Armstrong 62* (48); Emma Black 1/8 (3 overs)

Auckland Hearts won by 8 wickets
Queens Park, Invercargill
Umpires: Kannan Jagannathan and Pete Pasco
Player of the match: Match reduced to 24 overs per side due to rain.

- Auckland Hearts won the toss and elected to field.
- Points: Auckland Hearts 5, Otago Sparks 0

=== Round 4 ===
6 December 2020
Scorecard

Central Hinds; 187 (49.5 overs)	v	Wellington Blaze; 188/8 (48.5 overs)
Hannah Rowe 62 (101); Maneka Singh 2/20 (10 overs)		Jess McFadyen 63* (71); Jess Watkin 2/23 (10 overs)

Wellington Blaze won by 2 wickets
Donnelly Park, Levin
Umpires: Cory Black and TS Shirriffs

- Central Hinds won the toss and elected to bat.
- Points: Wellington Blaze 4, Central Hinds 0

6 December 2020
Scorecard

Canterbury Magicians; 249 (49.3 overs)	v	Northern Districts; 214 (46.2 overs)
Kate Ebrahim 63 (107); Brooke Halliday 3/28 (8.3 overs)		Brooke Halliday 77 (82); Sarah Asmussen 3/41 (10 overs)

Canterbury Magicians won by 35 runs
Cobham Oval, Whangārei
Umpires: Allen Stanley and Lui Els

- Canterbury Magicians won the toss and elected to bat.
- Points: Canterbury Magicians 4, Northern Districts 0

6 December 2020
Scorecard

Otago Sparks; 154 (48.5 overs)	v	Auckland Hearts; 155/7 (37.1 overs)
Polly Inglis 23 (31); Jane Barnett 4/31 (8 overs)		Regina Lili'i 45* (73); Molly Loe 2/27 (7 overs)

Auckland Hearts won by 3 wickets
Queens Park, Invercargill
Umpires: Kannan Jagannathan and Pete Pasco

- Auckland Hearts won the toss and elected to field.
- Points: Auckland Hearts 5, Otago Sparks 0

=== Round 5 ===
19 December 2020
Scorecard

Otago Sparks; 196 (49.4 overs)	v	Central Hinds; 135/1 (19 overs)
Caitlin Blakely 62 (103); Hannah Rowe 4/23 (6.4 overs)		Natalie Dodd 50* (56); Eden Carson 1/20 (3 overs)

Central Hinds won by 9 wickets (DLS)
University Oval, Dunedin
Umpires: John Bromley and Pete Pasco

- Otago Sparks won the toss and elected to bat.
- Central Hinds innings reduced to 25 overs due to rain.
- Points: Central Hinds 4, Otago Sparks 0

19 December 2020
Scorecard

Auckland Hearts; 138 (33.3 overs)	v	Northern Districts; 126 (41.1 overs)
Katie Perkins 45 (56); Lauren Heaps 4/34 (10 overs)		Brooke Halliday 34 (45); Fran Jonas 4/41 (10 overs)

Auckland Hearts won by 12 runs
Eden Park Outer Oval, Auckland
Umpires: Allen Stanley and Glen Walklin

- Northern Districts won the toss and elected to field.
- Points: Auckland Hearts 4, Northern Districts 0

19 December 2020
Scorecard

Canterbury Magicians; 155 (46.1 overs)	v	Wellington Blaze; 156/2 (32.1 overs)
Kate Ebrahim 48 (67); Kate Chandler 5/41 (9.1 overs)		Thamsyn Newton 61* (58); Gabby Sullivan 1/19 (3 overs)

Wellington Blaze won by 8 wickets
Hagley Oval, Christchurch
Umpires: Kim Cotton and Lui Els

- Wellington Blaze won the toss and elected to field.
- Points: Wellington Blaze 5, Canterbury Magicians 0

=== Round 6 ===
20 December 2020
Scorecard

Otago Sparks; 231/6 (45 overs)	v	Central Hinds; 236/6 (43.5 overs)
Katey Martin 105 (104); Jess Watkin 2/35 (6 overs)		Natalie Dodd 108* (132); Eden Carson 2/38 (8.5 overs)

Central Hinds won by 4 wickets
University Oval, Dunedin
Umpires: John Bromley and Pete Pasco

- Central Hinds won the toss and elected to field.
- Match reduced to 45 overs per side due to rain.
- Points: Central Hinds 4, Otago Sparks 0

20 December 2020
Scorecard

Auckland Hearts; 222 (49.2 overs)	v	Northern Districts; 176 (42.4 overs)
Saachi Shahri 65 (67); Brooke Halliday 4/33 (10 overs)		Kate Anderson 55 (68); Fran Jonas 3/22 (9 overs)

Auckland Hearts won by 46 runs
Eden Park Outer Oval, Auckland
Umpires: Allen Stanley and Glen Walklin

- Northern Districts won the toss and elected to field.
- Points: Auckland Hearts 5, Northern Districts 0

20 December 2020
Scorecard

Canterbury Magicians; 275/4 (50 overs)	v	Wellington Blaze; 136 (42.5 overs)
Amy Satterthwaite 81 (87); Maneka Singh 1/31 (10 overs)		Caitlin King 34 (52); Frances Mackay 3/18 (10 overs)

Canterbury Magicians won by 139 runs
Hagley Oval, Christchurch
Umpires: Kim Cotton and Lui Els

- Canterbury Magicians won the toss and elected to bat.
- Points: Canterbury Magicians 5, Wellington Blaze 0

=== Round 7 ===
20 February 2021
Scorecard

Northern Districts; 289/7 (50 overs)	v	Otago Sparks; 217 (49.2 overs)
Eimear Richardson 72 (48); Eden Carson 3/69 (10 overs)		Bella James 50 (53); Eimear Richardson 4/37 (10 overs)

Northern Districts won by 72 runs
Seddon Park, Hamilton
Umpires: Christelle High and Lui Els

- Otago Sparks won the toss and elected to field.
- Points: Northern Districts 5, Otago Sparks 0

20 February 2021
Scorecard

Auckland Hearts; 285/7 (50 overs)	v	Wellington Blaze; 175 (39.4 overs)
Lauren Down 69 (79); Maneka Singh 1/29 (8 overs)		Jessica MacFadyen 75 (93); Anna Peterson 3/43 (7.4 overs)

Auckland Hearts won by 110 runs
Karori Park, Wellington
Umpires: Cory Black and Tyron Davies

- Wellington Blaze won the toss and elected to field.
- Points: Auckland Hearts 5, Wellington Blaze 0

20 February 2021
Scorecard

Canterbury Magicians; 228/7 (50 overs)	v	Central Hinds; 150 (43.4 overs)
Kate Ebrahim 102* (150); Claudia Green 1/29 (8 overs)		Monique Rees 24* (47); Jessica Simmons 3/23 (10 overs)

Canterbury Magicians won by 78 runs
MainPower Oval, Rangiora
Umpires: Kannan Jagannathan and Kim Cotton

- Central Hinds won the toss and elected to field.
- Points: Canterbury Magicians 5, Central Hinds 0

=== Round 8 ===
21 February 2021
Scorecard

Northern Districts; 292/7 (50 overs)	v	Otago Sparks; 216 (46.5 overs)
Felicity Leydon-Davis 88 (93); Emma Black 2/51 (10 overs)		Marina Lamplough 43 (46); Eimear Richardson 4/21 (10 overs)

Northern Districts won by 76 runs
Seddon Park, Hamilton
Umpires: Christelle High and Lui Els

- Northern Districts won the toss and elected to bat.
- Points: Northern Districts 5, Otago Sparks 0

21 February 2021
Scorecard

Wellington Blaze; 200 (50 overs)	v	Auckland Hearts; 202/2 (39.2 overs)
Jess McFadyen 52 (63); Holly Huddleston 4/29 (10 overs)		Lauren Down 104* (124); Xara Jetly 1/21 (4 overs)

Auckland Hearts won by 8 wickets
Karori Park, Wellington
Umpires: Cory Black and Tyron Davies

- Wellington Blaze won the toss and elected to bat.
- Points: Auckland Hearts 5, Wellington Blaze 0

21 February 2021
Scorecard

Canterbury Magicians; 182 (46.4 overs)	v	Central Hinds; 183/8 (41.5 overs)
Laura Hughes 51 (68); Georgia Atkinson 4/50 (10 overs)		Jess Watkin 66 (68); Jessica Simmons 3/35 (9.5 overs)

Central Hinds won by 2 wickets
MainPower Oval, Rangiora
Umpires: Kannan Jagannathan and Kim Cotton

- Central Hinds won the toss and elected to field.
- Points: Canterbury Magicians 4, Central Hinds 0

=== Round 9 ===
13 March 2021
Scorecard

Otago Sparks; 180 (47.2 overs)	v	Wellington Blaze; 183/2 (23.4 overs)
Katey Martin 70 (80); Leigh Kasperek 4/28 (7.2 overs)		Sophie Devine 97 (54); Hayley Jensen 1/29 (7 overs)

Wellington Blaze won by 8 wickets
Basin Reserve, Wellington
Umpires: Allen Stanley and Tyron Davies

- Wellington Blaze won the toss and elected to field.
- Points: Wellington Blaze 5, Otago Sparks 0

13 March 2021
Scorecard

Canterbury Magicians; 204 (48.1 overs)	v	Auckland Hearts; 180 (45.1 overs)
Frances Mackay 75 (111); Anna Peterson 5/30 (7.1 overs)		Katie Perkins 69 (99); Gabby Sullivan 4/51 (9 overs)

Canterbury Magicians won by 24 runs
Eden Park, Auckland
Umpires: K Hogue and Pete Pasco

- Canterbury Magicians won the toss and elected to bat.
- Points: Canterbury Magicians 4, Auckland Hearts 0

13 March 2021
Scorecard

Central Hinds; 176 (49.1 overs)	v	Northern Districts; 177/2 (34.2 overs)
Kerry-Anne Tomlinson 57 (107); Brooke Halliday 2/32 (7 overs)		Brooke Halliday 59 (83); Monique Rees 1/25 (3 overs)

Northern Spirit won by 8 wickets
Pukekura Park, New Plymouth
Umpires: RCR Combe and TS Shirriffs

- Northern Districts won the toss and elected to field.
- Points: Northern Districts 5, Central Hinds 0

=== Round 10 ===
14 March 2021
Scorecard

Wellington Blaze; 321/8 (50 overs)	v	Otago Sparks; 146 (33.4 overs)
Sophie Devine 74 (44); Sophie Oldershaw 3/57 (10 overs)		Katey Martin 64 (62); Jess Kerr 3/9 (4.4 overs)

Wellington won by 175 runs
Basin Reserve, Wellington
Umpires: TR Davies and A Stanley

- Wellington won the toss and elected to bat.
- Points: Wellington Blaze 4, Otago Sparks 0

14 March 2021
Scorecard

Auckland Hearts; 216 (49.1 overs)	v	Canterbury Magicians; 206/8 (50 overs)
Lauren Down 75 (111); Frances Mackay 5/40 (9 overs)		Amy Satterthwaite 96 (96); Jesse Prasad 3/47 (8 overs)

Auckland Hearts won by 10 runs
Eden Park, Auckland
Umpires: K Hogue and Pete Pasco

- Auckland Hearts won the toss and elected to bat.
- Points: Auckland Hearts 4, Canterbury Magicians 0

14 March 2021
Scorecard

Central Hinds; 166 (44.2 overs)	v	Northern Districts; 153 (44 overs)
Hannah Rowe 43 (70); Charlotte Sarsfield 3/31 (10 overs)		Nensi Patel 53* (87); Ashtuti Kumar 3/28 (9 overs)

Central Hinds won by 13 runs
Pukekura Park, New Plymouth
Umpires: RCR Combe and TS Shirriffs

- Northern Districts won the toss and elected to field.
- Points: Central Hinds 4, Northern Districts 0

== Final ==
21 March 2021
Scorecard

Auckland Hearts; 185 (47.5 overs)	v	Canterbury Magicians; 188/2 (37.4 overs)
Katie Perkins 52 (64); Amy Satterthwaite 4/27 (8.5 overs)		Frances Mackay 94* (112); Anna Peterson 1/30 (7.4 overs)

Canterbury Magicians won by 8 wickets
Eden Park, Auckland
Umpires: Kim Cotton and Pete Pasco

- Auckland Hearts won the toss and elected to bat.

== Statistics ==
=== Most runs ===
Player	Team	Matches	Innings	Runs	Average	HS	100s	50s
Kate Ebrahim	Canterbury Magicians	11	11	480	60.00	106*	2	2
Frances Mackay	Canterbury Magicians	9	9	455	56.87	142	1	3
Jess McFadyen	Wellington Blaze	10	10	397	49.62	107	1	3
Lauren Down	Auckland Hearts	9	9	351	43.87	104*	1	2
Katie Perkins	Auckland Hearts	9	9	342	48.85	69	0	3

Source: ESPN Cricinfo

=== Most wickets ===
Player	Team	Overs	Wickets	Average	BBI	5w
Sarah Asmussen	Canterbury Magicians	87.0	19	18.84	4/9	0
Eimear Richardson	Northern Districts	73.1	17	16.82	4/21	0
Jesse Prasad	Auckland Hearts	53.5	14	14.57	3/47	0
Jess Watkin	Central Hinds	84.2	14	17.92	4/13	0
Frances Mackay	Canterbury Magicians	76.1	14	19.07	5/40	1

Source: ESPN Cricinfo
