= List of international men's cricket grounds in New Zealand =

NZ Men's Int'l Cricket Grounds

Locations of all stadiums which have hosted men's international cricket matches within New Zealand

This is a list of international men's cricket grounds in New Zealand, including all venues that have hosted Tests, One Day Internationals, and Twenty20 Internationals. As of December 2024, 16 venues have hosted men's international matches.

New Zealand played its first matches in each format at home. They played both their first test (against England in January 1930) and first ODI (against Pakistan in February 1973) at Lancaster Park. They played their first T20I (against Australia in February 2005) at Eden Park, which was also the first ever T20I.

== Men's international grounds ==
Below are complete lists of grounds used for men's international cricket in New Zealand, listed in order of first use (regardless of format). The dates given for Tests are that of the first day of the match. All matches are between New Zealand and team named, unless otherwise stated. Correct up to the end of the 2025/26 season.

=== Active venues ===
Name	Location	First	Last	Matches	First	Last	Matches	First	Last	Matches	Notes
Name	Location	Test			One Day International			Twenty20 International			Notes
Basin Reserve	Wellington	24 Jan 1930 vs England	10 Dec 2025 vs West Indies	70	9 Mar 1975 vs England	5 Jan 2025 vs Sri Lanka	31	-	-	0	
Eden Park	Auckland	14 Feb 1930 vs England	22 Mar 2018 vs England	50	22 Feb 1976 vs India	25 Jan 2025 vs Sri Lanka	80	17 Feb 2005 vs Australia	20 Mar 2026 vs South Africa	33	No longer hosts Tests.
McLean Park	Napier	16 Feb 1979 vs Pakistan	26 Jan 2012 vs Zimbabwe	10	19 Mar 1983 vs Sri Lanka	19 Nov 2025 vs West Indies	47	3 Jan 2017 vs Bangladesh	27 Dec 2023 vs Bangladesh	6	No longer hosts Tests.
Seddon Park	Hamilton	22 Feb 1991 vs Sri Lanka	14 Dec 2024 vs England	29	15 Feb 1981 vs India	22 Nov 2025 vs West Indies	43	28 Dec 2008 vs West Indies	17 Mar 2026 vs South Africa	14	
Hnry Stadium	Wellington	-	-	0	8 Jan 2000 vs West Indies	1 Nov 2025 vs England	32	22 Dec 2006 vs Sri Lanka	22 Mar 2026 vs South Africa	18	
John Davies Oval	Queenstown	-	-	0	4 Jan 2003 vs India	1 Jan 2014 vs West Indies	9	8 Apr 2023 vs Sri Lanka		1	
University Oval	Dunedin	4 Jan 2008 vs Bangladesh	8 Mar 2017 vs South Africa	8	8 Feb 2010 vs Bangladesh	17 Dec 2023 vs Bangladesh	12	25 Feb 2021 vs Australia	13 Nov 2025 vs West Indies	5	
Saxton Oval	Nelson	-	-	0	4 Jan 2014 vs West Indies	20 Dec 2023 vs Bangladesh	12	29 Dec 2017 vs West Indies	10 Nov 2025 vs West Indies	5	
Hagley Oval	Christchurch	26 Dec 2014 vs Sri Lanka	2 Dec 2025 vs West Indies	15	23 Jan 2014 Canada vs Scotland	16 Nov 2025 vs West Indies	17	1 Nov 2019 vs England	25 Mar 2026 vs South Africa	15	
Bay Oval	Tauranga	21 Nov 2019 vs England	18 Dec 2025 vs West Indies	6	28 Jan 2014 Canada vs Netherlands	26 Oct 2025 vs England	13	7 Jan 2016 vs Sri Lanka	15 Mar 2026 vs South Africa	19	

=== Former venues ===
The following grounds have not been used in at least the past three seasons. Unless otherwise stated, these grounds could theoretically host men's international cricket again.

Name	Location	First	Last	Matches	First	Last	Matches	First	Last	Matches	Notes
Name	Location	Test			One Day International			Twenty20 International			Notes
Lancaster Park	Christchurch	10 Jan 1930 vs England	7 Dec 2006 vs Sri Lanka	40	11 Feb 1973 vs Pakistan	29 Jan 2011 vs Pakistan	48	7 Dec 2008 vs England	30 Dec 2010 vs Pakistan	4	Demolished following the 2011 Christchurch earthquake.
Carisbrook	Dunedin	11 Mar 1955 vs England	7 Mar 1997 vs Sri Lanka	10	30 Mar 1974 vs Australia	25 Feb 2004 vs South Africa	21	-	-	0	Closed in 2011.
Pukekura Park	New Plymouth	-	-	0	23 Feb 1992 Sri Lanka vs Zimbabwe		1	-	-	0	Hosted one ODI during the 1992 Cricket World Cup.
Owen Delany Park	Taupō	-	-	0	9 Jan 1999 vs India	2 Jan 2001 vs Zimbabwe	3	-	-	0	
Cobham Oval (new)	Whangārei	-	-	0	6 Feb 2012 vs Zimbabwe	20 Dec 2017 vs West Indies	2	-	-	0	
Bert Sutcliffe Oval	Lincoln	-	-	0	23 Jan 2014 Kenya vs Netherlands	1 Feb 2014 Scotland vs United Arab Emirates	2	-	-	0	
