= Kayley Knight =

New Zealand cricketer (born 2003)

Personal information
- Full name: Kayley Alana Knight
- Born: 20 October 2003 (age 23); Gisborne, Poverty Bay, New Zealand
- Batting: Right-handed
- Bowling: Right-arm medium
- Role: Bowler

International information
- National side: New Zealand
- ODI debut: 01 April 2026 v South Africa
- Last ODI: 04 April 2026 v South Africa
- ODI shirt no.: 20
- T20I debut: 27 February 2026 v Zimbabwe
- Last T20I: 01 March 2026 v Zimbabwe
- T20I shirt no.: 20

Domestic team information
- Years: Team
- 2020/21–present: Northern Districts

Career statistics
Competition	WODI	WT20I	WLA	WT20
Matches	2	2	33	24
Runs scored	1	-	108	93
Batting average	-	-	9.81	15.50
100s/50s	0/0	0/0	0/0	0/0
Top score	1*	-	17	19
Balls bowled	102	42	1188	419
Wickets	3	2	49	18
Bowling average	37.66	20.50	20.83	26.94
5 wickets in innings	0	0	1	0
10 wickets in match	0	0	0	0
Best bowling	2/65	2/25	7/35	2/16
Catches/stumpings	0/–	1/–	4/–	7/–
- Source: NDCricket, 7 April 2026

Kayley Alona Knight (born 10 October 2003) is a New Zealand cricketer who currently plays for the New Zealand women's cricket team and Northern Districts in domestic cricket. She plays as a right-arm medium bowler.

== Career ==
Knight plays for Northern Districts in the Hallyburton Johnstone Shield and the Super Smash, following in the footsteps of her mother, Melinda Knight. She made her List A debut against Wellington in the 2020–21 New Zealand Women's One-Day Competition on 21 November 2020. She made her T20 debut the following year, against Otago, in the 2021–22 New Zealand Women's Twenty20 Competition on 3 December 2021.

She took her first (and currently only) List A 5-wicket haul (7-35) in the 2023–24 Hallyburton Johnstone Shield against Central Districts on 17 February 2024. She finished that season as the second highest wicket taker in the competition, with 18 wickets at 15.44

In February 2026 she made her international debut in the 2nd T20I against Zimbabwe, during their tour of New Zealand. She made her ODI debut in April 2026 against South Africa, debuting in the record-breaking 2nd ODI where she was not-out at the non-strikers end when the winning runs were hit.
