= List of Samoa women Twenty20 International cricketers =

This is a list of Samoan women Twenty20 International cricketers. A Twenty20 International (T20I) is an international cricket match between two representative teams, each having T20I status, as determined by the International Cricket Council (ICC). A T20I is played under the rules of Twenty20 cricket.

This list includes names of all players who have played at least one T20I match for Samoa and is initially arranged in the order of debut appearance. Where more than one player won their first cap in the same match, their names are initially listed alphabetically at the time of debut.

== Key ==
General

- ‡ – Captain
- † – Wicket-keeper
- First – Year of debut
- Last – Year of latest game
- Mat – Number of matches played

Batting

- Runs – Runs scored in career
- HS – Highest score
- Avg – Runs scored per dismissal
- * – Batsman remained not out

Bowling

- Wkt – Wickets taken in career
- BBI – Best bowling in an innings
- Ave – Average runs per wicket

Fielding

- Ca – Catches taken
- St – Stumpings affected

== Players ==
Statistics are correct as of 15 September 2025.

Samoa women T20I cricketers
General					Batting				Bowling				Fielding		Ref
No.	Name	First	Last	Mat	Runs	HS	Avg	50	Balls	Wkt	BBI	Ave	Ca	St	Ref
1	Litara Aoina	2019	2019	12	0	0*	–	0	36	3	2/9	14.33	1	0	
2	Solonaima Aoina	2019	2019	5	–	–	–	–	6	1	1/7	7.00	4	0	
3	Lelia Bourne†	2019	2019	12	93	47	10.33	0	–	–	–	–	4	8	
4	Taofi Lafai	2019	2023	23	147	18	11.30	0	410	16	3/13	22.81	5	0	
5	Regina Lili'i‡	2019	2025	22	530	51	33.12	1	135	11	3/3	8.63	12	0	
6	Taalili Iosefo	2019	2025	41	378	60*	15.12	1	690	47	3/5	12.46	10	0	
7	Lily Mulivai	2019	2019	12	152	21*	16.88	0	271	17	4/18	10.00	3	0	
8	Kolotita Nonu‡	2019	2023	27	200	57*	12.50	1	54	3	2/10	26.33	4	0	
9	Feala Pula	2019	2019	12	96	25*	16.00	0	12	0	–	–	6	0	
10	Maria Tato	2019	2019	12	13	7*	4.33	0	270	10	2/8	18.00	1	0	
11	Lagi Telea	2019	2024	28	191	28	8.30	0	507	40	4/16	9.52	3	0	
12	Kalala Tanuvasa†	2019	2022	8	36	20	9.00	0	–	–	–	–	7	0	
13	Faaiuga Sisifo	2019	2025	25	242	32*	12.10	0	48	1	1/9	67.00	3	0	
14	Ruth Johnston†	2019	2023	15	69	21	6.27	0	–	–	–	–	9	0	
15	Florence Agaimalo	2022	2023	11	69	21*	11.50	0	102	4	3/7	27.50	0	0	
16	Ailaoa Aoina	2022	2025	27	132	34	6.94	0	349	28	4/9	12.39	2	0	
17	Leofao Apolinasio	2022	2022	2	12	9	6.00	0	–	–	–	–	0	0	
18	Jacinta Sanele	2022	2025	30	232	20	8.92	0	496	23	4/34	19.04	8	0	
19	Tuaoloa Semau‡	2022	2025	29	106	24*	5.30	0	323	13	2/14	23.23	7	0	
20	Eleni Vaaetasi	2022	2024	11	65	16	16.25	0	66	3	2/7	25.00	2	0	
21	Ariota Kupito	2022	2023	12	8	4	1.60	0	72	3	1/10	30.66	0	0	
22	Sarina Moe	2022	2022	1	0	0	0.00	0	–	–	–	–	0	0	
23	Ituniu Faleupolu	2023	2023	3	4	4	2.00	0	–	–	–	–	0	0	
24	Vicky Tafea	2023	2023	8	18	6*	6.00	0	78	0	–	–	1	0	
25	Salema Toomaga	2023	2023	5	23	18*	11.50	0	12	1	1/11	11.00	1	0	
26	Matile Uliao	2023	2023	5	33	15	11.00	0	84	3	2/16	26.33	0	0	
27	Angel Sootaga†	2023	2025	18	94	42	10.44	0	–	–	–	–	4	0	
28	Apolonia Polataivao	2023	2023	1	1	1*	–	0	–	–	–	–	0	0	
29	Via Andrew	2023	2023	6	88	56*	17.60	1	–	–	–	–	0	0	
30	Teinemane Faimalo	2023	2023	4	8	6*	8.00	0	42	5	5/8	6.00	0	0	
31	Aunoa Iopu	2023	2023	5	34	20	8.50	0	24	4	3/2	6.00	1	0	
32	Leitu Leong	2023	2025	14	21	10*	2.62	0	–	–	–	–	2	0	
33	Avetia Mapu	2024	2025	18	71	29	6.45	0	144	2	1/10	70.50	1	0	
34	Francesca Nafanua†	2024	2024	4	4	4*	–	0	–	–	–	–	2	0	
35	Carol Agafili	2024	2025	12	147	31	13.36	0	84	4	2/15	23.50	8	0	
36	Jane Manase	2024	2025	4	4	4	4.00	0	18	0	–	–	0	0	
37	Olive Lefaga	2025	2025	13	39	11	5.57	0	264	18	6/8	10.77	4	0	
38	Filimaua Malotutoatasi	2025	2025	3	1	1*	–	0	–	–	–	–	0	0	
39	Norah Salima	2025	2025	10	6	5	1.50	0	30	1	1/6	24.00	4	0	
40	Masina Tafea	2025	2025	4	–	–	–	–	6	0	–	–	0	0	
41	Vanisi Talalelei	2025	2025	2	–	–	–	–	–	–	–	–	0	0	
42	Faatamalii Tiuga	2025	2025	1	–	–	–	–	–	–	–	–	0	0	
