= Lily Mulivai =

Samoan cricketer

Personal information
- Full name: Lily Sinei Mulivai
- Born: 3 August 1990 (age 36); Auckland, New Zealand
- Batting: Right-handed
- Bowling: Right-arm medium
- Role: All-rounder

International information
- National side: Samoa (2019–present)
- T20I debut (cap 7): 6 May 2019 v Fiji
- Last T20I: 13 July 2019 v Papua New Guinea

Domestic team information
- Years: Team
- 2018/19–present: Northern Districts

Career statistics
Competition	WT20I	WLA	WT20
Matches	12	15	29
Runs scored	152	105	218
Batting average	16.88	10.50	12.11
100s/50s	0/0	0/1	0/1
Top score	29*	63	21*
Balls bowled	271	462	523
Wickets	17	9	26
Bowling average	10.00	40.55	19.03
5 wickets in innings	0	0	0
10 wickets in match	0	0	0
Best bowling	4/18	2/8	4/18
Catches/stumpings	3/–	3/–	6/–
Medal record
Representing Samoa
Women's Cricket
Pacific Games
Gold medal – first place	2015 Port Moresby	20 over cricket
Gold medal – first place	2019 Apia	20 over cricket
- Source: CricketArchive, 30 April 2021

Lily Sinei Mulivai (born 3 August 1990) is a New Zealand-Samoan cricketer who plays for Northern Districts and Samoa.

Mulivai was born in Auckland and is the younger sister of Samoan cricketer Faasao Mulivai.

== International career ==
Mulivai was part of the Samoa one day international squad for the 2010 series against Fiji. She won gold with the women's team at the 2015 and 2019 Pacific Games.
