= Northern Districts women's cricket team =

Women's cricket team in New Zealand

Northern Districts Women
- Logo of the Northern Brave

Personnel
- Captain: Jess Watkin
- Coach: Peter Borren

Team information
- Colours: NK
- Founded: First recorded match: 1999
- Home ground: Seddon Park, Hamilton
- Secondary home ground(s): Bay Oval, Mount Maunganui; Cobham Oval, Whangārei

History
- HBJS wins: 1
- SS wins: 0
- Official website: Northern Districts

The Northern Districts women's cricket team is the women's representative cricket team in New Zealand. Based in the northern half of New Zealand's North Island, they compete in the Hallyburton Johnstone Shield one-day competition and also the Women's Super Smash Twenty20 competition. The team won the Hallyburton Johnstone Shield for the first time in the 2025-26 season. They play their home games at Seddon Park, Hamilton, Bay Oval, Mount Maunganui and Cobham Oval, Whangārei. The T20 side is known as the Northern Brave.

== History ==
Northern Districts joined the New Zealand women's domestic structure in 1999–00.

Northern Districts' best finish in the Super Smash came in its inaugural season, when they finished 3rd with 3 wins. In 2019–20, they reached the final of the Hallyburton Johnstone Shield, but lost by 67 runs to Auckland, despite batter Felicity Leydon-Davis scoring 124. Northern Districts' Caitlin Gurrey was the leading run-scorer across the whole tournament, with 576 runs. In 2020–21, the side finished 4th in both competitions, with 5 wins in the Shield and 3 in the Super Smash.

On 9 October 2021, it was announced that the Northern Districts Cricket Association were combining the brands of the men's and women's teams for the Super Smash, with both teams becoming known as Northern Brave.

Northern Districts' won the Hallyburton Johnstone Shield for the first time in the 2025-26 season.

== Grounds ==
Northern Districts' first match was played at St Paul's Collegiate Ground. Their primary ground soon became Westpac Trust Park, Hamilton, as well as using Wintech Park in the same city.

From 2005, Northern Districts began using Blake Park, Mount Maunganui (later Bay Oval) as their main home ground, as well as later using Cobham Oval, Whangārei and returning to Westpac Trust Park, now renamed Seddon Park. The side has also occasionally used St Peter's School, Cambridge, as well as returning to St Paul's Collegiate Ground. In 2021–22 and 2022–23, they played the majority of their home games at Seddon Park, as well as playing at Bay Oval and at Cobham Oval.

== Players ==
=== Current squad ===
Based on squad announced for the 2023–24 season. Players in bold have international caps.

No.	Name	Nationality	Birth date	Batting style	Bowling style	Notes
Batters
3	Lucy Boucher	New Zealand	23 October 2001 (age 24)	Right-handed	Right-arm medium	
13	Yasmeen Kareem	New Zealand	8 September 1999 (age 26)	Left-handed	Right-arm medium	
23	**Caitlin Gurrey**	New Zealand	19 July 1995 (age 30)	Right-handed	—	
28	**Samantha Barriball**	New Zealand	28 October 1985 (age 40)	Right-handed	Right-arm leg break	
All-rounders
2	**Carol Agafili**	New Zealand	20 November 2002 (age 23)	Right-handed	Right-arm medium	
4	**Jess Watkin**	New Zealand	7 May 1998 (age 28)	Right-handed	Right-arm off break	
8	**Eimear Richardson**	Ireland	14 September 1986 (age 39)	Right-handed	Right-arm off break	Captain
15	Nensi Patel	New Zealand	27 May 2002 (age 24)	Right-handed	Right-arm medium	
Wicket-keepers
5	Holly Topp	New Zealand	21 August 2001 (age 24)	Right-handed	—	
12	**Bernadine Bezuidenhout**	New Zealand	14 September 1993 (age 32)	Right-handed	—	
Bowlers
7	**Marina Lamplough**	Hong Kong	28 September 1999 (age 26)	Right-handed	Right-arm medium	
11	Marama Downes	New Zealand	4 December 2002 (age 23)	Unknown	Right-arm medium	
19	Tash Wakelin	New Zealand	19 December 2005 (age 20)	Right-handed	Right-arm off break	
20	Kayley Knight	New Zealand	20 October 2003 (age 22)	Right-handed	Right-arm medium	
26	Shriya Naidu	New Zealand	26 November 1995 (age 30)	Right-handed	Right-arm medium	
35	Jesse Prasad	New Zealand	19 January 1999 (age 27)	Right-handed	Right-arm medium	
74	Eve Wolland	New Zealand	7 July 2006 (age 20)	Right-handed	Right-arm medium	

=== Notable players ===
Players who have played for Northern Districts and played internationally are listed below, in order of first international appearance (given in brackets):

- (New Zealand) Emily Drumm (1992)
- (Ireland) Catherine O'Neill (1993)
- (Ireland) Caitriona Beggs (1995)
- (England) Charlotte Edwards (1996)
- (New Zealand) Katie Pulford (1999)
- (New Zealand) Donna Trow (1999)
- (Scotland) Kari Carswell (2001)
- (England) Mandie Godliman (2002)
- (New Zealand) Nicola Browne (2002)
- (New Zealand) Louise Milliken (2002)
- (Ireland) Eimear Richardson (2005)
- (New Zealand) Ros Kember (2006)
- (Australia) Elyse Villani (2009)
- (Sri Lanka) Chamari Athapaththu (2009)
- (New Zealand) Morna Nielsen (2010)
- (New Zealand) Natalie Dodd (2010)
- (New Zealand) Kelly Anderson (2011)
- (Netherlands) Kerry-Anne Tomlinson (2011)
- (New Zealand) Anna Peterson (2012)
- (Australia) Holly Ferling (2013)
- (New Zealand) Samantha Curtis (2014)
- (New Zealand) Holly Huddleston (2014)
- (New Zealand) Hayley Jensen (2014)
- (New Zealand) Felicity Leydon-Davis (2014)
- (South Africa) (New Zealand) Bernadine Bezuidenhout (2014) (Note: Bezuidenhout represented both South Africa and New Zealand in international cricket.)
- (Australia) Beth Mooney (2016)
- (Australia) Naomi Stalenberg (2016)
- (Australia) Amanda-Jade Wellington (2016)
- (Australia) Ashleigh Gardner (2017)
- (New Zealand) Jess Watkin (2018)
- (Scotland) Katie McGill (2018)
- (Singapore) Neisha Pratt (2018)
- (New Zealand) Caitlin Gurrey (2019)
- (Hong Kong) Marina Lamplough (2019)
- (Samoa) Regina Lili'i (2019)
- (Samoa) Lily Mulivai (2019)
- (New Zealand) Brooke Halliday (2021)
- (New Zealand) Kate Anderson (2023)
- (Samoa) Carol Agafili (2024)
- (New Zealand) Kayley Knight (2026)
- (India) Nensi Patel (2026)

Olympian Emma Twigg has also represented the team, fielding as the twelfth man in Northern Districts' final match of the 2021–22 Super Smash.

== Coaching staff ==
- Head Coach: Peter Borren

== Honours ==
- Hallyburton Johnstone Shield:
  - Winners (1): 2025-26
  - Best finish: Runners-up (2019–20)
- Women's Super Smash:
  - Winners (0):
  - Best finish: 3rd (2007–08)

== See also ==
- Northern Districts men's cricket team
