= Natalie Dodd =

New Zealand cricketer (born 1992)

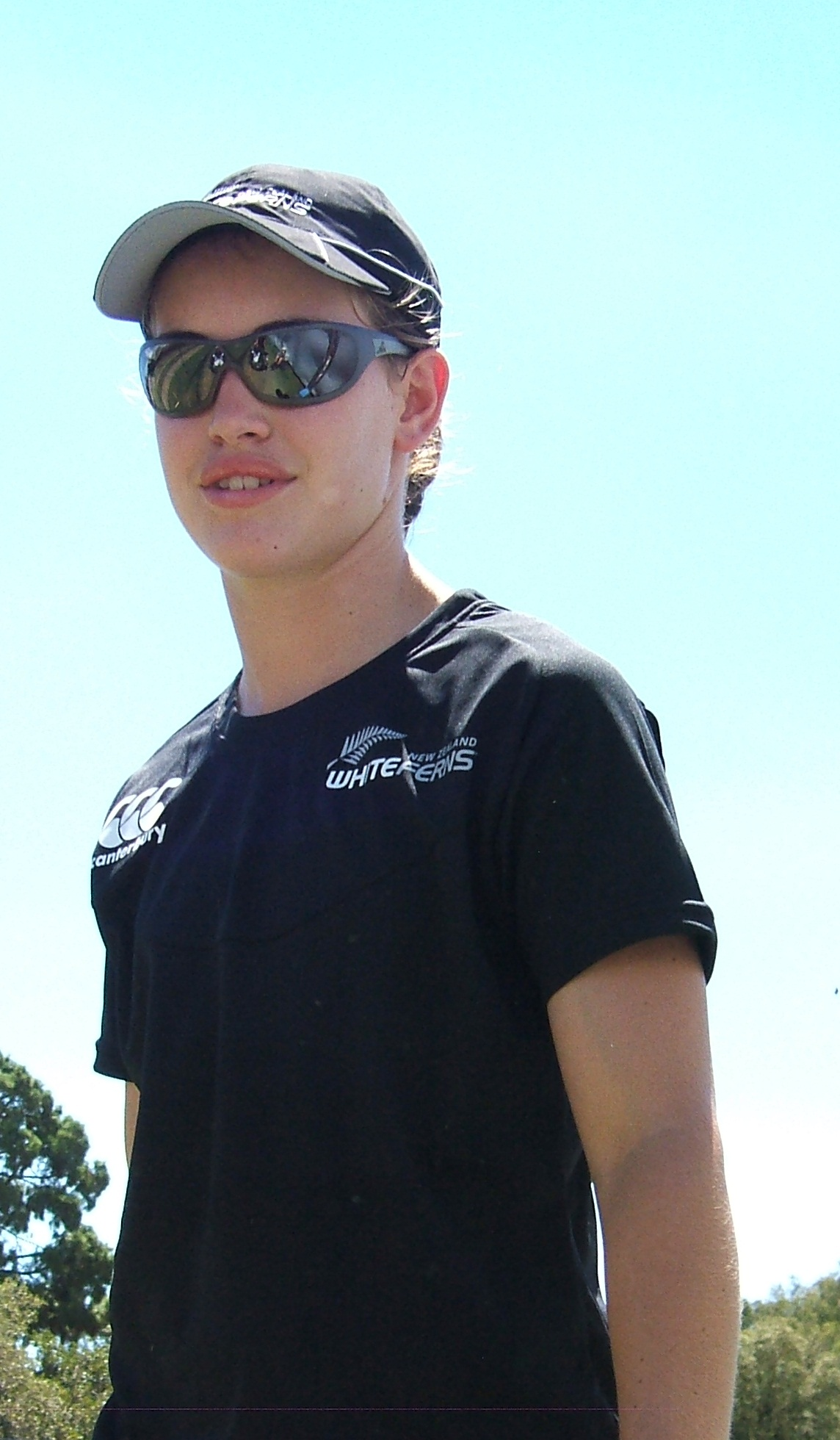
- Dodd in 2010

Personal information
- Full name: Natalie Claire Dodd
- Born: 22 November 1992 (age 33); Hamilton, Waikato, New Zealand
- Batting: Right-handed
- Bowling: Right-arm off break
- Role: Wicket-keeper

International information
- National side: New Zealand (2010–present)
- ODI debut (cap 116): 14 February 2010 v Australia
- Last ODI: 28 February 2021 v England
- T20I debut (cap 45): 11 July 2015 v India
- Last T20I: 25 March 2018 v West Indies

Domestic team information
- Years: Team
- 2007/08–2017/18: Northern Districts
- 2018/19–present: Central Hinds

Career statistics
Competition	WODI	WT20I
Matches	18	6
Runs scored	224	26
Batting average	13.17	8.66
100s/50s	0/1	0/0
Top score	52	14
Catches/stumpings	6/–	0/–
- Source: ESPNcricinfo, 8 April 2021

Natalie Claire Dodd (born 22 November 1992 in Hamilton) is a New Zealand cricketer who has represented New Zealand in women's one-day internationals. She made her international debut in 2010 as a teenager in year 12 at Waikato Diocesan School.

== Career ==
A prolific top order batsman, Dodd started playing cricket when she was around 10 and quickly developed her skills and made her first rep side at age 11 when selected for the Northern Districts under-14 team. She now is a teacher and spent some years teaching at Te Kowhai school in the Waikato. She currently works at Korakonui School as she has done since 2016. In 2020 she was appointed as a deputy principal of a little country school.

In January 2013, she was named in national squad for the 2013 Women's Cricket World Cup. She scored maiden half century to beat South Africa in 5th ODI and sealed the series 4–1. She played a 91 innings for New Zealand XI against England in 2021.

After more than a decade with Northern Spirit, in July 2018 Dodd switched to the Central Hinds to reinvigorate her career. She ended the 2018/19 season as the Central Hinds' top run-scorer, with the first title of her long domestic career, having helped the team win the one-day Hallyburton Johnstone Shield.

In March 2019, she was named as the Women's Domestic Player of the Year and the recipient of the Ruth Martin Cup for batting at the annual New Zealand Cricket awards. In June 2020, Dodd was awarded with a central contract by New Zealand Cricket ahead of the 2020–21 season. In August 2024, she was dropped from Central Hinds contract for the 2024–25 session due to her first child birth.
