= Rangiora Recreation Ground =

Cricket ground in Rangiora, New Zealand

Coordinates: 43°17′31.81″S 172°35′57.68″E

Ground information
- Location: Rangiora, New Zealand
- Establishment: 1891 (first recorded match)

Team information
| Canterbury Women | (2007–2010) |
| Canterbury | (2004–present) |
| Canterbury Country | (2005–present) |
- As of 29 April 2022; Source: Ground profile

Rangiora Recreation Ground (also known as the MainPower Oval through a sponsorship deal with local company MainPower) is a cricket ground in Rangiora, Canterbury, New Zealand.

The Recreation Ground is recorded as being in existence since the early 1870s, and used for cricket since 1891. It first held a first-class match when Canterbury played Central Districts in the 2003/04 State Championship. Since the 2011 Christchurch earthquake damaged Lancaster Park beyond repair, Canterbury have played many of their first-class home matches in Rangiora. Canterbury first played a List A match there in the 2003/04 State Shield when they played Auckland, with eight matches in that format having been held there in the 2011-12 Ford Trophy as well as a handful of Twenty20 matches. By the end of the 2024–25 season, there had been 42 first-class matches at the ground, and 32 List A matches.

Two Youth One Day Internationals have been played at Rangiora Recreation Ground, both in the 2010 Under-19 World Cup when England Under-19s played West Indies Under-19s and Australia Under-19s. The ground has also been used a home venue for Canterbury Women in the State League since the 2006/07 season.

The Canterbury Country Hawke Cup team use Rangiora Recreation Ground as their home ground. They successfully defended their title there against North Otago in 2014–15.
