= Fitzherbert Park =

Cricket ground in Palmerston North, New Zealand

Coordinates: 40.3689°S 175.6161°E

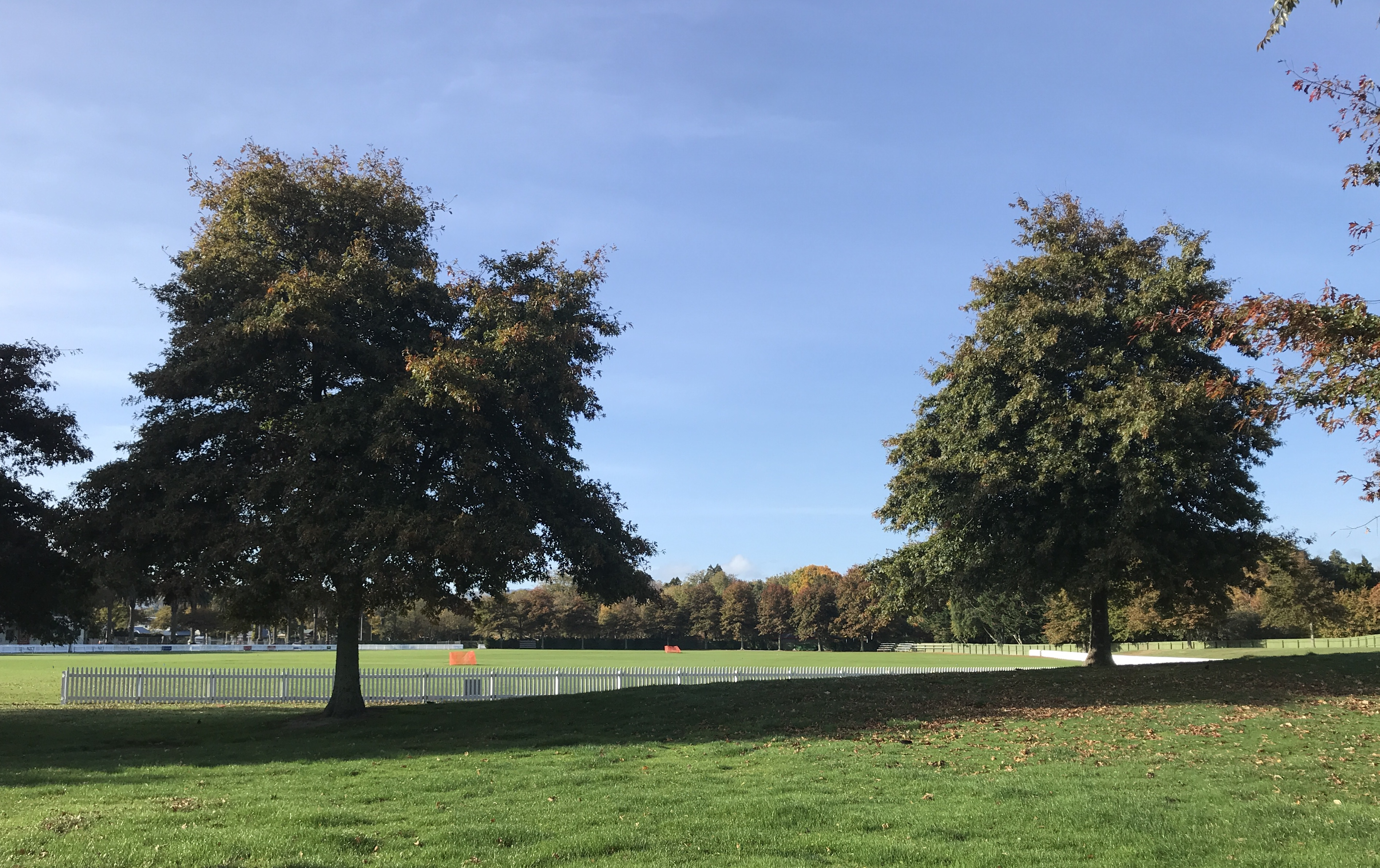
- Fitzherbert Park.
- Interactive map of Fitzherbert Park

Ground information
- Location: Palmerston North, New Zealand
- Country: New Zealand
- Establishment: 1902 (first recorded match)
- End names
- n/a

International information
- First women's ODI: 20 January 1982: Australia v International XI
- Last women's ODI: 17 February 2000: New Zealand v England

Team information
| Central Districts | (1951–present) |
- As of 1 September 2020; Source: Ground profile

Fitzherbert Park is a cricket ground in Palmerston North in New Zealand, a home ground of the Central Districts. In February 2000, New Zealand Women defeated England Women at the ground, in the opening match of a 5-ODI series.

The ground is situated on Fitzherbert Avenue in the parklands beside the Manawatū River. Known originally just as the Sportsground, it was renamed Fitzherbert Park in 1973.

== Re-development ==
With the development of the NZC Warrant of Fitness (WOF) and increasing expectations of the modern game, Fitzherbert Park lost their NZC WOF due to the lack of effective irrigation to the outfield in droughty summers, causing a brown bumpy outfield that first class players did not like.

Fitzherbert Park is unusual as it has three cricket blocks (two club and one representative) and a practice block within the one facility.

Fitzherbert Park regained its warrant of fitness during the 2021-22 season and now hosts Plunket Shield, T20 and one day provincial cricket. A new 10 lane practice facility was built in 2020-21 off the playing oval in the north eastern corner. No winter sport is played over the cricket blocks anymore.

To regain the NZC WOF Palmerston North City Council in consultation with Manawatu Cricket Association have since 2013:

- Extended the drainage across the whole ground
- Installed a full outfield pop up irrigation system
- Resurfaced the two Patumahoe blocks
- Replaced the Marton soil with Patumahoe on the town end block.
- Built a new practice facility
- Built a scores box at the top of the Grandstand
- Gravel banded the outfield to link into the drainage system
- Up graded lounge facilities for players
- Up graded the lower changing rooms and toilets into unisex facilities
