= Fran Jonas =

New Zealand cricketer

Personal information
- Full name: Frances Cecilia Jonas
- Born: 8 April 2004 (age 22); Auckland, New Zealand
- Batting: Right-handed
- Bowling: Slow left-arm orthodox
- Role: Bowler

International information
- National side: New Zealand
- ODI debut (cap 142): 23 February 2021 v England
- Last ODI: 29 October 2024 v India
- T20I debut (cap 60): 30 July 2022 v South Africa
- Last T20I: 20 October 2024 v South Africa
- T20I shirt no.: 26

Domestic team information
- Years: Team
- 2019/20–present: Auckland
- 2023–present: Trinbago Knight Riders

Career statistics
Competition	WODI	WT20I
Matches	25	39
Runs scored	14	12
Batting average	3.50	12.00
100s/50s	0/0	0/0
Top score	5*	4*
Balls bowled	1,050	761
Wickets	17	30
Bowling average	47.70	25.20
5 wickets in innings	0	0
10 wickets in match	0	0
Best bowling	2/22	4/22
Catches/stumpings	5/–	13/–
Medal record
Women's cricket
Representing New Zealand
ICC T20 World Cup
Winner	2024 UAE
Commonwealth Games
Bronze medal – third place	2022 Birmingham
- Source: Cricinfo, 29 October 2024

Frances Cecilia Jonas (born 8 April 2004) is a New Zealand cricketer who plays for Auckland as a slow left-arm orthodox bowler. In February 2021, Jonas earned her maiden call-up to the New Zealand women's cricket team, for their Women's One Day International (WODI) series against England in February and March 2021.

== Career ==
Jonas is a left-arm orthodox spinner. She started playing cricket at the age of six, and until the age of 10, she played in boy's teams. She has played for Cornwall Cricket Club in Auckland, New Zealand, as well as the New Zealand under-22s indoor cricket team.

In December 2019, at the age of 15, Jonas made her debut for Auckland Hearts in the 2019–20 Hallyburton Johnstone Shield. She took three wickets in the Hallyburton Johnstone Shield final, as Auckland Hearts beat Northern Spirit. She was at one point in the season the fourth highest wicket taker in the 2020–21 Hallyburton Johnstone Shield, with nine wickets. Jonas also took eight wickets for Auckland Hearts in the 2020–21 Super Smash competition.

In September 2020, Jonas was given a development contract by the New Zealand women's cricket team; she was the youngest player to receive a development contract. In January 2021, Jonas was named in the New Zealand under-19s squad for matches against a New Zealand Police women's team and a New Zealand provincial team, to take place between February and April 2021. In February 2021, Jonas earned her maiden call-up to the New Zealand women's cricket team, for their three-match Women's One Day International (WODI) series against England. As part of the preparation for the series, she played in two warm-up matches for the New Zealand XI Women's team, taking two wickets. She made her WODI debut for New Zealand, against England, on 23 February 2021.

In March 2021, Jonas was named in New Zealand's Women's Twenty20 International (WT20I) squad for their series against Australia. In February 2022, she was named in New Zealand's team for the 2022 Women's Cricket World Cup in New Zealand. In June 2022, Jonas was named in New Zealand's team for the cricket tournament at the 2022 Commonwealth Games in Birmingham, England. Jonas made her WT20I debut on 30 July 2022, for New Zealand against South Africa at the Commonwealth Games.

In December 2022, Jonas was selected in the New Zealand Under-19 squad for the 2023 ICC Under-19 Women's T20 World Cup.

In September 2024 she was named in the New Zealand squad for the 2024 ICC Women's T20 World Cup.

Jonas was named in the New Zealand squad for their ODI tour to India in October 2024.

== Personal life ==
Jonas was a student at Baradene College of the Sacred Heart. Her elder brother is also a cricketer, and her father is her coach.
