= Felicity Leydon-Davis =

New Zealand cricketer (born 1994)

Felicity Robertson
Personal information
- Full name: Felicity Carol Robertson
- Born: 22 June 1994 (age 32); Hamilton, New Zealand
- Batting: Right-handed
- Bowling: Right-arm medium
- Role: All-rounder

International information
- National side: New Zealand (2014–2016)
- Only ODI (cap 130): 26 February 2014 v West Indies
- T20I debut (cap 42): 2 March 2014 v West Indies
- Last T20I: 4 March 2016 v Australia

Domestic team information
- Years: Team
- 2009/10–2020/21: Northern Districts
- 2014/15: Queensland
- 2018: Devon
- 2021/22–present: Otago

Career statistics
Competition	WODI	WT20I
Matches	1	8
Runs scored	10	–
Batting average	–	–
100s/50s	0/0	–
Top score	10*	–
Balls bowled	50	132
Wickets	5	4
Bowling average	3.60	30.00
5 wickets in innings	1	0
10 wickets in match	0	0
Best bowling	5/18	2/15
Catches/stumpings	0/–	2/–
- Source: CricketArchive, 8 April 2021

Felicity Carol Robertson (née Leydon-Davis; born 22 June 1994) is a New Zealand cricketer who currently plays for Otago. She took a five-wicket haul on her Women's One Day International (WODI) debut.
