= Jess Watkin =

New Zealand cricketer (born 1998)

Personal information
- Full name: Jessica Marie Watkin
- Born: 7 May 1998 (age 28); Whanganui, New Zealand
- Batting: Right-handed
- Bowling: Right-arm off break
- Role: All-rounder

International information
- National side: New Zealand
- ODI debut (cap 138): 8 June 2018 v Ireland
- Last ODI: 13 July 2018 v England
- T20I debut (cap 52): 6 June 2018 v Ireland
- Last T20I: 17 November 2018 v Ireland

Domestic team information
- Years: Team
- 2013/14–2022/23: Central Districts
- 2023/24–present: Northern Districts

Career statistics
Competition	WODI	WT20I
Matches	6	9
Runs scored	86	118
Batting average	17.20	16.85
100s/50s	0/1	0/1
Top score	62	77*
Balls bowled	177	123
Wickets	6	7
Bowling average	18.83	18.85
5 wickets in innings	0	0
10 wickets in match	0	0
Best bowling	2/30	3/9
Catches/stumpings	0/–	1/–
- Source: Cricinfo, 18 September 2020

Jessica Marie Watkin (born 7 May 1998) is a New Zealand cricketer. She made her Women's Twenty20 International cricket (WT20I) debut for New Zealand against Ireland Women on 6 June 2018. On debut, she and Suzie Bates made the highest partnership for New Zealand Women and the fifth-largest partnership for any team in W2T0Is, scoring an unbeaten 142 runs. She made her Women's One Day International cricket (WODI) debut for New Zealand, also against Ireland Women, on 8 June 2018.

In August 2018, she was awarded a central contract by New Zealand Cricket, following the tours of Ireland and England in the previous months. In October 2018, she was named in New Zealand's squad for the 2018 ICC Women's World Twenty20 tournament in the West Indies.

Having played for Central Districts since the 2013–14 season, she joined Northern Districts ahead of the 2023–24 season.
