= Cobham Oval =

Cricket ground in Whangārei, New Zealand

Cobham Oval (New)

Ground information
- Location: Whangārei, New Zealand
- Country: New Zealand
- Coordinates: 35°44′06″S 174°19′53″E
- Establishment: 2006
- Capacity: 5,500
- Owner: Northland Cricket Association
- Architect: Butt Design Group
- Operator: Northland Cricket Association
- Tenants: Northern Districts; Northland

International information
- First ODI: 6 February 2012: New Zealand v Zimbabwe
- Last ODI: 20 December 2017: New Zealand v West Indies
- First WODI: 1 February 2009: New Zealand v Australia
- Last WODI: 3 February 2009: New Zealand v Australia
- First WT20I: 19 February 2015: New Zealand v England
- Last WT20I: 20 February 2015: New Zealand v England
- As of 1 September 2020; Source: Cricinfo

Cobham Oval is a cricket ground in Whangārei, New Zealand, next to the Okara Park rugby stadium. It stages daytime-only first-class and List A matches. It is the home ground and headquarters of the Northland cricket team and one of the home grounds for the Northern Districts cricket team. It is named after Lord Cobham, New Zealand's Governor-General from 1957 to 1962.

== The old Cobham Oval ==
A previous ground, also called Cobham Oval, situated about 300 metres to the north of the present ground, was officially opened in February 1961 during the two-day match between Northland and the touring Marylebone Cricket Club team. It staged 11 first-class matches between 1966 and 2001. In the early 2000s, the land was sold and used to build a Warehouse retail outlet.

== The new Cobham Oval ==
The new Cobham Oval was built in 2005. Its pavilion is modelled on the pavilion at Lord's in London. It held its first first-class match in 2009, and as of April 2025 it had staged 26 first-class matches (but none since the 2021–22 season). Beginning in 2006–07, it has also staged 37 List A matches, including two ODI matches.

Cobham Oval became New Zealand's twelfth international cricket venue when a One Day International against Zimbabwe was held on Waitangi Day (6 February 2012). It also hosted a One Day International against West Indies on 20 December 2017.

== International centuries ==
Only one international century has been achieved at the ground.

No.	Score	Player	Team	Balls	Inns.	Opposing team	Date	Result
1	146	Rob Nicol	New Zealand	134	1	Zimbabwe	6 February 2012	Won
