= Caitlin Gurrey =

New Zealand cricketer (born 1995)

Caitlin Ann Gurrey
Personal information
- Full name: Caitlin Ann Gurrey
- Born: 3 May 1995 (age 31); Wellington, New Zealand
- Batting: Right-handed
- Bowling: Right-arm medium
- Role: Batter

International information
- National side: New Zealand
- T20I debut (cap 54): 6 February 2019 v India
- Last T20I: 8 February 2019 v India

Domestic team information
- Years: Team
- 2014/15–present: Northern Districts

Career statistics
Competition	WT20I
Matches	2
Runs scored	19
Batting average	9.50
100s/50s	0/0
Top score	15
Catches/stumpings	0/–
- Source: Cricinfo, 8 April 2021

Caitlin Ann Gurrey (born 3 May 1995) is a New Zealand cricketer. In January 2019, she was named in New Zealand's squad for their series against India. She made her Women's Twenty20 International cricket (WT20I) debut for New Zealand against India on 6 February 2019.

On 16 December 2022, Gurrey equalled Suzie Bates' record for the highest score in New Zealand women's domestic one day cricket, scoring 183 off of 145 balls against Central Districts.
