= Kate Anderson (cricketer) =

New Zealand cricketer (born 1996)

Personal information
- Full name: Kate Georgia Anderson
- Born: 6 May 1996 (age 30); Invercargill, New Zealand
- Batting: Right-handed
- Bowling: Right-arm off break
- Role: All-rounder

International information
- National side: New Zealand
- T20I debut (cap 65): 8 October 2023 v South Africa
- Last T20I: 3 December 2023 v Pakistan

Domestic team information
- Years: Team
- 2014/15–2021/22: Northern Districts
- 2022/23–present: Canterbury

Career statistics
Competition	WT20I
Matches	4
Runs scored	62
Batting average	15.50
100s/50s	0/0
Top score	25
Catches/stumpings	0/–
- Source: Cricinfo, 15 October 2024

Kate Georgia Anderson (born 6 May 1996) is a New Zealand cricketer who as of March 2024 plays for Canterbury.

Anderson played for Northern Districts from the 2014/15 to the 2021/22 seasons.

In April 2021, Anderson earned her maiden call-up to the New Zealand women's cricket team, for their Women's One Day International (WODI) matches against Australia, after New Zealand's captain Sophie Devine was ruled out of the series.

She made her international debut in October 2023, in a Twenty20 International against South Africa. She played three matches in the series, scoring 55 runs.
