= Bay Oval =

Cricket ground in Mount Maunganui, Tauranga, New Zealand

- Blake Park
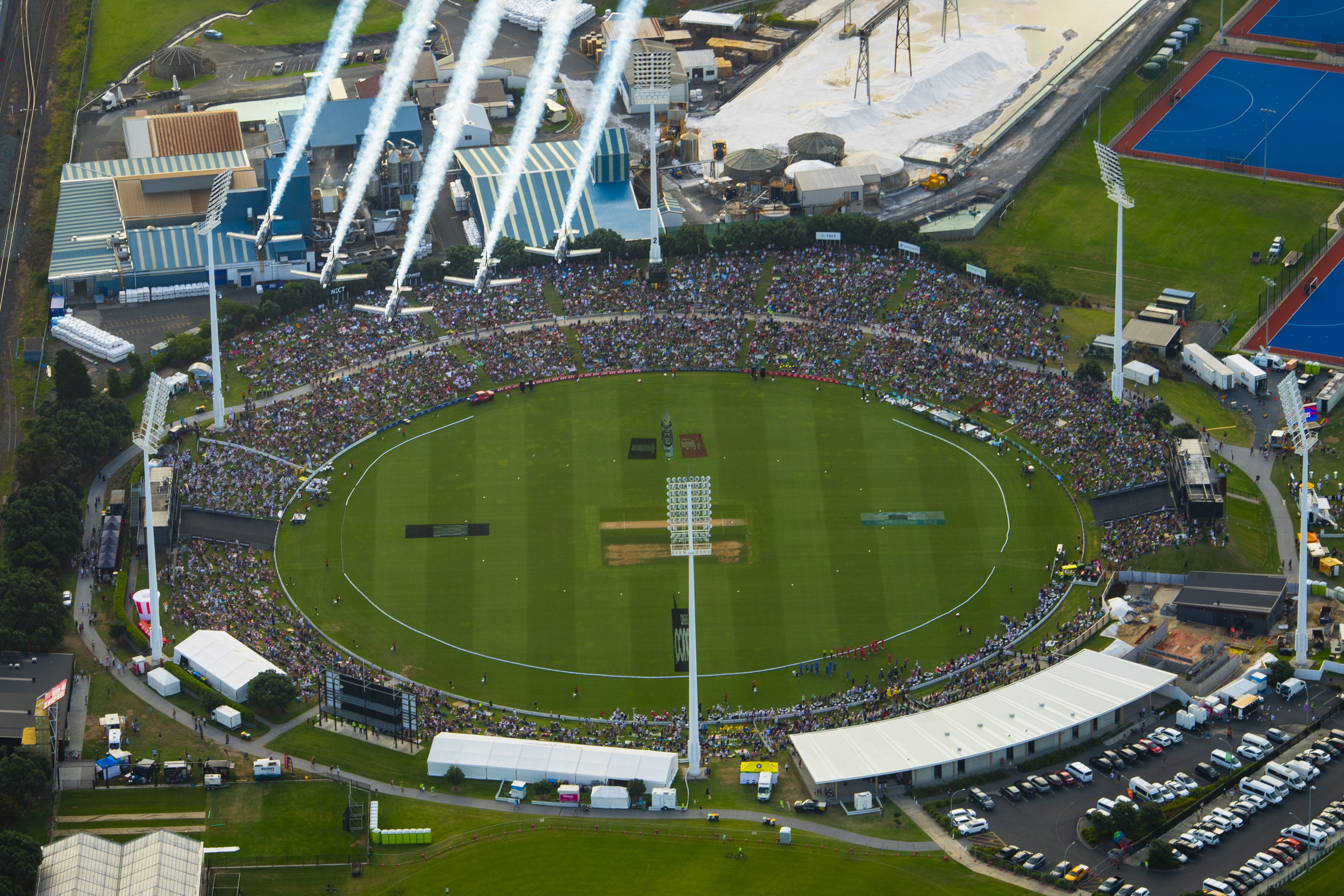
- Interactive map of Bay Oval

Ground information
- Location: Mount Maunganui, Tauranga, New Zealand
- Country: New Zealand
- Coordinates: 37°39′10″S 176°11′27″E
- Establishment: 2007 (first recorded match)
- Capacity: 10,000
- Website: bayoval.co.nz
- End names
- Mount End; Tauranga End

International information
- First men's Test: 21–25 November 2019: New Zealand v England
- Last men's Test: 4–7 February 2024: New Zealand v South Africa
- First men's ODI: 28 January 2014: Canada v Pakistan
- Last men's ODI: 5 April 2025: New Zealand v Pakistan
- First men's T20I: 7 January 2016: New Zealand v Sri Lanka
- Last men's T20I: 30 December 2024: New Zealand v Sri Lanka
- First women's ODI: 11 February 2015: New Zealand v England
- Last women's ODI: 18 March 2022: Bangladesh v West Indies
- First women's T20I: 8 March 2014: New Zealand v West Indies
- Last women's T20I: 2 February 2020: New Zealand v South Africa

Team information
Northern Districts Women	(2007/08–present)
Northern Districts	(2008/09–present)
- As of 5 January 2025; Source: ESPNcricinfo

Bay Oval is a cricket ground in Mount Maunganui, Tauranga in the Bay of Plenty area of New Zealand. The ground was built in Blake Park and opened in 2005.

Bay Oval has hosted men's and women's international limited overs matches since 2014. It hosted its first Test match in November 2019.

== History ==
Blake Park was established in the 1950s. It was used by Northern Districts for List A fixtures between the 1987/88 season and 2001/02, with the team playing 24 matches on the ground in the New Zealand limited-overs cricket trophy. During the 1980s and 90s, large holiday crowds flocked to the ground to watch one-day matches, and New Zealand A played two matches on the ground against Pakistan A in December 1998. Northern Districts Women played two matches at Blake Park in the 2004/05 State League.

The Bay of Plenty Cricket Association constructed Bay Oval within the same site, with construction beginning in 2005. Northern Districts women's team played their first match on the ground in December 2007 and it held its first senior men's match in the 2008–09 State Twenty20 with Northern Districts playing Otago. Both teams have played on the ground regularly since, with it hosting its first first-class cricket match in April 2015.

The first One Day International (ODI) on the ground took place in January 2014 between Canada and the Netherlands as part of the 2014 Cricket World Cup Qualifier. In March 2014 New Zealand women's team played their first ODI on the ground and in October of the same year it hosted the first two ODIs of the New Zealand men's home series against the touring South Africa, but was not used for the 2015 Cricket World Cup later in the season. It has been used as a limited overs venue by New Zealand's men's and women's teams since.

In November 2019, when England toured New Zealand, the first Test match was played on this ground which New Zealand won by an innings and 65 runs.

In December 2020, the Bay Oval hosted its first Boxing Day test between New Zealand and Pakistan, where the home team defeated Pakistan by 101 runs.

In January 2022, during the first test match of Bangladesh's tour of New Zealand, Bangladesh defeated New Zealand by 8 wickets, their first win against New Zealand in New Zealand across all formats (in 33 matches) and their first test match win against New Zealand. It was also the first test match loss on home ground for New Zealand against an Asian team since 2011, when Pakistan beat the home team at Hamilton by ten wickets.

== Records ==
=== Cricket Records ===
==== Test records ====
- Highest Test Total: 615/9d – New Zealand vs. England, 21 November 2019
- Highest Individual Test Score: 240 – Rachin Ravindra, New Zealand vs. South Africa, 4 February 2024
- Best Test Innings Bowling Figures: 6/46 – Ebadot Hossain, Bangladesh vs. New Zealand, 1 January 2022
- Best Test Match Bowling Figures: 8/134 – Neil Wagner, New Zealand vs. England, 21 November 2019
- Highest Test Partnership: 261 (for the 7th wicket) – BJ Watling & Mitchell Santner, New Zealand vs. England, 21 November 2019

==== ODI records ====
- Highest ODI Total: 371/7 – New Zealand vs Sri Lanka, 3 January 2019
- Highest Individual ODI Score: 140 – Thisara Perera, Sri Lanka vs New Zealand, 5 January 2019
- Best ODI Innings Bowling Figures: 5/40 – Matt Henry, New Zealand vs Sri Lanka, 5 January 2016
- Highest ODI Partnership: 163 (for the 2nd wicket) – Martin Guptill & Kane Williamson, New Zealand vs Sri Lanka, 3 January 2019

==== Twenty20 International records ====
- Highest Twenty20 Total: 243/5 – New Zealand vs West Indies, 3 January 2018
- Highest Individual Twenty20 Score: 111* (51) – Suryakumar Yadav, India vs New Zealand, 20 November 2022
- Best Twenty20 Innings Bowling Figures: 4/10 – Deepak Hooda, India vs. New Zealand, 20 November 2022
- Highest Twenty20 Partnership: 184 (for the 3rd wicket) – Devon Conway & Glenn Phillips, New Zealand vs West Indies, 29 November 2020

== See also ==
- List of Test cricket grounds
