= 2025–26 Super Smash (women's cricket) =

Cricket tournament

2025–26 Women's Super Smash
- Dates: 26 December 2025 – 31 January 2026
- Administrator: New Zealand Cricket
- Cricket format: Twenty20
- Tournament format(s): Double round-robin and Finals
- Champions: Wellington Blaze (10th title)
- Runners-up: Auckland Hearts
- Participants: 6
- Matches: 32
- Most runs: Brooke Halliday (300)
- Most wickets: Molly Penfold (17)
- Official website: Super Smash

The 2025–26 Super Smash was the 19th season of the women's Super Smash Twenty20 cricket competition played in New Zealand. The tournament took place from 26 December 2025 to 31 January 2026. Wellington Blaze were the defending champions.

The tournament will run alongside the 2025–26 Men's Super Smash.

Wellington Blaze defend their title by defeating Auckland Hearts in the final by 5 wickets.

== Competition format ==
Teams play in a double round-robin in a group of six, playing 10 matches overall. Matches were played using a Twenty20 format. The top team in the group advanced straight to the final, while the second- and third-placed teams played in an elimination final.

The group works on a points system, with positions being based on the total points. Points are awarded as follows:

Result	Points
Win	4 Ponts
Tie / No Result	2 Points
Loss	0 Points
Bonus	1 Point (If the team scores 150 runs or more – regardless of whether they bat first or second – or for achieving a run rate greater than 1.25 times that of the opposition in the second innings. Each team can earn a maximum of one bonus point per match.)

== Teams and standings ==
=== Points table ===
Pos	Team	Pld	W	L	T	NR	BP	Pts	NRR	Qualification
1	Wellington Blaze	10	7	2	0	1	3	33	0.891	Advance to Grand Final
2	Northern Brave	10	5	3	0	2	4	28	0.702	Advance to Elimination Final
3	Auckland Hearts	10	5	4	0	1	3	25	0.316	Advance to Elimination Final
4	Central Hinds	10	5	4	0	1	3	25	−0.281	
5	Otago Sparks	10	4	5	0	1	4	22	0.247	
6	Canterbury Magicians	10	1	9	0	0	2	6	−1.820	

Source: Dream11 Super Smash, ESPNcricinfo

=== Points summary ===
Team	Group matches										Play-offs	
Team	1	2	3	4	5	6	7	8	9	10	EF	F
Auckland Hearts	2	2	6	10	15	16	20	20	20	25	W	L
Canterbury Magicians	0	0	1	1	2	2	2	6	6	6		
Central Hinds	0	0	4	10	15	19	23	25	25	25		
Northern Brave	2	2	6	11	12	12	17	19	23	28	L	
Otago Sparks	5	10	10	10	10	15	17	18	18	22		
Wellington Blaze	4	9	14	14	14	18	23	25	29	33	→	W

Win	Loss	Tie	No result	Eliminated

- Note: The total points at the end of each group match are listed.
- Note: Click on the points or results to see the match summary.

== League stage ==
Match 1
26 December 2025
18:20 (N)
Scorecard

Auckland Hearts; 8/1 (2.2 overs)	v	Northern Brave
Bella Armstrong 4* (6); Maddy Green 4* (6); Marama Downes 1/7 (1.2 overs)

No result
Seddon Park, Hamilton
Umpires: Chris Brown and Tina Semmens

- Northern Brave won the toss and elected to field.
- The match was reduced to 17 overs per side due to rain.
- Rain prevented any further play.
- Points: Auckland Hearts 2, Northern Brave 2

Match 2
27 December 2025
12:40
Scorecard

Wellington Blaze; 136/5 (20 overs)	v	Central Hinds; 118 (19.5 overs)
Georgia Plimmer 39 (29); Claudia Green 2/20 (4 overs)		Flora Devonshire 34 (28); Jessica Simmons 2/15 (2 overs)

Wellington Blaze won by 18 runs
Fitzherbert Park, Palmerston North
Umpires: Kim Cotton and Scott Oliver

- Wellington Blaze won the toss and elected to bat.
- Points: Wellington Blaze 4, Central Hinds 0

Match 3
28 December 2025
12:40
Scorecard

Canterbury Magicians; 145/6 (20 overs)	v	Otago Sparks; 146/4 (14.5 overs)
Izzy Sharp 65* (47); Emma Black 2/19 (4 overs)		Laura Harris 52 (17); Melissa Banks 2/23 (3 overs)

Otago Sparks won by 6 wickets
Molyneux Park, Alexandra
Umpires: James Blunt and Shaun Haig
Player of the match: Laura Harris (Otago Sparks)

- Otago Sparks won the toss and elected to field.
- Laura Harris (Otago Sparks) equaled the fastest half-century off 15 balls in Women's T20s.
- Points: Otago Sparks 5, Canterbury Magicians 0

Match 4
29 December 2025
12:40
Scorecard

Wellington Blaze; 184/2 (20 overs)	v	Auckland Hearts; 135 (19.5 overs)
Amelia Kerr 106* (61); Bree Illing 1/33 (4 overs); Amie Hucker 1/33 (4 overs)		Maddy Green 39 (26); Xara Jetly 3/21 (3.5 overs)

Wellington Blaze won by 49 runs
Basin Reserve, Wellington
Umpires: Cory Black and Tyron Davies
Player of the match: Amelia Kerr (Welliongton Blaze)

- Welliongton Blaze won the toss and elected to bat.
- Points: Welliongton Blaze 5, Auckland Hearts 0

Match 5
30 December 2025
12:40
Scorecard

Central Hinds; 116/8 (20 overs)	v	Otago Sparks; 117/3 (14.2 overs)
Rosemary Mair 33 (32); Louisa Kotkamp 3/24 (4 overs)		Caitlin Blakely 32* (28); Elizabeth Cohr 1/14 (1 over)

Otago Sparks won by 7 wickets
Molyneux Park, Alexandra
Umpires: James Blunt and Shaun Haig

- Central Hinds won the toss and elected to bat.
- Points: Otago Sparks 5, Cenral Hinds 0

Match 6
31 December 2025
12:40
Scorecard

Wellington Blaze; 154/5 (20 overs)	v	Northern Brave; 93/9 (20 overs)
Amelia Kerr 66 (55); Lucy Boucher 1/20 (4 overs)		Nensi Patel 28 (43); Ellyse Perry 3/11 (4 overs)

Wellington Blaze won by 61 runs
Bay Oval, Mount Maunganui
Umpires: Billy Bowden and Christelle High
Player of the match: Amelia Kerr (Wellington Blaze)

- Northern Brave won the toss and elected to field.
- Points: Wellington Blaze 5, Northern Brave 0

Match 7
1 January 2026
14:10
Scorecard

Canterbury Magicians; 69/6 (5 overs)	v	Central Hinds; 72/3 (4.2 overs)
Jodie Dean 20 (11); Rosemary Mair 1/8 (1 over)		Bryony Smith 36 (12); Melissa Banks 1/11 (1 over)

Central Hinds won by 7 wickets (DLS method)
Hagley Oval, Christchurch
Umpires: Kannan Jagannathan and Alyson Shipley
Player of the match: Rosemary Mair (Central Hinds)

- Central Hinds won the toss and elected to field.
- The match was reduced to 5 overs per side due to rain.
- Points: Central Hinds 4, Canterbury Magicians 0

Match 8
2 January 2026
12:40
Scorecard

Wellington Blaze; 112/7 (20 overs)	v	Auckland Hearts; 115/5 (18.5 overs)
Georgia Plimmer 36 (34); Josie Penfold 2/17 (3 overs)		Maddy Green 53 (45); Xara Jetly 2/14 (4 overs)

Auckland Hearts won by 5 wickets
Eden Park Outer Oval, Auckland
Umpires: James Birchall and Chris Brown

- Auckland Hearts won the toss and elected to field.
- Points: Auckland Hearts 4, Wellington Blaze 0

Match 9
3 January 2026
12:40
Scorecard

Central Hinds; 191/5 (20 overs)	v	Canterbury Magicians; 184/8 (20 overs)
Bryony Smith 45 (25); Gabby Sullivan 2/53 (4 overs)		Izzy Sharp 61 (38); Grace Scrivens 3/28 (4 overs)

Central Hinds won by 7 runs
Saxton Oval, Nelson
Umpires: John Dempsey and David James Henderson
Player of the match: Grace Scrivens (Central Hinds)

- Central Hinds won the toss and elected to bat.
- Points: Central Hinds 6, Canterbury Magicians 1

Match 10
4 January 2026
14:10
Scorecard

Northern Brave; 138 (19.4 overs)	v	Otago Sparks; 114 (18.5 overs)
Nensi Patel 36 (31); Poppy Jay Watkins 2/12 (4 overs)		Olivia Gain 36 (25); Lucy Boucher 4/16 (4 overs)

Northern Brave won by 24 runs
Bay Oval, Mount Maunganui
Umpires: Billy Bowden and Brendon Davis
Player of the match: Lucy Boucher (Northern Brave)

- Northern Brave won the toss and elected to bat.
- Points: Northern Brave 4, Otago Sparks 0

Match 11
6 January 2026
16:50 (D/N)
Scorecard

Auckland Hearts; 123/6 (20 overs)	v	Otago Sparks; 122/8 (20 overs)
Maddy Green 42 (41); Emma Black 2/20 (4 overs)		Bella James 40 (35); Molly Penfold 3/15 (2 overs)

Auckland Hearts won by 1 run
Eden Park Outer Oval, Auckland
Umpires: John Dempsey and Brad Wilson
Player of the match: Molly Penfold (Auckland Hearts)

- Auckland Hearts won the toss and elected to bat.
- Points: Auckland Hearts 4, Otago Sparks 0

Match 12
7 January 2026
12:40
Scorecard

Central Hinds; 154/6 (20 overs)	v	Wellington Blaze; 149/5 (20 overs)
Bryony Smith 56 (36); Jess Kerr 1/22 (4 overs)		Rebecca Burns 56 (52); Grace Scrivens 2/23 (4 overs)

Central Hinds won by 5 runs
Basin Reserve, Wellington
Umpires: Kim Cotton and Neil Louw
Player of the match: Bryony Smith (Central Hinds)
Grace Scrivens (Central Hinds)

- Central Hinds won the toss and elected to bat.
- Points: Central Hinds 5, Wellington Blaze 0

Match 13
8 January 2026
18:20 (N)
Scorecard

Northern Brave; 171/7 (20 overs)	v	Canterbury Magicians; 66 (14.5 overs)
Tash Wakelin 86 (52); Melissa Banks 2/29 (4 overs)		Darcy Prasad 17 (24); Marama Downes 4/11 (3.5 overs)

Northern Brave won by 105 runs
Seddon Park, Hamilton
Umpires: Billy Bowden and Vincent Calabro
Player of the match: Tash Wakelin (Northern Brave)

- Canterbury Magicians won the toss and elected to field.
- Points: Northern Brave 5, Canterbury Magicians 0

Match 14
9 January 2026
12:40
Scorecard

Otago Sparks; 143/7 (20 overs)	v	Wellington Blaze; 147/4 (19.2 overs)
Caitlin Blakely 36 (36); Nicole Baird 2/17 (2 overs)		Maitlan Brown 44* (25); Eva Gray 2/35 (3.2 overs)

Wellington Blaze won by 6 wickets
Basin Reserve, Wellington
Umpires: Chris Brown and Regan Combe
Player of the match: Maitlan Brown (Wellington Blaze)

- Points: Wellington Blaze 4, Otago Sparks 0

Match 15
10 January 2026
14:10
Scorecard

Auckland Hearts; 171/6 (20 overs)	v	Canterbury Magicians; 91 (19.4 overs)
Brooke Halliday 62 (47); Abigail Hotton 2/35 (4 overs)		Izzy Sharp 42 (39); Molly Penfold 3/20 (4 overs)

Auckland Hearts won by 80 runs
Hagley Oval, Christchurch
Umpires: Regan Dalley and John Dempsey
Player of the match: Brooke Halliday (Auckland Hearts)

- Canterbury Magicians won the toss and elected to field.
- Points: Auckland Hearts 5, Canterbury Magicians 1

Match 16
11 January 2026
12:40
Scorecard

Wellington Blaze; 165/6 (20 overs)	v	Northern Brave; 162/8 (20 overs)
Jess Kerr 53 (31); Nensi Patel 2/28 (4 overs)		Eve Wolland 70 (48); Xara Jetly 3/40 (4 overs)

Wellington Blaze won by 3 runs
Basin Reserve, Wellington
Umpires: Regan Combe and Kannan Jagannathan

- Wellington Blaze won the toss and elected to bat.
- Points: Wellington Blaze 5, Northern Brave 1

Match 17
12 January 2026
12:40
Scorecard

Auckland Hearts; 168/5 (20 overs)	v	Otago Sparks; 169/6 (18.2 overs)
Brooke Halliday 58* (43); Louisa Kotkamp 2/22 (4 overs)		Poppy Jay Watkins 50 (36); Josie Penfold 4/29 (4 overs)

Otago Sparks won by 4 wickets
University of Otago Oval, Dunedin
Umpires: Greg Pennell and Tina Semmens
Player of the match: Eva Gray (Otago Sparks)
Anna Browning (Otago Sparks)

- Otago Sparks won the toss and elected to field.
- Points: Otago Sparks 5, Auckland Hearts 1

Match 18
13 January 2026
14:10
Scorecard

Northern Brave; 82 (17.4 overs)	v	Central Hinds; 83/7 (18.2 overs)
Eve Wolland 24 (31); Rosemary Mair 4/11 (2.4 overs)		Hannah Rowe 23* (38); Marama Downes 3/10 (4 overs)

Central Hinds won by 3 wickets
McLean Park, Napier
Umpires: Billy Bowden and Regan Dalley
Player of the match: Rosemary Mair (Central Hinds)

- Northern Brave won the toss and elected to bat.
- Points: Central Hinds 4, Northern Brave 0

Match 19
14 January 2026
16:50 (D/N)
Scorecard

Canterbury Magicians; 93 (18 overs)	v	Auckland Hearts; 94/3 (15.4 overs)
Lea Tahuhu 26 (25); Maddy Green 3/16 (4 overs)		Prue Catton 42* (47); Melissa Banks 1/15 (3.4 overs)

Auckland Hearts won by 7 wickets
Eden Park Outer Oval, Auckland
Umpires: Wayne Knights and Vinit Mahna
Player of the match: Prue Catton (Auckland Hearts)

- Auckland Hearts won the toss and elected to field.
- The match was reduced to 18 overs per side due to rain.
- Points: Auckland Hearts 4, Canterbury Magicians 0

Match 20
15 January 2026
12:40
Scorecard

Wellington Blaze; 143/7 (20 overs)	v	Otago Sparks; 25/0 (4 overs)
Jess Kerr 39 (24); Emma Black 3/31 (4 overs)		Bella James 17* (12)

No result
University of Otago Oval, Dunedin
Umpires: Kim Cotton and Greg Pennell

- Wellington Blaze won the toss and elected to bat.
- No further play was possible due to rain.
- Points: Wellington Blaze 2, Otago Sparks 2

Match 21
16 January 2026
14:10
Scorecard

Central Hinds; 136/4 (20 overs)	v	Auckland Hearts; 107 (19.3 overs)
Emma McLeod 53* (44); Amie Hucker 1/18 (3 overs)		Maddy Green 35 (37); Grace Scrivens 4/13 (4 overs)

Central Hinds won by 29 runs
McLean Park, Napier
Umpires: Regan Combe and Chris Brown
Player of the match: Grace Scrivens (Central Hinds)

- Auckland Hearts won the toss and elected to field.
- Points: Central Hinds 4, Auckland Hearts 0

Match 22
18 January 2026
12:40
Scorecard

Otago Sparks; 161/6 (20 overs)	v	Northern Brave; 162/5 (19.3 overs)
Felicity Leydon-Davis 49 (45); Jess Watkin 2/28 (4 overs)		Caitlin Gurrey 64* (39); Poppy Jay Watkins 2/14 (3 overs)

Northern Brave won by 5 wickets
University of Otago Oval, Dunedin
Umpires: Kannan Jagannathan and Alyson Shipley
Player of the match: Jess Watkin (Northern Brave)

- Otago Sparks won the toss and elected to field.
- Points: Northern Brave 5, Otago Sparks 1

Match 23
19 January 2026
12:40
Scorecard

Wellington Blaze; 127 (19.5 overs)	v	Canterbury Magicians; 97 (18 overs)
Georgia Plimmer 36 (33); Melissa Banks 2/20 (4 overs)		Kate Anderson 45 (42); Jess Kerr 4/18 (4 overs)

Wellington Blaze won by 30 runs
Basin Reserve, Wellington
Umpires: Kim Cotton and Christelle High
Player of the match: Georgia Plimmer (Wellington Blaze)

- Canterbury Magicians won the toss and elected to field.
- Points: Wellington Blaze 4, Canterbury Magicians 0

Match 24
20 January 2026
14:10
Scorecard

Northern Brave	v	Central Hinds

Match abandoned
Seddon Park, Hamilton

- No toss.
- Points: Northern Brave 2, Central Hinds 2

Match 25
21 January 2026
14:10
Scorecard

Otago Sparks; 141/7 (20 overs)	v	Canterbury Magicians; 145/1 (17.5 overs0
Eva Gray 28 (21); Melissa Banks 3/32 (4 overs)		Kate Anderson 66* (49); Chloe Deerness 1/21 (2 overs)

Canterbury Magicians won by 9 wickets
Hagley Oval, Christchurch
Umpires: Kim Cotton and Christelle High
Player of the match: Kate Anderson (Canterbury Magicians)

- Canterbury Magicians won the toss and elected to field.
- Points: Canterbury Magicians 4, Otago Sparks 0

Match 26
22 January 2026
12:40
Scorecard

Auckland Hearts; 103/4 (18 overs)	v	Northern Brave; 104/9 (17.4 over)
Izzy Gaze 51 (44); Kayley Knight 2/21 (4 overs)		Caitlin Gurrey 19 (13); Bella Armstrong 3/19 (4 overs)

Northern Brave won by 1 wicket
Eden Park Outer Oval, Auckland
Umpires: James Birchall and Chris Brown
Player of the match: Kayley Knight (Northern Brave)

- Northern Brave won the toss and elected to field.
- The match was reduced to 18 overs per side due to rain.
- Points: Northern Brave 4, Auckland Hearts 0

Match 27
23 January 2026
14:10
Scorecard

Wellington Blaze; 130/9 (20 overs)	v	Canterbury Magicians; 124/7 (20 overs)
Rebecca Burns 32 (26); Sarah Asmussen 3/19 (4 overs)		Kate Anderson 35 (41); Hannah Francis 3/18 (4 overs)

Wellington Blaze won by 6 runs
Hagley Oval, Christchurch
Umpires: John Dempsey and Kannan Jagannathan
Player of the match: Hannah Francis (Wellington Blaze)

- Canterbury Magicians won the toss and elected to field.
- Points: Wellington Blaze 4, Canterbury Magicians 0

Match 28
24 January 2026
14:10
Scorecard

Central Hinds; 123/5 (20 overs)	v	Otago Sparks; 126/8 (19.3 overs)
Grace Scrivens 55 (49); Anna Browning 1/11 (2 overs)		Polly Inglis 41 (22); Ashtuti Kumar 3/12 (3 overs)

Otago Sparks won by 2 wickets
McLean Park, Napier
Umpires: Greg Pennell and Scott Oliver
Player of the match: Polly Inglis (Otago Sparks)

- Central Hinds won the toss and elected to bat.
- Points: Otago Sparks 4, Central Hinds 0

Match 29
25 January 2026
12:40
Scorecard

Northern Brave; 157/7(18 overs)	v	Canterbury Magicians; 103/8 (18 overs)
Nensi Patel 57 (43); Lauren Smith 3/23 (4 overs)		Melissa Banks 38* (28); Nensi Patel 2/11 (2 overs)

Northern Brave won by 48 runs
Hagley Oval, Christchurch
Umpires: Billy Bowden and Regan Dalley
Player of the match: Nensi Patel (Northern Brave)

- Canterbury Magicians won the toss and elected to field.
- The match was reduced to 18 overs per side due to rain.
- Points: Northern Brave 5, Canterbury Magicians 0

Match 30
26 January 2026
12:40
Scorecard

Central Hinds; 125/4 (20 overs)	v	Auckland Hearts; 123/2 (13.5 overs)
Emma McLeod 39* (34); Bella Armstrong 2/23 (3 overs)		Izzy Gaze 59 (39); Flora Devonshire 1/9 (1 over)

Auckland Hearts won by 8 wickets (DLS method)
Eden Park Outer Oval, Auckland
Player of the match: Izzy Gaze (Auckland Hearts)

- Auckland Hearts won the toss and elected to field.
- Second innings was reduced to 19 overs due to rain.
- Auckland Hearts were set a revised target of 120 runs from 19 overs due to rain.
- Points: Auckland Hearts 5, Central Hinds 0

== Finals ==
Elimination Final			Grand Final
			1	Wellington Blaze	149/5 (19.5 overs)
2	Northern Brave		EW	Auckland Hearts	146/5 (20 overs)
3	Auckland Hearts	139/2 (19.4 overs)

=== Elimination Final ===
Elimination Final
30 January 2026
14:10
Scorecard

Northern Brave; 138 (19.5 overs)	v	Auckland Hearts; 139/2 (19.1 overs)
Nensi Patel 46 (43); Maddy Green 4/21 (4 overs)		Prue Cotton 56* (57); Nensi Patel 1/19 (3 overs)

Auckland Hearts won by 8 wickets
Hagley Oval, Christchurch
Umpires: Billy Bowden and Kim Cotton
Player of the match: Maddy Green (Auckland Hearts)

- Northern Brave won the toss and elected to bat.

=== Grand Final ===
Grand Final
31 January 2026
14:10
Scorecard

Auckland Hearts; 146/5 (20 overs)	v	Wellington Blaze; 149/5 (19.5 overs)
Izzy Gaze 31 (22); Xara Jetly 2/27 (4 overs)		Rebecca Burns 55 (41); Molly Penfold 2/14 (4 overs)

Wellington Blaze won by 5 wickets
Hagley Oval, Christchurch
Umpires: Billy Bowden and Kim Cotton
Player of the match: Jess Kerr (Wellington Blaze)

- Auckland Hearts won the toss and elected to bat.
