= Zimbabwe women's cricket team in New Zealand in 2025–26 =

International cricket tour

	New Zealand	Zimbabwe
- Dates: 25 February – 11 March 2026
Captains	Amelia Kerr	Nomvelo Sibanda

One Day International series
- Results: New Zealand won the 3-match series 3–0
Most runs	Brooke Halliday (204)	Chipo Mugeri-Tiripano (64); Kelis Ndhlovu (64)
Most wickets	Amelia Kerr (16)	Christabel Chatonzwa (4)
- Player of the series: Amelia Kerr (NZ)

Twenty20 International series
- Results: New Zealand won the 3-match series 3–0
Most runs	Isabella Gaze (189)	Beloved Biza (53)
Most wickets	Jess Kerr (5); Nensi Patel (5)	Nyasha Gwanzura (2)
- Player of the series: Amelia Kerr (NZ)

The Zimbabwe women's cricket team toured New Zealand in February and March 2026 to play the New Zealand women's cricket team. The tour consisted of three One Day International (ODI) and three Twenty20 International (T20I) matches. The ODI series formed part of the 2025–2029 ICC Women's Championship. It is the first ever bilateral series between the two sides. In June 2025, the New Zealand Cricket (NZC) confirmed the fixtures for the tour, as a part of the 2025–26 home international season.

== Squads ==
New Zealand		Zimbabwe
ODIs	T20Is	ODIs and T20Is
Amelia Kerr (c); ~~Flora Devonshire~~; Izzy Gaze (wk); Maddy Green; Brooke Halliday; Bree Illing; Polly Inglis (wk); Bella James; Jess Kerr; Emma McLeod; Rosemary Mair; Nensi Patel; Molly Penfold; ~~Georgia Plimmer~~; Izzy Sharp (wk)	Amelia Kerr (c); ~~Flora Devonshire~~; Izzy Gaze (wk); Maddy Green; Brooke Halliday; Bree Illing; Polly Inglis (wk); Bella James; Jess Kerr; Kayley Knight; Rosemary Mair; Nensi Patel; Molly Penfold; Georgia Plimmer; Izzy Sharp (wk)	Nomvelo Sibanda (c); Beloved Biza; Christabel Chatonzwa; Chiedza Dhururu (wk); Nyasha Gwanzura; Tendai Makusha; Precious Marange; Audrey Mazvishaya; Chipo Mugeri-Tiripano; Modester Mupachikwa (wk); Kelis Ndhlovu; Josephine Nkomo; Loryn Phiri; Loreen Tshuma; Adel Zimunu

On 22 February, Flora Devonshire was ruled out of the series due to broken left finger and was replaced by Molly Penfold in T20Is and Polly Inglis in ODIs. On 27 February, Georgia Plimmer was ruled out of the remainder of T20I series due to shoulder injury and was replaced by Bella James. On 3 March, Plimmer was ruled out of the ODI series and was replaced by Bella James.

On 10 March, Kelis Ndhlovu was ruled out of the third and final ODI due to suffering from concussion during the second ODI in Dunedin.

== T20I series ==
=== 1st T20I ===
25 February 2026
19:15 (N)
Scorecard

New Zealand; 202/1 (20 overs)	v	Zimbabwe; 110/4 (20 overs)
Amelia Kerr 101* (51); Nyasha Gwanzura 1/37 (3 overs)		Beloved Biza 49* (55); Amelia Kerr 2/14 (4 overs)

New Zealand won by 92 runs
Seddon Park, Hamilton
Umpires: Shaun Haig (NZ) and Sue Redfern (Eng)
Player of the match: Amelia Kerr (NZ)

- Zimbabwe won the toss and elected to field.
- Nensi Patel (NZ) made her T20I debut.
- Amelia Kerr (NZ) scored her maiden century and scored her 1,500th run in T20Is.
- Georgia Plimmer (NZ) scored her 1,000th run in international cricket.

=== 2nd T20I ===
27 February 2026
19:15 (N)
Scorecard

New Zealand; 196/1 (20 overs)	v	Zimbabwe; 86 (18.3 overs)
Izzy Gaze 85* (54); Nyasha Gwanzura 1/40 (4 overs)		Chiedza Dhururu 20 (13); Nensi Patel 2/11 (4 overs)

New Zealand won by 110 runs
Seddon Park, Hamilton
Umpires: Cory Black (NZ) and Sue Redfern (Eng)
Player of the match: Izzy Gaze (NZ)

- New Zealand won the toss and elected to bat.
- Kayley Knight (NZ) made her T20I debut.

=== 3rd T20I ===
1 March 2026
13:15
Scorecard

Zimbabwe; 64/9 (20 overs)	v	New Zealand; 65/0 (5.4 overs)
Adel Zimunu 20 (23); Nensi Patel 3/8 (4 overs)		Izzy Gaze 38* (20)

New Zealand won by 10 wickets
Seddon Park, Hamilton
Umpires: Sue Redfern (Eng) and Tina Semmens (NZ)
Player of the match: Nensi Patel (NZ)

- Zimbabwe won the toss and elected to bat.

== ODI series ==
=== 1st ODI ===
5 March 2026
11:00
Scorecard

New Zealand; 354/3 (50 overs)	v	Zimbabwe; 174 (47.3 overs)
Brooke Halliday 157* (118); Precious Marange 1/52 (10 overs)		Kelis Ndhlovu 52 (109); Amelia Kerr 4/35 (10 overs)

New Zealand won by 180 runs
University of Otago Oval, Dunedin
Umpires: Kim Cotton (NZ) and Sue Redfern (Eng)
Player of the match: Brooke Halliday (NZ)

- Zimbabwe won the toss and elected to field.
- Nensi Patel and Izzy Sharp (NZ) both made their ODI debuts.
- Brooke Halliday (NZ) scored her maiden century in ODIs.
- Women's Championship points: New Zealand 2, Zimbabwe 0.

=== 2nd ODI ===
8 March 2026
11:00
Scorecard

Zimbabwe; 102 (29.1 overs)	v	New Zealand; 106/2 (16.2 overs)
Modester Mupachikwa 32 (51); Amelia Kerr 7/34 (9.1 overs)		Amelia Kerr 45 (40); Christabel Chatonzwa 1/13 (2 overs)

New Zealand won by 8 wickets
University of Otago Oval, Dunedin
Umpires: Kannan Jagannathan (NZ) and Sue Redfern (Eng)
Player of the match: Amelia Kerr (NZ)

- New Zealand won the toss and elected to field.
- Tendai Makusha replaced Kelis Ndhlovu as a concussion substitute for Zimbabwe during their first innings.
- Women's Championship points: New Zealand 2, Zimbabwe 0.

=== 3rd ODI ===
11 March 2026
11:00
Scorecard

New Zealand; 303/6 (50 overs)	v	Zimbabwe; 103 (27.1 overs)
Maddy Green 94 (73); Christabel Chatonzwa 2/48 (9 overs)		Loreen Tshuma 34 (41); Amelia Kerr 5/22 (3.1 overs)

New Zealand won by 200 runs
University of Otago Oval, Dunedin
Umpires: Sue Redfern (Eng) and Tina Semmens (NZ)
Player of the match: Amelia Kerr (NZ)

- New Zealand won the toss and elected to bat.
- Amelia Kerr (NZ) took her maiden hat-trick in ODIs.
- Women's Championship points: New Zealand 2, Zimbabwe 0.
