= New Zealand women's cricket team in Australia in 2026–27 =

International cricket tour

	Australia	New Zealand
- Dates: 18 October 2026 – 10 March 2027
Captains	Sophie Molineux	Amelia Kerr

One Day International series

Twenty20 International series
- Results: Australia won the 3-match series 2–0
Most runs	Ashleigh Gardner (107)	Georgia Plimmer (93)
Most wickets	Georgia Wareham (3); Kim Garth (3)	Jess Kerr (5)
- Player of the series: Ashleigh Gardner (Aus)

The New Zealand women's cricket team toured Australia in October 2026 to play three Twenty20 International (WT20I) matches with the Australia women's cricket team. In March 2026, Cricket Australia (CA) confirmed the fixtures for the tour, as a part of the 2026–27 home international season. They will return in March 2027 to play three One Day International (ODI) matches. The ODI series will form part of the 2025–2029 ICC Women's Championship.

Originally, the WT20I series was scheduled to be played in February 2027. In June 2026, following the rescheduling of the 2027 Women's Champions Trophy from June to February 2027, the series was rescheduled to October 2026.

== Squads ==
Australia		New Zealand	
ODIs	T20Is	ODIs	T20Is
	Sophie Molineux (c); Ashleigh Gardner (vc); Tahlia McGrath (vc); Nicola Carey; Kim Garth; Lucy Hamilton; Alana King; Phoebe Litchfield; Beth Mooney (wk); Ellyse Perry; Megan Schutt; Annabel Sutherland; Georgia Voll; Georgia Wareham		Amelia Kerr (c); Eden Carson; Flora Devonshire; Maddy Green; Brooke Halliday; Bree Illing; Polly Inglis (wk); Bella James; Jess Kerr; Rosemary Mair; Nensi Patel; Molly Penfold; Georgia Plimmer; Hannah Rowe; Izzy Sharp (wk)

== T20I series ==
=== 1st T20I ===
18 October 2026
19:15 (N)
Scorecard

New Zealand; 2/162 (20 overs)	v	Australia; 8/168 (18.5 overs)
Georgia Plimmer 85* (68); Annabel Sutherland 1/28 (4 overs)		Ellyse Perry 52 (30); Jess Kerr 3/25 (4 overs)

Australia won by 2 wickets
North Sydney Oval, Sydney
Umpires: Claire Polosak (Aus) and Eloise Sheridan (Aus)
Player of the match: Georgia Plimmer (New Zealand)

- Australia won the toss and elected to field.

=== 2nd T20I ===
20 October 2026
19:15 (N)
Scorecard

Australia; 7/167 (20 overs)	v	New Zealand; 8/127 (20 overs)
Ashleigh Gardner 84 (45); Nensi Patel 2/30 (4 overs)		Amelia Kerr 32 (38); Georgia Wareham 3/18 (4 overs)

Australia won by 40 runs
North Sydney Oval, Sydney
Umpires: Lauren Agenbag (SA) and Claire Polosak (Aus)
Player of the match: Ashleigh Gardner (Aus)

- New Zealand won the toss and elected to field.

=== 3rd T20I ===
22 October 2026
19:15 (N)
Scorecard

New Zealand; 2/11 (2.4 overs)	v	Australia
Izzy Sharp 4* (2); Kim Garth 1/1 (1.4 overs)

No result
North Sydney Oval, Sydney
Umpires: Lauren Agenbag (SA) and Eloise Sheridan (Aus)

- Australia won the toss and elected to field.
- The match was reduced to 14 overs per side due to rain.
- Rain prevented any further play.

== ODI series ==
=== 1st ODI ===
6 March 2027
14:50 (D/N)
Scorecard

Australia	v	New Zealand

Manuka Oval, Canberra

=== 2nd ODI ===
8 March 2027
14:50 (D/N)
Scorecard

Australia	v	New Zealand

Junction Oval, Melbourne

=== 3rd ODI ===
10 March 2027
10:05
Scorecard

Australia	v	New Zealand

Junction Oval, Melbourne
