= 2023 ICC Under-19 Women's T20 World Cup squads =

List of cricket squads

The 2023 ICC Under-19 Women's T20 World Cup took place in South Africa in January 2023. Sixteen teams took part in the tournament, with their squads listed below. Players aged 18 or younger on 31 August 2022 were eligible for selection.

== Australia ==
Australia's squad was announced on 13 December 2022. Chloe Ainsworth and Jade Allen were ruled out of the tournament after the first round of matches due to injury, and were replaced by Paris Hall and Ananaya Sharma, who were both initially named as non-travelling reserves.

- Chloe Ainsworth
- Jade Allen
- Charis Bekker
- Paris Bowdler (wk)
- Maggie Clark
- Sianna Ginger
- Paris Hall (wk)
- Lucy Hamilton
- Ella Hayward
- Milly Illingworth
- Eleanor Larosa
- Rhys McKenna (c)
- Claire Moore
- Kate Pelle (wk)
- Ananaya Sharma
- Amy Smith
- Ella Wilson

Samira Dimeglio, Sara Kennedy and Olivia Henry were all named as non-travelling reserves.

== Bangladesh ==
Bangladesh's squad was announced in December 2022.

- Afia Humaira Anam Prottasha
- Asrafi Yeasmin Arthy
- Dilara Akter (wk)
- Disha Biswas (c)
- Jannatul Maoua
- Leky Chakma
- Marufa Akter
- Misty Rany Saha
- Mst Dipa Khatun
- Mst Eva
- Mst Unnoti Akter
- Rabeya Khan
- Reya Akter Shika
- Shorna Akter
- Sumaiya Akter

Suborna Kormakar, Nishita Akter Nishi, Mst Rabaya Khatun and Juairiya Ferdous were all named as reserves.

== England ==
England's squad was announced on 18 October 2022.

- Ellie Anderson
- Hannah Baker
- Josie Groves
- Liberty Heap
- Niamh Holland
- Ryana MacDonald-Gay
- Emma Marlow
- Charis Pavely
- Davina Perrin
- Lizzie Scott
- Grace Scrivens (c)
- Seren Smale (wk)
- Sophia Smale
- Alexa Stonehouse
- Maddie Ward (wk)

Emily Churms, Charlotte Lambert, Bethan Miles, Jemima Spence and Mary Taylor were all named as non-travelling reserves.

== India ==
India's squad was announced on 5 December 2022. Hurley Gala was ruled out of the tournament due to injury, and was replaced by Soppadhandi Yashasri.

- Hrishita Basu (wk)
- Parshavi Chopra
- Archana Devi
- Hurley Gala
- Richa Ghosh (wk)
- Mannat Kashyap
- Sonia Mehdiya
- Falak Naz
- Titas Sadhu
- Shweta Sehrawat
- Shabnam Shakil
- Soumya Tiwari
- Gongadi Trisha
- Shafali Verma (c)
- Sonam Yadav
- Soppadhandi Yashasri

Najla CMC and Shikha Shalot were all named as standby players.

== Indonesia ==
Indonesia's squad was announced on 3 January 2023.

- Desi Wulandari
- Dewa Ayu Sasrikayoni
- Gusti Ayu Ratna Ulansari
- I Gusti Pratiwi
- Kadek Ayu Kurniartini
- Lie Qiao
- Ni Kadek Ariani
- Ni Kadek Dwi Indriyani
- Ni Kadek Murtiari
- Ni Made Suarniasih
- Ni Putu Cantika
- Sang Ayu Puspita Dewi
- Thersiana Penu Weo
- Wesikaratna Dewi (c)
- Yessny Djahilepang

== Ireland ==
Ireland's squad was announced on 1 December 2022.

- Zara Craig
- Georgina Dempsey
- Rebecca Gough
- Abbi Harrison
- Amy Hunter (c, wk)
- Jennifer Jackson
- Joanna Loughran (wk)
- Niamh MacNulty
- Aimee Maguire
- Kia McCartney
- Ellie McGee
- Julie McNally
- Freya Sargent
- Annabel Squires
- Siúin Woods

Aoife Fisher and Alice Walsh were named as non-travelling reserves.

== New Zealand ==
New Zealand's squad was announced on 13 December 2022. Bree Illing later withdrew from the squad due to injury, being replaced by Louisa Kotkamp. Fran Jonas was ruled out of the tournament after the first round of matches due to injury, and was replaced by Kate Irwin. Antonia Hamilton was ruled out of the tournament during the Super Six stages due to injury, and was replaced by Emma Irwin.

- Olivia Anderson
- Anna Browning
- Kate Chandler
- Natasha Codyre
- Izzy Gaze (wk)
- Antonia Hamilton
- Abigail Hotton
- ~~Bree Illing~~
- Emma Irwin
- Kate Irwin
- Fran Jonas
- Kayley Knight
- Louisa Kotkamp
- Paige Loggenberg
- Emma McLeod
- Georgia Plimmer
- Izzy Sharp (c)
- Tash Wakelin

== Pakistan ==
Pakistan's squad was announced on 7 December 2022.

- Aliza Khan
- Anosha Nasir
- Areesha Noor
- Eyman Fatima
- Haleema Azeem Dar
- Haniah Ahmer
- Laiba Nasir
- Mahnoor Aftab
- Quratulain Ahsen
- Rida Aslam
- Shawaal Zulfiqar
- Syeda Aroob Shah (c)
- Warda Yousaf
- Zaib-un-Nisa
- Zamina Tahir (wk)

Aqsa Yousaf, Dina Razvi, Maham Anees, Muskan Abid and Tahzeeb Shah were all named as reserves.

== Rwanda ==
Rwanda's squad was announced on 18 December 2022.

- Gisele Ishimwe (c)
- Rosine Irera
- Divine Ishimwe
- Henriette Ishimwe
- Zurufat Ishimwe
- Henriette Isimbi (wk)
- Cesarie Muragajimana
- Belise Murekatete
- Shakila Niyomuhoza
- Marie Tumukunde
- Sylvia Usabyimana
- Geovanis Uwase
- Merveille Uwase (wk)
- Synthia Uwera
- Cynthia Tuyizere

== Scotland ==
Scotland's squad was announced on 12 December 2022. Molly Barbour-Smith later withdrew from the squad due to injury, being replaced by Kirsty McColl.

- ~~Molly Barbour-Smith~~
- Olivia Bell
- Darcey Carter
- Maryam Faisal
- Katherine Fraser (c)
- Ailsa Lister (wk)
- Maisie Maceira
- Kirsty McColl
- Orla Montgomery
- Niamh Muir
- Molly Paton
- Niamh Robertson-Jack
- Nayma Sheikh
- Anne Sturgess
- Emily Tucker
- Emma Walsingham

== South Africa ==
South Africa's squad was announced on 6 December 2022.

- Jemma Botha
- Jenna Evans
- Ayanda Hlubi
- Elandri Janse van Rensburg
- Madison Landsman
- Monalisa Legodi
- Simone Lourens
- Karabo Meso (wk)
- Refilwe Moncho
- Seshnie Naidu
- Nthabiseng Nini
- Kayla Reyneke
- Oluhle Siyo (c)
- Miané Smit
- Anica Swart

Diara Ramlakan and Caitlin Wyngaard were named as non-travelling reserves.

== Sri Lanka ==
Sri Lanka's squad was announced on 5 January 2023.

- Dulanga Dissanayake
- Vishmi Gunaratne (c)
- Manudi Nanayakkara
- Rashmi Nethranjalee
- Sumudu Nisansala
- Harini Perera
- Vidushika Perera
- Umaya Rathnayake
- Dahami Sanethma
- Rishmi Sanjana
- Nethmi Senarathne
- Rashmika Sewwandi
- Vihara Sewwandi
- Pamoda Shaini
- Dewmi Vihanga

== United Arab Emirates ==
The United Arab Emirates' squad was announced on 26 December 2022.

- Samaira Dharnidharka
- Mahika Gaur
- Siya Gokhale
- Geethika Jyothis
- Lavanya Keny
- Vaishnave Mahesh
- Induja Nandakumar
- Rinitha Rajith
- Rishitha Rajith
- Sanjana Ramesh
- Theertha Satish (c, wk)
- Sanchin Singh
- Avni Sunil Patil
- Archana Supriya
- Ishitha Zahra

== United States ==
The United States' squad was announced on 14 December 2022.

- Aditi Chudasama
- Anika Kolan (wk)
- Bhumika Bhadriraju
- Disha Dhingra
- Geetika Kodali (c)
- Isani Vaghela
- Jivana Aras
- Laasya Mullapudi
- Pooja Ganesh (wk)
- Pooja Shah
- Ritu Singh
- Sai Tanmayi Eyyunni
- Snigdha Paul
- Suhani Thadani
- Taranum Chopra

Chetnaa Prasad, Kasturi Vedantham, Lisa Ramjit, Mitali Patwardhan and Tya Gonsalves were all named as reserves.

== West Indies ==
The West Indies' squad was announced on 8 December 2022.

- Asabi Callendar
- Jahzara Claxton
- Naijanni Cumberbatch
- Earnisha Fontaine
- Jannillea Glasgow
- Realeanna Grimmond
- Trishan Holder
- Zaida James
- Djenaba Joseph
- KD Jazz Mitchell
- Ashmini Munisar (c)
- Shalini Samaroo
- Shunelle Sawh
- Lena Scott
- Abini St Jean

== Zimbabwe ==
Zimbabwe's squad was named on 29 December 2022.

- Olinda Chare
- Kudzai Chigora
- Betty Mangachena
- Tawananyasha Marumani
- Michelle Mavunga
- Danielle Meikle
- Chipo Moyo
- Natasha Mutomba
- Vimbai Mutungwindu
- Rukudzo Mwakayeni
- Faith Ndhlalambi
- Kelly Ndiraya
- Kelis Ndhlovu (c)
- Adel Zimunu
- Kay Ndiraya
