= New Zealand women's cricket team in Australia in 2024–25 =

International cricket tour

| | Australia | New Zealand |
- Dates: 19 – 24 September 2024
| Captains | Alyssa Healy | Sophie Devine (Note: Suzie Bates captained New Zealand in the first T20I.) |

Twenty20 International series
- Results: Australia won the 3-match series 3–0
| Most runs | Alyssa Healy (82) | Suzie Bates (86) |
| Most wickets | Ashleigh Gardner (4); Annabel Sutherland (4); Georgia Wareham (4) | Amelia Kerr (5) |
- Player of the series: Ashleigh Gardner (Aus)

The New Zealand women's cricket team toured Australia in September 2024 to play three Twenty20 International (T20I) matches against Australia women's cricket team. In March 2024, the Cricket Australia (CA) confirmed the fixtures for the tour, as a part of the 2024–25 home international season. The series formed part of both teams' preparation ahead of the 2024 ICC Women's T20 World Cup tournament.

Australia won the first T20I by five wickets, with Phoebe Litchfield scoring an unbeaten 64. Despite Amelia Kerr taking four wickets, the hosts won the second T20I by 29 runs, with Ashleigh Gardner taking three wickets in 4 overs. Australia won the third and last T20I by five wickets and won the series 3–0.

== Squads ==
| Australia | New Zealand |
|---|---|
| Alyssa Healy (c, wk); Tahlia McGrath (vc); Darcie Brown; Ashleigh Gardner; Kim Garth; Heather Graham; Grace Harris; Alana King; Phoebe Litchfield; Sophie Molineux; Beth Mooney (wk); Ellyse Perry; Megan Schutt; Annabel Sutherland; Georgia Wareham; Tayla Vlaeminck | Sophie Devine (c); Suzie Bates; Eden Carson; Izzy Gaze (wk); Maddy Green; Brooke Halliday; Fran Jonas; Leigh Kasperek; Jess Kerr; Amelia Kerr; Rosemary Mair; Molly Penfold; Georgia Plimmer; Hannah Rowe; Lea Tahuhu |

== T20I series ==
=== 1st T20I ===
19 September 2024
19:10 (N)
Scorecard

| New Zealand; 7/143 (20 overs) | v | Australia; 5/145 (18.4 overs) |
| Maddy Green 35 (33); Heather Graham 1/13 (2 overs) | | Phoebe Litchfield 64* (43); Molly Penfold 2/24 (4 overs) |

Australia won by 5 wickets
Great Barrier Reef Arena, Mackay
Umpires: Andrew Crozier (Aus) and Troy Penman (Aus)
Player of the match: Phoebe Litchfield (Aus)

- New Zealand won the toss and elected to bat.
- This was the first women's T20I match to be played at this venue.

=== 2nd T20I ===
22 September 2024
19:10 (N)
Scorecard

| Australia; 142 (19.3 overs) | v | New Zealand; 7/113 (20 overs) |
| Alyssa Healy 38 (25); Amelia Kerr 4/20 (4 overs) | | Suzie Bates 34 (34); Ashleigh Gardner 3/16 (4 overs) |

Australia won by 29 runs
Great Barrier Reef Arena, Mackay
Umpires: Andrew Crozier (Aus) and Ben Treloar (Aus)
Player of the match: Ashleigh Gardner (Aus)

- Australia won the toss and elected to bat.
- Beth Mooney (Aus) played in her 100th T20I match.

=== 3rd T20I ===
24 September 2024
19:10 (N)
Scorecard

| New Zealand; 6/146 (20 overs) | v | Australia; 5/148 (19.1 overs) |
| Georgia Plimmer 53 (48); Georgia Wareham 2/21 (4 overs) | | Ellyse Perry 36 (29); Eden Carson 2/29 (4 overs) |

Australia won by 5 wickets
Allan Border Field, Brisbane
Umpires: Troy Penman (Aus) and Ben Treloar (Aus)
Player of the match: Georgia Wareham (Aus)

- New Zealand won the toss and elected to bat.
- Maddy Green (NZ) played in her 100th T20I match.
