= Sri Lanka women's cricket team in New Zealand in 2024–25 =

International cricket tour

	New Zealand	Sri Lanka
- Dates: 4 – 18 March 2025
Captains	Suzie Bates	Chamari Athapaththu

One Day International series
- Results: New Zealand won the 3-match series 2–0
Most runs	Georgia Plimmer (140)	Harshitha Samarawickrama (133)
Most wickets	Eden Carson (4); Bree Illing (4); Jess Kerr (4); Hannah Rowe (4)	Chamari Athapaththu (3); Sugandika Kumari (3)
- Player of the series: Maddy Green (NZ)

Twenty20 International series
- Results: 3-match series drawn 1–1
Most runs	Suzie Bates (99)	Chamari Athapaththu (87)
Most wickets	Jess Kerr (4)	Inoshi Priyadharshani (4)
- Player of the series: Chamari Athapaththu (SL)

The Sri Lanka women's cricket team toured New Zealand in March 2025 to play the New Zealand women's cricket team. The tour consisted of three One Day International (ODI) and three Twenty20 International (T20I) matches. In July 2024, the New Zealand Cricket (NZC) confirmed the fixtures for the tour, as a part of the 2024–25 home international season.

== Squads ==
New Zealand		Sri Lanka
ODIs	T20Is	ODIs & T20Is
Suzie Bates (c); Emma Black (Note: In squad for 3rd ODI only.); Eden Carson; ~~Lauren Down~~; Izzy Gaze (wk); Maddy Green; Brooke Halliday; Bree Illing; Polly Inglis (wk); ~~Bella James (wk)~~; ~~Hayley Jensen~~; Fran Jonas; Jess Kerr; Emma McLeod; Georgia Plimmer; Hannah Rowe; Izzy Sharp (wk) (Note: In squad for 2nd and 3rd ODI only.)	Suzie Bates (c); Eden Carson; Flora Devonshire; ~~Izzy Gaze (wk)~~; Maddy Green; Brooke Halliday; Bree Illing; Polly Inglis (wk); ~~Bella James (wk)~~; ~~Hayley Jensen~~; Fran Jonas; Jess Kerr; Rosemary Mair; Emma McLeod; Georgia Plimmer; Izzy Sharp (wk)	Chamari Athapaththu (c); Nilakshi de Silva; Kavisha Dilhari; Imesha Dulani; Vishmi Gunaratne; Achini Kulasuriya; Sugandika Kumari; Malki Madara; Manudi Nanayakkara; Sachini Nisansala; Kaushini Nuthyangana (wk); Udeshika Prabodhani; Inoshi Priyadharshani; Harshitha Samarawickrama; Anushka Sanjeewani (wk); Rashmika Sewwandi; Chethana Vimukthi

On 28 February, Bella James was ruled out of the ODI series due to a quadricep strain on her right leg, with Lauren Down named as her replacement. On 3 March, Hayley Jensen was ruled out of the ODI series due to a hip flexor injury, with Fran Jonas named as her replacement. On 6 March, Lauren Down was ruled out of the series with a back injury and was replaced by Izzy Sharp. Also, Emma Black was added into the squad for the third ODI as a cover for Hannah Rowe. On 11 March, Izzy Gaze (hip flexor), Bella James (hip flexor) and Hayley Jensen (quadricep) were ruled out of the T20I series, and were replaced by Bree Illing, Polly Inglis and Flora Devonshire.

== Tour matches ==
27 February 2025
11:00
Scorecard

Sri Lanka; 244 (49.4 overs)	v	New Zealand XI; 284/6 (48.5 overs)
Vishmi Gunaratne 61 (81); Jess Watkin 3/31 (10 overs)		Brooke Halliday 76 (92); Manudi Nanayakkara 1/17 (2 overs)

New Zealand XI won by 6 wickets
Bert Sutcliffe Oval, Lincoln
Umpires: Greg Pennell (NZ) and Craig Pryor (NZ)

- Toss uncontested.

28 February 2025
11:00
Scorecard

Sri Lanka; 201/8 (40 overs)	v	New Zealand XI; 197/9 (40 overs)
Manudi Nanayakkara 58 (59); Jess Watkin 3/26 (8 overs)		Jess Watkin 36 (20); Sachini Nisansala 4/43 (8 overs)

Sri Lanka won by 4 runs
Bert Sutcliffe Oval, Lincoln
Umpires: Greg Pennell (NZ) and Craig Pryor (NZ)

- Toss uncontested.

== ODI series ==
=== 1st ODI ===
4 March 2025
14:00 (D/N)
Scorecard

Sri Lanka; 147/5 (36.4 overs)	v	New Zealand
Harshitha Samarawickrama 66* (96); Bree Illing 2/42 (10 overs)

No result
McLean Park, Napier
Umpires: Cory Black (NZ) and Eloise Sheridan (Aus)

- New Zealand won the toss and elected to field.
- No further play was possible due to rain.
- Bree Illing, Polly Inglis, Emma McLeod (NZ), Manudi Nanayakkara and Chethana Vimukthi (SL) all made their ODI debuts.

=== 2nd ODI ===
7 March 2025
11:00
Scorecard

New Zealand; 245/7 (50 overs)	v	Sri Lanka; 167 (46.4 overs)
Maddy Green 100 (109); Chamari Athapaththu 2/42 (10 overs)		Harshitha Samarawickrama 59 (77); Hannah Rowe 4/31 (10 overs)

New Zealand won by 78 runs
Saxton Oval, Nelson
Umpires: Greg Pennell (NZ) and Eloise Sheridan (Aus)
Player of the match: Maddy Green (NZ)

- New Zealand won the toss and elected to bat.

=== 3rd ODI ===
9 March 2025
11:00
Scorecard

New Zealand; 280/6 (50 overs)	v	Sri Lanka; 182 (50 overs)
Georgia Plimmer 112 (120); Sugandika Kumari 3/70 (10 overs)		Kavisha Dilhari 45 (54); Jess Kerr 3/22 (10 overs)

New Zealand won by 98 runs
Saxton Oval, Nelson
Umpires: Shaun Haig (NZ) and Eloise Sheridan (Aus)
Player of the match: Georgia Plimmer (NZ)

- New Zealand won the toss and elected to bat.
- Georgia Plimmer (NZ) scored her first century in ODIs.

== T20I series ==
=== 1st T20I ===
14 March 2025
19:15 (N)
Scorecard

New Zealand; 101 (18.5 overs)	v	Sri Lanka; 102/3 (14.1 overs)
Emma McLeod 44 (46); Malki Madara 3/14 (3.5 overs)		Chamari Athapaththu 64* (48); Jess Kerr 2/18 (4 overs)

Sri Lanka won by 7 wickets
Hagley Oval, Christchurch
Umpires: Kannan Jagannathan (NZ) and Eloise Sheridan (Aus)
Player of the match: Malki Madara (SL)

- New Zealand won the toss and elected to bat.
- Bree Illing, Polly Inglis, Emma McLeod, Izzy Sharp (NZ), Malki Madara and Manudi Nanayakkara (SL) all made their T20I debuts.
- This was Sri Lanka's first win against New Zealand in women's T20Is.

=== 2nd T20I ===
16 March 2025
10:15
Scorecard

Sri Lanka; 113/7 (20 overs)	v	New Zealand; 117/3 (18.3 overs)
Manudi Nanayakkara 35 (32); Bree Illing 2/18 (4 overs)		Suzie Bates 47 (46); Achini Kulasuriya 1/11 (2.3 overs)

New Zealand won by 7 wickets
Hagley Oval, Christchurch
Umpires: Kim Cotton (NZ) and Tina Semmens (NZ)
Player of the match: Suzie Bates (NZ)

- New Zealand won the toss and elected to field.
- Flora Devonshire (NZ) made her T20I debut.

=== 3rd T20I ===
18 March 2025
10:15
Scorecard

New Zealand; 101/3 (14.1 overs)	v	Sri Lanka
Georgia Plimmer 46* (37); Chamari Athapaththu 1/19 (3 overs)

No result
University of Otago Oval, Dunedin
Umpires: Greg Pennell (NZ) and Eloise Sheridan (Aus)

- Sri Lanka won the toss and elected to field.
- No further play was possible due to rain.
- Rashmika Sewwandi (SL) made her T20I debut.
- Chamari Athapaththu became the first Sri Lanka women cricketer to play her 100th T20I match as a captain.
