= 2023–24 Super Smash (women's cricket) =

Cricket tournament

2023–24 Women's Super Smash
- Dates: 19 December 2023 – 28 January 2024
- Administrator: New Zealand Cricket
- Cricket format: Twenty20
- Tournament format(s): Round robin and knockout finals
- Champions: Wellington Blaze (8th title)
- Runners-up: Central Hinds
- Participants: 6
- Matches: 32
- Most runs: Amelia Kerr (437)
- Most wickets: Amelia Kerr (20)
- Official website: Super Smash

The 2023–24 Dream11 Super Smash was the seventeenth season of the women's Super Smash Twenty20 cricket competition played in New Zealand. It took place between 19 December 2023 and 28 January 2024, with 6 provincial teams taking part. Canterbury Magicians were the defending champions.

The tournament ran alongside the 2023–24 Hallyburton Johnstone Shield.

Wellington Blaze won the tournament after defeating Central Hinds in the final, winning their 8th title.

== Competition format ==
Teams played in a double round-robin in a group of six, therefore playing 10 matches overall. Matches were played using a Twenty20 format. The top team in the group advanced straight to the final, whilst the second and third placed teams played off in an elimination final.

The group worked on a points system with positions being based on the total points. Points were awarded as follows:

Win: 4 points
Tie: 2 points
Loss: 0 points.
Abandoned/No Result: 2 points.

== Points table ==
Pos	Team	Pld	W	L	T	NR	Pts	NRR
1	Wellington Blaze (C)	10	7	1	1	1	32	0.973
2	Northern Brave	10	5	4	1	0	22	0.231
3	Central Hinds	10	4	3	1	2	22	−0.136
4	Otago Sparks	10	5	5	0	0	20	−0.218
5	Canterbury Magicians	10	2	6	1	1	12	−0.060
6	Auckland Hearts	10	2	6	0	2	12	−0.872

Source: Dream11 Super Smash
(C) Champions

Advanced to Grand Final
Advanced to Elimination Final

== Fixtures ==
=== Round-robin ===
19 December 2023 (D/N)
Scorecard

Canterbury Magicians; 127/8 (20 overs)	v	Auckland Hearts; 116/7 (20 overs)
Kate Anderson 25 (26); Skye Bowden 4/18 (4 overs)		Saachi Shahri 24 (28); Gabby Sullivan 3/22 (4 overs)

Canterbury Magicians won by 11 runs
Eden Park Outer Oval, Auckland
Umpires: Wayne Knights and Damian Morrow
Player of the match: Frances Mackay (Canterbury Magicians)

- Auckland Hearts won the toss and elected to field.
- Points: Canterbury Magicians 4, Auckland Hearts 0

21 December 2023
Scorecard

Wellington Blaze; 140/8 (20 overs)	v	Otago Sparks; 117 (19.2 overs)
Georgia Plimmer 41* (37); Poppy-Jay Watkins 4/28 (4 overs)		Suzie Bates 25 (22); Leigh Kasperek 3/25 (4 overs)

Wellington Blaze won by 23 runs
Basin Reserve, Wellington
Umpires: Cory Black and Tyron Davies
Player of the match: Georgia Plimmer (Wellington Blaze)

- Otago Sparks won the toss and elected to field.
- Points: Wellington Blaze 4, Otago Sparks 0

22 December 2023
Scorecard

Northern Brave; 119/6 (20 overs)	v	Central Hinds; 120/4 (19.3 overs)
Eimear Richardson 28 (23); Rosemary Mair 3/18 (4 overs)		Hannah Rowe 35* (34); Jess Watkin 2/17 (4 overs)

Central Hinds won by 6 wickets
Seddon Park, Hamilton
Umpires: Kim Cotton and Wayne Knights
Player of the match: Rosemary Mair (Central Hinds)

- Northern Brave won the toss and elected to bat.
- Points: Central Hinds 4, Northern Brave 0

24 December 2023
Scorecard

Wellington Blaze	v	Auckland Hearts

Match Abandoned
Basin Reserve, Wellington
Umpires: John Dempsey and Tyron Davies

- No toss.
- No play possible due to rain.
- Points: Wellington Blaze 2, Auckland Hearts 2

26 December 2023
Scorecard

Canterbury Magicians; 109/6 (20 overs)	v	Otago Sparks; 110/7 (20 overs)
Izzy Sharp 32 (36); Poppy-Jay Watkins 2/8 (2 overs)		Bella James 26 (23); Lea Tahuhu 1/16 (4 overs)

Otago Sparks won by 3 wickets
Hagley Oval, Christchurch
Umpires: Cory Black and Kannan Jagannathan
Player of the match: Poppy-Jay Watkins (Otago Sparks)

- Otago Sparks won the toss and elected to field.
- Points: Otago Sparks 4, Canterbury Magicians 0

27 December 2023
Scorecard

Central Hinds; 141/7 (20 overs)	v	Northern Brave; 135/7 (20 overs)
Thamsyn Newton 33 (37); Marama Downes 2/10 (4 overs)		Marina Lamplough 38 (32); Ashtuti Kumar 2/19 (4 overs)

Central Hinds won by 6 runs
Fitzherbert Park, Palmerston North
Umpires: Tim Parlane and Vinit Mahna
Player of the match: Georgia Atkinson (Central Hinds)

- Central Hinds won the toss and elected to bat.
- Points: Central Hinds 4, Northern Brave 0

28 December 2023
Scorecard

Wellington Blaze; 159/3 (20 overs)	v	Otago Sparks; 139/7 (20 overs)
Amelia Kerr 88 (57); Suzie Bates 1/12 (1 over)		Suzie Bates 70 (55); Xara Jetly 3/28 (4 overs)

Wellington Blaze won by 20 runs
Molyneux Park, Alexandra
Umpires: John Dempsey and Kannan Jagannathan
Player of the match: Amelia Kerr (Wellington Blaze)

- Wellington Blaze won the toss and elected to bat.
- Points: Wellington Blaze 4, Otago Sparks 0

29 December 2023
Scorecard

Central Hinds	v	Auckland Hearts

Match Abandoned
Pukekura Park, New Plymouth
Umpires: Derek Walker and Greg Pennell

- No toss.
- No play possible due to rain.
- Points: Central Hinds 2, Auckland Hearts 2

30 December 2023
Scorecard

Central Hinds; 79/3 (12 overs)	v	Canterbury Magicians; 54/4 (8 overs)
Hollie Armitage 26 (27); Fatima Sana 2/11 (2 overs)		Fatima Sana 34* (25); Ashtuti Kumar 2/13 (2 overs)

Central Hinds won by 6 runs (DLS)
Pukekura Park, New Plymouth
Umpires: Cory Black and Greg Pennell
Player of the match: Hannah Rowe (Central Hinds)

- Canterbury Magicians won the toss and elected to field.
- Central Hinds innings reduced to 12 overs due to rain.
- Canterbury Magicians were set a revised target of 61 runs from 8 overs due to rain.
- Points: Central Hinds 4, Canterbury Magicians 0

1 January 2024
Scorecard

Otago Sparks; 151/4 (20 overs)	v	Auckland Hearts; 104 (17.4 overs)
Suzie Bates 84* (62); Anna Browning 1/20 (3 overs)		Saachi Shahri 37 (33); Molly Loe 4/12 (4 overs)

Otago Sparks won by 47 runs
Molyneux Park, Alexandra
Umpires: Derek Walker and Pete Pasco
Player of the match: Molly Loe (Otago Sparks)

- Otago Sparks won the toss and elected to bat.
- Points: Otago Sparks 4, Auckland Hearts 0

2 January 2024
Scorecard

Wellington Blaze; 110 (19.4 overs)	v	Northern Brave; 111/5 (19.4 overs)
Jess Kerr 23 (15); Chamari Athapaththu 4/19 (4 overs)		Caitlin Gurrey 33 (38); Amelia Kerr 2/21 (4 overs)

Northern Brave won by 5 wickets
Bay Oval, Mount Maunganui
Umpires: Christelle High and John Dempsey
Player of the match: Chamari Athapaththu (Northern Brave)

- Wellington Blaze won the toss and elected to bat.
- Points: Northern Brave 4, Wellington Blaze 0

3 January 2024
Scorecard

Canterbury Magicians; 145/7 (20 overs)	v	Otago Sparks; 69 (14.4 overs)
Frances Mackay 51 (46); Suzie Bates 1/19 (3 overs)		Suzie Bates 33 (35); Lea Tahuhu 3/10 (3 overs)

Canterbury Magicians won by 76 runs
Molyneux Park, Alexandra
Umpires: Pete Pasco and Shaun Haig
Player of the match: Lea Tahuhu (Canterbury Magicians)

- Canterbury Magicians won the toss and elected to bat.
- Points: Canterbury Magicians 4, Otago Sparks 0

4 January 2024
Scorecard

Auckland Hearts; 93/7 (20 overs)	v	Wellington Blaze; 97/5 (18.2 overs)
Maddy Green 36 (46); Leigh Kasperek 2/27 (4 overs)		Jess McFadyen 39 (41); Skye Bowden 2/21 (3 overs)

Wellington Blaze won by 5 wickets
Eden Park Outer Oval, Auckland
Umpires: Vinit Mahna and Wayne Knights
Player of the match: Georgia Plimmer (Wellington Blaze)

- Auckland Hearts won the toss and elected to bat.
- Points: Wellington Blaze 4, Auckland Hearts 0

5 January 2024
Scorecard

Canterbury Magicians	v	Central Hinds

Match Abandoned
Hagley Oval, Christchurch
Umpires: Billy Bowden and Kim Cotton

- No toss.
- No play possible due to rain.
- Points: Canterbury Magicians 2, Central Hinds 2

6 January 2024
Scorecard

Northern Brave; 93/6 (15 overs)	v	Otago Sparks; 95/1 (12.4 overs)
Caitlin Gurrey 30 (29); Eden Carson 1/11 (2 overs)		Suzie Bates 41* (40); Jesse Prasad 1/10 (2 overs)

Otago won by 9 wickets (DLS)
Seddon Park, Hamilton
Umpires: Chris Brown and Tina Semmens
Player of the match: Suzie Bates (Otago Sparks)

- Northern Brave won the toss and elected to bat.
- Match reduced to 15 overs per side due to rain.
- Otago Sparks were set a revised target of 95 runs from 15 overs due to rain.
- Points: Otago Sparks 4, Northern Brave 0

7 January 2024
Scorecard

Canterbury Magicians; 152/7 (20 overs)	v	Auckland Hearts; 153/6 (20 overs)
Izzy Sharp 45 (28); Skye Bowden 3/36 (4 overs)		Maddy Green 71 (53); Lea Tahuhu 2/15 (4 overs)

Auckland Hearts won by 4 wickets
Hagley Oval, Christchurch
Umpires: Kannan Jagannathan and Shaun Haig
Player of the match: Maddy Green (Auckland Hearts)

- Canterbury Magicians won the toss and elected to bat.
- Points: Auckland Hearts 4, Canterbury Magicians 0

8 January 2024
Scorecard

Central Hinds; 131/4 (20 overs)	v	Wellington Blaze; 132/2 (19 overs)
Hannah Rowe 43 (39); Amelia Kerr 1/16 (4 overs)		Amelia Kerr 60* (50); Hannah Rowe 1/20 (3 overs)

Wellington Blaze won by 8 wickets
McLean Park, Napier
Umpires: Tim Parlane and Wayne Knights
Player of the match: Amelia Kerr (Wellington Blaze)

- Central Hinds won the toss and elected to bat.
- Points: Wellington Blaze 4, Central Hinds 0

9 January 2024
Scorecard

Northern Brave; 136/9 (20 overs)	v	Canterbury Magicians; 136/6 (20 overs)
Chamari Athapaththu 35 (29); Sarah Asmussen 3/27 (4 overs)		Frances Mackay 51 (41); Jess Watkin 1/22 (4 overs)

Match Tied
Hagley Oval, Christchurch
Umpires: Chris Brown and Shaun Haig
Player of the match: Chamari Athapaththu (Northern Brave)

- Northern Brave won the toss and elected to bat.
- Points: Canterbury Magicians 2, Northern Brave 2

10 January 2024
Scorecard

Central Hinds; 115/7 (20 overs)	v	Otago Sparks; 116/2 (17 overs)
Hollie Armitage 47 (40); Eden Carson 3/15 (4 overs)		Suzie Bates 52* (49); Claudia Green 1/19 (4 overs)

Otago Sparks won by 8 wickets
McLean Park, Napier
Umpires: Cory Black and Derek Walker
Player of the match: Suzie Bates (Otago Sparks)

- Otago Sparks won the toss and elected to field.
- Points: Otago Sparks 4, Central Hinds 0

11 January 2024
Scorecard

Wellington Blaze; 154/6 (20 overs)	v	Canterbury Magicians; 107/9 (20 overs)
Amelia Kerr 77* (55); Madeline Penna 3/4 (2 overs)		Madeline Penna 25 (25); Amelia Kerr 5/10 (4 overs)

Wellington Blaze won by 47 runs
Hagley Oval, Christchurch
Umpires: John Dempsey and Tim Parlane
Player of the match: Amelia Kerr (Wellington Blaze)

- Wellington Blaze won the toss and elected to bat.
- Points: Wellington Blaze 4, Canterbury Magicians 0

12 January 2024
Scorecard

Northern Brave; 133/7 (20 overs)	v	Auckland Hearts; 114/7 (20 overs)
Chamari Athapaththu 58 (38); Fran Jonas 2/22 (3 overs)		Maddy Green 32 (35); Marama Downes 2/24 (4 overs)

Northern Brave won by 19 runs
Bay Oval, Mount Maunganui
Umpires: Billy Bowden and Greg Pennell
Player of the match: Chamari Athapaththu (Northern Brave)

- Auckland Hearts won the toss and elected to field.
- Points: Northern Brave 4, Auckland Hearts 0

13 January 2024
Scorecard

Wellington Blaze; 109/7 (20 overs)	v	Central Hinds; 109 (19 overs)
Georgia Plimmer 41 (37); Rosemary Mair 2/19 (4 overs)		Hollie Armitage 33 (28); Amelia Kerr 5/13 (4 overs)

Match Tied
Basin Reserve, Wellington
Umpires: Glen Walklin and Tina Semmens
Player of the match: Amelia Kerr (Wellington Blaze)

- Wellington Blaze won the toss and elected to bat.
- Points: Wellington Blaze 2, Central Hinds 2

14 January 2024
Scorecard

Auckland Hearts; 146/6 (20 overs)	v	Otago Sparks; 137/8 (20 overs)
Maddy Green 77* (56); Hayley Jensen 1/16 (3 overs)		Caitlin Blakely 50* (40); Fran Jonas 3/23 (4 overs)

Auckland Hearts won by 9 runs
Eden Park, Auckland
Umpires: Billy Bowden and Tim Parlane
Player of the match: Maddy Green (Auckland Hearts)

- Otago Sparks won the toss and elected to field.
- Points: Auckland Hearts 4, Otago Sparks 0

15 January 2024
Scorecard

Northern Brave; 118/8 (17 overs)	v	Wellington Blaze; 124/2 (15 overs)
Chamari Athapaththu 45 (20); Leigh Kasperek 3/16 (4 overs)		Amelia Kerr 73* (49); Shriya Naidu 1/13 (2 overs)

Wellington Blaze won by 8 wickets
Basin Reserve, Wellington
Umpires: Cory Black and Tyron Davies
Player of the match: Amelia Kerr (Wellington Blaze)

- Northern Brave won the toss and elected to field.
- Match reduced to 17 overs per side due to rain.
- Points: Wellington Blaze 4, Northern Brave 0

16 January 2024
Scorecard

Central Hinds; 146/5 (20 overs)	v	Auckland Hearts; 128/8 (20 overs)
Georgia Atkinson 42 (36); Molly Penfold 2/26 (4 overs)		Saachi Shahri 33 (26); Priyanaz Chatterji 2/13 (3 overs)

Central Hinds won by 18 runs
Eden Park, Auckland
Umpires: Tim Parlane and Damian Morrow
Player of the match: Priyanaz Chatterji (Central Hinds)

- Central Hinds won the toss and elected to bat.
- Points: Central Hinds 4, Auckland Hearts 0

18 January 2024
Scorecard

Northern Brave; 123/5 (20 overs)	v	Canterbury Magicians; 53/5 (7 overs)
Caitlin Gurrey 53* (47); Lea Tahuhu 2/16 (4 overs)		Frances Mackay 19 (13); Marama Downes 2/14 (2 overs)

Northern Brave won by 1 run (DLS)
Seddon Park, Hamilton
Umpires: John Dempsey and Vinit Mahna

- Northern Brave won the toss and elected to bat.
- Canterbury Magicians were set a revised target of 55 runs from 7 overs due to rain.
- Points: Northern Brave 4, Canterbury Magicians 0

19 January 2024
Scorecard

Central Hinds; 107/7 (20 overs)	v	Otago Sparks; 111/4 (16.3 overs)
Rosemary Mair 32 (35); Emma Black 4/17 (4 overs)		Suzie Bates 44 (29); Priyanaz Chatterji 2/16 (3 overs)

Otago Sparks won by 6 wickets
University of Otago Oval, Dunedin
Umpires: Pete Pasco and Tim Parlane
Player of the match: Emma Black (Otago Sparks)

- Otago Sparks won the toss and elected to field.
- Points: Otago Sparks 4, Central Hinds 0

20 January 2024
Scorecard

Northern Brave; 145/9 (20 overs)	v	Auckland Hearts; 106 (19.2 overs)
Nensi Patel 31 (32); Josie Penfold 3/31 (4 overs)		Prue Catton 53 (44); Marama Downes 5/12 (3.2 overs)

Northern Brave won by 39 runs
Eden Park, Auckland
Umpires: Billy Bowden and Tina Semmens
Player of the match: Marama Downes (Northern Brave)

- Northern Brave won the toss and elected to bat.
- Points: Northern Brave 4, Auckland Hearts 0

22 January 2024
Scorecard

Canterbury Magicians; 97 (20 overs)	v	Wellington Blaze; 98/2 (13.5 overs)
Frances Mackay 31 (41); Leigh Kasperek 3/20 (4 overs)		Amelia Kerr 48* (35); Lea Tahuhu 1/17 (4 overs)

Wellington Blaze won by 8 wickets
Basin Reserve, Wellington
Umpires: Allen Stanley and Pete Pasco
Player of the match: Amelia Kerr (Wellington Blaze)

- Canterbury Magicians won the toss and elected to bat.
- Points: Wellington Blaze 4, Canterbury Magicians 0

23 January 2024
Scorecard

Northern Brave; 94/1 (12 overs)	v	Otago Sparks; 64/6 (9 overs)
Chamari Athapaththu 46 (37); Linsey Smith 1/20 (2 overs)		Caitlin Blakely 20 (13); Jess Watkin 2/5 (2 overs)

Northern Brave won by 22 runs (DLS)
University of Otago Oval, Dunedin
Umpires: Derek Walker and Tim Parlane
Player of the match: Chamari Athapaththu (Northern Brave)

- Otago Sparks won the toss and elected to field.
- Northern Brave innings reduced to 12 overs due to rain.
- Otago Sparks were set a revised target of 87 runs from 9 overs due to rain.
- Points: Northern Brave 4, Otago Sparks 0

== Finals ==
=== Bracket ===
Elimination Final			Grand Final
			1	Wellington Blaze	89 (17 overs)
2	Central Hinds	151/5 (20 overs)	EFW	Central Hinds	88/5 (17 overs)
3	Northern Brave	106 (16.5 overs)

=== Elimination Final ===
Elimination Final
26 January 2024
Scorecard

Central Hinds; 151/5 (20 overs)	v	Northern Brave; 106 (16.5 overs)
Hollie Armitage 78 (50); Marina Lamplough 2/22 (3 overs)		Caitlin Gurrey 52 (43); Claudia Green 4/24 (4 overs)

Central Hinds won by 45 runs
Seddon Park, Hamilton
Umpires: Chris Brown and Pete Pasco
Player of the match: Hollie Armitage (Central Hinds)

- Central Hinds won the toss and elected to bat.

=== Grand Final ===
Grand Final
28 January 2024
Scorecard

Wellington Blaze; 89 (17 overs)	v	Central Hinds; 88/5 (17 overs)
Amelia Kerr 35 (35); Rosemary Mair 4/5 (4 overs)		Thamsyn Newton 27* (42); Sophie Devine 1/18 (3 overs)

Wellington Blaze won by 1 run (DLS)
Eden Park, Auckland
Umpires: Kim Cotton and Kannan Jagannathan
Player of the match: Amelia Kerr (Wellington Blaze)

- Wellington Blaze won the toss and elected to bat.
- Match reduced to 17 overs per side due to rain.
- Central Hinds were set a revised target of 90 runs from 17 overs due to rain.

== Statistics ==
=== Most runs ===
Player	Team	Matches	Innings	Runs	Average	HS	100s	50s
Amelia Kerr	Wellington Blaze	10	10	437	72.83	88	0	4
Suzie Bates	Otago Sparks	10	10	398	56.85	84*	0	3
Hollie Armitage	Central Hinds	10	10	318	31.80	78	0	1
Maddy Green	Auckland Hearts	7	7	283	47.16	77*	0	2
Caitlin Gurrey	Northern Brave	11	11	230	25.55	53*	0	2

Source: ESPN Cricinfo

=== Most wickets ===
Player	Team	Overs	Wickets	Average	BBI	5w
Amelia Kerr	Wellington Blaze	40.0	20	8.95	5/10	2
Leigh Kasperek	Wellington Blaze	39.0	17	12.35	3/16	0
Marama Downes	Northern Brave	36.2	16	12.68	5/12	1
Rosemary Mair	Central Hinds	36.5	14	15.42	4/5	0
Emma Black	Otago Sparks	36.0	13	16.61	4/17	0

Source: ESPN Cricinfo
