= 2024 Women's T20 World Cup final =

Final match of the 2024 WT20WC

2024 ICC Women's T20 World Cup final
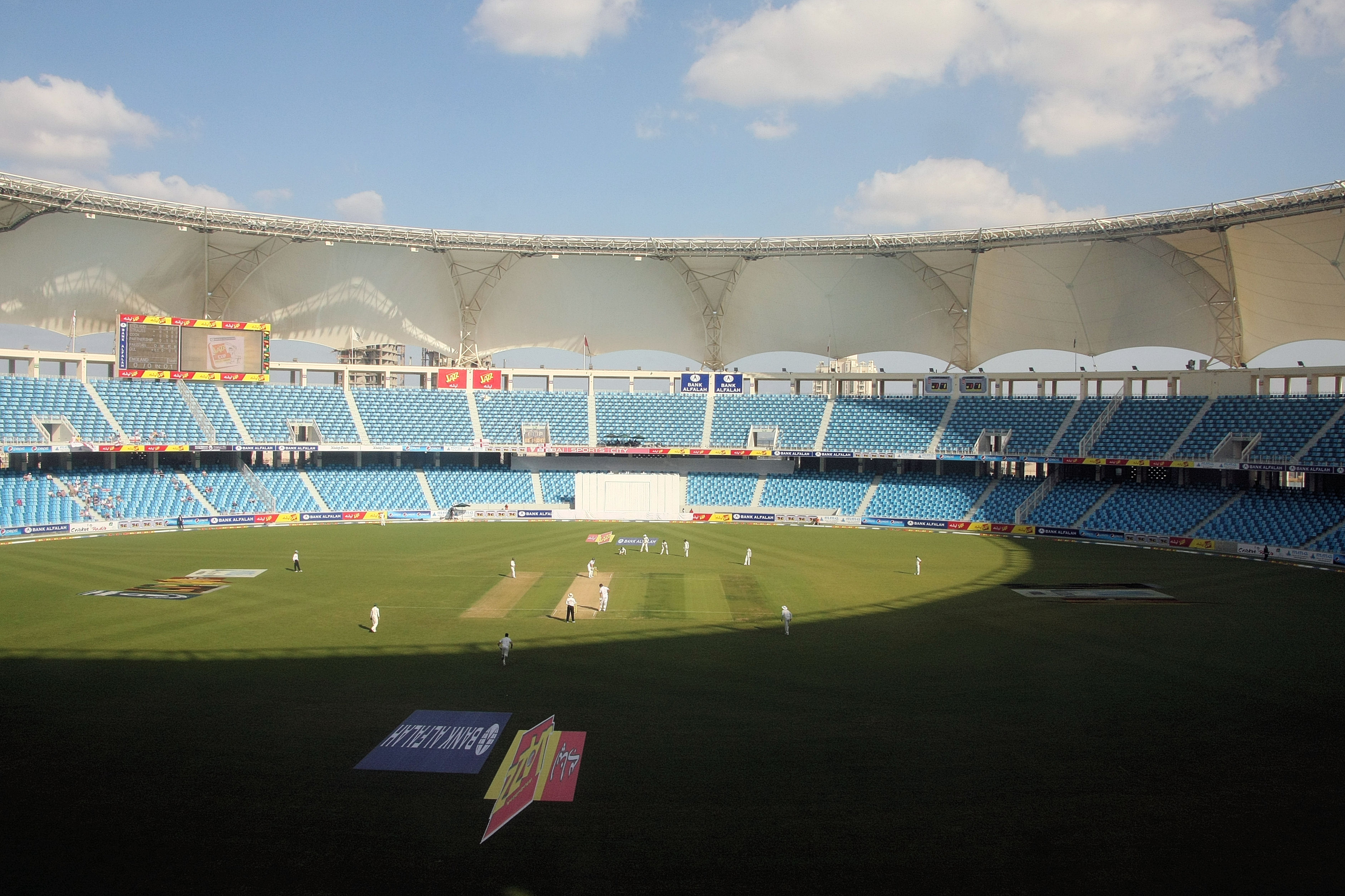
- The Dubai International Cricket Stadium (pictured in 2019), hosted its first Women's T20 World Cup final.
- Event: 2024 ICC Women's T20 World Cup
| New Zealand | South Africa |
| 158/5 | 126/9 |
| 20 overs | 20 overs |
- New Zealand won by 32 runs
- Date: 20 October 2024
- Venue: Dubai International Cricket Stadium, Dubai
- Player of the match: Amelia Kerr (NZ)
- Umpires: Nimali Perera (SL); Claire Polosak (Aus)
- Attendance: 21,457

The 2024 ICC Women's T20 World Cup final was a Women's Twenty20 International cricket match that was played at the Dubai International Cricket Stadium in Dubai, United Arab Emirates on 20 October 2024 to determine the winner of the 2024 ICC Women's T20 World Cup. It was played between New Zealand and South Africa.

New Zealand defeated South Africa by 32 runs to win their maiden T20 World Cup title. Amelia Kerr was named as the Player of the Match for her all round performance of 43 (38) and 3/24 as well as the Player of the Tournament for taking 15 wickets and scoring 135 runs.

== Background ==
In August 2024, after relocating the ICC Women's T20 World Cup from Bangladesh to the United Arab Emirates, the ICC announced that Dubai International Cricket Stadium, Dubai will be hosting the final on 20 October.

South Africa qualified for their second consecutive final losing the 2023 to Australia. New Zealand on the other hand reached their third final, having lost on both previous occasions, to England in 2009 and to Australia in 2010. Previously, the teams have played each other five times in ICC Women's T20 World Cup with South Africa winning twice (2014, 2023) and New Zealand winning thrice (2009, 2012, 2016). This will also be the first time that either of the teams has won the ICC Men's or Women's T20 World Cup trophy.

== Road to the final ==
=== Overview ===
- Source: ESPNcricinfo

| South Africa | | | | VS | New Zealand |
|---|---|---|---|---|---|---|---|---|
| Opponent | Date | Result | Points | Match | Opponent | Date | Result | Points |
| Group B | | | | Group stage | Group A |
| West Indies | 4 October 2024 | Won | 2 | 1 | India | 4 October 2024 | Won | 2 |
| England | 7 October 2024 | Lost | 2 | 2 | Australia | 8 October 2024 | Lost | 2 |
| Scotland | 9 October 2024 | Won | 4 | 3 | Sri Lanka | 12 October 2024 | Won | 4 |
| Bangladesh | 12 October 2024 | Won | 6 | 4 | Pakistan | 14 October 2024 | Won | 6 |
| Semi-final 1 | | | | Knockout stage | Semi-final 2 |
| Australia | 17 October 2024 | Won | | SF | West Indies | 18 October 2024 | Won |
2024 ICC Women's T20 World Cup final

=== South Africa ===
South Africa began their T20 World Cup campaign with a victory over West Indies by 10 wickets. They lost their match to England on 7 October by 7 wickets. On 9 October, they defeated Scotland by a huge margin of 80 runs. In their final group match, they defeated Bangladesh by 7 wickets, and qualified to the semi-finals as runners-up in Group B.

South Africa then defeated Australia by 8 wickets in the semi-final at the Dubai International Cricket Stadium in Dubai to earn their place at a second consecutive T20 World Cup final.

=== New Zealand ===
New Zealand began their T20 World Cup campaign with a victory over India by 58 runs. They lost their second match to Australia on 8 October by 60 runs. On 9 October, they defeated Sri Lanka by 8 wickets. In their final group match, they defeated Pakistan by 54 runs, and qualified to the semi-finals as runners-up in Group A.

New Zealand then defeated West Indies by 8 runs in the semi-final at the Sharjah Cricket Stadium in Sharjah to earn their place at the final.

== Match ==
=== Match officials ===
On 19 October 2024, the International Cricket Council (ICC) named Sri Lanka's Nimali Perera and Australia's Claire Polosak as the on-field umpires, along with England's Anna Harris as the TV umpire, West Indies' Jacqueline Williams as the reserve umpire, and India's GS Lakshmi as match referee.

- On-field umpires: Nimali Perera (SL) and Claire Polosak (Aus)
- TV umpire: Anna Harris (Eng)
- Reserve umpire: Jacqueline Williams (WI)
- Match referee: GS Lakshmi (Ind)

=== Team and toss ===
Both teams remained unchanged from their semi-final matches. South Africa's captain Laura Wolvaardt won the toss and elected to field first.

=== New Zealand innings ===
Suzie Bates started the innings with taking a single on the very first ball. Then, Georgia Plimmer hit two fours in the first over before getting dismissed in the next over by Ayabonga Khaka. Then Bates and Amelia Kerr steadied the scoring with a 37 run partnership before Nonkululeko Mlaba bowled out Bates. Then Nadine de Klerk in her first over, got the wicket of New Zealand's captain Sophie Devine for just 6. Then Kerr was joined by Brooke Halliday, and they had a 57 run partnership. Halliday was dismissed by Chloe Tryon for 38, and Kerr was later dismissed for 43 by Mlaba. Maddy Green hit a six in the last over, and the New Zealand innings ended at 158/5 after 20 overs.

=== South Africa innings ===
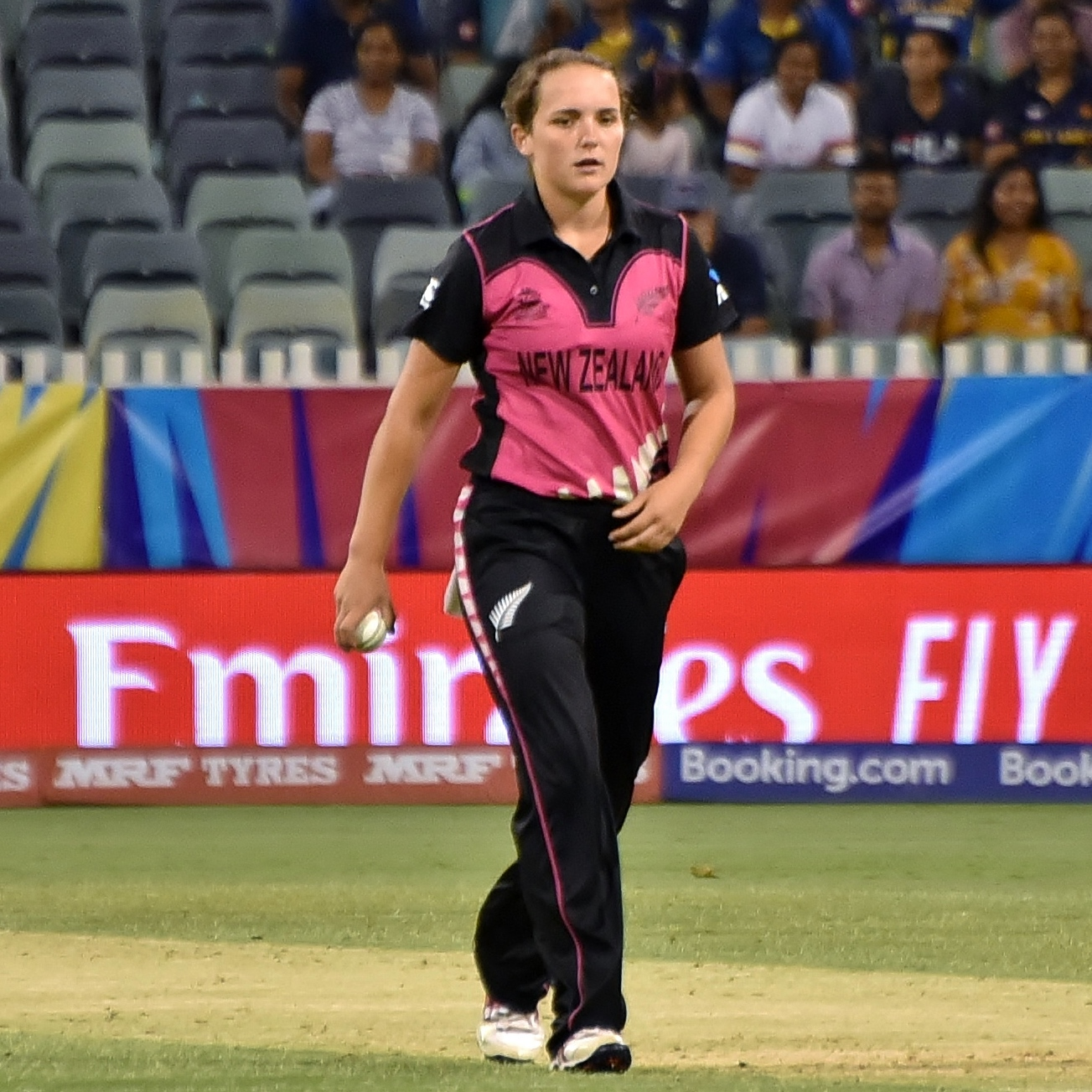
Amelia Kerr was awarded with the player of the match award in the final for her all round performance of 43 (38) and 3/24

Laura Wolvaardt and Tazmin Brits provided South Africa with a solid start, powering South Africa to 47/0 in the powerplay. Then, Brits was dismissed in the 7th over by Fran Jonas for 17. In the 10th over, Kerr struck twice, first dismissing Wolvaardt for 33 in the first ball, and followed by Anneke Bosch for 9 in the last ball. Marizanne Kapp was the next to be dismissed by Eden Carson for 8 and in the very next ball Rosemary Mair dismissed Nadine de Klerk for 6 reducing South Africa to 77/5. Then, South Africa lost wickets at regular intervals, with Suné Luus dismissed for 8, Annerie Dercksen for 10, and Tryon for 14 ending their innings at 126/9 from 20 overs and losing the match by 32 runs.

=== Match details ===
20 October 2024
18:00 (N)
Scorecard

| New Zealand; 158/5 (20 overs) | v | South Africa; 126/9 (20 overs) |
| Amelia Kerr 43 (38); Nonkululeko Mlaba 2/31 (4 overs) | | Laura Wolvaardt 33 (27); Amelia Kerr 3/24 (4 overs) |

New Zealand won by 32 runs
Dubai International Cricket Stadium, Dubai
Umpires: Nimali Perera (SL) and Claire Polosak (Aus)
Player of the match: Amelia Kerr (NZ)

- South Africa won the toss and elected to field.
- This was New Zealand first ICC Women's T20 title.

=== Match scorecard ===
- Source: ESPNcricinfo

==== 1st innings ====
New Zealand batting
| Player | Status | Runs | Balls | 4s | 6s | Strike rate |
|---|---|---|---|---|---|---|
| Suzie Bates | b Mlaba | 32 | 31 | 3 | 0 | 103.22 |
| Georgia Plimmer | c Luus b Khaka | 9 | 7 | 2 | 0 | 128.57 |
| Amelia Kerr | c Brits b Mlaba | 43 | 38 | 4 | 0 | 113.15 |
| Sophie Devine (c) | lbw b de Klerk | 6 | 10 | 0 | 0 | 60.00 |
| Brooke Halliday | c Bosch b Tyron | 38 | 28 | 3 | 0 | 135.71 |
| Maddy Green | not out | 12 | 6 | 0 | 1 | 200.00 |
| Izzy Gaze (wk) | not out | 3 | 3 | 0 | 0 | 100.00 |
| Rosemary Mair | did not bat | | | | | |
| Lea Tahuhu | did not bat | | | | | |
| Eden Carson | did not bat | | | | | |
| Fran Jonas | did not bat | | | | | |
| Extras | (lb 2, nb 3, w 10) | 15 | | | | |
| Total | (5 wickets; 20 overs) | 158 | | 12 | 1 | RR: 7.90 |

Fall of wickets: 1/16 (Plimmer, 1.5 ov), 2/53 (Bates, 7.4 ov), 3/70 (Devine, 10.2 ov), 4/127 (Halliday, 17.2 ov), 5/141 (Kerr, 18.5 ov)

South Africa bowling
| Bowler | Overs | Maidens | Runs | Wickets | Econ | Wides | NBs |
|---|---|---|---|---|---|---|---|
| Marizanne Kapp | 4 | 0 | 25 | 0 | 6.25 | 1 | 2 |
| Ayabonga Khaka | 4 | 0 | 44 | 1 | 11.00 | 1 | 0 |
| Chloe Tyron | 4 | 0 | 22 | 1 | 5.50 | 1 | 0 |
| Nonkululeko Mlaba | 4 | 0 | 31 | 2 | 7.75 | 3 | 0 |
| Nadine de Klerk | 2 | 0 | 17 | 1 | 8.50 | 0 | 1 |
| Suné Luus | 2 | 0 | 17 | 0 | 8.50 | 0 | 0 |

==== 2nd innings ====
South Africa batting
| Player | Status | Runs | Balls | 4s | 6s | Strike rate |
|---|---|---|---|---|---|---|
| Laura Wolvaardt (c) | c Bates b Kerr | 33 | 27 | 5 | 0 | 122.22 |
| Tazmin Brits | c Green b Jonas | 17 | 18 | 1 | 0 | 94.44 |
| Anneke Bosch | c †Gaze b Kerr | 9 | 13 | 1 | 0 | 69.23 |
| Marizanne Kapp | c Plimmer b Carson | 8 | 8 | 1 | 0 | 100.00 |
| Nadine de Klerk | c Kerr b Mair | 6 | 7 | 0 | 0 | 85.71 |
| Chloe Tryon | c Green b Mair | 14 | 16 | 1 | 0 | 87.50 |
| Suné Luus | c Bates b Halliday | 8 | 9 | 0 | 0 | 88.88 |
| Annerie Dercksen | c Bates b Kerr | 10 | 9 | 0 | 0 | 111.11 |
| Sinalo Jafta (wk) | b Mair | 6 | 4 | 1 | 0 | 150.00 |
| Nonkululeko Mlaba | not out | 4 | 5 | 0 | 0 | 80.00 |
| Ayabonga Khaka | not out | 4 | 4 | 0 | 0 | 100.00 |
| Extras | (b 2, w 5) | 7 | | | | |
| Total | (9 wickets; 20 overs) | 126 | | 10 | 0 | RR: 6.30 |

Fall of wickets: 1/51 (Brits, 6.5 ov), 2/59 (Wolvaardt, 9.1 ov), 3/64 (Bosch, 10 ov), 4/77 (Kapp, 12 ov), 5/77 (de Klerk, 12.1 ov), 6/97 (Luus, 15.1 ov), 7/111 (Dercksen, 17.3 ov), 8/117 (18.1 ov), 9/120 (Jafta, 18.5 ov)

New Zealand bowling
| Bowler | Overs | Maidens | Runs | Wickets | Econ | Wides | NBs |
|---|---|---|---|---|---|---|---|
| Rosemary Mair | 4 | 0 | 25 | 3 | 6.25 | 3 | 0 |
| Eden Carson | 4 | 0 | 22 | 1 | 5.50 | 0 | 0 |
| Fran Jonas | 4 | 0 | 28 | 1 | 7.00 | 1 | 0 |
| Lea Tahuhu | 3 | 0 | 21 | 0 | 7.00 | 0 | 0 |
| Amelia Kerr | 4 | 0 | 24 | 3 | 6.00 | 0 | 0 |
| Brooke Halliday | 1 | 0 | 4 | 1 | 4.00 | 1 | 0 |

== Broadcasting ==
The T20 World Cup streamed on ICC.tv for free to 116 territories in Afghanistan, Continental Europe, the Pacific Islands, and South-East Asia.

Broadcasters for the 2024 WT20WC
| Region | Country/Sub-region | Television Broadcaster | Radio |
|---|---|---|---|
| Asia | Bangladesh | Nagorik | |
| Asia | India | Star Sports; Disney+ Hotstar | All India Radio (AIR) |
| Asia | Pakistan | PTV Home; PTV National; PTV Sports; Ten Sports | |
| Asia | Singapore | StarHub | —N/a |
| Asia | Sri Lanka | TV 1 | —N/a |
| Europe | Ireland | Sky Sports | |
| Europe | United Kingdom | Sky Sports | BBC Radio |
| Americas | Canada | Willow | —N/a |
| Americas | United States | Willow | —N/a |
| Americas | Caribbean | ESPN Caribbean | —N/a |
| Oceania | Australia | Amazon Prime | ABC Sport |
| Oceania | New Zealand | Sky Sport NZ | —N/a |
| Oceania | Pacific Islands | Sky Pacific | —N/a |
| Africa | Middle East and North Africa | CricLife Women | Talk 100.3 FM; Big 106.2 |
| Africa | African Union | Super Sport | —N/a |
