= Izzy Sharp =

Izzy Sharp may refer to:

- Izzy Sharp (cyclist) (born 2005), British cyclist
- Izzy Sharp (cricketer) (born 2004), New Zealand cricketer
- Isadore Sharp (born 1931) Canadian hotelier and philanthropist
