= 2024 T20 World Cup final =

2024 T20 World Cup final may refer to:

- 2024 Men's T20 World Cup final
- 2024 Women's T20 World Cup final
