= Robbie Kerr (New Zealand cricketer) =

New Zealand cricketer (born 1966)

Personal information
- Full name: Robert James Kerr
- Born: 6 April 1966 (age 60); Wellington, New Zealand
- Batting: Right-handed
- Role: Batsman, occasional wicket-keeper
- Relatives: Jo Murray (wife); Amelia Kerr (daughter); Jess Kerr (daughter); Bruce Murray (father-in-law)

Domestic team information
- Years: Team
- 1993/94–1997/98: Wellington

Career statistics
Competition	First-class	List A
Matches	7	52
Runs scored	102	955
Batting average	11.33	28.08
100s/50s	0/0	0/4
Top score	29	61
Catches/stumpings	3/1	13/1
- Source: Cricinfo, 30 October 2019

Robert James Kerr (born 4 April 1966) is a former New Zealand cricketer who played first-class and List A cricket for Wellington from 1993 to 1998.

Robbie Kerr was a middle-order batsman and occasional wicket-keeper who was a one-day specialist. He made his highest List A score of 61 when he won the man of the match award in Wellington's victory over Otago in 1993–94.

Kerr was the High Performance Manager for Cricket Wellington until July 2011, when he was appointed Director of Cricket. In 2022 he was elected a vice-president of Cricket Wellington.

His daughters, Amelia and Jess Kerr, play for the New Zealand women's cricket team. His wife Jo, the daughter of the New Zealand Test batsman Bruce Murray, is a former member of the Wellington women's cricket team.
