= Chethana Vimukthi =

Sri Lankan cricketer (born 2002)

Personal information
- Full name: Aluth Gedara Chethana Vimukthi
- Born: 10 January 2002 (age 24); Badulla, Sri Lanka
- Batting: Right-handed
- Bowling: Right-arm medium-fast
- Role: Bowler

International information
- National side: Sri Lanka
- ODI debut (cap 79): 4 March 2025 v New Zealand
- Last ODI: 9 March 2025 v New Zealand
- ODI shirt no.: 5
- T20I debut (cap 62): 29 August 2026 v United Arab Emirates

Domestic team information
- Years: Team
- 2022: Sri Lanka Navy Sports Club
- 2023/24–present: Panadura Sports Club

Career statistics
| Competition | ODI | LA | T20 |
|---|---|---|---|
| Matches | 3 | 21 | 9 |
| Runs scored | 4 | 37 | 22 |
| Batting average | 7.00 | 4.11 | 7.33 |
| 100s/50s | 0/0 | 0/0 | 0/0 |
| Top score | 7* | 15 | 11 |
| Balls bowled | 64 | 568 | 89 |
| Wickets | 0 | 25 | 5 |
| Bowling average | – | 16.28 | 13.20 |
| 5 wickets in innings | – | 2 | 0 |
| 10 wickets in match | – | 0 | 0 |
| Best bowling | – | 6/22 | 2/15 |
| Catches/stumpings | 0/– | 6/– | 1/– |
Medal record
Women's cricket
Representing India
ACC Asia Cup
| Runner-up | 2026 UAE |
- Source: Cricinfo, 11 July 2025

Aluth Gedara Chethana Vimukthi (born 10 January 2002, known as Chethana Vimukthi) is a Sri Lankan cricketer who plays for the Sri Lanka women's cricket team as a right-hand batter and right-arm fast bowler.

== Career ==
In February 2025, Vimukthi earned maiden call-up for national team in ODI and T20I squad for the series against New Zealand. She made her ODI debut in the same series on 4 March 2025.
