= Rashmika Sewwandi =

Sri Lankan cricketer (born 2006)

Personal information
- Full name: Rashmika Sewwandi Hewalanka Geeganage
- Born: 21 October 2006 (age 20)
- Batting: Left-handed
- Bowling: Right-arm medium-fast
- Role: Batting all-rounder

International information
- National side: Sri Lanka
- T20I debut (cap 57): 18 March 2025 v New Zealand
- Last T20I: 30 December 2025 v India
- T20I shirt no.: 12

Domestic team information
- Years: Team
- 2023/24–present: Panadura Sports Club

Career statistics
Competition	List A	Twenty20
Matches	12	10
Runs scored	138	40
Batting average	19.71	8.00
100s/50s	0/0	0/0
Top score	43*	21
Balls bowled	288	36
Wickets	15	2
Bowling average	12.73	19.00
5 wickets in innings	1	0
10 wickets in match	0	0
Best bowling	6/6	1/11
Catches/stumpings	4/–	3/–
Medal record
Women's cricket
Representing Sri Lanka
Asian Games
Silver medal – second place	2026 Aichi–Nagoya	Team
- Source: Cricinfo, 4 July 2025

Rashmika Sewwandi Hewalanka Geeganage (born 21 October 2006, known as Rashmika Sewwandi) is a Sri Lankan cricketer who plays for the Sri Lanka women's cricket team as a left-hand batter and right-arm fast bowler. She has also played for Sri Lanka women's under-19 cricket team.

== Career ==
In January 2023, Sewwandi was named in Sri Lanka's squad for the 2023 Under-19 Women's T20 World Cup.

In June 2024, she was named in Sri Lanka national team for the series against the West Indies. In September 2024, she named in under-19 squad for the Tri-Series against New Zealand under-19 and Australia under-19 team. She scored unbeaten 36 and took two wickets against New Zealand under-19 cricket team and Sri Lanka under-19 team registered 69 run victory over New Zealand.

In December 2024, she was named in under-19 squad for the 2024 ACC Under-19 Women's T20 Asia Cup. In January 2025, she also named in national under-19 cricket team squad for the 2025 Under-19 Women's T20 World Cup, as vice-captain of the side. She played four games in that tournament.

In February 2025, Sewwandi named in ODI and T20I squad for the series against New Zealand. She made her T20I debut in the same series on 18 March 2025. In April 2025, she was named in Sri Lanka national team for the ODI Tri-Nation series against India and South Africa.
