= Paris Hall =

Australian cricketer

Personal information
- Born: 10 November 2003 (age 23); Adelaide, South Australia, Australia
- Batting: Left-handed
- Role: Wicket-keeper

Domestic team information
- Years: Team
- 2022/23–present: South Australia (squad no. 23)
- 2024/25–present: Adelaide Strikers (squad no. 23)

Career statistics
Competition	WLA	WT20
Matches	2	3
Runs scored	2	32
Batting average	2.00	32.00
100s/50s	0/0	0/0
Top score	2	32*
Catches/stumpings	1/2	1/5
- Source: CricketArchive, 20 October 2024

Paris Hall is an Australian cricketer who currently plays for South Australia in the Women's National Cricket League (WNCL) and the Adelaide Strikers in the Women's Big Bash League (WBBL). She plays as a wicket-keeper and left-handed batter.

== Domestic career ==
In May 2022, Hall received her first contract, signing with South Australia for the upcoming WNCL season. In December 2022, she played for South Australia in the Cricket Australia Under-19 National Female Championships, scoring one half-century. On 18 December 2022, Hall made her debut for South Australia's senior team, taking one catch keeping wicket, although she did not bat in her side's 98-run victory over ACT Meteors.

Hall plays grade cricket for West Torrens Cricket Club, and was the side's First-Grade leading run-scorer in the 2021–22 season.

== International career ==
In December 2022, Hall was named as a non-travelling reserve for the Australia Under-19 squad for the 2023 ICC Under-19 Women's T20 World Cup. She was later added to the side's full squad after two players were injured after the first round of matches, and went on to play three matches at the tournament.
