= Emma McLeod =

New Zealand cricketer (born 2006)

Personal information
- Full name: Emma Mary Amanda McLeod
- Born: 28 March 2006 (age 20); Masterton, New Zealand
- Batting: Right-handed
- Bowling: Right-arm off-break
- Role: All-rounder

International information
- National side: New Zealand
- ODI debut (cap 151): 4 March 2025 v Sri Lanka
- Last ODI: 9 March 2025 v Sri Lanka
- ODI shirt no.: 2
- T20I debut (cap 70): 14 March 2025 v Sri Lanka
- Last T20I: 18 March 2025 v Sri Lanka
- T20I shirt no.: 2

Domestic team information
- Years: Team
- 2022/23–present: Central Districts (squad no. 21)

Career statistics
Competition	ODI	T20I	LA	T20
Matches	3	3	30	9
Runs scored	10	59	631	120
Batting average	5.00	19.66	24.26	15.00
100s/50s	0/0	0/0	0/3	0/0
Top score	6	44	68*	44
Balls bowled	–	–	144	–
Wickets	–	–	4	–
Bowling average	–	–	35.50	–
5 wickets in innings	–	–	0	–
10 wickets in match	–	–	0	–
Best bowling	–	–	2/47	–
Catches/stumpings	2/–	0/–	7/–	1/–
- Source: Cricinfo, 2 August 2025

Emma Mary Amanda McLeod (born 28 March 2006) is a New Zealand cricketer who currently plays for the New Zealand women's cricket team internationally, and Central Districts in domestic cricket. She plays as a right-handed batter.

== Career ==
In December 2022, McLeod was selected in the New Zealand Under-19 squad for the 2023 Under-19 Women's T20 World Cup. McLeod played for Central Districts in the Hallyburton Johnstone Shield and Super Smash.

McLeod signed her for first professional contract with Central Hinds in August 2023. She made her List A debut against Canterbury in the 2022–23 Hallyburton Johnstone Shield, on 18 February 2023. She scored a half century (59 off 39 balls) against Rwanda in the Super Six round.

She made her T20 debut against Otago in the 2023–24 Super Smash, on 19 January 2024. In November 2024, she was named as captain of Under-19 side for the 2024/25 season.

In January 2025, she also named in national under-19 cricket team squad for the 2025 Under-19 Women's T20 World Cup.

In February 2025, McLeod earned maiden call-up for New Zealand national cricket team for the ODI and T20I series against Sri Lanka. She made her ODI debut on 4 March 2025, and made her T20I debut on 14 March 2025 against Sri Lanka. She scored 44 runs off 46 balls on her T20I debut.

In June 2025, she was named in New Zealand A squad against England A.

== Awards ==
In April 2024, McLeod got Women's Young Players of the Year award.
