= Emma Black (cricketer) =

New Zealand cricketer (born 2001)

Personal information
- Full name: Emma Jordan Black
- Born: 8 August 2001 (age 25); Dunedin, Otago, New Zealand
- Batting: Right-handed
- Bowling: Right-arm medium
- Role: Bowler

Domestic team information
- Years: Team
- 2017/18–present: Otago

Career statistics
Competition	List A	Twenty20
Matches	77	79
Runs scored	288	94
Batting average	8.00	5.43
100s/50s	0/0	0/0
Top score	36	16
Balls bowled	3,429	1,562
Wickets	100	87
Bowling average	25.68	20.13
5 wickets in innings	1	0
10 wickets in match	0	0
Best bowling	5/28	4/14
Catches/stumpings	7/–	20/–
- Source: Cricinfo, 4 July 2025

Emma Jordan Black (born 8 August 2001) is a New Zealand cricketer, who plays for Otago in domestic cricket as a right-arm medium fast bowler.

== Career ==
Black played for Otago in Hallyburton Johnstone Shield and Super Smash. She made her List A debut against Northern Districts in the 2017–18 Hallyburton Johnstone Shield, on 28 December 2017. She made her T20 debut against Northern Districts in the 2017–18 New Zealand Women's Twenty20 Competition, on 27 December 2017.

Black took her first five-wicket haul in List A cricket, on 30 October 2021, against Central Hinds. She also played three finals of Hallyburton Johnstone Shield. She was highest wicket-taker in the 2023–24 Hallyburton Johnstone Shield season. She work on her bowling and getting more speed in 2023.

In March 2024, she was named in the New Zealand A One-Day squad against England A. In March 2025, she was earned maiden call-up for national team for the ODI series against Sri Lanka as a cover for Hannah Rowe. In June 2025, she was again named in New Zealand A squad against England A.

== Awards ==
In March 2024, Black got Women's Domestic Player of the Year and Women's Domestic Bowler of the Year award.
