= Flora Devonshire =

New Zealand cricketer (born 2003)

- Devonshire in 2026

Personal information
- Full name: Flora Diana Mary Devonshire
- Born: 13 February 2003 (age 23); Hastings, Hawke's Bay, New Zealand
- Nickname: Flo, Flocean
- Batting: Left-handed
- Bowling: Slow left-arm orthodox
- Role: All-rounder

International information
- National side: New Zealand
- Only ODI (cap 154): 29 March 2026 v South Africa
- T20I debut (cap 72): 16 March 2025 v Sri Lanka
- Last T20I: 18 March 2025 v Sri Lanka
- T20I shirt no.: 27

Domestic team information
- Years: Team
- 2022/23–present: Central Districts (squad no. 26)

Career statistics
Competition	T20I	LA	T20
Matches	2	31	39
Runs scored	–	455	281
Batting average	–	18.95	13.38
100s/50s	–	0/4	0/0
Top score	–	73*	39
Balls bowled	12	842	463
Wickets	1	28	18
Bowling average	12.00	25.64	28.16
5 wickets in innings	0	1	0
10 wickets in match	0	0	0
Best bowling	1/12	5/22	4/20
Catches/stumpings	0/–	6/–	8/–
- Source: Cricinfo, 29 March 2026

Flora Diana Mary Devonshire (born 13 February 2003) is a New Zealand cricketer who currently plays for the New Zealand women's cricket team internationally, and Central Districts in domestic cricket. She plays as a left-handed batter and left-arm medium-fast bowler.

== Career ==
In November 2022, Devonshire was named in the New Zealand under-19 cricket team (New Zealand Development squad) to play two T20 matches against the West Indies women's under-19 cricket team and five T20 matches against the India women's under-19 cricket team.

Devonshire played for Central Districts in the Hallyburton Johnstone Shield and Super Smash. She made her List A debut against Otago in the 2022–23 Hallyburton Johnstone Shield, on 22 January 2023. She made her T20 debut against Wellington in the 2022–23 Super Smash, on 27 December 2022.

In March 2024, Devonshire was named in the New Zealand A T20 squad to play England A. In December 2024, she took her maiden five-wicket haul in List A cricket in the 2024–25 Hallyburton Johnstone Shield.

In March 2025, Devonshire earned her maiden call-up for the national team as a replacement for the T20I series against Sri Lanka. She made her T20I debut in the that series on 16 March 2025. In June 2025, she was again named in New Zealand A squad against England A.

In September 2025, Devonshire was named in New Zealand One Day squad for 2025 Women's Cricket World Cup.
