= Bree Illing =

New Zealand cricketer (born 2003)

Personal information
- Full name: Breearne Grace Illing
- Born: 29 September 2003 (age 23); Auckland, New Zealand
- Batting: Left-handed
- Bowling: Left-arm medium
- Role: Bowler

International information
- National side: New Zealand
- ODI debut (cap 149): 4 March 2025 v Sri Lanka
- Last ODI: 9 March 2025 v Sri Lanka
- ODI shirt no.: 92
- T20I debut (cap 68): 14 March 2025 v Sri Lanka
- Last T20I: 18 March 2025 v Sri Lanka
- T20I shirt no.: 92

Domestic team information
- Years: Team
- 2021/22–present: Auckland

Career statistics
Competition	ODI	T20I	LA	T20
Matches	3	3	30	26
Runs scored	–	1	46	6
Batting average	–	–	15.33	–
100s/50s	–	0/0	0/0	0/0
Top score	–	1*	11*	4*
Balls bowled	168	42	1,496	552
Wickets	4	2	46	18
Bowling average	29.25	24.50	26.02	32.22
5 wickets in innings	0	0	0	0
10 wickets in match	0	0	0	0
Best bowling	2/42	2/18	4/39	2/12
Catches/stumpings	1/–	0/–	5/–	2/–
- Source: Cricinfo, 31 July 2025

Breearne Grace Illing (born 29 September 2003) is a New Zealand cricketer who currently plays for the New Zealand women's cricket team internationally, and Auckland in domestic cricket. She plays as a left-handed batter and left-arm medium-fast bowler.

== Early life ==
Illing was graduated from the University of Auckland with a Bachelor of Science. She worked as a media archiver at Mainfreight with her father. She played for Cornwall Club in club cricket.

== Career ==
Illing played for Auckland in the Hallyburton Johnstone Shield and Super Smash. She made her List A debut against Canterbury in the 2021–22 Hallyburton Johnstone Shield, on 12 February 2022.

In November 2022, Illing was named in the New Zealand under-19 cricket team (New Zealand Development squad) to play two T20 matches against the West Indies women's under-19 cricket team and five T20 matches against the India women's under-19 cricket team.

In December 2022, Illing was selected in the New Zealand Under-19 squad for the 2023 Under-19 Women's T20 World Cup. Later she was ruled out of the tournament due to injury.

She made her T20 debut against Canterbury in the 2023–24 Super Smash, on 19 December 2023. In March 2024, she was named in the New Zealand A T20 squad against England A.

In February 2025, she was earned maiden call-up for New Zealand national cricket team for the ODI series against Sri Lanka. Later she was named in T20I squad for the same series as a replacement. She made her ODI debut on 4 March 2025, and made her T20I debut on 14 March 2025 against Sri Lanka. She took two wickets in second T20I against Sri Lanka and played a crucial role for her team to level the series.

In June 2025, she was again named in New Zealand A squad against England A. In the same month she was awarded her maiden central contract by New Zealand Cricket for 2025–26 season.

== Awards ==
In April 2024, Illing got Women's Young Cricketers of the Year award.
