= Bella James =

New Zealand cricketer (born 1999)

Personal information
- Full name: Isabella Rose James
- Born: 27 January 1999 (age 27); Timaru, South Canterbury, New Zealand
- Batting: Right-handed
- Role: Wicket-keeper

International information
- National side: New Zealand
- ODI debut (cap 148): 21 December 2024 v Australia
- Last ODI: 23 December 2024 v Australia
- ODI shirt no.: 11
- Only T20I (cap 73): 26 March 2025 v Australia
- T20I shirt no.: 11

Domestic team information
- Years: Team
- 2014/15–present: Otago

Career statistics
Competition	WODI	WT20I	WLA	WT20
Matches	2	1	78	65
Runs scored	51	14	1,269	494
Batting average	5.50	14.00	19.22	12.35
100s/50s	0/0	0/0	2/4	0/0
Top score	27	14	101*	39
Catches/stumpings	1/0	1/0	26/0	21/0
- Source: ESPNcricinfo, 6 March 2023

Isabella Rose James (born 27 January 1999) is a New Zealand cricketer who currently plays for New Zealand women's cricket team and Otago in domestic cricket. She plays as a right-handed batter and wicket-keeper.

== Early life ==
She was completed her schooling at Arrowtown Primary School in Arrowtown, New Zealand. She started her career in the Secondary Schools Girls Finals. In the second year she was joined Otago Sparks at top level cricket and was guided by Suzie Bates and Katey Martin. She was the top scorer of the Secondary Girls Finals, with 191 runs and received Secondary Schools Girls’ Young Cricketer of the Year award. She became the first female to receive the Otago Cricket Scholarship. She developed her cricketing ability at St Hilda’s Collegiate under Neil Rosenberg, former coach at the school.

== Career ==
James played for Otago in Hallyburton Johnstone Shield and Super Smash. She made her List A debut against Canterbury in the 2014–15 New Zealand Women's One-Day Competition on 13 December 2014. She made her T20 debut against Canterbury in the 2014–15 New Zealand Women's Twenty20 Competition on 12 December 2014.

She scored her first List A century (101) in 2022–23 Hallyburton Johnstone Shield against Central Hinds on 22 January 2023. She scored unbeaten 101 runs against Wellington Blaze on 30 November 2024 in the 2024–25 Hallyburton Johnstone Shield.

In August 2024, she was awarded domestic contract for Otago by New Zealand Cricket for 2024–25 season. In December 2024, she earned maiden call-up for national team for the ODI series against Australia. She made her ODI debut against Australia on 21 December 2024. In February 2025, James ruled out of the white-ball series against Sri Lanka due to hip flexor. She made her T20I debut against Australia on 26 March 2025.

In June 2025, she was again named in New Zealand A squad against England A. In same month she awarded her maiden central contract by NZC for the 2025–26 season.
