= Georgia Plimmer =

New Zealand cricketer (born 2004)

Personal information
- Full name: Georgia Ellen Plimmer
- Born: 8 February 2004 (age 22); Wellington, New Zealand
- Batting: Right-handed
- Bowling: Right-arm medium
- Role: Batter

International information
- National side: New Zealand
- ODI debut (cap 146): 25 September 2022 v West Indies
- Last ODI: 29 October 2024 v India
- T20I debut (cap 61): 6 August 2022 v Australia
- Last T20I: 20 October 2024 v South Africa
- T20I shirt no.: 58

Domestic team information
- Years: Team
- 2019/20–present: Wellington

Career statistics
Competition	WODI	WT20I
Matches	31	45
Runs scored	504	588
Batting average	21.91	17.81
100s/50s	1/0	0/3
Top score	112	63
Catches/stumpings	10/–	12/–
Medal record
Women's cricket
Representing New Zealand
ICC T20 World Cup
Winner	2024 UAE
Commonwealth Games
Bronze medal – third place	2022 Birmingham
- Source: , 29 October 2024

Georgia Ellen Plimmer (born 8 February 2004) is a New Zealand cricketer who plays for Wellington Blaze and the New Zealand women's cricket team as a right-handed batter.

== Early life ==
Plimmer went to Tawa College, along with four other NZ Women's cricket players (Amelia and Jess Kerr, Sophie Devine, and Rebecca Burns).

== Career ==
In February 2022, she was named in New Zealand's squad for the 2022 Women's Cricket World Cup as a replacement for injured Lauren Down. In May 2022, she was named in New Zealand Women's central contract list for the 2022–23 season.

Plimmer made her List A debut for Wellington in the 2019–20 Hallyburton Johnstone Shield. She made her T20 debut for Wellington in the 2020–21 Super Smash.

In June 2022, Plimmer was named in New Zealand's team for the cricket tournament at the 2022 Commonwealth Games in Birmingham, England. Plimmer made her Women's Twenty20 International (WT20I) debut for New Zealand against Australia on 6 August 2022 at the Commonwealth Games. She made her One Day International debut against the West Indies on 25 September 2022.

In December 2022, Plimmer was selected in the New Zealand Under-19 squad for the 2023 ICC Under-19 Women's T20 World Cup. She was New Zealand's leading run-scorer in the tournament, with 155 runs at an average of 51.66. In January 2023, Plimmer was selected in New Zealand's squad for the 2023 ICC Women's T20 World Cup, in which she made three appearances.

In September 2024 she was named in the New Zealand squad for the 2024 ICC Women's T20 World Cup.

Plimmer was named in the New Zealand squad for their ODI tour to India in October 2024. On 9 March 2025, she scored her first century in ODIs, with 112 runs against Sri Lanka.
