= Brooke Halliday =

New Zealand cricketer (born 1995)

Personal information
- Full name: Brooke Maree Halliday
- Born: 30 October 1995 (age 31); Hamilton, New Zealand
- Batting: Left-handed
- Bowling: Right-arm medium
- Role: All-rounder

International information
- National side: New Zealand
- ODI debut (cap 141): 23 February 2021 v England
- Last ODI: 8 March 2026 v Zimbabwe
- T20I debut (cap 51): 3 March 2021 v England
- Last T20I: 1 March 2026 v Zimbabwe
- T20I shirt no.: 68

Domestic team information
- Years: Team
- 2012/13–2022/23: Northern Districts
- 2023/24–present: Auckland

Career statistics
Competition	WODI	WT20I
Matches	56	66
Runs scored	1462	684
Batting average	34.00	16.28
100s/50s	1/9	0/0
Top score	157*	46*
Balls bowled	312	100
Wickets	8	8
Bowling average	36.12	14.12
5 wickets in innings	0	0
10 wickets in match	0	0
Best bowling	1/11	2/11
Catches/stumpings	16/–	9/–
Medal record
Women's cricket
Representing New Zealand
ICC T20 World Cup
Winner	2024 UAE
Commonwealth Games
Bronze medal – third place	2022 Birmingham
- Source: Cricinfo, 22 October 2026

Brooke Maree Halliday (born 30 October 1995) is a New Zealand cricketer who currently plays for Auckland and New Zealand.

== Playing career ==
In February 2021, after having played nine seasons for Northern Districts, and in the middle of a breakthrough season as one of the top-scoring batter in the country, Halliday earned her maiden call-up to the New Zealand squad, for their Women's One Day International (WODI) matches against England. As part of the preparation for the series, she played in a warm-up match for the New Zealand XI Women's team, scoring 79 runs from 56 balls. She made her WODI debut for New Zealand, against England, on 23 February 2021.

On 1 March 2021, Halliday was added to New Zealand's Women's Twenty20 International (WT20I) squad, also for the matches against England. The following day, Halliday was one of the three nominees for the Women's Player of the Month in the ICC Player of the Month Awards. She made her WT20I debut for New Zealand, against England, on 3 March 2021. In May 2021, Halliday was awarded with her first central contract from New Zealand Cricket ahead of the 2021–22 season. In February 2022, she was named in New Zealand's team for the 2022 Women's Cricket World Cup in New Zealand. In June 2022, Halliday was named in New Zealand's team for the cricket tournament at the 2022 Commonwealth Games in Birmingham, England.

In September 2024, she was named in the New Zealand squad for the 2024 ICC Women's T20 World Cup. Halliday scored a career-best 38 off 28 balls and took 1/4 from her single over in the final against South Africa as New Zealand won the tournament.

Halliday was named in the New Zealand squad for their ODI tour to India in October 2024.
