= Amelia Kerr =

New Zealand cricketer (born 2000)

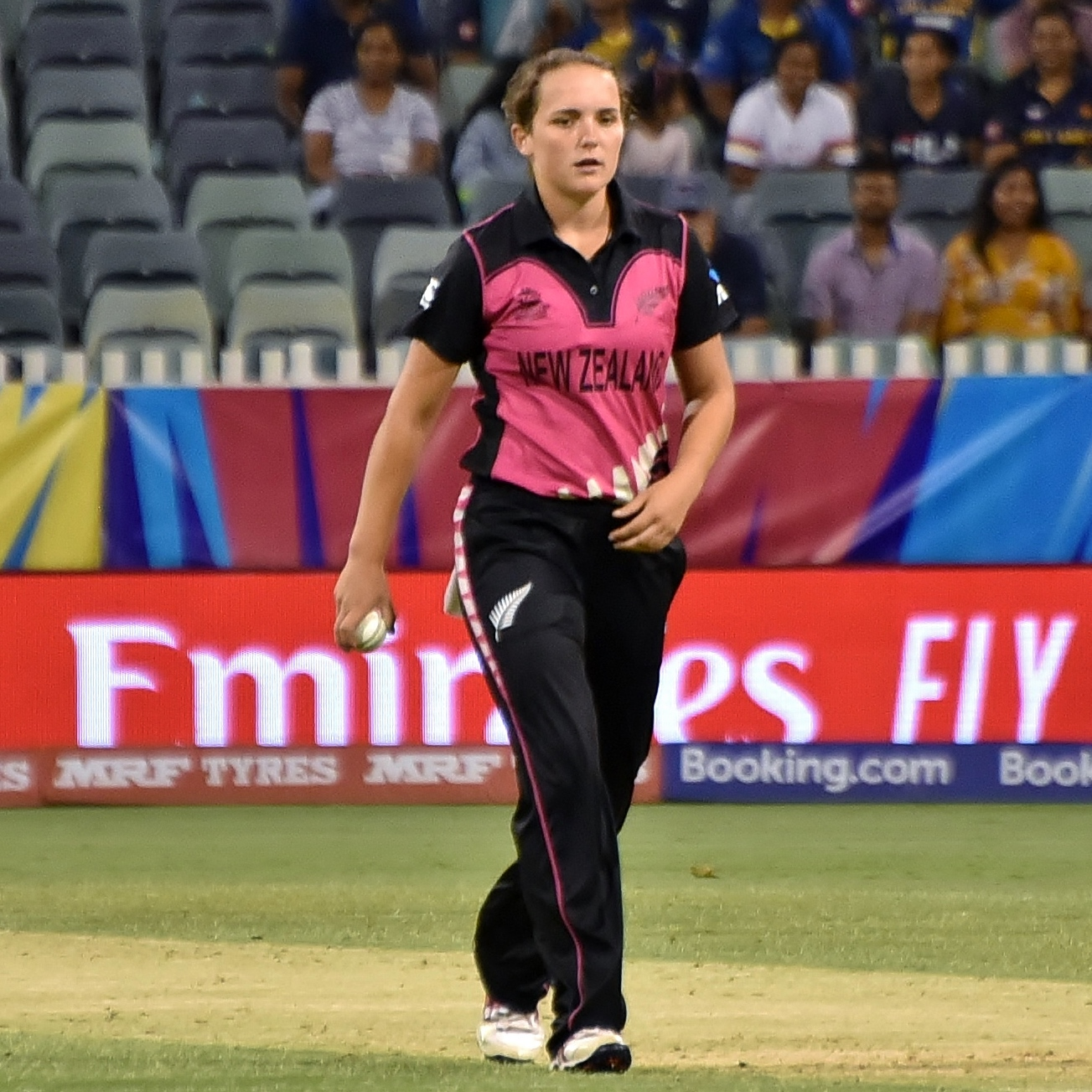
- Kerr at the 2020 ICC Women's T20 World Cup

Personal information
- Full name: Amelia Charlotte Kerr
- Born: 13 October 2000 (age 26); Wellington, New Zealand
- Batting: Right-handed
- Bowling: Right-arm leg break
- Role: All-rounder
- Relatives: Jess Kerr (sister); Robbie Kerr (father); Bruce Murray (grandfather)

International information
- National side: New Zealand (2016–present)
- ODI debut (cap 135): 9 November 2016 v Pakistan
- Last ODI: 4 April 2026 v South Africa
- ODI shirt no.: 48
- T20I debut (cap 49): 21 November 2016 v Pakistan
- Last T20I: 25 March 2026 v South Africa
- T20I shirt no.: 48

Domestic team information
- Years: Team
- 2014/15–present: Wellington
- 2018: Southern Vipers
- 2019: Velocity
- 2019/20–2023/24: Brisbane Heat
- 2022–2023: London Spirit
- 2023–present: Mumbai Indians
- 2024/25–present: Sydney Sixers
- 2025: Manchester Originals
- 2026: MI London

Career statistics
Competition	WODI	WT20I
Matches	90	96
Runs scored	2,659	1,912
Batting average	43.59	32.96
100s/50s	5/11	2/7
Top score	232*	105
Balls bowled	4,531	2,069
Wickets	126	104
Bowling average	27.15	20.12
5 wickets in innings	3	0
10 wickets in match	0	0
Best bowling	7/34	4/20
Catches/stumpings	47/–	49/–
Medal record
Women's cricket
Representing New Zealand
ICC T20 World Cup
Winner	2024 UAE
Commonwealth Games
Bronze medal – third place	2022 Birmingham
- Source: ESPNcricinfo, 30 March 2026

Amelia Charlotte Kerr (born 13 October 2000) is a New Zealand cricketer and the captain of the New Zealand women's national team. She is the youngest female cricketer to score a double century in One Day International cricket and holds the record for the highest individual score in a women's One Day International match. Kerr was named player of the tournament at the 2024 Women's T20 World Cup after helping New Zealand win the trophy for the first time.

== Career ==
On 13 June 2018, Kerr made the women's ODI, and became the youngest cricketer, male or female, to score a double century in One Day International cricket, when she scored 232 not out against Ireland. The double century was also the third-highest individual score, male or female, in an ODI, second-highest by a New Zealander and highest in a Women's ODI. Later in the same match, she also took five wickets for 17 runs, her first five-wicket haul in WODIs.

In August 2018, she was awarded a central contract by New Zealand Cricket, following the tours of Ireland and England in the previous months. In October 2018, she was named in New Zealand's squad for the 2018 ICC Women's World Twenty20 tournament in the West Indies. Ahead of the tournament, she was named as the player to watch in the team.

In March 2019, she was named as the ANZ International Women's ODI Player of the Year at the annual New Zealand Cricket awards. In January 2020, she was named in New Zealand's squad for the 2020 ICC Women's T20 World Cup in Australia. In February 2022, she was named in New Zealand's team for the 2022 Women's Cricket World Cup in New Zealand.

In April 2022, she was signed by the London Spirit for the 2022 season of The Hundred at a salary band of £25,000.

In June 2022, Kerr was named in New Zealand's team for the cricket tournament at the 2022 Commonwealth Games in Birmingham, England.

In the inaugural season of the Women's Premier League in 2023, Kerr was bought by Mumbai Indians at the price of ₹1 Crore.

In March 2024, in the absence of Sophie Devine. Kerr was named as the captain of New Zealand in One Day International for home series against England.

In September 2024 she was named in the New Zealand squad for the 2024 ICC Women's T20 World Cup.

In the 2024 Women's T20 World Cup final against South Africa, her 43 off 38 and 3/24 led her team to win their maiden Women's T20 World Cup and she was the Player of the Match in the finals. She became the first female player to named as player of the final and player of tournament in the ICC Women's T20 World Cup.

Kerr was named in the New Zealand squad for their ODI tour to India in October 2024. She tore her left quadriceps muscle in the first match and was subsequently ruled out of the rest of the series.

She was among the four player shortlists for the Women's Cricketer of the Year and Women's T20I Cricketer of the Year in the 2024 ICC Awards

In 2025, Amelia Kerr became one of The Hundred's first-ever direct signings, joining the Manchester Originals for the 2025 The Hundred season at a salary band of £65,000.

In 2026, Kerr was announced as the White Ferns' captain, succeeding Devine, who stepped down after the previous year's World Cup.

In March 2026, Kerr took a hat-trick in a WODI against Zimbabwe, becoming the third New Zealand women's player to achieve the feat.

In April 2026, Kerr scored 179 not out in a WODI against South Africa, taking her team to the highest successful run chase in the history of women's ODI's.

== Personal life ==
Kerr's mother Jo and father Robbie both played cricket at domestic level representing Wellington. Her elder sister Jess, who plays for Wellington was, in January 2020, named in New Zealand's national cricket squad against South Africa women. Her grandfather, Bruce Murray, played Test cricket for New Zealand. Her cousin, Cilla Duncan, represented New Zealand (Football Ferns) at international football.

Jess is a teacher at Tawa Intermediate, of which both of the two sisters are alumnae, and Amelia became a teacher aide for autistic students.

Kerr is in a relationship with fellow New Zealand international cricketer Nathan Smith. The couple met while playing for Wellington Blaze and Wellington cricket team, respectively, in 2021–22. Since then, their profiles have risen substantially: by 2026, Kerr was captaining the defending champions in the 2026 Women's T20 World Cup, Smith was starring in that season's New Zealand men's team's Test tour of England, and the two players were being described by ESPNcricinfo as "New Zealand cricket's power couple".

== Honours ==
Velocity

- Women's T20 Challenge runner-up: 2019

Brisbane Heat

- Women's Big Bash League: 2019–20; runner-up: 2023–24

Mumbai Indians

- Women's Premier League: 2023, 2025

New Zealand

- Commonwealth Games bronze medal: 2022
- ICC T20 World Cup: 2024

Individual

- ICC Women's Player of the Month: February 2022, October 2024
- Rachael Heyhoe Flint Award: 2024
- ICC Women's T20I Cricketer of the Year: 2024
- ICC T20 World Cup – Player of the Tournament: 2024
