= Izzy Gaze =

New Zealand cricketer

Personal information
- Full name: Isabella Charli Gaze
- Born: 8 May 2004 (age 22); Haarlem, Netherlands
- Batting: Right-handed
- Role: Wicket-keeper

International information
- National side: New Zealand
- ODI debut (cap 144): 19 September 2022 v West Indies
- Last ODI: 18 December 2023 v Pakistan
- T20I debut (cap 59): 30 July 2022 v South Africa
- Last T20I: 11 July 2024 v England
- T20I shirt no.: 13

Domestic team information
- Years: Team
- 2019/20–present: Auckland

Career statistics
Competition	WODI	WT20I	WLA	WT20
Matches	3	10	17	28
Runs scored	7	35	107	165
Batting average	3.50	11.66	8.91	11.78
100s/50s	0/0	0/0	0/0	0/0
Top score	6	16	26	26
Catches/stumpings	5/0	7/1	9/1	11/4
Medal record
Women's cricket
Representing New Zealand
ICC T20 World Cup
Winner	2024 UAE
Commonwealth Games
Bronze medal – third place	2022 Birmingham
- Source: CricketArchive, 6 March 2023

Isabella Charli Gaze (born 8 May 2004) is a Dutch-born New Zealand cricketer who plays as a wicket-keeper and right-handed batter for Auckland Hearts and the New Zealand women's cricket team.

== Early life ==
Gaze was born on 8 May 2004 in Haarlem in the Netherlands. She lived in the Netherlands for 18 months before moving to Hong Kong, then Singapore, and finally to Auckland, New Zealand. At the age of 18, Gaze went to university and worked part-time after the domestic cricket season in New Zealand had ended.

== Domestic career ==
Gaze made her debut for Auckland in 2019, against Wellington in the 2019–20 Super Smash. She missed much of the 2020–21 season due to a collarbone fracture.

== International career ==
Gaze was part of a New Zealand camp ahead of the side's series against India and the 2022 World Cup. Following the retirement of New Zealand wicket-keeper Katey Martin after the World Cup, Gaze was awarded a central contract by New Zealand Cricket.

Gaze earned her first call-up to the full New Zealand side in June 2022, when she was selected in the squad for the 2022 Commonwealth Games. She made her Twenty20 International debut on 30 July 2022, against South Africa in New Zealand's first match at the Commonwealth Games. She made her One Day International debut on 19 September 2022, on New Zealand's tour of the West Indies.

In December 2022, Gaze was selected in the New Zealand Under-19 squad for the 2023 ICC Under-19 Women's T20 World Cup. She scored 47 runs in her three innings at the tournament.

In September 2024 she was named in the New Zealand squad for the 2024 ICC Women's T20 World Cup.

Gaze was named in the New Zealand squad for their ODI tour to India in October 2024.
