= Izzy Sharp (cricketer) =

New Zealand cricketer (born 2004)

Personal information
- Full name: Isobel Grace Sharp
- Born: 1 December 2004 (age 21); Timaru, Canterbury, New Zealand
- Batting: Right-handed
- Role: Wicket-keeper batter

International information
- National side: New Zealand
- ODI debut (cap 153): 5 March 2026 v Zimbabwe
- Last ODI: 8 March 2026 v Zimbabwe
- ODI shirt no.: 44
- T20I debut (cap 71): 14 March 2025 v Sri Lanka
- Last T20I: 18 March 2025 v Sri Lanka
- T20I shirt no.: 44

Domestic team information
- Years: Team
- 2021/22–present: Canterbury

Career statistics
Competition	T20I	LA	T20
Matches	3	32	32
Runs scored	25	514	320
Batting average	25.00	19.76	12.30
100s/50s	–	0/0	0/1
Top score	17*	45	52
Catches/stumpings	0/–	5/–	7/–
- Source: Cricinfo, 29 July 2025

Isobel Grace Sharp (born 1 December 2004) is a New Zealand cricketer who currently plays for the New Zealand women's cricket team internationally, and Canterbury in domestic cricket. She plays as a right-handed batter wicket-keeper.

== Early life ==
Sharp played various sports in her teenage years with her siblings and she hated to play soccer. Sam and William are her older brother, Jessica is her sister, Kerri and Graham are her mother and father respectively. In 2017, she played hockey in local tournaments.

== Career ==
Sharp played for Canterbury in the Hallyburton Johnstone Shield and Super Smash. She made her List A debut against Northern Districts in the 2021–22 Hallyburton Johnstone Shield, on 5 February 2022. She made her T20 debut against Auckland in the 2022–23 Super Smash, on 26 December 2022.

In December 2022, Sharp was selected in the New Zealand Under-19 squad for the 2023 Under-19 Women's T20 World Cup, as captain of the side. She also plays club cricket for North-West Women's Cricket which is the Women's section of the Burnside West Christchurch University Cricket Club in the Christchurch Metro Cricket Competition.

In February 2025, she was earned maiden call-up for New Zealand national cricket team for the T20I series against Sri Lanka. Later she was named in ODI squad for the same series as a replacement of Lauren Down. She made her T20I debut on 14 March 2025 against Sri Lanka.

In June 2025, Sharp named in New Zealand A squad against England A.

In April 2026 she was named in the 15 player New Zealand White ferns squad for the 2026 Women's T20 World Cup and the 12 of June 2026 it was announced that she received her first central contract for the New Zealand women's national cricket team for the 2026/2027 season.
