= Jess Kerr =

New Zealand cricketer

Personal information
- Full name: Jessica Mackenzie Kerr
- Born: 18 January 1998 (age 28); Wellington, New Zealand
- Batting: Right-handed
- Bowling: Right-arm medium
- Role: Bowler
- Relatives: Amelia Kerr (younger sister); Robbie Kerr (father); Jo Murray (mother); Bruce Murray (grandfather)

International information
- National side: New Zealand (2020–present)
- ODI debut (cap 140): 27 January 2020 v South Africa
- Last ODI: 26 October 2025 v England
- T20I debut (cap 56): 9 February 2020 v South Africa
- Last T20I: 26 March 2025 v Australia
- T20I shirt no.: 24

Domestic team information
- Years: Team
- 2016/17–present: Wellington
- 2022/23: Brisbane Heat
- 2023/24: Sydney Sixers

Career statistics
Competition	WODI	WT20I
Matches	48	48
Runs scored	308	167
Batting average	11.00	11.92
100s/50s	0/0	0/0
Top score	38	38
Balls bowled	2,162	928
Wickets	64	36
Bowling average	24.48	27.5
5 wickets in innings	0	0
10 wickets in match	0	0
Best bowling	4/23	3/16
Catches/stumpings	11/–	9/–
Medal record
Representing New Zealand
Women's Cricket
T20 World Cup
Winner	2024 UAE
- Source: ESPNcricinfo, 26 January 2026

Jessica Mackenzie Kerr (born 18 January 1998) is a New Zealand cricketer who plays for Wellington Blaze in domestic cricket.

== Career ==
On 16 January 2020, she was named in New Zealand's Women's Twenty20 International (WT20I) and Women's One Day International (WODI) squad against South Africa. She made her WODI debut for New Zealand on 27 January 2020. Later the same month, she was named in New Zealand's squad for the 2020 ICC Women's T20 World Cup in Australia. She made her WT20I debut for New Zealand, against South Africa, on 9 February 2020. In June 2020, Kerr was awarded with a central contract by New Zealand Cricket ahead of the 2020–21 season.

In February 2022, she was named in New Zealand's team for the 2022 Women's Cricket World Cup in New Zealand. In June 2022, Kerr was named in New Zealand's team for the cricket tournament at the 2022 Commonwealth Games in Birmingham, England, but was later ruled out of the tournament.

In September 2024 she was named in the New Zealand squad for the 2024 ICC Women's T20 World Cup.

Kerr was named in the New Zealand squad for their ODI tour to India in October 2024.

== Family ==
Kerr's mother Jo and father Robbie both played cricket at domestic level representing Wellington. Her younger sister is Amelia Kerr, who plays for New Zealand. Her grandfather, Bruce Murray, played Test cricket for New Zealand. Her cousin, Priscilla Duncan, represented New Zealand (Football Ferns) at international football.

== Outside cricket ==
Jess is a teacher in Tawa Intermediate, her and Amelia's former school, where Amelia is a teacher aide for autistic students.
