= Maddy Green =

New Zealand cricketer (born 1992)

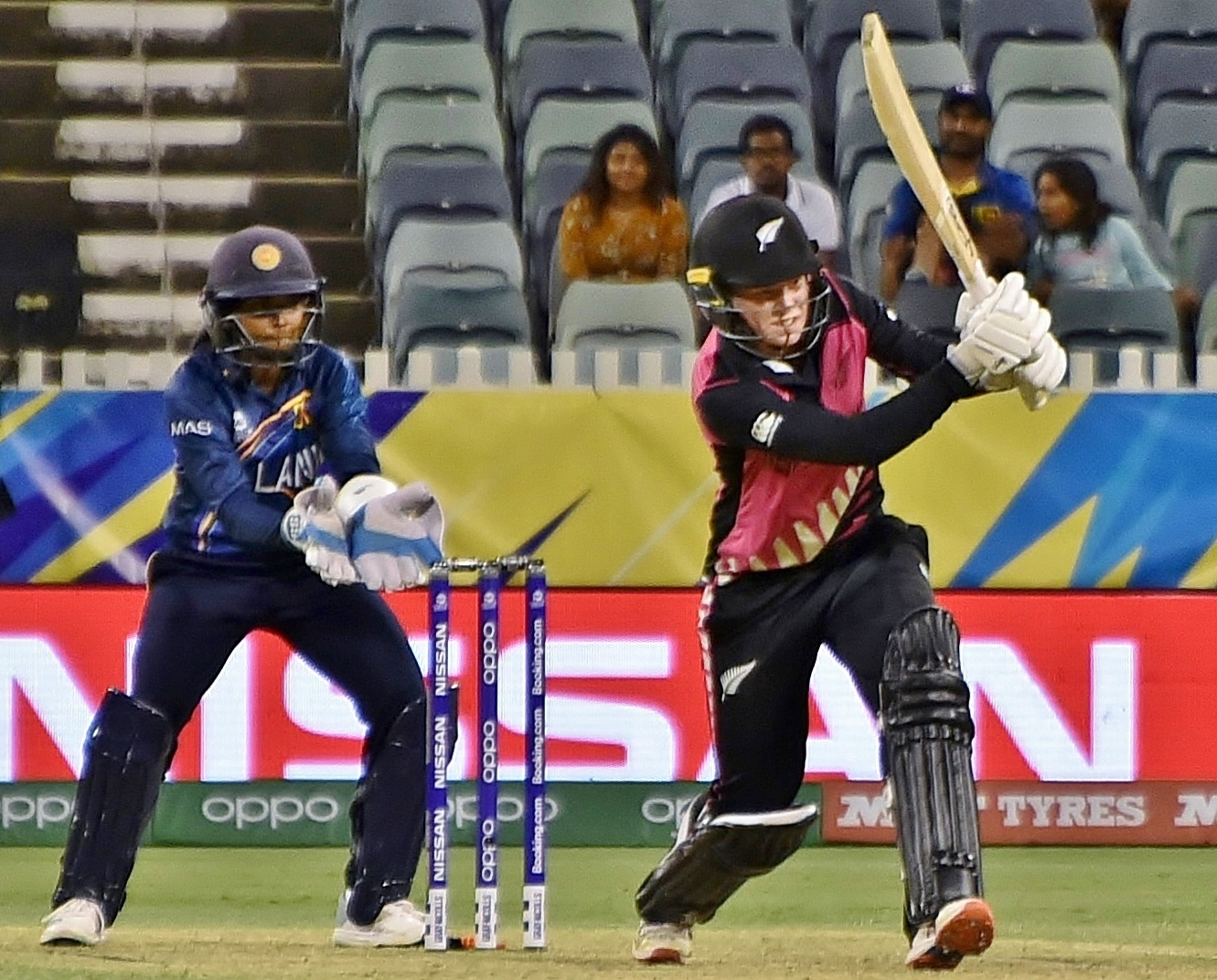
- Green at the 2020 T20 World Cup

Personal information
- Full name: Madeline Lee Green
- Born: 20 October 1992 (age 34); Auckland, New Zealand
- Batting: Right-handed
- Bowling: Right-arm off break
- Role: Batter
- Relatives: Liz Perry (wife)

International information
- National side: New Zealand (2012–present)
- ODI debut (cap 129): 26 February 2014 v West Indies
- Last ODI: 29 October 2024 v India
- T20I debut (cap 38): 1 February 2012 v Australia
- Last T20I: 20 October 2024 v South Africa
- T20I shirt no.: 5

Domestic team information
- Years: Team
- 2009/10–2018/19: Auckland
- 2012: Nottinghamshire
- 2019/20–2020/21: Brisbane Heat
- 2019/20–2022/23: Wellington
- 2022: Welsh Fire
- 2022/23: Perth Scorchers
- 2023: Central Sparks
- 2023/24–present: Auckland
- 2026/27: Hobart Hurricanes

Career statistics
Competition	WODI	WT20I
Matches	97	131
Runs scored	2345	1521
Batting average	32.56	19.75
100s/50s	3/11	0/3
Top score	141*	62
Balls bowled	148	66
Wickets	2	2
Bowling average	72.00	33.00
5 wickets in innings	0	0
10 wickets in match	0	0
Best bowling	1/5	1/5
Catches/stumpings	43/–	47/2
Medal record
Women's cricket
Representing New Zealand
ICC T20 World Cup
Winner	2024 UAE
Commonwealth Games
Bronze medal – third place	2022 Birmingham
- Source: Cricinfo, 29 October 2026

Madeline Lee Green (born 20 October 1992) is a New Zealand cricketer who currently plays for Auckland and New Zealand.

== Career ==
In April 2018, she won the Ruth Martin Cup for her domestic batting at the New Zealand Cricket Awards. On 8 June 2018, she scored her first century in WODIs, with 121 runs against Ireland.

In August 2018, she was awarded a central contract by New Zealand Cricket, following the tours of Ireland and England in the previous months. In October 2018, she was named in New Zealand's squad for the 2018 ICC Women's World Twenty20 tournament in the West Indies. In January 2020, she was named in New Zealand's squad for the 2020 ICC Women's T20 World Cup in Australia. In February 2022, she was named in New Zealand's team for the 2022 Women's Cricket World Cup in New Zealand. In June 2022, Green was named in New Zealand's team for the cricket tournament at the 2022 Commonwealth Games in Birmingham, England.

In September 2024 she was named in the New Zealand squad for the 2024 ICC Women's T20 World Cup.

Green was named in the New Zealand squad for their ODI tour to India in October 2024.

In May 2025, Green signed a short-term contract to play for English club The Blaze.

== Personal life ==
In April 2019, Green married New Zealand cricketer Liz Perry.
