= South Africa women's cricket team in India in 2024 =

International cricket tour

	India	South Africa
- Dates: 16 June – 9 July 2024
Captains	Harmanpreet Kaur	Laura Wolvaardt

Test series
- Result: India won the 1-match series 1–0
Most runs	Shafali Verma (229)	Suné Luus (174)
Most wickets	Sneh Rana (10)	Delmi Tucker (2)

One Day International series
- Results: India won the 3-match series 3–0
Most runs	Smriti Mandhana (343)	Laura Wolvaardt (200)
Most wickets	Deepti Sharma (6)	Ayabonga Khaka (4); Nonkululeko Mlaba (4)
- Player of the series: Smriti Mandhana (Ind)

Twenty20 International series
- Results: 3-match series drawn 1–1
Most runs	Smriti Mandhana (100)	Tazmin Brits (153)
Most wickets	Pooja Vastrakar (8)	Nadine de Klerk (1); Ayabonga Khaka (1); Nonkululeko Mlaba (1); Chloe Tryon (1)
- Player of the series: Pooja Vastrakar (Ind)

The South Africa women's cricket team toured India in June and July 2024 to play the India women's cricket team. The tour consisted of one Test, three One Day International (ODI) and three Twenty20 International (T20I) matches. The ODI series formed part of the 2022–2025 ICC Women's Championship. The T20I series formed part of both teams' preparation ahead of the 2024 ICC Women's T20 World Cup tournament, and served as part of India's preparation for the 2024 Women's Twenty20 Asia Cup. In May 2024, BCCI confirmed the fixtures for the tour.

== Background ==
Originally, this series, and the series against New Zealand, was scheduled to be played between July and September in 2023 with three ODIs and three T20Is each. However, it was postponed due to the 2023 ICC Cricket World Cup in India. The Test match wasn’t originally part of the Future Tours Programme (FTP), but the Board of Control for Cricket in India (BCCI) and the Cricket South Africa (CSA) decided to add it to promote women's Test cricket.

== Squads ==
India			South Africa		
Test	ODIs	T20Is	Test	ODIs	T20Is
Harmanpreet Kaur (c); Smriti Mandhana (vc); Uma Chetry (wk); Richa Ghosh (wk); Rajeshwari Gayakwad; Saika Ishaque; Priya Punia; Sneh Rana; Arundhati Reddy; Jemimah Rodrigues; Shubha Satheesh; Shabnam Shakil; Deepti Sharma; Meghna Singh; Renuka Singh; Pooja Vastrakar; Shafali Verma	Harmanpreet Kaur (c); Smriti Mandhana (vc); Uma Chetry (wk); Richa Ghosh (wk); Dayalan Hemalatha; Saika Ishaque; Shreyanka Patil; Priya Punia; Arundhati Reddy; Jemimah Rodrigues; Shabnam Shakil; Deepti Sharma; Renuka Singh; Asha Sobhana; Pooja Vastrakar; Shafali Verma; Radha Yadav	Harmanpreet Kaur (c); Smriti Mandhana (vc); Uma Chetry (wk); Richa Ghosh (wk); Dayalan Hemalatha; Amanjot Kaur; Shreyanka Patil; Arundhati Reddy; Jemimah Rodrigues; Sajeevan Sajana; Shabnam Shakil; Deepti Sharma; Renuka Singh; Asha Sobhana; Pooja Vastrakar; Shafali Verma; Radha Yadav	Laura Wolvaardt (c); Anneke Bosch; Tazmin Brits; Nadine de Klerk; Annerie Dercksen; Mieke de Ridder (wk); Sinalo Jafta (wk); Marizanne Kapp; Masabata Klaas; Suné Luus; Eliz-Mari Marx; Nonkululeko Mlaba; Tumi Sekhukhune; Nondumiso Shangase; Delmi Tucker	Laura Wolvaardt (c); Anneke Bosch; Tazmin Brits; Nadine de Klerk; Annerie Dercksen; Mieke de Ridder (wk); Sinalo Jafta (wk); Marizanne Kapp; Ayabonga Khaka; Masabata Klaas; Suné Luus; Eliz-Mari Marx; Nonkululeko Mlaba; Tumi Sekhukhune; Nondumiso Shangase; Delmi Tucker	Laura Wolvaardt (c); Anneke Bosch; Tazmin Brits; Nadine de Klerk; Annerie Dercksen; Mieke de Ridder (wk); Sinalo Jafta (wk); Marizanne Kapp; Ayabonga Khaka; Masabata Klaas; Suné Luus; Eliz-Mari Marx; Nonkululeko Mlaba; Tumi Sekhukhune; Chloe Tryon

Saika Ishaque was named as reserves for the T20I series. On 20 June 2024, Shabnam Shakil was added to the India’s squad for all three formats.

== Tour match ==
=== 50-over match: Board President's XI v South Africa ===
13 June 2024
13:30 (D/N)
Scorecard

Board President's XI (India); 71/1 (14 overs)	v	South Africa
Priya Punia 25 (31); Tumi Sekhukhune 1/16 (3 overs)

No result
M. Chinnaswamy Stadium, Bangalore
Umpires: K. N. Ananthapadmanabhan (Ind) and Narayanan Janani (Ind)

- Board President XI won the toss and elected to bat.
- No further play was possible due to rain.

== ODI series ==
=== 1st ODI ===
16 June 2024
13:30 (D/N)
Scorecard

India; 265/8 (50 overs)	v	South Africa; 122 (37.4 overs)
Smriti Mandhana 117 (127); Ayabonga Khaka 3/47 (10 overs)		Suné Luus 33 (58); Asha Sobhana 4/21 (8.4 overs)

India won by 143 runs
M. Chinnaswamy Stadium, Bangalore
Umpires: Rohan Pandit (Ind) and Nimali Perera (SL)
Player of the match: Smriti Mandhana (Ind)

- India won the toss and elected to bat.
- Asha Sobhana (Ind) and Annerie Dercksen (SA) both made their ODI debut.
- Deepti Sharma played in her 200th international match and became the first Indian player to complete 2,000 runs and 100 wickets in women's ODIs.
- Smriti Mandhana became the second Indian women's cricketer to score 7,000th run in international cricket.
- Women's Championship points: India 2, South Africa 0.

=== 2nd ODI ===
19 June 2024
13:30 (D/N)
Scorecard

India; 325/3 (50 overs)	v	South Africa; 321/6 (50 overs)
Smriti Mandhana 136 (120); Nonkululeko Mlaba 2/51 (10 overs)		Laura Wolvaardt 135* (135); Pooja Vastrakar 2/54 (7 overs)

India won by 4 runs
M. Chinnaswamy Stadium, Bangalore
Umpires: K. N. Ananthapadmanabhan (Ind) and Narayanan Janani (Ind)
Player of the match: Harmanpreet Kaur (Ind)

- South Africa won the toss and elected to field.
- Arundhati Reddy (Ind) and Mieke de Ridder (SA) both made their ODI debut.
- Laura Wolvaardt became the youngest and first South African player to score 4,000th run in women's ODIs.
- Marizanne Kapp (SA) scored her 3,000th run in women's ODIs.
- Women's Championship points: India 2, South Africa 0.

=== 3rd ODI ===
23 June 2024
13:30 (D/N)
Scorecard

South Africa; 215/8 (50 overs)	v	India; 220/4 (40.4 overs)
Laura Wolvaardt 61 (57); Deepti Sharma 2/27 (10 overs)		Smriti Mandhana 90 (83); Ayabonga Khaka 1/38 (9 overs)

India won by 6 wickets
M. Chinnaswamy Stadium, Bangalore
Umpires: Narayanan Janani (Ind) and Nimali Perera (SL)
Player of the match: Deepti Sharma (Ind)

- South Africa won the toss and elected to bat.
- Pooja Vastrakar (Ind) played in her 100th international match.
- Harmanpreet Kaur became the third Indian and seventh women's cricketer in overall to score 7,000 runs in international cricket.
- Women's Championship points: India 2, South Africa 0.

== Only Test ==
28 June – 1 July 2024
Scorecard

India	v	South Africa
603/6d (115.1 overs); Shafali Verma 205 (197); Delmi Tucker 2/141 (26 overs)		266 (84.3 overs); Marizanne Kapp 74 (141); Sneh Rana 8/77 (25.3 overs)
37/0 (9.2 overs); Shafali Verma 24* (28)		373 (154.4 overs) (f/o); Laura Wolvaardt 122 (314); Rajeshwari Gayakwad 2/55 (30.4 overs)

India won by 10 wickets
M. A. Chidambaram Stadium, Chennai
Umpires: Virender Sharma (Ind) and Gayathri Venugopalan (Ind)
Player of the match: Sneh Rana (Ind)

- India won the toss and elected to bat.
- Annerie Dercksen (SA) made her Test debut.
- Smriti Mandhana (Ind) became the second fastest Indian cricketer to score 500th run in women's Tests.
- Shafali Verma (Ind) scored her maiden and also the fastest century of 113 balls, and scored maiden and also the fastest double-hundred off 194 balls in women's Tests. She became the youngest Indian cricketer to score 500 Test runs.
- India's opening partnership between Shafali Verma and Smriti Mandhana (292 run) was highest opening partnership, surpassing the previous world record of 241 set by Pakistan's Kiran Baluch and Sajjida Shah, and this was also second highest partnership for any wicket in women's Test cricket.
- India recorded highest team total in women's Tests.
- Sneh Rana (Ind) took her first five-wicket haul and first ten-wicket haul in Tests. She became the first Indian female spinner to achieve this feat.
- Suné Luus and Laura Wolvaardt (SA) both scored their first centuries in Tests.

== T20I series ==
=== 1st T20I ===
5 July 2024
19:00 (N)
Scorecard

South Africa; 189/4 (20 overs)	v	India; 177/4 (20 overs)
Tazmin Brits 81 (56); Pooja Vastrakar 2/23 (4 overs)		Jemimah Rodrigues 53* (30); Nadine de Klerk 1/30 (4 overs)

South Africa won by 12 runs
M. A. Chidambaram Stadium, Chennai
Umpires: Jayaraman Madanagopal (Ind) and Vrinda Rathi (Ind)
Player of the match: Tazmin Brits (SA)

- India won the toss and elected to field.
- Tazmin Brits (SA) scored her 2,000th run in international cricket.
- Sajeevan Sajana replaced Richa Ghosh as a concussion substitute for India during second innings.
- Ayabonga Khaka (SA) took her 50th wicket in women's T20Is.

=== 2nd T20I ===
7 July 2024
19:00 (N)
Scorecard

South Africa; 177/6 (20 overs)	v	India
Tazmin Brits 52 (39); Deepti Sharma 2/20 (4 overs)

No result
M. A. Chidambaram Stadium, Chennai
Umpires: Virender Sharma (Ind) and Gayathri Venugopalan (Ind)

- India won the toss and elected to field.
- Rain prevented any further play.
- Uma Chetry (Ind) made her T20I debut.

=== 3rd T20I ===
9 July 2024
19:00 (N)
Scorecard

South Africa; 84 (17.1 overs)	v	India; 88/0 (10.5 overs)
Tazmin Brits 20 (23); Pooja Vastrakar 4/13 (3.1 overs)		Smriti Mandhana 54* (40)

India won by 10 wickets
M. A. Chidambaram Stadium, Chennai
Umpires: Vrinda Rathi (Ind) and Virender Sharma (Ind)
Player of the match: Pooja Vastrakar (Ind)

- India won the toss and elected to field.
- Laura Wolvaardt (SA) became the second youngest cricketer to score 6,000th run in international cricket.
- Pooja Vastrakar (Ind) took her 50th wicket in women's T20Is.
- This was India's 100th victory in women's T20Is.
