= List of Loughborough Lightning cricketers =

This is an alphabetical list of cricketers who played for Loughborough Lightning during their existence between 2016 and 2019. They competed in the Women's Cricket Super League, a Twenty20 competition, during these years before being replaced by Lightning as part of a restructure of English women's domestic cricket.

Players' names are followed by the years in which they were active as a Loughborough Lightning player. Seasons given are first and last seasons; the player did not necessarily play in all the intervening seasons. This list only includes players who appeared in at least one match for Loughborough Lightning; players who were named in the team's squad for a season but did not play a match are not included.

== A ==
- Georgia Adams (2018–2019)
- Chamari Atapattu (2019)

== B ==
- Kristen Beams (2017)
- Thea Brookes (2016–2017)
- Kathryn Bryce (2019)

== D ==
- Sophie Devine (2016–2018)
- Mignon du Preez (2019)

== E ==
- Georgia Elwiss (2016–2019)

== F ==
- Abigail Freeborn (2017–2019)

== G ==
- Jo Gardner (2018–2019)
- Sarah Glenn (2017–2019)
- Kirstie Gordon (2018–2019)
- Rebecca Grundy (2016–2017)
- Jenny Gunn (2018–2019)

== H ==
- Rachael Haynes (2018)
- Lucy Higham (2017–2019)

== J ==
- Amy Jones (2016–2019)
- Evelyn Jones (2016)

== K ==
- Marie Kelly (2017)

== L ==
- Beth Langston (2016–2017)

== M ==
- Hayley Matthews (2019)

== N ==
- Tara Norris (2019)

== O ==
- Sonia Odedra (2016–2017)

== P ==
- Ellyse Perry (2016–2017)

== S ==
- Paige Scholfield (2016–2017)
- Linsey Smith (2018)

== V ==
- Dane van Niekerk (2016)
- Elyse Villani (2017–2018)

== Captains ==
No.	Name	Nationality	Years	First	Last	Total Matches
1	Georgia Elwiss	England	2016–2019	30 July 2016	1 September 2019	31
2	Sophie Devine	New Zealand	2018	25 July 2018	25 July 2018	1
3	Jenny Gunn	England	2019	15 August 2019	15 August 2019	1

== See also ==
- List of Lightning (women's cricket) cricketers
