= England women's cricket team in India in 2023–24 =

International cricket tour

	India	England
- Dates: 6 – 17 December 2023
Captains	Harmanpreet Kaur	Heather Knight

Test series
- Result: India won the 1-match series 1–0
Most runs	Jemimah Rodrigues (95)	Nat Sciver-Brunt (59)
Most wickets	Deepti Sharma (9)	Charlie Dean (5); Sophie Ecclestone (5)

Twenty20 International series
- Results: England won the 3-match series 2–1
Most runs	Jemimah Rodrigues (63)	Nat Sciver-Brunt (93)
Most wickets	Renuka Singh (7)	Sophie Ecclestone (7)
- Player of the series: Nat Sciver-Brunt (Eng)

The England women's cricket team toured India in December 2023 to play three Women's Twenty20 International (T20I) matches and one Women's Test (Test) match. The series was the first to have the Decision Review System (DRS) for a women's bilateral series in India.

Ahead of the T20I series, respective 'A' teams played three 20-over matches. England A won the 20-over series 2–1.

England won the T20I series 2–1.

The Test match was the 100th Test match to be played by England, becoming the first team to play 100 Test matches in women's international cricket. India won the only Test by 347 runs, a record victory margin in terms of runs in women's Test matches. It was India's first women's Test match win at home against England.

== Squads ==
India		England	
Test	T20Is	Test	T20Is
Harmanpreet Kaur (c); Smriti Mandhana (vc); Yastika Bhatia (wk); Harleen Deol; Richa Ghosh (wk); Rajeshwari Gayakwad; Saika Ishaque; Jemimah Rodrigues; Deepti Sharma; Meghna Singh; Titas Sadhu; Shubha Satheesh; Renuka Singh; Sneh Rana; Pooja Vastrakar; Shafali Verma	Harmanpreet Kaur (c); Smriti Mandhana (vc); Yastika Bhatia (wk); Kanika Ahuja; Richa Ghosh (wk); Saika Ishaque; Amanjot Kaur; Mannat Kashyap; Shreyanka Patil; Minnu Mani; Jemimah Rodrigues; Deepti Sharma; Titas Sadhu; Renuka Singh; Pooja Vastrakar; Shafali Verma	Heather Knight (c); Tammy Beaumont; Lauren Bell; Maia Bouchier; Alice Capsey; Kate Cross; Charlie Dean; Sophia Dunkley; Sophie Ecclestone; Lauren Filer; Kirstie Gordon; Bess Heath (wk); Amy Jones (wk); ~~Emma Lamb~~; Nat Sciver-Brunt; Danni Wyatt	Heather Knight (c); Lauren Bell; Maia Bouchier; Alice Capsey; Charlie Dean; Sophia Dunkley; Mahika Gaur; Danielle Gibson; Sarah Glenn; Bess Heath (wk); Amy Jones (wk); Freya Kemp; Nat Sciver-Brunt; Danni Wyatt

On 8 December 2023, Emma Lamb withdrew from England's Test squad due to a back injury, while Maia Bouchier and Kirstie Gordon were added to England's Test squad.

== A team 20-over series ==
=== 1st match ===
29 November 2023
13:30
Scorecard

India A 134/7 (20 overs)	v	England A 131/8 (20 overs)
Disha Kasat 25 (32); Charlie Dean 2/19 (4 overs)		Hollie Armitage 52 (41); Kashvee Gautam 2/23 (4 overs)

India A won by 3 runs
Wankhede Stadium, Mumbai
Umpires: Narayanan Janani (Ind) and Gayathri Venugopalan (Ind)
Player of the match: Shreyanka Patil (Ind A)

- India A won the toss and elected to bat.

=== 2nd match ===
1 December 2023
13:30
Scorecard

India A 149/9 (20 overs)	v	England A 151/6 (18.5 overs)
Kanika Ahuja 27 (14); Kirstie Gordon 3/28 (4 overs)		Grace Scrivens 39 (34); Minnu Mani 2/29 (3 overs)

England A won by 4 wickets
Wankhede Stadium, Mumbai
Umpires: Vrinda Rathi (Ind) and Gayathri Venugopalan (Ind)
Player of the match: Issy Wong (Eng A)

- India A won the toss and elected to bat.

=== 3rd match ===
3 December 2023
13:30
Scorecard

India A 101 (19.2 overs)	v	England A 104/8 (19.1 overs)
Uma Chetry 21 (16); Lauren Filer 2/15 (3 overs)		Issy Wong 28* (30); Shreyanka Patil 2/13 (4 overs)

England A won by 2 wickets
Wankhede Stadium, Mumbai
Umpires: Narayanan Janani (Ind) and Vrinda Rathi (Ind)
Player of the match: Issy Wong (Eng A)

- India A won the toss and elected to bat.

== T20I series ==
=== 1st T20I ===
6 December 2023
19:00 (N)
Scorecard

England; 197/6 (20 overs)	v	India; 159/6 (20 overs)
Nat Sciver-Brunt 77 (53); Renuka Singh 3/27 (4 overs)		Shafali Verma 52 (42); Sophie Ecclestone 3/15 (4 overs)

England won by 38 runs
Wankhede Stadium, Mumbai
Umpires: Saiyed Khalid (Ind) and Vrinda Rathi (Ind)
Player of the match: Nat Sciver-Brunt (Eng)

- India won the toss and elected to field.
- Saika Ishaque and Shreyanka Patil (Ind) both made their T20I debuts.

=== 2nd T20I ===
9 December 2023
19:00 (N)
Scorecard

India; 80 (16.2 overs)	v	England; 82/6 (11.2 overs)
Jemimah Rodrigues 30 (33); Sophie Ecclestone 2/13 (2.3 overs)		Alice Capsey 25 (21); Deepti Sharma 2/4 (2 overs)

England won by 4 wickets
Wankhede Stadium, Mumbai
Umpires: Narayanan Janani (Ind) and Rohan Pandit (Ind)
Player of the match: Charlie Dean (Eng)

- England won the toss and elected to field.

=== 3rd T20I ===
10 December 2023
19:00 (N)
Scorecard

England; 126 (20 overs)	v	India; 130/5 (19 overs)
Heather Knight 52 (42); Shreyanka Patil 3/19 (4 overs)		Smriti Mandhana 48 (48); Freya Kemp 2/24 (4 overs)

India won by 5 wickets
Wankhede Stadium, Mumbai
Umpires: Saiyed Khalid (Ind) and Vrinda Rathi (Ind)
Player of the match: Shreyanka Patil (Ind)

- England won the toss and elected to bat.
- Bess Heath (Eng) made her T20I debut.

== Only Test ==
14–16 December 2023
Scorecard

India	v	England
428 (104.3 overs); Shubha Satheesh 69 (76); Lauren Bell 3/67 (19 overs)		136 (35.3 overs); Nat Sciver-Brunt 59 (70); Deepti Sharma 5/7 (5.3 overs)
186/6d (42 overs); Harmanpreet Kaur 44* (67); Charlie Dean 4/68 (19 overs)		131 (27.3 overs); Heather Knight 21 (20); Deepti Sharma 4/32 (8 overs)

India won by 347 runs
DY Patil Stadium, Navi Mumbai
Umpires: K. N. Ananthapadmanabhan (Ind) and Vrinda Rathi (Ind)
Player of the match: Deepti Sharma (Ind)

- India won the toss and elected to bat.
- Jemimah Rodrigues, Shubha Satheesh and Renuka Singh (Ind) all made their Test debuts.
- This was the first Women's Test match to be played at this venue.
- Deepti Sharma (Ind) took her first five-wicket haul in Tests.
- India recorded the highest margin of victory by runs in Tests.
