= List of The Blaze women's cricketers =

This is an alphabetical list of cricketers who have played for The Blaze since their founding in 2020. They first played in the Rachael Heyhoe Flint Trophy, a 50 over competition that began in 2020, in which the team was known as Lightning. In 2021, the Twenty20 Charlotte Edwards Cup was added to the women's domestic structure in England. Ahead of the 2023 season, the team changed its name to The Blaze.

Players' names are followed by the years in which they were active as a The Blaze player. Seasons given are first and last seasons; the player did not necessarily play in all the intervening seasons. Current players are shown as active to the latest season in which they played for the club. This list only includes players who appeared in at least one match for The Blaze; players who were named in the team's squad for a season but did not play a match are not included.

As of 6 September 2024

== B ==
- Grace Ballinger (2020–2024)
- Tammy Beaumont (2020–2024)
- Georgie Boyce (2022–2023)
- Kathryn Bryce (2020–2024)
- Sarah Bryce (2020–2024)

== C ==
- Ella Claridge (2021–2024)
- Piepa Cleary (2022)

== D ==
- Gwenan Davies (2022)
- Nadine de Klerk (2023–2024)

== E ==
- Bethan Ellis (2020–2022)

== F ==
- Ria Fackrell (2020)
- Abigail Freeborn (2020–2021)

== G ==
- Bethan Gammon (2024)
- Sarah Glenn (2023–2024)
- Kirstie Gordon (2020–2024)
- Heather Graham (2024)
- Teresa Graves (2020–2024)
- Yvonne Graves (2021)
- Josie Groves (2021–2024)

== H ==
- Nancy Harman (2020–2021)
- Bethany Harmer (2021–2024)
- Lucy Higham (2020–2024)

== K ==
- Leah Kellogg (2020)
- Marie Kelly (2022–2024)
- Michaela Kirk (2021–2024)

== L ==
- Lizelle Lee (2023)

== M ==
- Cassidy McCarthy (2023–2024)
- Daisy Mullan (2024)
- Sophie Munro (2020–2024)

== O ==
- Sonia Odedra (2021)

== P ==
- Shachi Pai (2020–2021)
- Orla Prendergast (2024)
- Alicia Presland (2020–2022)

== S ==
- Nat Sciver-Brunt (2023)
- Ilenia Sims (2020)

== W ==
- Emily Windsor (2022)

== Captains ==
| No. | Name | Nationality | Years | First | Last | LA | T20 | Total |
|---|---|---|---|---|---|---|---|---|
| 1 | Kathryn Bryce | Scotland | 2020–2022 | 29 August 2020 | 11 September 2022 | 18 | 9 | 27 |
| 2 | Kirstie Gordon | England | 2021–2024 | 25 August 2021 | 6 September 2024 | 27 | 22 | 49 |
| 3 | Marie Kelly | England | 2023–2024 | 7 June 2023 | 14 July 2024 | 2 | 1 | 3 |

== See also ==
- List of Loughborough Lightning cricketers
