= England women's cricket team in New Zealand in 2020–21 =

International cricket tour

	New Zealand women	England women
- Dates: 23 February – 7 March 2021
Captains	Sophie Devine	Heather Knight (Note: Nat Sciver captained England in the third WT20I.)

One Day International series
- Results: England women won the 3-match series 2–1
Most runs	Amy Satterthwaite (135)	Tammy Beaumont (231)
Most wickets	Amelia Kerr (4)	Nat Sciver (5)

Twenty20 International series
- Results: England women won the 3-match series 3–0
Most runs	Amy Satterthwaite (76)	Tammy Beaumont (102)
Most wickets	Leigh Kasperek (4)	Four bowlers took five wickets each (Note: Freya Davies, Sophie Ecclestone, Sarah Glenn and Nat Sciver all took five wickets each.)
- Player of the series: Tammy Beaumont (Eng)

The England women's cricket team played against the New Zealand women's cricket team in February and March 2021. The six-match series was played during the time that was originally scheduled to be used to host the 2021 Women's Cricket World Cup, after that tournament was postponed by one year due to the COVID-19 pandemic. The fixtures for the tour were confirmed in January 2021, with three Women's Twenty20 International (WT20I) and three Women's One Day International (WODI) were played. The WT20I matches took place on the same day as the New Zealand men's fixtures at the same venues.

On 27 February 2021, the second WT20I match was moved from Eden Park in Auckland to the Wellington Regional Stadium after Auckland went into lockdown due to the COVID-19 pandemic. The remaining matches were scheduled to be played behind closed doors. However, crowds were allowed to attend the last WT20I after restrictions were relaxed.

On 1 March 2021, the final WT20I was also moved from the Bay Oval in Tauranga to the Wellington Regional Stadium, after logistical complications arose from the movement of the men's T20I matches.

England won the first two WODI matches to take an unassailable lead in the series. New Zealand won the third WODI by seven wickets, ending a losing streak of eleven matches, with England winning the series 2–1. England also won the first two WT20I matches, winning the series with a game to spare. Nat Sciver captained England for the first time in international cricket for the third WT20I match, after Heather Knight was ruled out of the fixture due to an injury. England went on to win the match by 32 runs to take the series 3–0.

== Squads ==
WODIs		WT20Is	
New Zealand	England	New Zealand	England
Sophie Devine (c); Amy Satterthwaite (vc); Natalie Dodd; Maddy Green; Brooke Halliday; Hayley Jensen; Fran Jonas; Amelia Kerr; Jess Kerr; Frances Mackay; Katey Martin (wk); Hannah Rowe; Gabby Sullivan; Lea Tahuhu	Heather Knight (c); Nat Sciver (vc); Tammy Beaumont; Katherine Brunt; Kate Cross; Freya Davies; Sophia Dunkley; Sophie Ecclestone; Georgia Elwiss; Tash Farrant; Sarah Glenn; Amy Jones (wk); Mady Villiers; Fran Wilson; Lauren Winfield-Hill; Danni Wyatt	Sophie Devine (c); Amy Satterthwaite (vc); Kate Ebrahim; Maddy Green; Brooke Halliday; Hayley Jensen; Leigh Kasperek; Amelia Kerr; Jess Kerr; Rosemary Mair; Katey Martin (wk); Thamsyn Newton; Hannah Rowe; Gabby Sullivan; ~~Lea Tahuhu~~	Heather Knight (c); Nat Sciver (vc); Tammy Beaumont; Katherine Brunt; Kate Cross; Freya Davies; Sophia Dunkley; Sophie Ecclestone; Georgia Elwiss; Tash Farrant; Sarah Glenn; Amy Jones (wk); Mady Villiers; Fran Wilson; Lauren Winfield-Hill; Danni Wyatt

Issy Wong also travelled with the England squad, but was not part of the playing squad. New Zealand's Lea Tahuhu was ruled out for the last two WODIs due to a hamstring injury, with Gabby Sullivan named as replacement. Lea Tahuhu was also ruled out of the WT20I matches, with Brooke Halliday named as her replacement. Gabby Sullivan was added to New Zealand's WT20I squad as injury cover for Hannah Rowe. Nat Sciver captained England for the third WT20I after Heather Knight was ruled out with a hamstring injury.

== Tour matches ==
14 February 2021
11:00
Scorecard

England; 299/9 (50 overs)	v	New Zealand XI Women; 279/6 (50 overs)
Nat Sciver 75 (74); Hayley Jensen 2/25 (6 overs)		Lauren Down 97 (108); Tash Farrant 1/17 (4 overs)

England Women won by 20 runs
John Davies Oval, Queenstown
Umpires: Ashley Mehrotra (NZ) and PJ Pasco (NZ)

- Toss uncontested, England Women elected to bat.

16 February 2021
11:00
Scorecard

New Zealand XI Women; 316/5 (50 overs)	v	England; 286 (49.3 overs)
Natalie Dodd 91 (104); Sophie Ecclestone 2/38 (8 overs)		Danni Wyatt 54 (42); Claudia Green 5/56 (10 overs)

New Zealand XI Women won by 30 runs
John Davies Oval, Queenstown
Umpires: Ashley Mehrotra (NZ) and PJ Pasco (NZ)

- Toss uncontested, New Zealand XI Women elected to bat.

== WODI series ==
=== 1st WODI ===
23 February 2021
14:00 (D/N)
Scorecard

New Zealand; 178 (45.1 overs)	v	England; 181/2 (33.4 overs)
Hayley Jensen 53 (58); Tash Farrant 2/31 (7 overs)		Tammy Beaumont 71 (86); Hayley Jensen 1/18 (5 overs)

England Women won by 8 wickets
Hagley Oval, Christchurch
Umpires: Billy Bowden (NZ) and Kim Cotton (NZ)
Player of the match: Tammy Beaumont (Eng)

- New Zealand Women won the toss and elected to bat.
- Brooke Halliday and Fran Jonas (NZ) both made their WODI debuts.
- Sophie Ecclestone (Eng) took her 100th international wicket.

=== 2nd WODI ===
26 February 2021
11:00
Scorecard

New Zealand; 192 (49.5 overs)	v	England; 194/3 (37.4 overs)
Brooke Halliday 60 (80); Nat Sciver 3/26 (9 overs)		Tammy Beaumont 72* (112); Brooke Halliday 1/18 (4 overs)

England Women won by 7 wickets
University Oval, Dunedin
Umpires: Billy Bowden (NZ) and Kim Cotton (NZ)
Player of the match: Nat Sciver (Eng)

- New Zealand Women won the toss and elected to bat.

=== 3rd WODI ===
28 February 2021
11:00
Scorecard

England; 220 (47.5 overs)	v	New Zealand; 223/3 (46.4 overs)
Tammy Beaumont 88* (113); Amelia Kerr 4/42 (8.5 overs)		Amy Satterthwaite 119* (128); Freya Davies 1/33 (8 overs)

New Zealand Women won by 7 wickets
University Oval, Dunedin
Umpires: Billy Bowden (NZ) and Ashley Mehrotra (NZ)
Player of the match: Amelia Kerr (NZ)

- England Women won the toss and elected to bat.
- Tammy Beaumont (Eng) became the first player to carry the bat for England in WODIs.
- Amy Satterthwaite (NZ) scored her 4,000th runs WODIs.

== WT20I series ==
=== 1st WT20I ===
3 March 2021
15:00
Scorecard

New Zealand; 96 (19.4 overs)	v	England; 99/3 (16 overs)
Katey Martin 36 (32); Sarah Glenn 2/11 (4 overs)		Danni Wyatt 33 (26); Leigh Kasperek 2/24 (4 overs)

England Women won by 7 wickets
Wellington Regional Stadium, Wellington
Umpires: Kim Cotton (NZ) and John Dempsey (NZ)
Player of the match: Sarah Glenn (Eng)

- England Women won the toss and elected to field.
- Brooke Halliday (NZ) made her WT20I debut.
- Katey Martin, at the age of 36 years and 24 days, became the oldest player to represent New Zealand in WT20Is.

=== 2nd WT20I ===
5 March 2021
15:00
Scorecard

New Zealand; 123/9 (20 overs)	v	England; 124/4 (17.2 overs)
Amy Satterthwaite 49 (30); Freya Davies 4/23 (4 overs)		Tammy Beaumont 63 (53); Rosemary Mair 2/22 (3 overs)

England Women won by 6 wickets
Wellington Regional Stadium, Wellington
Umpires: John Dempsey (NZ) and Ashley Mehrotra (NZ)
Player of the match: Freya Davies (Eng)

- England Women won the toss and elected to field.

=== 3rd WT20I ===
7 March 2021
16:00 (D/N)
Scorecard

England; 128/9 (20 overs)	v	New Zealand; 96 (18 overs)
Sophia Dunkley 26 (29); Sophie Devine 3/30 (4 overs)		Amy Satterthwaite 25 (26); Mady Villiers 3/10 (2 overs)

England Women won by 32 runs
Wellington Regional Stadium, Wellington
Umpires: Kim Cotton (NZ) and John Dempsey (NZ)
Player of the match: Katherine Brunt (Eng)

- New Zealand Women won the toss and elected to field.
