= 2024–25 Super Smash =

2024–25 Super Smash may refer to:

- 2024–25 Super Smash (men's cricket)
- 2024–25 Super Smash (women's cricket)
