= List of women's Test cricket records =

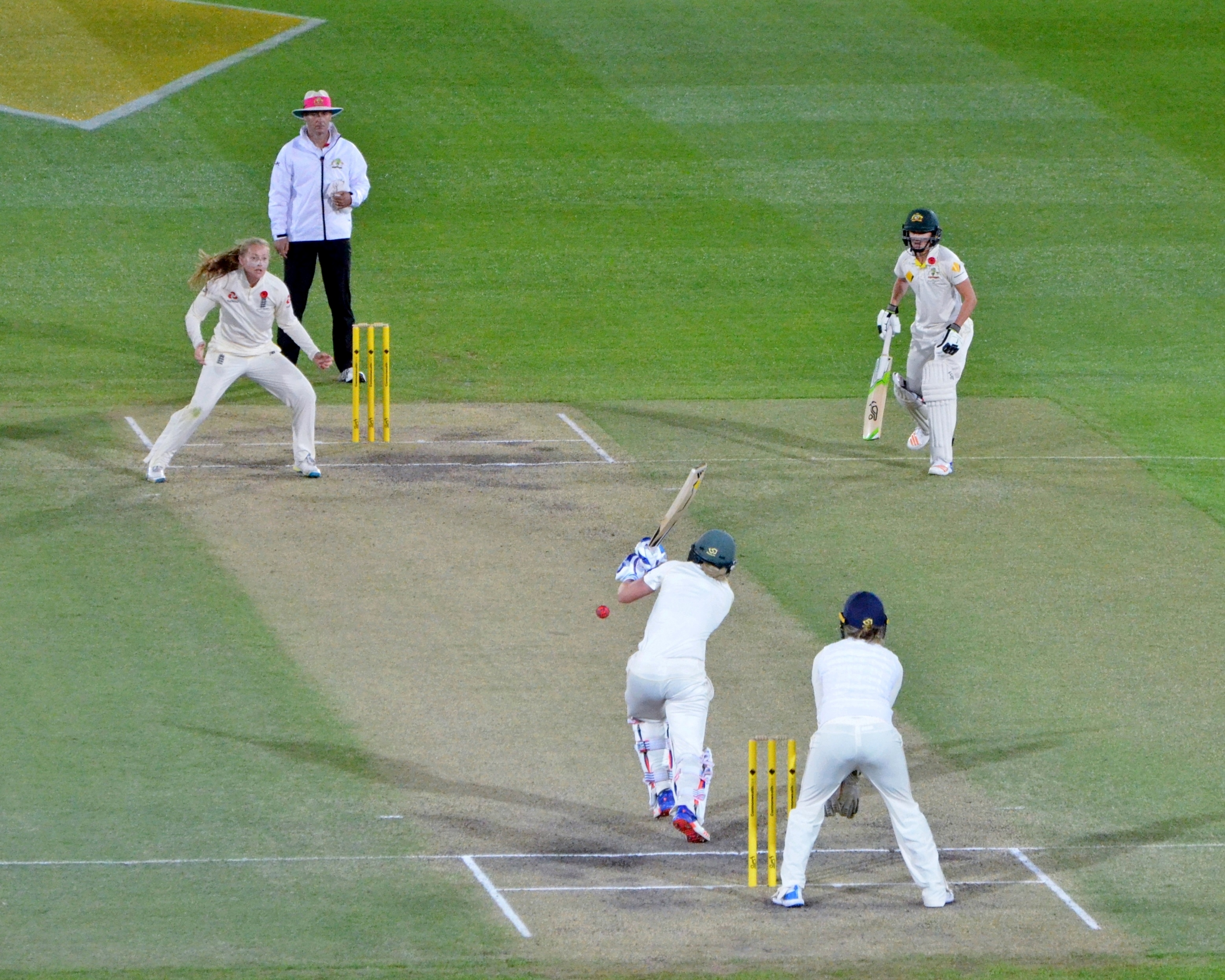
Ellyse Perry brings up the 200 mark of her 213* during the 2017–18 Women's Ashes Test, the highest individual test score by an Australian woman

This is a list of women's Test cricket records; that is, record team and individual performances in women's Test cricket. Records for the short form of women's international cricket, One Day Internationals, are at List of women's One Day International cricket records.

Cricket is, by its nature, capable of generating large numbers of records and statistics. Women's Test cricket has been played since 1934–35 with essentially the same rules as are played today, and therefore many comparisons can be made of teams and individuals through these records.

== Listing criteria ==
In general the top five are listed in each category (except when there is a tie for the last place among the five, when all the tied record holders are noted).

== Listing notation ==
Team notation

- (300–3) indicates that a team scored 300 runs for three wickets and the innings was closed, either due to a successful run chase or if no playing time remained.
- (300–3 d) indicates that a team scored 300 runs for three wickets, and declared its innings closed.
- (300) indicates that a team scored 300 runs and was all out.

Batting notation

- (100) indicates that a batsman scored 100 runs and was out.
- (100*) indicates that a batsman scored 100 runs and was not out.

Bowling notation

- (5–100) indicates that a bowler has captured 5 wickets while conceding 100 runs.

Currently playing

- Current Test cricketers are shown in **bold**.

== Team records ==
=== Team wins, losses and draws ===
==== Matches played ====
Team	1st Test	Matches	Won	Lost	Drawn	Tied	% Won
Australia	December 1934	81	24	11	46	0	29.62
England	December 1934	103	21	18	64	0	20.38
New Zealand	February 1935	45	2	10	33	0	4.44
South Africa	December 1960	16	1	8	7	0	6.25
West Indies	May 1976	12	1	3	8	0	8.33
India	October 1976	43	9	7	27	0	20.93
Pakistan	April 1998	3	0	2	1	0	0.00
Sri Lanka	April 1998	1	1	0	0	0	100.00
Ireland	July 2000	1	1	0	0	0	100.00
Netherlands	July 2007	1	0	1	0	0	0.00

Source: Cricinfo. Last updated: 13 July 2026.

==== Most consecutive Test wins ====
Win	Team	Period
3	Australia	1985 (Gosford) — 1987 (Worcester)
3	Australia	1991 (Adelaide) — 1992 (Sydney)
3	Australia	2001 (Shenley) — 2003 (Brisbane)
3	India	2006 (Taunton) — 2014 (Mysore)
3	India	2023 (Navi Mumbai) — 2024 (Chennai)
Source: Cricinfo. Last updated: 1 July 2024. *** indicates the sequence is in progress**.

==== Most consecutive Test losses ====
Loss	Team	Period
4	New Zealand	1934–35 (Christchurch) — 1954 (Leeds)
3	South Africa	2024 (Perth) — 2024 (Bloemfontein)*
2	Australia	1934–35 (Brisbane) — 1934–35 (Sydney)
2	New Zealand	1968–69 (Christchurch) — 1968–69 (Auckland)
2	England	1984–85 (Gosford) — 1984–85 (Bendigo)
2	India	1990–91 (Adelaide) — 1990–91 (Melbourne)
2	Pakistan	1997–98 (Colombo) — 2000 (Dublin)
2	England	2001 (Shenley) — 2001 (Leeds)
2	England	2014 (Wormsley) — 2015 (Canterbury)
2	England	2023 (Nottingham) — 2023 (Navi Mumbai)
Source: Cricinfo. Last updated: 24 January 2025. *** indicates the sequence is in progress**.

==== Most consecutive Test draws ====
Draw	Team	Period
11	India	1983–84 (Delhi) — 1990–91 (Sydney)
9	England	1954 (Worcester) — 1960–61 (Johannesburg)
9	New Zealand	1978–79 (Melbourne) — 1989–90 (Wellington)
9	New Zealand	1991–92 (New Plymouth) — 2004 (Scarborough)*
8	England	1995–96 (Hyderabad) — 1999 (Shenley)
Source: Cricinfo. Last updated: 23 October 2021. *** indicates the sequence is in progress**.

=== Result records ===
==== Greatest win margins (by innings) ====
Rank	Margin	Teams	Venue	Season
1	Innings and 337 runs	England (503–5 d) beat New Zealand (44 and 122)	Lancaster Park	1934–35
2	Innings and 284 runs	Australia (575–9 d) beat South Africa (76 and 215)	WACA Ground	2023–24
3	Innings and 140 runs	Australia (344) beat England (103 and 101)	Denis Compton Oval	2001
4	Innings and 122 runs	Australia (440) beat England (170 and 148)	Melbourne Cricket Ground	2024–25
5	Innings and 102 runs	Australia (338–6 d) beat New Zealand (149 and 87)	Basin Reserve	1947–48
Source: Cricinfo. Last updated: 3 February 2025.

==== Greatest win margins (by runs) ====
Rank	Margin	Teams	Venue	Season
1	347 runs	India (428 and 186–6 d) beat England (136 and 131)	DY Patil Stadium	2023–24
2	309 runs	Sri Lanka (305–9 d and 275–8 d) beat Pakistan (171 and 100)	Colts Cricket Club Ground	1997–98
3	286 runs	England (395–9 d and 236) beat South Africa (281 and 64)	Mangaung Oval	2024–25
4	270 runs	India (285 and 341–7 d) beat England (170 and 186)	Lord's	2026
5	188 runs	New Zealand (168 and 220–8 d) beat South Africa (111 and 89)	Sahara Stadium Kingsmead	1971–72
Source: Cricinfo. Last updated: 13 July 2026.

==== Narrowest win margins (by wickets) ====
Rank	Margin	Teams	Venue	Season
1	2 wickets	Australia (120 and 160–8) beat England (158 and 120)	New Road, Worcester	1951
2	4 wickets	England (144 and 173–6) beat New Zealand (212 and 104)	Cooks Gardens	1991–92
3	5 wickets	India (161–9 d and 55–5) beat West Indies (127 and 88)	Moin-ul-Haq Stadium	1976–77
3	5 wickets	Australia (78 and 139–5) beat England (124 and 92)	The Gabba	2002–03
3	5 wickets	India (307 and 98–5) beat England (99 and 305)	County Ground, Taunton	2006
Source: Cricinfo. Last updated: 23 October 2021.

==== Narrowest win margins (by runs) ====
Rank	Margin	Teams	Venue	Season
1	2 runs	England (196 and 194) beat India (263 and 125)	Keenan Stadium	1995–96
2	5 runs	England (91 and 296) beat Australia (262 and 120)	Adelaide Oval	1984–85
3	24 runs	England (214–4 d and 164) beat West Indies (188 and 166)	Edgbaston	1979
4	25 runs	England (222 and 231) beat Australia (302 and 126)	Stanley Park	1937
5	31 runs	Australia (300 and 102) beat England (204 and 167)	County Ground, Northampton	1937
Source: Cricinfo. Last updated: 23 October 2021.

==== Tied Tests ====
There have been no tied matches in women's Test cricket.

==== Follow On Records (Victory after Following-on) ====
No team has won a match after being made to follow-on.

=== Team scoring records ===
==== Highest totals ====
Runs	Teams	Venue	Season
603–6 d	India (v South Africa)	Chennai	2024
575–9 d	Australia (v South Africa)	Perth	2023–24
569–6 d	Australia (v England)	Woodbridge Road	1998
525	Australia (v India)	Ahmedabad	1983–84
517–8	New Zealand (v England)	Scarborough	1996
Source: Cricinfo. Last updated: 28 June 2024.

==== Lowest totals ====
Runs	Teams	Venue	Season
35	England (v Australia)	Melbourne	1957–58
38	Australia (v England)	Melbourne	1957–58
44	New Zealand (v England)	Christchurch	1934–35
47	Australia (v England)	Brisbane	1934–35
50	Netherlands (v South Africa)	Rotterdam	2007
Source: Cricinfo. Last updated: 23 October 2021.

==== Highest successful fourth innings scores (Note: Meaning the highest innings that results in the team winning the match) ====
Runs	Teams	Venue	Season
198–3	Australia (v England)	Bankstown Oval	2011
183–4	India (v England)	Wormsley Park	2014
173–3	England (v New Zealand)	Hagley Oval	1968–69
173–6	England (v New Zealand)	Cooks Gardens	1991–92
160–8	Australia (v England)	New Road, Worcester	1951
Source: Cricinfo. Last updated: 23 October 2021.

== Individual records ==
=== Individual records (batting) ===
==== Most runs in career ====
Most career runs
Runs	Inns.	Player	Period
1,935	44	(England) Jan Brittin	1979-1998
1,676	43	(England) Charlotte Edwards	1996-2015
1,594	38	(England) Rachael Heyhoe Flint	1960-1979
1,301	29	(New Zealand) Debbie Hockley	1979-1996
1,164	31	(England) Carole Hodges	1984-1992
Source: Cricinfo. Last updated: 23 October 2021.

==== Highest career batting average ====
Highest career average
Average	Inns.	Player	Period
89.37	10	(Australia) **Annabel Sutherland**	2021-2026
81.90	13	(Australia) Denise Annetts	1987-1992
62.37	10	(Australia) Lorraine Hill	1975-1977
59.88	22	(England) Enid Bakewell	1968-1979
59.17	24	(Australia) **Ellyse Perry**	2008-2026
Qualification: 10 innings. Source: Cricinfo. Last updated: 7 March 2026
If the qualification is removed, the highest career batting average list is topped by Chamani Seneviratna, who averaged 148 across two Test innings.

==== Highest individual score ====
Runs	Player	Opponent	Venue	Season
242	(Pakistan) Kiran Baluch	West Indies	Karachi	2003–04
214	(India) Mithali Raj	England	Taunton	2002
213*	(Australia) Ellyse Perry	England	Sydney	2017
210	(Australia) Annabel Sutherland	South Africa	Perth	2023–24
209*	(Australia) Karen Rolton	England	Headingley	2001
Source: Cricinfo. Last updated: 20 May 2026.

==== Highest individual score — progression of record ====
Runs	Player	Opponent	Venue	Season
72	(England) Myrtle Maclagan (in the inaugural Test Match)	v Australia	Brisbane	1934–35
119	(England) Myrtle Maclagan	v Australia	Sydney	1934–35
189	(England) Betty Snowball	v New Zealand	Lancaster Park	1934–35
190	(India) Sandhya Agarwal	v England	New Road, Worcester	1986
193	(Australia) Denise Annetts	v England	Collingham and Linton Cricket Club Ground	1987
204	(New Zealand) Kirsty Flavell	v England	Scarborough	1996
204	(Australia) Michelle Goszko	v England	Denis Compton Oval	2001
209*	(Australia) Karen Rolton	v England	Headingley	2001
214	(India) Mithali Raj	v England	Taunton	2002
242	(Pakistan) Kiran Baluch	v West Indies	Karachi	2003–04
Source: Cricinfo. Last updated: 21 October 2021.

==== Most runs in a series ====
Runs	Inns.	Player	Series
453	9	(Australia) Denise Emerson	v England, 1984-85
450	5	(England) Jan Brittin	v Australia, 1998
429	10	(England) Jan Brittin	v Australia,1984-85
412	5	(England) Enid Bakewell	v New Zealand, 1968–69
381	10	(India) Shantha Rangaswamy	v West Indies, 1976–77
Source: Cricinfo. Last updated: 21 October 2021.

==== Highest percentage of runs in a completed innings total ====
Percentage	Runs	Batsman	Opponent	Venue	Season
68.29%	112* of 164	(England) Enid Bakewell	v West Indies	Edgbaston	1979
61.01%	108 of 177	(India) Shantha Rangaswamy	v New Zealand	Dunedin	1976–77
59.30%	204 of 344	(Australia) Michelle Goszko	v England	Denis Compton Oval	2001
59.23%	77* of 130	(New Zealand) Eris Paton	v England	Eden Park	1957–58
56.56%	168* of 297	(England) **Heather Knight**	v Australia	Canberra	2022
Source: Cricinfo. Last updated: 27 January 2022.

==== Most fifties ====
50+ Scores	Player	Matches
16	(England) Jan Brittin	27
13	(England) Rachael Heyhoe Flint	22
13	(England) Charlotte Edwards	23
11	(England) Enid Bakewell	12
11	(New Zealand) Debbie Hockley	19
Source: Cricinfo. Last updated: 23 October 2021

==== Most centuries ====
Centuries	Player	Matches
5	(England) Jan Brittin	27
4	(Australia) **Annabel Sutherland**	7
4	(England) Enid Bakewell	12
4	(India) Sandhya Agarwal	13
4	(England) Claire Taylor	15
4	(New Zealand) Debbie Hockley	19
4	(England) Charlotte Edwards	23
Source: Cricinfo. Last updated: 7 March 2026

==== Most double centuries ====
Double Centuries	Player	Innings
1	(Australia) Michelle Goszko	5
1	(Pakistan) Kiran Baluch	6
1	(New Zealand) Kirsty Flavell	7
1	(Australia) Joanne Broadbent	8
1	(Australia) **Annabel Sutherland**	10
1	(India) **Shafali Verma**	12
1	(England) **Tammy Beaumont**	18
1	(India) Mithali Raj	19
1	(Australia) Karen Rolton	22
1	(Australia) **Ellyse Perry**	24
Source: Cricinfo. Last updated: 28 June 2024.

=== Individual records (bowling) ===
==== Most wickets in career ====
Wickets	Player	Matches	Average
77	(England) Mary Duggan	17	13.49
68	(Australia) Betty Wilson	11	11.80
63	(India) Diana Edulji	20	20.77
60	(England) Myrtle Maclagan	14	15.58
60	(Australia) Cathryn Fitzpatrick	13	19.11
60	(India) Shubhangi Kulkarni	19	27.45
Source: Cricinfo. Last updated: 23 October 2021.

==== Best career bowling average ====
Average	Player	Balls	Wickets
11.80	(Australia) Betty Wilson	2,885	68
12.73	(Australia) Sally Moffat	1,025	15
13.49	(England) Mary Duggan	3,734	77
15.25	(England) Molly Hide	2,064	36
15.58	(England) Myrtle Maclagan	3,432	60
Qualification: 1000 balls bowled. Source: Cricinfo. Last updated: 23 October 2021.
Note:If the qualification is removed, the best career average record is at 0.50 runs per wicket. This record is held by the South African Susan Benade, who took 2 wickets with 1 run conceded off 24 balls.

==== Series ====
Most wickets in a series
Wickets	Matches	Player	Series
23	3	(England) Julia Greenwood	v West Indies, 1979
23	5	(India) Shubhangi Kulkarni	v West Indies, 1976–77
21	3	(Australia) Betty Wilson	v England, 1957–58
21	5	(England) Avril Starling	v Australia,1984-85
20	3	(England) Myrtle Maclagan	v Australia, 1934–35
20	3	(England) Mary Duggan	v Australia, 1951
20	4	(England) Avril Starling	v Australia,1984-85
Source: Cricinfo. Last updated: 23 October 2021.

==== Best figures in an innings ====
Bowling	Player	Opponent	Venue	Season
8–53	(India) Neetu David	v England	Keenan Stadium	1995–96
8–66	(Australia) Ashleigh Gardner	v England	Trent Bridge	2023
8–77	(India) Sneh Rana	v South Africa	Chennai	2024
7–6	(England) Mary Duggan	v Australia	Junction Oval	1957–58
7–7	(Australia) Betty Wilson	v England	Junction Oval	1957–58
Source: Cricinfo. Last updated: 30 June 2024.

==== Best figures in an innings – progression of record ====
Bowling	Player	Opponent	Venue	Season
7–10	(England) Myrtle Maclagan (in the inaugural Test Match)	v Australia	Brisbane	1934–35
7–6	(England) Mary Duggan	v Australia	Junction Oval	1957–58
8–53	(India) Neetu David	v England	Keenan Stadium	1995–96
Calculated at the conclusion of each Test. Last updated: 23 October 2021.

==== Match ====
Best figures in a match
Bowling	Player	Opponent	Venue	Season
13–226	(Pakistan) Shaiza Khan	v West Indies	Karachi	2003–04
12-165	(Australia) **Ashleigh Gardner**	v England	Trent Bridge	2023
11–16	(Australia) Betty Wilson	v England	Junction Oval	1957–58
11–63	(England) Julia Greenwood	v West Indies	Canterbury	1979
11–107	(England) Lucy Pearson	v Australia	Sydney	2003
10–188	(India) Sneh Rana	v South Africa	Chennai	2024
Source: Cricinfo. Last updated: 20 May 2026.

=== Individual records (fielding) ===
==== Most catches in Test career ====
Rank	Catches	Player	Matches
1	**25**	(England) Carole Hodges	18
2	**21**	(India) Sudha Shah	21
3	**20**	(Australia) Lyn Fullston	12
4	**15**	(England) Hazel Sanders	12
4	**15**	(England) Lydia Greenway	14
Source: Cricinfo. Last updated: 23 October 2021.

=== Individual records (wicket-keeping) ===
==== Most dismissals ====
Dismissals	Player	Matches
**58** (46 c. 12 st.)	(Australia) Christina Matthews	20
**43** (39 c. 4 st.)	(England) Jane Smit	21
**36** (19 c. 17 st.)	(England) Shirley Hodges	11
**28** (16 c. 12 st.)	(New Zealand) Bev Brentnall	10
**24** (14 c. 10 st.)	(Australia) Margaret Jennings	8
**24** (22 c. 2 st.)	(Australia) Alyssa Healy	11
Source: Cricinfo. Last updated: 23 October 2021.

==== Most catches ====
Catches	Player	Matches
46	(Australia) Christina Matthews	20
39	(England) Jane Smit	21
22	(Australia) Alyssa Healy	11
22	(England) Amy Jones	9
20	(Australia) Julia Price	10
19	(England) Shirley Hodges	11
Source: Cricinfo. Last updated: 13 July 2026.

==== Most stumpings ====
Most stumpings
Stumpings	Player	Matches
17	(England) Shirley Hodges	11
12	(New Zealand) Bev Brentnall	10
12	(Australia) Christina Matthews	20
11	(New Zealand) Edna Ryan	5
10	(India) Fowzieh Khalili	8
10	(Australia) Margaret Jennings	8
Source: Cricinfo. Last updated: 23 October 2021.

=== Individual records (other) ===
==== Most matches played ====
Matches	Player	Period
27	(England) Jan Brittin	1979–1998
23	(England) Charlotte Edwards	1996–2015
22	(England) Rachael Heyhoe Flint	1960–1979
21	(India) Sudha Shah	1976–1991
21	(England) Jane Smit	1992–2006
Source: Cricinfo. Last updated: 23 October 2021.

==== Most matches played as captain ====
Matches	Player	Won	Lost	Drawn	Tied
14	(New Zealand) Trish McKelvey	2	3	9	0
12	(England) Rachael Heyhoe Flint	2	0	10	0
12	(India) Shantha Rangaswamy	1	2	9	0
11	(Australia) Belinda Clark	3	1	7	0
11	(England) Clare Connor	2	3	6	0
11	(England) Molly Hide	4	2	5	0
Source: Cricinfo. Last updated: 23 October 2021.

== Partnership records ==
=== Highest partnerships (by wicket) ===
Partnership	Runs	Batters		Team	Opponent	Venue	Season
1st wicket	292	Smriti Mandhana (149)	Shafali Verma (205)	India	v South Africa	M. A. Chidambaram Stadium	2024
2nd wicket	275	Thirush Kamini (192)	Poonam Raut (130)	India	v South Africa	Gangotri Glades Cricket Ground	2014–15
3rd wicket	309	Lindsay Reeler (110*)	Denise Annetts (193)	Australia	v England	Collingham and Linton Cricket Club Ground	1987
4th wicket	253	Karen Rolton (209*)	Louise Broadfoot (71)	Australia	v England	Headingley	2001
5th wicket	143	Harmanpreet Kaur (69)	Richa Ghosh (86)	India	v South Africa	M. A. Chidambaram Stadium	2024
6th wicket	229	Jodie Fields (139)	Rachael Haynes (98)	Australia	v England	New Road, Worcester	2009
7th wicket	157	Mithali Raj (214)	Jhulan Goswami (62)	India	v England	Taunton	2002
8th wicket	181	Sally Griffiths (133)	Debbie Wilson (92*)	Australia	v New Zealand	Cornwall Park	1989–90
9th wicket	107	Beverly Botha (72)	Maureen Payne (33)	South Africa	v New Zealand	Newlands	1971–72
10th wicket	119	Shelley Nitschke (81*)	Clea Smith (42)	Australia	v England	County Ground, Hove	2005
Source: Cricinfo. Last updated: 28 June 2024

=== Highest partnerships (by runs) ===
Rank	Runs	Batsmen		Team	Opponent	Venue	Season
1	309 (3rd wicket)	Lindsay Reeler (110*)	Denise Annetts (193)	Australia	v England	Collingham and Linton Cricket Club Ground	1987
2	292 (1st wicket)	Smriti Mandhana (149)	Shafali Verma (205)	India	v South Africa	M. A. Chidambaram Stadium, Chennai	2024
3	275 (2nd wicket)	Thirush Kamini (192)	Poonam Raut (130)	India	v South Africa	Gangotri Glades Cricket Ground	2014–15
4	253 (4th wicket)	Karen Rolton (209*)	Louise Broadfoot (71)	Australia	v England	Headingley	2001
5	241 (1st wicket)	Kiran Baluch (242)	Sajjida Shah (98)	Pakistan	v West Indies	National Stadium, Karachi	2003–04
Source: Cricinfo. Last updated: 28 June 2024

== See also ==
- Cricket statistics
