= India women's cricket team in England in 2022 =

International cricket tour

| | England women | India women |
- Dates: 10 – 24 September 2022
| Captains | Amy Jones | Harmanpreet Kaur |

One Day International series
- Results: India women won the 3-match series 3–0
| Most runs | Danni Wyatt (116) | Harmanpreet Kaur (221) |
| Most wickets | Kate Cross (7) | Renuka Singh (8) |
- Player of the series: Harmanpreet Kaur (Ind)

Twenty20 International series
- Results: England women won the 3-match series 2–1
| Most runs | Sophia Dunkley (115) | Smriti Mandhana (111) |
| Most wickets | Sarah Glenn (6) | Sneh Rana (5) |
- Player of the series: Sophia Dunkley (Eng)

The India women's cricket team toured England to play against the England women's cricket team in September 2022. The tour consisted of three Women's One Day Internationals (WODIs) and three Women's Twenty20 Internationals (WT20Is). The WODI matches were part of 2022–2025 ICC Women's Championship, with the final match of the tour taking place at Lord's.

In August 2022, India named their squads for the tour and it was announced that Jhulan Goswami would retire from international cricket after playing the series. On 8 September 2022, England captain Nat Sciver announced that she decided to withdraw from the series "to focus on her mental health and well being". Amy Jones was named as England's captain for the WT20I series. Eventually, Jones was named as captain for England's WODI squad.

England won the first WT20I by 9 wickets, as the match started with both the teams and match officials paying tribute to Queen Elizabeth II following her death on 8 September. India won the second WT20I by 8 wickets, to level the series 1–1. England claimed the series 2–1 after winning the third match by 7 wickets.

India won the first two matches of the WODI series to get an unassailable lead, winning their first series in this format in England since 1999. India won the last WODI to clean sweep the series 3–0.

== Squads ==
| WODIs | | WT20Is | |
| England | India | England | India |
|---|---|---|---|
| Amy Jones (c); Tammy Beaumont; Lauren Bell; Maia Bouchier; Alice Capsey; Kate Cross; Freya Davies; Alice Davidson-Richards; Charlie Dean; Sophia Dunkley; Sophie Ecclestone; Freya Kemp; Emma Lamb; Issy Wong; Danni Wyatt | Harmanpreet Kaur (c); Smriti Mandhana (vc); Simran Bahadur; Taniya Bhatia (wk); Yastika Bhatia (wk); Harleen Deol; Rajeshwari Gayakwad; Jhulan Goswami; Dayalan Hemalatha; Sabbhineni Meghana; Sneh Rana; Jemimah Rodrigues; Meghna Singh; Renuka Singh; Deepti Sharma; Pooja Vastrakar; Shafali Verma | Amy Jones (c); ~~Nat Sciver (c)~~; Lauren Bell; Maia Bouchier; Alice Capsey; Kate Cross; Alice Davidson-Richards; Freya Davies; Sophia Dunkley; Sophie Ecclestone; Sarah Glenn; Freya Kemp; Bryony Smith; Issy Wong; Danni Wyatt | Harmanpreet Kaur (c); Smriti Mandhana (vc); Simran Bahadur; Taniya Bhatia (wk); Rajeshwari Gayakwad; Richa Ghosh (wk); Dayalan Hemalatha; Sabbhineni Meghana; Kiran Navgire; Sneh Rana; Jemimah Rodrigues; Meghna Singh; Renuka Singh; Deepti Sharma; Pooja Vastrakar; Shafali Verma; Radha Yadav |

On 12 September 2022, Alice Davidson-Richards was added to England's WT20I squad for the remaining two matches.

== Warm-up match ==
6 September 2022
11:00
Scorecard

| India; 149 (19.5 overs) | v | England Development; 15/1 (2 overs) |
| Sabbhineni Meghana 41 (30); Ryana MacDonald-Gay 6/18 (3.5 overs) | | Tammy Beaumont 8* (7); Deepti Sharma 1/10 (1 over) |

No result
Riverside Ground, Chester-le-Street
Umpires: Joanne Ibbotson (Eng) and Jasmine Naeem (Eng)

- No toss.
- Rain prevented any further play.

== WT20I series ==
=== 1st WT20I ===
10 September 2022
19:00 (N)
Scorecard

| India; 132/7 (20 overs) | v | England; 134/1 (13 overs) |
| Deepti Sharma 29* (24); Sarah Glenn 4/23 (4 overs) | | Sophia Dunkley 61* (44); Sneh Rana 1/31 (3 overs) |

England Women won by 9 wickets
Riverside Ground, Chester-le-Street
Umpires: Jasmine Naeem (Eng) and Paul Pollard (Eng)
Player of the match: Sarah Glenn (Eng)

- England Women won the toss and elected to field.
- Lauren Bell (Eng) and Kiran Navgire (Ind) both made their WT20I debuts.

=== 2nd WT20I ===
13 September 2022
18:00 (N)
Scorecard

| England; 142/6 (20 overs) | v | India; 146/2 (16.4 overs) |
| Freya Kemp 51* (27); Sneh Rana 3/24 (4 overs) | | Smriti Mandhana 79* (53); Sophie Ecclestone 1/22 (3 overs) |

India Women won by 8 wickets
County Cricket Ground, Derby
Umpires: Paul Pollard (Eng) and Sue Redfern (Eng)
Player of the match: Smriti Mandhana (Ind)

- England Women won the toss and elected to bat.

=== 3rd WT20I ===
15 September 2022
18:30 (N)
Scorecard

| India; 122/8 (20 overs) | v | England; 126/3 (18.2 overs) |
| Richa Ghosh 33 (22); Sophie Ecclestone 3/25 (4 overs) | | Sophia Dunkley 49 (44); Radha Yadav 1/14 (4 overs) |

England Women won by 7 wickets
Bristol County Ground, Bristol
Umpires: Paul Pollard (Eng) and Sue Redfern (Eng)
Player of the match: Sophie Ecclestone (Eng)

- England Women won the toss and elected to field.

== WODI series ==
=== 1st WODI ===
18 September 2022
11:00
Scorecard

| England; 227/7 (50 overs) | v | India; 232/3 (44.2 overs) |
| Alice Davidson-Richards 50* (61); Deepti Sharma 2/33 (10 overs) | | Smriti Mandhana 91 (99); Kate Cross 2/43 (10 overs) |

India Women won by 7 wickets
County Cricket Ground, Hove
Umpires: Anna Harris (Eng) and Sue Redfern (Eng)
Player of the match: Smriti Mandhana (Ind)

- India Women won the toss and elected to field.
- Alice Capsey (Eng) made her WODI debut.
- Women's Championship points: India 2, England 0.

=== 2nd WODI ===
21 September 2022
13:00 (D/N)
Scorecard

| India; 333/5 (50 overs) | v | England; 245 (44.2 overs) |
| Harmanpreet Kaur 143* (111); Charlie Dean 1/39 (10 overs) | | Danni Wyatt 65 (58); Renuka Singh 4/57 (10 overs) |

India Women won by 88 runs
St Lawrence Ground, Canterbury
Umpires: Mike Burns (Eng) and Anna Harris (Eng)
Player of the match: Harmanpreet Kaur (Ind)

- England Women won the toss and elected to field.
- Freya Kemp (Eng) made her WODI debut.
- Smriti Mandhana (Ind) became the fastest India Women's player, to score 3,000 runs in terms of innings in WODIs (76).
- Women's Championship points: India 2, England 0.

=== 3rd WODI ===
24 September 2022
11:00
Scorecard

| India; 169 (45.4 overs) | v | England; 153 (43.3 overs) |
| Deepti Sharma 68* (106); Kate Cross 4/26 (10 overs) | | Charlie Dean 47 (80); Renuka Singh 4/29 (10 overs) |

India Women won by 16 runs
Lord's, London
Umpires: Anna Harris (Eng) and Martin Saggers (Eng)
Player of the match: Renuka Singh (Ind)

- England Women won the toss and elected to field.
- Tammy Beaumont (Eng) played in her 100th WODI.
- Women's Championship points: India 2, England 0.
