= 2024–25 Super Smash (women's cricket) =

Cricket tournament

2024–25 Women's Super Smash
- Dates: 26 December 2024 – 2 February 2025
- Administrator: New Zealand Cricket
- Cricket format: Twenty20
- Tournament format(s): Double round-robin and Finals
- Champions: Wellington Blaze (9th title)
- Runners-up: Otago Sparks
- Participants: 6
- Matches: 32
- Most runs: Amelia Kerr (441) (Wellington Blaze)
- Most wickets: Eden Carson (18) (Otago Sparks)
- Official website: Super Smash

The 2024–25 Dream11 Super Smash was the eighteenth season of the women's Super Smash Twenty20 cricket competition played in New Zealand. It took place from 26 December 2024 to 2 February 2025, with 6 provincial teams taking part. Wellington Blaze were the defending champions.

The tournament was run alongside the 2024–25 Hallyburton Johnstone Shield.

The tournament was won by the Wellington Blaze, who defeated the Otago Sparks in the final.

== Competition format ==
Teams play in a double round-robin in a group of six, therefore playing 10 matches overall. Matches are played using a Twenty20 format. The top team in the group advance straight to the final, whilst the second and third placed teams play off in an elimination final.

The group works on a points system with positions being based on the total points. Points are awarded as follows:

Result	Points
Win	4 Ponts
Tie / No Result	2 Points
Loss	0 Points

== Teams and standings ==
=== Points table ===
Pos	Team	Pld	W	L	T	NR	Pts	NRR	Qualification
1	Otago Sparks	10	7	3	0	0	28	0.246	Advance to Grand Final
2	Wellington Blaze	10	6	3	0	1	26	0.589	Advance to Elimination Final
3	Northern Brave	10	4	3	0	3	22	0.713	Advance to Elimination Final
4	Auckland Hearts	10	5	4	0	1	22	0.149	
5	Canterbury Magicians	10	4	6	0	0	16	−0.456	
6	Central Hinds	10	1	8	0	1	6	−1.007	

Source: Dream11 Super Smash, ESPNcricinfo

=== Match summary ===
Team	Group matches										Play-offs	
Team	1	2	3	4	5	6	7	8	9	10	EF	F
Auckland Hearts	2	2	6	6	6	10	10	14	18	22		
Canterbury Magicians	4	4	4	8	8	12	12	12	16	16		
Central Hinds	0	0	0	0	0	0	4	6	6	6		
Northern Brave	2	2	6	10	14	14	16	16	20	22	L	
Otago Sparks	0	4	8	12	16	20	20	24	24	28	→	L
Wellington Blaze	4	8	12	12	12	16	20	24	24	26	W	W

Win	Loss	Tie	No result	Eliminated

- Note: The total points at the end of each group match are listed.
- Note: Click on the points or results to see the match summary.

== League stage ==
Match 1
26 December 2024
14:10
Scorecard

Northern Brave; 67/7 (12 overs)	v	Auckland Hearts
Caitlin Gurrey 15 (15); Fran Jonas 2/13 (2 overs)

No result
Seddon Park, Hamilton
Umpires: Billy Bowden and Wayne Knights

- Auckland Hearts won the toss and elected to field.
- Rain prevented any further play.
- The match was reduced to 12 overs per side due to rain.
- Auckland Hearts were set a revised target of 69 runs from 12 overs due to rain.

Match 2
27 December 2024
12:40
Scorecard

Canterbury Magicians; 137/7 (20 overs)	v	Otago Sparks; 125/7 (20 overs)
Shikha Pandey 63 (48); Kirstie Gordon 2/25 (4 overs)		Suzie Bates 50 (41); Shikha Pandey 2/17 (4 overs)

Canterbury Magicians won by 12 runs
Molyneux Park, Alexandra
Umpires: John Dempsey and Neil Louw
Player of the match: Shikha Pandey (Canterbury Magicians)

- Otago Sparks won the toss and elected to field.

Match 3
29 December 2024
12:40
Scorecard

Auckland Hearts; 110/8 (20 overs)	v	Otago Sparks; 112/3 (15.1 overs)
Brooke Halliday 22 (19); Eden Carson 3/28 (4 overs)		Polly Inglis 29* (21); Fran Jonas 2/21 (4 overs)

Otago Sparks won by 7 wickets
Molyneux Park, Alexandra
Umpires: James Blunt and Kannan Jagannathan
Player of the match: Eden Carson (Otago Sparks)

- Otago Sparks won the toss and elected to field.

Match 4
31 December 2024
12:40
Scorecard

Central Hinds; 88/9 (20 overs)	v	Otago Sparks; 92/9 (19.5 overs)
Hollie Armitage 32* (47); Eden Carson 3/19 (4 overs)		Olivia Gain 24 (27); Hannah Rowe 3/13 (4 overs)

Otago Sparks won by 1 wicket
Molyneux Park, Alexandra
Umpires: James Blunt and John Dempsey
Player of the match: Eden Carson (Otago Sparks)

- Central Hinds won the toss and elected to bat.

Match 5
1 January 2025
12:40
Scorecard

Wellington Blaze; 150/3 (20 overs)	v	Northern Brave; 146/9 (20 overs)
Amelia Kerr 67* (51); Marama Downes 1/20 (4 overs)		Carol Agafili 40 (28); Amelia Kerr 4/18 (4 overs)

Wellington Blaze won by 4 runs
Seddon Park, Hamilton
Umpires: Cory Black and Stuart Martin
Player of the match: Amelia Kerr (Wellington Blaze)

- Wellington Blaze won the toss and elected to bat.

Match 6
3 January 2025
12:40
Scorecard

Auckland Hearts; 122/7 (20 overs)	v	Canterbury Magicians; 111/7 (19 overs)
Lauren Down 47* (46); Shikha Pandey 2/17 (4 overs)		Kate Anderson 38 (47); Fran Jonas 2/13 (4 overs)

Auckland Hearts won by 7 runs (DLS method)
Eden Park, Auckland
Umpires: Kannan Jagannathan and Tina Semmens
Player of the match: Fran Jonas (Auckland Hearts)

- Canterbury Magicians won the toss and elected to field.
- Canterbury Magicians were set a revised target of 119 runs from 19 overs due to rain.

Match 7
4 January 2025
12:40
Scorecard

Wellington Blaze; 118/8 (20 overs)	v	Central Hinds; 89 (19 overs)
Jess Kerr 59 (45); Rosemary Mair 2/22 (4 overs)		Rosemary Mair 23 (21); Leigh Kasperek 4/22 (4 overs)

Wellington Blaze won by 25 runs
Saxton Oval, Nelson
Umpires: John Dempsey and Christelle High
Player of the match: Jess Kerr (Wellington Blaze)

- Wellington Blaze won the toss and elected to field.

Match 8
6 January 2025
12:40
Scorecard

Central Hinds; 112 (18.4 overs)	v	Northern Brave; 115/1 (12.4 overs)
Hollie Armitage 61 (48); Chamari Athapaththu 4/16 (4 overs)		Jess Watkin 51* (32); Ocean Bartlett 1/9 (2.4 overs)

Northern Brave won by 9 wickets
Saxton Oval, Nelson
Umpires: Christelle High and Wayne Knights
Player of the match: Chamari Athapaththu (Northern Brave)

- Central Hinds won the toss and elected to bat.

Match 9
7 January 2025
18:20 (N)
Scorecard

Otago Sparks; 150/5 (20 overs)	v	Canterbury Magicians; 135/8 (20 overs)
Olivia Gain 48 (42); Shikha Pandey 1/19 (4 overs)		Kate Anderson 43 (37); Hayley Jensen 2/22 (4 overs)

Otago Sparks won by 15 runs
Hagley Oval, Christchurch
Umpires: Chris Brown and Tina Semmens
Player of the match: Olivia Gain (Otago Sparks)

- Canterbury Magicians won the toss and elected to field.

Match 10
9 January 2025
12:40
Scorecard

Central Hinds; 113 (19.4 overs)	v	Wellington Blaze; 114/2 (15.1 overs)
Hollie Armitage 47 (42); Jess Kerr 3/24 (4 overs)		Rebecca Burns 50 (35); Ocean Bartlett 1/16 (3 overs)

Wellington Blaze won by 8 wickets
Basin Reserve, Wellington
Umpires: Billy Bowden and Tyron Davies
Player of the match: Xara Jetly (Wellington Blaze)

- Central Hinds won the toss and elected to bat.

Match 11
10 January 2025
14:10
Scorecard

Auckland Hearts; 138/6 (20 overs)	v	Canterbury Magicians; 139/1 (17.2 overs)
Lauren Down 25* (24); Melissa Banks 2/40 (4 overs)		Kate Anderson 75* (54); Molly Penfold 1/31 (3 overs)

Canterbury Magicians won by 9 wickets
Hagley Oval, Christchurch
Umpires: Chris Brown and John Dempsey
Player of the match: Kate Anderson (Canterbury Magicians)

- Canterbury Magicians won the toss and elected to field.

Match 12
12 January 2025
12:40
Scorecard

Central Hinds; 90 (18.4 overs)	v	Otago Sparks; 92/6 (18.1 overs)
Hollie Armitage 22 (21); Eden Carson 5/18 (4 overs)		Polly Inglis 21 (25); Claudia Green 2/12 (4 overs); Rosemary Mair 2/12 (4 overs)

Otago Sparks won by 4 wickets
Fitzherbert Park, Palmerston North
Umpires: Kannan Jagannathan and Allen Stanley
Player of the match: Eden Carson (Otago Sparks)

- Otago Sparks won the toss and elected to field.

Match 13
13 January 2025
12:40
Scorecard

Northern Brave; 152/7 (20 overs)	v	Auckland Hearts; 139/7 (20 overs)
Chamari Athapaththu 71 (52); Prue Catton 2/13 (2 overs)		Lauren Down 40* (27); Chamari Athapaththu 2/23 (4 overs)

Northern Brave won by 13 runs
Seddon Park, Hamilton
Umpires: Billy Bowden and Vinit Mahna
Player of the match: Chamari Athapaththu Northern Brave)

- Auckland Hearts won the toss and elected to field.

Match 14
14 January 2025
12:40
Scorecard

Wellington Blaze; 109/9 (20 overs)	v	Otago Sparks; 111/3 (18.4 overs)
Jess Kerr 56 (50); Kirstie Gordon 2/13 (4 overs)		Caitlin Blakely 52* (45); Jess Kerr 2/10 (4 overs)

Otago Sparks won by 7 wickets
Basin Reserve, Wellington
Umpires: Cory Black and James Blunt
Player of the match: Caitlin Blakely (Otago Sparks)

- Wellington Blaze won the toss and elected to field.

Match 15
15 January 2025
12:40
Scorecard

Auckland Hearts; 139/7 (20 overs)	v	Central Hinds; 130/7 (20 overs)
Maddy Green 57 (49); Claudia Green 2/19 (4 overs)		Kerry-Anne Tomlinson 48 (50); Molly Penfold 2/23 (4 overs)

Auckland Hearts won by 9 runs
McLean Park, Napier
Umpires: Chris Brown and Tyron Davies
Player of the match: Bree Illing (Auckland Hearts)

- Central Hinds won the toss and elected to field.

Match 16
16 January 2025
12:40
Scorecard

Otago Sparks; 110/9 (20 overs)	v	Northern Brave; 113/3 (14 overs)
Suzie Bates 26 (22); Chamari Athapaththu 3/19 (4 overs)		Jess Watkin 41 (31); Eden Carson 2/32 (4 overs)

Northern Brave won by 7 wickets
University of Otago Oval, Dunedin
Umpires: Shaun Haig and Tina Semmens
Player of the match: Jess Watkin (Northern Brave)

- Otago Sparks won the toss and elected to bat.

Match 17
17 January 2025
14:10
Scorecard

Canterbury Magicians; 119 (19.3 overs)	v	Central Hinds; 120/2 (17 overs)
Natalie Cox 28 (27); Jessica Ogden 3/19 (4 overs)		Hollie Armitage 72* (59); Sarah Asmussen 1/29 (3 overs)

Central Hinds won by 8 wickets
McLean Park, Napier
Umpires: Cory Black and Scott Oliver
Player of the match: Hollie Armitage (Central Hinds)

- Canterbury Magicians won the toss and elected to field.

Match 18
18 January 2025
10:40
Scorecard

Wellington Blaze; 120/5 (20 overs)	v	Otago Sparks; 123/3 (18 overs)
Sophie Devine 38 (35); Emma Black 1/18 (4 overs)		Bella James 40 (30); Nicole Baird 2/20 (4 overs)

Otago Sparks won by 7 wickets
University of Otago Oval, Dunedin
Umpires: James Blunt and Chris Brown
Player of the match: Bella James (Otago Sparks)

- Wellington Blaze won the toss and elected to bat.

Match 19
19 January 2025
12:40
Scorecard

Northern Brave; 138/5 (20 overs)	v	Canterbury Magicians; 141/6 (19.3 overs)
Caitlin Gurrey 39 (41); Sarah Asmussen 1/23 (4 overs)		Madeline Penna 55 (51); Nensi Patel 1/19 (3 overs)

Canterbury Magicians won by 4 wickets
Seddon Park, Hamilton
Umpires: Greg Pennell and SB Martin
Player of the match: Madeline Penna (Canterbury Magicians)

- Canterbury Magicians won the toss and elected to field.

Match 20
20 January 2025
12:40
Scorecard

Wellington Blaze; 134/4 (20 overs)	v	Auckland Hearts; 121/6 (20 overs)
Amelia Kerr 75* (60); Bree Illing 2/12 (4 overs)		Maddy Green 48 (47); Xara Jetly 3/15 (4 overs)

Wellington Blaze won by 13 runs
Basin Reserve, Wellington
Umpires: Shaun Haig and Craig Pryor
Player of the match: Amelia Kerr (Wellington Blaze)

- Auckland Hearts won the toss and elected to field.

Match 21
21 January 2025
14:10
Scorecard

Northern Brave	v	Central Hinds

Match abandoned
Seddon Park, Hamilton
Umpires: Cory Black and Tina Semmenns

- No toss.
- No play was possible due to rain.

Match 22
22 January 2025
12:40
Scorecard

Wellington Blaze; 171/3 (20 overs)	v	Canterbury Magicians; 132 (18.2 overs)
Rebecca Burns 59* (51); Shikha Pandey 2/29 (4 overs)		Izzy Sharp 52 (34); Jess Kerr 4/11 (4 overs)

Wellington Blaze won by 39 runs
Basin Reserve, Wellington
Umpires: Shaun Haig and Brad Wilson
Player of the match: Jess Kerr(Wellington Blaze)

- Wellington Blaze won the toss and elected to bat.

Match 23
23 January 2025
12:40
Scorecard

Auckland Hearts; 162/2 (20 overs)	v	Otago Sparks; 137/7 (20 overs)
Maddy Green 54* (39); Kirstie Gordon 2/21 (4 overs)		Anna Browning 25* (16); Maddy Green 2/10 (2 overs)

Auckland Hearts won by 25 runs
Eden Park, Auckland
Umpires: Chris Brown and Craig Pryor
Player of the match: Maddy Green (Auckland Hearts)

- Otago Sparks won the toss and elected to field.

Match 24
24 January 2025
12:40
Scorecard

Canterbury Magicians; 101/8 (20 overs)	v	Wellington Blaze; 104/0 (11.2 overs)
Natalie Cox 23 (26); Sophie Devine 5/13 (4 overs)		Rebecca Burns 69* (41)

Wellington Blaze won by 10 wickets
Hagley Oval, Christchurch
Umpires: Shaun Haig and Pete Pasco
Player of the match: Sophie Devine (Wellington Blaze)

- Canterbury Magicians won the toss and elected to bat.

Match 25
25 January 2025
12:40
Scorecard

Northern Brave; 127/8 (20 overs)	v	Otago Sparks; 128/4 (14.5 overs)
Caitlin Gurrey 39 (35); Kirstie Gordon 2/19 (4 overs)		Hayley Jensen 49* (34); Chamari Athapaththu 2/17 (3 overs)

Otago Sparks won by 6 wickets
Bay Oval, Mount Maunganui
Umpires: Christelle High and Kannan Jagannathan
Player of the match: Hayley Jensen (Otago Sparks)

- Otago Sparks won the toss and elected to field.

Match 26
26 January 2025
12:40
Scorecard

Canterbury Magicians; 135/6 (20 overs)	v	Central Hinds; 90 (18.2 overs)
Kate Anderson 45 (43); Hannah Rowe 2/28 (4 overs)		Hannah Rowe 32 (35); Kate Anderson 2/12 (2.2 overs)

Canterbury Magicians won by 45 runs
Hagley Oval, Christchurch
Umpires: Cory Black and Regan Dalley
Player of the match: Shikha Pandey (Canterbury Magicians)

- Central Hinds won the toss and elected to field.

Match 27
27 January 2025
18:20 (D/N)
Scorecard

Auckland Hearts; 160/5 (20 overs)	v	Wellington Blaze; 115/9 (20 overs)
Saachi Shahri 50 (46); Maitlan Brown 3/22 (4 overs)		Amelia Kerr 30 (30); Fran Jonas 3/20 (4 overs)

Auckland Hearts won by 45 runs
Eden Park, Auckland
Umpires: Greg Pennell and Craig Pryor

- Auckland Hearts won the toss and elected to bat.

Match 28
28 January 2025
14:00
Scorecard

Canterbury Magicians; 117/7 (20 overs)	v	Northern Brave; 118/4 (16.2 overs)
Kate Anderson 33 (32); Sarah Glenn 2/20 (4 overs)		Chamari Athapaththu 37 (25); Jessica Simmons 2/18 (2.2 overs)

Northern Brave won by 6 wickets
Hagley Oval, Christchurch
Umpires: Billy Bowden and Regan Dalley
Player of the match: Sarah Glenn (Northern Brave)

- Canterbury Magicians won the toss and elected to bat.

Match 29
29 January 2025
14:10
Scorecard

Auckland Hearts; 139/3 (20 overs)	v	Central Hinds; 119/8 (20 overs)
Bella Armstrong 59* (47); Ashtuti Kumar 2/32 (4 overs)		Kerry-Anne Tomlinson 30 (25); Fran Jonas 3/14 (4 overs)

Auckland Hearts won by 20 runs
McLean Park, Napier
Umpires: Greg Pennell and Scott Oliver
Player of the match: Amie Hucker (Auckland Hearts)

- Central Hinds won the toss and elected to field.

Match 30
30 January 2025
12:40
Scorecard

Wellington Blaze; 119/6 (20 overs)	v	Northern Brave
Amelia Kerr 68* (56); Chamari Athapaththu 2/21 (4 overs)

No result
Basin Reserve, Wellington
Umpires: Shaun Haig and Tina Semmens

- Wellington Blaze won the toss and elected to bat.

== Finals ==
Elimination Final			Grand Final
			1	Otago Sparks	96/9 (20 overs)
2	Wellington Blaze	133/6 (20 overs)	EW	Wellington Blaze	104/8 (20 overs)
3	Northern Brave	110 (18.4 overs)

=== Elimination Final ===
Elimination Final
1 February 2025
12:40
Scorecard

Wellington Blaze; 133/6 (20 overs)	v	Northern Brave; 110 (18.4 overs)
Amelia Kerr 29 (24); Kayley Knight 2/16 (3 overs)		Jess Watkin 25 (13); Amelia Kerr 4/19 (4 overs)

Wellington Blaze won by 23 runs
Basin Reserve, Wellington
Umpires: John Dempsey and Tina Semmens
Player of the match: Amelia Kerr (Wellington Blaze)

- Northern Brave won the toss and elected to field.

=== Grand Final ===
Grand Final
2 February 2025
12:40
Scorecard

Wellington Blaze; 104/8 (20 overs)	v	Otago Sparks; 96/9 (20 overs)
Hannah Darlington 26 (34); Felicity Leydon-Davis 3/16 (3 overs)		Felicity Leydon-Davis 29* (29); Hannah Darlington 4/16 (4 overs)

Wellington Blaze won by 8 runs
Basin Reserve, Wellington
Umpires: Kim Cotton and Shaun Haig
Player of the match: Hannah Darlington (Wellington Blaze)

- Wellington Blaze won the toss and elected to bat.

== Season statistics ==
Highest team total
Score (overs)	Team	Opponent	Result	Venue	Date
204/8 (20.0)	Auckland Hearts	Wellington Blaze	Won	Eden Park, Auckland	27 January 2025
197/6 (20.0)	Northern Brave	Auckland Hearts	Won	Seddon Park, Hamilton	13 January 2025
196/4 (20.0)	Otago Sparks	Canterbury Magicians	Won	Hagley Oval, Christchurch	7 January 2025
171/3 (20.0)	Wellington Blaze	Canterbury Magicians	Won	Basin Reserve, Wellington	22 January 2025
162/2 (20.0)	Auckland Hearts	Otago Sparks	Won	Eden Park, Auckland	23 January 2025

- Source: ESPNCricinfo

Lowest team totals (completed innings)
Score (overs)	Team	Opponent	Venue	Date
89/9 (20.0)	Central Hinds	Otago Sparks	Molyneux Park, Alexandra	31 December 2024
89 (19.0)	Central Hinds	Wellington Blaze	Saxton Oval, Nelson	4 January 2025
90 (18.4)	Central Hinds	Otago Sparks	Fitzherbert Park, Palmerston North	12 January 2025
90 (18.2)	Central Hinds	Canterbury Magicians	Hagley Oval, Christchurch	26 January 2025
96/9 (20.0)	Otago Sparks	Wellington Blaze	Basin Reserve, Wellington	2 February 2025

- Source: ESPNCricinfo

Most individual runs
Runs	Player	Team
441	Amelia Kerr	Wellington Blaze
326	Jess Kerr	Wellington Blaze
304	Lauren Down	Auckland Hearts
294	Kate Anderson	Canterbury Magicians
269	Maddy Green	Auckland Hearts
269	Rebecca Burns	Wellington Blaze

- Source: ESPNcricinfo

Highest individual score
Runs	Batsmen	Team	Opposition
75*	Kate Anderson	Canterbury Magicians	Auckland Hearts
75*	Amelia Kerr	Wellington Blaze	Auckland Hearts
72*	Hollie Armitage	Central Hinds	Canterbury Magicians
71	Chamari Athapaththu	Northern Brave	Auckland Hearts
69*	Rebecca Burns	Wellington Blaze	Canterbury Magicians

- Source: ESPNcricinfo

Most wickets
Wickets	Player	Team
18	Eden Carson	Otago Sparks
16	Kirstie Gordon	Otago Sparks
15	Chamari Athapaththu	Northern Brave
15	Amelia Kerr	Wellington Blaze
14	Fran Jonas	Auckland Hearts
14	Jess Kerr	Wellington Blaze

- Source: ESPNcricinfo

Best individual bowling figures
BBI	Player	Team	Opposition
5/13	Sophie Devine	Wellington Blaze	Canterbury Magicians
5/18	Eden Carson	Otago Sparks	Central Hinds
4/11	Jess Kerr	Wellington Blaze	Canterbury Magicians
4/16	Chamari Athapaththu	Northern Brave	Central Hinds
4/16	Hannah Darlington	Wellington Blaze	Otago Sparks

- Source: ESPNcricinfo
