= Australia women's cricket team in India in 2023–24 =

International cricket tour

| | India | Australia |
- Dates: 21 December 2023 – 9 January 2024
| Captains | Harmanpreet Kaur | Alyssa Healy |

Test series
- Result: India won the 1-match series 1–0
| Most runs | Smriti Mandhana (108) | Tahlia McGrath (123) |
| Most wickets | Sneh Rana (7) | Ashleigh Gardner (5) |

One Day International series
- Results: Australia won the 3-match series 3–0
| Most runs | Jemimah Rodrigues (151) | Phoebe Litchfield (260) |
| Most wickets | Deepti Sharma (7) | Georgia Wareham (7) |
- Player of the series: Phoebe Litchfield (Aus)

Twenty20 International series
- Results: Australia won the 3-match series 2–1
| Most runs | Smriti Mandhana (106) | Alyssa Healy (89); Beth Mooney (89) |
| Most wickets | Deepti Sharma (5) | Georgia Wareham (5) |
- Player of the series: Alyssa Healy (Aus)

The Australia women's cricket team toured India from December 2023 to January 2024 to play one Test, three One Day International (ODI) and three Twenty20 International (T20I) matches.

India won the only Test by 8 wickets, which was their first-ever win in the format against Australia.

== Squads ==
| India | | | Australia | | |
| Test | ODIs | T20Is | Test | ODIs | T20Is |
|---|---|---|---|---|---|
| Harmanpreet Kaur (c); Smriti Mandhana (vc); Yastika Bhatia (wk); Harleen Deol; Richa Ghosh (wk); Rajeshwari Gayakwad; Saika Ishaque; Jemimah Rodrigues; Deepti Sharma; Meghna Singh; Titas Sadhu; Shubha Satheesh; Renuka Singh; Sneh Rana; Pooja Vastrakar; Shafali Verma | Harmanpreet Kaur (c); Smriti Mandhana (vc); Yastika Bhatia (wk); Harleen Deol; Richa Ghosh (wk); Saika Ishaque; Mannat Kashyap; Amanjot Kaur; Shreyanka Patil; Sneh Rana; Jemimah Rodrigues; Titas Sadhu; Deepti Sharma; Renuka Singh; Pooja Vastrakar; Shafali Verma | Harmanpreet Kaur (c); Smriti Mandhana (vc); Kanika Ahuja; Yastika Bhatia (wk); Richa Ghosh (wk); Saika Ishaque; Mannat Kashyap; Amanjot Kaur; Minnu Mani; Shreyanka Patil; Jemimah Rodrigues; Titas Sadhu; Deepti Sharma; Renuka Singh; Pooja Vastrakar; Shafali Verma | Alyssa Healy (c, wk); Tahlia McGrath (vc); Darcie Brown; Lauren Cheatle; Ashleigh Gardner; Kim Garth; Heather Graham; Jess Jonassen; Alana King; Phoebe Litchfield; Beth Mooney (wk); Ellyse Perry; Megan Schutt; Annabel Sutherland; Georgia Wareham | Alyssa Healy (c, wk); Tahlia McGrath (vc); Darcie Brown; Ashleigh Gardner; Kim Garth; Heather Graham; Jess Jonassen; Alana King; Phoebe Litchfield; Beth Mooney (wk); Ellyse Perry; Megan Schutt; Annabel Sutherland; Georgia Wareham | Alyssa Healy (c, wk); Tahlia McGrath (vc); Darcie Brown; Ashleigh Gardner; Kim Garth; Heather Graham; Grace Harris; Jess Jonassen; Alana King; Phoebe Litchfield; Beth Mooney (wk); Ellyse Perry; Megan Schutt; Annabel Sutherland; Georgia Wareham |

On 14 November 2023, Cricket Australia (CA) announced the squads without naming any captain. On 8 December 2023, Alyssa Healy and Tahlia McGrath were named as captain and vice-captain respectively across all three formats.

== Only Test ==
21–24 December 2023
Scorecard

| Australia | v | India |
| 219 (77.4 overs); Tahlia McGrath 50 (56); Pooja Vastrakar 4/53 (16 overs) | | 406 (126.3 overs); Deepti Sharma 78 (171); Ashleigh Gardner 4/100 (41 overs) |
| 261 (105.4 overs); Tahlia McGrath 73 (177); Sneh Rana 4/63 (22 overs) | | 75/2 (18.4 overs); Smriti Mandhana 38* (61); Ashleigh Gardner 1/18 (9 overs) |

India won by 8 wickets
Wankhede Stadium, Mumbai
Umpires: Anil Chaudhary (Ind) and Narayanan Janani (Ind)
Player of the match: Sneh Rana (Ind)

- Australia won the toss and elected to bat.
- Richa Ghosh (Ind) and Lauren Cheatle (Aus) both made their Test debuts.
- This was India's first ever win against Australia in women's Tests.

== ODI series ==
=== 1st ODI ===
28 December 2023
13:30 (D/N)
Scorecard

| India; 282/8 (50 overs) | v | Australia; 285/4 (46.3 overs) |
| Jemimah Rodrigues 82 (77); Georgia Wareham 2/55 (9 overs) | | Phoebe Litchfield 78 (89); Renuka Singh 1/30 (7 overs) |

Australia won by 6 wickets
Wankhede Stadium, Mumbai
Umpires: Saidharshan Kumar (Ind) and Gayathri Venugopalan (Ind)
Player of the match: Phoebe Litchfield (Aus)

- India won the toss and elected to bat.
- Saika Ishaque (Ind) made her ODI debut.
- Women's Championship points: Australia 2, India 0.

=== 2nd ODI ===
30 December 2023
13:30 (D/N)
Scorecard

| Australia; 258/8 (50 overs) | v | India; 255/8 (50 overs) |
| Phoebe Litchfield 63 (98); Deepti Sharma 5/38 (10 overs) | | Richa Ghosh 96 (117); Annabel Sutherland 3/47 (9 overs) |

Australia won by 3 runs
Wankhede Stadium, Mumbai
Umpires: Vrinda Rathi (Ind) and Navdeep Singh (Ind)
Player of the match: Annabel Sutherland (Aus)

- Australia won the toss and elected to bat.
- Shreyanka Patil (Ind) made her ODI debut.
- Harleen Deol replaced Sneh Rana as a concussion substitute for India during the second innings of the match.
- Women's Championship points: Australia 2, India 0.

=== 3rd ODI ===
2 January 2024
13:30 (D/N)
Scorecard

| Australia; 338/7 (50 overs) | v | India; 148 (32.4 overs) |
| Phoebe Litchfield 119 (125); Shreyanka Patil 3/57 (10 overs) | | Smriti Mandhana 29 (29); Georgia Wareham 3/23 (6.4 overs) |

Australia won by 190 runs
Wankhede Stadium, Mumbai
Umpires: Saidharshan Kumar (Ind) and Gayathri Venugopalan (Ind)
Player of the match: Phoebe Litchfield (Aus)

- Australia won the toss and elected to bat.
- Mannat Kashyap (Ind) made her ODI debut.
- Deepti Sharma (Ind) took her 100th wicket in ODIs.
- Women's Championship points: Australia 2, India 0.

== T20I series ==
=== 1st T20I ===
5 January 2024
19:00 (N)
Scorecard

| Australia; 141 (19.2 overs) | v | India; 145/1 (17.4 overs) |
| Phoebe Litchfield 49 (32); Titas Sadhu 4/17 (4 overs) | | Shafali Verma 64* (44); Georgia Wareham 1/20 (3.4 overs) |

India won by 9 wickets
DY Patil Stadium, Navi Mumbai
Umpires: Narayanan Janani (Ind) and Vinod Seshan (Ind)
Player of the match: Titas Sadhu (Ind)

- India won the toss and elected to field.
- Smriti Mandhana (Ind) scored her 3,000th run in T20Is.

=== 2nd T20I ===
7 January 2024
19:00 (N)
Scorecard

| India; 130/8 (20 overs) | v | Australia; 133/4 (19 overs) |
| Deepti Sharma 30 (27); Georgia Wareham 2/17 (4 overs) | | Ellyse Perry 34* (21); Deepti Sharma 2/22 (4 overs) |

Australia won by 6 wickets
DY Patil Stadium, Navi Mumbai
Umpires: Madanagopal Kuppuraj (Ind) and Gayathri Venugopalan (Ind)
Player of the match: Kim Garth (Aus)

- Australia won the toss and elected to field.
- Ellyse Perry became the first cricketer from Australia to play 300 women's international matches.
- Deepti Sharma (Ind) scored her 1,000th run in T20Is.

=== 3rd T20I ===
9 January 2024
19:00 (N)
Scorecard

| India; 147/6 (20 overs) | v | Australia; 149/3 (18.4 overs) |
| Richa Ghosh 34 (28); Annabel Sutherland 2/12 (4 overs) | | Alyssa Healy 55 (38); Pooja Vastrakar 2/26 (3.4 overs) |

Australia won by 7 wickets
DY Patil Stadium, Navi Mumbai
Umpires: Vinod Seshan (Ind) and Gayathri Venugopalan (Ind)
Player of the match: Annabel Sutherland (Aus)

- Australia won the toss and elected to field.
