= Freya Kemp =

English cricketer (born 2005)

Personal information
- Full name: Freya Grace Kemp
- Born: 21 April 2005 (age 21); Westminster, Greater London, England
- Batting: Left-handed
- Bowling: Left-arm medium
- Role: All-rounder

International information
- National side: England (2022–present)
- ODI debut (cap 141): 22 September 2022 v India
- Last ODI: 16 May 2026 v New Zealand
- T20I debut (cap 56): 25 July 2022 v South Africa
- Last T20I: 5 July 2026 v Australia
- T20I shirt no.: 73

Domestic team information
- Years: Team
- 2019–2025: Sussex
- 2020: Southern Vipers
- 2021–2025: Southern Brave
- 2022–2024: Southern Vipers
- 2025–2026: Hampshire
- 2025/26–present: Perth Scorchers
- 2026: Welsh Fire

Career statistics
Competition	WODI	WT20I	WLA	WT20
Matches	8	38	40	137
Runs scored	161	336	1,283	1,641
Batting average	23.00	28.00	40.74	21.03
100s/50s	0/1	0/1	1/8	0/6
Top score	65	51*	109	60
Balls bowled	138	474	216	915
Wickets	6	30	8	49
Bowling average	22.50	20.46	22.37	23.16
5 wickets in innings	0	0	0	0
10 wickets in match	0	0	0	0
Best bowling	2/7	4/22	2/7	4/22
Catches/stumpings	1/–	7/–	15/–	38/–
Medal record
Women's cricket
Representing England
T20 World Cup
Runner-up	2026 England
- Source: CricketArchive, 6 July 2026

Freya Grace Kemp (born 21 April 2005) is an English cricketer who currently plays for Sussex and Welsh Fire. An all-rounder, she plays as a left-arm medium bowler and left-handed batter. She made her international debut for the England women's cricket team in July 2022. At the end of the 2022 season, Kemp was voted the PCA Women's Young Player of the Year.

== Early life ==
Kemp was born on 21 April 2005 in Westminster, Greater London. She attended Bede's School.

== Domestic career ==
Kemp made her county debut in 2019, for Sussex against Nottinghamshire in the Women's Twenty20 Cup, in which she took 1/12 from 2 overs. She played four matches overall for the side in the competition. She next played for the side in the 2022 Women's Twenty20 Cup, scoring 131 runs and taking 4 wickets in 6 appearances. In the group semi-final, she made her maiden Twenty20 half-century against Surrey, scoring 53* from 27 deliveries.

Kemp was named in the Southern Vipers squad for the 2020 Rachael Heyhoe Flint Trophy, but did not play a match for the side that season. She was moved to the side's Academy squad for the 2021 season. She was also included in the Southern Brave squad for the 2021 season of The Hundred, but did not play a match. She was again included in the Southern Brave squad for the 2022 season, as well as returning to the Southern Vipers squad. She made her debut for Southern Vipers on 14 May 2022, against North West Thunder in the Charlotte Edwards Cup, where she took 2/13 from her 4 overs. She went on to take 9 wickets for the Vipers in the Charlotte Edwards Cup, at an average of 17.66. She also played two matches for the side in the Rachael Heyhoe Flint Trophy, scoring 46 runs and taking one wicket. In The Hundred, she played all eight matches for Southern Brave, scoring 75 runs and taking one wicket. At the end of the 2022 season, Kemp was voted the PCA Women's Young Player of the Year, primarily for her performances for Southern Vipers and England.

In 2023, she played 15 matches for Southern Vipers, across the Rachael Heyhoe Flint Trophy and the Charlotte Edwards Cup, including scoring 211 runs at an average of 30.14 in the Rachael Heyhoe Flint Trophy. She also played nine matches for Southern Brave in The Hundred, with a top score of 41*. In 2024, she played 14 matches for Southern Vipers, across the Rachael Heyhoe Flint Trophy and the Charlotte Edwards Cup, scoring two half-centuries.

She joined Hampshire Women's team ahead of the restructured domestic set-up for the 2025 season.

== International career ==
In July 2022, she was named in England's squad for their T20I series against South Africa and for the cricket tournament at the 2022 Commonwealth Games in Birmingham, England. Kemp made her WT20I debut on 25 July 2022, during England's home series against South Africa, taking 2/18 from her three overs. She went on to be England's leading wicket-taker at the Commonwealth Games, taking six wickets in five matches, including taking 2/14 against Sri Lanka. Later that summer, in England's series against India, Kemp scored her maiden international half-century, scoring 51* in a T20I at Derby, becoming the youngest woman to make a T20I fifty for England in the process. She made her One Day International debut on 21 September 2022 during the same series, bowling her 10 overs for 82 runs, the most ever for an English bowler in WODIs. She played two matches overall in the ODI series, taking three wickets. In November 2022, Kemp was awarded with her first England central contract. In December 2022, Kemp went on England's tour of the West Indies, but was ruled out of the series, and the 2023 ICC Women's T20 World Cup, after suffering a stress fracture in her back. She returned to play for England for their September 2023 series against Sri Lanka, whilst also playing on England's tour of India in December 2023. She was named in the England squad for the 2024 ICC Women's T20 World Cup. Kemp was named in England's travelling party for their multi-format tour to South Africa in November 2024, including her first inclusion in a Test match squad. She played in all three T20I matches before being withdrawn from the remainder of the tour to allow her to rest her before the 2025 Women's Ashes. Kemp was named in the England squad for the T20I part of the 2025 Women's Ashes series in Australia.
