= India women's cricket team in England in 2021 =

International cricket tour

	England women	India women
- Dates: 16 June – 14 July 2021
Captains	Heather Knight	Mithali Raj (WTest & WODIs); Harmanpreet Kaur (WT20Is)

Test series
- Result: 1-match series drawn 0–0
Most runs	Heather Knight (95)	Shafali Verma (159)
Most wickets	Sophie Ecclestone (8)	Sneh Rana (4)

One Day International series
- Results: England women won the 3-match series 2–1
Most runs	Nat Sciver (142)	Mithali Raj (206)
Most wickets	Sophie Ecclestone (8)	Jhulan Goswami (3); Poonam Yadav (3); Deepti Sharma (3)
- Player of the series: Sophie Ecclestone (Eng)

Twenty20 International series
- Results: England women won the 3-match series 2–1
Most runs	Danni Wyatt (123)	Smriti Mandhana (119)
Most wickets	Nat Sciver (3); Sophie Ecclestone (3); Katherine Brunt (3)	Shikha Pandey (3); Poonam Yadav (3)
- Player of the series: Nat Sciver (Eng)

Series points
- England women 10, India women 6

The India women's cricket team toured England to play the England women's cricket team in June and July 2021. On International Women's Day 2021, Jay Shah, the secretary of the Board of Control for Cricket in India (BCCI), stated that the India team would play a one-off Women's Test match against the England team. India women last played a Test match in November 2014, against South Africa. In April 2021, the England and Wales Cricket Board (ECB) confirmed the fixtures for the tour, including the one-off Test match, three Women's One Day International (WODI) and three Women's Twenty20 International (WT20I) matches.

A points-based system was used across all three formats of the tour, with four points for winning the Test match, two points if the Test was drawn, and two points for each win in the limited overs matches.

The one-off Test match ended in a draw, despite England making a big first-innings lead and enforcing the follow-on. England won the first WODI by eight wickets to record their 100th win at home in the format. England then won the second WODI match by five wickets, to win the series with a game to spare. India won the final WODI by four wickets, with England taking the series 2–1. England won the first WT20I, with India winning the second match. Therefore, England took an 8–6 lead in the points-based system into the final match of the tour. England won the third WT20I by eight wickets, to win the WT20I series 2–1 and to win 10–6 in the points-based system.

During the third WODI match, India's Mithali Raj became the leading run-scorer in women's international cricket. She went past Charlotte Edwards' previous record of 10,273 runs.

== Background ==
Originally, the tour was scheduled to take place in June and July 2020. The tour was to consist of four WODIs and two WT20Is. However, on 24 April 2020, due to the COVID-19 pandemic, the ECB confirmed that no professional cricket would be played in England before 1 July 2020, with the tour being postponed. In May 2020, Clare Connor, the Director of Cricket for the ECB, suggested that India could take part in a tri-series with the touring South African team during September 2020. However, on 20 July 2020, reports stated that India would not tour, due to the impact of the pandemic in India.

The Test match was played on a used pitch from a men's game in the 2021 t20 Blast from the previous week. The ECB later apologised for the situation.

== Squads ==
WTest		WODIs		WT20Is	
England	India	England	India	England	India
Heather Knight (c); Nat Sciver (vc); Emily Arlott; Tammy Beaumont; Katherine Brunt; Kate Cross; Sophia Dunkley; Sophie Ecclestone; Georgia Elwiss; Tash Farrant; Amy Jones (wk); Anya Shrubsole; Mady Villiers; Fran Wilson; Lauren Winfield-Hill	Mithali Raj (c); Harmanpreet Kaur (vc); Taniya Bhatia (wk); Ekta Bisht; Jhulan Goswami; Smriti Mandhana; Shikha Pandey; Priya Punia; Sneh Rana; Punam Raut; Jemimah Rodrigues; Arundhati Reddy; Indrani Roy (wk); Deepti Sharma; Pooja Vastrakar; Shafali Verma; Poonam Yadav; Radha Yadav	Heather Knight (c); Nat Sciver (vc); Emily Arlott; Tammy Beaumont; Katherine Brunt; Kate Cross; Freya Davies; Sophia Dunkley; Sophie Ecclestone; Tash Farrant; Sarah Glenn; Amy Jones (wk); Anya Shrubsole; Mady Villiers; Fran Wilson; Lauren Winfield-Hill	Mithali Raj (c); Harmanpreet Kaur (vc); Taniya Bhatia (wk); Ekta Bisht; Jhulan Goswami; Smriti Mandhana; Shikha Pandey; Priya Punia; Sneh Rana; Punam Raut; Jemimah Rodrigues; Arundhati Reddy; Indrani Roy (wk); Deepti Sharma; Pooja Vastrakar; Shafali Verma; Poonam Yadav; Radha Yadav	Heather Knight (c); Nat Sciver (vc); Tammy Beaumont; Katherine Brunt; Freya Davies; Sophia Dunkley; Sophie Ecclestone; Tash Farrant; Sarah Glenn; Amy Jones (wk); Anya Shrubsole; Mady Villiers; Fran Wilson; Danni Wyatt	Harmanpreet Kaur (c); Smriti Mandhana (vc); Simran Bahadur; Taniya Bhatia (wk); Ekta Bisht; Harleen Deol; Richa Ghosh; Shikha Pandey; Sneh Rana; Arundhati Reddy; Jemimah Rodrigues; Indrani Roy (wk); Deepti Sharma; Pooja Vastrakar; Shafali Verma; Poonam Yadav; Radha Yadav

On 9 June 2021, England named a squad of 17 players for the one-off Test match. Two days later, Freya Davies and Sarah Glenn were released from the squad allowing them to play in the 2021 Rachael Heyhoe Flint Trophy ahead of England's one-day matches.

== Only WTest ==
16–19 June 2021
Scorecard

England	v	India
396/9d (121.2 overs); Heather Knight 95 (175); Sneh Rana 4/131 (39.2 overs)		231 (81.2 overs); Shafali Verma 96 (152); Sophie Ecclestone 4/88 (26 overs)
		344/8 (121 overs) (f/o); Sneh Rana 80* (154); Sophie Ecclestone 4/118 (38 overs)

Match drawn
Bristol County Ground, Bristol
Umpires: Sue Redfern (Eng) and Chris Watts (Eng)
Player of the match: Shafali Verma (Ind)

- England Women won the toss and elected to bat.
- No play was possible after tea on day 3 due to rain.
- Sophia Dunkley (Eng), Taniya Bhatia, Sneh Rana, Deepti Sharma, Pooja Vastrakar and Shafali Verma (Ind) all made their Test debuts.
- Heather Knight played her 100th match as the captain of England Women.
- Points: England Women 2, India Women 2.

== WODI series ==
=== 1st WODI ===
27 June 2021
10:30
Scorecard

India; 201/8 (50 overs)	v	England; 202/2 (34.5 overs)
Mithali Raj 72 (108); Sophie Ecclestone 3/40 (10 overs)		Tammy Beaumont 87* (87); Jhulan Goswami 1/25 (6 overs)

England Women won by 8 wickets
Bristol County Ground, Bristol
Umpires: Graham Lloyd (Eng) and Sue Redfern (Eng)
Player of the match: Tammy Beaumont (Eng)

- England Women won the toss and elected to field.
- Sophia Dunkley (Eng) and Shafali Verma (Ind) both made their WODI debuts.
- Points: England Women 2, India Women 0.

=== 2nd WODI ===
30 June 2021
14:00 (D/N)
Scorecard

India; 221 (50 overs)	v	England; 225/5 (47.3 overs)
Mithali Raj 59 (92); Kate Cross 5/34 (10 overs)		Sophia Dunkley 73* (81); Poonam Yadav 2/63 (10 overs)

England Women won by 5 wickets
County Ground, Taunton
Umpires: Nigel Llong (Eng) and Russell Warren (Eng)
Player of the match: Kate Cross (Eng)

- England Women won the toss and elected to field.
- Nat Sciver (Eng) took her 50th wicket in WODIs.
- Points: England Women 2, India Women 0.

=== 3rd WODI ===
3 July 2021
10:30
Scorecard

England; 219 (47 overs)	v	India; 220/6 (46.3 overs)
Nat Sciver 49 (59); Deepti Sharma 3/47 (10 overs)		Mithali Raj 75* (86); Sophie Ecclestone 2/36 (10 overs)

India Women won by 4 wickets
New Road, Worcester
Umpires: Nigel Llong (Eng) and Russell Warren (Eng)
Player of the match: Mithali Raj (Ind)

- India Women won the toss and elected to field.
- The match was reduced to 47 overs per side due to rain.
- Heather Knight (Eng) scored her 3,000th run and took her 50th wicket in WODIs.
- Points: India Women 2, England Women 0.

== WT20I series ==
=== 1st WT20I ===
9 July 2021
18:30 (D/N)
Scorecard

England; 177/7 (20 overs)	v	India; 54/3 (8.4 overs)
Nat Sciver 55 (27); Shikha Pandey 3/22 (4 overs)		Smriti Mandhana 29 (17); Sarah Glenn 1/6 (1.4 overs)

England Women won by 18 runs (DLS method)
County Cricket Ground, Northampton
Umpires: Ian Blackwell (Eng) and Sue Redfern (Eng)
Player of the match: Nat Sciver (Eng)

- India Women won the toss and elected to field.
- India Women were set a revised target of 73 runs from 8.4 overs due to rain.
- Points: England Women 2, India Women 0.

=== 2nd WT20I ===
11 July 2021
14:30
Scorecard

India; 148/4 (20 overs)	v	England; 140/8 (20 overs)
Shafali Verma 48 (38); Mady Villiers 1/9 (2 overs)		Tammy Beaumont 59 (50); Poonam Yadav 2/17 (4 overs)

India Women won by 8 runs
County Cricket Ground, Hove
Umpires: Ian Blackwell (Eng) and Paul Baldwin (Eng)
Player of the match: Deepti Sharma (Ind)

- England Women won the toss and elected to field.
- Points: India Women 2, England Women 0.

=== 3rd WT20I ===
14 July 2021
18:30 (D/N)
Scorecard

India; 153/6 (20 overs)	v	England; 154/2 (18.4 overs)
Smriti Mandhana 70 (51); Sophie Ecclestone 3/35 (4 overs)		Danni Wyatt 89* (56); Sneh Rana 1/27 (3 overs)

England Women won by 8 wickets
County Cricket Ground, Chelmsford
Umpires: Sue Redfern (Eng) and Tim Robinson (Eng)
Player of the match: Danni Wyatt (Eng)

- India Women won the toss and elected to bat.
- Points: England Women 2, India Women 0.
