= Indrani Roy =

Indian cricketer

Personal information
- Full name: Indrani Roy
- Born: 5 September 1997 (age 29)
- Batting: Right-handed
- Bowling: Right-arm medium
- Role: Wicket-keeper

International information
- National side: India

Domestic team information
- Years: Team
- 2018–present: Jharkhand
- 2023–present: Royal Challengers Bangalore
- Source: ESPNcricinfo, 14 May 2021

Indrani Roy (born 5 September 1997) is an Indian cricketer. She plays for the Jharkhand women's cricket team in domestic tournaments in India.

Roy started playing cricket at the age of 15, and cites MS Dhoni as her idol. She played for the Bengal under-19 team for four years, before signing with Jharkhand in 2014. In 2018, Roy played for the India Blue cricket team, and a year later, also for India C. In the 2019–20 Women's Senior One Day Trophy, Roy scored her first century, an unbeaten 132 runs, in a one-day match. Her match-winning century helped Jharkhand to reach the knock-out phase of the tournament, before the competition was cancelled due to the COVID-19 pandemic. In the 2020–21 season, Roy scored two unbeaten centuries in the Senior Women's One Day League. Roy finished the season as the leading run-scorer in the tournament, with 456 runs in eight matches.

In May 2021, Roy earned her maiden call-up to the India women's cricket team, for their tour of England. She was named in India's squad for the one-off Test match, and the squads for the Women's One Day International (WODI) and Women's Twenty20 International (WT20I) matches. However, Roy did not play during the series, and expressed her disappointment on not being selected for India's tour of Australia in September and October 2021.
