= Mannat Kashyap =

Indian cricketer

Personal information
- Full name: Mannat Sanjeev Kashyap
- Born: 15 December 2003 (age 22); Patiala, Punjab, India
- Batting: Right-handed
- Bowling: Left-arm slow orthodox
- Role: All-rounder

International information
- National side: India (2024–present)
- Only ODI (cap 142): 2 January 2024 v Australia

Domestic team information
- Years: Team
- 2024–present: Gujarat Giants
- 2024: North Zone
Medal record
Women's Cricket
Representing India
ICC Under-19 Women’s T20 World Cup
Winner	2023 South Africa
- Source: ESPNcricinfo, 17 March 2024

Mannat Kashyap (born 15 December 2003) is an Indian cricketer who currently plays for Gujarat Giants. She plays as a left-arm off break bowler. She was part of the India team that won the inaugural Under-19 Women's T20 World Cup.

== International career ==
In November 2022, she was selected to the India women's under-19 team for a five-match T20 series against the New Zealand women's under-19 team.

In December 2022, she was selected to the under-19 team for the 2023 Under-19 Women's T20 World Cup. She took 9 wickets, with her best bowling figure being 4/12 and was named Player of the Match against Scotland.

In December 2023, she was named in India's T20I squad for the series against England. In the same month she was named in the ODI squad for the series against Australia. She made her One Day International (ODI) debut against Australia on 2 January 2024.

== Domestic career ==
In December 2023, she was signed by Gujarat Giants at the Women's Premier League auction, for the 2024 season.
