= Saika Ishaque =

Indian cricketer

Personal information
- Full name: Saika Ishaque
- Born: 8 October 1995 (age 31); Calcutta (now Kolkata), West Bengal, India
- Batting: Left-handed
- Bowling: Slow left-arm orthodox
- Role: Bowler

International information
- National side: India (2023–present)
- Only ODI (cap 140): 28 December 2023 v Australia
- T20I debut (cap 79): 6 December 2023 v England
- Last T20I: 10 December 2023 v England

Domestic team information
- Years: Team
- 2011/12–present: Bengal
- 2023–present: Mumbai Indians

Career statistics
Competition	WFC	WLA	WT20
Matches	15	53	60
Runs scored	126	220	124
Batting average	9.69	8.14	6.52
100s/50s	0/0	0/0	0/0
Top score	26	35	22*
Balls bowled	1,691	2,593	1,193
Wickets	23	60	52
Bowling average	29.51	20.38	19.53
5 wickets in innings	0	1	0
10 wickets in match	0	0	0
Best bowling	4/49	5/30	4/6
Catches/stumpings	5/–	11/–	12/–
- Source: CricketArchive, 3 December 2023

Saika Ishaque (born 8 October 1995) is an Indian cricketer who currently plays for Bengal and Mumbai Indians. She plays as a slow left-arm orthodox bowler and left-handed batter.

== Domestic career ==
Ishaque made her debut for Bengal Women in 2013 and has been a regular member of the team since then. In October 2022, she represented Bengal in the Women's Senior T20 Trophy. The following month, she played in the Women's T20 Challenger Trophy, where she was part of the India A team.

In the inaugural Women's Premier League auction in February 2023, Ishaque was purchased by Mumbai Indians for 10 lakhs.

In her debut season for Mumbai Indians, Ishaque emerged as one of the top performers in the tournament, taking 9 wickets in 8 matches at an economy rate of 5.80. She played a key role in Mumbai Indians' journey to the final, which they won against Delhi Capitals to become the inaugural WPL champions. She was the second-highest wicket-taker in the tournament.

== International career ==
In December 2023, Ishaque got her maiden international call up for India on her selection for the England and Australia series. She made her Twenty20 International T20I debut against England on 6 December 2023.

In December 2023, Ishaque was selected in India's ODI and T20I series against Australia. In May 2024, she was named in India's Test squad for the series against South Africa.

== Personal life ==
Ishaque grew up in a slum in Kolkata and started playing cricket at a young age. Her father, who died when she was just 12 years old, was a big inspiration for her and she dedicated her performance in the Women's T20 Challenge to him.
