= South Africa women's cricket team in India in 2023 =

International cricket tour

	India	South Africa
- Date: September 2023

One Day International series

Twenty20 International series

The South Africa women's cricket team are scheduled to tour India in September 2023 to play the India women's cricket team. The tour will consist of three Women's One Day International (WODI) and Women's Twenty20 International (WT20I) matches. The WODI series will form part of the 2022–2025 ICC Women's Championship.
