= Craig Pryor =

New Zealand cricketer (born 1973)

Personal information
- Full name: Craig Robert Pryor
- Born: 15 October 1973 (age 53); Auckland, New Zealand
- Batting: Left-handed
- Bowling: Right-arm medium
- Role: Umpire

Domestic team information
- Years: Team
- 1997/98–1998/99: Auckland
- 2000/01–2001/02: Otago
- 2001/02–2003/04: Auckland

Umpiring information
- WT20Is umpired: 1 (2024)
- Source: ESPNcricinfo, 21 May 2016

Craig Pryor (born 15 October 1973) is a New Zealand former cricketer. He played first-class and List A matches for Auckland and Otago between the 1997–98 and 2003–04 seasons.

Pryor was born at Auckland in 1973 and educated at Auckland Grammar School. He is descended from the Ngāti Awa and Ngāti Pikiao iwis. He played for Auckland age-group teams from the 1991–92 season and for the Second XI from 1992–93. In the same season he played three matches for the New Zealand under-19 team, one Youth Test match and two Your One Day Internationals, all against Australia under-19s. He made his full Auckland debut in January 1998. After playing for two seasons for Otago he returned to Auckland in 2001–02.

In total, Pryor played in 36 first-class and 37 List A matches. He scored 990 first-class runs and took 96 wickets. In List A cricket he scored 750 runs and took 23 wickets. Since retiring from cricket he has worked in the motor vehicle trade. As of 2023 he was a member of the Board of Directors of Auckland cricket.
