= Shubha Satheesh =

Indian cricketer

Personal information
- Full name: Shubha Satheesh
- Born: 13 July 1999 (age 27); Bangalore, Karnataka, India
- Batting: Left-handed
- Bowling: Right-arm medium
- Role: All-rounder

International information
- National side: India (2023 - present)
- Test debut (cap 92): 14 December 2023 v England
- Last Test: 28 June 2024 v South Africa

Domestic team information
- Years: Team
- 2012/13–2022/23: Karnataka
- 2023/24–present: Railways

Career statistics
Competition	WTest	WFC	WLA	WT20
Matches	1	3	52	41
Runs scored	69	90	1,275	665
Batting average	69.00	18.00	28.97	20.78
100s/50s	0/1	0/1	0/10	0/3
Top score	69	69	85	61*
Balls bowled	–	–	296	72
Wickets	–	–	7	3
Bowling average	–	–	27.71	21.00
5 wickets in innings	–	–	0	0
10 wickets in match	–	–	0	0
Best bowling	–	–	2/11	2/24
Catches/stumpings	0/–	2/–	22/–	22/–
- Source: CricketArchive, 18 December 2023

Shubha Satheesh (born 13 July 1999) is an Indian cricketer who currently plays for Railways and Royal Challengers Bangalore. She plays as a left-handed batter and right-arm medium bowler. She has previously played for Karnataka.

She made her international debut in December 2023, in a Test match for India against England.

== Early life ==
Shubha was born on 13 July 1999 in Bangalore.

== Domestic career ==
Shubha made her debut for Karnataka in November 2012, against Andhra. She scored her maiden Twenty20 half-century in January 2017, with 61* against Saurashtra, and her maiden List A half-century in December 2018, with 72 against Tamil Nadu. She was the fourth-highest run-scorer in the 2020–21 Women's Senior One Day Trophy, with 346 runs including four half-centuries. She moved to Railways ahead of the 2023–24 season.

She played two matches for South Zone in the 2017–18 Senior Women's Cricket Inter Zonal Three Day Game tournament.

In December 2023, she was signed by Royal Challengers Bangalore for the second season of the Women's Premier League.

== International career ==
In December 2023, Shubha earned her first call-up to the India squad for the side's Test matches against England and Australia. She made her international debut in the Test match against England, scoring 69 in the first innings. That has been her only Test, as she was ruled out of the Test match against Australia due to injury.
