= Amy Jones (cricketer) =

English cricketer (born 1993)

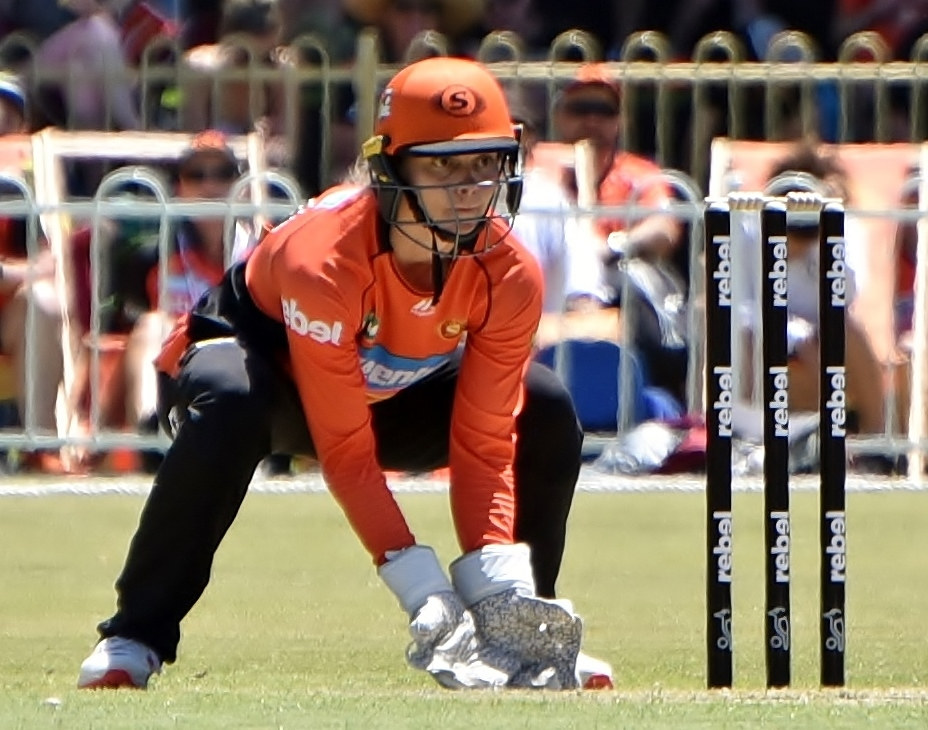
- Jones during WBBL|04, 2018

Personal information
- Full name: Amy Ellen Jones
- Born: 13 June 1993 (age 33); Solihull, West Midlands, England
- Batting: Right-handed
- Role: Wicket-keeper

International information
- National side: England (2013–present)
- Test debut (cap 160): 18 July 2019 v Australia
- Last Test: 10 July 2026 v India
- ODI debut (cap 121): 1 February 2013 v Sri Lanka
- Last ODI: 30 May 2025 v West Indies
- ODI shirt no.: 40
- T20I debut (cap 33): 5 July 2013 v Pakistan
- Last T20I: 26 May 2025 v West Indies
- T20I shirt no.: 40

Domestic team information
- Years: Team
- 2008–2024: Warwickshire
- 2016–2019: Loughborough Lightning
- 2016/17–2017/18: Sydney Sixers
- 2017/18: Western Australia
- 2018/19–2020/21: Perth Scorchers
- 2020–2024: Central Sparks
- 2021–present: Birmingham Phoenix
- 2022/23: Sydney Thunder
- 2023/24–2024/25: Perth Scorchers
- 2023/24: Western Australia (squad no. Melbourne Stars)
- 2025–present: The Blaze
- 2025/26: Melbourne Stars

Career statistics
Competition	WTest	WODI	WT20I	WLA
Matches	9	111	125	207
Runs scored	294	2689	1859	5,490
Batting average	19.6	32.82	20.31	33.47
100s/50s	0/3	2/16	0/7	8/30
Top score	64	129	89	163*
Catches/stumpings	23/0	93/23	59/44	159/80
Medal record
Women's cricket
Representing England
T20 World Cup
Runner-up	2026 England
- Source: Cricinfo, 29 January 2026

Amy Ellen Jones is an English cricketer who plays as a wicket-keeper and right-handed batter for The Blaze, London Spirit , Melbourne Stars (WBBL) and England. She made her England debut in 2013 and is a holder of an ECB central contract.

On 8 September 2022, England's captain Nat Sciver announced that she decided to withdraw from their home white ball series against India "to focus on her mental health and well being". In her absence, Jones was named as England's captain for the WT20I and WODI series.

== Early life and career ==
Jones was born in Solihull, West Midlands, and raised in nearby Sutton Coldfield, where she attended John Willmott School. Her first experience of organised sport was playing on a boys' football team for Aston Villa; she then joined Walmley Cricket Club and rose rapidly through the ranks. She has since commented:

"Some of my mates played cricket at the local club and I went down there. They had a girls' team and a successful ladies' team which wasn't common at the time. So, I was lucky and it was quite straightforward. They had good links with Warwickshire and I had a trial at Edgbaston at 13 and I went on from there."

While still in her mid-teens, Jones represented the Warwickshire Academy and began to be selected for England Development and Academy programmes. In 2011, when she was 18, she was called up to the England Women's Academy at Loughborough University. By then, she was an accomplished wicket-keeper, and had already had her keeping assessed on occasional training sessions at the academy. Soon after her callup, she was informed she was to become a full-time member of the academy and deputy to then regular England team wicket-keeper Sarah Taylor.

== Career ==
Jones was the holder of one of the first tranche of 18 ECB central contracts for women players, which were announced in April 2014. In April 2015, Jones was named as one of the England women's Academy squad tour to Dubai, where England women played their Australian counterparts in two 50-over games, and two Twenty20 matches. A member of the 2015 Women's Ashes squad, she played in the one-day matches but was replaced in the squad by Fran Wilson.

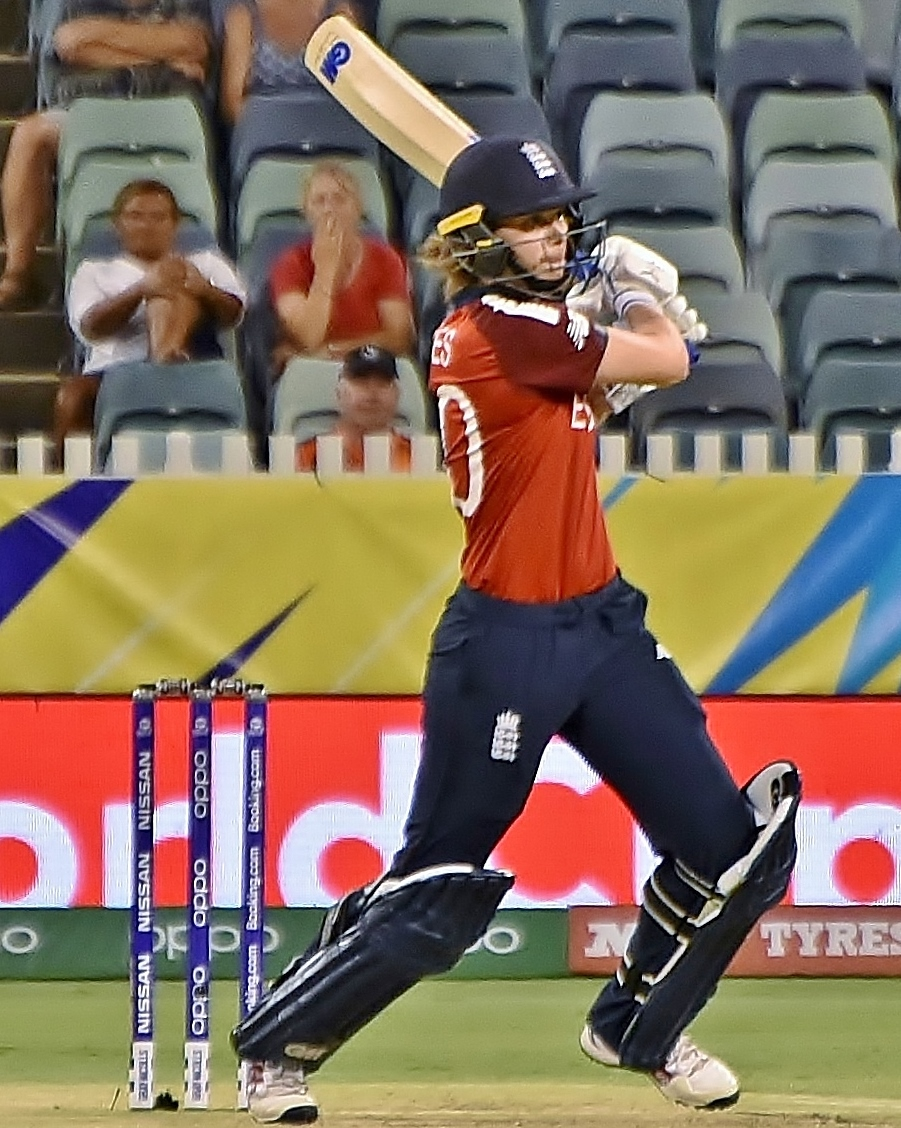
Jones batting for England during the 2020 ICC Women's T20 World Cup

In October 2018, she was named in England's squad for the 2018 ICC Women's World Twenty20 tournament in the West Indies. In November 2018, she was named in the Perth Scorchers' squad for the 2018–19 Women's Big Bash League season.

In February 2019, she was awarded a full central contract by the England and Wales Cricket Board (ECB) for 2019.

In June 2019, the ECB named her in England's squad for their opening match against Australia to contest the Women's Ashes. The following month, she was also named in England's Test squad for the one-off match against Australia. She made her Test debut for England against Australia women on 18 July 2019.

Upon the retirement of Sarah Taylor in late 2019, Jones became the first choice wicket-keeper for the England team. By then, she had already kept wicket in 42 of her 80 England matches across all formats. In January 2020, she was named in England's squad for the 2020 ICC Women's T20 World Cup in Australia.

On 18 June 2020, Jones was named in a squad of 24 players to begin training ahead of international women's fixtures starting in England following the COVID-19 pandemic. She featured in all five matches, making a match best score of 55 in the fourth T20I.

In June 2021, Jones was named in England's Test squad for their one-off match against India. In December 2021, Jones was named in England's squad for their tour to Australia to contest the Women's Ashes. In February 2022, she was named in England's team for the 2022 Women's Cricket World Cup in New Zealand where they finished runners up after losing to Australia.

In April 2022, she was bought by the Birmingham Phoenix for the 2022 season of The Hundred. In June 2022, she was named the 2022 Charlotte Edwards Cup Player of the Year by the PCA, scoring 289 runs in 8 games for Central Sparks, the most across the entire competition. In July 2022, she was named in England's team for the cricket tournament at the 2022 Commonwealth Games in Birmingham, England.

In September 2022, due to the absence of captain Heather Knight and vice captain Nat Sciver, Jones was made captain of England for their home white ball series against India.

She was named in the England squad for the 2024 ICC Women's T20 World Cup. In November 2024, Jones joined The Blaze for the 2025 domestic season. Later that month she was named in the England squad for their tour of South Africa.

Jones was named in the England squad for the 2025 Women's Ashes series in Australia.

She made her maiden international century in the first of a three match ODI series against the West Indies at the County Cricket Ground, Derby, on 30 May 2025, scoring 122. Five days later she hit 129 off 98 balls in the second match of the series at Grace Road, Leicester, as she and Tammy Beaumont became the first opening pair - women's or men's - to score back-to-back hundreds in ODI history.

== Personal life ==
Jones is in a relationship with Piepa Cleary, a seam bowler from Australia who plays for the Perth Scorchers. In 2021, after the relationship had been a long-distance one for some years, Cleary relocated to England and started playing for North West Thunder. Jones and Cleary are now both based in Loughborough, Leicestershire. On 23 July 2024, the couple announced their engagement. They got married on 4 April 2026.

== Honours ==
- Walter Lawrence Women's Award winner: 2021
