= Sarah Glenn =

English cricketer (born 1999)

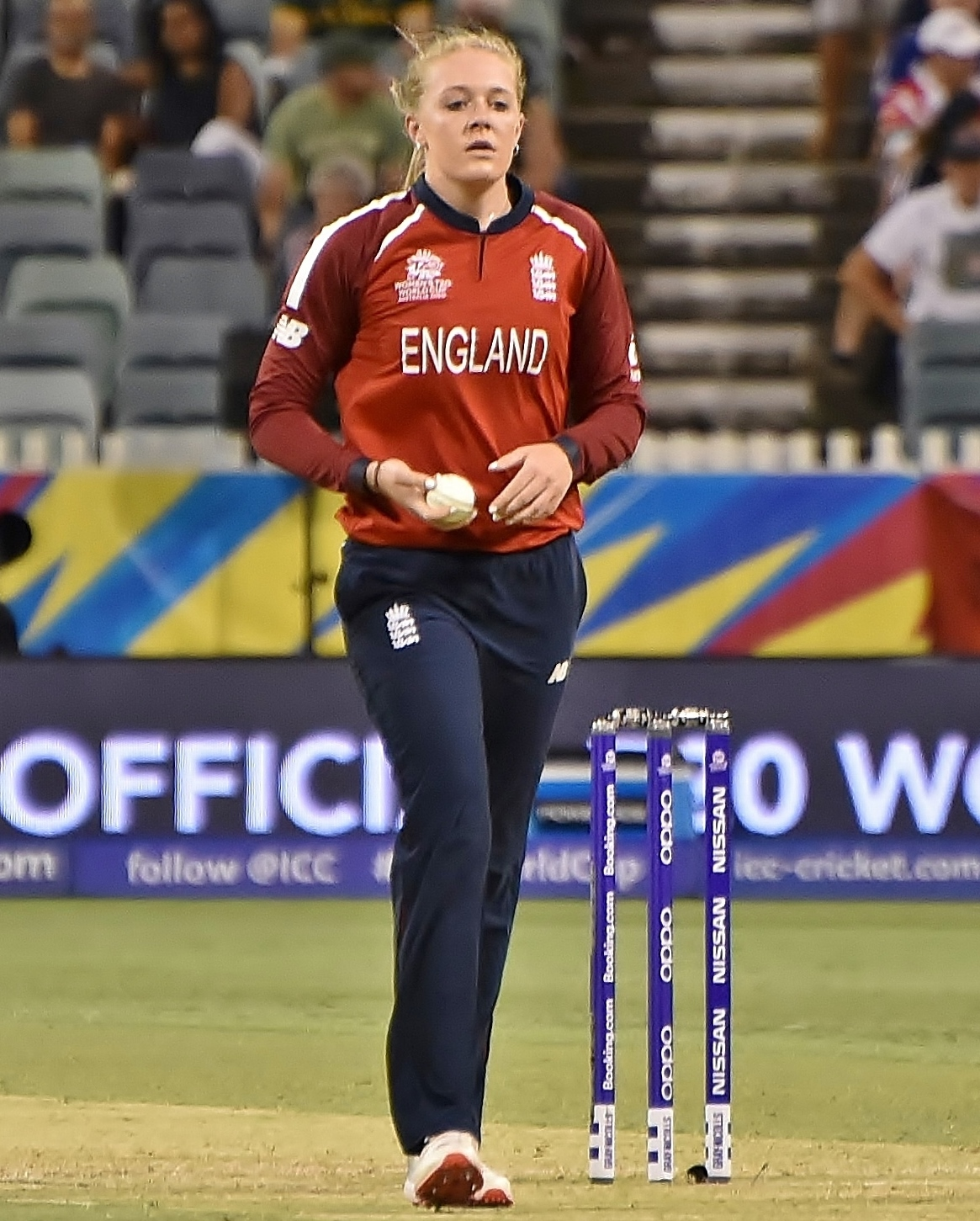
- Glenn playing for England during the 2020 ICC Women's T20 World Cup

Personal information
- Born: 27 August 1999 (age 27); Derby, Derbyshire, England
- Batting: Right-handed
- Bowling: Right-arm leg break
- Role: Bowler

International information
- National side: England (2019–present)
- ODI debut (cap 133): 9 December 2019 v Pakistan
- Last ODI: 15 October 2025 v Pakistan
- T20I debut (cap 50): 17 December 2019 v Pakistan
- Last T20I: 26 May 2025 v West Indies
- T20I shirt no.: 3

Domestic team information
- Years: Team
- 2013–2018: Derbyshire
- 2017–2019: Loughborough Lightning
- 2018–2022: Worcestershire
- 2020–2022: Central Sparks
- 2020/21: Perth Scorchers
- 2021–2022: Trent Rockets
- 2023–2025: The Blaze
- 2023–2025: London Spirit
- 2023/24–present: Brisbane Heat
- 2026–present: Yorkshire
- 2026–present: London Spirit

Career statistics
Competition	WODI	WT20I	WLA	WT20
Matches	19	73	77	240
Runs scored	68	134	1,021	1,110
Batting average	17.00	16.75	23.20	13.05
100s/50s	0/0	0/0	0/5	0/0
Top score	22*	26	72	43*
Balls bowled	757	1,454	3,280	4,487
Wickets	23	89	102	254
Bowling average	23.78	16.48	20.71	18.14
5 wickets in innings	0	0	0	0
10 wickets in match	0	0	0	0
Best bowling	4/18	4/12	4/17	4/12
Catches/stumpings	4/–	12/–	23/–	49/–
- Source: CricketArchive, 30 July 2026

Sarah Glenn (born 27 August 1999) is an English cricketer who plays for the England women's cricket team as a leg break bowler. She also plays for Yorkshire, Southern Brave and Brisbane Heat. After making her England debut in 2019, she played in the 2020 ICC Women's T20 World Cup and broke into the top 10 of the ICC T20I Bowling Rankings later that year. In September 2022, she rose to second in the Women's Twenty20 International (WT20I) bowling rankings.

== Early life ==
Glenn was born on 27 August 1999 in Derby. She was home-schooled for much of her early education, and later attended Trent College, where she played boys' first XI cricket. Her sister, Hannah, played cricket for Derbyshire between 2008 and 2011, whilst her uncle Michael played for Derbyshire CCC in 1975 and 1976. Glenn played hockey at junior international level, and currently plays for Belper Hockey Club.

== Domestic career ==
Glenn made her debut for Derbyshire in 2013, in a Women's County Championship match against Gloucestershire. She bowled four overs for 22 runs and did not bat. Glenn became a regular for Derbyshire in the Women's Twenty20 Cup over the next few seasons, and was selected for the England Development Programme Under-15s competition in 2015, in which she took 7 wickets in two games, including taking 5/8 against Junior Rubies.

After further appearances for Derbyshire and the England Academy, Glenn was selected for the regional team Loughborough Lightning for the 2017 Women's Cricket Super League. She bowled five overs in the season and went for just 13 runs at an economy of 2.60, as well as taking 4 wickets at an average of 3.25. She also scored 58 runs at an average of 19.33, opening the batting in two matches. Glenn moved to Worcestershire ahead of the 2018 Women's Twenty20 Cup, taking three wickets in her first tournament with her new side. Glenn appeared for Loughborough Lightning again in 2018, taking three wickets with an economy of 6.87. 2019 was her breakthrough year, however, as she took 11 wickets at an average of 18.72, with an economy of 6.05: the joint-fifth best return for a spin bowler in the competition. Her performances in the KSL lead to her international selection in December 2019.

Glenn played two matches for Central Sparks in the new Rachael Heyhoe Flint Trophy in 2020, taking one wicket. She was signed by Perth Scorchers for the 2020–21 Women's Big Bash, in which she took 17 wickets with an economy of 6.25, ending the tournament as her side's leading wicket-taker, and joint-sixth across the tournament. In 2021, she was drafted by Trent Rockets for the inaugural season of The Hundred. In April 2022, she was bought by the Trent Rockets for the 2022 season of The Hundred. In November 2022, it was announced that Glenn had re-joined Derbyshire from Worcestershire. In February 2023, it was announced that Glenn had joined The Blaze from Central Sparks. In 2025 Glenn announced she was joining Yorkshire in their debut year at Tier 1 level.

== International career ==
In November 2019, she was named in England's squads for their series against Pakistan in Malaysia. She made her Women's One Day International (WODI) debut for England, against Pakistan, on 9 December 2019, in which she took two wickets, including the winning wicket. She took 8 wickets in the three-game series, including 4/18 in the 3rd ODI. She made her Women's Twenty20 International (WT20I) debut for England, also against Pakistan, on 17 December 2019, taking one wicket. At the conclusion of the two series, she was singled out for special praise by her captain, Heather Knight, who said that "[s]he definitely deserved to be player of the series in the ODIs."

Glenn was selected for the 2020 Australia women's Tri-Nation Series in January and February, and took five wickets in three matches, the joint-highest for England.

In January 2020, Glenn was named in England's squad for the 2020 ICC Women's T20 World Cup in Australia. England reached the semi-finals of the tournament, with Glenn taking 6 wickets, with an economy of 4.25. Glenn took 3–15 in England's group stage victory over Pakistan.

On 18 June 2020, she was named in a squad of 24 players to begin training ahead of international women's fixtures starting in England following the COVID-19 pandemic. In September, she played against the West Indies in 5 T20Is, in which she named Player of the Series. Glenn took 7 wickets in the series, as well as contributing a "valuable" 26 off 19 balls with the bat in the 2nd T20I, as England won 5–0. After the series, she moved up to ninth in the ICC T20I Bowling Rankings.

In 2021, Glenn was named in the squad for England's tour of New Zealand. Glenn played all six matches on the tour, and was the joint-leading wicket-taker in the three match T20I series. In June 2021, Glenn was named as in England's Test squad for their one-off match against India. However, she was later released from the squad, allowing her to play in the 2021 Rachael Heyhoe Flint Trophy ahead of England's one-day matches.

In December 2021, Glenn was named in England's squad for their tour to Australia to contest the Women's Ashes. In July 2022, she was named in England's team for the cricket tournament at the 2022 Commonwealth Games in Birmingham, England.

In September 2022, she moved to second position in the ICC women's T20I bowling rankings, her career best rank, after taking a four wicket haul against India.

She was named in the England squad for the 2024 ICC Women's T20 World Cup and their multi-format tour to South Africa in November 2024.

Glenn was named in the England squad for the 2025 Women's Ashes series in Australia.
