= 2020 Women's T20 Challenge =

Cricket tournament

- Dates: 4 – 9 November 2020
- Administrator: BCCI
- Cricket format: Twenty20
- Tournament format(s): Round-robin and final
- Host: United Arab Emirates
- Champions: Trailblazers (1st title)
- Runners-up: Supernovas
- Participants: 3
- Matches: 4
- Player of the series: (India) Radha Yadav (Supernovas)
- Most runs: (Sri Lanka) Chamari Athapaththu (Supernovas) (117)
- Most wickets: (India) Radha Yadav (Supernovas) (8)

Teams
- Supernovas; Trailblazers; Velocity

The 2020 Women's T20 Challenge, branded as the Jio Women's T20 Challenge, was the third season of the Women's T20 Challenge, a Twenty20 cricket tournament established by the Board of Control for Cricket in India (BCCI) in 2018. Like the previous edition, it featured three teams and consisted of a group stage of three matches followed by a final.

The tournament was originally scheduled to be held in May 2020 at the Sawai Mansingh Stadium in Jaipur, coinciding with the IPL playoffs. However, it was postponed along with the IPL due to the COVID-19 pandemic.

The tournament was eventually held from 4 to 9 November 2020 at the Sharjah Cricket Stadium in the United Arab Emirates, again coinciding with the IPL playoffs. Trailblazers defeated Supernovas by 16 runs in the final to win their maiden title.

The season was watched by 105 million unique viewers in India, an increase of 47% compared to the previous season. It recorded 5.34 billion viewing minutes, representing a 2.45-fold growth over the 2019 edition.

== Squads ==
On 11 October 2020, BCCI announced squads and schedule for Women's T20 Challenge.

IPL Supernovas	IPL Trailblazers	IPL Velocity
(India) Harmanpreet Kaur (c); (India) Jemimah Rodrigues (vc); (Sri Lanka) Chamari Atapattu; (India) Priya Punia; (India) Anuja Patil; (India) Radha Yadav; (India) Taniya Bhatia (wk); (Sri Lanka) Shashikala Siriwardene; (India) Poonam Yadav; (Barbados) Shakera Selman; (India) Arundhati Reddy; (India) Pooja Vastrakar; (India) Ayushi Soni; (South Africa) Ayabonga Khaka; (India) Muskan Malik	(India) Smriti Mandhana (c); (India) Deepti Sharma (vc); (India) Punam Raut; (India) Richa Ghosh; (India) Dayalan Hemalatha; (India) Nuzhat Parween (wk); (India) Rajeshwari Gayakwad; (India) Harleen Deol; (India) Jhulan Goswami; (India) Simran Bahadur; (Bangladesh) Salma Khatun; (England) Sophie Ecclestone; (Thailand) Natthakan Chantam; (Barbados) Deandra Dottin; (India) Kashvee Gautam	(India) Mithali Raj (c); (India) Veda Krishnamurthy (vc); (India) Shafali Verma; (India) Sushma Verma (wk); (India) Ekta Bisht; ~~(India) Mansi Joshi~~; (India) Shikha Pandey; (India) Devika Vaidya; (India) Sushree Dibyadarshini; (India) Manali Dakshini; (New Zealand) Leigh Kasperek; (England) Danni Wyatt; (South Africa) Suné Luus; (Bangladesh) Jahanara Alam; (India) Murali Anagha; (India) Meghna Singh

Natthakan Chantam became the first Thai cricketer to be represented in this tournament. Overseas players Sophie Devine, Suzie Bates, Nat Sciver, Stafanie Taylor, Amelia Kerr, Lea Tahuhu and Hayley Matthews were not part of the 2020 edition, due to the fixture clash with the 2020–21 Women's Big Bash League season in Australia. Mansi Joshi was ruled out of Women's T20 Challenge due to testing positive for COVID-19. Meghna Singh was named as her replacement in Velocity squad.

== Points table ==
Pos	Team	Pld	W	L	NR	Pts	NRR
1	IPL Trailblazers	2	1	1	0	2	2.109
2	IPL Supernovas	2	1	1	0	2	−0.054
3	IPL Velocity	2	1	1	0	2	−1.869

Advanced to final

== Round-robin ==
4 November 2020
19:30 IST (D/N)
Scorecard

IPL Supernovas; 126/8 (20 overs)	v	IPL Velocity; 129/5 (19.5 overs)
Chamari Atapattu 44 (39); Ekta Bisht 3/22 (4 overs)		Suné Luus 37* (21); Ayabonga Khaka 2/27 (4 overs)

IPL Velocity won by 5 wickets
Sharjah Cricket Stadium, Sharjah
Umpires: Yeshwant Barde and Ulhas Gandhe
Player of the match: Suné Luus (IPL Velocity)

- IPL Velocity won the toss and elected to bowl.

5 November 2020
15:30 IST
Scorecard

IPL Velocity; 47 (15.1 overs)	v	IPL Trailblazers; 49/1 (7.5 overs)
Shafali Verma 13 (9); Sophie Ecclestone 4/9 (3.1 overs)		Deandra Dottin 29* (28); Leigh Kasperek 1/5 (2 overs)

IPL Trailblazers won by 9 wickets
Sharjah Cricket Stadium, Sharjah
Umpires: Pashchim Pathak and Krishnamachari Srinivasan
Player of the match: Sophie Ecclestone (IPL Trailblazers)

- IPL Velocity won the toss and elected to bat.

7 November 2020
19:30 IST (D/N)
Scorecard

IPL Supernovas; 146/6 (20 overs)	v	IPL Trailblazers; 144/5 (20 overs)
Chamari Atapattu 67 (48); Jhulan Goswami 1/17 (4 overs)		Deepti Sharma 43* (40); Radha Yadav 2/30 (4 overs)

IPL Supernovas won by 2 runs
Sharjah Cricket Stadium, Sharjah
Umpires: Yeshwant Barde and Anil Dandekar
Player of the match: Chamari Atapattu (IPL Supernovas)

- IPL Supernovas won the toss and elected to bat.

== Final ==
9 November 2020
19:30 IST (D/N)
Scorecard

IPL Trailblazers; 118/8 (20 overs)	v	IPL Supernovas; 102/7 (20 overs)
Smriti Mandhana 68 (49); Radha Yadav 5/16 (4 overs)		Harmanpreet Kaur 30 (36); Salma Khatun 3/18 (4 overs)

IPL Trailblazers won by 16 runs
Sharjah Cricket Stadium, Sharjah
Umpires: Yeshwant Barde and Ulhas Gandhe
Player of the match: Smriti Mandhana (IPL Trailblazers)

- IPL Supernovas won the toss and elected to field.
- IPL Trailblazers won the 2020 Women's T20 Challenge.
