= 2022 Women's T20 Challenge =

Cricket tournament

- Logo of the 2022 Women's T20 Challenge
- Dates: 23 May 2022 – 28 May 2022
- Administrator: BCCI
- Cricket format: Twenty20
- Tournament format(s): Round-robin and final
- Host: India
- Champions: Supernovas (Women's T20 Challenge) (3rd title)
- Runners-up: Velocity (Women's T20 Challenge)
- Participants: 3
- Matches: 4
- Player of the series: (Cricket West Indies) Deandra Dottin (Supernovas)
- Most runs: (India) Harmanpreet Kaur (Supernovas) (151)
- Most wickets: (India) Pooja Vastrakar (Supernovas) (6)
- Official website: Official site

- Location of Maharashtra Cricket Association Stadium in Pune

Teams
- Supernovas; Trailblazers; Velocity

The 2022 Women's T20 Challenge, also known as the My11Circle Women's T20 Challenge for sponsorship reasons, was the fourth and final season of the Women's T20 Challenge, a Twenty20 tournament established by the Board of Control for Cricket in India (BCCI) in 2018. Similar to the previous edition, it featured three teams and consisted of a group stage of three matches followed by a final. In the final, Supernovas (Women's T20 Challenge) defeated Velocity (Women's T20 Challenge) by four runs to win their third title. The tournament was subsequently replaced by the Women's Premier League.

== Venue ==
The tournament was held from 23 May to 28 May, with all the matches played at Maharashtra Cricket Association Stadium, Pune.

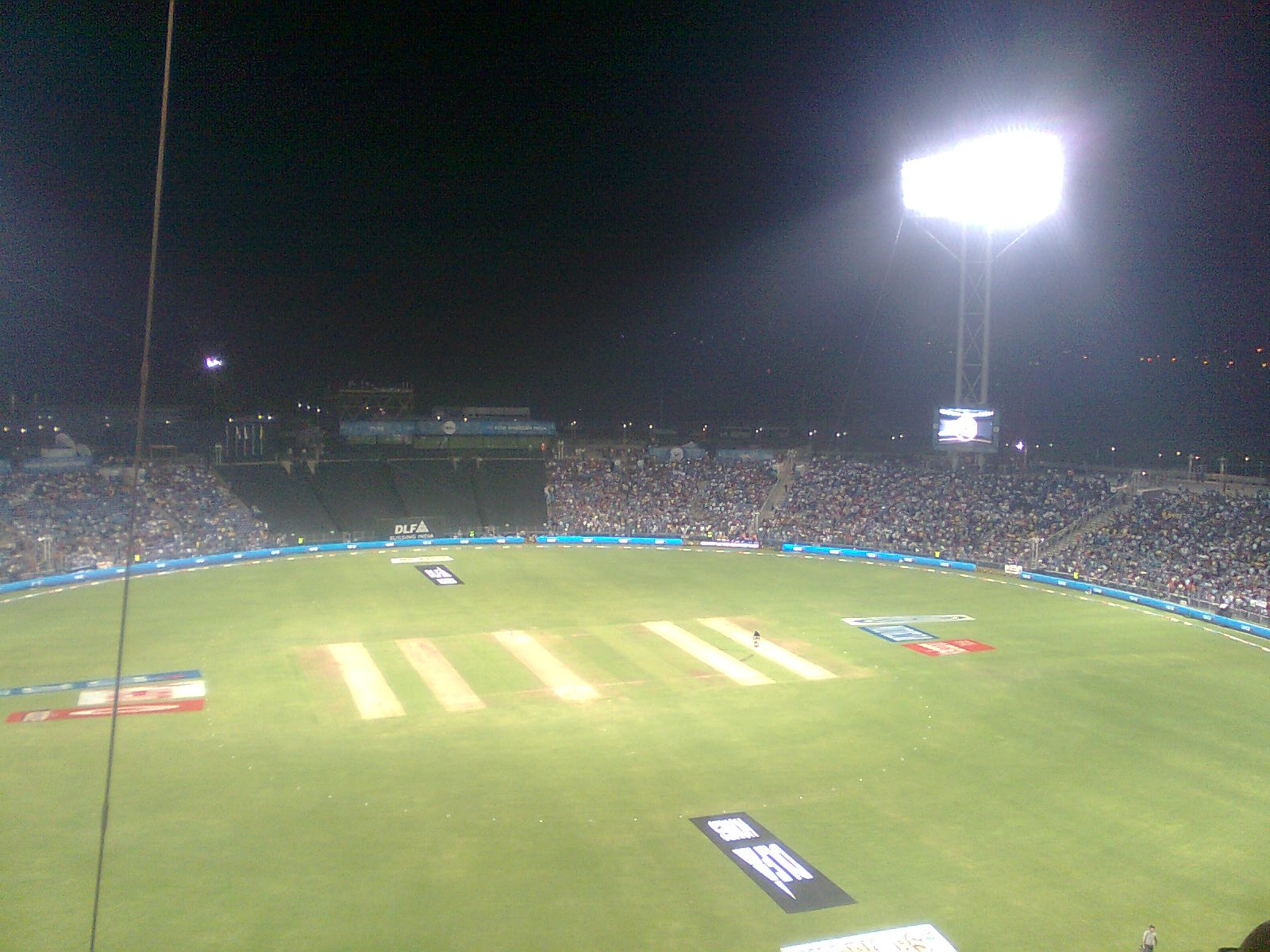
Maharashtra Cricket Association Stadium

== Squads ==
The squads were announced on 16 May 2022.

Supernovas	Trailblazers	Velocity
(India) Harmanpreet Kaur (c); (Australia) Alana King; (India) Ayushi Soni; (India) Chandu Venkateshappa; (Cricket West Indies) Deandra Dottin; (India) Harleen Deol; (India) Mansi Joshi; (India) Meghna Singh; (India) Monica Patel; (India) Muskan Malik; (India) Pooja Vastrakar; (India) Priya Punia; (India) Rashi Kanojiya; (England) Sophie Ecclestone; (South Africa) Suné Luus; (India) Taniya Bhatia	(India) Smriti Mandhana (c); (India) Arundhati Reddy; (Cricket West Indies) Hayley Matthews; (India) Jemimah Rodrigues; (India) Poonam Yadav; (India) Priyanka Priyadarshini; (India) Rajeshwari Gayakwad; (India) Renuka Singh; (India) Richa Ghosh; (India) Sabbhineni Meghana; (India) Saiqa Ishaque; (Bangladesh) Salma Khatun; (Bangladesh) Sharmin Akhter; (India) Shradda Pokharkar; (England) Sophia Dunkley; (India) Sujata Mallik	(India) Sneh Rana (c); (India) Aarti Kedar; (South Africa) Ayabonga Khaka; (England) Kate Cross; (India) Keerthi James; (India) Kiran Navgire; (South Africa) Laura Wolvaardt; (India) Maya Sonawane; (Thailand) Natthakan Chantam; (India) Pranavi Chandra; (India) Radha Yadav; (India) Shafali Verma; (India) Shivali Shinde; (India) Simran Bahadur; (India) Deepti Sharma; (India) Yastika Bhatia

== Points table ==
Pos	Team	Pld	W	L	NR	Pts	NRR
1	Supernovas	2	1	1	0	2	0.912
2	Velocity	2	1	1	0	2	−0.022
3	Trailblazers	2	1	1	0	2	−0.825

Source: ESPNcricinfo

Advanced to final

== Round-robin ==
23 May 2022
19:30 (D/N)
Scorecard

Supernovas; 163 (20 overs)	v	Trailblazers; 114/9 (20 overs)
Harmanpreet Kaur 37 (29); Hayley Matthews 3/29 (4 overs)		Smriti Mandhana 34 (23); Pooja Vastrakar 4/12 (4 overs)

Supernovas won by 49 runs
Maharashtra Cricket Association Stadium, Pune
Umpires: Narayanan Janani (Ind) and Vrinda Rathi (Ind)
Player of the match: Pooja Vastrakar (Supernovas)

- Supernovas won the toss and elected to bat.

24 May 2022
15:30
Scorecard

Supernovas; 150/5 (20 overs)	v	Velocity; 151/3 (18.2 overs)
Harmanpreet Kaur 71 (51); Kate Cross 2/24 (4 overs)		Shafali Verma 51 (33); Deandra Dottin 2/21 (3.2 overs)

Velocity won by 7 wickets
Maharashtra Cricket Association Stadium, Pune
Umpires: Narayanan Janani (Ind) and Gayathri Venugopalan (Ind)
Player of the match: Harmanpreet Kaur (Supernovas)

- Velocity won the toss and elected to bowl.

26 May 2022
19:30 (D/N)
Scorecard

Trailblazers; 190/5 (20 overs)	v	Velocity; 174/9 (20 overs)
Sabbhineni Meghana 73 (47); Simran Bahadur 2/31 (3 overs)		Kiran Navgire 69 (34); Poonam Yadav 2/33 (4 overs)

Trailblazers won by 16 runs
Maharashtra Cricket Association Stadium, Pune
Umpires: Vrinda Rathi (Ind) and Gayathri Venugopalan (Ind)
Player of the match: Jemimah Rodrigues (Trailblazers)

- Velocity won the toss and elected to field.

== Final ==
28 May 2022
19:30 (D/N)
Scorecard

Supernovas; 165/7 (20 overs)	v	Velocity; 161/8 (20 overs)
Deandra Dottin 62 (44); Deepti Sharma 2/20 (4 overs)		Laura Wolvaardt 65* (40); Alana King 3/32 (4 overs)

Supernovas won by 4 runs
Maharashtra Cricket Association Stadium, Pune
Umpires: Narayanan Janani (Ind) and Vrinda Rathi (Ind)
Player of the match: Deandra Dottin (IPL Supernovas)

- Velocity won the toss and elected to field.

== See also ==
- India women's national cricket team
