= Sushree Dibyadarshini =

Indian cricketer

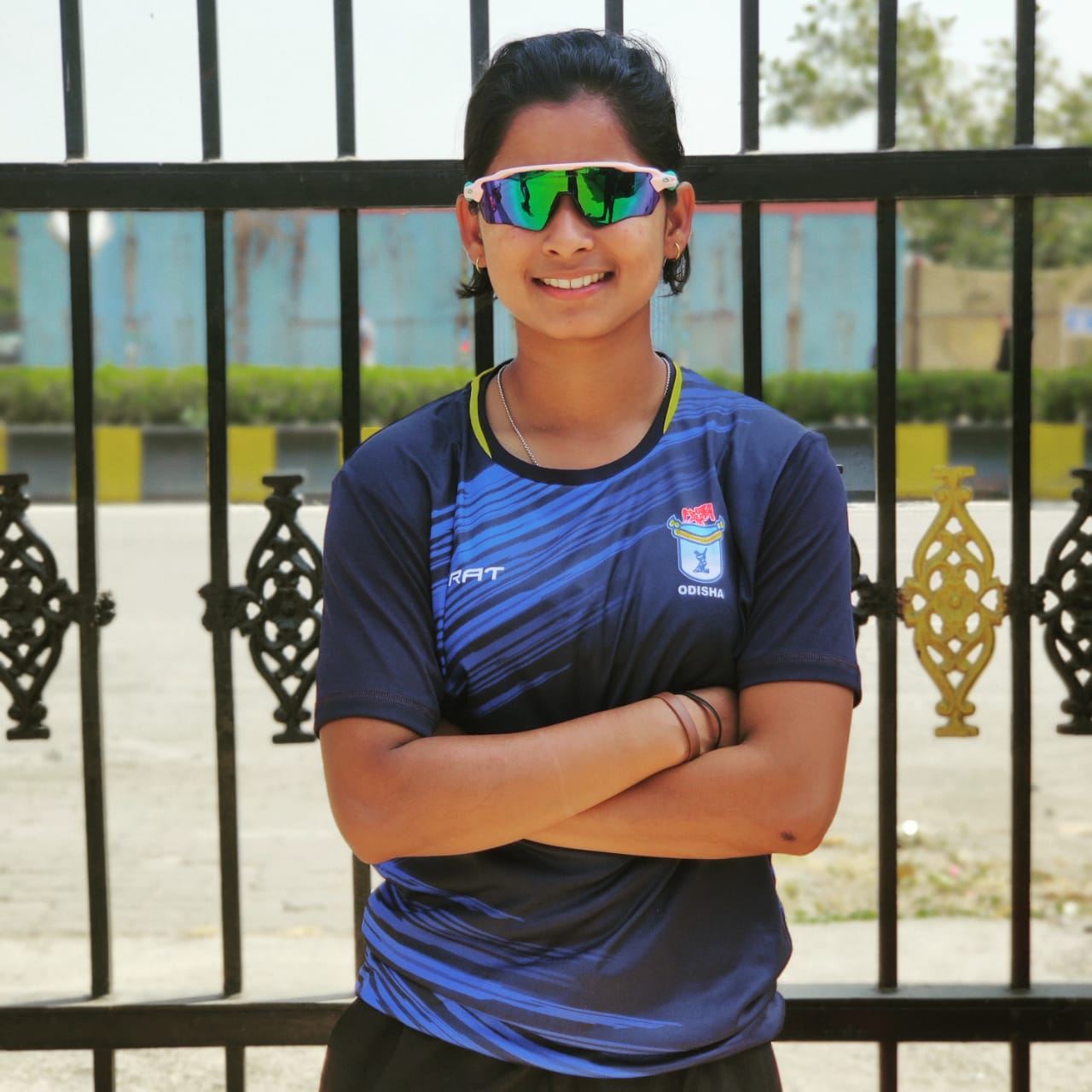

Personal information
- Full name: Sushree Dibyadarshini Pradhan
- Born: 8 September 1997 (age 29); Dhenkanal, Orissa, India
- Batting: Right-handed
- Bowling: Right-arm off break

Domestic team information
- Years: Team
- 2012/13–present: Odisha
- 2013/14–present: East Zone
- 2019–2020/21: Velocity

Career statistics
Competition	WFC	WLA	WT20
Matches	11	87	69
Runs scored	247	1376	387
Batting average	22.45	25.48	11.05
100s/50s	0/1	0/7	0/0
Top score	57	74*	43*
Balls bowled	1,242	3,748	1,221
Wickets	24	114	70
Bowling average	19.41	19.85	16.11
5 wickets in innings	0	1	0
10 wickets in match	0	–	–
Best bowling	4/45	5/43	4/19
Catches/stumpings	8/–	29/–	19/–
- Source: CricketArchive, 4 March 2021

Sushree Dibyadarshini Pradhan (born 8 September 1997) is an Indian cricketer who plays for Odisha. She is a right-arm off break bowler and lower-order batter. She captained the India Green team in the Under-23 Women's Challenger Trophy, where her team reached the final of the tournament.

In 2019, she was selected to play for Velocity in the Women's T20 Challenge. She also captains Odisha Women's U-23 team in domestic Indian cricket competitions. She represented India in ACC Women' Emerging Teams Asia Cup 2019, where she was the highest wicket taker for India.

== Personal life ==
Sushree Dibyadarshini was born in Dhenkanal, Odisha. When she was seven years old, she started playing cricket for fun in her residential colony. When she turned 15, she began training under club coach Khirod Behera who continues to coach her as of 2021. Pradhan started representing her home state Odisha in group zonal tournaments.

Apart from cricket, watching popular cinema and acting are her favorite hobbies. She made her acting debut in the Tamil-language sports drama film titled Kanaa, which centers around cricket.

== Career ==
Sushree Dibyadarshini has been representing her home state Odisha since 2012. She now also captains Odisha women's U23 team in limited overs cricket tournaments.

After playing for Odisha Under-19s in the 2011/12 and 2012/13 seasons, she made her full debut in 2012 against Assam, in which she scored 9 runs and took one wicket. Dibyadarshini went on to become a regular member of Odisha's team, and began playing for India A in 2014. Her best bowling of 5/43 came in March 2020, against Haryana. She has also played for East Zone and India Green.

She also played for India in the ACC Women's Emerging Teams Asia Cup in 2019.

Dibyadarshini was selected as part of the Velocity squad ahead of the 2019 Women's T20 Challenge, and played one match, dismissing West Indian batter Stafanie Taylor. She was retained in the Velocity squad for the 2020 competition, and again appeared in one game.

== Filmography ==
=== Film ===
Year	Title	Role	Notes
2018	Kanaa	Deepika Patel	
