= 2018 Women's T20 Challenge =

Cricket tournament

Trailblazers	Supernovas
129/6	130/7
20 overs	20 overs
- Supernovas won by 3 wickets
- Date: 22 May 2018
- Venue: Wankhede Stadium, Mumbai
- Player of the match: (New Zealand) Suzie Bates (Trailblazers)
- Umpires: (India) Ulhas Gandhe (India) Rohan Pandit

2018 Indian Premier League
- 2019

The 2018 Women's T20 Challenge was the inaugural edition of the Women's T20 Challenge, a women's Twenty20 cricket match which took place on 22 May 2018 at the Wankhede Stadium, Mumbai. In an effort to popularise women's cricket, the BCCI organised the match ahead of Qualifier 1 of the 2018 IPL. The exhibition match was also held by the BCCI as a rehearsal for a future Women's IPL tournament. Supernovas won the match by 3 wickets in a last-over thriller.

== Squads ==
Trailblazers	Supernovas
(India) Smriti Mandhana (c)	(India) Harmanpreet Kaur (c)
(Australia) Alyssa Healy (wk)	(India) Taniya Bhatia (wk)
(New Zealand) Suzie Bates	(England) Danielle Wyatt
(India) Deepti Sharma	(India) Mithali Raj
(Australia) Beth Mooney	(Australia) Meg Lanning
(India) Jemimah Rodrigues	(New Zealand) Sophie Devine
(England) Danielle Hazell	(Australia) Ellyse Perry
(India) Shikha Pandey	(India) Veda Krishnamurthy
(New Zealand) Lea Tahuhu	(India) Mona Meshram
(India) Jhulan Goswami	(India) Pooja Vastrakar
(India) Ekta Bisht	(Australia) Megan Schutt
(India) Poonam Yadav	(India) Rajeshwari Gayakwad
(India) Dayalan Hemalatha	(India) Anuja Patil

== Scorecard ==
22 May 2018
Scorecard

Trailblazers; 129/6 (20 overs)	v	Supernovas; 130/7 (20 overs)
Suzie Bates 32 (37); Megan Schutt 2/18 (4 overs)		Danielle Wyatt 24 (20); Suzie Bates 2/16 (3 overs)

Supernovas won by 3 wickets
Wankhede Stadium, Mumbai
Umpires: Ulhas Gandhe and Rohan Pandit
Player of the match: Suzie Bates (Trailblazers)

- Supernovas won the toss and elected to field.

== See also ==
- 2018 Indian Premier League
- Women's Big Bash League
