= Manali Dakshini =

Indian cricketer (born 1997)

Personal information
- Full name: Manali Kishor Dakshini
- Born: 29 September 1997 (age 29); Thane, Maharashtra, India
- Batting: Right-handed
- Bowling: Right-arm medium

Domestic team information
- Years: Team
- 2016–present: Mumbai
- 2020: Velocity
- Source: ESPNcricinfo, 8 January 2020

Manali Kishor Dakshini (born 29 September 1997) is a Maharashtrian cricketer. She is a right-arm medium pacer and right-hand batter. She plays for Mumbai and West Zone. She has played 3 first-class matches, 11 limited over matches and 21 Women's Twenty20. In January 2019, she was named in India Blue's team for the 2018–19 Senior Women's Challenger Trophy. She was one of the top performers of Challengers Trophy held in January 2019, with a remarkable all-round performance. Manali was selected for the Velocity squad for the 2020 Women's T20 Challenge.
