= Devika Palshikar =

Indian cricketer (born 1979)

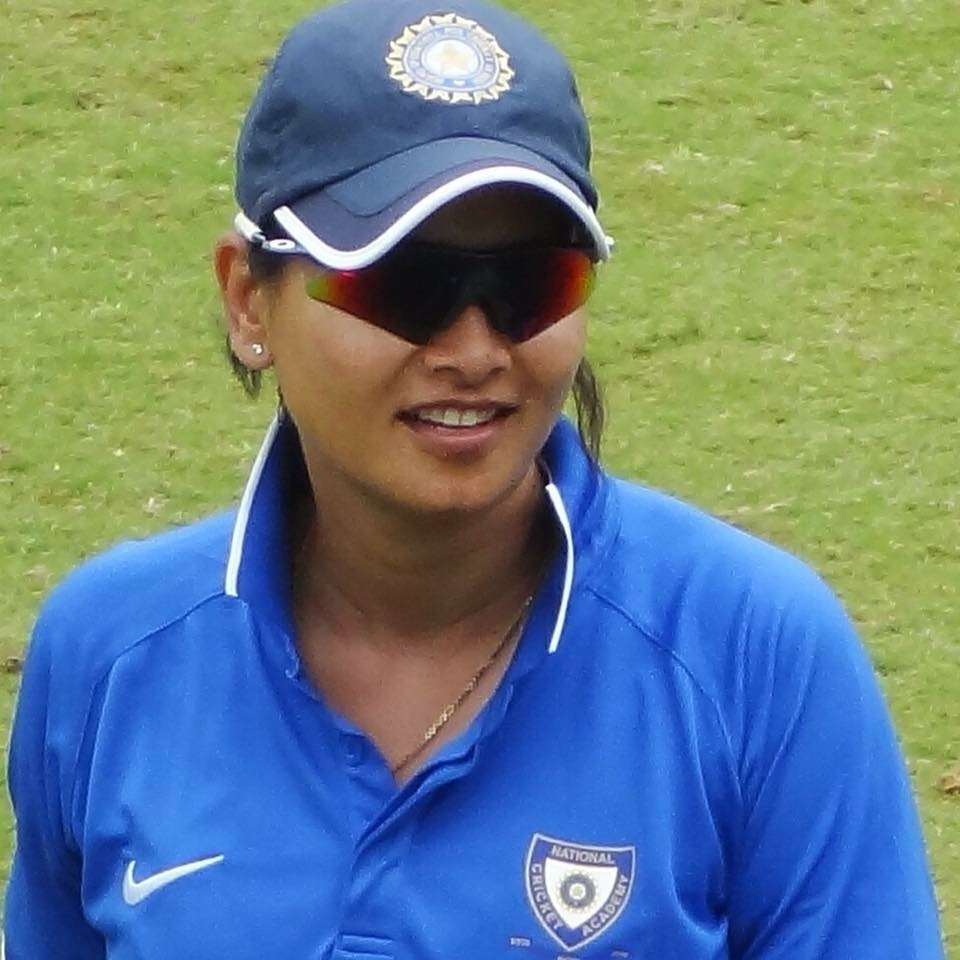

Personal information
- Full name: Devika Palshikar
- Born: 20 June 1979 (age 47); Malvan, Maharashtra, India
- Batting: Right-handed
- Bowling: Right-arm leg break
- Role: All-rounder

International information
- National side: India (2006–2008)
- Only Test (cap 69): 18 February 2006 v Australia
- ODI debut (cap 80): 2 January 2006 v Pakistan
- Last ODI: 9 September 2008 v England

Domestic team information
- Years: Team
- 2002/03–2004/05: Air India
- 2006/07–2008/09: Maharashtra

Career statistics
Competition	WTest	WODI	WFC	WLA
Matches	1	15	14	55
Runs scored	7	66	402	785
Batting average	3.50	13.20	28.71	25.32
100s/50s	0/0	0/0	1/2	0/6
Top score	6	22*	115	86
Balls bowled	54	366	1,796	1,741
Wickets	0	12	42	62
Bowling average	–	18.00	13.28	18.37
5 wickets in innings	0	0	3	1
10 wickets in match	0	0	0	0
Best bowling	–	3/12	6/52	6/8
Catches/stumpings	0/–	4/–	8/–	16/–
- Source: CricketArchive, 30 August 2022

Devika Palshikar (Devanagari: देविका पळशीकर; born 20 June 1979) is an Indian former cricketer and current cricket coach. She played as a right-handed batter and right-arm leg break bowler. She appeared in one Test match and 15 One Day Internationals for India between 2006 and 2008. She played domestic cricket for Air India and Maharashtra.

After retiring as a player, Palshikar was assistant coach of India between 2014 and 2016, and assistant coach of Bangladesh in 2018. She has also coached various Indian domestic teams, and was head coach of Velocity for the 2022 Women's T20 Challenge.
