= 2019 Women's T20 Challenge =

Cricket tournament

- Dates: 6 – 11 May 2019
- Administrator: BCCI
- Cricket format: Twenty20
- Tournament format(s): Round-robin and final
- Host: India
- Champions: Supernovas (2nd title)
- Runners-up: Velocity
- Participants: 3
- Matches: 4
- Player of the series: (India) Jemimah Rodrigues (Supernovas)
- Most runs: (India) Jemimah Rodrigues (Supernovas) (123)
- Most wickets: (New Zealand) Amelia Kerr (Velocity) (6)

Teams
- Supernovas; Trailblazers; Velocity

The 2019 Women's T20 Challenge was the second season of the Women's T20 Challenge, a Twenty20 cricket tournament established by the Board of Control for Cricket in India (BCCI) in 2018.

Unlike the previous year, the 2019 edition featured three teams instead of a one-off match, with a new side called Velocity joining the tournament. It was held from 6 to 11 May 2019 at the Sawai Mansingh Stadium in Jaipur, coinciding with the 2019 IPL playoffs. Supernovas won their second title by defeating Velocity in the final by four wickets.

The season attracted 71 million unique viewers in India and recorded 2.20 billion minutes of total viewership.

== Squads ==
Supernovas	Trailblazers	Velocity
(India) Harmanpreet Kaur (c); (India) Anuja Patil; (India) Arundhati Reddy; (Sri Lanka) Chamari Athapaththu; (India) Jemimah Rodrigues; (New Zealand) Lea Tahuhu; (India) Mansi Joshi; (England) Natalie Sciver; (India) Poonam Yadav; (India) Priya Punia; (India) Radha Yadav; (New Zealand) Sophie Devine; (India) Taniya Bhatia	(India) Smriti Mandhana (c); (India) Bharati Fulmali; (India) Dayalan Hemalatha; (India) Deepti Sharma; (India) Harleen Deol; (India) Jasia Akhtar; (India) Jhulan Goswami; (India) Ravi Kalpana; (India) Rajeshwari Gayakwad; (Barbados) Shakera Selman; (England) Sophie Ecclestone; (Jamaica) Stafanie Taylor; (New Zealand) Suzie Bates	(India) Mithali Raj (c); (New Zealand) Amelia Kerr; (England) Danielle Wyatt; (India) Devika Vaidya; (India) Ekta Bisht; (Barbados) Hayley Matthews; (Bangladesh) Jahanara Alam; (India) Komal Zanzad; (India) Shafali Verma; (India) Shikha Pandey; (India) Sushma Verma; (India) Sushree Dibyadarshini; (India) Veda Krishnamurthy

== Points table ==
Pos	Team	Pld	W	L	NR	Pts	NRR
1	Supernovas	2	1	1	0	2	0.250
2	Velocity	2	1	1	0	2	0.045
3	Trailblazers	2	1	1	0	2	−0.305

Advanced to final

== Round-robin ==
6 May 2019
19:30 (D/N)
Scorecard

Trailblazers; 140/5 (20 overs)	v	Supernovas; 138/6 (20 overs)
Smriti Mandhana 90 (67); Radha Yadav 2/28 (4 overs)		Harmanpreet Kaur 46* (34); Sophie Ecclestone 2/11 (4 overs)

Trailblazers won by 2 runs
Sawai Mansingh Stadium, Jaipur
Umpires: Nitin Pandit and Krishnaraj Srinath
Player of the match: Smriti Mandhana (Trailblazers)

- Supernovas won the toss and elected to field.

8 May 2019
15:30
Scorecard

Trailblazers; 112/6 (20 overs)	v	Velocity; 113/7 (18 overs)
Harleen Deol 43 (40); Ekta Bisht 2/13 (4 overs)		Danielle Wyatt 46 (35); Deepti Sharma 4/14 (4 overs)

Velocity won by 3 wickets
Sawai Mansingh Stadium, Jaipur
Umpires: Sadashiv Iyer and Nitin Pandit
Player of the match: Danielle Wyatt (Velocity)

- Velocity won the toss and elected to field.

9 May 2019
19:30 (D/N)
Scorecard

Supernovas; 142/3 (20 overs)	v	Velocity; 130/3 (20 overs)
Jemimah Rodrigues 77* (48); Amelia Kerr 2/21 (4 overs)		Danielle Wyatt 43 (33); Poonam Yadav 1/13 (4 overs)

Supernovas won by 12 runs
Sawai Mansingh Stadium, Jaipur
Umpires: Sadashiv Iyer and Saiyed Khalid
Player of the match: Jemimah Rodrigues (Supernovas)

- Velocity won the toss and elected to field.

== Final ==
11 May 2019
19:30 (D/N)
Scorecard

Velocity; 121/6 (20 overs)	v	Supernovas; 125/6 (20 overs)
Sushma Verma 40* (32); Lea Tahuhu 2/21 (4 overs)		Harmanpreet Kaur 51 (37); Jahanara Alam 2/21 (4 overs)

Supernovas won by 4 wickets.
Sawai Mansingh Stadium, Jaipur
Umpires: Saiyed Khalid and Krishnaraj Srinath
Player of the match: Harmanpreet Kaur (Supernovas)

- Supernovas won the toss and elected to field.
- Supernovas won the 2019 Women's T20 Challenge.
