= Rashi Kanojiya =

Indian cricketer (born 1998)

Personal information
- Full name: Rashi Kanojiya
- Born: 20 August 1998 (age 28); Agra, Uttar Pradesh, India
- Batting: Right-handed
- Bowling: Slow left-arm orthodox
- Role: Bowler

International information
- National side: India
- Only T20I (cap 76): 13 July 2023 v Bangladesh

Domestic team information
- Years: Team
- 2016/17–present: Uttar Pradesh
- 2022: Supernovas

Career statistics
Competition	WT20I	WLA	WT20
Matches	1	37	43
Runs scored	–	63	8
Batting average	–	6.30	–
100s/50s	–	0/0	0/0
Top score	–	14	3*
Balls bowled	24	2,029	894
Wickets	0	57	48
Bowling average	–	16.50	16.45
5 wickets in innings	0	0	0
10 wickets in match	0	0	0
Best bowling	–	4/17	3/3
Catches/stumpings	0/–	9/–	6/–
- Source: CricketArchive, 2 November 2023

Rashi Kanojiya (born 20 August 1998) is an Indian cricketer who currently plays for Uttar Pradesh. She plays as a slow left-arm orthodox bowler.

She made her international debut in July 2023, in a Twenty20 International for India against Bangladesh.

== Early life ==
Kanojiya was born on 20 August 1998 in Agra, Uttar Pradesh.

== Domestic career ==
Kanojiya made her debut for Uttar Pradesh in the 2016–17 Senior Women's T20 League against Goa, taking 2/12 from her 4 overs. She was the joint-leading wicket-taker in the 2021–22 Women's Senior One Day Trophy, with 15 wickets at an average of 12.40. She took her List A best bowling figures in that tournament, with 4/17 from 10 overs against Pondicherry. She was also the joint-leading wicket-taker in the 2022–23 Women's Senior Inter Zonal T20, with 10 wickets at an average of 9.50.

She played for Supernovas in the 2022 Women's T20 Challenge, appearing in one match, the final, as her side won the tournament.

== International career ==
In July 2023, Kanojiya was named in her first India squad, for the side's upcoming series against Bangladesh. She made her debut in the third Twenty20 International of the series, bowling four overs for 31 runs.
