= List of players who have scored 3,000 or more runs in Women's Twenty20 International cricket =

List of cricketers

Scoring more than 3,000 runs in T20I format of cricket is considered a significant achievement. In 2018, New Zealand batter Suzie Bates became the first woman to score 3,000 runs in Women's Twenty20 International (WT20I). Later, she also became the first player (either male or female) to score 3500, 4000 and 4500 runs in T20Is as well. In June 2026, she retired as the most prolific run scorer in WT20Is, with a total of 4758 runs.

In terms of innings, Australia's Beth Mooney is the fastest (100 innings) to reach the 3,000 run mark, whereas England's Danni Wyatt-Hodge is the slowest (145) to reach the mark.

As of November 2026, 18 players from 10 teams have scored 3,000 runs in T20Is. Out of them, 3 players are from each of Australia, India and West Indies, followed by 2 each from England and New Zealand, and, 1 from Ireland, South Africa, Sri Lanka, Thailand, and United Arab Emirates.

This list contains all the players who have scored 3,000 runs in T20I. By default the list is sorted in order of the day the feat is achieved. Overall career scores of these players will be updated on regular interval and not on daily basis.

== Key ==
- **Mat.** – Number of matches played
- **Inn.** – Number of innings batted
- **HS** – Highest score
- **Avg** – Runs scored per dismissal
- **100** – Centuries scored
- **50** – Half-centuries scored
- **3KI** – Number of innings the player took to reach 3,000 runs
- **Date** – Date on which the player reached the 3,000 run mark
- **Name in bold text** – The player is still active, therefore their stats are likely to change
- **Ref.** – Cumulative list of players runs, showing which innings they achieved 3,000 runs in

== Players with 3,000 or more T20I runs ==
Player list and statistics are updated as of November 2026.

3,000 or more runs in T20Is
No.	Player	Country	Mat.	Inn.	Runs	HS	Avg.	100	50	3KI	Date	Ref.
1	Suzie Bates	New Zealand	186	178	4758	124*	28.83	1	28	105	17 November 2018	
2	**Stafanie Taylor**	West Indies	142	138	3740	90	35.28	0	23	103	23 September 2020	
3	Meg Lanning	Australia	132	121	3405	133*	36.61	2	15	107	20 January 2022	
4	**Harmanpreet Kaur**	India	213	190	4438	103	30.60	1	19	135	20 February 2023	
5	Sophie Devine	New Zealand	158	154	3817	105	28.69	1	24	119	12 July 2023	
6	**Smriti Mandhana**	India	182	174	4923	124	31.15	2	37	122	5 January 2024	
7	**Chamari Athapaththu**	Sri Lanka	173	170	4311	119*	27.11	4	16	132	28 June 2024	
8	Alyssa Healy	Australia	162	143	3054	148*	25.45	1	17	142	8 October 2024	
9	**Beth Mooney**	Australia	128	121	3860	117*	41.50	2	31	100	17 October 2024	
10	**Danni Wyatt-Hodge**	England	187	166	3671	124	24.47	3	23	145	27 November 2024	
11	**Deandra Dottin**	West Indies; Barbados	154	150	3228	112*	26.03	2	14	135	31 January 2025	
12	**Esha Oza**	United Arab Emirates	124	122	3687	158*	35.45	5	17	106	16 December 2025	
13	**Gaby Lewis**	Ireland	124	122	3411	119	31.87	2	23	110	28 January 2026	
14	**Hayley Matthews**	West Indies; Barbados	127	127	3382	132	29.15	3	21	114	1 March 2026	
15	**Nat Sciver-Brunt**	England	141	135	3187	82	30.64	0	20	132	12 June 2026	
16	**Shafali Verma**	India	122	121	3453	100*	30.55	1	23	113	5 September 2026	
17	**Laura Wolvaardt**	South Africa	109	103	3049	126*	38.11	4	16	101	15 September 2026	
18	**Nannapat Koncharoenkai**	Thailand	150	136	3018	75	29.58	0	14	136	15 September 2026	

== See also ==
- Women's Twenty20 International
