= Velocity (Women's T20 Challenge) =

Former women's cricket club in India

Personnel
- Captain: Sneh Rana
- Coach: Devika Palshikar

Team information
- Colours: Purple
- Established: 2019; 6 years ago

History
- T20 Challenge wins: 0
T20

Velocity were an Indian women's cricket team. They were founded in 2019 to compete in the Women's T20 Challenge, which they played in until the tournament concluded in 2022. They reached the final of the competition twice, in 2019 and 2022, but lost on both occasions.

== History ==
=== 2019 ===
Velocity were founded in 2019 as part of the expansion of the Women's T20 Challenge, which had started in 2018 Women's T20 Challenge. They were captained by Mithali Raj and included overseas players Hayley Matthews, Danni Wyatt and Amelia Kerr.

In their first match, Velocity beat Trailblazers by three wickets, with Wyatt top-scoring with 46 and Ekta Bisht and Amelia Kerr taking two wickets apiece. Velocity then lost to Supernovas in their second match by 12 runs, despite 43 from Wyatt and 40* from Mithali Raj.

Velocity still qualified for the final, finishing second on Net Run Rate. They faced Supernovas once again, batting first and scoring 121/6, mainly thanks to a 71-run partnership between Sushma Verma (40*) and Amelia Kerr (36). A half-century from opposition captain Harmanpreet Kaur brought the Supernovas close, and Velocity were beaten off the final ball, which Radha Yadav hit to the boundary.

=== 2020 ===
The 2020 Women's T20 Challenge was delayed due to the COVID-19 pandemic, eventually getting underway in November. Velocity beat Supernovas by five wickets with one ball to spare in their first game, with Sune Luus top-scoring with 37*, after Ekta Bisht took 3/22 with the ball. In their second match, however, against Trailblazers, Velocity collapsed to 47 all out, with opposition bowler Sophie Ecclestone taking 4/9, and lost by nine wickets. The damage to their Net Run Rate meant Velocity failed to qualify for the final, finishing bottom of the group.

=== 2022 ===
The 2022 Women's T20 Challenge took place in May 2022. Sneh Rana replaced Mithali Raj as captain of the side. Velocity beat Supernovas in their first match of the tournament, with Shafali Verma and Laura Wolvaardt scoring half-centuries. They lost their second match, against Trailblazers, but managed to limit the damage to their Net Run Rate and qualify for the final. In the final, they faced Supernovas. Chasing 166 for victory, Velocity fell four runs short despite Wolvaardt's unbeaten 65*.

The 2022 season proved to be the final edition of the Women's T20 Challenge, with the tournament being replaced by the Women's Premier League from the 2023 season.

== Players ==
Final squad, 2022 season.

- No. denotes the player's squad number, as worn on the back of their shirt.
- ‡ denotes players with international caps.

No.	Name	Nationality	Birth date	Batting style	Bowling style	Notes
Batters
17	Shafali Verma ‡	India	28 January 2004 (age 21)	Right-handed	Right-arm off break	
–	Natthakan Chantam ‡	Thailand	1 January 1996 (age 29)	Right-handed	Right-arm medium	Overseas player
–	Kiran Navgire	India	Unknown	Right-handed	Unknown	
–	Shivali Shinde	India	23 June 1996 (age 29)	Right-handed	–	
–	Laura Wolvaardt ‡	South Africa	26 April 1999 (age 26)	Right-handed	Right-arm medium	Overseas player
All-rounders
6	Deepti Sharma ‡	India	24 August 1997 (age 28)	Left-handed	Right-arm off break	
–	Sneh Rana ‡	India	18 February 1994 (age 31)	Right-handed	Right-arm off break	Club captain
Wicket-keepers
–	Yastika Bhatia ‡	India	1 November 2000 (age 25)	Left-handed	Slow left-arm orthodox	
Bowlers
–	Simran Bahadur	India	13 December 1999 (age 26)	Left-handed	Right-arm medium	
–	Pranavi Chandra	India	Unknown	Unknown	Unknown	
–	Kate Cross ‡	England	3 October 1991 (age 34)	Right-handed	Right-arm medium-fast	Overseas player
–	Keerthi James	India	17 January 1997 (age 28)	Right-handed	Right-arm off break	
–	Aarti Kedar	India	Unknown	Unknown	Unknown	
–	Ayabonga Khaka ‡	South Africa	18 July 1992 (age 33)	Right-handed	Right-arm medium	Overseas player
–	Maya Sonawane	India	30 March 1999 (age 26)	Right-handed	Right-arm leg break	
–	Radha Yadav ‡	India	21 April 2000 (age 25)	Right-handed	Slow left-arm orthodox	

=== Overseas players ===
- (New Zealand) Amelia Kerr (2019)
- (Cricket West Indies) Hayley Matthews (2019)
- (England) Danni Wyatt (2019–2020)
- (Bangladesh) Jahanara Alam (2019–2020)
- (New Zealand) Leigh Kasperek (2020)
- (South Africa) Suné Luus (2020)
- (Thailand) Natthakan Chantam (2022)
- (England) Kate Cross (2022)
- (South Africa) Ayabonga Khaka (2022)
- (South Africa) Laura Wolvaardt (2022)

== Seasons ==
=== Women's T20 Challenge ===
Season	Final standing	League standings								Notes
Season	Final standing	P	W	L	T	NR	Pts	NRR	Pos	Notes
2019	Runners-up	2	1	1	0	0	2	+0.045	2nd	Lost to Supernovas (Women's T20 Challenge) in the final
2020	Group stage	2	1	1	0	0	2	−1.869	3rd	
2022	Runners-up	2	1	1	0	0	2	−0.022	2nd	Lost to Supernovas (Women's T20 Challenge) in the final

== Statistics ==
=== Women's T20 Challenge ===
Women's T20 Challenge – summary of results
Year	Played	Wins	Losses	Tied	NR	Win %
2019	3	1	2	0	0	33.33
2020	2	1	1	0	0	50.00
2022	3	1	2	0	0	33.33
Total	8	3	5	0	0	37.50

Women's T20 Challenge – teamwise result summary
Opposition	Mat	Won	Lost	Tied	NR	Win %
Supernovas (Women's T20 Challenge)	5	2	3	0	0	40.00
Trailblazers (Women's T20 Challenge)	3	1	2	0	0	33.33
