= Supernovas (Women's T20 Challenge) =

Former women's cricket club in India

Personnel
- Captain: Harmanpreet Kaur
- Coach: Nooshin Al Khadeer

Team information
- Colours: Light blue
- Established: 2018; 7 years ago

History
- T20 Challenge wins: 3 (2018, 2019, 2022)
T20

Supernovas were an Indian cricket team. They were founded in 2018 to compete in the Women's T20 Challenge, which they competed in until the tournament ended in 2022. They were the most successful T20 Challenge side, having won the tournament three times, in 2018, 2019 and 2022.

== History ==
=== 2018 ===
Supernovas were formed in 2018 to take part in the inaugural Women's T20 Challenge competition, in which they played a one-off match against Trailblazers. The game was viewed as a response to the men's Indian Premier League, and hopes were that the one-off game would lead towards a fully-fledged tournament in the future. Indian batter Harmanpreet Kaur was named as captain of the side, alongside fellow Indians Mithali Raj and Veda Krishnamurthy as well as overseas players Danni Wyatt, Sophie Devine, Ellyse Perry, Meg Lanning and Megan Schutt.

In the match, which took place on 22 May 2018, the Supernovas won the toss and elected to bat first. Economical bowling restricted the Trailblazers to 129/6, with Schutt and Perry the picks of the bowlers, with 2 wickets apiece. Contributions from Mithali Raj, Wyatt and Harmanpreet Kaur got the Supernovas close in response, before Perry hit the winning runs off the final ball in a tense finish. The Supernovas were therefore crowned the winners of the inaugural Women's T20 Challenge.

=== 2019 ===
2019 saw the expansion of the tournament to three teams, with the addition of Velocity. Each side played each other once in a group stage, with the top two progressing to a final. In the first game, a rematch of last year's final against Trailblazers, the Supernovas lost by 2 runs after opposition opener Smriti Mandhana hit 90 off 67 balls. In their second game, however, 77 from Jemimah Rodrigues saw Supernovas post 142/3 against Velocity. Tight bowling from Poonam Yadav (4/13) then helped Supernovas to a 12 run victory, sending them through to the final.

In the final, they faced Velocity again. Velocity batted first and posted 121/6, with Supernovas bowler Lea Tahuhu taking 2/21 from 4 overs, including a wicket maiden. 51 from Harmanpreet Kaur then set up a Supernovas victory, which again came off the final ball of the match, hit for four by Radha Yadav.

=== 2020 ===
The 2020 Women's T20 Challenge was delayed due to the COVID-19 pandemic, eventually getting underway in November. Supernovas played Velocity in their first match, losing by 5 wickets with one ball to spare. Newly signed overseas player Chamari Atapattu hit 44 for Supernovas. In their second game, Atapattu was again the star, hitting 67 as the side scored 146/6 batting first. Radha Yadav then defended 9 off the final over to send her side into the final.

Supernovas faced Trailblazers again in the final, with the Trailblazers batting first and scoring 118/8 from their 20 overs. The Supernovas struggled to chase, however, losing out by 16 runs.

=== 2022 ===
The 2022 Women's T20 Challenge took place in May 2022. Supernovas won the opening game of the tournament by 49 runs, against Trailblazers, with Pooja Vastrakar taking 4/12 from her four overs. They lost their second match, against Velocity, by 7 wickets, but still qualified for the final on Net Run Rate. They faced Velocity again in the final, and scored 165/7 batting first, with Deandra Dottin scoring 62 from 44 balls. They then restricted Velocity to 161/8 to win their third T20 Challenge title.

The 2022 season proved to be the final edition of the Women's T20 Challenge, with the tournament being replaced by the Women's Premier League from the 2023 season.

== Players ==
Final squad, 2022 season.

- No. denotes the player's squad number, as worn on the back of their shirt.
- ‡ denotes players with international caps.

No.	Name	Nationality	Birth date	Batting style	Bowling style	Notes
Batters
4	Priya Punia ‡	India	6 August 1996 (age 29)	Right-handed	Right-arm medium	
–	Muskan Malik	India	8 October 2002 (age 23)	Right-handed	Right-arm medium	
All-rounders
7	Harmanpreet Kaur ‡	India	8 March 1989 (age 36)	Right-handed	Right-arm off break	Club captain
21	Harleen Deol ‡	India	21 June 1998 (age 27)	Right-handed	Right-arm leg break	
5	Deandra Dottin ‡	West Indies	21 June 1991 (age 34)	Right-handed	Right-arm medium	Overseas player
96	Suné Luus ‡	South Africa	5 January 1996 (age 29)	Right-handed	Right-arm leg break	Overseas player
–	Ayushi Soni	India	30 September 2000 (age 25)	Right-handed	Right-arm medium	
Wicket-keepers
9	Taniya Bhatia ‡	India	28 November 1997 (age 28)	Right-handed	—	
Bowlers
11	Pooja Vastrakar ‡	India	25 September 1999 (age 26)	Right-handed	Right-arm medium	
–	Sophie Ecclestone ‡	England	6 May 1999 (age 26)	Right-handed	Slow left-arm orthodox	Overseas player
–	Mansi Joshi ‡	India	18 August 1993 (age 32)	Right-handed	Right-arm medium-fast	
–	Rashi Kanojiya	India	20 August 1998 (age 27)	Right-handed	Slow left-arm orthodox	
–	Alana King ‡	Australia	22 November 1995 (age 30)	Right-handed	Right-arm leg break	Overseas player
–	Monica Patel ‡	India	26 April 1999 (age 26)	Left-handed	Left-arm medium	
–	Meghna Singh ‡	India	18 June 1994 (age 31)	Right-handed	Right-arm medium	
–	Chandu Venkateshappa	India	Unknown	Unknown	Unknown	

=== Overseas players ===
- (New Zealand) Sophie Devine (2018–2019)
- (Australia) Meg Lanning (2018)
- (Australia) Ellyse Perry (2018)
- (Australia) Megan Schutt (2018)
- (England) Danni Wyatt (2018)
- (Sri Lanka) Chamari Athapaththu (2019–2020)
- (England) Nat Sciver (2019)
- (New Zealand) Lea Tahuhu (2019)
- (South Africa) Ayabonga Khaka (2020)
- (Cricket West Indies) Shakera Selman (2020)
- (Sri Lanka) Shashikala Siriwardene (2020)
- (Cricket West Indies) Deandra Dottin (2022)
- (England) Sophie Ecclestone (2022)
- (Australia) Alana King (2022)
- (South Africa) Suné Luus (2022)

== Seasons ==
=== Women's T20 Challenge ===
Season	Final standing	League standings								Notes
Season	Final standing	P	W	L	T	NR	Pts	NRR	Pos	Notes
2018	Champions	No Group stage								Won against IPL Trailblazers in the final
2019	Champions	2	1	1	0	0	2	+0.250	1st	Won against IPL Velocity in the final
2020	Runners-up	2	1	1	0	0	2	−0.054	2nd	Lost to IPL Trailblazers in the final
2022	Champions	2	1	1	0	0	2	+0.912	1st	Won against IPL Velocity in the final

== Statistics ==
=== Women's T20 Challenge ===
Women's T20 Challenge - summary of results
Year	Played	Wins	Losses	Tied	NR	Win %
2018	1	1	0	0	0	100.00
2019	3	2	1	0	0	66.67
2020	3	1	2	0	0	33.33
2022	3	2	1	0	0	66.67
Total	10	6	4	0	0	60.00

Women's T20 Challenge - teamwise result summary
Opposition	Mat	Won	Lost	Tied	NR	Win %
IPL Trailblazers	5	3	2	0	0	60.00
IPL Velocity	5	3	2	0	0	60.00
