= Jemimah Rodrigues =

Indian cricketer (born 2000)

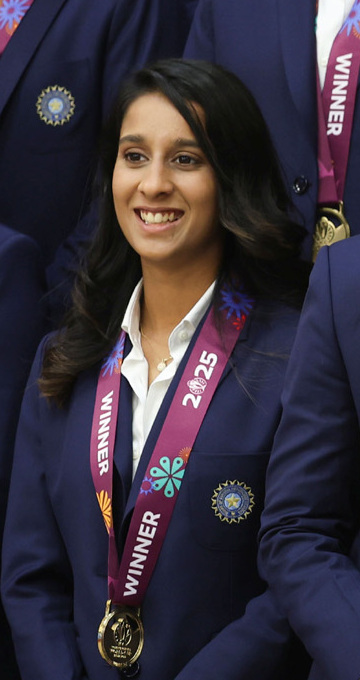
- Rodrigues in 2025

Personal information
- Full name: Jemimah Jessica Rodrigues
- Born: 5 September 2000 (age 26); Mumbai, Maharashtra, India
- Batting: Right-handed
- Bowling: Right-arm off break
- Role: Middle-order batter

International information
- National side: India (2018–present)
- Test debut (cap 91): 14 December 2023 v England
- Last Test: 6 March 2026 v Australia
- ODI debut (cap 123): 12 March 2018 v Australia
- Last ODI: 1 March 2026 v Australia
- ODI shirt no.: 5
- T20I debut (cap 56): 13 February 2018 v South Africa
- Last T20I: 2 June 2026 v England
- T20I shirt no.: 5

Domestic team information
- Years: Team
- 2014–present: Mumbai
- 2018, 2022: Trailblazers
- 2019–2020: Supernovas
- 2019: Yorkshire Diamonds
- 2021–2023: Northern Superchargers
- 2021/22: Melbourne Renegades
- 2022/23: Melbourne Stars
- 2023–present: Delhi Capitals
- 2024: Trinbago Knight Riders
- 2024/25–present: Brisbane Heat
- 2026–present: Southern Brave

Career statistics
Competition	WTest	WODI	WT20I
Matches	4	62	126
Runs scored	301	1,810	2,732
Batting average	50.16	34.15	30.02
100s/50s	0/4	3/8	0/16
Top score	73	127*	76
Balls bowled	12	43	54
Wickets	0	5	1
Bowling average	–	3.60	50.00
5 wickets in innings	–	0	0
10 wickets in match	–	0	0
Best bowling	–	4/3	1/9
Catches/stumpings	6/–	22/–	34/–
Medal record
Women's cricket
Representing India
ICC Cricket World Cup
Winner	2025 India
ICC T20 World Cup
Runner-up	2020 Australia
Commonwealth Games
Silver medal – second place	2022 Birmingham
Asian Games
Gold medal – first place	2022 Hangzhou
ACC Asia Cup
Winner	2022 Bangladesh
Runner-up	2024 Sri Lanka
- Source: ESPNcricinfo, 2 June 2026

Jemimah Jessica Rodrigues (/dʒɛˈmiː.mə rɒˈdriːɡz/ je-MEE-mə rod-REEKS; born 5 September 2000) is an Indian international cricketer who plays for the India women's national team as a middle-order batter. She was part of the squad that won the 2025 Women's Cricket World Cup, the Women's Asia Cup in 2022, the gold medal at the 2022 Asian Games and the silver medal at the 2022 Commonwealth Games.

Jemimah represents Mumbai in domestic cricket and captains the Delhi Capitals in the Women's Premier League. She plays for Brisbane Heat in the Australian Women's Big Bash League (WBBL) and Southern Brave in The Hundred. She has also played for Supernovas and Trailblazers in the Women's T20 Challenge, Yorkshire Diamonds in the Women's Cricket Super League, Melbourne Renegades and Melbourne Stars in the WBBL, Northern Superchargers in The Hundred, and Trinbago Knight Riders in the Women's Caribbean Premier League.

== Early and personal life ==
Jemimah Jessica Rodrigues was born on 5 September 2000 to Ivan and Lavita Rodrigues in a Mangalorean Catholic family in Bhandup, a suburb in Mumbai. She has two brothers, Enoch and Eli. She studied at St. Joseph's Convent High School, Mumbai and later at Rizvi College of Arts, Science & Commerce.

Jemimah started playing cricket at the age of four. Her father was a junior cricket coach in her school and coached her during the early days. Her family moved to Bandra when the children were young to provide them better sports facilities, and she grew up bowling to her brothers. She also played basketball and football during her younger days. She represented the state team in field hockey before taking up professional cricket.

In 2024, Jemimah was subjected to cyberbullying on social media based on reports that her father used her membership at the Bombay Gymkhana for conducting religious gatherings. Although his actions did not directly involve her, the cyberbullying was targeted against her, and reportedly contributed to her anxiety and mental health concerns.

== Early career ==
Jemimah played for Maharashtra in the junior categories. She made her debut for the under-19 debut side as a 13-year old. In 2017, she scored 178 runs off 142 balls against Gujarat in the under-19 category. She followed it up with a double-century in a 50-over match against Saurashtra. Her score of 202 runs came off 163 balls, and included 21 boundaries. She is only the second Indian woman after Smriti Mandhana to score a double century in a 50-over cricket match. In 2018, she was awarded the Jagmohan Dalmiya Award for the Best Domestic Junior Women's Cricketer by the Board of Control for Cricket in India.

== International career ==
Jemimah was named in the Indian team for the Women's One-Day International (WODI) and Twenty20 International (WT20I) away series against South Africa in February 2018. She made her WT20I debut in the first match of the series on 13 February 2018, and scored 37 runs in an Indian win. She made her WODI debut in the home series against Australia on 12 March 2018. She scored her first half-century in WT20Is in the match against Australia in Mumbai on 26 March 2018. In the five match WT20I away series against Sri Lanka in September 2018, Rodrigues emerged as the top run getter with 191 runs.

In October 2018, Jemimah was named in India's squad for the 2018 ICC Women's World Twenty20 tournament in the West Indies. Ahead of the tournament, she was named as one of the players to watch by the International Cricket Council (ICC). She scored 125 runs across five matches, and was named as the standout player in the Indian team by the ICC. After making only four WODI appearances in 2018, she was recalled to the Indian WODI team for the away series against New Zealand in January 2019. She made her maiden half-century in the first match she played in the series.

In January 2020, Jemimah was named in India's squad for the 2020 ICC Women's T20 World Cup in Australia. She scored 87 runs across five matches in the tournament, in which India finished as runners-up to Australia. While Rodrigues was named in India's test squad for the one-off match against England in May 2021, she did not make it to the playing eleven. In August 2022, she was part of the Indian team that won the silver medal in the cricket tournament at the 2022 Commonwealth Games in Birmingham, England. She was part of the Indian team that won the gold medal in the cricket tournament at the 2022 Asian Games.

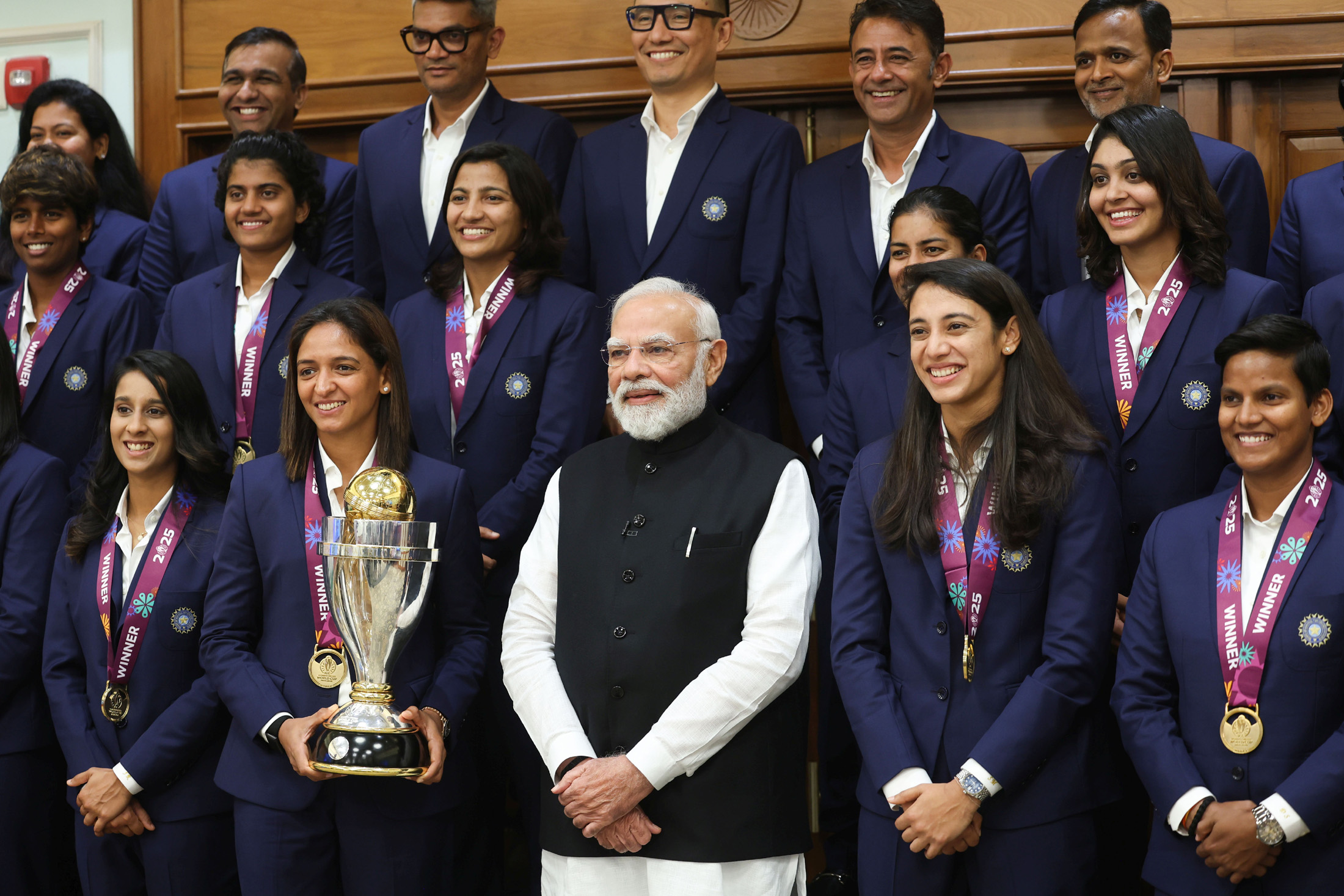
Jemimah (lower left) along with prime minister Narendra Modi and the Indian team after winning the 2025 World Cup

Jemimah made her test debut in the home series against England in December 2023. She was part of the Indian squad for the 2024 ICC Women's T20 World Cup held in October 2024. On 12 January 2025, she scored her maiden international century in a WODI during the home series against Ireland at Rajkot. In the tri-nation WODI series held in Sri Lanka in May 2025, she scored 245 runs across four innings to finish as the second leading run scorer for India behind Mandhana.

In November 2025, Jemimah was part of the Indian team that won its first-ever ICC Women's Cricket World Cup title. India defeated South Africa by 52 runs in the final at the DY Patil Stadium on 2 November 2025. In the semi-finals, India successfully chased 339 runs to hand Australia its first defeat in a World Cup since its loss to India in 2017. Rodrigues scored 127 runs and remained unbeaten to guide India to victory in the match. She formed a 167-run partnership with team captain Harmanpreet Kaur to complete the highest successful run chase in WODI history, and was awarded the Player of the Match for her effort.

== Franchise career ==
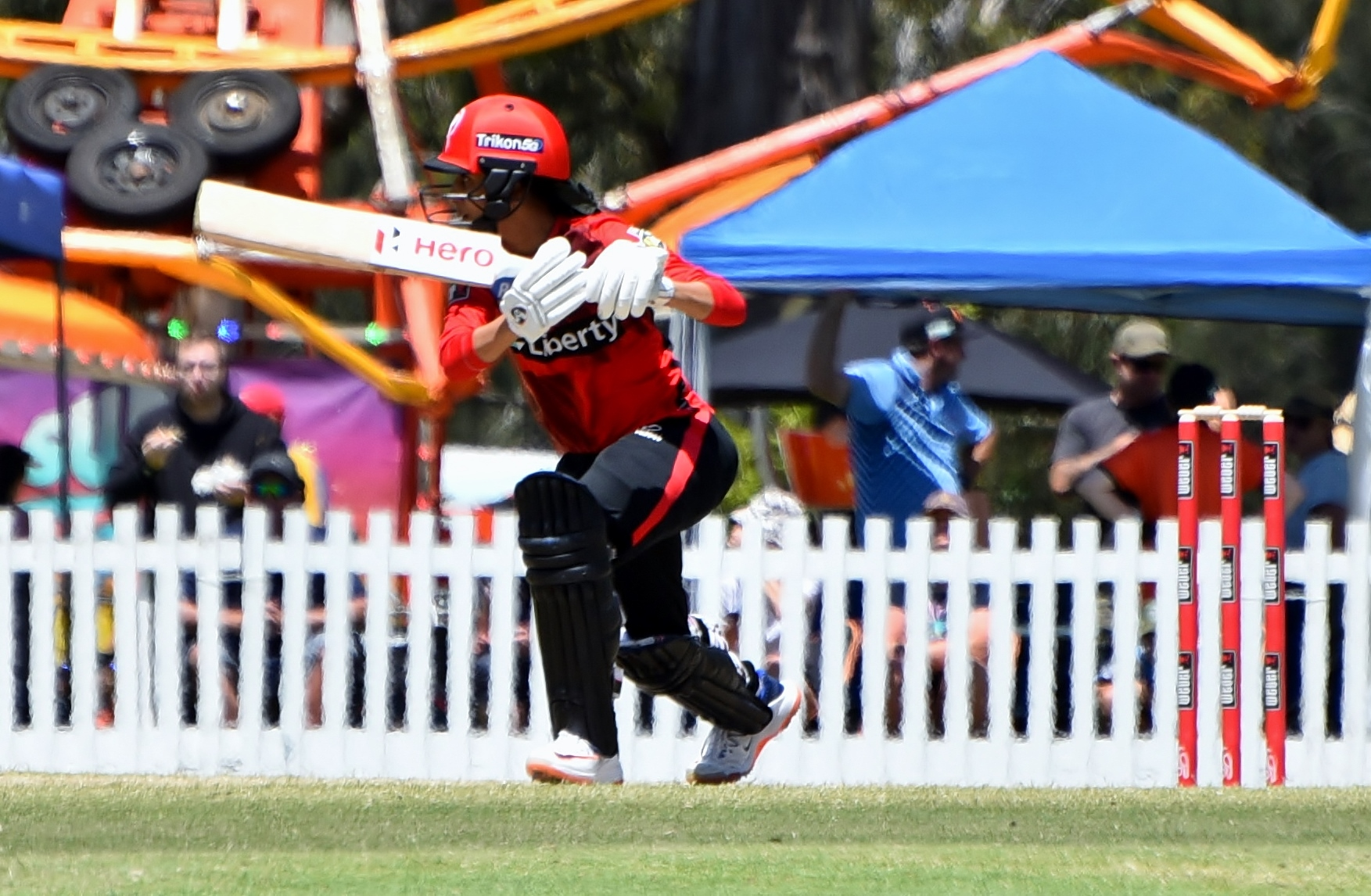
Rodrigues batting for Melbourne Renegades in the 2021–22 WBBL season

In 2018, Jemimah was announced as a part of the Trailblazers team in the newly formed Women's T20 Challenge. She was part of the side that lost to the Supernovas in the inaugural exhibition season in 2018. She was the top run-scorer with 123 runs for the Supernovas during the title winning run in the 2019 Women's T20 Challenge. She moved back to Trailblazers for the 2022 edition of the tournament.

In 2019, Jemimah signed for Yorkshire Diamonds in the English Women's Super League. In the summer of 2021, she competed in the inaugural Hundred competition for the Northern Superchargers. She posted the highest score of the competition (92 runs) against Welsh Fire. She was the second-highest run-scorer in the tournament with 249 runs at an average 41.50. In February 2022, she was retained by the Superchargers for the 2022 season. In the 2022 season, she played only two matches. In the 2023 season, she made 151 runs across ten matches in the team's run to the final.

In 2021, Jemimah was picked by Melbourne Renegades for the 2021 season of the Women's Big Bash League (WBBL). She was the top run-scorer with 333 runs across 13 matches for the Renegades in the team's run to the knock-out stages of the competition. She moved to Brisbane Heat for the 2022–23 WBBL season. In September 2024, she was acquired by Brisbane Heat in the WBBL draft for A$110,000 for the 2024–25 WBBL season.

In the inaugural auction of the Women's Premier League in February 2023, Jemimah was signed by the Delhi Capitals for ₹22 million (US$240,000). She has scored 527 runs across three seasons for the Capitals. In December 2025, she was appointed as captain of the Capitals for the 2026 season. In the 2026 WPL season, she led the Capitals to the final, in which the team lost to Royal Challengers Bangalore despite Jemimah scoring a half-century. In January 2026, she was signed by Southern Brave for the 2026 season of The Hundred.
