= Harmanpreet Kaur =

Indian cricketer (born 1989)

Harmanpreet Kaur Bhullar
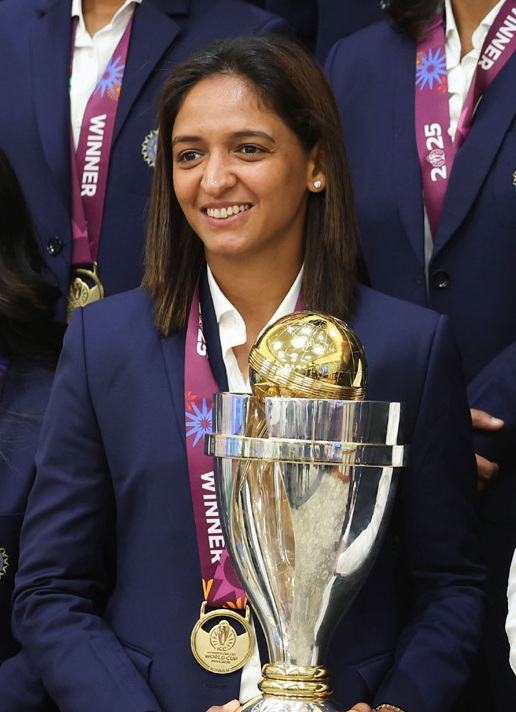
- Kaur with the Women's Cricket World Cup trophy in 2025

Personal information
- Full name: Harmanpreet Kaur Bhullar
- Born: 8 March 1989 (age 37); Moga, Punjab, India
- Batting: Right-handed
- Bowling: Right-arm off-break
- Role: All-rounder

International information
- National side: India (2009–present)
- Test debut (cap 75): 13 August 2014 v England
- Last Test: 10 July 2026 v England
- ODI debut (cap 91): 7 March 2009 v Pakistan
- Last ODI: 28 October 2026 v Zimbabwe
- ODI shirt no.: 23 (formerly 7)
- T20I debut (cap 16): 11 June 2009 v England
- Last T20I: 20 October 2026 v Zimbabwe
- T20I shirt no.: 23 (formerly 7)

Domestic team information
- Years: Team
- 2006/07–2014/15: Punjab
- 2014/15–2016/17: Railways
- 2016/17–2018/19: Sydney Thunder
- 2018–2019: Lancashire Thunder
- 2018–2022: Supernovas
- 2021: Manchester Originals
- 2021/22–present: Melbourne Renegades
- 2021/22–present: Punjab
- 2023–present: Mumbai Indians
- 2023: Trent Rockets

Career statistics
Competition	WTest	WODI	WT20I
Matches	8	167	213
Runs scored	304	4,667	4,438
Batting average	25.33	37.94	30.60
100s/50s	0/2	8/24	1/19
Top score	69	171*	103
Balls bowled	428	1,742	760
Wickets	12	31	32
Bowling average	15.41	49.45	24.84
5 wickets in innings	1	0	0
10 wickets in match	0	0	0
Best bowling	5/44	2/16	4/23
Catches/stumpings	1/–	68/–	78/–
Medal record
Women's cricket
Representing India
ICC Cricket World Cup
Winner	2025 India
Runner-up	2017 England & Wales
ICC T20 World Cup
Runner-up	2020 Australia
Commonwealth Games
Silver medal – second place	2022 Birmingham
Asian Games
Gold medal – first place	2022 Hangzhou
Gold medal – first place	2026 Aichi–Nagoya
ACC Asia Cup
Winner	2012 China
Winner	2016 Thailand
Winner	2022 Bangladesh
Winner	2026 UAE
Runner-up	2018 Malaysia
Runner-up	2024 Sri Lanka
- Source: Cricinfo, 28 October 2026

Harmanpreet Kaur Bhullar (born 8 March 1989) is an Indian cricketer who plays as an all-rounder and a former captain of the India women's national team. She is a top order batter and a right-arm off-spin bowler. She captained the Indian team that won the 2025 Women's Cricket World Cup, the Women's Asia Cup in 2012, (Note: Mithali Raj was the designated captain of the Indian team. Harmanpreet was named as the stand-in captain of the Indian team for the 2012 Asia Cup final, as regular captain Raj and vice-captain Jhulan Goswami were ruled out because of injuries.) 2016 and 2022, and the gold medal in the 2022 Asian Games. Under her captaincy, the Indian women's team achieved its first bilateral Women's One Day International (WODI) away series win against England since 1999 in 2022, the first-ever Test victory over Australia in 2023, and the first Women's Twenty20 International (WT20I) series win against England in 2025. She was also a member of the Indian team that won the silver medal in the 2022 Commonwealth Games.

Harmanpreet has scored more than 8,000 runs in international cricket. In 2018, she became the first Indian to score a century in a WT20I match. In 2019, during the home series against South Africa, she became the first Indian cricketer to play in 100 T20 International matches. In 2023, she became the first Indian to score more than 3,000 runs in WT20Is. As of 2025, she is one of the only three Indian women to score more than 3,000 runs in WODIs. She also holds the record for the most runs scored in World Cup knockout matches (331 runs).

Harmanpreet captains Mumbai Indians in the Women's Premier League (WPL), and led the team to WPL titles in 2023 and 2025. In 2016, she became the first Indian woman to be signed by an overseas T20 franchise after joining Sydney Thunder in the Australian Women's Big Bash League (WBBL). She led the Supernovas in the Indian Women's T20 Challenge to titles in 2018, 2019, and 2022. She has played for Melbourne Renegades in the WBBL, Manchester Originals and Trent Rockets in The Hundred.

Harmanpreet was awarded the Arjuna Award by the Government of India in 2017. In 2023, she was named as one of the five Cricketers of the Year by Wisden, and was the first Indian woman to be featured in the list. She also featured in the 100 Next list by Time, and 100 Women list by BBC in the same year. She was awarded the Padma Shri award, the fourth highest civilian honour, by the Government of India in 2026.

== Early and personal life ==
Harmanpreet Kaur was born on 8 March 1989 in Moga, Punjab, to Harmandar Singh Bhullar and Satwinder Kaur. Her father was a former sportsman, and later worked as a clerk at a local judicial court. She has a younger sister, Hemjeet Kaur. While she claimed to have obtained a Bachelor of Arts degree from Chaudhary Charan Singh University in Meerut, later investigation by the Punjab Police, after her honorary appointment as a deputy superintendent of police, revealed no such records. As per one of her acquaintances, she studied at the Hans Raj Mahila Maha Vidyalaya college of the Guru Nanak Dev University in Jalandhar, Punjab.

Harmanpreet took to cricket after joining the Gian Jyoti School Academy, about 30 km (19 mi) away from her residence, and trained under Kamaldeesh Singh Sodhi. She played with men during the formative days of her career. In 2014, she moved to Mumbai and began working for the Indian Railways.

== International career ==
=== Debut and early career (2009–2012) ===
In early 2009, Harmanpreet was named in the Indian team for the 2009 World Cup. She made her WODI debut aged 20 against Pakistan at Bradman Oval during the World Cup. In the match, she bowled four overs conceding 10 runs and took a catch. She played six matches in the World Cup, scoring 42 runs across three innings. In June 2009, she made her Twenty20 International debut in the 2009 edition of the ICC Women's World Twenty20 against England at Taunton, in which she scored eight runs off seven balls.

During England's tour of India in 2009-10, she played two WODIs and three WT20Is. She scored her first half-century in WODIs in the series on 1 March 2010. In the WT20 series that followed, she scored 74 runs across three matches. She was noted for her ability to hit the ball a long way during a quick-fire innings of 33 runs in the second WT20I game of the series.

=== Test debut and formative years (2012–2016) ===
Harmanpreet was named as the stand-in captain of the Indian team for the 2012 Asia Cup final, as regular captain Mithali Raj and vice-captain Jhulan Goswami were ruled out because of injuries. India won the match against Pakistan by 81 runs to win the title. She scored her first WODI century against England on 3 February 2013 at Brabourne Stadium in Mumbai. In March 2013, she was named the captain of the WODI team when Bangladesh toured India. In the series, she scored her second WODI century, and finished the series with 195 runs at average of 97.50.

In August 2014, Harmanpreet was one of the eight players on debut in the Test match against England played at Sir Paul Getty's Ground in Wormsley. She scored nine runs across two innings as India beat England by six wickets. In November 2014, she scored 17 runs and took nine wickets in a Test match against South Africa at Mysore to help India win the match by an innings and 34 runs. In January 2016, she helped India to win the WT20I series against Australia. She scored 70 runs across two innings including a player of the match performance of 46 runs in 31 balls in India's successful chase in the first match of the series. In the subsequent 2016 ICC Women's World Twenty20 hosted by India, Harmanpreet scored 89 runs and took seven wickets across four matches.

=== World Cup final and captaincy (2017–2024) ===
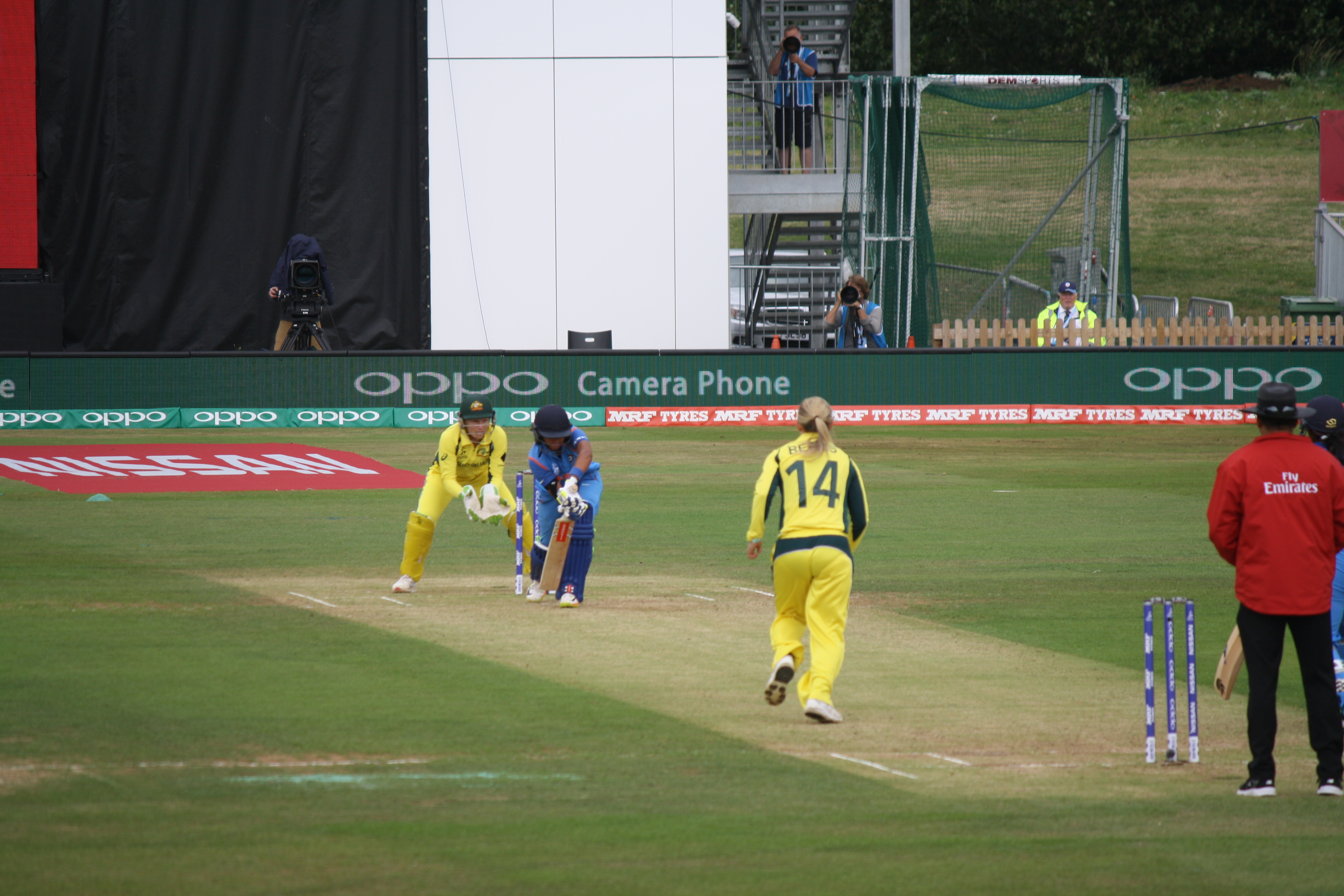
Harmanpreet batting during the 2017 Women's Cricket World Cup

Harmanpreet was the captain of the Indian side that won the 2016 Women's Twenty20 Asia Cup held in November–December 2016. She was part of the Indian squad that reached the final of the 2017 Women's Cricket World Cup where the team lost to England by nine runs. On 20 July 2017, she scored 171 runs off 115 balls against Australia in the semi-finals of the World Cup. It is the second-highest score by an Indian batter in WODIs, the highest individual score for India in the Women's Cricket World Cup, and the highest ever individual score in a knockout stage of a Women's World Cup match. In July 2017, Harmanpreet became the second Indian batter to feature in the top-10 of ICC Women's ODI Player Rankings after Mithali Raj. In December 2017, she was named in the ICC Women's T20I Team of the Year.

In October 2018, Harmanpreet was named as the captain of Indian squad for the 2018 ICC Women's World Twenty20 tournament in the West Indies. In the opening match of the tournament, against New Zealand, she became the first woman for India to score a century in WT20Is, when she made 103 runs from 51 balls. She was the leading run-scorer for India in the tournament, with 183 runs in five matches. During the home series against South Africa in September–October 2019, she became the first Indian cricketer to appear in 100 T20 International matches.

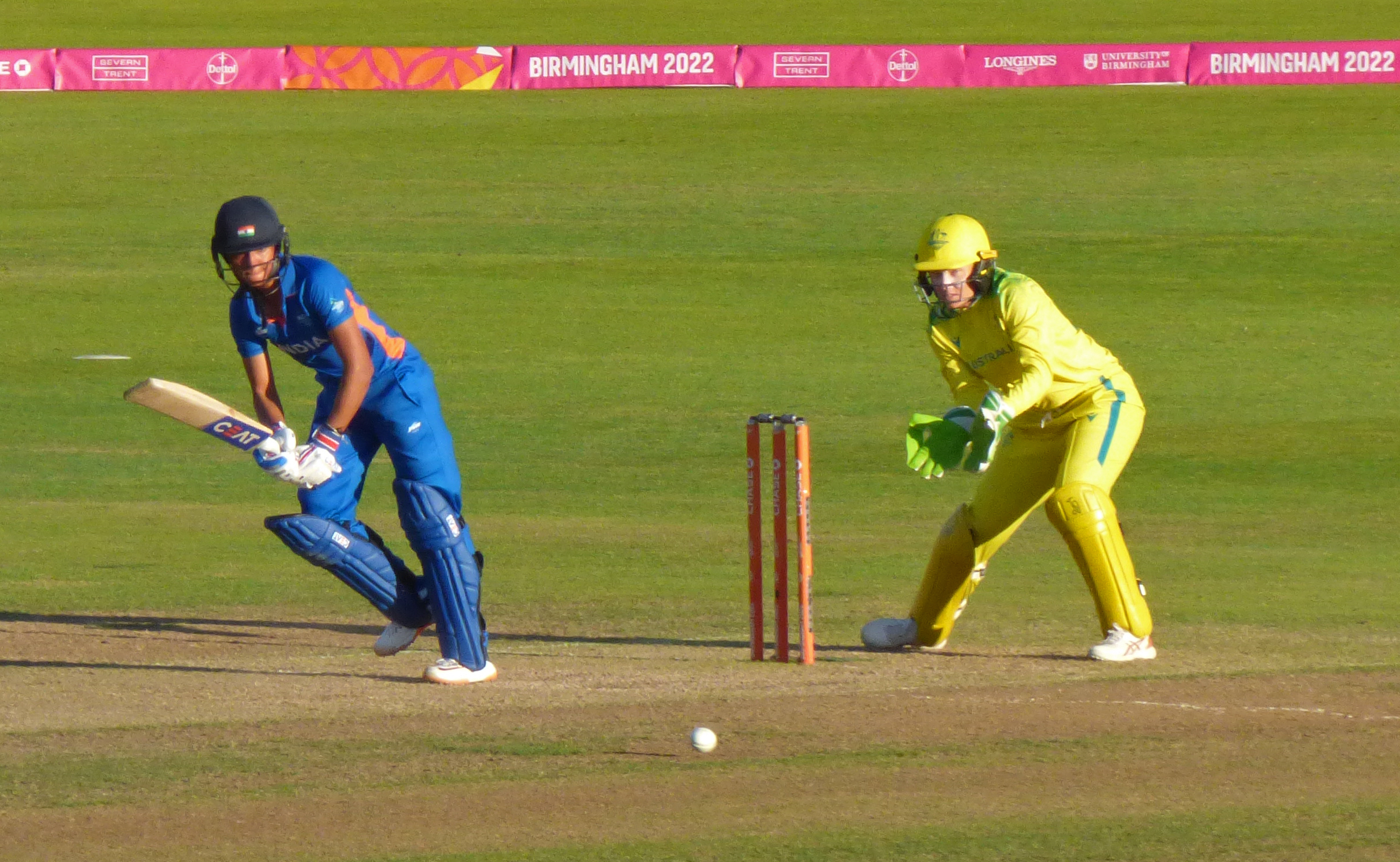
Harmanpreet in the match against Australia in the 2022 Commonwealth Games

In January 2020, Harmanpreet was named as the captain of India's squad for the 2020 ICC Women's T20 World Cup in Australia. In March 2021, in a match against South Africa, she became fifth Indian woman cricketer to represent the country in 100 ODIs. In May 2021, she was named as the vice-captain of India's Test squad for their one-off match against England. In January 2022, she was named in India's team for the 2022 Women's Cricket World Cup in New Zealand. She was the top-run scorer for India in the tournament with 318 runs across seven matches. In July 2022, she captained the Indian team that won the silver medal in the cricket tournament at the 2022 Commonwealth Games in Birmingham, England. In the away series against England in September 2022, Harmanpreet led the Indian team to its first bilateral WODI series win in England since 1999. She was named player of the series after topping the run scoring charts with 221 runs in three matches. Her contributions included a century (143*) in the second match of the series, which is the highest individual score by an Indian captain in WODIs and the highest against England women in England. She captained the Indian team that won the gold medal in the cricket tournament at the 2022 Asian Games held in September–October 2022.

In February 2023, Harmanpreet captained the Indian team in the 2023 ICC Women's T20 World Cup held in South Africa. In the group stage match against Ireland in the World Cup, she became the first Indian to score more than 3,000 runs in WT20Is. In July 2023, Harmanpreet was fined 75% of her match fee, received four demerit points, and was suspended for two matches by the International Cricket Council (ICC) for breaching the code of conduct for her outbursts during the final WODI of the tour of Bangladesh. She hit the stumps with her bat after she was declared out, publicly criticised the umpires in the post-match presentation, and shouted during a photo session, leading the Bangladeshi players to walk-out. In December 2023, she led India to its first ever test win against Australia during the one-off test match at Wankhede Stadium in Mumbai. She was named as one of the five Wisden Cricketers of the Year for 2023 and was the first Indian woman to be featured in the list.

Harmanpreet captained the Indian squad for the 2024 ICC Women's T20 World Cup and for their home ODI series against New Zealand in October 2024. In the World Cup, she was the top-scorer for India with 150 runs across four matches. In the away series against England in July 2025, she led India to its first WT20I series win against England.

=== World Cup win and beyond (2025–present) ===
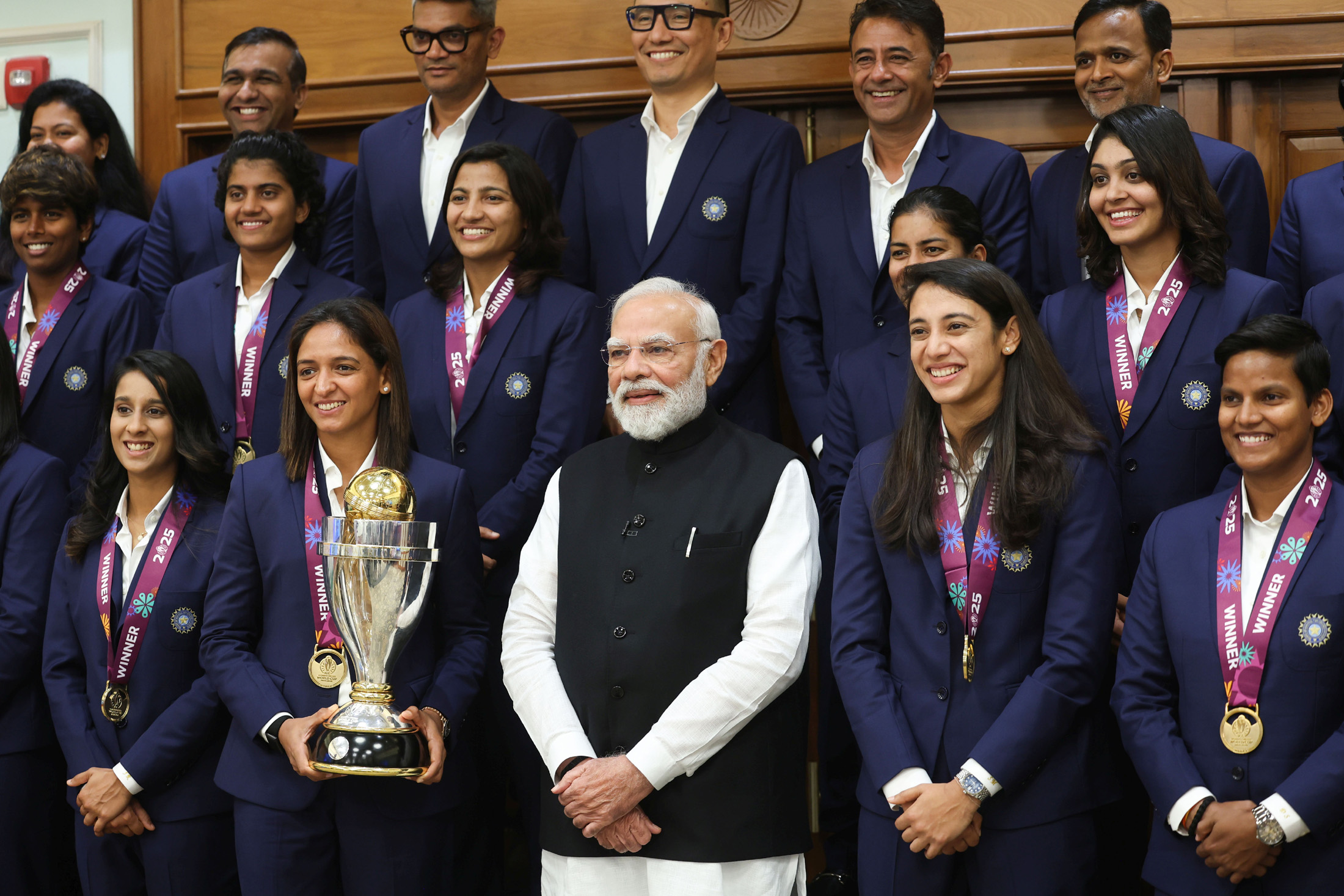
The Indian team with prime minister Narendra Modi after the 2025 World Cup win

In October–November 2025, Harmanpreet captained India to its first-ever ICC Women's Cricket World Cup title. India defeated South Africa by 52 runs in the final at the DY Patil Stadium on 2 November 2025. In the semi-finals, India successfully chased 339 runs to hand Australia its first defeat in a World Cup since its loss to India in 2017. Harmanpreet scored 89 runs and shared a 167-run partnership with Jemimah Rodrigues, which helped India complete the highest successful run chase in WODI history. In the final against South Africa, Harmanpreet took the catch that dismissed Nadine de Klerk, which ended the match. With her score of 20 runs in the final, she holds the record for the most runs scored in World Cup knockout matches (331 runs). Media reports highlighted Harmanpreet's on-field leadership, positive field settings and use of bowling resources as factors in India's victory. The World Cup was reported as a major moment in the Indian cricketing history, and the win was credited with producing a significant surge in public and media attention for the women's game across India.

On 6 October 2026, Harmanpreet announced her decision to step down as India's Captain across all formats confirming she'll continue serve the team as a player.

== Franchise cricket ==
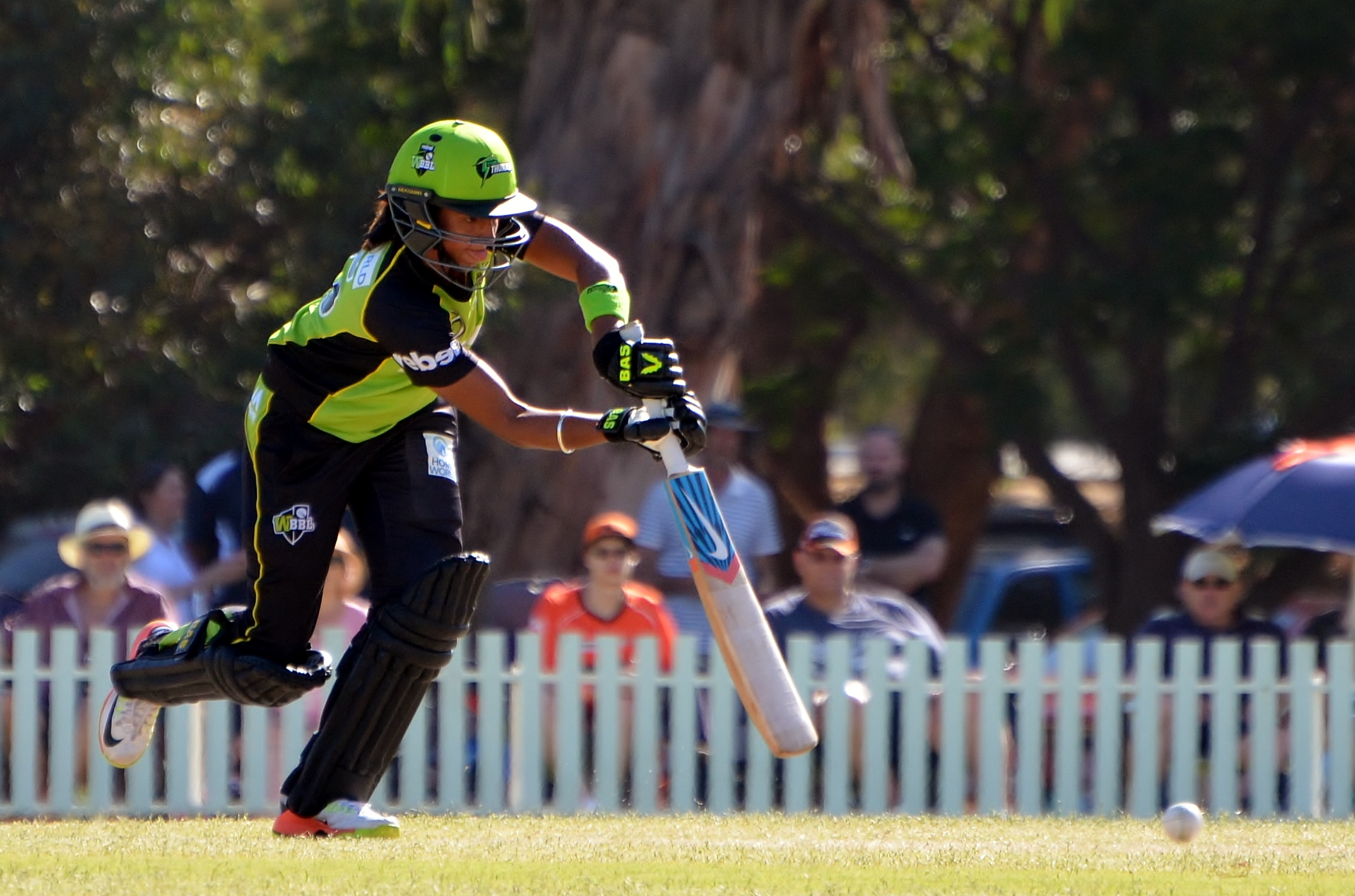
Harmanpreet batting for Sydney Thunder in the 2016-17 Big Bash League

In June 2016, Harmanpreet signed for Sydney Thunder in the Women's Big Bash League for the 2016–17 season. She was the first Indian women's cricketer to sign for an overseas Twenty20 franchise. She continued to represent the Thunder in the 2018–19 Women's Big Bash League season. In September 2021, she was signed by Melbourne Renegades for the 2021-22 Big Bash League. She scored 399 runs and took 15 wickets in 11 matches to be named as the Player of the Tournament in the 2021–22 season.

In 2018, Harmanpreet was announced as the captain of the Supernovas team in the newly formed Women's T20 Challenge. She led the side to victory in the inaugural exhibition season in 2018. Later, Supernovas won the title in 2019 and 2022 under Harmanpreet's captaincy.

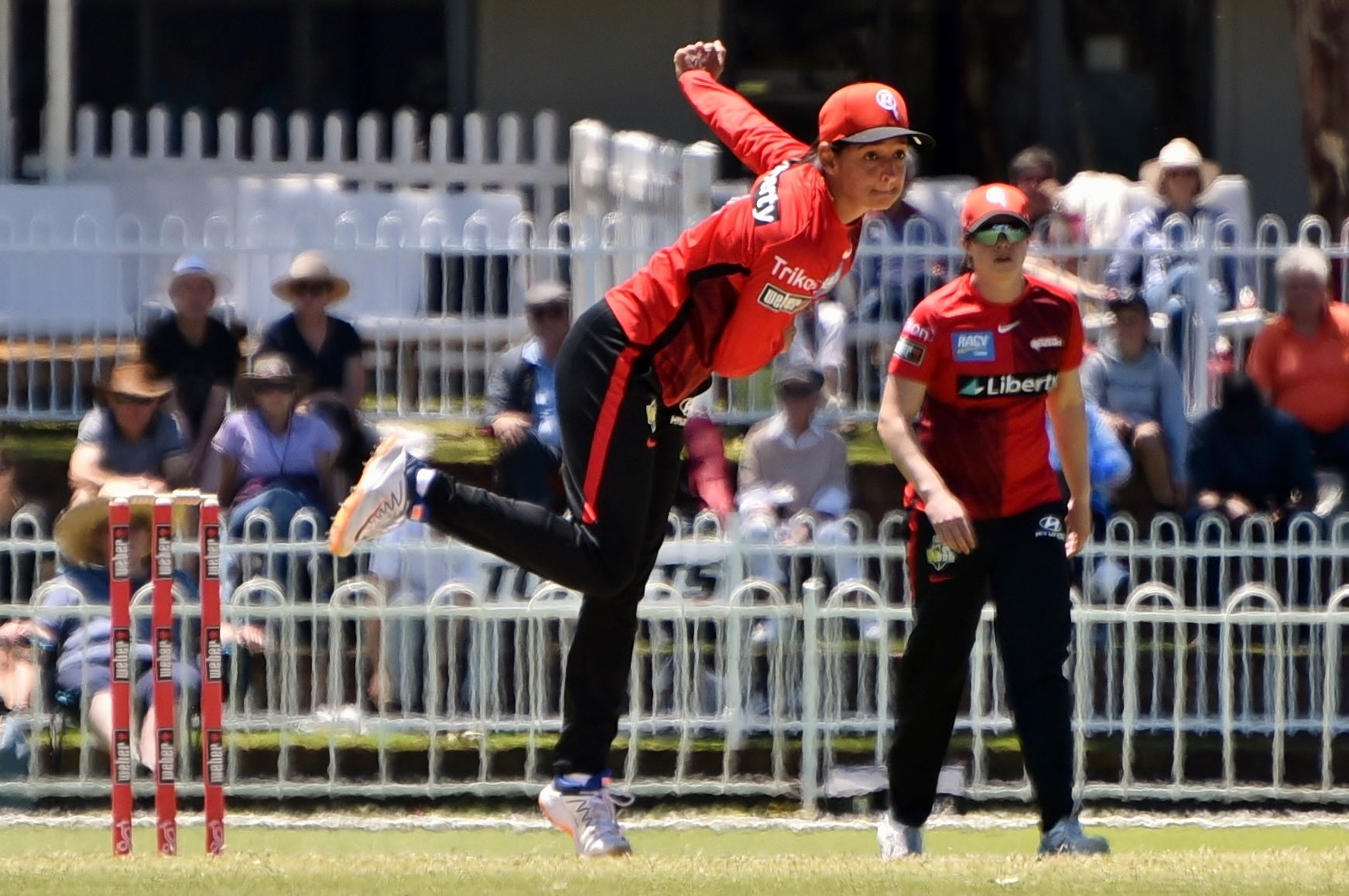
Harmanpreet bowling for Melbourne Renegades in the 2021-22 Big Bash League

In 2021, Harmanpreet was drafted by Manchester Originals for the inaugural season of The Hundred. She scored 104 runs across three innings at an average of 52, before withdrawing herself from the tournament due to injury. For the 2023 The Hundred season, she signed for Trent Rockets. She scored only 72 runs across seven matches during the 2023 season, and did not return for the next season.

In February 2023, in the inaugural Women's Premier League auction, Harmanpreet was bought by Mumbai Indians for ₹18 million (US$190,000). She was later appointed as the captain of the side, and led the team to the inaugural WPL title in the 2023 season. In March 2025, she became the first captain to lead a side to multiple WPL trophies, after leading Mumbai Indians to their second title in the 2025 WPL season. In the WPL, she has mostly played as a batter, and has scored 851 runs in 27 matches at a batting average of 40.52 across the three seasons.

== Honours ==
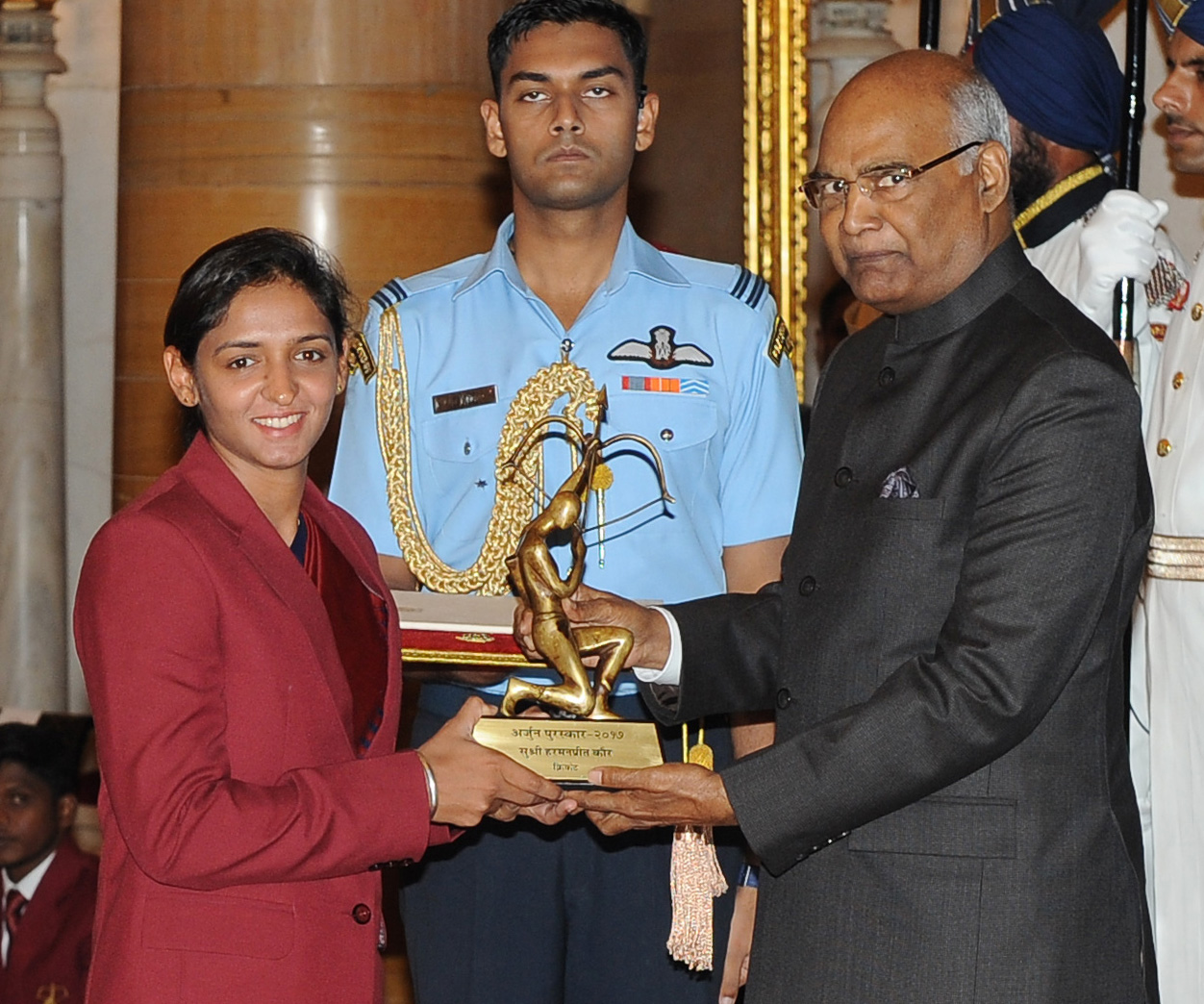
Harmanpreet receiving the Arjuna Award from Indian President Ram Nath Kovind in 2017

=== India ===
- Women's Cricket World Cup: 2025
- Women's Twenty20 Asia Cup: 2012, 2016, 2022
- Asian Games: Gold medal (2022)
- Commonwealth Games: Silver medal (2022)

=== Supernovas ===
- Women's T20 Challenge: 2018, 2019, 2022

=== Mumbai Indians ===
- Women's Premier League: 2023, 2025

=== Individual ===
- Arjuna Award: 2017
- Women's Big Bash League Player of the Tournament: 2021–22
- Wisden Cricketer of the Year: 2023
- Time 100 Next: 2023
- BBC's 100 Women: 2023
- Padma Shri Award: 2026
