= Muskan Malik (cricketer) =

Indian cricketer (born 2002)

Personal information
- Full name: Muskan Malik
- Born: 8 October 2002 (age 24); Aligarh, Uttar Pradesh, India
- Batting: Right-handed
- Bowling: Right-arm medium
- Role: Batter

Domestic team information
- Years: Team
- 2015/16–present: Uttar Pradesh
- 2020–2022: Supernovas

Career statistics
Competition	WLA	WT20
Matches	28	41
Runs scored	1,120	784
Batting average	43.07	27.03
100s/50s	4/4	0/2
Top score	114	63
Catches/stumpings	8/–	18/–
- Source: CricketArchive, 28 October 2023

Muskan Malik (born 8 October 2002, Hindi: मुस्कान मलिक) is an Indian cricketer who primarily plays as a right-handed batter. She plays for Uttar Pradesh and India A, and also played for IPL Supernovas in the Women's T20 Challenge before the tournament ended in 2022.

== Early life ==
Born on 8 October 2002, Muskan Malik joined Hamza Cricket Academy in her hometown Aligarh at a young age. She was initially mentored by her younger brother Rashid Malik. Later, she joined Abdul Cricket Academy, where she started developing her skills under the guidance of veteran coach Masood

== Career ==
In November 2022, she was selected in India A women's squad to play the 2022–23 Women's Senior T20 Challenger Trophy In May 2023, Muskan was selected for National Cricket Academy coaching camp in Bengaluru, alongside Archana Devi and Parshvi Chopra. In June 2023, she was selected in ACC Women's T20 Emerging Teams Asia Cup under the leadership of Shweta Sehrawat. She also captained Uttar Pradesh's Under-19 cricket team.
