= Ayushi Soni =

Indian cricketer (born 2000)

Personal information
- Born: 30 September 2000 (age 26); Delhi, India
- Batting: Right-handed
- Bowling: Right-arm medium
- Role: Batter

International information
- National side: India
- Only T20I (cap 67): 23 March 2021 v South Africa

Domestic team information
- Years: Team
- 2015/16–present: Delhi
- 2022–present: Supernovas

Career statistics
Competition	WT20I
Matches	1
Runs scored	–
Batting average	–
100s/50s	–
Top score	–
Balls bowled	–
Wickets	–
Bowling average	–
5 wickets in innings	–
10 wickets in match	–
Best bowling	–
Catches/stumpings	0/–
- Source: ESPNcricinfo, 9 December 2022

Ayushi Soni (born 30 September 2000) is an Indian cricketer. In November 2020, Soni played for the IPL Supernovas in the 2020 Women's T20 Challenge tournament. In February 2021, Soni earned her maiden call-up to the India women's cricket team, for their limited overs matches against South Africa. She made her Women's Twenty20 International (WT20I) debut for India, against South Africa, on 23 March 2021.
