= Mithali Raj =

Indian cricketer (born 1982)

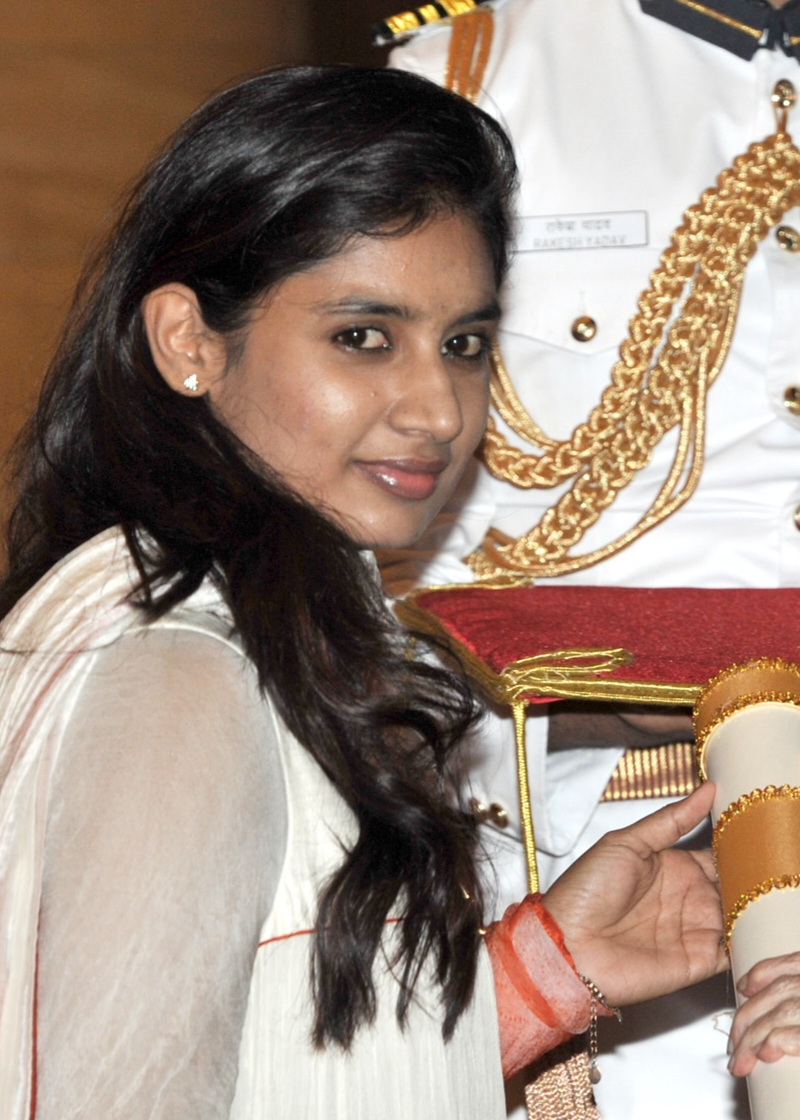
- Mithali receiving the Padma Shri in 2015

Personal information
- Born: 3 December 1982 (age 43); Jodhpur, Rajasthan, India
- Height: 5 ft 4 in (1.63 m)
- Batting: Right-handed
- Bowling: Right-arm leg break
- Role: Top-order batter

International information
- National side: India (1999–2022)
- Test debut (cap 56): 14 January 2002 v England
- Last Test: 30 September 2021 v Australia
- ODI debut (cap 56): 26 June 1999 v Ireland
- Last ODI: 27 March 2022 v South Africa
- ODI shirt no.: 03
- T20I debut (cap 9): 5 August 2006 v England
- Last T20I: 9 March 2019 v England

Domestic team information
- Years: Team
- 1996/97–1998/99: Andhra
- 1999/00: Air India
- 2000/01–2021/22: Railways
- 2018: Supernovas
- 2019–2022: Velocity

Career statistics
Competition	WTest	WODI	WT20I
Matches	12	232	89
Runs scored	699	7,805	2,364
Batting average	43.68	50.68	37.52
100s/50s	1/4	7/64	0/17
Top score	214	125*	97*
Balls bowled	72	171	6
Wickets	0	8	0
Bowling average	–	11.37	–
5 wickets in innings	–	0	–
10 wickets in match	–	0	–
Best bowling	–	3/4	–
Catches/stumpings	12/–	58/-	19/–
Medal record
Women's cricket
Representing India
ICC Cricket World Cup
Runner-up	2005 South Africa
Runner-up	2017 England & Wales
ACC Asia Cup
Winner	2004 Sri Lanka
Winner	2005-06 Pakistan
Winner	2006 India
Winner	2008 Sri Lanka
Winner	2012 China
Winner	2016 Thailand
Runner-up	2018 Malaysia
- Source: ESPNcricinfo, 31 October 2025

Mithali Raj (born 3 December 1982) is an Indian former cricketer who captained the national team from 2004 to 2022. She was the highest run-scorer in women's international cricket, and ESPN ranked her as one of the greatest female cricketers of all time. Raj has received several national and international awards, including the Wisden Leading Woman Cricketer in the World in 2017, Arjuna Award in 2003, the Padma Shri in 2015, and Major Dhyan Chand Khel Ratna in 2021.

Raj holds numerous records in international cricket. She is the only female cricketer to surpass 7,000 runs in Women's One Day International (WODI) matches. She is the first player to score seven consecutive 50s in ODIs. She also holds the record for most half-centuries in WODIs.

In 2005, Raj became the permanent captain of India. She is the only female player to have captained India in more than one ICC ODI World Cup final, doing so in the 2005 and the 2017.

In June 2018, during the 2018 Women's Twenty20 Asia Cup, she became the first player from India to score 2000 runs in T20Is. She also became the first female cricketer to reach 2000 WT20I runs.

On 1 February 2019, during India's series against New Zealand Women, Mithali Raj became the first woman to play in 200 ODI matches. In September 2019 she announced her retirement from T20Is to focus on ODI cricket. In 2019, she became the first woman to complete 20 years in international cricket.

In July 2021, Raj broke Charlotte Edwards's record of 10,273 runs to become the player with the most runs in women's international cricket.

On 8 June 2022, Raj announced her retirement from all formats of international cricket.

== Early life ==
Mithali Raj was born on 3 December 1982, in Jodhpur, Rajasthan to a Tamil family. Her mother is Leela Raj, and her father, Dorai Raj, was a warrant officer in the Indian Air Force. She lives in Hyderabad, Telangana.

Raj started playing cricket at the age of ten. She graduated from Keyes High School for Girls in Hyderabad, and Kasturba Gandhi Junior College for Women in Secunderabad. She received cricket coaching in elementary school alongside her older brother.

== Domestic career ==
Raj played for Air India alongside Purnima Rau, Anjum Chopra, and Anju Jain, before joining Railways for the domestic championship. She has played for the Supernovas and Velocity in the Women's T20 Challenge.

== International career ==
Mithali Raj has played all three of India's cricket formats: Test, ODI, and T20. She was named among the probables for the 1997 Women's Cricket World Cup when she was fourteen, but she did not make it into the final squad. She made her ODI debut in 1999 against Ireland at Milton Keynes, UK, and scored an unbeaten 114 runs. She then made her Test debut in the 2001–02 season against South Africa in Lucknow, Uttar Pradesh, India.

On 17 August 2002, at the age of 19, she broke Karen Rolton's world record for the highest individual test score of 209* in her third test, scoring a new high of 214 against England in the second and final test at County Ground, Taunton, UK. The record has since been surpassed by Kiran Baluch of Pakistan, who scored 242 against the West Indies in March 2004.

In South Africa in 2005, Raj led India to their first finals in 2005 Women's Cricket World Cup, where they lost to Australia.

In August 2006 she led her team to their first-ever Test series victory in England, and concluded the year by successfully defending the Asia Cup without losing a single game.

Mithali Raj won the 2003 Arjuna award.

At the 2013 Women's World Cup, Raj was the number 1 woman ODI cricketer. In her career, she scored one century and four fifties in Test cricket, five centuries and five fifties in ODIs, together with best bowling figures of 3–4 in ODIs, and ten fifties in T20s.

In February 2017 she became the second player to score 5,500 runs in ODIs. Raj is the first player to captain the most matches for India in ODI and T20I.

In July 2017 she became the first player to score 6,000 runs in WODIs. She led the Indian team to the final of the 2017 Women's Cricket World Cup where the team lost to England by nine runs.

In December 2017 she played on the ICC Women's ODI Team of the Year.

In October 2018 she played on India's squad for the 2018 ICC Women's World Twenty20 tournament in the West Indies.

Raj retired from T20I cricket in September 2019, saying in a BCCI press statement: "After representing India in T20 internationals since 2006, I wish to retire from T20Is to focus my energies on readying myself for the 2021 one-day World Cup".

In November 2020, Raj was nominated for the Rachael Heyhoe-Flint Award for ICC Female Cricketer of the Decade, and the award for women's ODI cricketer of the decade.

In May 2021 she was named captain of India's Test squad for their one-off (one-time only) match against the England women's cricket team. In January 2022, she was named captain of India's team for the 2022 Women's Cricket World Cup in New Zealand.

On 8 June 2022, Raj announced her retirement from all formats of International cricket.

== Coaching career ==
Raj was the batting consultant for India women's national cricket team, and has played as a player-coach.

== Records ==
- Raj is nicknamed "Lady Tendulkar of Indian Women's cricket", as she is currently the all-time leading run-scorer for India in all formats, including Tests, ODIs and T20Is.
- During the 2017 Women's Cricket World Cup, Raj scored her seventh consecutive half-century, and notched the record for most consecutive fifties by a player.
- Raj is the 1st Indian and 5th woman cricketer overall to score over 1,000 World Cup runs.
- She holds the record for playing the most consecutive Women's One Day Internationals for a team (109).

Mithali Raj was involved in controversy with cricket management because of her attitude towards the game during the 2018 ICC Women's World Twenty20. In a letter to the BCCI, she accused coach Ramesh Powar and BCCI COA member Diana Edulji of bias, and of humiliating her by not including her in the T20 world cup semifinals. Powar, in turn, criticized Raj for threatening to retire from cricket when asked to play down the batting order. He further accused Raj of "blackmailing and pressuring coaches" and causing division in the team during the recently concluded World T20. He added, "despite being a senior player in the team she puts in minimum inputs in team meetings. She could not understand and adapt to the team plan. She ignored her role and batted for own milestones. Lack of keeping the momentum going which was putting extra pressure on other batters." Coach Powar also criticized Raj's 50 against Ireland in the same tournament, in which she ended up playing 25 dot balls.

Her relationship with the T20 team's captain Harmanpreet Kaur was strained. However, after reappointment of Ramesh Powar as Head Coach of the Indian women's cricket team in May 2021, the two have reconciled. Raj and Kaur confirmed in various interviews that there was no bad blood between them.

== Awards ==
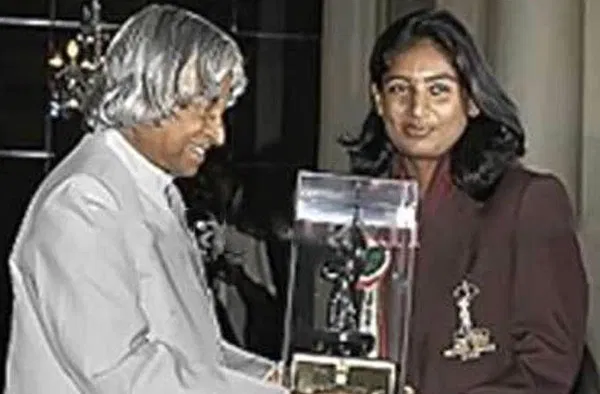
Mithali receiving Arjuna Award from President A. P. J. Abdul Kalam on 2003

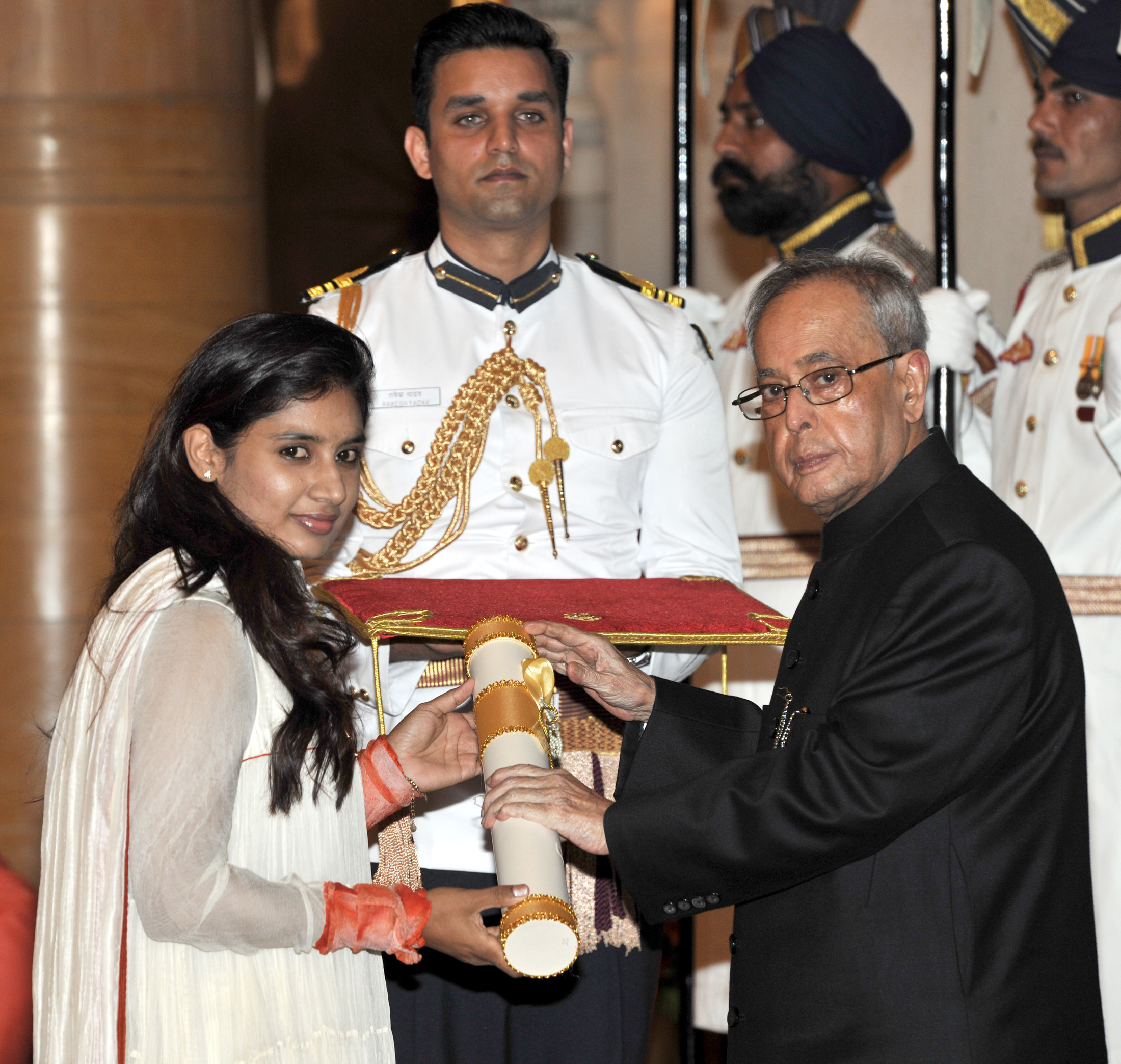
President Shri Pranab Mukherjee presenting the Padma Shri Award to Mithali Raj, New Delhi, 8 April 2015

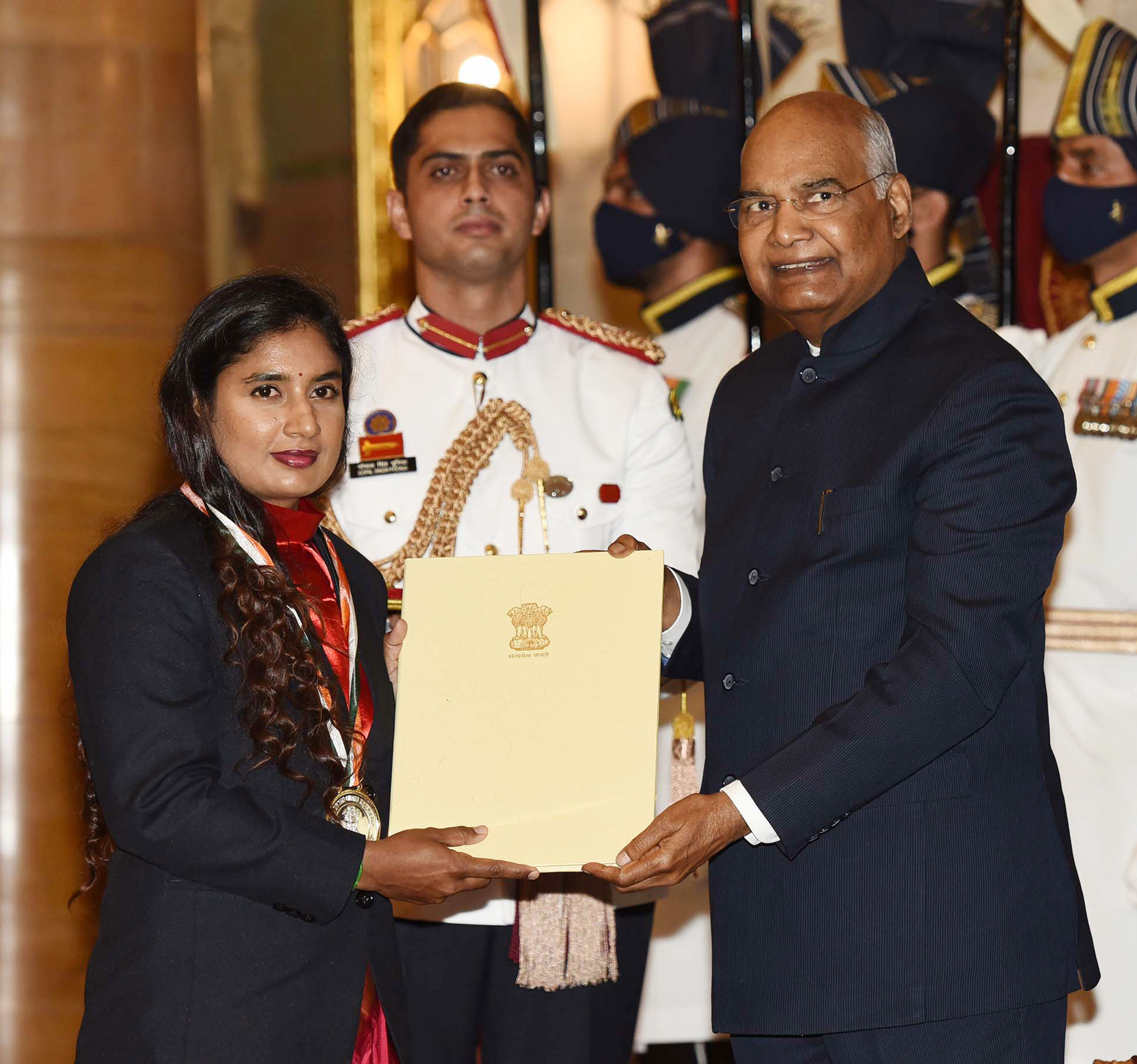
Receiving Major Dhyan Chand Khel Ratna Award from President Ram Nath Kovind on 13 November 2021

Year	Award	Notes
2003	Arjuna Award	Second Highest Sporting Honour of India
2015	Padma Shri	India's fourth highest civilian award
2017	Youth Sports Icon of Excellence Award.!	At the Radiant Wellness Conclave, Chennai
2017	Vogue Sportsperson of the Year	At Vogue's 10th anniversary
2017	BBC 100 Women	
2017	Wisden Leading Woman Cricketer in the World	
2021	Khel Ratna Award	Highest sporting honour of India

== Outside cricket ==
=== Personal life and interests ===
She is a Bharatanatyam dancer.

=== In popular culture ===
After the 2017 Women's Cricket World Cup, Viacom 18 Motion Pictures acquired the rights to make a feature film of Raj's life. She said, "Hoping that this movie inspires more people, especially young girls to take up sports as a career".

Shooting was scheduled to start in 2019. Raj said "I think Priyanka Chopra will be a great choice (to play me in the biopic). Our personalities match a lot. I am not a movie buff, so I'd love the experts to do their job." However, finally Taapsee Pannu was cast in the role of Mithali Raj in a biopic titled Shabaash Mithu. Rahul Dholakia was to direct in 2020. However, filming was delayed due to COVID-19. In June 2021, Srijit Mukherji replaced Dholakia as director. The film was released on 15 July 2022. The movie was a financial disaster, earning only ₹2.88 crores with a budget of ₹30 crores.
