= Simran Bahadur =

Indian cricketer (born 1999)

Personal information
- Full name: Simran Bahadur
- Born: 13 December 1999 (age 26); New Delhi, India
- Batting: Left-handed
- Bowling: Right-arm medium
- Role: Bowler

International information
- National side: India
- Only ODI (cap 136): 15 February 2022 v New Zealand
- T20I debut (cap 66): 20 March 2021 v South Africa
- Last T20I: 27 June 2022 v Sri Lanka

Domestic team information
- Years: Team
- 2018/19–present: Delhi
- 2022: Velocity

Career statistics
Competition	WT20I
Matches	6
Runs scored	10
Batting average	10.00
100s/50s	0/0
Top score	10
Balls bowled	90
Wickets	1
Bowling average	126.00
5 wickets in innings	0
10 wickets in match	0
Best bowling	1/29
Catches/stumpings	1/–
- Source: ESPNcricinfo, 9 July 2022

Simran Bahadur (born 13 December 1999) is an Indian cricketer who plays mainly as a bowler. In February 2021, Bahadur earned her maiden call-up to the India women's cricket team, for their limited overs matches against South Africa. She made her Women's Twenty20 International (WT20I) debut for India, against South Africa, on 20 March 2021.

In January 2022, she was named as one of three reserve players in India's team for the 2022 Women's Cricket World Cup in New Zealand. She made her Women's One Day International (WODI) debut on 15 February 2022, against New Zealand.

In December 2023, she was signed by Royal Challengers Bangalore at the Women's Premier League auction, for the 2024 season.
