= Radha Yadav =

Indian cricketer

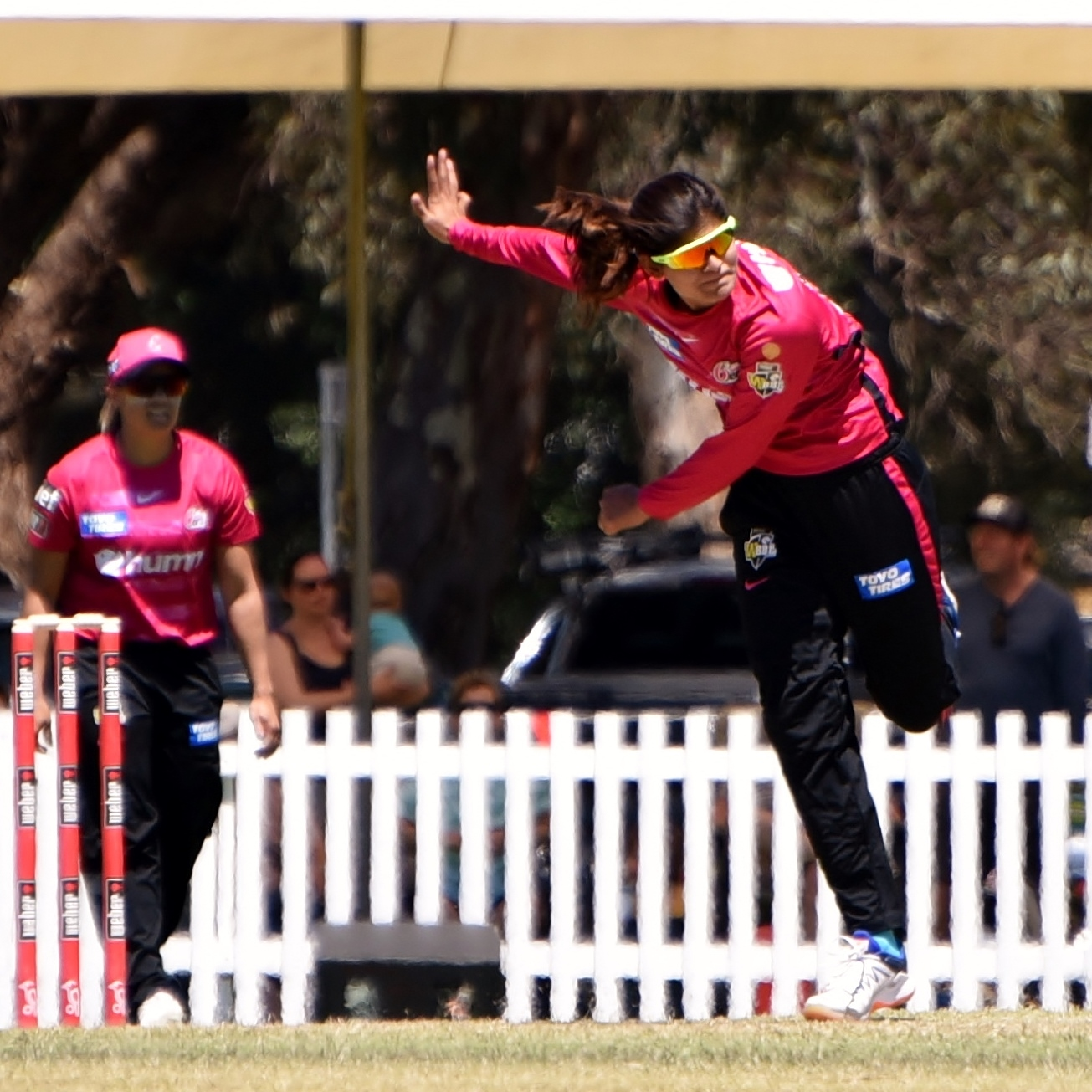
- Yadav bowling for Sydney Sixers during WBBL|07

Personal information
- Born: 21 April 2000 (age 26); Mumbai, Maharashtra, India
- Batting: Right-handed
- Bowling: Slow left-arm orthodox
- Role: Bowling all-rounder

International information
- National side: India (2018–present)
- ODI debut (cap 129): 14 March 2021 v South Africa
- Last ODI: 2 November 2025 v South Africa
- T20I debut (cap 58): 13 February 2018 v South Africa
- Last T20I: 23 February 2023 v Australia
- T20I shirt no.: 21

Domestic team information
- Years: Team
- 2014/15: Mumbai
- 2015/16–present: Baroda
- 2019–2020: Supernovas
- 2021/22: Sydney Sixers
- 2022: Velocity
- 2023–2025: Delhi Capitals
- 2025-present: Royal Challengers Bengaluru

Career statistics
Competition	WODI	WT20I
Matches	1	55
Runs scored	–	67
Batting average	–	5.58
100s/50s	–	0/0
Top score	–	14
Balls bowled	58	1,131
Wickets	0	62
Bowling average	–	19.79
5 wickets in innings	–	0
10 wickets in match	–	0
Best bowling	–	4/23
Catches/stumpings	0/-	16/-
Medal record
Women's cricket
Representing India
ICC Cricket World Cup
Winner	2025 India
ICC T20 World Cup
Runner-up	2020 Australia
Commonwealth Games
Silver medal – second place	2022 Birmingham
Asian Games
Gold medal – first place	Aichi–Nagoya 2026
ACC Asia Cup
Winner	2022 Bangladesh
Winner	2026 UAE
Runner-up	2024 Sri Lanka
- Source: ESPNcricinfo, 23 February 2023

Radha Yadav (born 21 April 2000) is an Indian cricketer. She plays for Mumbai, Baroda and West Zone. She made her debut in major domestic cricket on 10 January 2015 against Kerala.

== Early life ==
Yadav was born prematurely in Kandivli (West), Mumbai. She lived in a 225 sq. ft. house, behind her father's vegetable stall. Her father Omprakash Yadav originally from Jaunpur district of Uttar Pradesh. She started playing cricket in the society's compound with boys, where her coach, Prafful Naik, noticed her and has trained her since she was 12 years old. He shifted her from Anandibai Damodar Kale Vidyalaya to Our Lady of Remedy (Kandivali) in 2013. Later she went to Vidya Kunj School.

== Career ==
She made her Women's Twenty20 International cricket (WT20I) debut for India Women against South Africa Women on 13 February 2018.

In October 2018, she was named in India's squad for the 2018 ICC Women's World Twenty20 tournament in the West Indies. She was the joint-leading wicket-taker for India in the tournament, with eight dismissals in five matches.

In January 2020, she was named in India's squad for the 2020 ICC Women's T20 World Cup in Australia.

On November 9, 2020, during the final match of Women's T20 Challenge 2020, between Trailblazers Vs Supernovas, she became the first player in the Women's T20 Challenge to take a 5 wicket haul.

In February 2021, she was named in India's Women's One Day International (WODI) squad for their series against South Africa. She made her Women's One Day International (WODI) debut for India, against South Africa, on 14 March 2021.

In May 2021, she was named in India's Test squad for their one-off match against the England women's cricket team.

She played for Sydney Sixers in the 2021 Women's Big Bash League. In July 2022, she was named in India's team for the cricket tournament at the 2022 Commonwealth Games in Birmingham, England.

She was named in India's squad for the 2024 ICC Women's T20 World Cup and their home ODI series against New Zealand in October 2024.
