= Poonam Yadav =

Indian cricketer

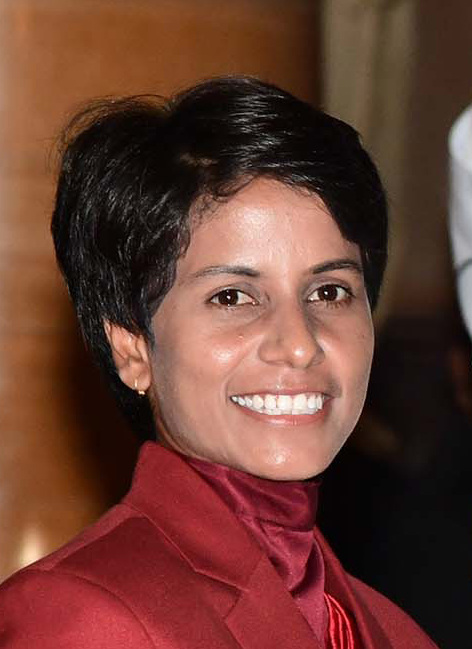

Personal information
- Born: 24 August 1991 (age 35); Mainpuri, Uttar Pradesh, India
- Batting: Right-handed
- Bowling: Right-arm leg-spin
- Role: Bowler

International information
- National side: India
- Only Test (cap 82): 16 November 2014 v South Africa
- ODI debut (cap 107): 12 April 2013 v Bangladesh
- Last ODI: 22 March 2022 v Bangladesh
- T20I debut (cap 41): 5 April 2013 v Bangladesh
- Last T20I: 9 February 2022 v New Zealand

Domestic team information
- Years: Team
- 2007/08–2013/14: Uttar Pradesh
- 2011/12–2017/18: India Red
- 2012/13–2016/17: Central Zone
- 2012/13–2018/19: India Blue
- 2014/15–present: Railways
- 2019–2020: Supernovas
- 2021/22: Brisbane Heat
- 2022: Trailblazers
- 2023: Delhi Capitals

Career statistics
Competition	WTest	WODI	WT20I
Matches	1	58	72
Runs scored	–	95	14
Batting average	–	7.91	2.80
100s/50s	–	0/0	0/0
Top score	–	15	4
Balls bowled	246	3,036	1,560
Wickets	3	80	98
Bowling average	22.66	25.15	15.25
5 wickets in innings	0	0	0
10 wickets in match	0	0	0
Best bowling	2/22	4/13	4/9
Catches/stumpings	0/-	13/-	15/-
- Source: ESPNcricinfo, 22 March 2022

Poonam Yadav (born 24 August 1991) is an Indian cricketer who plays for the national women's cricket team as a leg-spin bowler. She made her debut in International cricket on 5 April 2013 in a Women's Twenty20 International (WT20I) match against Bangladesh. Yadav's Test debut, on 16 November 2014, was against South Africa and her ODI debut, on 12 April 2013, was against Bangladesh.

== Early life ==
Yadav was born in Mainpuri, Uttar Pradesh, to Raghuveer Yadav, a retired army officer, and Munna Devi, a homemaker.

To pursue her career, Yadav had to shift to Agra from Mainpuri. There she trained at the Eklavya Sports Stadium. Three years later, Yadav almost quit cricket but was motivated by her father to continue further.

== International career ==
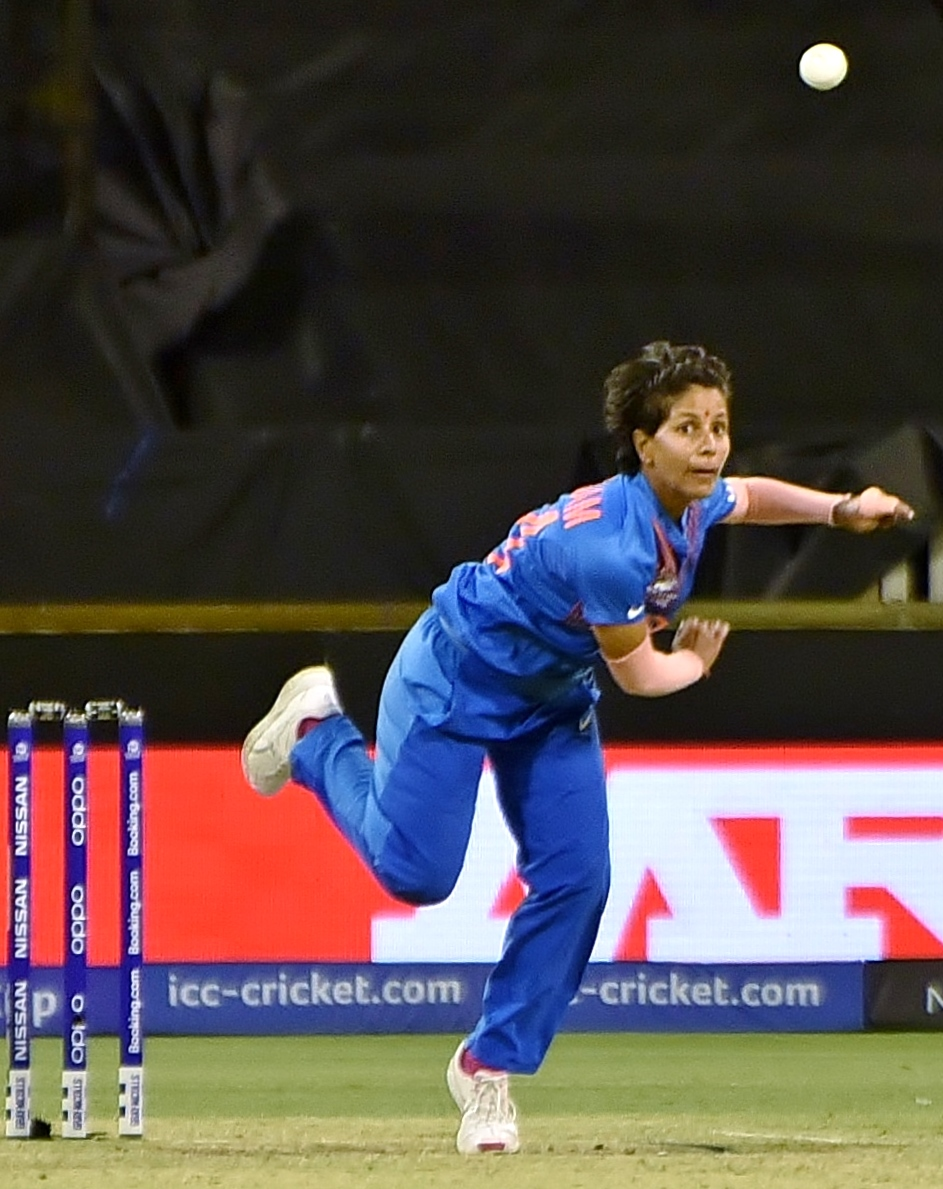
Yadav bowling for India against Bangladesh during the 2020 ICC Women's T20 World Cup

Yadav was part of the Indian team to reach the final of the 2017 Women's Cricket World Cup where the team lost to England by nine runs. In June 2018, she entered the top five of the women's T20I rankings and came in third on the list. In October 2018, she was named in India's squad for the 2018 ICC Women's World Twenty20 tournament in the West Indies. Ahead of the tournament, she was named as one of the players to watch. She was the joint-leading wicket-taker for India in the tournament, with eight dismissals in five matches. She became India's highest wicket-taker in Twenty20 Internationals in September 2018 with 57 wickets from 39 T20Is. She went past Jhulan Goswami's tally of 56 in the first T20I against Sri Lanka. She is also the only front-line bowler who has been in every T20 match for India in 2018.

In January 2020, she was named in India's squad for the 2020 ICC Women's T20 World Cup in Australia. India reached the final but lost to the hosts, with Yadav taking 1-30 (her solitary wicket being that of Rachael Haynes) and scoring 1 run before being last out to confirm Australia's victory. Her best bowling performance came in the opening game against the eventual champions Australia, where she wreaked havoc with figures of 4-0-19-4

In May 2021, she was named in India's Test squad for their one-off match against the England women's cricket team. In January 2022, she was named in India's team for the 2022 Women's Cricket World Cup in New Zealand.

== T20 Leagues ==
Poonam played for Supernovas in the Women's T20 Challenge in 2019 and 2022. She played for Brisbane Heat in the 2021–22 Women's Big Bash League.
