= Women's T20 Challenge =

Defunct cricket tournament that operated from 2018 to 2022

- Countries: India
- Administrator: Board of Control for Cricket in India
- Format: Twenty20
- First edition: 2018
- Latest edition: 2022
- Tournament format: Round-robin and final
- Number of teams: 3
- Current champion: Supernovas
- Most successful: Supernovas

The Women's T20 Challenge, commonly known as WT20 Challenge, was an Indian women's Twenty20 cricket tournament that was held between 2018 and 2022. The tournament featured three teams, playing a round-robin group followed by a final. Supernovas were the most successful team in the history of the tournament, with three title wins.

The tournament was replaced by a new franchise-based annual T20 tournament, the Women's Premier League, which began in 2023.

== History ==
The idea for a women's version of the Indian Premier League was suggested after the 2017 Women's Cricket World Cup, where the India women's national cricket team finished second. The tournament was first introduced in 2018, as a single match held in Mumbai prior to one of the men's matches. The match featured teams named Trailblazers and Supernovas.

In 2019, the Women's T20 Challenge was expanded to a three-team tournament instead of a one-off match, with a new team called Velocity competing alongside the Trailblazers and Supernovas, in a round-robin format with the top two teams progressing to the final.

The 2020 event was postponed due to the COVID-19 pandemic, and held in Sharjah, United Arab Emirates, alongside the rearranged men's IPL.

In November 2020, Board of Control for Cricket in India president Sourav Ganguly suggested an expansion of the Women's T20 Challenge to 7 or 8 teams in 2022. There were suggestions of adding a fourth team for the 2021 season, but this was decided against due to the ongoing issues caused by the COVID-19 pandemic.

The 2021 event was postponed along with the men's IPL, with no indication of a date for the women's event being played. It was not held at the same time as the rearranged men's event, as the dates clashed with India women's tour of Australia. In March 2022, the BCCI announced plans to start a women's IPL by 2023, with five or six teams in the inaugural edition. The 2022 event took place in May 2022, to coincide with the playoffs of the men's IPL.

In March 2022, BCCI announced a new franchise-based annual T20 tournament starting in 2023 to replace the Women's T20 Challenge, which was later named the Women's Premier League.

== Teams ==
Team	Wins	Runners-up
Supernovas	3	1
Trailblazers	1	1
Velocity	0	2

== Tournament results ==
In the inaugural edition, Supernovas won the match by 3 wickets in a last-over thriller. Supernovas beat Velocity by 4 wickets in the second edition and retained their title. In 2020, Trailblazers beat Supernovas by 16 runs in the third edition and won their maiden title. In 2022, Supernovas won their third title, beating Velocity by four runs in the final.

Season	Final			Final venue
Season	Winner	Result	Runner-up	Final venue
2018; Details	Supernovas; 130/7 (20 overs)	Supernovas won by 3 wickets	Trailblazers; 129/6 (20 overs)	Wankhede Stadium, Mumbai
2019; Details	Supernovas; 125/6 (20 overs)	Supernovas won by 4 wickets	Velocity; 121/6 (20 overs)	Sawai Mansingh Stadium, Jaipur
2020; Details	Trailblazers; 118/8 (20 overs)	Trailblazers won by 16 runs	Supernovas; 102/7 (20 overs)	Sharjah Cricket Stadium, Sharjah
2022; Details	Supernovas; 165/7 (20 overs)	Supernovas won by 4 runs	Velocity; 161/8 (20 overs)	Maharashtra Cricket Association Stadium, Pune

== See also ==
- Australian Women's Twenty20 Cup
- Women's Premier League
- Indian Premier League
