= New Zealand women's cricket team in England and Ireland in 2004 =

New Zealand women's cricket team in Ireland in 2004
	Ireland	New Zealand
- Dates: 22 – 24 July 2004
Captains	Clare Shillington	Maia Lewis

One Day International series
- Results: New Zealand won the 3-match series 3–0
Most runs	Isobel Joyce (85)	Helen Watson (121)
Most wickets	Barbara McDonald (5)	Amanda Green (7)

The New Zealand women's national cricket team toured Ireland and England in July and August 2004. They first played Ireland in 3 One Day Internationals, winning the series 3–0. They then played England in the first ever Twenty20 International for either gender, with New Zealand winning the match by 9 runs. Finally, they played England in 5 ODIs and 1 Test match, with England winning the ODI series 3–2 and the Test match ending as a draw.

== Tour of Ireland ==
=== Squads ===
Ireland	New Zealand
Clare Shillington (c); Emma Beamish; Caitriona Beggs; Una Budd; Jo Day (wk); Miriam Grealey; Marianne Herbert; Cecelia Joyce; Isobel Joyce; Anne Linehan (wk); Barbara McDonald; Ciara Metcalfe; Heather Whelan; Jill Whelan	Maia Lewis (c); Nicola Browne; Sarah Burke; Maria Fahey; Paula Flannery; Amanda Green; Amber Little; Sara McGlashan; Beth McNeill; Louise Milliken; Rebecca Rolls (wk); Rebecca Steele; Haidee Tiffen; Aimee Watkins; Helen Watson

=== WODI Series ===
==== 1st ODI ====
22 July 2004
Scorecard

New Zealand; 278/3 (50 overs)	v	Ireland; 78 (36.1 overs)
Maria Fahey 66 (95); Miriam Grealey 2/38 (10 overs)		Caitriona Beggs 21 (88); Louise Milliken 3/14 (8 overs)

New Zealand Women won by 200 runs
Trinity College, Dublin
Umpires: Alan Tuffery (Ire) and Martin Russell (Ire)
Player of the match: Rebecca Rolls (NZ)

- New Zealand Women won the toss and elected to bat.
- Jo Day and Jill Whelan (Ire) both made their WODI debuts.

==== 2nd ODI ====
24 July 2004
Scorecard

New Zealand; 272/5 (50 overs)	v	Ireland; 160 (44.3 overs)
Beth McNeill 88* (101); Barbara McDonald 2/33 (10 overs)		Isobel Joyce 67* (110); Amanda Green 5/15 (9.3 overs)

New Zealand Women won by 112 runs
Anglesea Road Cricket Ground, Dublin
Umpires: C Colleray (Ire) and Nigel Parnell (Ire)
Player of the match: Beth McNeill (NZ)

- Ireland Women won the toss and elected to field.

==== 3rd ODI ====
25 July 2004
Scorecard

New Zealand; 232/7 (50 overs)	v	Ireland; 155 (45.1 overs)
Helen Watson 115* (114); Barbara McDonald 3/29 (10 overs)		Cecelia Joyce 33 (99); Louise Milliken 3/39 (8 overs)

New Zealand Women won by 77 runs
Anglesea Road Cricket Ground, Dublin
Umpires: Gerry Lyons (Ire) and John Bristow (Ire)
Player of the match: Helen Watson (NZ)

- New Zealand Women won the toss and elected to bat.

== Tour of England ==
New Zealand women's cricket team in England in 2004
	England	New Zealand
- Dates: 8 – 30 August 2004
Captains	Clare Connor	Maia Lewis

Test series
- Result: 1-match series drawn 0–0
Most runs	Charlotte Edwards (117)	Maia Lewis (77)
Most wickets	Isa Guha (3); Katherine Brunt (3)	Rebecca Steele (3)

One Day International series
- Results: England won the 5-match series 3–2
Most runs	Charlotte Edwards (134)	Haidee Tiffen (125)
Most wickets	Isa Guha (10)	Louise Milliken (8); Rebecca Steele (8)

Twenty20 International series
- Results: New Zealand won the 1-match series 1–0
Most runs	Claire Taylor (43)	Rebecca Rolls (39)
Most wickets	Rosalie Birch (4)	Aimee Watkins (3)

=== Squads ===
England	New Zealand
Clare Connor (c); Rosalie Birch; Arran Brindle; Katherine Brunt; Charlotte Edwards; Lydia Greenway; Isa Guha; Jenny Gunn; Dawn Holden; Laura Newton; Lucy Pearson; Nicky Shaw; Jane Smit (wk); Laura Spragg; Claire Taylor; Clare Taylor	Maia Lewis (c); Nicola Browne; Sarah Burke; Maria Fahey; Paula Flannery; Amanda Green; Amber Little; Sara McGlashan; Beth McNeill; Louise Milliken; Rebecca Rolls (wk); Rebecca Steele; Haidee Tiffen; Aimee Watkins; Helen Watson

=== Tour Matches ===
==== 20-over match: Sussex v New Zealand ====
29 July 2004

New Zealand; 153/6 (20 overs)	v	Sussex; 106/7 (20 overs)

New Zealand Women won by 47 runs
Fenner's, Cambridge

- Sussex Women won the toss and elected to field.
- Full scorecard unavailable. Match summary from Wisden Cricketer's Almanac.

==== 50-over match: Marylebone Cricket Club v New Zealand ====
30 July 2004
Scorecard

New Zealand; 279/7 (50 overs)	v	Marylebone Cricket Club; 151/7 (50 overs)
Maria Fahey 87 (–); Debra Stock 3/18 (4 overs)		Laura Boorman 30* (–); Sarah Burke 2/29 (10 overs)

New Zealand Women won by 128 runs
Fenner's, Cambridge
Umpires: John Hayes (Eng) and David Murphy (Eng)

- Marylebone Cricket Club Women won the toss and elected to field.

==== 50-over match: England Development Squad v New Zealand ====
2 August 2004
Scorecard

England Development Squad; 222/4 (50 overs)	v	New Zealand; 225/5 (46 overs)
Arran Brindle 123 (165); Amanda Green 2/34 (9 overs)		Sara McGlashan 100* (110); Helen Wardlaw 1/10 (2 overs)

New Zealand Women won by 5 wickets
Horsham Cricket Club, Horsham
Umpires: Lorraine Elgar (Eng) and John Hayes (Eng)

- England Development Squad Women won the toss and elected to bat.

==== 50-over match: England Development Squad v New Zealand ====
3 August 2004
Scorecard

New Zealand; 228/7 (50 overs)	v	England Development Squad; 111 (45.5 overs)
Maia Lewis 52 (96); Nicky Myers 3/32 (10 overs)		Salliann Briggs 17 (34); Helen Watson 3/9 (10 overs)

New Zealand Women won by 117 runs
Horsham Cricket Club, Horsham
Umpires: Lorraine Elgar (Eng) and John Hayes (Eng)

- England Development Squad Women won the toss and elected to field.

=== Only T20I ===
5 August 2004
Scorecard

New Zealand; 131/8 (20 overs)	v	England; 122/7 (20 overs)
Rebecca Rolls 39 (32); Rosalie Birch 4/27 (4 overs)		Claire Taylor 43 (33); Aimee Watkins 3/27 (4 overs)

New Zealand Women won by 9 runs
County Ground, Hove
Umpires: Lorraine Elgar (Eng) and Roy Palmer (Eng)
Player of the match: Rebecca Rolls (NZ)

- New Zealand Women won the toss and elected to bat.
- Rosalie Birch, Clare Connor, Charlotte Edwards, Lydia Greenway, Isa Guha, Jenny Gunn, Laura Newton, Lucy Pearson, Nicky Shaw, Jane Smit, Claire Taylor (Eng), Nicola Browne, Sarah Burke, Paula Flannery, Amanda Green, Maia Lewis, Sara McGlashan, Rebecca Rolls, Rebecca Steele, Haidee Tiffen, Aimee Watkins and Helen Watson (NZ) all made their WT20I debuts.

=== WODI Series ===
==== 1st ODI ====
6 August 2004
Scorecard

England; 221/9 (50 overs)	v	New Zealand; 176 (46.5 overs)
Laura Newton 57 (90); Louise Milliken 2/21 (8 overs)		Maria Fahey 64 (120); Lucy Pearson 3/33 (10 overs)

England Women won by 45 runs
County Ground, Hove
Umpires: John Steele (Eng) and Lorraine Elgar (Eng)
Player of the match: Rosalie Birch (Eng)

- England Women won the toss and elected to bat.

==== 2nd ODI ====
10 August 2004
Scorecard

New Zealand; 126 (46.2 overs)	v	England; 127/3 (36 overs)
Maia Lewis 28 (62); Jenny Gunn 4/26 (10 overs)		Clare Connor 28* (56); Haidee Tiffen 1/10 (3 overs)

England Women won by 7 wickets
County Ground, Chelmsford
Umpires: Graham Cooper (Eng) and Neil Bainton (Eng)
Player of the match: Jenny Gunn (Eng)

- New Zealand Women won the toss and elected to bat.

==== 3rd ODI ====
13 August 2004
Scorecard

England; 144/9 (50 overs)	v	New Zealand; 147/5 (48.3 overs)
Rosalie Birch 46* (79); Rebecca Steele 3/10 (10 overs)		Rebecca Rolls 42 (78); Isa Guha 2/28 (10 overs)

New Zealand Women won by 5 wickets
County Ground, Northampton
Umpires: Annette Owen (Eng) and Rob Bailey (Eng)
Player of the match: Rebecca Steele (NZ)

- England Women won the toss and elected to bat.

==== 4th ODI ====
15 August 2004
Scorecard

England; 197/7 (50 overs)	v	New Zealand; 159/9 (50 overs)
Charlotte Edwards 70 (108); Amanda Green 1/31 (9 overs)		Haidee Tiffen 48 (86); Isa Guha 5/22 (10 overs)

England Women won by 38 runs
County Ground, Derby
Umpires: Annette Owen (Eng) and Richard Kettleborough (Eng)
Player of the match: Charlotte Edwards (Eng)

- New Zealand Women won the toss and elected to field.

==== 5th ODI ====
17 August 2004
Scorecard

New Zealand; 141/8 (46 overs)	v	England; 129 (41 overs)
Haidee Tiffen 35 (71); Rosalie Birch 1/10 (3 overs)		Arran Brindle 34* (79); Rebecca Steele 3/14 (10 overs)

New Zealand Women won by 18 runs (D/L)
Old Trafford Cricket Ground, Manchester
Umpires: Ann Roberts (Eng) and Barry Dudleston (Eng)
Player of the match: Rebecca Steele (NZ)

- New Zealand Women won the toss and elected to field.
- Match reduced to 46 overs per side due to rain.

=== Only Test ===
21 – 24 August 2004
Scorecard

New Zealand	v	England
215 (94 overs); Rebecca Rolls 71 (116); Jenny Gunn 2/18 (9 overs)		285 (99 overs); Charlotte Edwards 117 (251); Rebecca Steele 3/62 (29 overs)
149/3 (58.1 overs); Maia Lewis 60 (112); Katherine Brunt 2/36 (10 overs)

Match drawn
North Marine Road Ground, Scarborough
Umpires: Ann Roberts (Eng) and Steve Garratt (Eng)
Player of the match: Laura Newton (Eng)

- England Women won the toss and elected to field.
- Katherine Brunt, Jenny Gunn (Eng), Sarah Burke, Paula Flannery and Rebecca Rolls (NZ) all made their WTest debuts.
