= 2003–04 Rose Bowl series =

2003–04 Rose Bowl
	New Zealand	Australia
- Dates: 11 – 27 February 2004
Captains	Maia Lewis	Belinda Clark

One Day International series
- Results: New Zealand won the 6-match series 5–1
Most runs	Haidee Tiffen (195)	Karen Rolton (394)
Most wickets	Beth McNeill (5); Louise Milliken (5)	Cathryn Fitzpatrick (15)
- Player of the series: Karen Rolton (Aus)

The 2003–04 Rose Bowl series was a women's cricket series held in New Zealand and Australia in February 2004. New Zealand and Australia played each other in six One Day Internationals, three in each country. Australia won the series 5–1.

== Squads ==
New Zealand	Australia
Maia Lewis (c); Nicola Browne; Sarah Burke; Emily Drumm; Maria Fahey; Amanda Green; Beth McNeill; Louise Milliken; Rebecca Rolls (wk); Rebecca Steele; Haidee Tiffen; Aimee Watkins; Helen Watson	Belinda Clark (c); Alex Blackwell; Kris Britt; Leonie Coleman (wk); Shannon Cunneen (wk); Julie Hayes; Cathryn Fitzpatrick; Mel Jones; Lisa Keightley; Karen Rolton; Clea Smith; Lisa Sthalekar

== Australia in New Zealand ==
=== 1st ODI ===
11 February 2004
Scorecard

Australia; 225/4 (50 overs)	v	New Zealand; 147 (46 overs)
Karen Rolton 102* (133); Sarah Burke 1/38 (10 overs)		Haidee Tiffen 39 (74); Cathryn Fitzpatrick 4/11 (8 overs)

Australia Women won by 78 runs
Eden Park Outer Oval, Auckland
Umpires: Doug Cowie (NZ) and Phil Jones (NZ)

- Australia Women won the toss and elected to bat.
- Leonie Coleman and Shannon Cunneen (Aus) both made their WODI debuts.

=== 2nd ODI ===
15 February 2004
Scorecard

New Zealand; 152/8 (50 overs)	v	Australia; 153/2 (38.5 overs)
Maia Lewis 30 (70); Cathryn Fitzpatrick 3/35 (10 overs)		Karen Rolton 60* (108); Nicola Browne 1/13 (4 overs)

Australia Women won by 8 wickets
Seddon Park, Hamilton
Umpires: Dave Quested (NZ) and Kathy Cross (NZ)

- New Zealand Women won the toss and elected to bat.
- Beth McNeill (NZ) made her WODI debut.

=== 3rd ODI ===
17 February 2004
Scorecard

Australia; 241/3 (50 overs)	v	New Zealand; 158/8 (50 overs)
Belinda Clark 120 (148); Beth McNeill 2/42 (9 overs)		Emily Drumm 28 (56); Karen Rolton 2/22 (6 overs)

Australia Women won by 83 runs
Seddon Park, Hamilton
Umpires: Dave Quested (NZ) and Kathy Cross (NZ)

- New Zealand Women won the toss and elected to field.

== New Zealand in Australia ==
=== 4th ODI ===
21 February 2004
Scorecard

New Zealand; 151/6 (50 overs)	v	Australia; 131 (46.4 overs)
Haidee Tiffen 52* (89); Cathryn Fitzpatrick 3/35 (10 overs)		Karen Rolton 26 (39); Helen Watson 2/19 (6.4 overs)

New Zealand Women won by 20 runs
Bankstown Oval, Sydney
Umpires: Rod Tucker (Aus) and Shane Reed (Aus)

- New Zealand Women won the toss and elected to bat.

=== 5th ODI ===
25 February 2004
Scorecard

Australia; 239/5 (50 overs)	v	New Zealand; 199/7 (50 overs)
Karen Rolton 95* (108); Rebecca Steele 2/27 (10 overs)		Haidee Tiffen 44 (61); Julie Hayes 4/31 (10 overs)

Australia Women won by 40 runs
Albert Cricket Ground, Melbourne
Umpires: Paul Reiffel (Aus) and Tony Soulsby (Aus)

- Australia Women won the toss and elected to bat.

=== 6th ODI ===
27 February 2004
Scorecard

New Zealand; 196/6 (50 overs)	v	Australia; 197/6 (48.4 overs)
Haidee Tiffen 60* (83); Karen Rolton 2/36 (7 overs)		Mel Jones 54 (55); Rebecca Steele 1/23 (10 overs)

Australia Women won by 4 wickets
Bellerive Oval, Hobart
Umpires: Barry Jackman (Aus) and Ken McGinniss (Aus)

- New Zealand Women won the toss and elected to bat.
