= New Zealand women's cricket team in India in 2003–04 =

| | India | New Zealand |
- Dates: 23 November – 16 December 2003
| Captains | Mamatha Maben | Maia Lewis |

Test series
- Result: 1-match series drawn 0–0
| Most runs | Hemlata Kala (110) | Haidee Tiffen (84) |
| Most wickets | Neetu David (6) | Rebecca Steele (5) |

One Day International series
- Results: India won the 5-match series 4–1
| Most runs | Jaya Sharma (309) | Maria Fahey (209) |
| Most wickets | Deepa Marathe (8) | Aimee Watkins (5) |
- Player of the series: Jaya Sharma (Ind)

The New Zealand women's national cricket team toured India in November and December 2003. They played India in one Test match and five One Day Internationals, drawing the Test and losing the ODI series 4–1.

== Squads ==
| India | New Zealand |
|---|---|
| Mamatha Maben (c); Nooshin Al Khadeer; Anjum Chopra; Neetu David; Jhulan Goswami; Anju Jain (wk); Hemlata Kala; Mamatha Kanojia; Arundhati Kirkire; Deepa Marathe; Sunetra Paranjpe; Mithali Raj; Beas Sarkar; Amita Sharma; Jaya Sharma | Maia Lewis (c); Nicola Browne; Anna Dodd; Maria Fahey; Amanda Green; Michelle Lynch; Katey Martin (wk); Sara McGlashan (wk); Louise Milliken; Kate Pulford; Natalee Scripps; Rebecca Steele; Haidee Tiffen; Aimee Watkins |

== Tour Matches ==
=== 2-day match: Women's Cricket Association of India v New Zealand ===
23 – 24 November 2003
Scorecard

| Women's Cricket Association of India | v | New Zealand |
| 108 (72.3 overs); Mamatha Maben 38 (144); Natalee Scripps 3/8 (6 overs) | | 322/8 (95 overs); Maia Lewis 129 (173); Babusha Singh 3/39 (13.5 overs) |

Match drawn
Middle Income Group Club Ground, Mumbai

- New Zealand Women won the toss and elected to field.

=== 50-over match: Women's Cricket Association of India President's XI v New Zealand ===
2 December 2003
Scorecard

| New Zealand; 217/8 (50 overs) | v | Women's Cricket Association of India President's XI; 79 (29.2 overs) |
| Sara McGlashan 80 (120); Chandarani Kamble 2/25 (7 overs) | | Arundhati Kirkire 27 (54); Aimee Watkins 4/16 (9 overs) |

New Zealand Women won by 138 runs
Wankhede Stadium, Mumbai
Umpires: ES Robbin (Ind) and JC Umrigar (Ind)

- Women's Cricket Association of India President's XI won the toss and elected to field.

== Only WTest ==
27 – 30 November 2003
Scorecard

| New Zealand | v | India |
| 201/9d (109.5 overs); Haidee Tiffen 66* (252); Neetu David 3/43 (31.5 overs) | | 277 (144.3 overs); Hemlata Kala 110 (280); Rebecca Steele 5/79 (42 overs) |
| 102/4 (99 overs); Maria Fahey 60* (303) |

Match drawn
Bilakhiya Stadium, Vapi
Umpires: Adil Palia (Ind) and Darabshah Doodhwala (Ind)
Player of the match: Hemlata Kala (Ind)

- India Women won the toss and elected to field.
- Nooshin Al Khadeer, Amita Sharma (Ind), Nicola Browne, Maria Fahey, Katey Martin, Sara McGlashan, Louise Milliken, Kate Pulford, Natalee Scripps, Rebecca Steele, Haidee Tiffen and Aimee Watkins (NZ) all made their WTest debuts.

== WODI Series ==
=== 1st ODI ===
4 December 2003
Scorecard

| New Zealand; 191/6 (50 overs) | v | India; 192/5 (48.1 overs) |
| Haidee Tiffen 57 (84); Mamatha Maben 2/38 (10 overs) | | Jaya Sharma 60 (89); Aimee Watkins 2/30 (10 overs) |

India Women won by 5 wickets
Brabourne Stadium, Mumbai
Umpires: Borni Jamula (Ind) and Suresh Shastri (Ind)
Player of the match: Jaya Sharma (Ind)

- New Zealand Women won the toss and elected to bat.
- Maria Fahey, Katey Martin and Natalee Scripps (NZ) all made their WODI debuts.

=== 2nd ODI ===
7 December 2003
Scorecard

| New Zealand; 207/7 (50 overs) | v | India; 211/1 (47.5 overs) |
| Maia Lewis 47 (77); Nooshin Al Khadeer 2/30 (10 overs) | | Jaya Sharma 96* (152); Rebecca Steele 1/27 (10 overs) |

India Women won by 9 wickets
Aurangabad District Cricket Association Stadium, Aurangabad
Umpires: M. R. Singh (Ind) and Suresh Shastri (Ind)
Player of the match: Jaya Sharma (Ind)

- India Women won the toss and elected to field.

=== 3rd ODI ===
10 December 2003
Scorecard

| India; 211/4 (50 overs) | v | New Zealand; 206/7 (50 overs) |
| Mithali Raj 59 (68); Louise Milliken 1/42 (10 overs) | | Haidee Tiffen 56 (77); Deepa Marathe 3/37 (10 overs) |

India Women won by 5 runs
M. Chinnaswamy Stadium, Bangalore
Umpires: C. K. Nandan (Ind) and Shavir Tarapore (Ind)
Player of the match: Mithali Raj (Ind)

- New Zealand Women won the toss and elected to field.

=== 4th ODI ===
13 December 2003
Scorecard

| New Zealand; 213/5 (50 overs) | v | India; 216/6 (49.2 overs) |
| Maria Fahey 91 (134); Mamatha Kanojia 3/48 (10 overs) | | Anjum Chopra 59 (100); Aimee Watkins 2/40 (9 overs) |

India Women won by 4 wickets
Lal Bahadur Shastri Stadium, Hyderabad
Umpires: Chandra Kumar (Ind) and O. Krishna (Ind)
Player of the match: Mithali Raj (Ind)

- India Women won the toss and elected to field.

=== 5th ODI ===
16 December 2003
Scorecard

| India; 186/5 (50 overs) | v | New Zealand; 187/8 (50 overs) |
| Jaya Sharma 59 (101); Anna Dodd 3/39 (10 overs) | | Maria Fahey 66 (113); Deepa Marathe 4/34 (10 overs) |

New Zealand Women won by 2 wickets
Chemplast Cricket Ground, Chennai
Umpires: G. A. Pratapkumar (Ind) and S. Balachandran (Ind)
Player of the match: Maria Fahey (NZ)

- New Zealand Women won the toss and elected to field.
- Beas Sarkar (Ind) made her WODI debut.
