= New Zealand women's cricket team in Australia in 2004–05 =

	Australia	New Zealand
- Dates: 10 – 13 March 2005
Captains	Belinda Clark	Maia Lewis

One Day International series
- Results: Australia won the 3-match series 3–0
Most runs	Belinda Clark (127)	Haidee Tiffen (91)
Most wickets	Emma Liddell (5)	Helen Watson (4)

The New Zealand women's national cricket team toured Australia in March 2005. They played against Australia in three One Day Internationals, which were to contest the Rose Bowl. Australia won the series 3–0.

== Squads ==
Australia	New Zealand
Belinda Clark (c); Alex Blackwell; Kate Blackwell; Louise Broadfoot; Cathryn Fitzpatrick; Julie Hayes; Mel Jones; Lisa Keightley; Emma Liddell; Shelley Nitschke; Julia Price (wk); Karen Rolton; Clea Smith; Lisa Sthalekar	Maia Lewis (c); Nicola Browne; Sarah Burke; Anna Dodd; Maria Fahey; Sara McGlashan; Louise Milliken; Rachel Pullar; Rebecca Rolls (wk); Natalee Scripps; Rebecca Steele; Haidee Tiffen; Helen Watson

== WODI Series ==
=== 1st ODI ===
10 March 2005
Scorecard

Australia; 207/8 (50 overs)	v	New Zealand; 120 (46 overs)
Belinda Clark 86 (114); Nicola Browne 2/37 (9 overs)		Nicola Browne 29* (42); Karen Rolton 2/16 (6 overs)

Australia Women won by 87 runs
Lilac Hill Park, Perth
Umpires: Andrew Craig (Aus) and Bruce Bennett (Aus)

- Australia Women won the toss and elected to bat.

=== 2nd ODI ===
12 March 2005
Scorecard

New Zealand; 202/7 (50 overs)	v	Australia; 195/8 (50 overs)
Belinda Clark 38 (59); Rebecca Steele 1/26 (10 overs)		Haidee Tiffen 91 (127); Julie Hayes 2/24 (10 overs)

Australia Women won by 7 runs
WACA Ground, Perth
Umpires: Andrew Craig (Aus) and Jeff Brookes (Aus)

- Australia Women won the toss and elected to bat.

=== 3rd ODI ===
13 March 2005 (D/N)
Scorecard

New Zealand; 114/9 (50 overs)	v	Australia; 118/7 (45.3 overs)
Nicola Browne 30 (83); Emma Liddell 4/17 (9 overs)		Karen Rolton 43 (60); Helen Watson 3/14 (7 overs)

Australia Women won by 3 wickets
WACA Ground, Perth
Umpires: Andrew Craig (Aus) and Jeff Brookes (Aus)

- Australia Women won the toss and elected to field.
