= New Zealand women's cricket team in Australia in 2007 =

	Australia	New Zealand
- Dates: 19 – 29 July 2007
Captains	Karen Rolton	Haidee Tiffen

One Day International series
- Results: Australia won the 5-match series 3–2
Most runs	Karen Rolton (163); Melissa Bulow (163)	Nicola Browne (159)
Most wickets	Sarah Andrews (9)	Sarah Tsukigawa (10)
- Player of the series: Nicola Browne (NZ)

Twenty20 International series
- Results: Australia won the 1-match series 1–0
Most runs	Kris Britt (39)	Amy Satterthwaite (25)
Most wickets	Lisa Sthalekar (2); Emma Sampson (2)	Nicola Browne (3)

The New Zealand women's national cricket team toured Australia in July 2007. They first played against Australia in one Twenty20 International, which Australia won by one run. The two sides then played in five One Day Internationals, which were to contest the Rose Bowl. Australia won the series 3–2.

== Squads ==
Australia	New Zealand
Karen Rolton (c); Sarah Andrews; Alex Blackwell; Kate Blackwell; Kris Britt; Melissa Bulow; Sarah Elliott; Rene Farrell; Jodie Fields (wk); Shelley Nitschke; Ellyse Perry; Emma Sampson; Clea Smith; Lisa Sthalekar	Haidee Tiffen (c); Nicola Browne; Sarah Burke; Sophie Devine; Maria Fahey; Sara McGlashan; Beth McNeill; Rowan Milburn (wk); Louise Milliken (withdrawn); Rachel Priest (wk); Amy Satterthwaite; Sarah Tsukigawa; Aimee Watkins; Helen Watson

== Only WT20I ==
19 July 2007
Scorecard

Australia; 108/9 (20 overs)	v	New Zealand; 107/7 (20 overs)
Kris Britt 39 (36); Nicola Browne 3/14 (3 overs)		Amy Satterthwaite 25 (18); Lisa Sthalekar 2/15 (4 overs)

Australia Women won by 1 run
Gardens Oval, Darwin
Umpires: Ian Lock (Aus) and John Ward (Aus)
Player of the match: Nicola Browne (NZ)

- New Zealand Women won the toss and elected to field.
- Kris Britt, Emma Sampson, Clea Smith (Aus), Beth McNeill, Rachel Priest and Amy Satterthwaite (NZ) all made their WT20I debuts.

== WODI Series ==
=== 1st ODI ===
21 July 2007
Scorecard

New Zealand; 132 (46.4 overs)	v	Australia; 133/3 (33 overs)
Sarah Tsukigawa 31 (58); Clea Smith 2/15 (10 overs)		Lisa Sthalekar 45* (57); Beth McNeill 1/14 (5 overs)

Australia Women won by 1 run
Gardens Oval, Darwin
Umpires: Ian Lock (Aus) and John Ward (Aus)

- New Zealand Women won the toss and elected to bat.
- Amy Satterthwaite (NZ) made her WODI debut.

=== 2nd ODI ===
22 July 2007
Scorecard

New Zealand; 209 (50 overs)	v	Australia; 174 (45.5 overs)
Aimee Watkins 102 (128); Emma Sampson 2/23 (8 overs)		Karen Rolton 27 (64); Aimee Watkins 3/15 (10 overs)

New Zealand Women won by 35 runs
Gardens Oval, Darwin
Umpires: Ian Lock (Aus) and John Ward (Aus)

- New Zealand Women won the toss and elected to bat.
- Ellyse Perry (Aus) made her WODI debut.

=== 3rd ODI ===
25 July 2007

New Zealand; 187/8 (50 overs)	v	Australia; 188/4 (45.5 overs)
Nicola Browne 50* (81); Sarah Andrews 3/23 (10 overs)		Melissa Bulow 51 (93); Nicola Browne 2/27 (5 overs)

Australia Women won by 6 wickets
Gardens Oval, Darwin
Umpires: Ian Lock (Aus) and John Ward (Aus)

- New Zealand Women won the toss and elected to bat.
- Rachel Priest (NZ) made her WODI debut.

=== 4th ODI ===
28 July 2007
Scorecard

Australia; 198/7 (50 overs)	v	New Zealand; 196/9 (50 overs)
Karen Rolton 81* (131); Sarah Tsukigawa 4/43 (10 overs)		Nicola Browne 61 (76); Rene Farrell 3/36 (9 overs)

Australia Women won by 2 runs
Gardens Oval, Darwin
Umpires: Ian Lock (Aus) and John Ward (Aus)

- New Zealand Women won the toss and elected to field.
- Rene Farrell (Aus) made her WODI debut.

=== 5th ODI ===
29 July 2007
Scorecard

Australia; 180/9 (50 overs)	v	New Zealand; 183/6 (44.5 overs)
Melissa Bulow 51 (90); Sophie Devine 2/21 (10 overs)		Haidee Tiffen 66* (95); Sarah Andrews 2/29 (9 overs)

New Zealand Women won by 4 wickets
Gardens Oval, Darwin
Umpires: Ian Lock (Aus) and John Ward (Aus)

- Australia Women won the toss and elected to bat.
