= 2006–07 ICC Women's Quadrangular Series =

Women's cricket tournament

- Dates: 21 February – 5 March 2007
- Administrator: BCCI
- Cricket format: ODI (50 overs)
- Host: India
- Champions: Australia
- Runners-up: New Zealand
- Participants: 4
- Matches: 14
- Player of the series: Lisa Sthalekar (Aus)
- Most runs: Lisa Sthalekar (394)
- Most wickets: Kirsten Pike (14)

The 2006–07 ICC Women's Quadrangular Series was a Women's One Day International cricket tournament that took place in India in February and March 2007. Four teams competed: Australia, England, India and New Zealand. The tournament consisted of a double round-robin group stage, in which Australia and New Zealand finished as the top two, and then a third-place play-off and a final were contested to decide the final positions. Australia defeated New Zealand by 6 wickets in the final. All of the matches took place in Chennai, at the IIT Chemplast Ground and the MA Chidambaram Stadium.

== Squads ==
Australia	England	India	New Zealand
Karen Rolton (c); Sarah Andrews; Alex Blackwell; Kate Blackwell; Melissa Bulow; Sarah Edwards; Cathryn Fitzpatrick; Shelley Nitschke; Kirsten Pike; Leah Poulton; Jodie Purves; Emma Sampson; Clea Smith; Lisa Sthalekar	Charlotte Edwards (c); Lynsey Askew; Caroline Atkins; Holly Colvin; Lydia Greenway; Isa Guha; Jenny Gunn; Laura Marsh; Beth Morgan; Laura Newton; Ebony Rainford-Brent; Jane Smit; Claire Taylor; Sarah Taylor	Mithali Raj (c); Nooshin Al Khadeer; Anjum Chopra; Rumeli Dhar; Preeti Dimri; Jhulan Goswami; Karu Jain; Hemlata Kala; Thirush Kamini; Devika Palshikar; Sunetra Paranjpe; Rajeshwari Goyal; Amita Sharma; Jaya Sharma	Haidee Tiffen (c); Suzie Bates; Nicola Browne; Sarah Burke; Selena Charteris; Sophie Devine; Maria Fahey; Sara McGlashan; Aimee Mason; Rowan Milburn; Louise Milliken; Rebecca Rolls; Sarah Tsukigawa; Helen Watson

== Tournament format ==
The four teams competing in the series played each other twice in a double round-robin format, with the top two progressing to the final and bottom two playing off in a third-place play-off. Matches were playing using a One Day International format with 50 overs per side.

The group worked on a points system with positions within the groups being based on the total points. Points were awarded as follows:

Win: 4 points.
Tie: 2 points.
Loss: 0 points.
No Result/Abandoned: 2 points.
Bonus: 1 point available per match.

If the team batting first won the match and restricted their opponent to 80% of their total, they received a bonus point. If the team batting second won the match in 40 overs, they received a bonus point.

If points in the final table are equal, teams are separated by most wins, then head-to-head record, then number of bonus points, then Net Run Rate.

== Points table ==
ICC Women's Quadrangular Series
Pos	Team	Pld	W	L	T	NR	BP	Pts	NRR
1	New Zealand (Q)	6	5	1	0	0	1	21	0.432
2	Australia (Q)	6	4	2	0	0	2	18	0.293
3	India	6	3	3	0	0	1	13	−0.111
4	England	6	0	6	0	0	0	0	−0.647

Source: ESPNcricinfo

== Fixtures ==
=== Group stage ===
21 February 2007
Scorecard

Australia; 260/9 (50 overs)	v	New Zealand; 261/4 (45 overs)
Lisa Sthalekar 65 (76); Helen Watson 3/30 (10 overs)		Rebecca Rolls 104* (87); Shelley Nitschke 1/35 (7 overs)

New Zealand Women won by 6 wickets
IIT Chemplast Ground, Chennai
Umpires: Krishnamachari Srinivasan (Ind) and SM Raju (Ind)
Player of the match: Rebecca Rolls (NZ)

- Australia Women won the toss and elected to bat.
- Emma Sampson (Aus) made her WODI debut.
- Points: New Zealand Women 4, Australia Women 0

21 February 2007
Scorecard

India; 231/6 (50 overs)	v	England; 213 (48 overs)
Karu Jain 77 (119); Isa Guha 2/49 (10 overs)		Caroline Atkins 54 (99); Jhulan Goswami 2/25 (10 overs)

India Women won by 18 runs
MA Chidambaram Stadium, Chennai
Umpires: GA Pratapkumar (Ind) and R Radhakrishnan (Ind)
Player of the match: Karu Jain (Ind)

- England Women won the toss and elected to field.
- Points: India Women 4, England Women 0

23 February 2007
Scorecard

Australia; 213/8 (50 overs)	v	India; 215/7 (49 overs)
Lisa Sthalekar 87* (111); Preeti Dimri 3/46 (10 overs)		Jaya Sharma 104* (140); Kirsten Pike 2/47 (10 overs)

India Women won by 3 wickets
MA Chidambaram Stadium, Chennai
Umpires: KG Lakshminarayan (Ind) and R Radhakrishnan (Ind)
Player of the match: Jaya Sharma (Ind)

- Australia Women won the toss and elected to bat.
- Points: India Women 4, Australia Women 0

23 February 2007
Scorecard

New Zealand; 291/6 (50 overs)	v	England; 272 (48.2 overs)
Sarah Tsukigawa 78* (56); Holly Colvin 2/40 (8 overs)		Charlotte Edwards 86 (93); Sarah Burke 3/42 (7 overs)

New Zealand Women won by 19 runs
IIT Chemplast Ground, Chennai
Umpires: Krishnamachari Srinivasan (Ind) and SM Raju (Ind)
Player of the match: Sarah Tsukigawa (NZ)

- England Women won the toss and elected to field.
- Points: New Zealand Women 4, England Women 0

25 February 2007
Scorecard

England; 216/7 (50 overs)	v	Australia; 217/4 (39.5 overs)
Claire Taylor 113* (115); Kirsten Pike 2/31 (10 overs)		Lisa Sthalekar 85* (84); Laura Newton 2/34 (10 overs)

Australia Women won by 6 wickets
IIT Chemplast Ground, Chennai
Umpires: KG Lakshminarayan (Ind) and Sundaram Ravi (Ind)
Player of the match: Lisa Sthalekar (Aus)

- England Women won the toss and elected to bat.
- Points: Australia Women 5, England Women 0

25 February 2007
Scorecard

India; 201 (49.2 overs)	v	New Zealand; 202/7 (47.1 overs)
Hemlata Kala 65 (96); Sarah Tsukigawa 3/33 (5.2 overs)		Maria Fahey 59 (96); Jhulan Goswami 4/26 (10 overs)

New Zealand Women won by 3 wickets
MA Chidambaram Stadium, Chennai
Umpires: R Radhakrishnan (Ind) and SM Raju (Ind)
Player of the match: Maria Fahey (NZ)

- India Women won the toss and elected to bat.
- Selena Charteris (NZ) made her WODI debut.
- Points: New Zealand Women 4, India Women 0

28 February 2007
Scorecard

Australia; 232/8 (50 overs)	v	New Zealand; 183 (45 overs)
Lisa Sthalekar 45 (67); Aimee Watkins 2/20 (3 overs)		Sara McGlashan 35 (45); Kirsten Pike 3/31 (10 overs)

Australia Women won by 49 runs
IIT Chemplast Ground, Chennai
Umpires: GA Pratapkumar (Ind) and Sundaram Ravi (Ind)
Player of the match: Lisa Sthalekar (Aus)

- New Zealand Women won the toss and elected to field.
- Points: Australia Women 5, New Zealand Women 0

28 February 2007
Scorecard

England; 143 (45.5 overs)	v	India; 144/2 (38.5 overs)
Lydia Greenway 50* (76); Amita Sharma 4/16 (10 overs)		Jaya Sharma 66 (109); Laura Newton 1/12 (9.5 overs)

India Women won by 8 wickets
MA Chidambaram Stadium, Chennai
Umpires: Krishnamachari Srinivasan (Ind) and SM Raju (Ind)
Player of the match: Amita Sharma (Ind)

- India Women won the toss and elected to field.
- Lynsey Askew (Eng) made her WODI debut.
- Points: India Women 5, England Women 0

1 March 2007
Scorecard

England; 268/8 (50 overs)	v	Australia; 269/4 (46.4 overs)
Sarah Taylor 101 (111); Kirsten Pike 2/35 (8 overs)		Lisa Sthalekar 77 (82); Holly Colvin 2/45 (9 overs)

Australia Women won by 6 wickets
IIT Chemplast Ground, Chennai
Umpires: KG Lakshminarayan (Ind) and R Sundar (Ind)
Player of the match: Lisa Sthalekar (Aus)

- Australia Women won the toss and elected to field.
- Points: Australia Women 4, England Women 0

1 March 2007
Scorecard

New Zealand; 272/7 (50 overs)	v	India; 181/8 (50 overs)
Suzie Bates 122 (134); Jhulan Goswami 2/43 (10 overs)		Mithali Raj 31 (54); Aimee Watkins 3/36 (10 overs)

New Zealand Women won by 91 runs
MA Chidambaram Stadium, Chennai
Umpires: Krishnamachari Srinivasan (Ind) and Sundaram Ravi (Ind)
Player of the match: Suzie Bates (NZ)

- India Women won the toss and elected to field.
- Points: New Zealand Women 5, India Women 0

3 March 2007
Scorecard

India; 230/9 (50 overs)	v	Australia; 231/6 (50 overs)
Karu Jain 75 (119); Lisa Sthalekar 3/64 (10 overs)		Melissa Bulow 85 (91); Nooshin Al Khadeer 2/48 (10 overs)

Australia Women won by 4 wickets
MA Chidambaram Stadium, Chennai
Umpires: GA Pratapkumar (Ind) and SM Raju (Ind)
Player of the match: Melissa Bulow (Aus)

- India Women won the toss and elected to bat.
- Points: Australia Women 4, India Women 0

3 March 2007
Scorecard

New Zealand; 267/9 (50 overs)	v	England; 240 (45.2 overs)
Aimee Watkins 48 (51); Holly Colvin 3/37 (10 overs)		Lynsey Askew 68 (71); Louise Milliken 4/42 (10 overs)

New Zealand Women won by 27 runs
IIT Chemplast Ground, Chennai
Umpires: Krishnamachari Srinivasan (Ind) and Sundaram Ravi (Ind)
Player of the match: Louise Milliken (NZ)

- England Women won the toss and elected to field.
- Points: New Zealand Women 4, England Women 0

=== Third-Place play-off ===
5 March 2007
Scorecard

India; 219 (49.2 overs)	v	England; 220/4 (46.2 overs)
Rumeli Dhar 74 (87); Holly Colvin 3/50 (10 overs)		Claire Taylor 77* (98); Rumeli Dhar 1/32 (9 overs)

England Women won by 6 wickets
IIT Chemplast Ground, Chennai
Umpires: SV Ramani (Ind) and TR Kashyappan (Ind)
Player of the match: Jenny Gunn (Eng)

- India Women won the toss and elected to bat.

=== Final ===
5 March 2007
Scorecard

New Zealand; 177/9 (50 overs)	v	Australia; 181/4 (38.2 overs)
Nicola Browne 41 (80); Kirsten Pike 3/21 (10 overs)		Shelley Nitschke 81 (81); Sarah Tsukigawa 2/20 (8 overs)

Australia Women won by 6 wickets
MA Chidambaram Stadium, Chennai
Umpires: GA Pratapkumar (Ind) and Sundaram Ravi (Ind)
Player of the match: Shelley Nitschke and Kirsten Pike (Aus)

- New Zealand Women won the toss and elected to bat.

== Statistics ==
=== Most runs ===
Player	Team	Innings	Runs	Average	Strike rate	Highest Score
Lisa Sthalekar	Australia	7	394	98.50	82.77	87*
Claire Taylor	England	7	346	69.20	87.81	113*
Jaya Sharma	India	7	314	52.33	64.34	104*
Melissa Bulow	Australia	5	259	51.80	80.68	85
Sarah Taylor	England	7	257	36.71	85.38	101
Source: ESPNcricinfo

=== Most wickets ===
Player	Team	Overs	Wickets	Average	Economy	BBI
Kirsten Pike	Australia	67.0	14	18.07	3.77	3/21
Jhulan Goswami	India	67.0	11	20.63	3.38	4/26
Louise Milliken	New Zealand	64.0	11	28.72	4.93	4/42
Holly Colvin	England	52.5	10	25.50	4.82	3/37
Preeti Dimri	India	66.5	10	29.50	4.41	3/46
Source: ESPNcricinfo
