= New Zealand women's cricket team in Australia in 2006–07 =

	Australia	New Zealand
- Dates: 16 – 28 October 2006
Captains	Karen Rolton (Note: Lisa Sthalekar captained Australia for the final three WODIs.)	Haidee Tiffen

One Day International series
- Results: Australia won the 5-match series 5–0
Most runs	Lisa Sthalekar (210)	Maria Fahey (202)
Most wickets	Shelley Nitschke (7)	Helen Watson (6)
- Player of the series: Lisa Sthalekar (Aus)

Twenty20 International series
- Results: Australia won the 1-match series 1–0
Most runs	Karen Rolton (71)	Maria Fahey (43)
Most wickets	Julie Hayes (2)	Nicola Browne (1); Sophie Devine (1); Louise Milliken (1)

The New Zealand women's national cricket team toured Australia in October 2006. They first played against Australia in one Twenty20 International, which ended in a tie before Australia won on a bowl out. The two sides then played in five One Day Internationals, which were to contest the Rose Bowl. Australia won the series 5–0.

== Squads ==
Australia	New Zealand
Karen Rolton (c); Sarah Andrews; Kate Blackwell; Melissa Bulow; Sarah Elliott; Jodie Fields (wk); Cathryn Fitzpatrick; Michelle Goszko; Julie Hayes; Shelley Nitschke; Kirsten Pike; Leah Poulton; Clea Smith; Lisa Sthalekar	Haidee Tiffen (c); Nicola Browne; Sarah Burke; Sophie Devine; Anna Dodd; Maria Fahey; Ros Kember; Sara McGlashan; Louise Milliken; Rebecca Rolls (wk); Sarah Tsukigawa; Aimee Watkins; Helen Watson

== Tour Match ==
=== 50-over match: Queensland v New Zealand ===
16 October 2006
Scorecard

New Zealand; 148 (40.1 overs)	v	Queensland; 103 (36 overs)
Sarah McGlashan 50 (63); Julia Price 2/2 (2.1 overs)		Megan White 36 (41); Anna Dodd 2/6 (3 overs)

New Zealand Women won by 45 runs
Peter Burge Oval, Brisbane
Umpires: Dave Orchard (SA) and Bruce Oxenford (Aus)

- New Zealand Women won the toss and elected to bat.

== Only WT20I ==
18 October 2006
Scorecard

New Zealand; 141/7 (20 overs)	v	Australia; 141/5 (20 overs)
Maria Fahey 43 (39); Julie Hayes 2/19 (4 overs)		Karen Rolton 71* (59); Nicola Browne 1/19 (4 overs)

Match Tied (Australia Women won on bowl out)
Allan Border Field, Brisbane
Umpires: Andrew Curran (Aus) and Norm McNamara (Aus)

- Australia Women won the toss and elected to field.
- Australia Women won the bowl out 2–1.
- Sarah Andrews, Melissa Bulow, Jodie Fields, Michelle Goszko, Leah Poulton (Aus), Sophie Devine, Maria Fahey, Louise Milliken and Sarah Tsukigawa (NZ) all made their WT20I debuts.

== WODI Series ==
=== 1st ODI ===
20 October 2006
Scorecard

Australia; 201/9 (50 overs)	v	New Zealand; 200/9 (50 overs)
Lisa Sthalekar 51 (75); Anna Dodd 2/18 (6 overs)		Aimee Watkins 71 (82); Cathryn Fitzpatrick 2/49 (10 overs)

Australia Women won by 1 run
Allan Border Field, Brisbane
Umpires: Tim Laycock (Aus) and Norm McNamara (Aus)

- Australia Women won the toss and elected to bat.
- Leah Poulton (Aus) made her WODI debut.

=== 2nd ODI ===
22 October 2006
Scorecard

New Zealand; 175 (46.4 overs)	v	Australia; 176/9 (49.5 overs)
Rebecca Rolls 66 (54); Julie Hayes 3/37 (10 overs)		Lisa Sthalekar 53 (74); Louise Milliken 3/45 (10 overs)

Australia Women won by 1 wicket
Allan Border Field, Brisbane
Umpires: Andrew Curran (Aus) and Tim Laycock (Aus)

- New Zealand Women won the toss and elected to bat.
- Sophie Devine and Ros Kember (NZ) both made their WODI debuts.

=== 3rd ODI ===
24 October 2006
Scorecard

Australia; 236/6 (50 overs)	v	New Zealand; 231/8 (50 overs)
Leah Poulton 101 (136); Sophie Devine 2/32 (7 overs)		Maria Fahey 69 (103); Sarah Andrews 2/51 (10 overs)

Australia Women won by 5 runs
Allan Border Field, Brisbane
Umpires: Andrew Curran (Aus) and Bruce Oxenford (Aus)

- Australia Women won the toss and elected to bat.

=== 4th ODI ===
26 October 2006
Scorecard

Australia; 252/9 (50 overs)	v	New Zealand; 167 (43.3 overs)
Leah Poulton 68 (77); Helen Watson 2/32 (10 overs)		Maria Fahey 56 (78); Shelley Nitschke 3/32 (8 overs)

Australia Women won by 85 runs
Allan Border Field, Brisbane
Umpires: Andrew Curran (Aus) and Tim Laycock (Aus)

- Australia Women won the toss and elected to bat.

=== 5th ODI ===
28 October 2006
Scorecard

New Zealand; 204/8 (50 overs)	v	Australia; 205/6 (47.4 overs)
Sara McGlashan 45 (54); Kirsten Pike 4/23 (10 overs)		Sarah Elliott 45* (48); Nicola Browne 2/36 (8 overs)

Australia Women won by 4 wickets
Allan Border Field, Brisbane
Umpires: Norm McNamara (Aus) and Tim Laycock (Aus)

- New Zealand Women won the toss and elected to bat.
