= List of New Zealand women Twenty20 International cricketers =

Since their first match in 2004, 67 women have represented the New Zealand national women's cricket team in Twenty20 Internationals (WT20Is). A Twenty20 International is a cricket match between two international representative teams, each having WT20I status, as determined by the International Cricket Council (ICC).

This list includes all players who have played at least one Twenty20 International match and is initially arranged in the order of debut appearance. Where more than one player won their first cap in the same match, those players are initially listed alphabetically by last name at the time of debut.

== Key ==
General

- † – Wicket-keeper
- First – Year of debut
- Last – Year of latest game
- Mat – Number of matches played

Batting

- Runs – Runs scored in career
- HS – Highest score
- 100 – Centuries scored
- 50 – Half-centuries scored
- Avg – Runs scored per dismissal
- * – Batsman remained not out

Bowling

- Balls – Balls bowled in career
- Wkt – Wickets taken in career
- BBI – Best bowling in an innings
- Ave – Average runs per wicket

Fielding

- Ca – Catches taken
- St – Stumpings taken

== Players ==
Statistics are correct as of 22 October 2026.

New Zealand women T20I cricketers
General					Batting					Bowling				Fielding	
Cap	Name	First	Last	Mat	Runs	HS	Avg	50	100	Balls	Wkt	BBI	Ave	Ca	St
1	Nicola Browne	2004	2014	54	552	34*	16.23	0	0	876	47	4/15	17.31	24	0
2	Sarah Burke	2004	2008	7	6	3*	6.00	0	0	138	7	3/15	21.28	0	0
3	Paula Flannery	2004	2004	1	18	18	18.00	0	0	–	–	–	–	0	0
4	Amanda Green	2004	2004	1	3	3	3.00	0	0	24	2	2/20	10.00	0	0
5	Maia Lewis	2004	2004	1	25	25	25.00	0	0	–	–	–	–	0	0
6	Sara McGlashan	2004	2016	76	1164	84	18.18	2	0	–	–	–	–	29	0
7	Rebecca Rolls †	2004	2006	2	80	41	40.00	0	0	–	–	–	–	2	1
8	Rebecca Steele	2004	2004	1	–	–	–	–	–	24	0	–	–	2	0
9	Haidee Tiffen	2004	2009	9	121	30	17.28	0	0	–	–	–	–	6	0
10	Aimee Watkins	2004	2011	36	772	89*	23.39	3	0	507	22	3/8	23.59	14	0
11	Helen Watson	2004	2008	8	16	9*	16.00	0	0	168	7	3/13	21.71	2	0
12	Sophie Devine	2006	2026	158	3817	105	28.69	24	1	2258	130	4/12	19.54	49	0
13	Maria Fahey	2006	2010	8	134	43	22.33	0	0	–	–	–	–	1	0
14	Louise Milliken	2006	2006	1	–	–	–	–	–	24	1	1/28	28.00	0	0
15	Sarah Tsukigawa	2006	2011	19	129	22	9.21	0	0	150	5	2/19	34.00	0	2
16	Beth McNeill	2007	2009	2	–	–	–	–	–	30	0	–	–	0	0
17	Rachel Priest †	2007	2020	75	873	60	16.78	1	0	–	–	–	–	41	31
18	Amy Satterthwaite	2007	2021	111	1784	71*	21.49	1	0	513	26	6/17	23.42	36	0
19	Suzie Bates	2007	2026	186	4758	124*	28.83	28	1	1342	62	4/26	24.03	98	0
20	Selena Charteris	2007	2007	2	5	5*	–	0	0	24	1	1/17	17.00	1	0
21	Ros Kember	2007	2007	3	22	15	7.33	0	0	–	–	–	–	0	0
22	Rowan Milburn †	2007	2007	2	1	1*	–	0	0	–	–	–	–	0	1
23	Rachel Candy	2007	2013	10	14	9*	7.00	0	0	198	7	2/24	30.42	3	0
24	Lucy Doolan	2008	2013	33	194	41	9.70	0	0	600	28	3/16	21.50	5	0
25	Katey Martin †	2008	2022	95	996	65	18.10	4	0	–	–	–	–	33	24
26	Kate Pulford	2009	2010	12	66	29	11.00	0	0	234	11	2/21	16.90	1	0
27	Victoria Lind	2009	2009	2	29	20	14.50	0	0	–	–	–	–	0	0
28	Sian Ruck	2009	2013	37	16	6	4.00	0	0	750	40	3/12	17.20	5	0
29	Saskia Bullen	2009	2010	3	–	–	–	–	–	54	3	2/20	19.00	0	0
30	Erin Bermingham	2010	2017	31	74	20	5.69	0	0	630	33	2/12	17.24	3	0
31	Kate Ebrahim	2010	2021	39	91	27*	8.27	0	0	580	22	3/9	27.04	8	0
32	Liz Perry	2010	2017	31	369	50*	16.77	1	0	–	–	–	–	12	0
33	Kelly Anderson	2011	2011	2	1	1*	–	0	0	24	3	3/17	5.66	0	0
34	Lea Tahuhu	2011	2026	104	247	27	10.73	0	0	1883	100	4/6	20.19	19	0
35	Frances Mackay	2011	2021	30	332	51	19.52	1	0	526	25	3/18	23.04	7	0
36	Morna Nielsen	2012	2016	44	60	21*	12.00	0	0	941	41	4/10	18.36	6	0
37	Katie Perkins	2012	2020	55	448	34	17.23	0	0	–	–	–	–	15	0
38	Maddy Green	2012	2026	131	1521	62	19.75	0	3	66	2	1/5	33.00	47	2
39	Hayley Jensen	2014	2023	53	188	19	8.54	0	0	898	48	3/5	20.54	13	0
40	Samantha Curtis	2014	2017	8	13	8	3.25	0	0	–	–	–	–	0	0
41	Holly Huddleston	2014	2020	16	15	10	7.50	0	0	264	13	2/9	18.30	5	0
42	Felicity Leydon-Davis	2014	2016	8	–	–	–	–	–	132	4	2/15	30.00	2	0
43	Georgia Guy	2014	2015	6	2	2	2.00	0	0	108	3	1/14	33.33	0	0
44	Anna Peterson	2015	2020	33	92	15	6.13	0	0	372	18	3/2	23.72	8	0
45	Natalie Dodd	2015	2018	6	26	14	8.66	0	0	–	–	–	–	0	0
46	Leigh Kasperek	2015	2024	52	119	19	6.26	0	0	1128	81	4/7	14.86	12	0
47	Hannah Rowe	2015	2024	47	155	33	15.50	0	0	486	24	3/18	25.91	17	0
48	Thamsyn Newton	2015	2021	15	22	14	5.50	0	0	138	9	3/9	14.00	8	0
49	Amelia Kerr	2016	2094	107	2049	105	30.34	7	2	2297	113	4/20	21.14	52	0
50	Kate Heffernan	2018	2018	2	–	–	–	–	–	36	1	1/14	29.00	0	0
51	Bernadine Bezuidenhout † (Note: Bernadine Bezuidenhout had played 13 WT20I matches for South Africa. Only her records for New Zealand are given above.)	2018	2024	22	231	44	12.83	0	0	–	–	–	–	6	3
52	Jess Watkin	2018	2019	9	118	77*	16.85	1	0	123	7	3/9	18.85	1	0
53	Rosemary Mair	2019	2026	51	60	13*	8.57	0	0	954	33	4/19	32.84	5	0
54	Caitlin Gurrey	2019	2019	2	19	15	9.50	0	0	–	–	–	–	0	0
55	Lauren Down	2020	2022	13	93	17	13.28	0	0	–	–	–	–	5	0
56	Jess Kerr	2020	2026	60	234	38	13.00	0	0	1138	44	3/16	29.27	16	0
57	Brooke Halliday	2021	2026	66	684	46*	16.28	0	0	100	8	2/11	14.12	9	0
58	Eden Carson	2022	2025	37	29	7	4.83	0	0	684	39	3/18	19.10	7	0
59	Isabella Gaze †	2022	2026	48	557	85*	19.89	3	0	–	–	–	–	17	12
60	Fran Jonas	2022	2024	39	12	4*	12.00	0	0	761	30	4/22	25.20	13	0
61	Georgia Plimmer	2022	2026	57	772	85*	17.54	4	0	–	–	–	–	18	0
62	Molly Penfold	2022	2026	11	4	2	2.00	0	0	159	7	2/17	28.57	1	0
63	Jess McFadyen	2022	2022	1	–	–	–	–	–	–	–	–	–	0	0
64	Rebecca Burns	2022	2022	2	20	20	10.00	0	0	–	–	–	–	0	0
65	Kate Anderson	2023	2023	4	62	25	15.50	0	0	–	–	–	–	0	0
66	Bella Armstrong	2023	2023	1	11	11	11.00	0	0	–	–	–	–	0	0
67	Mikaela Greig	2024	2024	1	0	0	0.00	0	0	–	–	–	–	0	0
68	Bree Illing	2025	2026	18	5	3	5.00	0	0	340	12	2/18	30.75	2	0
69	Polly Inglis	2025	2026	12	26	19	6.50	0	0	–	–	–	–	3	1
70	Emma McLeod	2025	2025	3	59	44	19.66	0	0	–	–	–	–	0	0
71	Izzy Sharp	2025	2026	22	248	62	24.80	1	0	–	–	–	–	7	0
72	Flora Devonshire	2025	2026	6	13	120	6.50	0	0	30	2	1/12	15.50	0	0
73	Bella James	2025	2025	1	14	14	14.00	0	0	–	–	–	–	1	0
74	Nensi Patel	2026	2026	14	3	2	3.00	0	0	270	15	3/8	17.20	4	0
75	Kayley Knight	2026	2026	2	–	–	–	–	–	42	2	2/25	20.50	1	0
