= Katey Martin =

New Zealand cricket commentator and cricketer (born 1985)

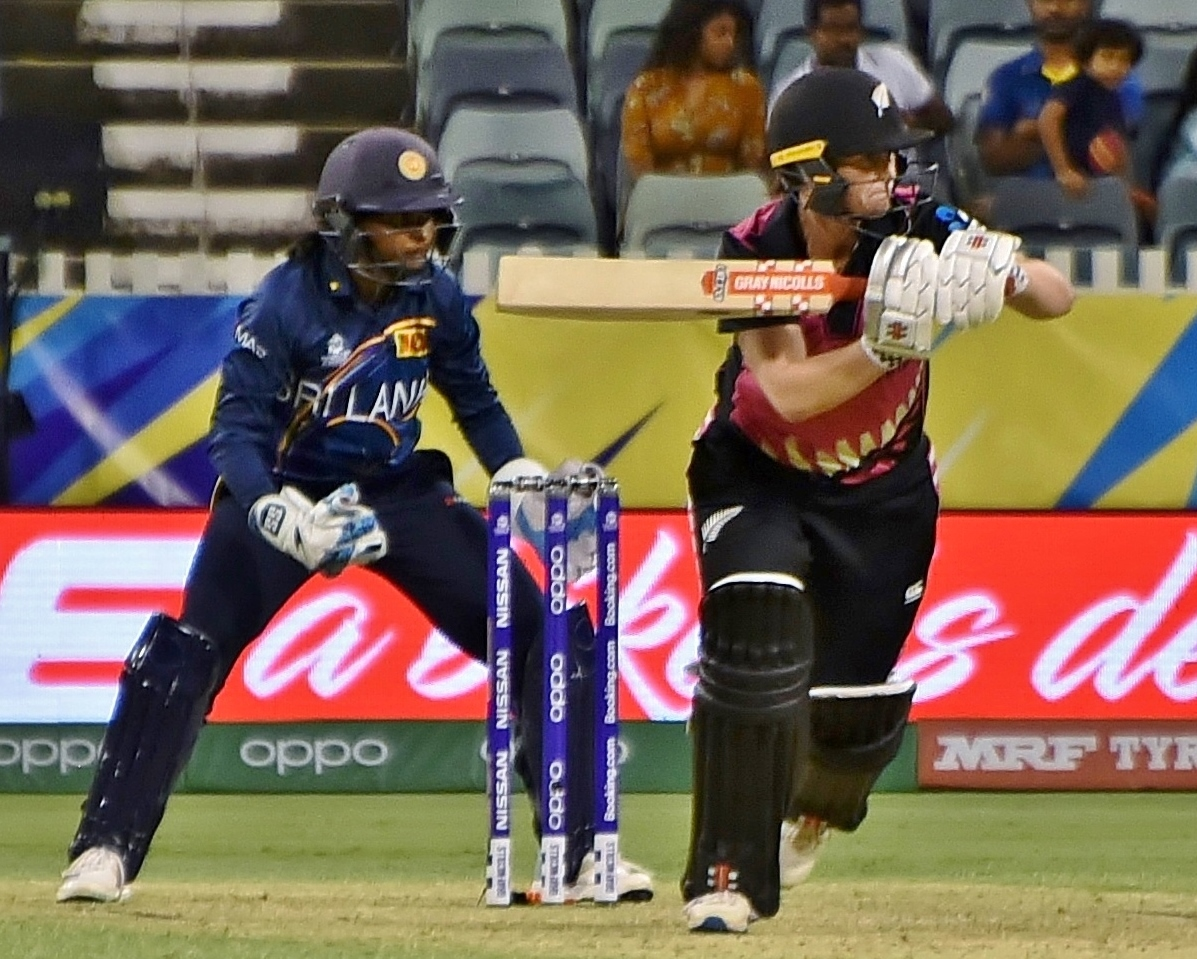
- Martin batting for New Zealand during the 2020 ICC Women's T20 World Cup

Personal information
- Full name: Katey Jane Martin
- Born: 7 February 1985 (age 41); Dunedin, New Zealand
- Batting: Right-handed
- Role: Wicket-keeper

International information
- National side: New Zealand (2003–2022)
- Only Test (cap 116): 27 November 2003 v India
- ODI debut (cap 97): 4 December 2003 v England
- Last ODI: 26 March 2022 v Pakistan
- T20I debut (cap 25): 6 March 2008 v Australia
- Last T20I: 9 February 2022 v India

Domestic team information
- Years: Team
- 2001/02–2021/22: Otago
- 2017/18–2019/20: Melbourne Stars

Career statistics
Competition	WTest	WODI	WT20I	WLA
Matches	1	103	95	279
Runs scored	49	1,793	996	6,459
Batting average	24.50	22.13	18.10	28.32
100s/50s	0/0	0/7	0/4	7/34
Top score	46	81	65	118*
Balls bowled	–	–	–	6
Wickets	–	–	–	1
Bowling average	–	–	–	7.00
5 wickets in innings	–	–	–	0
10 wickets in match	–	–	–	0
Best bowling	–	–	–	1/7
Catches/stumpings	0/0	63/19	33/24	172/90
- Source: CricketArchive, 18 May 2022

Katey Jane Martin (born 7 February 1985) is a New Zealand cricket commentator and former cricketer who played as a wicket-keeper and right-handed batter. She appeared in one Test match, 103 One Day Internationals and 95 Twenty20 Internationals for New Zealand between 2003 and 2022. She played domestic cricket for Otago and Melbourne Stars.

== Early life ==
Martin was born on 7 February 1985 in Dunedin.

== Domestic career ==
Martin made her debut for Otago in the 2001–02 State League, against Central Districts. She went on to play for Otago for her whole career, until the end of the 2021–22 season. She holds the record for the most matches and most wicket-keeping dismissals in New Zealand women's domestic one-day cricket, and is one of six players with 4,000 runs in New Zealand domestic one-day cricket, and one of six players with 2,000 runs in New Zealand domestic T20 cricket. In the 2007–08 season, she made 5 stumpings for Otago against Wellington, a record in New Zealand domestic one-day cricket. She made her List A high score in 2015, when she scored 118* for Otago against Northern Districts. During her time with Otago, the side won two one-day titles and one Super Smash title.

Martin played for Melbourne Stars between 2017–18 and 2019–20 in the Women's Big Bash League, with a high score of 31 against Sydney Sixers in 2019. In 2022, Martin played in the FairBreak Invitational T20, where she played for Tornadoes, scoring 26 runs and making 6 dismissals. The final of the tournament, which Tornadoes won, would prove to be Martin's final match as she announced her retirement in the week after the tournament ended.

== International career ==
After appearing for New Zealand's A side in early 2003, Martin was first called up to the New Zealand squad for their tour of India in November and December 2003. She made her international debut in the first match of the series, a Test match, in which she scored 46 in the first innings. It would prove to be the only Test match Martin would play. She made her One Day International debut in the 1st ODI of the tour. She made her Twenty20 International debut in 2008, against Australia.

Martin went on to play 103 One Day Internationals and 95 Twenty20 Internationals. She scored 7 ODI half-centuries, with a high score of 81, made from 72 deliveries in her side's 126-run victory over South Africa in 2016. She also took 63 catches and made 19 stumpings in ODIs. She scored four T20I half-centuries, with a high score of 65, made from 42 deliveries against the West Indies in 2018. She took 32 catches and made 25 stumpings in T20Is.

Martin played for New Zealand at the 2009, 2017 and 2022 World Cups and at the 2009, 2012, 2014 and 2016 T20 World Cups. She was awarded a central contract by New Zealand Cricket in 2018, following the tours of Ireland and England in the previous months.

In March 2021, at the age of 36 years and 24 days, Martin became the oldest player to represent New Zealand in a WT20I match, in their series against England. On 13 March 2022, in New Zealand's World Cup match against Australia, Martin played in her 100th WODI match. She played her final international match in the same tournament, in New Zealand's final group stage match against Pakistan.

Martin announced her retirement from all forms of cricket in May 2022.

== Commentary career ==
Martin is a commentator of men's and women's domestic and international cricket. She began her commentary career at a training session that New Zealand Cricket ran for players interested in broadcasting, alongside Jimmy Neesham. Martin felt she performed poorly in this session, but she later agreed to wear a microphone during matches to talk to commentators during live television broadcasts. In late 2020, this led to Channel 7 asking her to stay in Australia after New Zealand's tour to join the commentary team for the 2020–21 season of the Women's Big Bash League. She then returned to New Zealand to join the Spark Sport commentary team. During Bangladesh's tour of New Zealand in January 2022, Martin and Frankie Mackay became New Zealand's first all-women cricket commentary team during a men's Test match. This was not scheduled deliberately; as members of a larger commentary squad, Martin and Mackay happened to be rostered together and they only realised the significance afterwards.
