= Beas Sarkar =

Indian cricketer (born 1979)

Personal information
- Full name: Beas Sarkar
- Born: 23 December 1979 (age 46); India
- Batting: Right-handed
- Bowling: Right-arm medium fast

International information
- National side: India
- Only ODI (cap 73): 16 December 2003 v New Zealand
- Source: CricketArchive, 8 May 2020

Beas Sarkar (born 23 December 1979) is a One Day International cricketer who represents India. She represents Bengal Women in India's domestic league. She is a right-hand batsman and bowls right-arm medium fast and has played one ODI.
