= Paula Flannery =

New Zealand cricketer (born 1974)

Personal information
- Full name: Paula Bernadette Flannery
- Born: 27 May 1974 (age 52); Clyde, Central Otago, New Zealand
- Batting: Right-handed
- Bowling: Right-arm off break
- Role: Batter

International information
- National side: New Zealand (2000–2004)
- Only Test (cap 124): 21 August 2004 v England
- ODI debut (cap 82): 22 February 2000 v England
- Last ODI: 15 August 2004 v England
- Only T20I (cap 3): 5 August 2004 v New Zealand

Domestic team information
- Years: Team
- 1995/96–2001/02: Canterbury
- 2002: Kent
- 2003/04–2004/05: Otago

Career statistics
Competition	WTest	WODI	WT20I	WLA
Matches	1	17	1	118
Runs scored	64	258	18	3,069
Batting average	32.00	17.20	18.00	30.69
100s/50s	0/0	0/0	0/0	4/12
Top score	46	49*	18	118
Balls bowled	6	–	–	448
Wickets	0	–	–	14
Bowling average	–	–	–	16.85
5 wickets in innings	0	–	–	0
10 wickets in match	0	–	–	0
Best bowling	–	–	–	3/30
Catches/stumpings	0/–	3/–	3/–	32/–
- Source: CricketArchive, 11 April 2021

Paula Bernadette Flannery (born 27 May 1974) is a New Zealand former cricketer who played as a right-handed batter. She appeared in 1 Test match, 17 One Day Internationals and 1 Twenty20 International for New Zealand between 2000 and 2004. She played domestic cricket for Canterbury and Otago, as well as spending one season with Kent. Following her playing career, Flannery has coached girls' cricket in Christchurch.
