= Jo Day =

Irish cricketer (born 1975)

Personal information
- Full name: Joanna Christine Day
- Born: 4 September 1975 (age 51); Dublin, Ireland
- Batting: Right-handed
- Role: Wicket-keeper

International information
- National side: Ireland (2004–2006)
- ODI debut (cap 50): 22 July 2004 v New Zealand
- Last ODI: 23 August 2006 v Netherlands

Career statistics
Competition	WODI	WLA
Matches	6	9
Runs scored	7	8
Batting average	7.00	8.00
100s/50s	0/0	0/0
Top score	4*	4*
Catches/stumpings	5/1	6/1
- Source: CricketArchive, 22 April 2022

Joanna Christine Day (born 4 September 1975) is an Irish former cricketer who played as a wicket-keeper and right-handed batter. She appeared in six One Day Internationals for Ireland between 2004 and 2006, including being part of the side's squad at the 2005 World Cup.
