= Sarah Andrews (cricketer) =

Australian cricketer

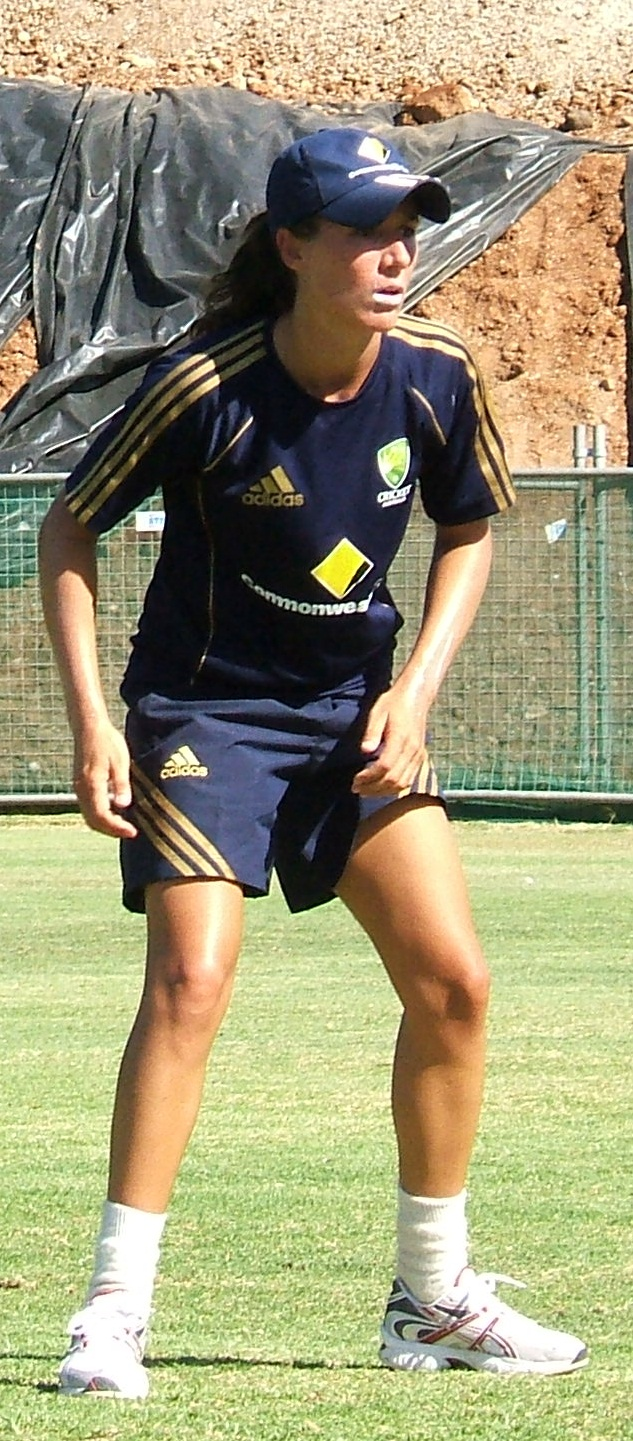

Personal information
- Full name: Sarah Joy Andrews
- Born: 26 December 1981 (age 44); Moruya, New South Wales, Australia
- Batting: Right-handed
- Bowling: Right-arm fast-medium

International information
- National side: Australia
- Test debut (cap 148): 18 February 2006 v India
- Last Test: 10 July 2009 v England
- ODI debut (cap 106): 26 February 2006 v India
- Last ODI: 7 March 2010 v New Zealand

Domestic team information
- Years: Team
- 2001/02–2009/10: New South Wales Breakers

Career statistics
Competition	WTest	WODI	WT20I
Matches	3	39	16
Runs scored	33	102	12
Batting average	11.00	10.20	–
100s/50s	0/0	0/0	0/0
Top score	11	21*	10*
Balls bowled	447	1666	327
Wickets	4	54	10
Bowling average	33.75	21.14	36.80
5 wickets in innings	0	0	0
10 wickets in match	0	0	0
Best bowling	2/29	4/50	3/16
Catches/stumpings	3/–	10/–	3/–
- Source: Cricinfo, 5 May 2010

Sarah Joy Andrews (born 26 December 1981) is a retired female cricketer who played for Australia from 2006 to early 2010. She was a right-arm fast bowler and a right-handed lower-order batsman.

After playing in the Second XI in 2000–01, Andrews made her debut for New South Wales in the 2001–02 Women's National Cricket League (WNCL). In her debut season, she was dropped multiple times and not given much of a workload with the ball. She took five wickets and was omitted for the first half of the next season before ending with six wickets despite never bowling a full quota of overs. At the end of the summer, she was selected for the Australian Under-23 team.

In 2003–04, Andrews played a full season for the first time and took seven wickets. In the second final against Victoria, she bowled a full quota of overs for the first time, in her 21st match. On an Under-23 tour of Sri Lanka, she made her first-class debut against the hosts' senior team, taking four wickets. Andrews had a poor 2004–05 WNCL, taking only five wickets, and then started the following season poorly, taking only three wickets in the first six matches. She took career-best figures of 5/16 and followed it with 3/45 the next day, both against Victoria. She then took 3/32 in the first final against Queensland and ended with five for the finals series as New South Wales won the first of five consecutive titles.

Andrews ended with 16 wickets for the tournament and was rewarded with selection for the national team, making her Test and One Day International (ODI) debut at the end of the season against India. She took 2/48 on her Test debut and 3/21 in her first ODI. After taking ten wickets in her first six ODIs, Andrews took 15 wickets in New South Wales' 2006–07 WNCL win. She struggled during a quadrangular series on the spin-friendly pitches of India and was used only sporadically, taking three wickets in four matches, but returned to form in the home Rose Bowl series against New Zealand, taking nine wickets in five matches. In 2007–08, Andrews was in and out of the Australian team and played in six ODIs, taking seven wickets. She was then dropped for the home series against India at the start of the 2008–09 season and was responded by taking 13 wickets in the WNCL to earn a recall. Andrews made sporadic appearances in the Rose Bowl series ahead of the 2009 World Cup, in which she played in four of Australia's seven matches, taking five wickets as Australia came fourth. She was selected for the 2009 World Twenty20 in England, and played in all of Australia's four matches, taking two wickets. In the subsequent bilateral series hosted by England, Andrews took her career best figures of 4/50 and ended with eight ODI wickets.

Andrews took 14 wickets in the 2009–10 WNCL as New South Wales won again, and in the following Rose Bowl series, she bowed out of competitive cricket with ten wickets in seven ODIs as Australia swept the series.

== Early career ==
In January 2000, Andrews played for New South Wales in Under-19 interstate championships. She took 11 wickets at 6.00, with a best of 4/13 in the qualifying match against Victoria. New South Wales won all of their seven matches, defeating Victoria in the final. New South Wales' batting was rarely challenged by their outclassed opposition, so Andrews was only required to bat three times in the lower-order, scoring 15 runs at 7.50. She also took six catches.

In 2000–01, Andrews played in three Second XI fixtures for New South Wales. She scored a total of 19 runs in three brief innings that all ended in not outs, and took two wickets at 38.50 and an economy rate of 3.34.

== Domestic debut ==
Andrews made her senior debut for New South Wales in the 2001–02 Women's National Cricket League, playing in seven matches, all of which ended in victory. Although she was a specialist bowler who batted at the end of the tail and was never required in matches during the season, she was not entrusted with a substantial workload with the ball, sending down an average of only four overs per match. She took 0/10 from five overs in her debut against South Australia, before taking her maiden wickets in the second match of the double-header, claiming 2/7 from three overs. She took only one wicket in the next two matches against Queensland and was dropped for the double-header against Western Australia, before being recalled for the last two round-robin matches against Victoria. She did not bowl in the first, and took 1/17 from six overs in the next. The two teams met again in the finals series, and Andrews was dropped for the first match, before being recalled and taking 1/16 from four overs in the next match as New South Wales won their sixth title in a row with a 2–0 triumph. Andrews ended her first season with five wickets at 16.80 and an economy rate of 3.00.

At the end of the season, Andrews was selected for Australia Youth team to play against New Zealand and New Zealand A. She bowled her full quota of 30 overs in three matches, taking three wickets at 19.00 at an economy rate of 1.90. She also scored 21 runs at 21.00 in three innings. Her best performance was 2/13 in the last match against the senior New Zealand team.

The following season, Andrews missed the first four matches of the WNCL. She took 3/18 in her second match of the season against Queensland and took one wicket in the three other group matches. In the first final against Victoria, Andrew took 0/15 from four overs in a three-wicket defeat. She was dropped for the second final, which Victoria won to end New South Wales' six-year run. Andrews ended with six wickets at 14.83 at an economy rate of 3.17 and scored 3 runs at 3.00. She averaged less than six overs a match. At the end of the summer, she played for the Australian Under-23 team against England; she took a total of 0/47 from 19 overs in a two-innings match and scored 21 in Australia's only innings.

In 2003–04, Andrews played her first full season in the WNCL, taking to the field in all 11 of New South Wales' matches. She took only five wickets in the first five matches, including figures of 2/30 from seven overs in a tie against Victoria. She then went wicketless in the last three fixtures of the round-robin stage. In the first final against defending champions Victoria, she took 0/18 from five overs in a six-wicket defeat. She was retained for the second final despite the four consecutive wicketless matches, and took 2/28 from her ten overs to set up a five-wicket win. This was the first time in her 21 WNCL matches that Andrews had bowled a full quota of overs. In the deciding final, she was taken out of the attack after being hit for 17 runs in three overs; New South Wales ended up winning by three wickets to regain the WNCL title. Andrews ended the season with seven wickets at 36.14 at an economy rate of 3.51 and eight runs at 8.00.

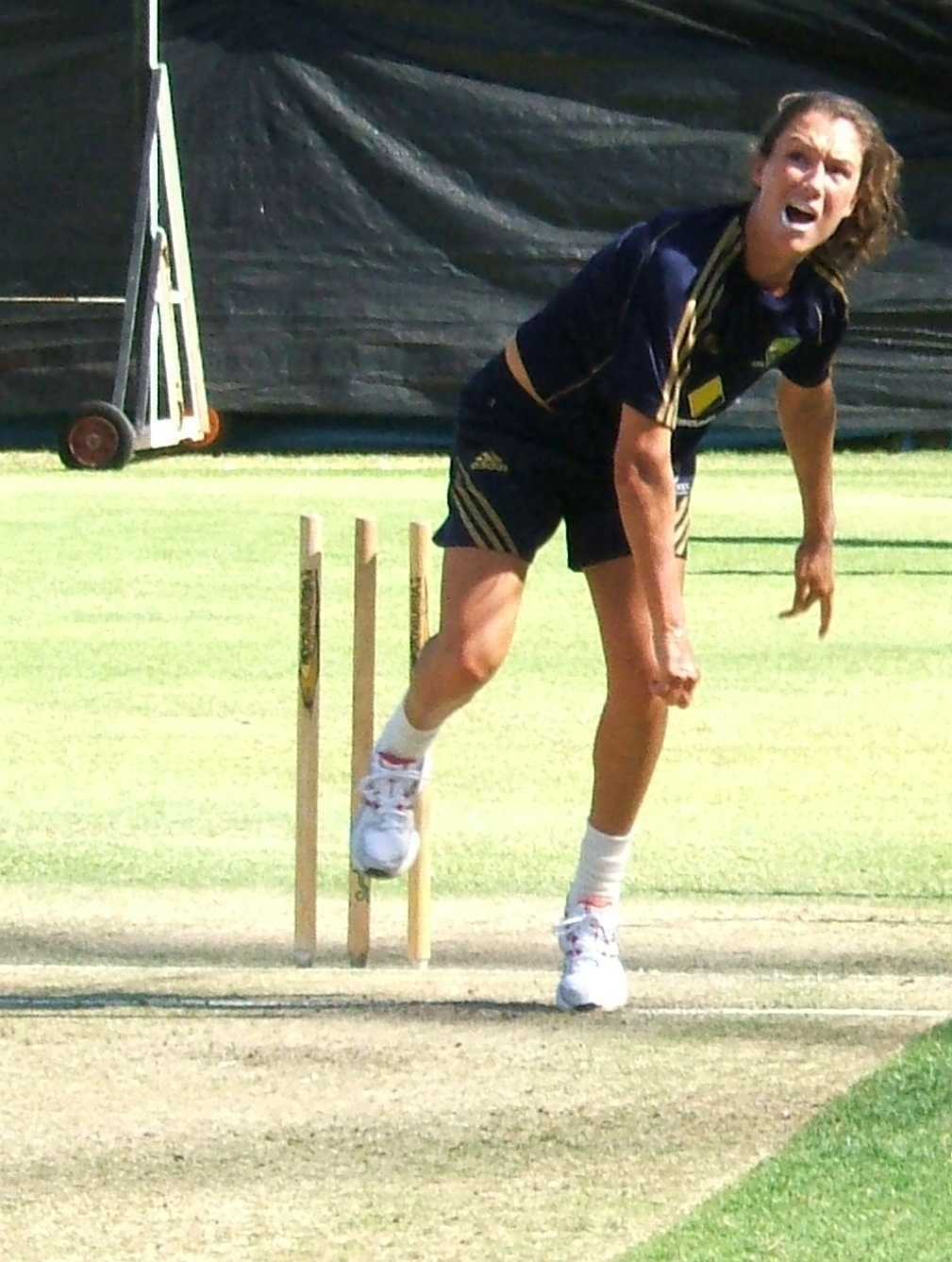
Andrews bowling in the nets at training.

Andrews was selected for the Australia Youth team to play New Zealand A at the end of the season. She took three wickets at 35.00 at an economy rate of 3.00, and hit 54 in a six-wicket defeat in the fourth and final match of the series. Before the 2004–05 season started, Andrews toured Sri Lanka in September as part of the Australian Under-23s to play against the hosts' national team. Australia won three of the four one-dayers, the other was washed-out. Andrews took six wickets at 13.00, including 3/44 in the second match, and scored 10 not out and 31 not out in her only innings. The tour ended with a first-class match against the Sri Lankan team. Andrews took 3/24 and 1/11 in a 144-run win. She also made seven and a duck on her first-class debut.

Andrews had a quiet and ineffective 2004–05 WNCL season, taking only five wickets at 44.80 at an economy rate of 3.01 from ten matches. Her best performance came in a round-robin match against Victoria, taking 2/29 in a four-wicket defeat. The teams met again in the finals. In the first match, she took 0/30 from nine overs in a 21-run win. The second match saw a fightback from the Victorian bowlers, who dismissed New South Wales for 71, Andrews making 19 not out in a tail-wagging performance. She then took 1/10 from six overs but Victoria reached their target with five wickets in hand to square the series. Andrews took 0/11 from six overs to help restrict Victoria to 6/159, but she made only one before being run out as the defending champions fell 50 runs short and ceded their title. Andrews ended the season with 23 runs at 23.00.

The 2005–06 season started poorly for Andrews. She went wicketless in the first three matches, and took only three wickets in the first six matches. Her form turned around in the last two round-robin matches against Victoria. In the first match, having made ten with the bat, she took 5/16, her career best bowling performance, as New South Wales won by 48 runs. The next day, she took 3/45, helping to set up a five-wicket victory. New South Wales faced Queensland in the finals. In the first match, she took 3/35 to dismiss Queensland for 174, setting up a ten-wicket win. In the second final the following day, she made nine not out as New South Wales collapsed to be all out for 154. She took 1/32 from 10 overs as Queensland squared the series with a three-wicket victory. In the last final, Andrews could only make one as New South Wales capitulated to be all out for 146. She then took 1/18, taking the final wicket by bowling Megan White as New South Wales took a thrilling two-run win, sealing the WNCL title. Andrews ended with 20 runs at 10.00 and 16 wickets at 18.81 at an economy rate of 3.48.

== International debut ==
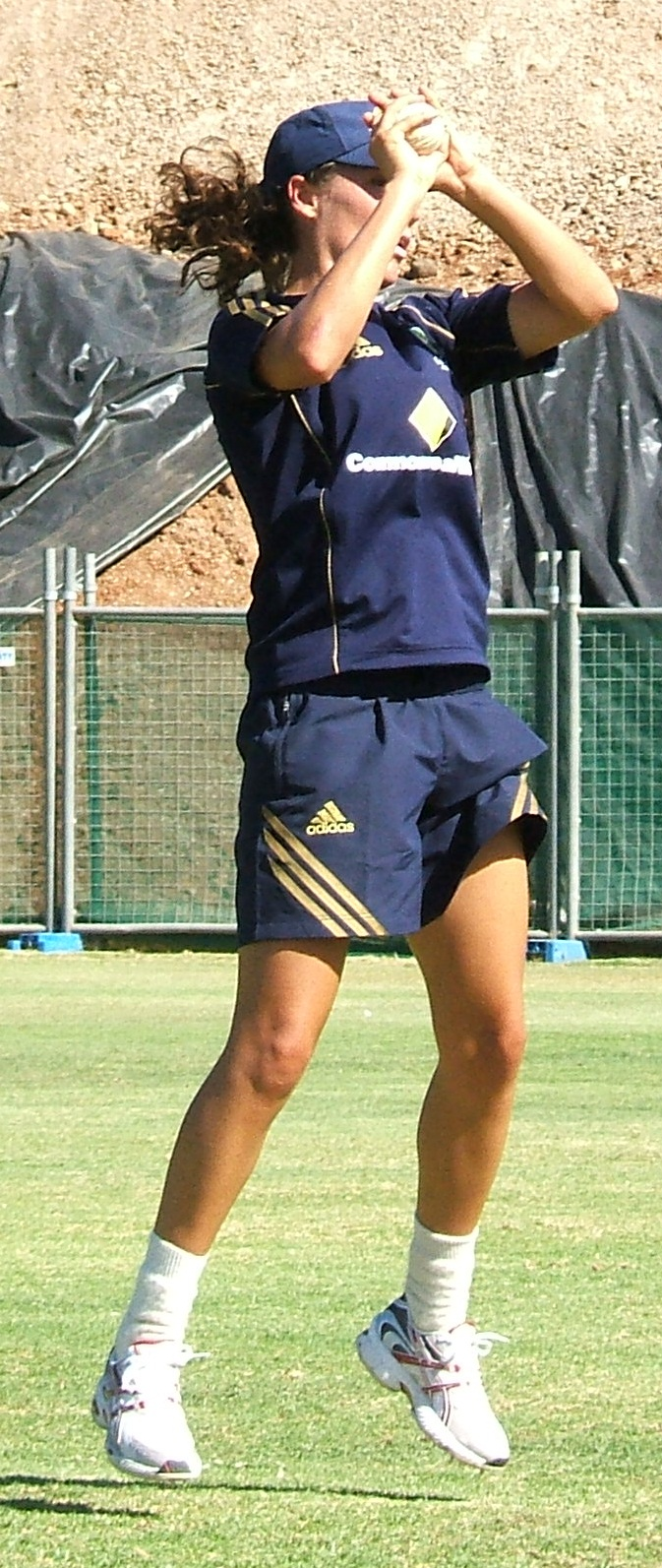
Andrews takes a catch in front of her face at training.

Andrews was rewarded with selection for Australia for the home series against India held in Adelaide at the end of the season. She made her debut in the one-off Test at the Adelaide Oval, and came in at No. 11 after Australia batted first. she made three from six balls before being run out as the hosts made 250. Opening the bowling with Cathryn Fitzpatrick, she took 2/29 from nine overs in the first innings. She had opener Monica Sumra caught by Karen Rolton in her second over, and then trapped the other opener Karu Jain for 21 to leave the Indians at 2/41. In the following over, without further addition to the score, Andrews took her maiden Test catch to dismiss leading Indian batsman and captain Mithali Raj from the bowling of Fitzpatrick. The Indians eventually collapsed to be all out for 93. Australia enforced the follow on and Andrews took 0/19 from 17 overs and caught Sunetra Paranjpe in the second innings as the tourists lost by an innings. After missing the first ODI, she made her debut in the second match, coming in at No. 11 and scoring four not out from seven balls in Australia's 173 all out. She then took 3/21 from six overs to help secure a 12-run win. In the next match she took 1/33 in a nine-wicket win and ended the series with four wickets at 13.50 and an economy rate of 3.33. Andrews is the 148th woman to play Test cricket for Australia, and the 106th woman to play One Day International cricket for Australia.

At the start of the 2006–07 season, Andrews made her Twenty20 international debut against New Zealand at the Allan Border Field in Brisbane, having never played in the format at domestic level. She was attacked by the opposition batsmen, ending with 1/42 from four overs in a tied match. The rest of the Australians conceded their runs at 6.18 per over. After missing the first ODI, she returned to take two wickets in each of the next three matches before going wicketless in the fifth match. She ended with six wickets at 24.50 at the relatively high economy rate of 4.59; Australia won all of the last four matches. The second ODI was a close call as Australia won by one wicket from the penultimate ball of the match. Andrews came in upon the fall of the eighth wicket and scored two from three balls before being run out, but Karen Rolton and Clea Smith saw Australia to victory.

Having broken into international cricket, Andrews started the 2006–07 WNCL season strongly, taking 3/18 to set up a three-wicket win over Victoria in the opening matches of the season. In the fourth match of the tournament, against Queensland, she made a tail-wagging 16 and took 3/27 from her ten overs, but was not able to defend New South Wales' meagre 9/162 as they lost by six wickets. In the sixth match, she made an unbeaten 13 help New South Wales scrape home by two wickets against Western Australia. Andrews took 13 wickets in the eight qualifying matches. New South Wales reached the finals hosted by Victoria after winning five of their eight matches. She took 0/39 from nine overs as the hosts were dismissed for 136 in the first match. New South Wales struggled in the run-chase and Andrews made 17 in the lower order before the defending champions scraped home by one wicket. In the second final, New South Wales's batsmen against struggled and Andrews made 36 to push the total to 144. She took 0/31 from ten overs as the home team reached their target with eight wickets in hand. In the deciding match, Andrews took 2/40 to help restrict Victoria to 7/205 and then made one as New South Wales took a hard-fought three-wicket win and a second consecutive WNCL title. Andrews ended the season with 15 wickets at 22.60 and an economy rate of 3.53. She was also more prominent with the bat than in the past, scoring 107 runs at 21.40.

After the end of the Australian season, Andrews was selected for the ODI team for a four-nations tournament in Chennai, India. In addition to the hosts and Australia, New Zealand and England were also participating, and each team played each other twice in round-robin phase. On dusty, slow and turning pitches conducive to spin, Andrews was overlooked for the first two matches before playing in four remaining qualifying matches. After going wicketless against England, she scored 21 not out—her only innings of the tournament—from 13 balls in the next match against New Zealand, having been promoted to No. 9. She struck three boundaries in her brief innings to help Australia to 232. She then took 2/27 from five overs as Australia completed a 49-run win. After failing to take a wicket in the second match against England, she took 1/26 from five overs in the last round-robin match against India. Australia had won all four matches in which Andrews had played, but she was expensive, taking three wickets at 37.00 and registered an unfavourable economy rate of 4.82. She was left out of the final as Australia defeated New Zealand.

In July 2007, Australia hosted New Zealand in a Rose Bowl series in the middle of the southern hemisphere winter by staging the matches in the tropical northern city of Darwin. Andrews had another expensive spell in the one-off T20 international, conceding 37 from her four overs while her colleagues averaged 4.37 runs per over. However, she was on hand in the run-chase scoring one not out as Australia reached the target with one wicket in hand. She was in better form in the ODIs, taking 2/22 in a seven-wicket win in the first match. After going wicketless in the next fixture, she was promoted to No. 8 for the only time in her career in the run-chase. She made 10 from 16 balls before being bowled as Australia lost by 35 runs. In the next ODI she took 3/23, including five maidens in ten overs, helping to restrict New Zealand to 8/187 and setting up a six-wicket win. She scored an unbeaten 11 and took 2/34 in the next match to help guide the Australians to a two-run win, taking an unassailable 3–1 series lead. She took 2/29 in a four-wicket win in the next match, ending the series with nine wickets at 15.11 and an economy rate of 3.16 and scored 31 runs at 15.50, at a strike rate of 75.61.

After going wicketless in the first two matches of the 2007–08 WNCL against South Australia, Andrews took 3/21 in the next match against Victoria to set up a seven-wicket win. She then took a wicket in each of the next two matches before claiming 2/30 and scoring 13 as New South Wales took a hard-fought two-wicket win over Queensland. She ended the eight-match season with eight wickets at 23.87 and an economy rate of 3.35 and scored 50 runs at 8.33. After winning their first seven matches, New South Wales lost the last match against Western Australia, but it was enough for them to qualify first to host the final. The decider against South Australia was abandoned due to rain and New South Wales were awarded the title for qualifying first. Interstate T20 matches were introduced and Andrews took 2/51 from a total of eight overs in two matches.

Andrews was retained for Australia's international engagements against England and New Zealand at the end of the season. She started poorly, conceding 49 runs from five wicketless overs in an eight-wicket defeat at the hands of the Australian Under-21 team in a warm-up match at Kardinia Park in Geelong. Andrews failed to take a wicket in the one-off T20 international, and then conceded 29 runs from four overs before scoring 10 runs from as many balls in the first ODI as Australia lost by 56 runs. She was then dropped. She was recalled for the final ODI, taking 1/31 in a 41-run win, ending the series with one wicket at 60.00 at an economy rate of 4.61. In the one-off Test in Bowral, Andrews batted at No. 9 and scored six as Australia were bowled out for 154. She then took 0/24 from 11 overs as England made 244 to take a 90-run lead. In the second innings, Andrews made nine not out as Australia declared at 9/231 to set the visitors a target of 142. She then took 0/9 from four overs as Australia lost by six wickets.

The Australians then travelled to New Zealand for the Rose Bowl series held at the Bert Sutcliffe Oval in Lincoln. In the solitary T20 match, she scored 10 not out as Australia managed only 9/80 and took 0/15 from four overs in a four-wicket defeat. It was the first time in four T20 internationals that she had conceded less than 6.50 runs per over. Andrews played in four of the five ODI matches, taking 3/45 from nine overs in the final match to help set up an eight-wicket win. She ended the series with six wickets at 19.83 and a relatively high economy rate of 4.57 and also scored eight runs at 4.00.

== Omission and recall for the 2009 World Cup and World Twenty20 ==
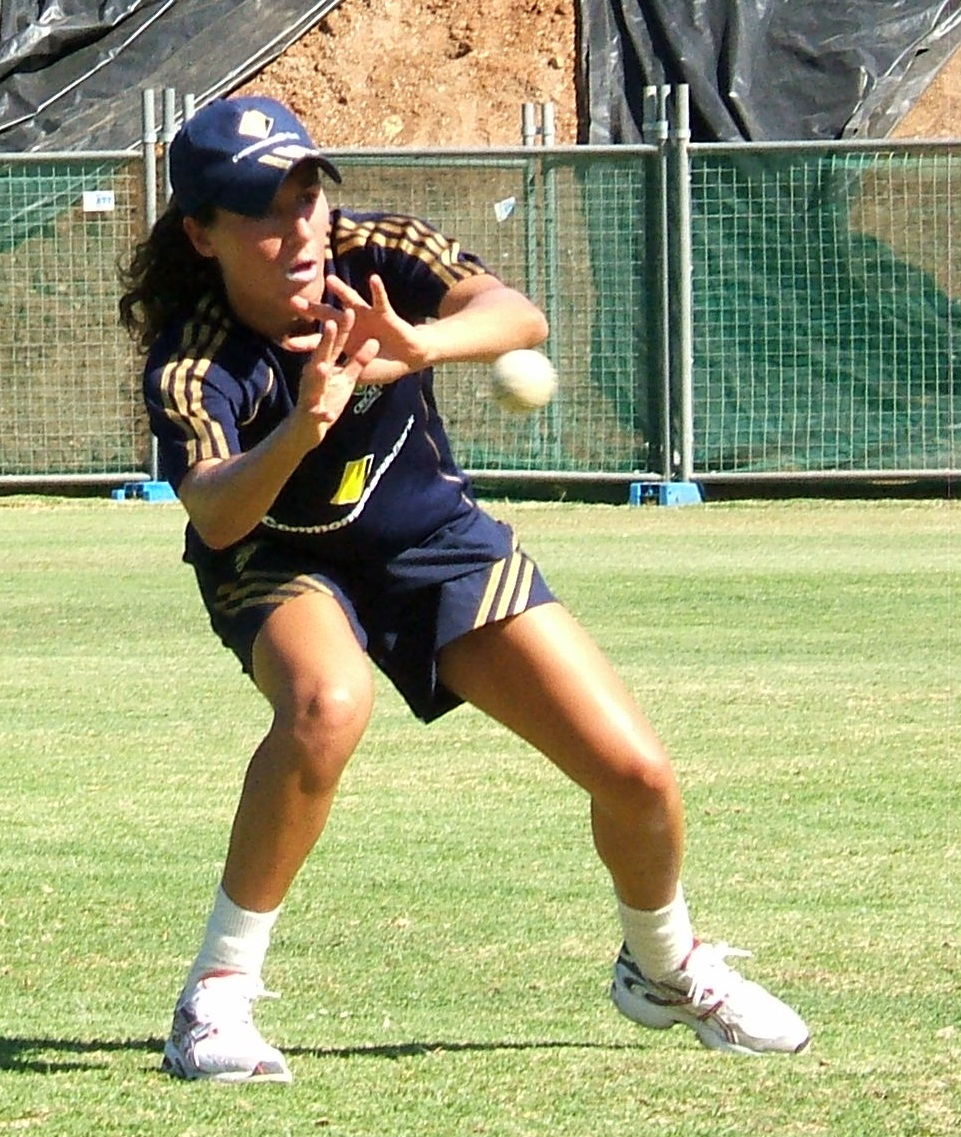
Andrews about to take a catch at training.

Andrews was dropped from the Australia team for the home series against India before the start of the 2008–09 WNCL season. She responded by taking 12 wickets in the first six matches of the WNCL season, including a haul of 3/23 in an eight-wicket win over Western Australia and 3/43 in a losing cause against South Australia. In these six matches, she conceded 3.10 runs per over. She was unable to maintain this form throughout the season, going wicketless in the final two round-robin matches against Victoria, which New South Wales won to earn hosting rights for the final. Andrews then took 1/11 from seven overs as New South Wales won by six wickets to take a fourth consecutive WNCL title. She ended with 13 wickets at 18.53 and an economy rate of 3.23 and made a duck in her only innings.

Andrews was also effective in New South Wales's two T20 matches, taking four wickets at 5.75 at and economy rate of 3.28.

Andrews' strong WNCL performances earned her a recall into the Australian team ahead of the 2009 Women's Cricket World Cup to be held in New South Wales and Canberra. Before the World Cup, the Australians headed to New Zealand for the Rose Bowl series. Andrews was called into the playing XI for the second match, but was ineffective taking 1/52 from ten overs. She was dropped before being recalled for the fourth match, taking 1/17 from four overs in a victory; the final ODI was washed out.

In two warm-up matches ahead of the World Cup, Andrews had promising results although she bowled only briefly. She took 1/7 from three overs against England and then took 2/12 from four overs against Sri Lanka, as the hosts won both matches.

Despite these results, Andrews was left out of the first two group matches against New Zealand and South Africa; Australia lost the first and won the latter and needed to win the last group match against the West Indies to ensure progression to the next round. Andrews took 1/34 from eight overs as Australia took a 47-run win. However, she was substantially more expensive than her colleagues—the run rate in the remaining 42 overs was 3.14—and was dropped for the first Super Six match against India, which Australia lost by 18 runs. She was recalled and took 1/20 from 7.1 overs against Pakistan in a 107-run win. By this time, Australia's two losses had already made it impossible to make the final. Andrews took 3/35 from 8.3 overs in the final super Six match against England, which Australia won by eight wickets, and they met India in the third-place playoff. Andrews batted for the only time in the tournament and was unbeaten on zero as Australia were out for 142. She took 0/23 from five overs as the hosts lost by three wickets. Andrews ended the World Cup with five wickets at 22.40 and an economy rate of 3.90.

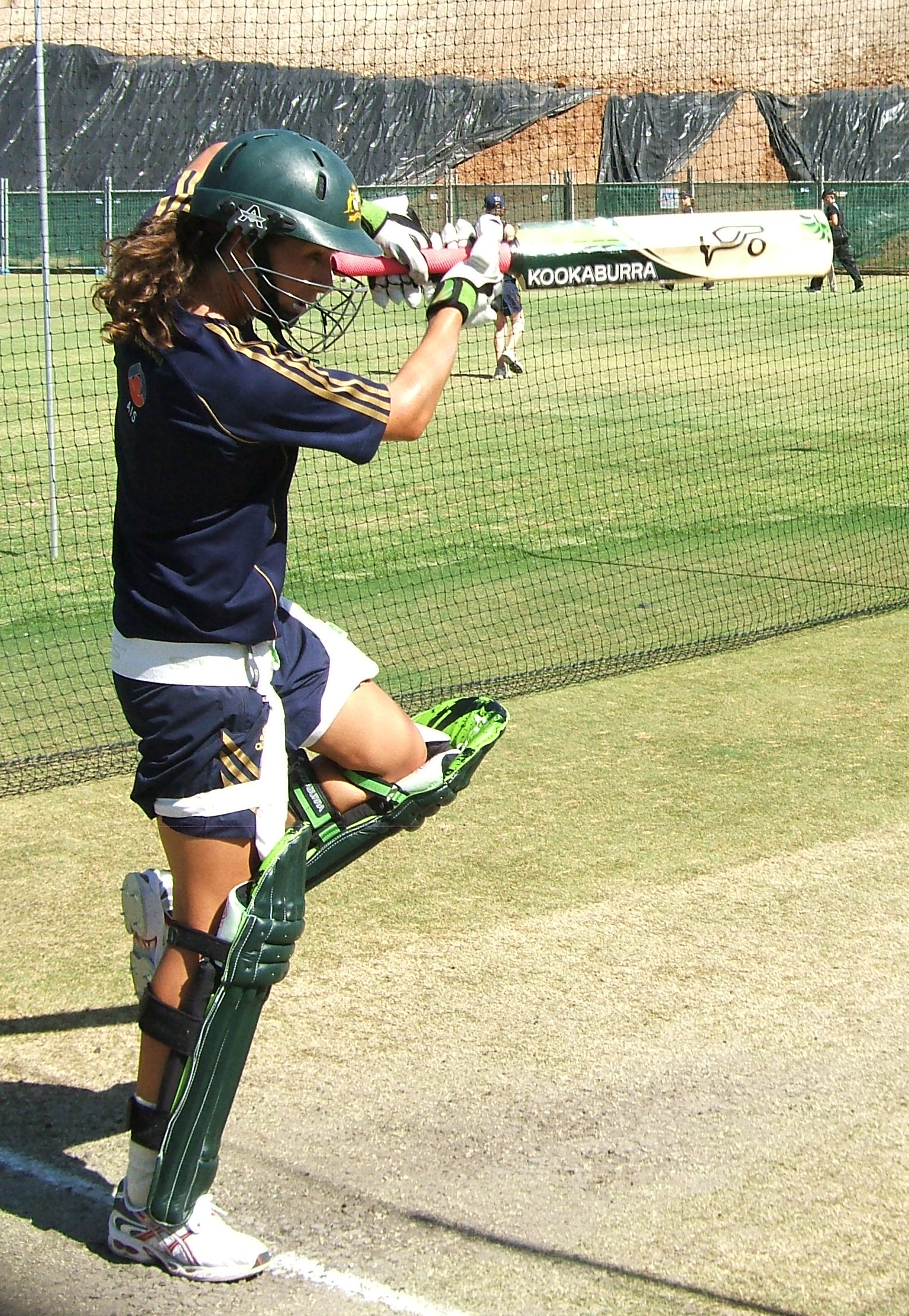
Andrews playing a cut shot at training.

Andrews was selected for Australia's team for the inaugural Women's World Twenty20 held in England in 2009. The Australians hosted New Zealand for a three-match series in tropical Darwin at the beginning of June before the World Cup, and Andrews showed good form taking five wickets at 11.40 at an economy rate of only 5.70, with a best of 3/13 from three overs in the final match, helping Australia seal the series 2–1. However, she could not maintain the form. She took 0/31 from three overs in the team's only warm-up on English soil, against the hosts, and was retained for all the matches, despite taking only two wickets at 43.50 and taking an economy rate of 7.56. Andrews took 0/25 from three overs in a nine-wicket loss to New Zealand, but was retained for the match against the Western Indies, taking 2/19 from four overs in an eight-wicket win. She was again attacked in the group match against South Africa, taking 0/19 from two overs in a 24-run win that qualified Australia for the semi-finals. Andrews was retained and was again ineffective, taking 0/24 from 2.3 overs as the hosts won by eight wickets to reach the final, which they won. She did not bat in any of the matches in Australia or England.

Andrews and the Australians stayed in England for a bilateral series against the hosts, who were the reigning world champions in both ODIs and T20s, after the end of the World Twenty20. She took 1/20 from her four overs as Australia upset England in the only T20 by 34 runs. She played in all of the five ODIs, taking eight wickets at 17.62 at an economy rate of 4.54 with a best of 4/50 from ten overs in the fourth match. She also scored 19 runs at 9.50, including 16 from 36 balls batting at No. 11 in the first match at Chelmsford which could not prevent a nine-wicket defeat.

England won all the ODI matches except the last, which was washed out. Andrews played in the one-off Test at County Road in Worcestershire. Batting at No. 11, she scored 11 from 14 balls in Australia's 309, before taking 1/32 from an economical display of 20.3 overs to help Australia take a 41-run lead. Having caught Lydia Greenway early in the innings, she then bowled the final English batsman Laura Marsh for 38, ending a last-wicket partnership of 59. She then made 4 not out as Australia were bowled out for 231 to set the hosts a target of 273 before the match was drawn. She took 1/22—dismissing opener Caroline Atkins for a duck—from 13 overs in the second innings, meaning that she had conceded less than two runs per over throughout the match.

== Final season ==
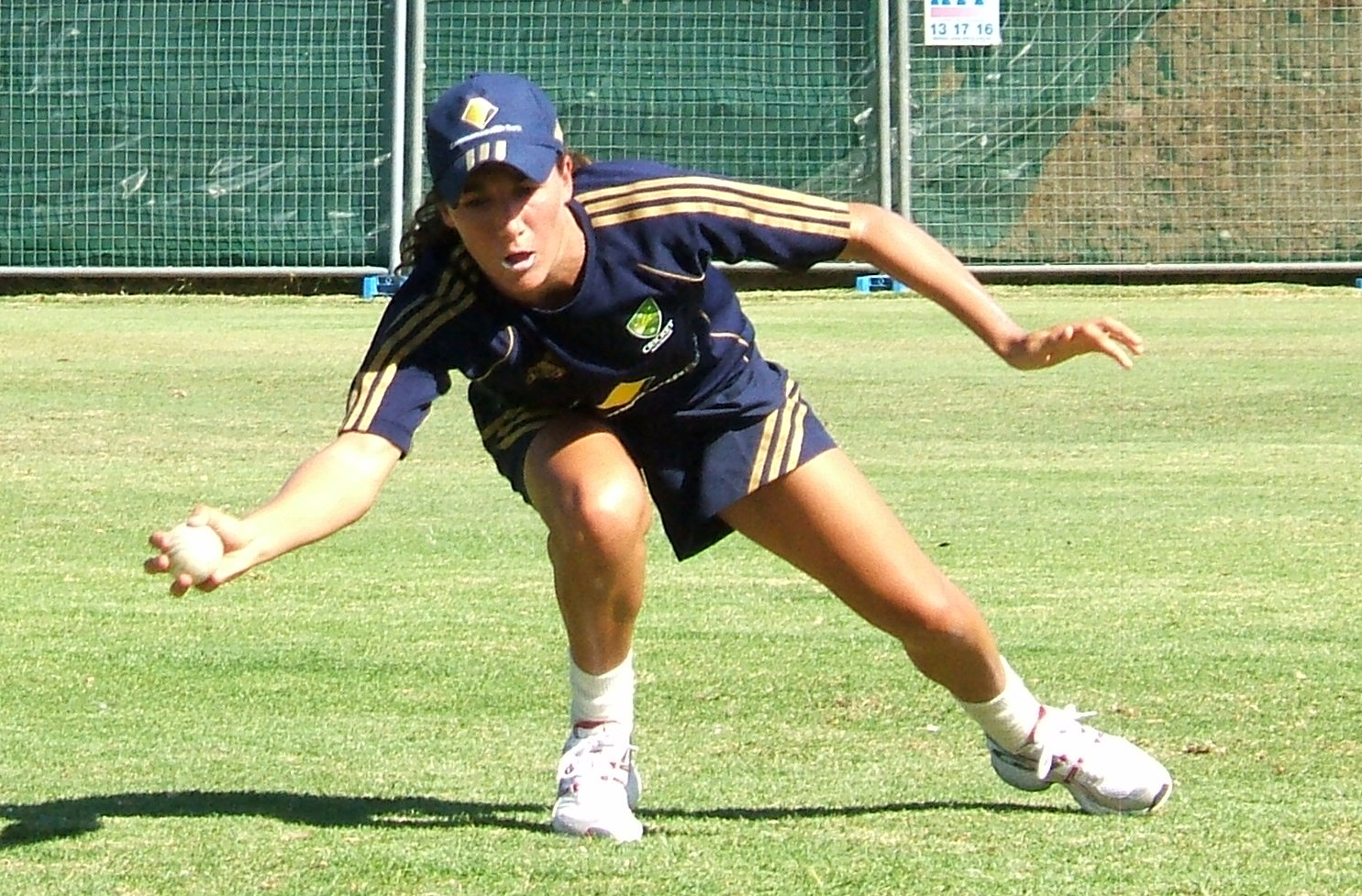
Andrews takes a one-handed catch at training.

In the first match of the 2009–10 WNCL season, Andrews scored 22 to push New South Wales to 198 before taking 0/28 from seven overs in a 15-run win. The following day, she took 3/26 in a 19-run win. After taking only one wicket in the two matches against the Australian Capital Territory, Andrews claimed 2/21 and 3/29 in the two matches against Victoria. She took only one wicket in the double-header against Western Australia before taking 2/8 from six overs and 1/33 in the last two matches against South Australia, which New South Wales won to qualify for the final. Andrews scored two not out as the defending champions batted first and made 9/206. She then took 1/18 from 5.1 overs as they bowled the Victorians out for 147 to claim a fifth successive WNCL title. Andrews finished the season with 14 wickets at 19.28 and an economy rate of 3.22. She scored 42 runs at 14.00 for the season.

During the season, the T20 matches were expanded into a six-round competition and final. Andrews played in all of New South Wales' seven matches and took five wickets at 21.20 and an economy rate of 4.60; she added 21 runs at 21.00. Her best bowling of 2/22 came from four overs in the qualifying match against Victoria, which New South Wales lost by seven runs. The two teams met again in the final and Andrews took 1/12 from four overs including a maiden as Victoria reached 5/127. In reply, Andrews made 15, one of the few batsmen to reach double figures as New South Wales capitulated for 75 and lost the title-deciding match.

In the 2010 Rose Bowl series after the WNCL, Andrews played in the first four of the five ODIs during the Australian leg of the competition. She took 2/18 and 2/20, both from five overs as Australia won both of the matches at the Adelaide Oval. The series then moved to the Junction Oval in Melbourne and Andrews took 1/12 from four overs and 2/29 from nine overs in the next two matches. She was not required to bat and ended with seven wickets at 11.28 at an economy rate of 3.43 as Australia completed a clean sweep.

The ODIs were followed by five T20 internationals, three at Bellerive Oval in Hobart and the last two in New Zealand. Andrews played in all but the last match, but had little success, taking one wicket at 97.00 and an economy rate of 6.46 and she batted once, scoring one not out. New Zealand won all five T20s. Andrews then played in all three ODIs on New Zealand soil, taking one wicket in each match as Australia completed a clean sweep. She ended with three wickets at 38.00 at an economy rate of 4.07.

Upon returning to Australia, Andrews retired from competitive cricket. She took 54 ODI wickets at 21.14, ranking her equal ninth among all Australians.
