= Natalee Scripps =

New Zealand cricketer (born 1978)

Personal information
- Full name: Natalee Scripps
- Born: 9 December 1978 (age 47); Auckland, New Zealand
- Batting: Right-handed
- Bowling: Right-arm medium
- Role: Bowler

International information
- National side: New Zealand (2003–2005)
- Only Test (cap 119): 27 November 2003 v India
- ODI debut (cap 98): 4 December 2003 v India
- Last ODI: 28 March 2005 v Ireland

Domestic team information
- Years: Team
- 1999/00–2010/11: Auckland

Career statistics
| Competition | WTest | WODI | WLA | T20 |
|---|---|---|---|---|
| Matches | 1 | 7 | 106 | 16 |
| Runs scored | 10 | 12 | 357 | 17 |
| Batting average | – | – | 11.90 | 3.40 |
| 100s/50s | 0/0 | 0/0 | 0/0 | 0/0 |
| Top score | 10* | 9* | 37* | 8 |
| Balls bowled | 180 | 302 | 5,275 | 343 |
| Wickets | 0 | 6 | 168 | 12 |
| Bowling average | – | 34.33 | 17.57 | 29.00 |
| 5 wickets in innings | 0 | 0 | 3 | 0 |
| 10 wickets in match | 0 | n/a | 0 | 0 |
| Best bowling | 0/57 | 2/17 | 6/18 | 2/13 |
| Catches/stumpings | 0/– | 0/– | 16/— | 0/– |
- Source: CricketArchive, 19 April 2021

Natalee Scripps (born 9 December 1978) is a New Zealand former cricketer who played as a right-arm medium bowler. She appeared in 1 Test match and 7 One Day Internationals for New Zealand between 2003 and 2005. She played domestic cricket for Auckland.
