= Amanda Green (cricketer) =

New Zealand cricketer (born 1984)

Personal information
- Full name: Amanda Jayne Green
- Born: 19 March 1984 (age 42); Tūrangi, New Zealand
- Batting: Right-handed
- Bowling: Right-arm medium
- Role: Bowler

International information
- National side: New Zealand (2003–2004)
- ODI debut (cap 92): 26 January 2003 v Australia
- Last ODI: 15 August 2004 v England
- Only T20I (cap 4): 5 August 2004 v England

Domestic team information
- Years: Team
- 2000/01–2005/06: Wellington
- 2007/08: Auckland
- 2009/10: Otago

Career statistics
Competition	WODI	WT20I	WLA	WT20
Matches	14	1	80	7
Runs scored	23	3	137	4
Batting average	7.66	3.00	6.52	2.00
100s/50s	0/0	0/0	0/0	0/0
Top score	17*	3	17*	3
Balls bowled	651	24	1,185	159
Wickets	12	2	78	4
Bowling average	32.66	10.00	23.05	41.00
5 wickets in innings	1	0	1	0
10 wickets in match	0	0	0	0
Best bowling	5/15	2/20	5/15	2/20
Catches/stumpings	3/–	0/–	9/–	0/–
- Source: CricketArchive, 17 November 2021

Amanda Jayne Green (born 19 March 1984) is a New Zealand former cricketer who played as a right-arm medium bowler. She appeared in fourteen One Day Internationals and one Twenty20 International for New Zealand between 2003 and 2004. She played domestic cricket for Wellington, Auckland and Otago.
