= Beth McNeill =

New Zealand cricketer (born 1982)

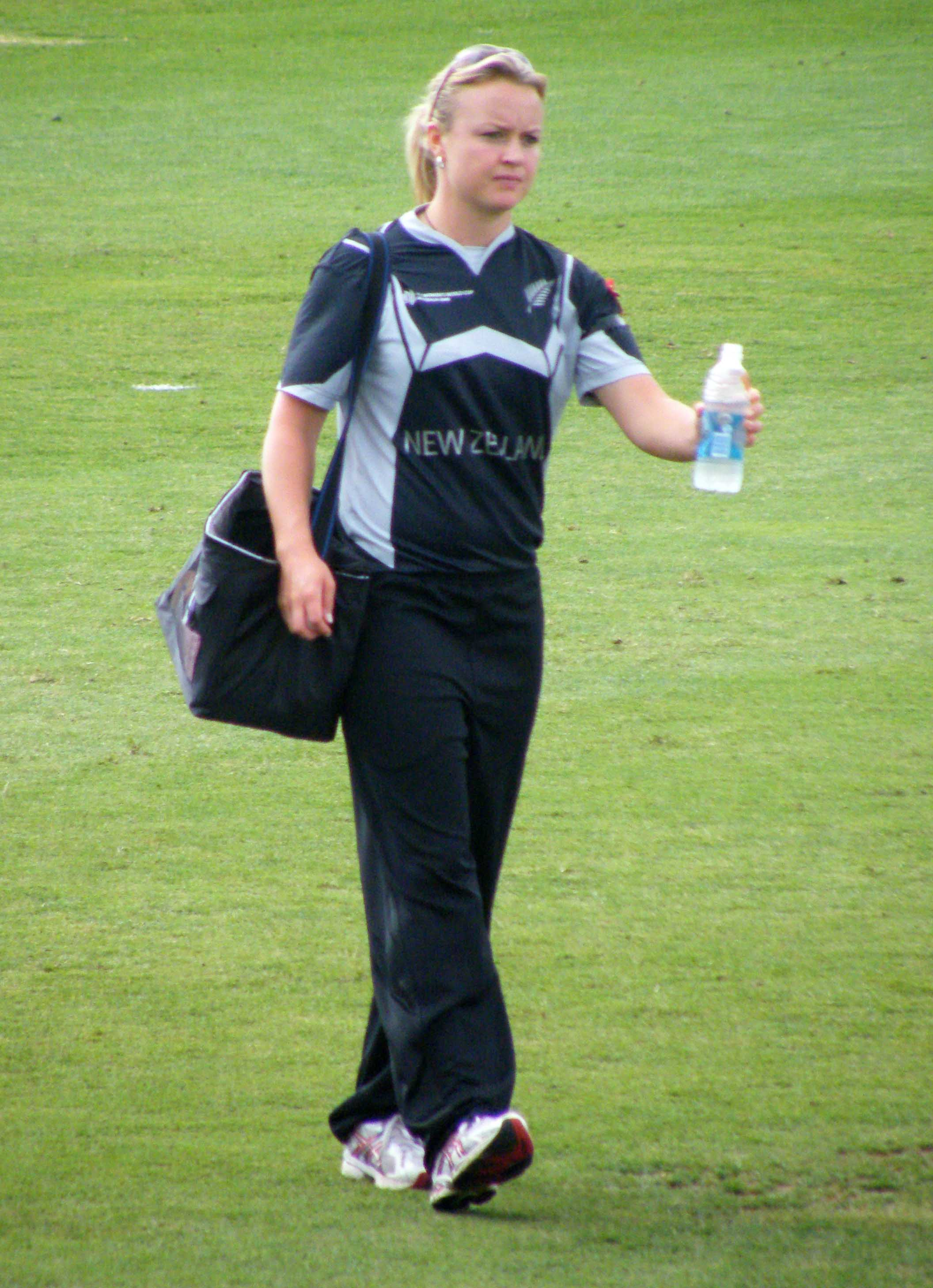
- Beth McNeill in 2009.

Personal information
- Full name: Beth Hannah McNeill
- Born: 10 November 1982 (age 44); Wellington, New Zealand
- Batting: Right-handed
- Bowling: Right-arm medium
- Role: All-rounder

International information
- National side: New Zealand (2004–2009)
- ODI debut (cap 99): 15 February 2004 v Australia
- Last ODI: 19 March 2009 v Pakistan
- T20I debut (cap 16): 19 July 2007 v Australia
- Last T20I: 15 February 2009 v Australia

Domestic team information
- Years: Team
- 1999/00–2000/01: Otago
- 2001/02–2008/09: Canterbury

Career statistics
Competition	WODI	WT20I	WLA	WT20
Matches	23	2	124	12
Runs scored	193	–	1,168	9
Batting average	19.30	–	19.14	2.25
100s/50s	0/1	–	0/3	0/0
Top score	88*	–	88*	5
Balls bowled	1,051	30	5,604	231
Wickets	23	0	154	7
Bowling average	29.56	–	21.83	32.85
5 wickets in innings	1	0	3	0
10 wickets in match	0	0	0	0
Best bowling	6/32	–	6/31	2/16
Catches/stumpings	8/–	0/–	35/–	2/–
- Source: CricketArchive, 12 April 2021

Beth Hannah McNeill (born 10 November 1982) is a former New Zealand cricketer who played as a right-arm medium bowler and right-handed batter. She appeared in 23 One Day Internationals and 2 Twenty20 Internationals for New Zealand between 2004 and 2009. McNeill played domestic cricket for Otago and Canterbury.
