= Maia Lewis =

New Zealand cricketer (born 1970)

Maia Lewis MNZM
Personal information
- Full name: Maia Ann Mereana Lewis
- Born: 20 June 1970 (age 56); Christchurch, New Zealand
- Batting: Right-handed
- Bowling: Right-arm medium
- Role: Batter

International information
- National side: New Zealand (1992–2005)
- Test debut (cap 96): 11 January 1992 v England
- Last Test: 21 August 2004 v England
- ODI debut (cap 58): 19 January 1992 v Australia
- Last ODI: 7 April 2005 v India
- Only T20I (cap 5): 5 August 2004 v England

Domestic team information
- Years: Team
- 1987/88: Southern Districts
- 1988/89–1992/93: Canterbury
- 1993/94: North Harbour
- 1994/95–2005/06: Wellington

Career statistics
Competition	WTest	WODI	WT20I	WLA
Matches	9	78	1	197
Runs scored	252	1,372	25	4,497
Batting average	21.00	22.49	25.00	29.01
100s/50s	0/2	1/4	0/0	3/23
Top score	65	105	25	105
Balls bowled	–	30	–	942
Wickets	–	0	–	17
Bowling average	–	–	–	34.41
5 wickets in innings	–	0	–	0
10 wickets in match	–	0	–	0
Best bowling	–	–	–	2/14
Catches/stumpings	6/–	30/–	0/–	67/–
- Source: CricketArchive, 15 April 2021

Maia Ann Mereana Lewis MNZM (born 20 June 1970) is a New Zealand former cricketer who played as a right-handed batter. She appeared in 9 Test matches, 78 One Day Internationals and 1 Twenty20 International for New Zealand between 1992 and 2005. She captained in 1997 and between 2003 and 2005. She played domestic cricket for Southern Districts, Canterbury, North Harbour and Wellington. Lewis also represented New Zealand in Hockey, and Indoor Cricket, making her a triple international athlete.

She retired from cricket in 2005. In the 2006 Queen's Birthday Honours, Lewis was appointed a Member of the New Zealand Order of Merit, for services to women's cricket.

Post-retirement, Lewis has worked as Auckland cricket Women's Cricket Manager and Auckland Hearts coach from 2006 to 2012. And later in various other sporting roles, including with the Halberg Disability Sport Foundation, and on the boards of Blind Sport New Zealand and Northland Cricket Association.
