= Rebecca Steele (cricketer) =

New Zealand cricketer (born 1985)

Personal information
- Full name: Rebecca Jayne Steele
- Born: 2 January 1985 (age 41); Christchurch, Canterbury, New Zealand
- Batting: Right-handed
- Bowling: Slow left-arm orthodox, Left-arm medium
- Role: Bowler

International information
- National side: New Zealand (2003–2005)
- Test debut (cap 120): 27 November 2003 v India
- Last Test: 21 August 2004 v England
- ODI debut (cap 94): 28 January 2003 v India
- Last ODI: 7 April 2005 v India
- Only T20I (cap 8): 5 August 2004 v England

Domestic team information
- Years: Team
- 2000/01–2005/06: Canterbury

Career statistics
Competition	WTest	WODI	WT20I	WLA
Matches	2	32	1	81
Runs scored	16	41	–	100
Batting average	5.33	6.83	–	7.14
100s/50s	0/0	0/0	–/–	0/0
Top score	12	8*	–	13*
Balls bowled	426	1,758	24	4,271
Wickets	8	34	0	101
Bowling average	17.62	24.44	–	18.54
5 wickets in innings	1	0	0	1
10 wickets in match	0	0	0	0
Best bowling	5/79	3/10	–	6/8
Catches/stumpings	3/–	6/–	2/–	26/–
- Source: CricketArchive, 17 April 2021

Rebecca Jayne Steele (born 2 January 1985) is a New Zealand former cricketer who played as a slow left-arm orthodox bowler. She appeared in 2 Test matches, 32 One Day Internationals and 1 Women's Twenty20 International for New Zealand between 2003 and 2005. She is one of thirteen cricketers to have taken a five-wicket haul on their debut in women's Test cricket, taking 5/79 against India. She played domestic cricket for Canterbury.
