= Aimee Watkins =

New Zealand cricketer (born 1982)

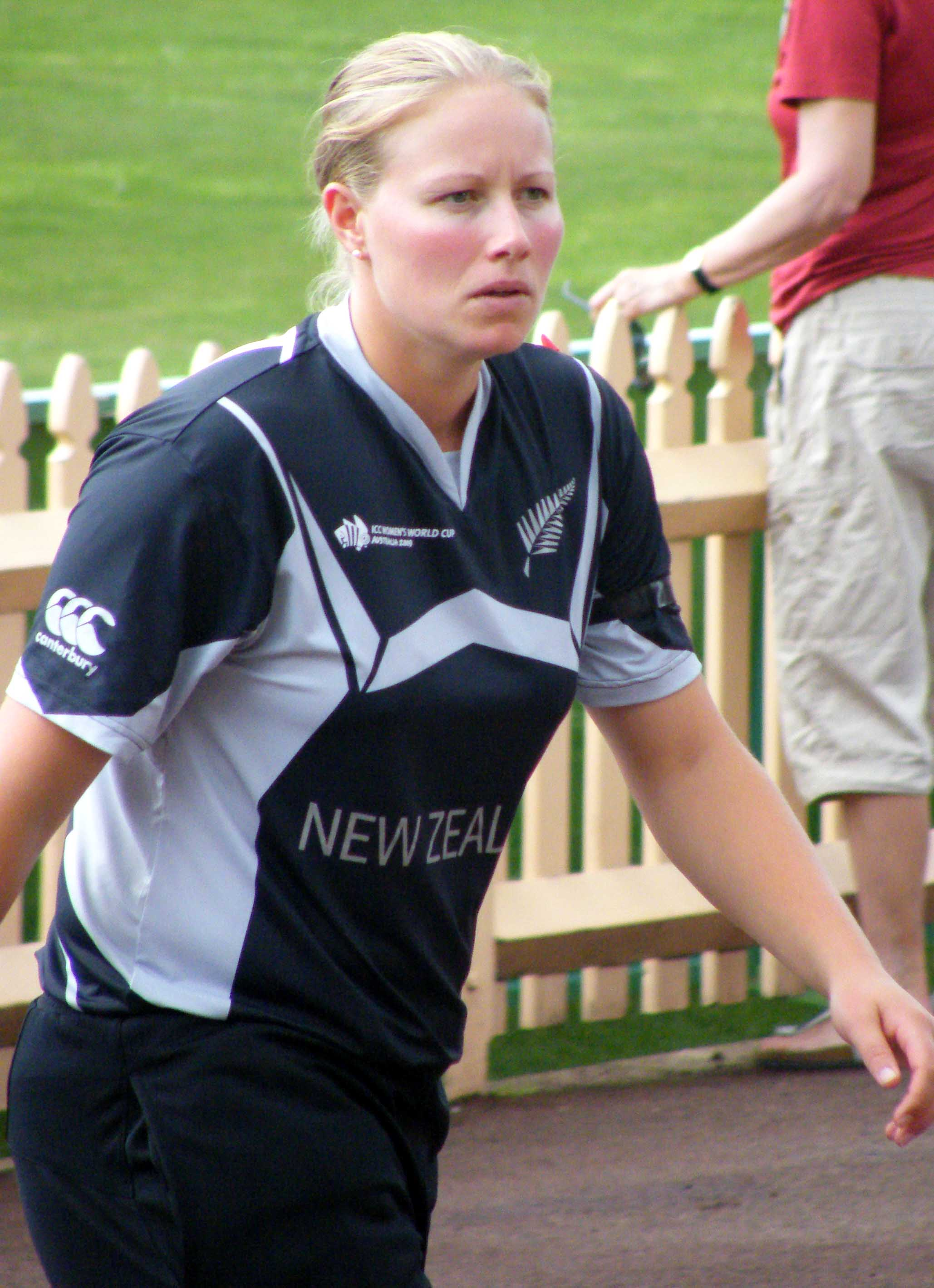

Personal information
- Full name: Aimee Louise Watkins
- Born: 11 October 1982 (age 44); New Plymouth, New Zealand
- Batting: Left-handed
- Bowling: Right-arm off break
- Role: All-rounder

International information
- National side: New Zealand (2002–2011)
- Test debut (cap 122): 27 November 2003 v India
- Last Test: 21 August 2004 v England
- ODI debut (cap 87): 20 February 2002 v Australia
- Last ODI: 7 July 2011 v India
- T20I debut (cap 10): 5 August 2004 v England
- Last T20I: 27 June 2011 v India

Domestic team information
- Years: Team
- 1998/99–2010/11: Central Districts
- 2004: Sussex
- 2010: Devon

Career statistics
Competition	WTest	WODI	WT20I	WLA
Matches	2	103	36	237
Runs scored	15	1,889	772	5,094
Batting average	7.50	21.71	23.39	26.53
100s/50s	0/0	2/6	0/3	5/19
Top score	14	111	89*	188
Balls bowled	249	4,394	507	10,436
Wickets	3	92	22	249
Bowling average	35.00	31.08	23.59	25.04
5 wickets in innings	0	0	0	1
10 wickets in match	0	0	0	0
Best bowling	2/68	4/2	3/8	5/25
Catches/stumpings	2/–	37/–	14/–	102/–
- Source: CricketArchive, 9 April 2021

Aimee Louise Watkins (née Mason; born 11 October 1982) is a New Zealand former cricketer who played as an all-rounder.

== Career ==
Watkins appeared in 2 Test matches, 103 One Day Internationals and 36 Twenty20 Internationals for New Zealand between 2002 and 2011. She played domestic cricket for Central Districts, as well as spending seasons with Sussex and Devon.

Born in New Plymouth, Watkins is a left-handed batter and right arm off spin bowler. She debuted in senior cricket as a 13-year-old New Plymouth Girls' High School student and joined the Central Hinds team in the 1998–99 season.

She developed into a genuine all-rounder during her career and was New Zealand's leading wicket-taker at the 2009 Women's Cricket World Cup with 11, including a best performance of 4 for 2 against South Africa.

Watkins along with Suzie Bates holds the record for the highest 2nd wicket partnership in WT20I history (118*)

She became captain of New Zealand following the 2009 World Cup upon the retirement of Haidee Tiffen.

In June 2011, she announced her retirement from international cricket.

== Awards ==
Watkins was inducted as a member of the Taranaki Sports Hall of Fame in November 2025. She is also a life member of the Taranaki Cricket Association and Woodleigh Cricket Club in New Plymouth. She is an honorary member of New Zealand Cricket and has Honorary Life Member of the Marylebone Cricket Club

== Post-playing career ==
Her contributions beyond playing include coaching, managing, commentating and serving on the board of the Taranaki Cricket Association.

Watkins is a teacher and was heading the primary industries programme at Francis Douglas Memorial College in 2025.

== One Day International centuries ==
Runs	Match	Opponents	City	Venue	Year
102	58	Australia	Darwin, Australia	Gardens Oval	2007
111	64	England	Blackpool, England	Stanley Park	2007

== See also ==
- List of centuries in women's One Day International cricket
