= Sara McGlashan =

New Zealand cricketer (born 1982)

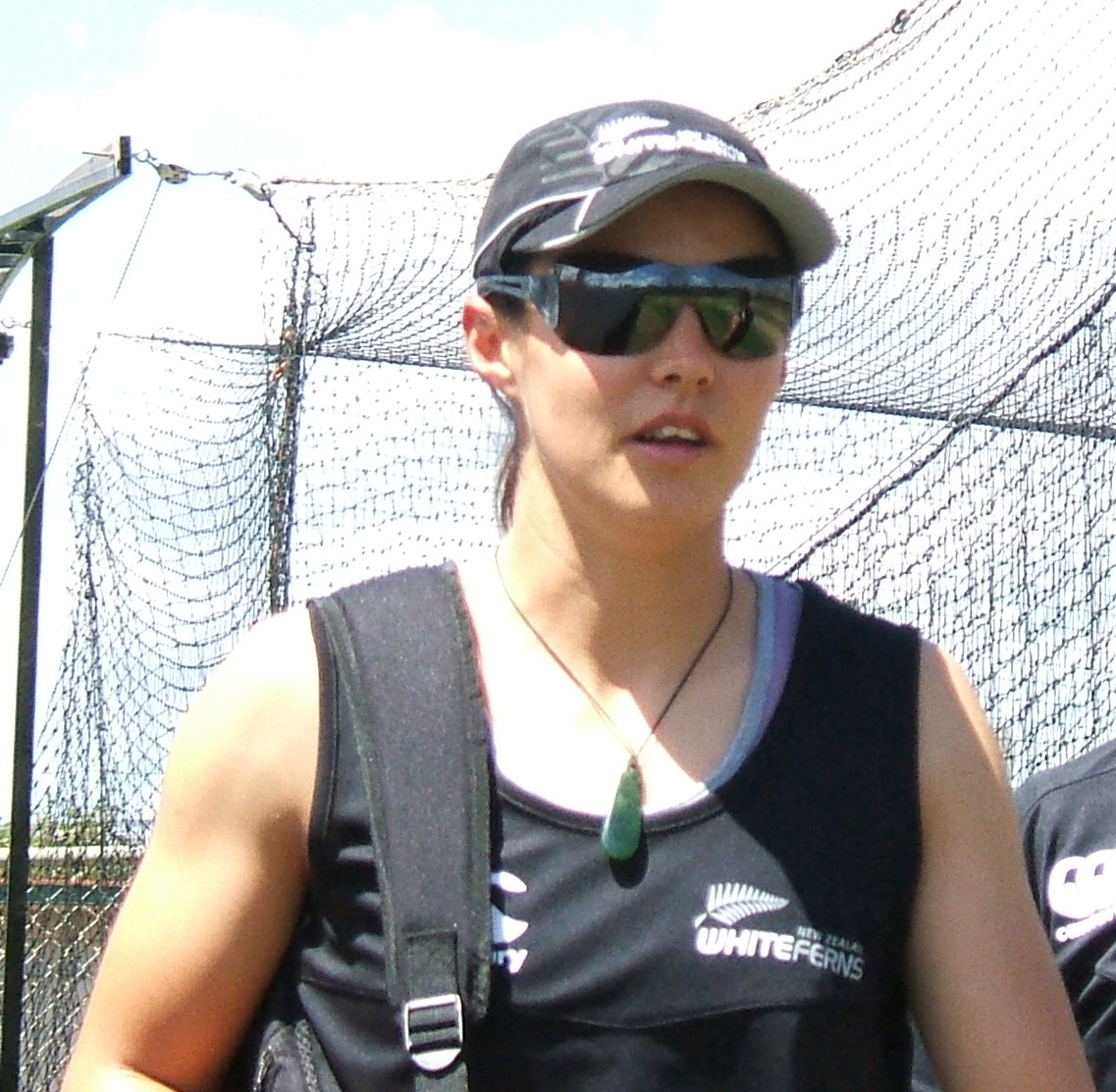

Personal information
- Full name: Sara Jade McGlashan
- Born: 28 March 1982 (age 44); Napier, Hawke's Bay, New Zealand
- Batting: Right-handed
- Role: Wicket-keeper
- Relatives: Peter McGlashan (brother); Robin Schofield (grandfather)

International information
- National side: New Zealand (2002–2016)
- Test debut (cap 115): 27 November 2003 v India
- Last Test: 21 August 2004 v England
- ODI debut (cap 91): 26 June 2002 v Netherlands
- Last ODI: 24 February 2016 v Australia
- T20I debut (cap 6): 5 August 2004 v England
- Last T20I: 31 March 2016 v West Indies

Domestic team information
- Years: Team
- 1998/99–2012/13: Central Districts
- 2013/14–2018/19: Auckland
- 2014/15–2016/17: Australian Capital Territory
- 2015/16–2018/19: Sydney Sixers
- 2016: Sussex
- 2016–2018: Southern Vipers

Career statistics
Competition	WTest	WODI	WT20I	WLA
Matches	2	134	76	301
Runs scored	20	2,438	1,164	7,664
Batting average	10.00	22.36	18.18	31.80
100s/50s	0/0	0/11	0/2	6/47
Top score	14	97*	84	125
Catches/stumpings	0/–	37/0	29/–	81/6
- Source: Cricket Archive, 19 April 2021

Sara Jade McGlashan (born 28 March 1982) is a New Zealand former cricketer who played as a right-handed batter and wicket-keeper. She appeared in 2 Test matches, 134 One Day Internationals and 76 Twenty20 Internationals for New Zealand between 2002 and 2016. She played domestic cricket for Central Districts and Auckland in New Zealand, as well as having stints with Australian Capital Territory, Sydney Sixers, Sussex and Southern Vipers.

McGlashan along with Nicola Browne set the highest record 6th wicket partnership in the Women's World Cup history (139*). In 2016, she hit the final runs that secured the fightback for Sydney Sixers to qualify for the playoffs despite losing six games in a row to start the season. She is the sister of Peter McGlashan.
