= Clea Smith =

Australian cricketer

Personal information
- Full name: Clea Rosemary Smith
- Born: 6 January 1979 (age 47); Melbourne, Victoria, Australia
- Batting: Right-handed
- Bowling: Right-arm medium

International information
- National side: Australia (2000–2011)
- Only Test (cap 147): 9 August 2005 v England
- ODI debut (cap 90): 29 January 2000 v England
- Last ODI: 7 July 2011 v England
- T20I debut (cap 18): 19 July 2007 v New Zealand
- Last T20I: 27 June 2011 v England

Domestic team information
- Years: Team
- 1998/99–2011/12: Victoria

Career statistics
Competition	Test	ODI	T20I	LA
Matches	1	48	13	170
Runs scored	46	85	5	601
Batting average	23.00	14.16	1.25	15.02
100s/50s	0/0	0/0	0/0	0/0
Top score	42	27*	1*	39*
Balls bowled	72	2,198	300	8,486
Wickets	1	45	14	180
Bowling average	25.00	25.68	22.21	23.92
5 wickets in innings	0	0	0	2
10 wickets in match	0	0	0	0
Best bowling	1/25	4/32	3/23	5/10
Catches/stumpings	0/–	9/–	1/–	42/–
- Source: CricketArchive, 7 August 2025

Clea Rosemary Smith (born 6 January 1979) is an Australian former cricket player. She played in the Australian national cricket team in all three formats: Test, One Day International (ODI), and Twenty20 International (T20I). Smith is currently a Director on the Board of Cricket Australia.

== Cricket career ==
Smith played 165 domestic limited overs matches for the Victorian Spirit including 117 Women's National Cricket League (WNCL) games. She also played 37 Women's Twenty20 cricket matches. Smith was Vice Captain to Belinda Clark, Rachael Haynes, Sarah Elliott and Emma Ingles. In November 2007, she took a hat-trick bowling in a WNCL match against Western Australia. She finished the match with 5 wickets and conceded only 10 runs, which were the best bowling figures she achieved in her career. When she retired from cricket, she was one of only three bowlers to take a hat-trick in a WNCL match.

Smith played one test, 48 One Day Internationals and 13 Twenty20 Internationals for Australia. She holds the record for the highest ever test score made by a female cricketer in Women's cricket history batting at number 11 of 42 runs. She retired in May 2012 after a 14-year playing career. Smith is currently a Director on the Board of Cricket Australia.
