= Sarah Burke (cricketer) =

New Zealand cricketer (born 1982)

Personal information
- Full name: Sarah Kate Burke
- Born: 2 January 1982 (age 44); Christchurch, New Zealand
- Batting: Right-handed
- Bowling: Right-arm medium
- Role: Bowler

International information
- National side: New Zealand (2003–2008)
- Only Test (cap 123): 21 August 2004 v England
- ODI debut (cap 95): 3 February 2003 v England
- Last ODI: 15 March 2008 v Australia
- T20I debut (cap 2): 5 August 2004 v England
- Last T20I: 6 March 2008 v Australia

Domestic team information
- Years: Team
- 2000/01–2009/10: Canterbury
- 2005: Kent

Career statistics
Competition	WTest	WODI	WT20I	WLA
Matches	1	36	7	142
Runs scored	1	73	6	499
Batting average	–	8.11	6.00	9.59
100s/50s	0/0	0/0	0/0	0/0
Top score	1*	10*	3*	27
Balls bowled	114	1,536	138	6,339
Wickets	1	25	7	136
Bowling average	57.00	40.76	21.28	27.59
5 wickets in innings	0	0	0	0
10 wickets in match	0	0	0	0
Best bowling	1/57	3/17	3/15	4/28
Catches/stumpings	0/–	3/–	0/–	36/–
- Source: CricketArchive, 11 April 2021

Sarah Kate Burke (born 2 January 1982) is a New Zealand former cricketer who played as a right-arm medium bowler. She appeared in 1 Test match, 36 One Day Internationals and 7 Twenty20 Internationals for New Zealand between 2003 and 2008. She played domestic cricket for Canterbury, as well as spending one season with Kent.
