= Helen Watson (cricketer) =

New Zealand cricketer (born 1972)

Personal information
- Full name: Helen Maree Watson
- Born: 17 February 1972 (age 54); Ashburton, New Zealand
- Batting: Right-handed
- Bowling: Right-arm medium
- Role: All-rounder

International information
- National side: New Zealand (1999–2008)
- ODI debut (cap 78): 21 February 1999 v Australia
- Last ODI: 16 March 2008 v Australia
- T20I debut (cap 11): 5 August 2004 v England
- Last T20I: 6 March 2008 v Australia

Domestic team information
- Years: Team
- 1996/97–1999/00: Canterbury
- 2000/01–2005/06: Auckland
- 2006/07–2008/09: Canterbury

Career statistics
Competition	WODI	WT20I	WLA	WT20
Matches	66	8	211	14
Runs scored	580	16	3,265	55
Batting average	15.26	16.00	28.14	27.50
100s/50s	1/0	0/0	2/9	0/0
Top score	115*	9*	115*	15*
Balls bowled	2,487	168	8,512	312
Wickets	54	7	210	8
Bowling average	23.83	21.71	21.13	30.00
5 wickets in innings	0	0	2	0
10 wickets in match	0	0	0	0
Best bowling	3/14	3/13	5/18	3/13
Catches/stumpings	21/–	2/–	61/–	2/–
- Source: CricketArchive, 11 July 2021

Helen Maree Watson (born 17 February 1972) is a New Zealand former cricketer who played as an all-rounder, bowling right-arm medium and batting right-handed. She appeared in 66 One Day Internationals and 8 Twenty20 Internationals for New Zealand between 1999 and 2008. She played domestic cricket for Canterbury and Auckland. Following her playing career, Watson became a financial officer.
