= Louise Milliken =

New Zealand cricketer

Personal information
- Full name: Louise Elizabeth Milliken
- Born: 19 September 1983 (age 43); Morrinsville, New Zealand
- Batting: Right-handed
- Bowling: Right-arm fast-medium
- Role: Bowler

International information
- National side: New Zealand (2002–2007)
- Test debut (cap 117): 27 November 2003 v India
- Last Test: 21 August 2004 v England
- ODI debut (cap 89): 3 March 2002 v Australia
- Last ODI: 5 March 2007 v Australia
- Only T20I (cap 14): 18 October 2006 v Australia

Domestic team information
- Years: Team
- 1999/00-2008/09: Northern Districts

Career statistics
Competition	WTest	WODI	WT20I	WLA
Matches	2	47	1	125
Runs scored	10	110	–	714
Batting average	5.00	11.00	–	12.98
100s/50s	0/0	0/0	–	0/1
Top score	6	21	–	60*
Balls bowled	198	2,220	24	5,712
Wickets	2	59	1	134
Bowling average	36.50	23.88	28.00	26.83
5 wickets in innings	0	1	0	1
10 wickets in match	0	0	0	0
Best bowling	2/49	5/25	1/28	5/25
Catches/stumpings	0/–	13/–	0/–	31/–
- Source: CricketArchive, 18 April 2021

Louise Elizabeth Milliken (born 19 September 1983) is a New Zealand former cricketer who played as a right-arm fast-medium bowler. She appeared in 2 Test matches, 47 One Day Internationals and 1 Twenty20 International for New Zealand between 2002 and 2007. She played domestic cricket for Northern Districts.
