= Nicola Browne =

New Zealand cricketer

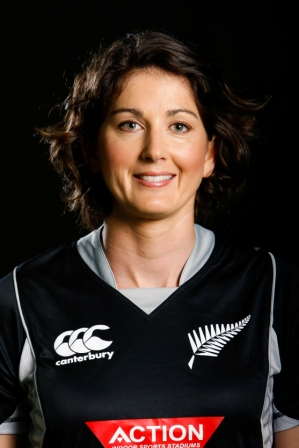

Personal information
- Full name: Nicola Jane Browne
- Born: 14 September 1983 (age 43); Matamata, Waikato, New Zealand
- Batting: Right-handed
- Bowling: Right-arm medium
- Role: All-rounder

International information
- National side: New Zealand (2002–2014)
- Test debut (cap 113): 27 November 2003 v India
- Last Test: 21 August 2004 v England
- ODI debut (cap 85): 20 February 2002 v Australia
- Last ODI: 26 February 2014 v West Indies
- T20I debut (cap 1): 5 August 2004 v England
- Last T20I: 2 April 2014 v Sri Lanka

Domestic team information
- Years: Team
- 1999/00–2014/15: Northern Districts
- 2013/14–2014/15: Australian Capital Territory

Career statistics
Competition	WTest	WODI	WT20I	WLA
Matches	2	125	54	278
Runs scored	24	2,002	552	6,128
Batting average	12.00	27.05	16.23	32.77
100s/50s	0/0	0/10	0/0	4/38
Top score	23	63	34*	115
Balls bowled	210	4,571	876	11,446
Wickets	1	88	47	246
Bowling average	83.00	34.14	17.31	31.45
5 wickets in innings	0	0	0	1
10 wickets in match	0	0	0	0
Best bowling	1/43	4/20	4/15	5/31
Catches/stumpings	2/–	33/–	24/–	89/–
- Source: CricketArchive, 20 April 2021

Nicola Jane Browne (born 14 September 1983) is a New Zealand former cricketer who played as an all-rounder, batting right-handed and bowling right-arm medium. She appeared in 2 Test matches, 125 One Day Internationals and 54 Twenty20 Internationals for New Zealand between 2002 and 2014. She played domestic cricket for Northern Districts and Australian Capital Territory.

She played in the 2005 and 2009 Women's Cricket World Cups, and was player of the series in the 2010 ICC Women's World Twenty20 tournament. In 2007, Browne and Sarah Tsukigawa set the highest 7th wicket partnership in WODI history, 104*. She also set the record 6th wicket partnership in Women's World Cup history, 139*, with Sara McGlashan in 2009. In January 2015, Browne announced her retirement from all forms of cricket.

Browne was included in the 2007 Waikato Bay of Plenty Magic netball squad.
