= Maria Fahey =

New Zealand cricketer

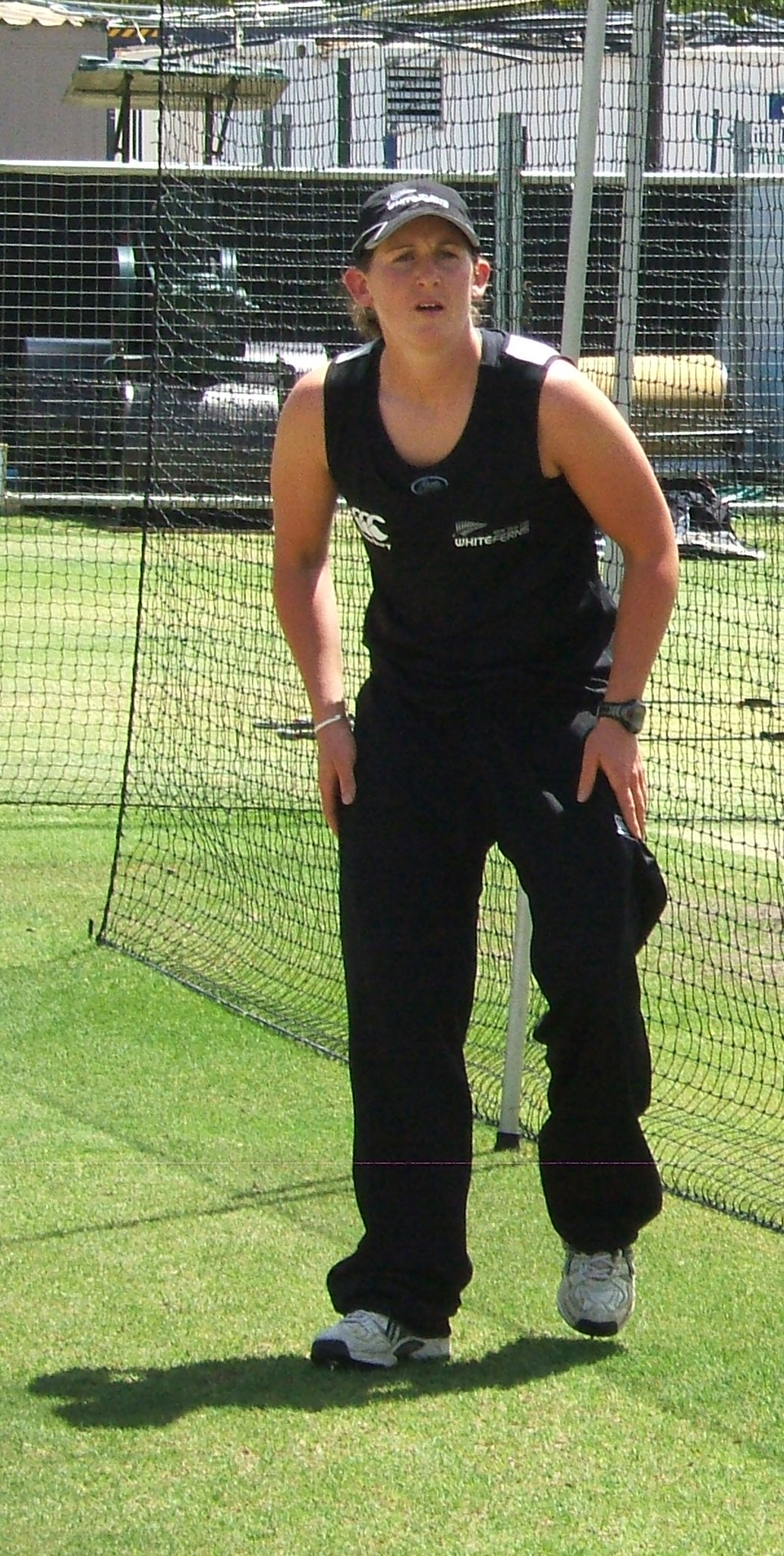

Personal information
- Full name: Maria Frances Fahey
- Born: 5 March 1984 (age 42); Timaru, Canterbury, New Zealand
- Batting: Left-handed
- Bowling: Right-arm off break
- Role: Batter

International information
- National side: New Zealand (2003–2010)
- Test debut (cap 114): 27 November 2003 v India
- Last Test: 21 August 2004 v England
- ODI debut (cap 96): 4 December 2003 v India
- Last ODI: 20 July 2010 v England
- T20I debut (cap 13): 18 October 2006 v Australia
- Last T20I: 1 July 2010 v England

Domestic team information
- Years: Team
- 2000/01–2010/11: Canterbury

Career statistics
Competition	WTest	WODI	WT20I	WLA
Matches	2	54	8	158
Runs scored	125	1,403	134	3,623
Batting average	41.66	27.50	22.33	26.44
100s/50s	0/1	0/14	0/0	0/31
Top score	60*	91	43	91
Balls bowled	–	–	–	674
Wickets	–	–	–	18
Bowling average	–	–	–	23.83
5 wickets in innings	–	–	–	0
10 wickets in match	–	–	–	0
Best bowling	–	–	–	4/21
Catches/stumpings	1/–	15/–	1/–	43/–
- Source: CricketArchive, 14 April 2021

Maria Frances Fahey (born 5 March 1984) is a New Zealand former cricketer who played as a left-handed batter. She appeared in 2 Test matches, 54 One Day Internationals and 8 Twenty20 Internationals for New Zealand between 2003 and 2010. She played domestic cricket for Canterbury.

Fahey was a member of the highly successful Timaru Girls' High School team during the late 1990s, and was part of the New Zealand Cricket Academy in 2002. Her first international tour, that of India in 2003, saw her average over 50 with the bat, making three half-centuries in the process. She is current coach of ACA Cricket Academy in Guntur, Andhra Pradesh.
