= India women's cricket team in England and Ireland in 2002 =

The India women's national cricket team toured England and Ireland in July and August 2002. The tour began with a tri-series between India, England and New Zealand, which was won by New Zealand. India then played against Ireland in three One Day Internationals, with India winning the series 2–0. Finally, India played England in two Test matches and one ODI, with England winning the ODI and the Test series being drawn 0–0.

== Tri-Series ==
=== Squads ===
England	India	New Zealand
Clare Connor (c); Arran Brindle; Charlotte Edwards; Mandie Godliman (wk); Isa Guha; Laura Harper; Laura Newton; Lucy Pearson; Melissa Reynard; Laura Spragg; Claire Taylor; Clare Taylor	Anjum Chopra (c); Neetu David; Jhulan Goswami; Bindeshwari Goyal; Hemlata Kala; Arundhati Kirkire; Mamatha Maben; Deepa Marathe; Sulakshana Naik (wk); Sunetra Paranjpe; Mithali Raj; Amita Sharma; Jaya Sharma; Sunita Singh	Emily Drumm (c); Nicola Browne; Anna Dodd; Fiona Fraser; Frances King; Sara McGlashan; Louise Milliken; Nicola Payne; Kate Pulford; Rachel Pullar; Kathryn Ramel; Rebecca Rolls (wk); Haidee Tiffen; Aimee Watkins

=== Tour matches ===
==== 50-over match: England Development Squad v India ====
6 July 2002
Scorecard

England Development Squad	v	India

Match Abandoned
Westhill Road, Shanklin
Umpires: Lorraine Elgar (Eng) and Valerie Gibbens (Eng)

- No toss.
- No play possible due to rain.

==== 50-over match: England Development Squad v India ====
15 July 2002
Scorecard

India; 201/4 (50 overs)	v	England Development Squad; 152 (49.2 overs)
Sunetra Paranjpe 90 (132); Dawn Holden 1/28 (10 overs)		Kathryn Leng 23 (57); Sunetra Paranjpe 3/29 (8.2 overs)

India Women won by 49 runs
The Racecourse, Durham
Umpires: Graham Cooper (Eng) and John Hayes (Eng)

- England Development Squad Women won the toss and elected to field.

=== Group stage ===
10 July 2002
Scorecard

India; 59 (35.2 overs)	v	England; 60/4 (30.2 overs)
Sulakshana Naik 9 (16); Laura Harper 4/11 (5 overs)		Charlotte Edwards 31* (84); Arundhati Kirkire 2/6 (3.2 overs)

England Women won by 6 wickets
Grainville, Saint Saviour, Jersey
Umpires: Jeff Evans (Eng) and John Hayes (Eng)

- England Women won the toss and elected to field.
- Points: England Women 4, India Women 0
- Sulakshana Naik (Ind) made her WODI debut.

11 July 2002
Scorecard

New Zealand; 168/9 (50 overs)	v	India; 26 (19.1 overs)
Emily Drumm 56 (93); Deepa Marathe 4/37 (10 overs)		Jhulan Goswami 6* (29); Rachel Pullar 5/10 (7 overs)

New Zealand Women won by 142 runs
Grainville, Saint Saviour, Jersey
Umpires: Jeff Evans (Eng) and John Hayes (Eng)

- India Women won the toss and elected to field.
- Points: New Zealand Women 4, India Women 0
- Sunetra Paranjpe (Ind) made her WODI debut.

17 July 2002
Scorecard

India; 95 (41.1 overs)	v	New Zealand; 96/5 (28.4 overs)
Mithali Raj 28 (60); Rachel Pullar 3/10 (8 overs)		Haidee Tiffen 30* (49); Neetu David 3/17 (7 overs)

New Zealand Women won by 5 wickets
The Racecourse, Durham
Umpires: Graham Cooper (Eng) and Tim Robinson (Eng)
Player of the match: Rachel Pullar (NZ)

- India Women won the toss and elected to bat.
- Points: New Zealand Women 4, India Women 0

19 July 2002
Scorecard

England	v	India

Match Abandoned
Riverside Ground, Chester-le-Street

- No toss.
- No play possible due to rain
- Points: England Women 2, India Women 2

== Tour of Ireland ==
Indian women's cricket team in Ireland in 2002
	Ireland	India
- Dates: 24 – 28 July 2002
Captains	Anne Linehan	Anjum Chopra

One Day International series
- Results: India won the 3-match series 2–0
Most runs	Miriam Grealey (46)	Arundhati Kirkire (58)
Most wickets	Marianne Herbert (3)	Sunetra Paranjpe (4)

=== Squads ===
Ireland	India
Anne Linehan (c) (wk); Caitriona Beggs; Miriam Grealey; Marianne Herbert; Barbara McDonald; Ciara Metcalfe; Laura Morgan; Clare O'Leary; Catherine O'Neill; Davina Pratt; Clare Shillington; Karen Young	Anjum Chopra (c); Neetu David; Jhulan Goswami; Bindeshwari Goyal; Hemlata Kala; Arundhati Kirkire; Mamatha Maben; Deepa Marathe; Sulakshana Naik (wk); Sunetra Paranjpe; Mithali Raj; Amita Sharma; Jaya Sharma; Sunita Singh

=== WODI Series ===
==== 1st ODI ====
24 July 2002
Scorecard

Ireland; 101/9 (50 overs)	v	India; 104/2 (24 overs)
Miriam Grealey 32 (–); Sunetra Paranjpe 4/8 (8 overs)		Jaya Sharma 52 (–); Marianne Herbert 2/20 (5 overs)

India Women won by 8 wickets
Rush Cricket Club Ground, Rush, County Dublin
Umpires: Peter Thew (Ire) and Louis Fourie (Ire)

- Ireland Women won the toss and elected to bat.
- Amita Sharma (Ind) made her WODI debut.

==== 2nd ODI ====
26 July 2002
Scorecard

India; 206/7 (50 overs)	v	Ireland; 62 (34 overs)
Arundhati Kirkire 58 (–); Davina Pratt 1/17 (6 overs)		Miriam Grealey 14 (–); Bindeshwari Goyal 3/3 (7 overs)

India Women won by 144 runs
Anglesea Road Cricket Ground, Dublin
Umpires: Brian Stein (Ire) and David Walsh (Ire)

- Ireland Women won the toss and elected to field.
- Laura Morgan (Ire) made her WODI debut.

==== 3rd ODI ====
28 July 2002
Scorecard

Ireland	v	India

Match Abandoned
Fox Lodge Cricket Club Ground, Strabane

- No toss.
- No play possible due to rain.

== Tour of England ==
Indian women's cricket team in England in 2002
	England	India
- Dates: 2 – 14 August 2002
Captains	Clare Connor	Anjum Chopra

Test series
- Result: 2-match series drawn 0–0
Most runs	Laura Newton (131)	Mithali Raj (214)
Most wickets	Nicky Shaw (3)	Neetu David (6)

One Day International series
- Results: England won the 1-match series 1–0
Most runs	Charlotte Edwards (54)	Hemlata Kala (38)
Most wickets	Clare Connor (3); Isa Guha (3)	Neetu David (2)

=== Squads ===
England	India
Clare Connor (c); Caroline Atkins; Charlotte Edwards; Mandie Godliman (wk); Isa Guha; Laura Harper; Dawn Holden; Kathryn Leng; Laura Newton; Melissa Reynard; Nicky Shaw; Claire Taylor; Clare Taylor	Anjum Chopra (c); Neetu David; Jhulan Goswami; Bindeshwari Goyal; Hemlata Kala; Arundhati Kirkire; Mamatha Maben; Deepa Marathe; Sulakshana Naik (wk); Sunetra Paranjpe; Mithali Raj; Amita Sharma; Jaya Sharma; Sunita Singh

=== Tour Matches ===
==== 50-over match: England Development Squad v India ====
2 August 2002
Scorecard

India; 128/9 (50 overs)	v	England Development Squad; 75 (40.1 overs)
Sunetra Paranjpe 37 (–); Sarah Clarke 3/24 (– overs)		Sunetra Paranjpe 4/17 (– overs)

India Women won by 53 runs
Sonning Lane, Reading

- England Development Squad Women won the toss and elected to field
- Full scorecard unavailable.

==== 50-over match: Marylebone Cricket Club v India ====
3 August 2002
Scorecard

India; 221/4 (50 overs)	v	Marylebone Cricket Club; 189 (46.4 overs)
Jaya Sharma 68 (118); Clare Connor 2/17 (10 overs)		Haidee Tiffen 49 (62); Neetu David 4/26 (10 overs)

India Women won by 32 runs
Bradfield College, Reading
Umpires: Debra Murray (Eng) and Ross Wood (Eng)

- Marylebone Cricket Club Women won the toss and elected to field

==== 50-over match: England Under-21s v India ====
5 August 2002
Scorecard

India; 167/6 (50 overs)	v	England Under-21s; 164 (49.1 overs)
Mamatha Maben 37* (48); Alexia Walker 2/19 (5 overs)		Sarah Collyer 47 (45); Sunita Singh 3/24 (10 overs)

India Women won by 3 runs
Sonning Lane, Reading
Umpires: Lorraine Elgar (Eng) and Jim Jenkinson (Eng)

- England Under-21s Women won the toss and elected to field

=== Test Series ===
==== 1st Test ====
8 – 11 August 2002
Scorecard

England	v	India

Match Abandoned
Denis Compton Oval, Shenley
Umpires: Ann Roberts (Eng) and Pasty Harris (Eng)

- No toss.
- No play possible due to rain.
- Match called off on Day 3, with the ODI at Beaconsfield scheduled instead for 11 August 2002.

==== 2nd Test ====
14 – 17 August 2002
Scorecard

England	v	India
329 (128 overs); Laura Newton 98 (197); Neetu David 4/71 (38 overs)		467 (177.1 overs); Mithali Raj 214 (407); Nicky Shaw 3/74 (27 overs)
198/6d (81 overs); Charlotte Edwards 56 (108); Neetu David 2/70 (27 overs

Match drawn
County Ground, Taunton
Umpires: Valerie Gibbens (Eng) and Vanburn Holder (WI)

- India Women won the toss and elected to field.
- Mandie Godliman, Isa Guha (Eng), Sulakshana Naik and Sunetra Paranjpe (Ind) all made their WTest debuts.

=== Only ODI ===
11 August 2002
Scorecard

India; 118 (49.5 overs)	v	England; 119/4 (38.2 overs)
Hemlata Kala 38 (75); Clare Connor 3/25 (9.5 overs)		Charlotte Edwards 54 (89); Neetu David 2/20 (7 overs)

England Women won by 6 wickets
Beaconsfield Cricket Club, Beaconsfield
Umpires: Ann Roberts (Eng) and Pasty Harris (Eng)

- India Women won the toss and elected to bat.

== See also ==
- 2002 Women's Tri-Series
