= 2002 Women's Tri-Series =

- Date: 10 – 20 July 2002
- Location: England
- Result: New Zealand won the tri-series
Teams
England	India	New Zealand
Captains
Clare Connor	Anjum Chopra	Emily Drumm
Most runs
Claire Taylor (40)	Mithali Raj (31)	Emily Drumm (134)
Most wickets
Laura Harper (6)	Deepa Marathe (5)	Rachel Pullar (12)

The 2002 Women's Tri-Series was a Women's One Day International (WODI) cricket tournament that was held in England in July 2002. It was a tri-nation series between England, India and New Zealand. It was part of India's tour of England and Ireland, and followed New Zealand's tour of Ireland and the Netherlands.

New Zealand progressed to the final after winning the group with three wins from four matches, joined by England, who finished second. The final was won by New Zealand by 63 runs, therefore winning the tournament.

== Squads ==
England	India	New Zealand
Clare Connor (c); Arran Brindle; Charlotte Edwards; Mandie Godliman (wk); Isa Guha; Laura Harper; Laura Newton; Lucy Pearson; Melissa Reynard; Laura Spragg; Claire Taylor; Clare Taylor	Anjum Chopra (c); Neetu David; Jhulan Goswami; Bindeshwari Goyal; Hemlata Kala; Arundhati Kirkire; Mamatha Maben; Deepa Marathe; Sulakshana Naik (wk); Sunetra Paranjpe; Mithali Raj; Jaya Sharma; Sunita Singh	Emily Drumm (c); Nicola Browne; Anna Dodd; Fiona Fraser; Frances King; Sara McGlashan; Louise Milliken; Nicola Payne; Kate Pulford; Rachel Pullar; Kathryn Ramel; Rebecca Rolls (wk); Haidee Tiffen; Aimee Watkins

== Points table ==
Team	Pld	W	L	T	NR	Pts
New Zealand (Q)	4	3	0	0	1	14
England (Q)	4	1	1	0	2	8
India	4	0	3	0	1	2

Source: ESPNcricinfo

== Fixtures ==
=== 1st ODI ===
10 July 2002
Scorecard

India; 59 (35.2 overs)	v	England; 60/4 (30.2 overs)
Sulakshana Naik 9 (16); Laura Harper 4/11 (5 overs)		Charlotte Edwards 31* (84); Arundhati Kirkire 2/6 (3.2 overs)

England Women won by 6 wickets
Grainville, Saint Saviour, Jersey
Umpires: Jeff Evans (Eng) and John Hayes (Eng)

- England Women won the toss and elected to field.
- Points: England Women 4, India Women 0
- Sulakshana Naik (Ind) made her WODI debut.

=== 2nd ODI ===
11 July 2002
Scorecard

New Zealand; 168/9 (50 overs)	v	India; 26 (19.1 overs)
Emily Drumm 56 (93); Deepa Marathe 4/37 (10 overs)		Jhulan Goswami 6* (29); Rachel Pullar 5/10 (7 overs)

New Zealand Women won by 142 runs
Grainville, Saint Saviour, Jersey
Umpires: Jeff Evans (Eng) and John Hayes (Eng)

- India Women won the toss and elected to field.
- Points: New Zealand Women 4, India Women 0
- Sunetra Paranjpe (Ind) made her WODI debut.

=== 3rd ODI ===
12 July 2002
Scorecard

England	v	New Zealand

Match Abandoned
Grainville, Saint Saviour, Jersey
Umpires: Jeff Evans (Eng) and John Hayes (Eng)

- No toss.
- No play possible due to rain.
- Points: England Women 2, New Zealand Women 2

=== 4th ODI ===
16 July 2002
Scorecard

England; 111 (38 overs)	v	New Zealand; 113/3 (31 overs)
Isa Guha 22* (26); Haidee Tiffen 2/8 (5 overs)		Emily Drumm 63* (81); Laura Spragg 1/20 (5 overs)

New Zealand Women won by 7 wickets
The Racecourse, Durham
Umpires: Graham Cooper (Eng) and Tim Robinson (Eng)

- England Women won the toss and elected to bat.
- Points: New Zealand Women 4, England Women 0

=== 5th ODI ===
17 July 2002
Scorecard

India; 95 (41.1 overs)	v	New Zealand; 96/5 (28.4 overs)
Mithali Raj 28 (60); Rachel Pullar 3/10 (8 overs)		Haidee Tiffen 30* (49); Neetu David 3/17 (7 overs)

New Zealand Women won by 5 wickets
The Racecourse, Durham
Umpires: Graham Cooper (Eng) and Tim Robinson (Eng)
Player of the match: Rachel Pullar (NZ)

- India Women won the toss and elected to bat.
- Points: New Zealand Women 4, India Women 0

=== 6th ODI ===
19 July 2002
Scorecard

England	v	India

Match Abandoned
Riverside Ground, Chester-le-Street

- No toss.
- No play possible due to rain
- Points: England Women 2, India Women 2

== Final ==
20 July 2002
Scorecard

New Zealand; 161 (48.5 overs)	v	England; 98 (43.4 overs)
Kate Pulford 55 (105); Isa Guha 3/28 (7.5 overs)		Claire Taylor 32 (81); Aimee Watkins 3/20 (10 overs)

New Zealand Women won by 63 runs
Riverside Ground, Chester-le-Street
Umpires: Lorraine Elgar (Eng) and Richard Kettleborough (Eng)
Player of the match: Kate Pulford (NZ)

- England Women won the toss and elected to field.
- New Zealand Women won the 2002 Women's Tri-Series

== See also ==
- Indian women's cricket team in England and Ireland in 2002
- New Zealand women's cricket team in Ireland and Netherlands in 2002
