= New Zealand women's cricket team in Ireland and the Netherlands in 2002 =

New Zealand women's cricket team in Netherlands in 2002
	Netherlands	New Zealand
- Dates: 25 – 28 June 2002
Captains	Carolien Salomons	Emily Drumm

One Day International series
- Results: New Zealand won the 3-match series 3–0
Most runs	Pauline te Beest (40)	Kate Pulford (131)
Most wickets	Carolien Salomons (4)	Aimee Watkins (7)

The New Zealand women's national cricket team toured the Netherlands and Ireland in June and July 2002. They played both sides in a three match One Day International series, beating the Netherlands 3–0 and Ireland 2–0. Following the tour, they played England and India in a tri-series in England.

== Tour of Netherlands ==
=== Squads ===
Netherlands	New Zealand
Carolien Salomons (c); Jolet Hartenhof; Mandy Kornet; Maartje Köster; Inge Leurs (wk); Marjolijn Molenaar; Cheraldine Oudolf; Helmien Rambaldo; Annemarie Tanke; Pauline te Beest; Minou Toussaint (wk); Eugenie van Leeuwen; Carly Verheul; Birgit Viguurs; Kirsten Zorab	Emily Drumm (c); Nicola Browne; Anna Dodd; Fiona Fraser; Frances King; Sara McGlashan (wk); Louise Milliken; Nicola Payne; Kate Pulford; Rachel Pullar; Kathryn Ramel; Rebecca Rolls (wk); Haidee Tiffen; Aimee Watkins

=== WODI Series ===
==== 1st ODI ====
25 June 2002
Scorecard

New Zealand; 245/7 (50 overs)	v	Netherlands; 76 (41 overs)
Nicola Payne 37 (66); Marjolijn Molenaar 3/38 (10 overs)		Pauline te Beest 23 (42); Rachel Pullar 3/10 (8 overs)

New Zealand Women won by 169 runs
Sportpark Maarschalkerweerd, Utrecht
Umpires: Bob van Keulen (Net) and GAJM Abbenhuis (Net)
Player of the match: Rachel Pullar (NZ)

- Netherlands Women won the toss and elected to field.

==== 2nd ODI ====
26 June 2002
Scorecard

New Zealand; 335/4 (50 overs)	v	Netherlands; 87 (35 overs)
Kate Pulford 95 (78); Birgit Viguurs 1/25 (5 overs)		Helmien Rambaldo 19 (23); Aimee Watkins 4/26 (8 overs)

New Zealand Women won by 248 runs
VRA Cricket Ground, Amstelveen
Umpires: PA Christiaans (Net) and Zeth Ali (Net)
Player of the match: Kate Pulford (NZ)

- Netherlands Women won the toss and elected to field.
- Inge Leurs (Net), Fiona Fraser and Sara McGlashan (NZ) all made their WODI debuts.

==== 3rd ODI ====
28 June 2002
Scorecard

New Zealand; 263/5 (45 overs)	v	Netherlands; 53 (27.1 overs)
Haidee Tiffen 87 (89); Carolien Salomons 2/30 (7 overs)		Annemarie Tanke 14 (63); Kate Pulford 4/5 (3.1 overs)

New Zealand Women won by 210 runs
Sportpark Maarschalkerweerd, Utrecht
Umpires: Frans de Leede (Net) and JBM Kors (Net)
Player of the match: Haidee Tiffen (NZ)

- New Zealand Women won the toss and elected to bat.
- Match reduced to 45 overs per side due to rain.

== Tour of Ireland ==
New Zealand women's cricket team in Ireland in 2002
	Ireland	New Zealand
- Dates: 1 – 6 July 2002
Captains	Anne Linehan	Emily Drumm

One Day International series
- Results: New Zealand won the 3-match series 2–0
Most runs	Caitriona Beggs (59)	Rebecca Rolls (174)
Most wickets	Catherine O'Neill (4)	Haidee Tiffen (5)

=== Squads ===
Ireland	New Zealand
Anne Linehan (c) (wk); Caitriona Beggs; Miriam Grealey; Marianne Herbert; Isobel Joyce; Barbara McDonald; Ciara Metcalfe; Clare O'Leary; Catherine O'Neill; Davina Pratt; Clare Shillington; Karen Young	Emily Drumm (c); Nicola Browne; Anna Dodd; Fiona Fraser; Frances King; Sara McGlashan (wk); Louise Milliken; Nicola Payne; Kate Pulford; Rachel Pullar; Kathryn Ramel; Rebecca Rolls (wk); Haidee Tiffen; Aimee Watkins

=== WODI Series ===
==== 1st ODI ====
1 July 2002
Scorecard

New Zealand; 249/6 (42 overs)	v	Ireland; 18/1 (6.1 overs)
Rebecca Rolls 88 (70); Davina Pratt 2/41 (7 overs)		Clare O'Leary 12* (23); Rachel Pullar 1/9 (3.1 overs)

No result
Castle Avenue, Dublin
Umpires: Louie Fourie (Ire) and Ronnie O'Reilly (Ire)

- New Zealand Women won the toss and elected to bat.
- No further play possible due to rain.

==== 2nd ODI ====
3 July 2002
Scorecard

Ireland; 176 (47 overs)	v	New Zealand; 179/2 (30.3 overs)
Caitriona Beggs 56 (108); Frances King 4/27 (7 overs)		Rebecca Rolls 86 (83); Catherine O'Neill 2/43 (10 overs)

New Zealand Women won by 8 wickets
Malahide Cricket Club Ground, Malahide
Umpires: Peter Thew (Ire) and Stu Daultrey (Ire)

- Ireland Women won the toss and elected to bat.

==== 3rd ODI ====
6 July 2002
Scorecard

Ireland; 90 (38.1 overs)	v	New Zealand; 91/1 (20.4 overs)
Catherine O'Neill 39* (88); Nicola Browne 4/20 (10 overs)		Haidee Tiffen 33 (33); Catherine O'Neill 1/8 (4 overs)

New Zealand Women won by 9 wickets
College Park, Dublin
Umpires: Gerry Lyons (Ire) and Nigel Parnell (Ire)

- Ireland Women won the toss and elected to bat.
- Marianne Herbert (Ire) made her WODI debut.
