= India women's cricket team in Australia and New Zealand in 2005–06 =

Indian women's cricket team toured Australia and New Zealand in month February–March 2006. The tour included one Women's Test match against Australia, series of 3 Women's One Day Internationals against Australia and series of 5 Women's One Day Internationals against New Zealand. India lost the Test match by an innings, and the ODI series by 3–0 against Australia and 4–1 against New Zealand.

== Squads ==
Australia	India	New Zealand
Karen Rolton (c) Lisa Sthalekar (v/c) Sarah Andrews Alex Blackwell Kate Blackwell Melissa Bulow Cathryn Fitzpatrick Michelle Goszko Julie Hayes Shelley Nitschke Kirsten Pike Jodie Purves(w/k) Clea Smith	Mithali Raj (c) Nooshin Al Khadeer Anjum Chopra Neetu David Rumeli Dhar Jhulan Goswami Karuna Jain Reema Malhotra Sulakshana Naik Devika Palshiker Sunetra Paranjpe Amita Sharma Jaya Sharma Monica Sumra	Haidee Tiffen (c) Suzie Bates Nicola Browne Sarah Burke Anna Dodd Emily Drumm Maria Fahey Sara McGlashan Aimee Mason Louise Milliken Rebecca Rolls Sarah Tsukigawa Helen Watson

== Only Test ==
18 February 2006
Scorecard

Australia	v	India
250 (102.4 overs); Lisa Sthalekar 72 (180); Jhulan Goswami 4/43 (24 overs)		93 (64.2 overs); Karu Jain 21 (47); Cathryn Fitzpatrick 3/24 (15 overs)
		153 (107.5 overs); Rumeli Dhar 38 (143); Lisa Sthalekar 5/30 (20.5 overs)

Australia Women won by an innings and 4 runs
Adelaide Oval, Adelaide
Player of the match: Lisa Sthalekar (Aus)

- India Women won the toss and elected to field.
- Jodie Fields, Melissa Bulow and Sarah Andrews (Australia Women); Devika Palshikar (India Women) made Test debut

== Australia - India WODI series ==
=== 1st ODI ===
25 February 2006
Scorecard

India; 89 (42.3 overs)	v	Australia; 90/4 (31 overs)
Amita Sharma 24 (54); Cathryn Fitzpatrick 5/29 (8.3 overs)		Karen Rolton 47 (72); Jhulan Goswami 3/6 (9 overs)

Australia won by 6 wickets
St Peters College, Adelaide
Umpires: Andy Collins (Aus) and Simon Fry (Aus)

- Australia won the toss and elected to field.
- Jodie Fields (Aus) made her ODI debut.

=== 2nd ODI ===
26 February 2006
Scorecard

Australia; 173 (49 overs)	v	India; 161 (47.5 overs)
Michelle Goszko 47 (74); Nooshin Al Khadeer 4/41 (10 overs)		Anjum Chopra 66 (91); Karen Rolton 4/29 (8.5 overs)

Australia won by 12 runs
St Peters College, Adelaide
Umpires: Andy Collins (Aus) and Andrew Willoughby (Aus)

- India won the toss and elected to field.
- Sarah Andrews (Aus) made her ODI debut.

=== 3rd ODI ===
28 February 2006
Scorecard

India; 128/7 (50 overs)	v	Australia; 129/1 (34.2 overs)
Reema Malhotra 27(62)*; Karen Rolton 2/6 (6 overs)		Alex Blackwell 63 (118)*; Jhulan Goswami 1/19 (7 overs)

Australia won by 9 wickets
Woodville Oval, Adelaide
Umpires: Simon Fry (Aus) and Andrew Willoughby (Aus)

- Australia won the toss and elected to field.

== India - New Zealand WODI series ==
=== 1st ODI ===
4 March 2006
Scorecard

India; 117/8 (34 overs)	v	New Zealand; 118/3 (22.1 overs)
Amita Sharma 25 (26); Aimee Watkins 4/23 (6 overs)		Rebecca Rolls 45 (35); Neetu David 2/24 (7 overs)

New Zealand won by 7 wickets
Bert Sutcliffe Oval, Lincoln
Umpires: Gary Baxter (NZ) and Robert Anderson (NZ)

- New Zealand won the toss and elected to field.
- Match has been reduced to 34 overs due to rain.
- Suzie Bates (NZ) made her ODI debut.

=== 2nd ODI ===
6 March 2006
Scorecard

India; 157/7 (50 overs)	v	New Zealand; 158/5 (28.2 overs)
Jaya Sharma 30 (52); Anna Dodd 2/19 (10 overs)		Haidee Tiffen 66 (61); Devika Palshikar 2/25 (4 overs)

New Zealand won by 5 wickets
Bert Sutcliffe Oval, Lincoln
Umpires: Gary Baxter (NZ) and Tony Hill (NZ)

- New Zealand won the toss and elected to field.
- Sarah Tsukigawa (NZ) made her ODI debut.

=== 3rd ODI ===
9 March 2006
Scorecard

New Zealand; 184/6 (50 overs)	v	India; 185/7 (48.2 overs)
Emily Drumm 94 (147)*; Rumeli Dhar 3/33 (10 overs)		Anjum Chopra 60 (77); Nicola Browne 2/32 (9 overs)

India won by 3 wickets
Bert Sutcliffe Oval, Lincoln
Umpires: Evan Watkin (NZ) and Tony Hill (NZ)

- New Zealand won the toss and elected to bat.

=== 4th ODI ===
11 March 2006
Scorecard

New Zealand; 272/7 (50 overs)	v	India; 175 (48.2 overs)
Emily Drumm 83 (97); Jhulan Goswami 3/49 (10 overs)		Anjum Chopra 43 (59); Sarah Tsukigawa 2/24 (10 overs)

New Zealand won by 97 runs
Bert Sutcliffe Oval, Lincoln
Umpires: Evan Watkin (NZ) and Tony Hill (NZ)

- New Zealand won the toss and elected to bat.

=== 5th ODI ===
13 March 2006
Scorecard

New Zealand; 272/7 (50 overs)	v	India; 62 (28.2 overs)
Haidee Tiffen 79 (97); Neetu David 3/44 (10 overs)		Karuna Jain 19 (21); Sarah Burke 3/17 (10 overs)

New Zealand won by 210 runs
Bert Sutcliffe Oval, Lincoln
Umpires: Evan Watkin (NZ) and Tony Hill (NZ)

- New Zealand won the toss and elected to bat.
