= 2001–02 Rose Bowl series =

Women's cricket series

2001–02 Rose Bowl
	Australia	New Zealand
- Dates: 20 February – 6 March 2002
Captains	Belinda Clark	Emily Drumm

One Day International series
- Results: Australia won the 6-match series 5–1
Most runs	Karen Rolton (330)	Rebecca Rolls (219)
Most wickets	Cathryn Fitzpatrick (11)	Haidee Tiffen (12)
- Player of the series: Karen Rolton (Aus)

Total points
- Australia 14, New Zealand 2

The 2001–02 Rose Bowl series was a women's cricket series held in Australia and New Zealand in February and March 2002. Australia and New Zealand played each other in six One Day Internationals, three in each country, with a points system to determine the winner. Australia won five out of the six matches, gaining 14 points to win the series.

== Squads ==
Australia	New Zealand
Belinda Clark (c); Sally Cooper; Michelle Goszko; Julie Hayes; Cathryn Fitzpatrick; Mel Jones; Lisa Keightley; Emma Liddell; Terry McGregor; Julia Price (wk); Karen Rolton; Clea Smith; Lisa Sthalekar	Emily Drumm (c); Nicola Browne; Anna Dodd; Paula Flannery; Frances King; Louise Milliken; Nicola Payne; Rachel Pullar; Kathryn Ramel; Rebecca Rolls (wk); Anna Smith; Haidee Tiffen; Aimee Watkins; Helen Watson

== Points table ==
Team	Pld	WH	WA	L	BP	Pts
Australia (C)	6	3	2	1	2	14
New Zealand	6	1	0	5	0	2

- Note: Teams were awarded 2 points for a home win and 3 points for an away win.
- Source: CricketArchive

== New Zealand in Australia ==
=== 1st ODI ===
20 February 2002
Scorecard

Australia; 204/7 (50 overs)	v	New Zealand; 151 (46.4 overs)
Mel Jones 40 (82); Haidee Tiffen 3/32 (8 overs)		Rebecca Rolls 61 (67); Cathryn Fitzpatrick 2/13 (7.4 overs)

Australia Women won by 53 runs
Adelaide Oval, Adelaide
Umpires: Daryl Harper (Aus) and Steve Davis (Aus)

- New Zealand Women won the toss and elected to field.
- Emma Liddell (Aus), Nicola Browne, Anna Dodd and Aimee Watkins (NZ) all made their WODI debuts.
- Points: Australia Women 3 (Bonus 1), New Zealand Women 0

=== 2nd ODI ===
21 February 2002 (D/N)
Scorecard

New Zealand; 163 (49.4 overs)	v	Australia; 166/7 (47.3 overs)
Haidee Tiffen 40 (80); Cathryn Fitzpatrick 4/15 (10 overs)		Karen Rolton 32 (34); Aimee Watkins 3/29 (10 overs)

Australia Women won by 3 wickets
Adelaide Oval, Adelaide
Umpires: Daryl Harper (Aus) and Steve Davis (Aus)

- New Zealand Women won the toss and elected to bat.
- Points: Australia Women 2, New Zealand Women 0

=== 3rd ODI ===
23 February 2002
Scorecard

Australia; 194/6 (50 overs)	v	New Zealand; 137/8 (50 overs)
Karen Rolton 44 (64); Haidee Tiffen 4/43 (10 overs)		Paula Flannery 36 (108); Julie Hayes 3/17 (10 overs)

Australia Women won by 57 runs
Melbourne Cricket Ground, Melbourne
Umpires: Bob Parry (Aus) and Richard Patterson (Aus)

- Australia Women won the toss and elected to bat.
- Frances King (NZ) made her WODI debut.
- Points: Australia Women 3 (Bonus 1), New Zealand Women 0

== Australia in New Zealand ==
=== 4th ODI ===
2 March 2002
Scorecard

New Zealand; 196/9 (50 overs)	v	Australia; 174/9 (50 overs)
Emily Drumm 88 (121); Terry McGregor 3/44 (9 overs)		Belinda Clark 43 (82); Aimee Watkins 4/33 (10 overs)

New Zealand Women won by 22 runs
Bert Sutcliffe Oval, Lincoln
Umpires: Billy Bowden (NZ) and Gary Baxter (NZ)

- New Zealand Women won the toss and elected to bat.
- Points: New Zealand Women 2, Australia Women 0

=== 5th ODI ===
3 March 2002
Scorecard

Australia; 218/5 (50 overs)	v	New Zealand; 201/8 (50 overs)
Karen Rolton 90 (100); Haidee Tiffen 2/49 (8 overs)		Haidee Tiffen 69 (96); Clea Smith 2/32 (7 overs)

Australia Women won by 17 runs
Bert Sutcliffe Oval, Lincoln
Umpires: Dave Quested (NZ) and Gary Baxter (NZ)

- Australia Women won the toss and elected to bat.
- Louise Milliken (NZ) made her WODI debut.
- Points: Australia Women 3, New Zealand Women 0

=== 6th ODI ===
6 March 2002
Scorecard

New Zealand; 252/9 (50 overs)	v	Australia; 253/4 (50 overs)
Rebecca Rolls 114 (120); Cathryn Fitzpatrick 4/40 (9 overs)		Karen Rolton 105* (102); Aimee Watkins 1/31 (10 overs)

Australia Women won by 6 wickets
Bert Sutcliffe Oval, Lincoln
Umpires: Gary Baxter (NZ) and Robert Anderson (NZ)

- New Zealand Women won the toss and elected to bat.
- Points: Australia Women 3, New Zealand Women 0
