= India women's cricket team in Australia in 2021–22 =

International cricket tour

	Australia women	India women
- Dates: 21 September – 10 October 2021
Captains	Meg Lanning	Mithali Raj (WTest and WODIs); Harmanpreet Kaur (WT20Is)

Test series
- Result: 1-match series drawn 0–0
Most runs	Ellyse Perry (69)	Smriti Mandhana (158)
Most wickets	Sophie Molineux (3)	Pooja Vastrakar (4)

One Day International series
- Results: Australia women won the 3-match series 2–1
Most runs	Beth Mooney (177)	Smriti Mandhana (124)
Most wickets	Darcie Brown (5); Sophie Molineux (5)	Jhulan Goswami (4); Pooja Vastrakar (4)

Twenty20 International series
- Results: Australia women won the 3-match series 2–0
Most runs	Beth Mooney (95)	Jemimah Rodrigues (79)
Most wickets	Ashleigh Gardner (4)	Rajeshwari Gayakwad (5)
- Player of the series: Tahlia McGrath (Aus)

Series points
- Australia women 11, India women 5

The India women's cricket team played against Australia women's cricket team in September and October 2021, ahead of the 2022 Women's Cricket World Cup. The tour consisted of three Women's One Day International (WODI) matches in September, a day/night Test match at the Carrara Stadium in Queensland between 30 September and 3 October, and three Women's Twenty20 Internationals in October. It was the first day/night Test match to be played by the Indian women's team. The last time the India women's cricket team played a Test match in Australia was during their tour in February and March 2006.

Originally, the tour was scheduled to take place in January 2021. However, in December 2020, the tour was put into doubt when the Board of Control for Cricket in India (BCCI) did not want to commit to the schedule. On 31 December 2020, Cricket Australia (CA) confirmed that the tour had been postponed by one year. On 20 May 2021, Cricket Australia announced the fixtures for the series. A points-based system was used across all three formats of the tour, with four points for winning the Test match, two points if the Test is drawn, and two points for each win in the limited overs matches.

In August 2021, due to the COVID-19 pandemic in Australia, the tour schedule was moved back by two days, with all of the matches moved to Mackay and the Gold Coast in Queensland. In September 2021, Cricket Australia announced that Claire Polosak and Phillip Gillespie would be the on-field umpires for the one-off Test match.

Australia won the opening WODI match by nine wickets to record their 25th consecutive win in the format. The second match went down to the final ball, with Australia winning by five wickets to win the series. The third match also went to the last over, with India winning by two wickets with three balls to spare, breaking Australia's 26 game winning streak in WODIs, with Australia winning the series 2–1. In the one-off Test, more than 100 overs were lost across the first two days due to rain, with the match ending in a draw late on the fourth day. The first WT20I match was washed out after 15.2 overs of India's innings, with both teams sharing the points. Australia won the second WT20I by four wickets, to take an unassailable 9–5 lead on points across the series. Australia won the third and final WT20I match by 14 runs, winning the WT20I series 2–0, and winning the points-based series 11–5.

== Squads ==
Australia	India		
WTest, WODIs and WT20Is	WTest	WODIs	WT20Is
Meg Lanning (c); Rachael Haynes (vc); Darcie Brown; Maitlan Brown; Stella Campbell; Nicola Carey; Hannah Darlington; Ashleigh Gardner; Alyssa Healy (wk); Tahlia McGrath; Sophie Molineux; Beth Mooney; Ellyse Perry; Georgia Redmayne; Molly Strano; Annabel Sutherland; Tayla Vlaeminck; Georgia Wareham	Mithali Raj (c); Harmanpreet Kaur (vc); Taniya Bhatia (wk); Yastika Bhatia; Ekta Bisht; Rajeshwari Gayakwad; Richa Ghosh; Jhulan Goswami; Smriti Mandhana; Shikha Pandey; Sneh Rana; Punam Raut; Jemimah Rodrigues; Deepti Sharma; Meghna Singh; Pooja Vastrakar; Shafali Verma; Poonam Yadav	Mithali Raj (c); Harmanpreet Kaur (vc); Taniya Bhatia (wk); Yastika Bhatia; Ekta Bisht; Rajeshwari Gayakwad; Richa Ghosh; Jhulan Goswami; Smriti Mandhana; Shikha Pandey; Sneh Rana; Punam Raut; Jemimah Rodrigues; Deepti Sharma; Meghna Singh; Pooja Vastrakar; Shafali Verma; Poonam Yadav	Harmanpreet Kaur (c); Smriti Mandhana (vc); Yastika Bhatia; Harleen Deol; Rajeshwari Gayakwad; Richa Ghosh (wk); Shikha Pandey; Sneh Rana; Arundhati Reddy; Jemimah Rodrigues; Deepti Sharma; Meghna Singh; Renuka Singh; Pooja Vastrakar; Shafali Verma; Poonam Yadav; Radha Yadav

Australia did not name individual squads for the WTest, WODI and WT20I matches, opting instead to name a combined squad of 18 players for the tour. Australia's Tayla Vlaeminck was ruled out of the one-off Test and the WODI matches due to injury. India's Harmanpreet Kaur was ruled out of the first WODI match due to an injured thumb. Following the completion of the WODI matches, Australia's vice-captain Rachael Haynes was ruled out of the rest of the series due to a hamstring injury.

== Tour match ==
Ahead of the WODI matches, the teams played a warm-up match at the Ian Healy Oval in Brisbane, with Australia Women winning by 36 runs.

18 September 2021
Scorecard

Australia; 7/278 (50 overs)	v	India; 7/242 (50 overs)
Rachael Haynes 65 (71); Poonam Yadav 3/28 (6 overs)		Pooja Vastrakar 57 (84); Stella Campbell 3/38 (7 overs)

Australia Women won by 36 runs
Ian Healy Oval, Brisbane

== WODI series ==
=== 1st WODI ===
21 September 2021
10:05
Scorecard

India; 8/225 (50 overs)	v	Australia; 1/227 (41 overs)
Mithali Raj 63 (107); Darcie Brown 4/33 (9 overs)		Rachael Haynes 93* (100); Poonam Yadav 1/58 (10 overs)

Australia Women won by 9 wickets
Great Barrier Reef Arena, Mackay
Umpires: Phillip Gillespie (Aus) and Claire Polosak (Aus)
Player of the match: Darcie Brown (Aus)

- Australia Women won the toss and elected to field.
- Hannah Darlington (Aus), Yastika Bhatia, Richa Ghosh and Meghna Singh (Ind) all made their WODI debuts.
- Alyssa Healy (Aus) scored her 2,000th run in WODIs.
- Rachael Haynes (Aus) scored her 2,000th run in WODIs.
- Points: Australia Women 2, India Women 0.

=== 2nd WODI ===
24 September 2021
15:10 (D/N)
Scorecard

India; 7/274 (50 overs)	v	Australia; 5/275 (50 overs)
Smriti Mandhana 86 (94); Tahlia McGrath 3/45 (9 overs)		Beth Mooney 125* (133); Meghna Singh 1/38 (9 overs)

Australia Women won by 5 wickets
Great Barrier Reef Arena, Mackay
Umpires: Bruce Oxenford (Aus) and Eloise Sheridan (Aus)
Player of the match: Beth Mooney (Aus)

- Australia Women won the toss and elected to field.
- Points: Australia Women 2, India Women 0.

=== 3rd WODI ===
26 September 2021
10:05
Scorecard

Australia; 9/264 (50 overs)	v	India; 8/266 (49.3 overs)
Ashleigh Gardner 67 (62); Jhulan Goswami 3/37 (10 overs)		Yastika Bhatia 64 (69); Annabel Sutherland 3/30 (7 overs)

India Women won by 2 wickets
Great Barrier Reef Arena, Mackay
Umpires: Phillip Gillespie (Aus) and Bruce Oxenford (Aus)
Player of the match: Jhulan Goswami (Ind)

- Australia Women won the toss and elected to bat.
- Stella Campbell (Aus) made her WODI debut.
- Points: India Women 2, Australia Women 0.

== Only WTest ==
30 September – 3 October 2021 (D/N)
Scorecard

India	v	Australia
8/377d (145 overs); Smriti Mandhana 127 (216); Sophie Molineux 2/45 (23 overs)		9/241d (96.4 overs); Ellyse Perry 68* (203); Pooja Vastrakar 3/49 (21.4 overs)
3/135d (37 overs); Shafali Verma 52 (91); Georgia Wareham 1/12 (3 overs)		2/36 (15 overs); Meg Lanning 17* (43); Jhulan Goswami 1/8 (6 overs)

Match drawn
Carrara Stadium, Gold Coast
Umpires: Phillip Gillespie (Aus) and Claire Polosak (Aus)
Player of the match: Smriti Mandhana (Ind)

- Australia Women won the toss and elected to field.
- Only 44.1 overs and 57.4 overs of play were possible on days 1 and 2 respectively due to rain.
- Darcie Brown, Stella Campbell, Annabel Sutherland, Georgia Wareham (Aus), Yastika Bhatia and Meghna Singh (Ind) all made their Test debuts.
- Smriti Mandhana (Ind) scored her first century in Tests.
- Ellyse Perry (Aus) became the first woman to score 5,000 runs and take 300 wickets in international cricket.
- Points: Australia Women 2, India Women 2.

== WT20I series ==
=== 1st WT20I ===
7 October 2021
18:40 (N)
Scorecard

India; 4/131 (15.2 overs)	v	Australia
Jemimah Rodrigues 49* (36); Ashleigh Gardner 2/28 (3 overs)

No result
Carrara Stadium, Gold Coast
Umpires: Bruce Oxenford (Aus) and Eloise Sheridan (Aus)

- Australia Women won the toss and elected to field.
- Rain during India's innings prevented any further play.
- Hannah Darlington, Tahlia McGrath (Aus), Yastika Bhatia and Renuka Singh (Ind) all made their WT20I debuts.
- Jemimah Rodrigues (Ind) scored her 1,000th run in WT20Is.
- Points: Australia Women 1, India Women 1.

=== 2nd WT20I ===
9 October 2021
18:10 (N)
Scorecard

India; 9/118 (20 overs)	v	Australia; 6/119 (19.1 overs)
Pooja Vastrakar 37* (26); Sophie Molineux 2/11 (4 overs)		Tahlia McGrath 42* (33); Rajeshwari Gayakwad 3/21 (4 overs)

Australia Women won by 4 wickets
Carrara Stadium, Gold Coast
Umpires: Phillip Gillespie (Aus) and Bruce Oxenford (Aus)
Player of the match: Tahlia McGrath (Aus)

- Australia Women won the toss and elected to field.
- Ellyse Perry became the most capped female player for Australia in international cricket, playing in her 252nd match.
- Points: Australia Women 2, India Women 0.

=== 3rd WT20I ===
10 October 2021
18:10 (N)
Scorecard

Australia; 5/149 (20 overs)	v	India; 6/135 (20 overs)
Beth Mooney 61 (43); Rajeshwari Gayakwad 2/37 (4 overs)		Smriti Mandhana 52 (49); Nicola Carey 2/42 (4 overs)

Australia Women won by 14 runs
Carrara Stadium, Gold Coast
Umpires: Claire Polosak (Aus) and Eloise Sheridan (Aus)
Player of the match: Tahlia McGrath (Aus)

- India Women won the toss and elected to field.
- Points: Australia Women 2, India Women 0.
