= Integrity Commission =

Integrity Commission may refer to:

- ACT Integrity Commission, Australian Capital Territory government agency established in 2019
- Esports Integrity Commission, non-profit members' association established in 2016
- Integrity Commission (Belize), government department
- Integrity Commission (Tasmania), government agency established in 2010
- Sport Integrity Commission, New Zealand Crown entity established in 2024

== See also ==
- Integrity Commissioner, Ontario position created in 1988
- Election Integrity Commission (disambiguation), United States
