= The Racecourse =

Sports ground in Durham, England

Racecourse Ground
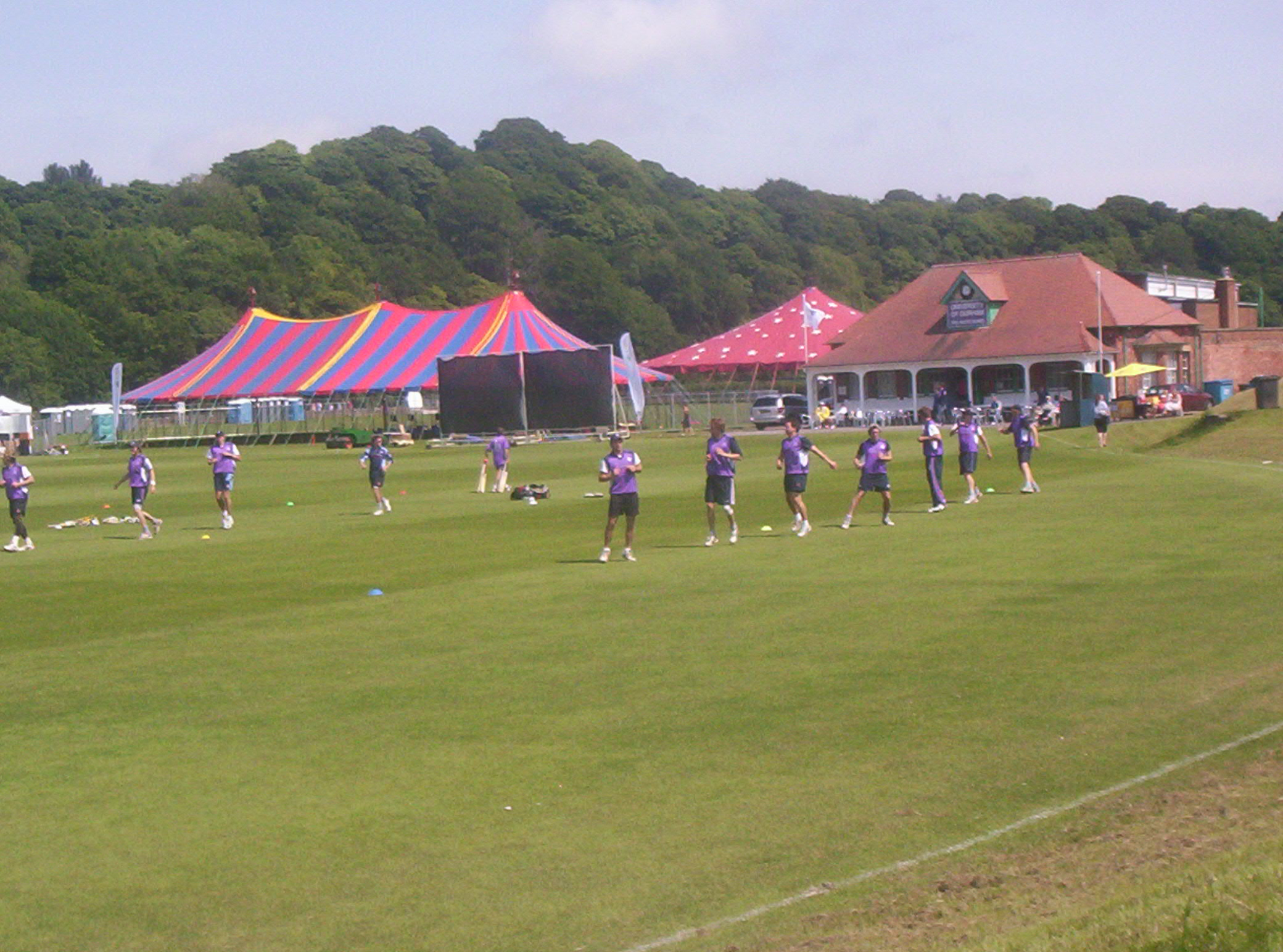
- Interactive map of Racecourse Ground

Ground information
- Location: Durham, County Durham
- Country: England
- Coordinates: 54°46′30″N 1°33′57″W
- Home club: Durham University
- County club: Durham
- Establishment: 1843 or earlier
- Capacity: 8500
- End names
- City End; Pavilion End

International information
- First women's ODI: 16 July 2002: England v New Zealand
- Last women's ODI: 17 July 2002: India v New Zealand

Team information
Durham CCC	(1992 – 1994)
Durham University	(1843 – present)
Durham City Cricket Club	(by 1844 – 1887)
- As of 6 September 2020; Source: CricketArchive

The Racecourse is an open area on the River Wear in Durham, England of 11.6 hectares (29 acres) total that has been used as a sports ground since at least 1733. It forms part of Durham University's sports facilities as well as hosting local sports clubs. The Racecourse cricket ground, which has hosted first class matches, has been used since at least 1843, and is the home ground of Durham University's cricket team. The Racecourse also contains squash, tennis and fives courts, rugby, hockey and football pitches, and boathouses.

As well as use by Durham University, the Racecourse is known for hosting two annual events, the Durham Regatta and Durham Miners' Gala. With the exception of the riverside path, which is owned by Durham County Council, the Racecourse is owned by Durham University.

== History ==
Before it was a racecourse, the Racecourse was known as Smelt Haugh or Smiddy Haughs and is thought to have been a smithy for the Prior of Durham. It was first recorded as being used for horse racing in 1733. At its peak, the course had a stone grandstand and attracted 80,000 spectators for a two-day event in 1873. Racing continued at the site until around 1887. From 1815 there was an annual boat procession along the River Wear at the Racecourse, celebrating Wellington's victory at the Battle of Waterloo. In 1834 this became the Durham Regatta, the second oldest regatta in England. The Durham Miners' Gala (established 1871) has been held annually at the Racecourse since 1872.

Cricket has been played on the Racecourse since at least 1843, when Durham University played the first recorded game there. This predates Cambridge's first game at Fenner's (1848) and Oxford's first game at The Parks (1881), making the Racecourse the oldest university cricket ground in England still in use. In the 1840s the land was owned by the Bishop of Chester, who leased it to Durham City Cricket Club (established in 1829) in 1844. By the late 1840s, however, the lease had passed to the university. There is a 19th century drawing of a "Grand cricket match at Durham" at University College, Durham, attributed to Cuthbert Bede and dated 1848; it was probably published in 1849 in the Illustrated London News. Durham City Cricket Club continued to play at The Racecourse cricket ground until 1887, when they moved "amid mutterings of discontent" to Green Lane Cricket Ground at the east end of the Racecourse. Horse racing was also stopped by the university at the same time, so from 1888 the ground was solely used by the university. The university cricket pavilion dates from 1898 and was extended in the 1960s. The original building, but not the extension, is noted as having "interesting architectural features".

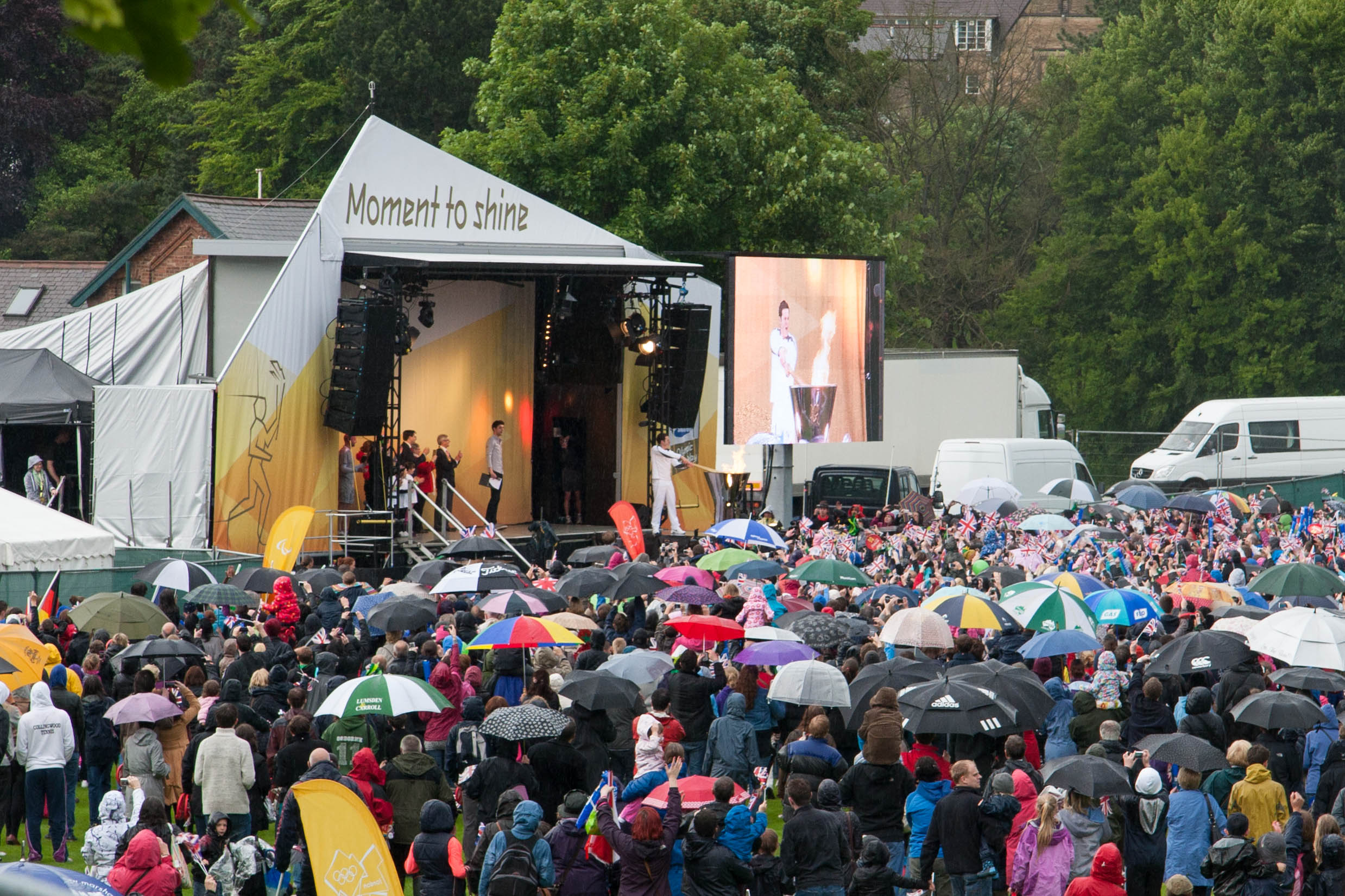
Matt Baker lights the cauldron at the Racecourse from the Olympic torch on day 29 of the relay, 16 June 2012.

On 16–17 June 2012 the Racecourse hosted the Olympic torch as part of the London 2012 Olympic torch relay.

The Racecourse was added to the County Durham local list in 2023.

== Cricket ground ==
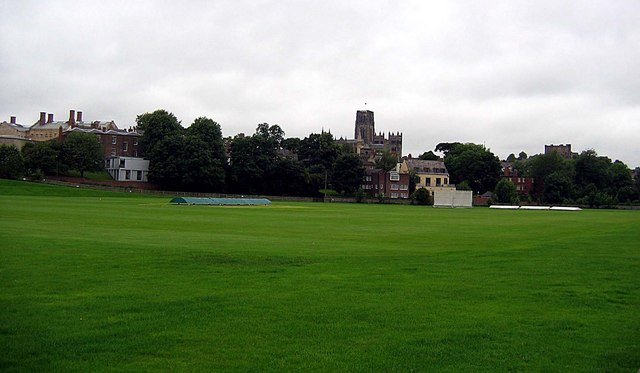
The Racecourse cricket ground

The Racecourse's most significant facility is its cricket ground, which has been used by Durham University since 1843. It has a capacity of 8,500 (2015).

The Racecourse cricket ground stands at the west end of the Racecourse. It hosted Durham County Cricket Club's first competitive match as a first-class county in 1992, against Leicestershire in the Sunday League, watched by a crowd of "somewhere close to 10,000". Between 1992 and 1994, Durham CCC played seven games there in the County Championship, seven List A games and a three-day game against Australia, which was notable for being Ian Botham's last match as a professional cricketer. Since Durham CCC moved into The Riverside Ground, which was completed in 1995, the ground has continued to host Durham University, Durham University Centre of Cricketing Excellence and Durham MCC University matches, which included 19 first-class matches against County sides as well as games in the MCC Universities Championship and BUCS Premier League. It was also used from 2000 - 2008 as the home for Durham CCC's Academy team, which played 50 North East Premier League matches on the ground. In 2007, it also hosted a three-day match between the touring West Indies team and the MCC. and a one-day match between the MCC and the touring Bangladesh A team in 2008.

It hosted two women's one-day internationals in 2002 (England vs New Zealand and India vs New Zealand) as part of the 2002 Women's Tri-Series, as well as England women's development squad vs India as part of India women's cricket team's 2002 tour, and a Durham Women one-day match against Lancashire Women in 2014, all retrospectively considered to have been List A matches.

The ground has hosted 28 first-class matches (excluding one abandoned without play) and 12 List A matches as of August 2022. It has also hosted four Second XI Championship matches as of August 2024: three for Durham County Second XI in 2006, 2007 and 2023 and one in 2011 with Marylebone Cricket Club Universities as the home team.

Game Information:

Game Type	No. of Games
County Championship matches	7
University matches (with first class status)	19
Tour matches	2
Total first class matches	28
Limited-over county matches	7
Limited-over tour matches	1
Women's one-day internationals	2
Women's limited-over county matches	1
Women's limited-over tour matches	1
Total List A matches	12

Game Statistics: first-class:

Category	Information
Highest Team Score	West Indies (534/8dec against MCC) in 2007
Lowest Team Score	Durham UCCE (46 against Nottinghamshire) in 2006
Best Batting Performance	Runako Morton (201 Runs for West Indies against MCC in 2007
Best Bowling Performance	Simon Brown (7/70 for Durham against Australia) in 1992

Game Statistics: one-day matches:

Category	Information
Highest Team Score	Surrey (330/6 in 39 overs against Durham) in 1992
Lowest Team Score	Derbyshire (169 in 44 overs against Durham) in 1993
Best Batting Performance	Darren Bicknell (125 Runs for Surrey against Durham) in 1992
Best Bowling Performance	Neil Lenham (5/28 for Sussex against Durham) in 1993

== Other sports facilities ==
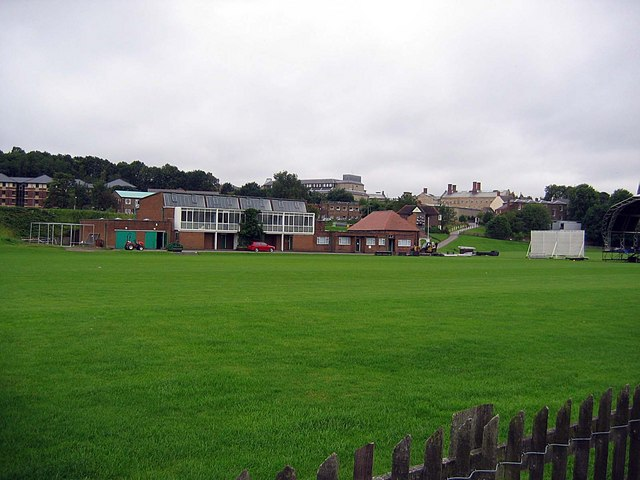
The Durham University pavilion at the Racecourse houses squash and fives courts

The Racecourse has around 20 acres (8 ha) of university sports fields. In addition to the cricket ground, these include grass pitches for rugby, football and hockey. The cricket pavilion also houses two fives courts and two squash courts. The Durham Amateur Rowing Club boathouse is located at the east (up stream) end of the Racecourse, while St Cuthbert's Society Boat Club is at the west (down stream) end.

In the eastern part of the Racecourse is Durham City's Green Lane Cricket Ground, which has been used for cricket since at least 1866 and was used by Durham County Cricket Club (then a minor county) in the Minor Counties Cricket Championship in 1899, 1904 and 1975 to 1984, and in the Minor Counties Trophy in 1988 and 1989. It hosted a single List A match for the county in 1979 and has hosted 16 List A matches for Durham Women. There is a bowling green adjacent to Green Lane cricket ground which is used by Durham City Bowling Club.

== Durham Miners' Gala ==
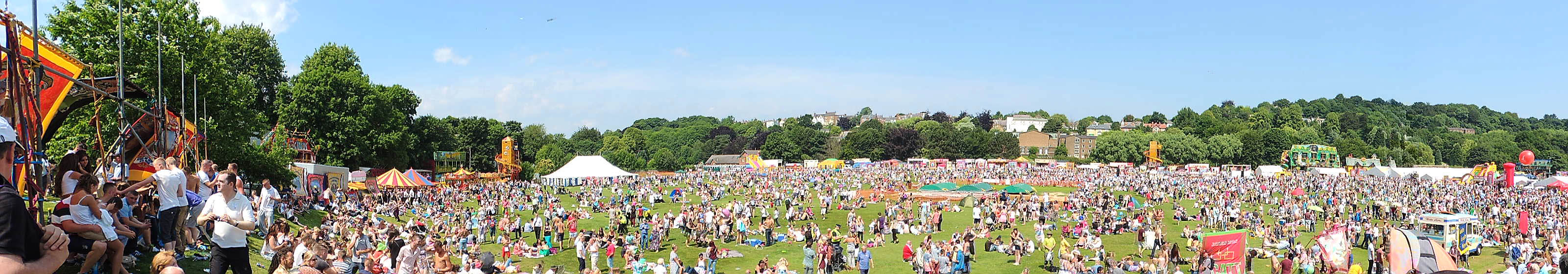
Panorama of the Durham Miners' Gala at the Racecourse in 2014

Durham Miners' Gala was first held at the Racecourse in 1872, which was the gala's second edition. All editions of the gala have since been held at the Racecourse. The event is typically held in mid-July, though has on occasions been held in August. The Racecourse is the location of the speeches held at the culmination of the Gala march. At its peak, 250,000 people attended the Gala.

== Durham Regatta ==
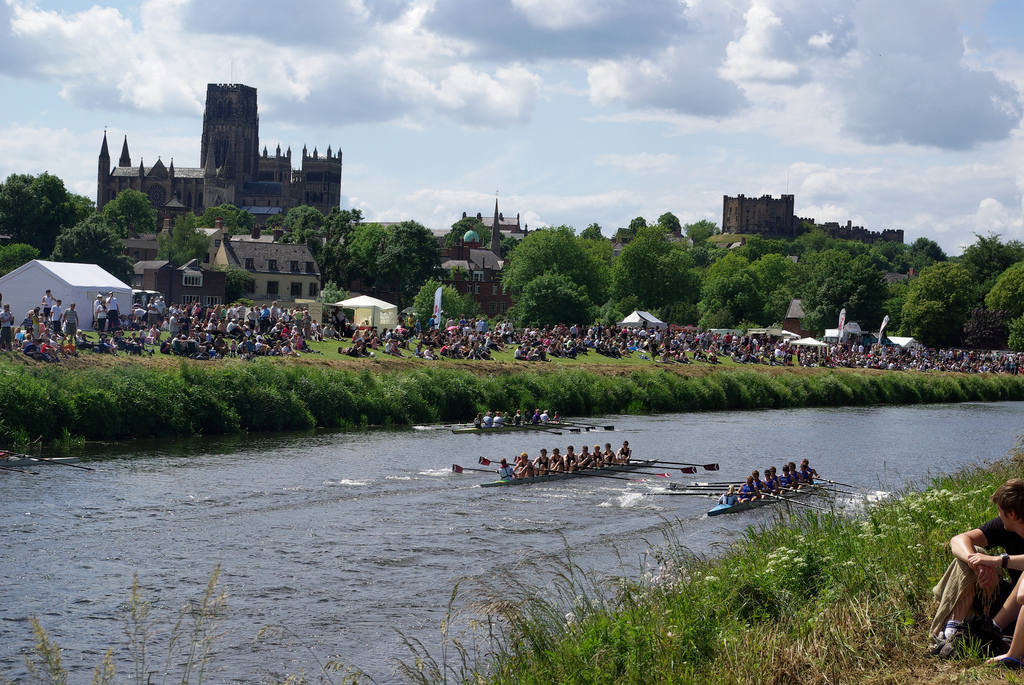
Boats racing on the Wear past the Racecourse at Durham Regatta

Durham Regatta has been held annually at the Racecourse since 1834 and is the second oldest regatta in England. The 700 m (2,300 ft) short (regatta) course starts at the east end of the Racecourse and ends at the west end, while the 1,800 m (5,900 ft) long (championship) course continues around the city and through Elvet Bridge to finish just before Prebends Bridge.

== See also ==
- Maiden Castle sports centre – Durham University's other major sports complex
- Riverside Ground – Durham County Cricket Club's current home
