= Trailblazers (Women's T20 Challenge) =

Former women's cricket club in India

Personnel
- Captain: Smriti Mandhana
- Coach: Sunetra Paranjpe

Team information
- Colours: Pink
- Established: 2018; 8 years ago

History
- T20 Challenge wins: 1 (2020)
T20

Trailblazers was an Indian cricket team. They were founded in 2018 to compete in the Women's T20 Challenge, which they competed in until the tournament ended in 2022. They won the tournament once, beating Supernovas in the final of the 2020 Women's T20 Challenge by 16 runs.

== History ==
=== 2018 ===
Trailblazers were formed in 2018 to take part in the inaugural Women's T20 Challenge competition, in which they played a one-off match against Supernovas. The game was viewed as a response to the men's Indian Premier League, and hopes were that the one-off game would lead towards a fully-fledged tournament in the future. Indian batter Smriti Mandhana was named as captain of the side, alongside fellow Indians Deepti Sharma and Jhulan Goswami as well as overseas players Alyssa Healy, Suzie Bates, Beth Mooney, Danielle Hazell and Lea Tahuhu.

In the match, which took place on 22 May 2018, the Trailblazers were put into bat and restricted to 129/6, with Suzie Bates top-scoring for 32. The game went to the final over, with Bates needing to defend four runs. Supernovas batter Ellyse Perry hit a single off the final ball to crown her side champions. The Supernovas were therefore crowned the winners of the inaugural Women's T20 Challenge.

=== 2019 ===
2019 saw the expansion of the tournament to three teams, with the addition of Velocity. Each side played each other once in a group stage, with the top two progressing to a final. Trailblazers won their first game of the tournament, a rematch against Supernovas, after captain Mandhana struck 90 off 67 balls, and tight bowling from Sophie Ecclestone and Rajeshwari Gayakwad restricted the Supernovas batters. In their second match, against Velocity, Trailblazers scored 112/6 batting first, which Velocity chased down with two overs to spare. The group ended with all sides on two points, but the Trailblazers had the worst Net Run Rate and were therefore eliminated.

=== 2020 ===
The 2020 Women's T20 Challenge was delayed due to the COVID-19 pandemic, eventually getting underway in November. Trailblazers played Velocity in their first game, bowling them out for just 47, with overseas bowler Sophie Ecclestone taking 4 wickets for 9 runs. Trailblazers then chased their target down in 7.5 overs. Their second game was much closer, however, as Supernovas set them 146 to chase. Deepti Sharma scored 43*, but Trailblazers fell two runs short.

Trailblazers still qualified for the final on Net Run Rate, however, and faced Supernovas again. Batting first, Mandhana scored 68 as her side reached 118, and tight bowling from Goswami, Sharma and Salma Khatun in particular meant Supernovas could only score 102, giving the Trailblazers their maiden T20 Challenge title.

=== 2022 ===
In 2022, Trailblazers lost their first game of the tournament, against Supernovas, by 49 runs. In their second match, against Velocity, Trailblazers scored 190/5 batting first, with Sabbhineni Meghana and Jemimah Rodrigues scoring half-centuries. Velocity were restricted to 174/9 in reply, but the group ended with all sides on two points, with the Trailblazers on the worst Net Run Rate, therefore being eliminated from the tournament.

The 2022 season proved to be the final edition of the Women's T20 Challenge, with the tournament being replaced by the Women's Premier League from the 2023 season.

== Players ==
Final squad, 2022 season.

- No. denotes the player's squad number, as worn on the back of their shirt.
- ‡ denotes players with international caps.

No.	Name	Nationality	Birth date	Batting style	Bowling style	Notes
Batters
18	Smriti Mandhana ‡	India	18 July 1996 (age 29)	Left-handed	Right-arm medium	Club captain
–	Sharmin Akhter ‡	Bangladesh	31 December 1996 (age 29)	Right-handed	–	Overseas player
–	Sabbhineni Meghana ‡	India	7 June 1996 (age 29)	Right-handed	Right-arm medium	
–	Jemimah Rodrigues ‡	India	5 September 2000 (age 25)	Right-handed	Right-arm off break	
All-rounders
3	Salma Khatun ‡	Bangladesh	1 October 1990 (age 35)	Right-handed	Right-arm off break	Overseas player
47	Sophia Dunkley ‡	England	16 July 1998 (age 27)	Right-handed	Right-arm leg break	Overseas player
–	Hayley Matthews ‡	West Indies	19 March 1998 (age 27)	Right-handed	Right-arm off break	Overseas player
Wicket-keepers
13	Richa Ghosh ‡	India	28 November 2003 (age 22)	Right-handed	Right-arm medium	
Bowlers
1	Rajeshwari Gayakwad ‡	India	1 June 1991 (age 34)	Right-handed	Slow left-arm orthodox	
–	Saiqa Ishaque	India	8 October 1995 (age 30)	Left-handed	Slow left-arm orthodox	
–	Sujata Mallik	India	4 June 1993 (age 32)	Right-handed	Right-arm medium	
–	Shradda Pokharkar	India	Unknown	Unknown	Unknown	
–	Priyanka Priyadarshini	India	3 May 1992 (age 33)	Right-handed	Right-arm off break	
20	Arundhati Reddy ‡	India	10 April 1997 (age 28)	Right-handed	Right-arm medium	
–	Renuka Singh ‡	India	2 January 1996 (age 29)	Right-handed	Right-arm medium	
–	Poonam Yadav ‡	India	24 August 1991 (age 34)	Right-handed	Right-arm leg break	

=== Overseas players ===
- (New Zealand) Suzie Bates (2018–2019)
- (England) Danielle Hazell (2018)
- (Australia) Alyssa Healy (2018)
- (Australia) Beth Mooney (2018)
- (New Zealand) Lea Tahuhu (2018)
- (England) Sophie Ecclestone (2019–2020)
- (Cricket West Indies) Shakera Selman (2019)
- (Cricket West Indies) Stafanie Taylor (2019)
- (Thailand) Natthakan Chantam (2020)
- (Cricket West Indies) Deandra Dottin (2020)
- (Bangladesh) Salma Khatun (2020–2022)
- (Bangladesh) Sharmin Akhter (2022)
- (England) Sophia Dunkley (2022)
- (Cricket West Indies) Hayley Matthews (2022)

== Seasons ==
=== Women's T20 Challenge ===
Season	Final standing	League standings								Notes
Season	Final standing	P	W	L	T	NR	Pts	NRR	Pos	Notes
2018	Runners-up	No Group stage								Lost to IPL Supernovas in the final
2019	Group stage	2	1	1	0	0	2	−0.305	3rd	
2020	Champions	2	1	1	0	0	2	+2.109	1st	Won against IPL Supernovas in the final
2022	Group stage	2	1	1	0	0	2	−0.825	3rd	

== Statistics ==
=== Women's T20 Challenge ===
Women's T20 Challenge - summary of results
Year	Played	Wins	Losses	Tied	NR	Win %
2018	1	0	1	0	0	0.00
2019	2	1	1	0	0	50.00
2020	3	2	1	0	0	66.66
2022	2	1	1	0	0	50.00
Total	8	4	4	0	0	50.00

Women's T20 Challenge - teamwise result summary
Opposition	Mat	Won	Lost	Tied	NR	Win %
IPL Supernovas	5	2	3	0	0	40.00
IPL Velocity	3	2	1	0	0	66.66
