= Green Lane Cricket Ground =

Cricket ground in England

Green Lane
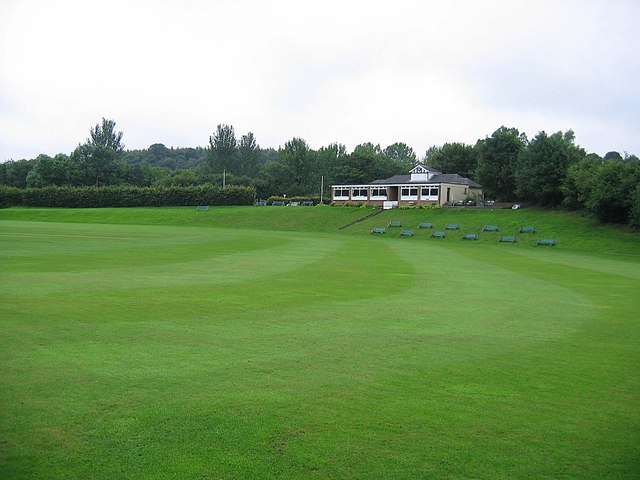

Ground information
- Location: Durham, County Durham
- Coordinates: 54°46′27″N 1°33′38″W
- Home club: Durham City
- County club: Durham/Durham Women
- Establishment: 1866 (first recorded match)

Team information
Durham City Cricket Club	(1888–present)
Durham	(Occasionally over 1891–1989)
Durham Women	(2014–2017)
- As of 19 August 2022; Source: Ground profile

Green Lane is a cricket ground in Durham, County Durham. The first recorded match on the ground was in 1866, when Durham City played the Northumberland Club. It became Durham City's main ground after they were forced to leave The Racecourse in 1888.

Durham first played at the ground in 1892 against Lincolnshire) and returned in 1893 to play Warwickshire. Their first match on the ground in the Minor Counties Championship came in 1899 against Norfolk, followed by Northamptonshire in 1904. Durham continued to use the ground for non-championship matches against the Durham Colts in 1901, 1902, 1907, 1910, 1911 and 1919, against Durham University in 1934, 1943 and 1946, a non-championship match against Cheshire in 1968, and against British Police in 1978. The ground was not used again for Minor Counties cricket until 1975, after which Durham played a championship match there every year until 1982 (two in 1980 and 1981), before playing their final Minor Counties Championship match there in 1984 against Bedfordshire. In 1988, Durham returned to the ground to play an MCCA Knockout Trophy match against Northumberland. The following season Durham played their final match on the ground in the MCCA Knockout Trophy against Cumberland.

The ground held a single List-A match in the 1979 Gillette Cup, which saw Durham play Berkshire, and has more recently hosted 16 List-A matches for Durham Women over 2014–2017. It also hosted 13 Twenty20 matches for Durham Women over 2015-2017 Following Durham's elevation to first-class cricket, the Durham Second XI have played a number of matches at the ground.
