= Riccarton High School =

- Māori: Te Kura Tuarua o Pūtaringamotu

Location
- 31 Vicki Street, Sockburn, Christchurch, New Zealand; 43°32′10″S 172°33′53″E

Information
- Type: State co-educational secondary (Year 9–13)
- Motto: Disce ut Prosis; Learn that you may be of service
- Established: 1958
- Ministry of Education Institution no.: 334
- Chairperson: Janine Ogier
- Principal: Haidee Tiffen (from term 4, 2026)
- Enrolment: 1,103 (July 2026)
- Socio-economic decile: 6N
- Website: riccarton.school.nz

Riccarton High School (Māori: Te Kura Tuarua o Pūtaringamotu) is a state co-educational secondary school located in Upper Riccarton, a suburb of Christchurch, New Zealand. With a roll of 1,103 students, it is one of the five largest secondary schools in Christchurch.

== History ==
The Government purchased the 25-acre (10 ha) site for the school in September 1954. The site had previously been proposed for a textile mill, but was sold after the owner abandoned its proposal.

In January 1956, the Christchurch Post-primary Schools' Council agreed to establish a high school in western Christchurch. The council originally decided to develop Burnside High School first; the Riccarton site was disfavoured due to proximity to an industrial area, the Wigram Aerodrome and main arterial roads. A deputation of eight primary schools, Wharenui, Ilam, Riccarton, Sockburn, Hornby, Yaldhurst, Templeton and West Melton, urged the council to reconsider its decision and develop the Riccarton site first. On 1 May 1956, the council agreed to develop Riccarton High School ahead of Burnside High School.

The school opened on 4 February 1958 with an initial roll of 140 third-form (now Year 9) students, Other years were added as the 1958 third-form cohort moved through, with the school opening to all year levels in 1962. The school's roll increased over time, reaching its height in 1974 when it had some 1,149 pupils on its books. With the opening of Hornby High School in 1976, Riccarton's roll began to drop. The lowest roll since 1974 was in 1986 when the school had dropped to just 612 pupils. Since then, the school has increased its numbers, stabilising at about 950 pupils a year.

== Enrolment ==
As of July 2026, Riccarton High School has roll of 1,103 students, of which 110 (10.0%) identify as Māori.

As of 2026, the school has an Equity Index of 440, placing it amongst schools whose students have below average socioeconomic barriers to achievement (roughly equivalent to decile 7 under the former socio-economic decile system).

== Academics ==
As a state school, Riccarton High School follows the New Zealand Curriculum (NZC). In Years 11 to 13, students complete the National Certificate of Educational Achievement (NCEA), the main secondary school qualification in New Zealand.

== Sport, music and culture ==
Riccarton High School has two sister schools in Japan. They are Takefu Higashi High School senior school in the Fukui Prefecture and Sakai Machi in Gunma Prefecture.

== Facilities ==
Riccarton High School was primarily constructed in the late-1950s "Nelson Single Storey" design, characterised by single-storey classroom blocks with six classrooms arranged in an H shape and toilet and cloakrooms on one side. Riccarton had three of these blocks, but only two remain: T block and S block. The school also has two 1960s "Nelson 2H" blocks, E/F and G/H, which are two-storey versions of the Nelson Single Storey blocks. E/F block was demolished and replaced with a marae.

In 2004 the school entered into a "partnership" with the Christchurch City Council to build a large school/community joint-use library and cafe at the school.

== Principals ==
Since its foundation in 1958, Riccarton High School has had seven principals. The following is a complete list:

	Name	Term
1	Allan Gainsford	1958–1967
2	Terry Hitchings	1968–1987
3	Barry Maister	1987–1994
4	Gary Coburn	1995–2005
5	Phil Holstein	2006–2014
6	Neil Haywood	2015–2026
7	Haidee Tiffen	2026–
