= Laura Morgan =

Irish cricketer (born 1978)

Personal information
- Full name: Laura Maureen Morgan
- Born: 18 December 1978 (age 47); Ireland
- Batting: Right-handed
- Bowling: Right-arm medium
- Role: Batter

International information
- National side: Ireland (2002)
- Only ODI (cap 46): 26 July 2002 v India

Career statistics
Competition	WODI
Matches	1
Runs scored	0
Batting average	0.00
100s/50s	0/0
Top score	0
Catches/stumpings	0/–
- Source: CricketArchive, 5 May 2022

Laura Maureen Morgan (born 18 December 1978) is an Irish former cricketer who played as a right-handed batter and right-arm medium bowler. She won One Day International for Ireland in 2002, against India.
