= Isa Guha =

English cricketer

Isa Guha MBE
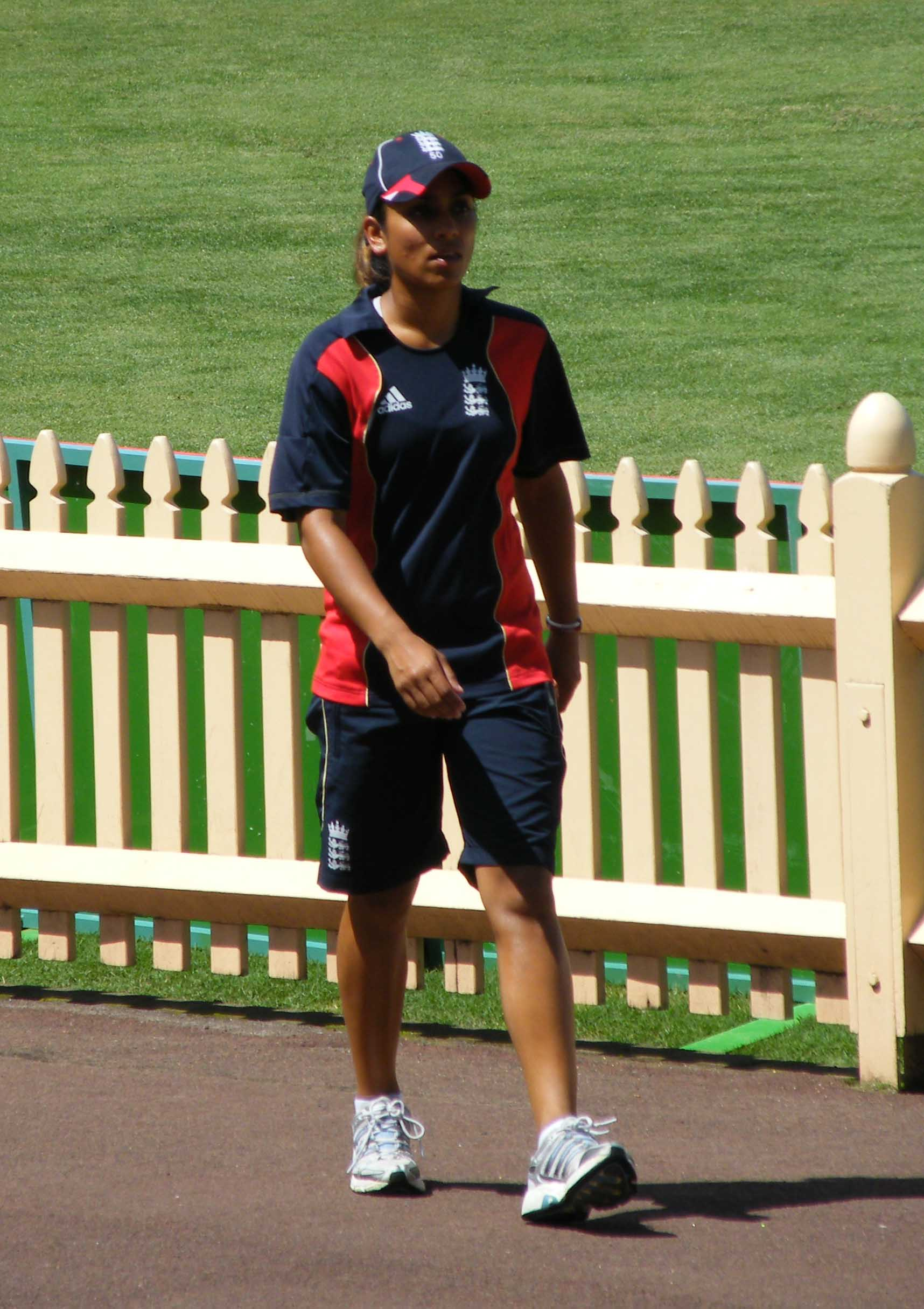
- Guha in 2009

Personal information
- Full name: Isa Tara Guha
- Born: 21 May 1985 (age 41); High Wycombe, Buckinghamshire, England
- Batting: Right-handed
- Bowling: Right-arm medium
- Role: Bowler

International information
- National side: England (2001–2011)
- Test debut (cap 137): 14 August 2002 v India
- Last Test: 22 January 2011 v Australia
- ODI debut (cap 94): 10 August 2001 v Scotland
- Last ODI: 21 October 2011 v South Africa
- ODI shirt no.: 19
- T20I debut (cap 5): 5 August 2004 v New Zealand
- Last T20I: 29 October 2011 v South Africa

Domestic team information
- Years: Team
- 1998–1999: Thames Valley
- 2000–2014: Berkshire

Career statistics
Competition	WTest	WODI	WT20I	WLA
Matches	8	83	22	205
Runs scored	113	122	39	1,556
Batting average	16.14	8.71	7.80	14.67
100s/50s	0/0	0/0	0/0	0/5
Top score	31*	26	13*	72*
Balls bowled	1,491	3,767	459	9,550
Wickets	29	101	18	249
Bowling average	18.93	23.21	25.05	22.43
5 wickets in innings	1	2	0	2
10 wickets in match	0	0	0	0
Best bowling	5/40	5/14	3/21	5/14
Catches/stumpings	3/–	26/–	4/–	71/–
- Source: CricketArchive, 7 March 2021

Isa Tara Guha MBE (born 21 May 1985) is an English former England cricketer and now a sports television commentator and radio broadcaster. She played in the 2005 South Africa World Cup and the 2009 Australia World Cup.

As a right-arm medium bowler and right-handed batter, Guha represented England in eight Test matches, 83 One Day Internationals and 22 Twenty20 Internationals between 2001 and 2011. She was appointed Member of the Most Excellent Order of the British Empire (MBE) in 2025 for services to Inclusivity and Cricket

== Early years and education ==
Guha was born at High Wycombe, Buckinghamshire, her parents (Barun Guha and Roma née Deb) having emigrated from Calcutta in West Bengal, India to the United Kingdom in the 1970s. Guha started playing cricket with her older brother when she was about eight and was selected for the Development England side aged 13.

Guha attended Wycombe High School, a grammar school for girls, before attending University College London where she read biochemistry and molecular biology (graduating BSc), then neuroscience (MPhil).

== Cricket career ==
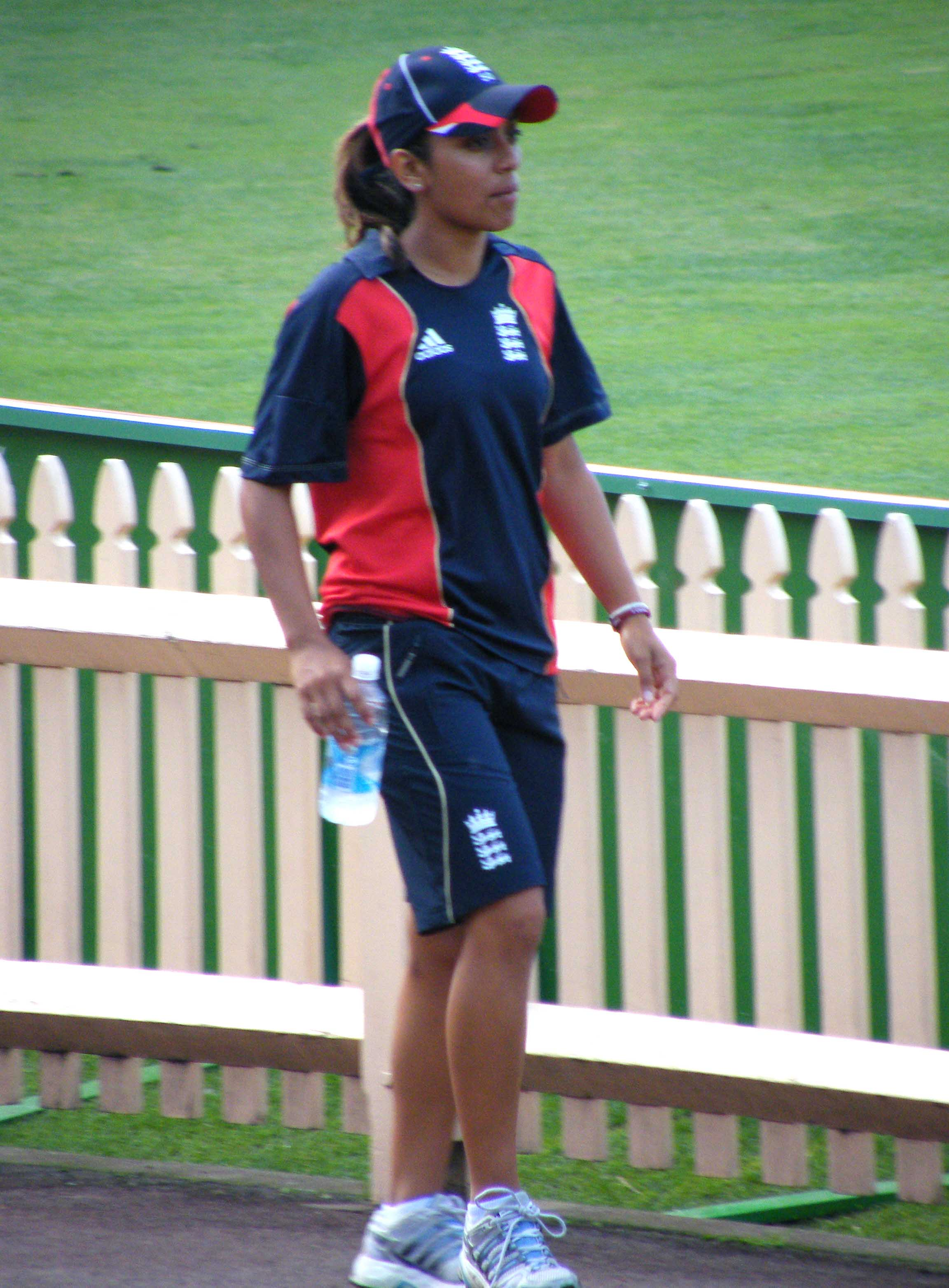
Guha at the 2009 ICC Women's Cricket World Cup in Australia

A right arm fast-medium bowler, Guha played minor counties cricket for Berkshire CCC and for Thames Valley CC.

Guha made her Test cricket debut at 17 against India during their tour of England in 2002. During that tour, Guha played in the 2002 Women's Tri-Series and performed well, taking three wickets in England's loss against New Zealand in the final. She became the first woman of Indian heritage to represent England at cricket and was subsequently named the 2002 BBC Asian Network Sports Personality of the Year.

Guha's career best Test bowling figures were 5 for 40 in her penultimate Test match against Australia at the Bradman Oval in February 2008, where she took 9 wickets in the match and received the Player of the Match Award as England retained The Ashes. Her best bowling in 83 ODIs was 5 for 14 against the West Indies later in 2008. In the same year, Guha rose to become the number one bowler in the ICC Women's One-Day International rankings.

Guha was an integral part of the England team which won the 2009 World Cup, later citing this as her playing career highlight.

Guha announced her retirement from international cricket on 9 March 2012, stating she would continue to play county cricket for Berkshire.

Guha with Lynsey Askew shared the world record batting partnership for the ninth wicket in WODIs of 73 runs from 2007 until 2024.

== Media work ==
Guha writes a column for the BBC Sport website and is a Test Match Special commentator. She joined ITV Sport in April 2012 as a co-presenter of ITV4's coverage of the Indian Premier League.

In 2016, Guha was a member of the inaugural Triple M radio Test cricket commentary team in Australia. In 2018, she was a commentator for Sky Sports for the England/Pakistan Test matches, and was named as a commentator for Fox Cricket for their Australian cricket coverage. She was also a member of the commentary team at the 2019 Cricket World Cup. In 2020 she was the lead presenter of a new BBC TV Test and ODI cricket highlights show.

For the Birmingham 2022 Commonwealth Games, Guha presented a nightly highlights show for the BBC alongside JJ Chalmers. In 2023, Guha joined the tennis presenting team for the BBC's coverage of the Wimbledon Championships. She presented a nightly highlights show with Mark Chapman for the BBC during the Paris Olympics in 2024.

== Charity interests and philanthropy ==
Isa Guha is an Ambassador (or "Supporter") for Sporting Equals and the British Asian Trust. In 2023, she launched the Got Your Back initiative in order to support female cricket players.

== Personal life ==
On 16 September 2018, Guha married her long-time boyfriend, British musician Richard Thomas, a member of the band Brother & Bones.

In 2024, Guha found herself in the middle of a controversy after referring to Indian player Jasprit Bumrah on commentary as the "most valuable primate". She later issued an apology to Bumrah.
