= Sport Integrity Commission =

Agency overview
- Formed: July 2024
- Preceding agency: Drug Free Sport New Zealand
- Jurisdiction: New Zealand
- Annual budget: $10.628 m NZD (2024/2025)
- Minister responsible: Sporting Minister
- Parent department: Sport New Zealand
- Website: https://sportintegrity.nz/

The Sport Integrity Commission (Te Kahu Raunui) is an independent New Zealand Crown entity which focuses on upholding the integrity of the sport and recreation system, protecting the wellbeing of its participants, and applying the World Anti-Doping Code. It is the successor to an earlier organisation called Drug Free Sport New Zealand (DFSNZ). Legislation establishing the Sport Integrity Commission was passed on 16 August 2023, with the organisation launching on 1 July 2024.

The Commission was established following a report released in April 2022 by the [Sport] Integrity Working Group (IWG). In the report the IWG recommended the creation of a new independent organisation that the existing DFSNZ would be folded into. Along with the introduction of a set of minimum standards in sport and recreation.

The Integrity Sport and Recreation Act 2023 set out the following responsibilities for the commission:

1. Engaging with participants to ensure safe and fair sport and recreation
2. Setting and administering standards and rules regarding both integrity and anti-doping
3. Providing the impartial resolution of complaints and disputes
4. Investigating and reporting on failures in integrity in sport and recreation e.g. regarding doping, match-fixing, corruption, and fraud

Drug Free Sport New Zealand produced annual reports, ceasing upon its disestablishment in 2024. Since then the Sport Integrity Commission has published several documents, notably including a statement of intent for the period 2024–2028. The Commission was budgeted $10.628 million NZD in Crown funding for its services 2024/2025.

== Formation ==
The formation of the Sport Integrity Commission was prompted by a sustained series of sporting integrity failures and consequential review processes through the 2010s, both national and international, that revealed institutional shortcomings in the handling of integrity concerns.

Drug Free Sport New Zealand was established as an independent Crown entity, under the New Zealand Sports and Drug Agency Act 1994 passed by New Zealand's Fourth National Government.

On 12 October 2018 the Heron Review, conducted by Michael Heron, confirmed reported instances of bullying, inappropriate relationships, and drinking within Cycling New Zealand’s (CNZ) high performance programme. The review placed responsibility for the incidents primarily on CNZ, but noted that High Performance Sport New Zealand (HPSNZ) placed too much trust in CNZ to resolve known issues. In the same year investigations into reports of misconduct were also undertaken in New Zealand’s national football and hockey programmes. These domestic troubles took place against a backdrop of a slew of international sporting integrity failures in the surrounding decade, with high profile cases of doping, financial impropriety, and sexual abuse.

On 6 December 2018 Stephen Cottrell published a review, Elite Athletes’ Rights and Welfare, commissioned by Sport New Zealand (Sport NZ). Cottrell confirmed evidence of a growing problem in New Zealand elite sport to do with a lack of focus on elite athletes rights and welfare. The review encouraged immediate action from the sports organisations to address the issue before it became a crisis. The report also suggested Sport NZ and HPSNZ take a leadership role in this process, amongst other recommendations.

On 31 October 2018 Sport NZ began public consultation for the Sport NZ Integrity Review, which was released in September 2019. The review looked to provide insight on how best to protect the integrity of sport and recreation in New Zealand. The review outlined 22 recommendations for how to accomplish this, which Sport NZ began to implement.

Integrity issues and corresponding reviews across multiple codes of New Zealand sport continued through 2020. In response to the concluded Sport Integrity Review the Integrity Working Group was formed to evaluate the most appropriate institutional arrangement to accommodate the 22 recommendations from the review.

On 9 August 2021 Olivia Podmore, NZ professional race cyclist and olympian, died of a suspected suicide. Believed to be connected to the fallout of the Heron Review and the misconduct it had reported on, there was a renewed focus on integrity issues in New Zealand's high performance sports programmes.

In April 2022 the Integrity Working Group published its concluding report. In which, amongst other recommendations, it called for the introduction of a National Code of Sport Integrity as well as the establishment of the Sport Integrity Commission; incorporating the existing the DFSNZ and integrity focused team within Sport NZ.

On 23 August 2023, the Integrity Sport and Recreation Act 2023 received Royal assent having received near unanimous support through the 53rd New Zealand Parliament. The Act established the commission as an independent Crown entity. As a Crown entity the commission is “set up at ‘arm’s length’ from ministers to deliver a range of government services and make some decisions independently.” Establishment of the commission was aided by the Integrity in Sport and Recreation Establishment Board, a ministerial advisory committee approved by Cabinet on 3 April 2023. The commission formally began operations on 1 July 2024.

== Organisational structure ==
=== Legislative foundation ===
The Sport Integrity Commission is established under the Integrity Sport and Recreation Act 2023. This Act provides the foundation for the commission's independent operating status, powers, and responsibilities. It delineates essential components—including provisions for establishing integrity and anti-doping codes and enforce related rules—that empower the commission to act decisively in upholding the integrity of sport and recreation.

=== Governance ===
==== Board of Commissioners ====
On 24 May 2024, Sporting Minister Chris Bishop announced the members of the Sport Integrity Commission Board. The Board is composed of the following individuals:

- Don Mackinnon (chairperson)
- Traci Houpapa
- Tim Castle
- Adine Wilson
- Keven Mealamu
- Bobbi-Jo Clark-Heu
- Dr Lesley Nicol
- Lyndon Bray
- Rebecca McDonald
- Representatives from Te Ope Tāmiro (Tikanga Māori, Mātauranga Māori)

The primary role of the Board is to uphold ethical practices and ensure transparency across both competitive sports and recreational activities. This involves establishing standards that protect individuals while promoting a fair and equitable environment. In addition, the Commission bears the critical responsibility of implementing and enforcing the World Anti-Doping Code across New Zealand, thereby reinforcing its commitment to maintaining a clean and trustworthy framework. Te Ope Tāmiro collaborates with the Board to align the commission's practices with Māori aspirations for sport integrity in New Zealand.

==== Chief executive and senior leadership team ====
The commission is managed by a distinguished Senior Leadership Team, led by Chief Executive Rebecca Rolls as of July 2024. This team is organised into specialist divisions that focus on key areas of sport integrity in New Zealand, ensuring that the commission's values, standards, and practices are consistently upheld across all its operations.

==== Specialised functions/divisions ====
Internally, the Commission is structured into distinct sections that correspond to its core functions:

- Anti-doping
- Anti-corruption
- Participant protection

== Core functions ==
=== Anti-doping ===
The Sport Integrity Commission is tasked with implementing, monitoring, and enforcing anti-doping regulations in both sport and recreation throughout New Zealand. Its responsibilities in this domain include the following:

==== Implementation of the World Anti-Doping Code ====
In accordance with the Integrity Sport and Recreation Act 2023, New Zealand is required to implement the World Anti-Doping Code. This Code serves as the foundational document for coordinating anti-doping policies, rules, and regulations among sport organisations and authorities worldwide. The World Anti-Doping Agency (WADA) works collaboratively with numerous countries to administer testing protocols, investigations, safeguard athlete rights, and impose sanctions, thereby ensuring fairness in both competitive and recreational contexts. The Commission draws on these internationally recognised principles to guide its processes and adapt to emerging challenges and regulatory updates.

==== Testing and investigations ====
Under the Act, the commission is responsible to conduct comprehensive anti-doping testing and investigations. It has the authority to examine suspected threats to integrity or breaches of established codes. Moreover, the commission is obligated to transport test sample results to a WADA-accredited laboratory for analysis and, when necessary, referring cases for additional disciplinary or legal procedures.

==== Education and outreach ====
In addition to its regulatory functions, the Commission plays a significant educational role. It provides a suite of resources—including guidelines, programmes, workshops, and webinars—designed to inform athletes, coaches, supporters, and administrators about their rights, responsibilities, and the expectations imposed by both national and international anti-doping standards.

=== Anti-corruption ===
The Commission actively endeavours to prevent, detect, and investigate corrupt practices across New Zealand. These measures target behaviours such as match-fixing, bribery, and other unethical practices that undermine fair competition.

According to its first annual report, the Sport Integrity Commission received 283 complaints between 1 July 2024 and 30 June 2025. Of these, 39 involved corruption, fraud, deception or breaches of trust, while 19 concerned governance issues. The report also stated that 67% of complaints related to community-level sport and recreation, with the remaining 33% concerning national-level or high-performance sport.

==== Establishment of integrity and anti-corruption codes ====
In February 2025, the Sport Integrity Commission introduced “The Integrity Code for Sport and Recreation”. The purpose of this Code is to protect the safety and wellbeing of athletes, coaches, supporters, and administrators alike. Under the ”Minimum Standards of Behaviour in Sport and Recreation” (Section 7), the Code explicitly prohibits corruption, fraud, deception, and breaches of trust. The Commission strictly adheres to these established standards and enforces disciplinary measures as required to curb corrupt practices.

=== Participant protection ===
Safeguarding everyone involved in sports—whether they are elite athletes, community participants, or young enthusiasts—is a fundamental responsibility of the commission.

==== Setting safety standards ====
The development of “The Integrity Code for Sport and Recreation” also includes the establishment of clear rules, regulations, and standards designed to protect all participants. These measures aim to create a secure, respectful, and non-discriminatory environment across all sporting contexts.

==== Combating harm and implementing safeguards ====
Participant protection involves proactive measures to shield individuals from exploitation, abuse, and any associated harm within the sport. The commission is tasked with establishing confidential complaint mechanisms that allow concerns to be raised and addressed promptly. These mechanisms ensure that sports and recreation organisations adhere to best practices for safeguarding participants and receive the necessary education on these critical issues.

The Sports Integrity Commission New Zealand (also known as Sport Integrity Commission Te Kahu Raunui) is structured with a governance framework comprising a Board, a Chief Executive, and dedicated operational divisions. Its multifaceted functions—spanning anti-doping, anti-corruption, and participant protection—are all grounded in both national legislation and internationally recognised standards such as the World Anti-Doping Code. This integrated approach ensures that the sporting landscape in New Zealand remains safe, fair, and transparent for all involved.

== Initiatives and public engagement ==
Since its establishment, the Sport Integrity Commission (Te Kahu Raunui) has introduced several initiatives aimed at promoting integrity within New Zealand's sporting landscape. These programs focus on anti-doping education, safeguarding participants, and fostering a culture of transparency and accountability.

=== Speak Out campaign ===
The "Speak Out" campaign is a flagship initiative designed to encourage individuals involved in sports to report doping-related or unethical behaviour in a safe and confidential manner. Recognising that even small pieces of information may be important, the campaign offers multiple avenues for making reports—via a confidential 0800 hotline, a secure email address, or an anonymous online form. These reports can concern past, present, or anticipated future misconduct involving athletes, coaches, medical staff, or other support personnel.

The campaign plays a vital role in fostering an environment where clean athletes are protected and potential breaches of conduct are addressed systematically. The commission has reiterated that all information, regardless of its perceived significance, is taken seriously and may contribute to larger investigations.

=== Global DRO – drug/medication Check ===
The Commission provides access to the Global Drug Reference Online (Global DRO), a tool that enables athletes and their support personnel to check the prohibited status of medications under the World Anti-Doping Agency (WADA) guidelines. By selecting New Zealand as the jurisdiction on the Global DRO website, users can verify the compliance status of both prescription and over-the-counter medications specific to the country.

The tool is widely used by athletes, team doctors, and pharmacists and forms a key component of the commission's outreach and education efforts. It is also integrated into athlete workshops and online learning modules distributed to national sporting bodies.

=== Integrity code development ===
In 2023, the Commission initiated the development of New Zealand's first national "Code of Integrity for Sport and Recreation." The goal of the code is to set consistent expectations and standards of behaviour across all levels of sport, including community and high-performance environments. A nationwide consultation process was held between June and August 2023, during which more than 2,000 responses were received.

Feedback from the consultation revealed that stakeholders wanted the code to be inclusive, accessible, and adaptable to the wide range of organisations and individuals participating in sport and recreation. Key themes included addressing bullying, harassment, discrimination, and safeguarding vulnerable groups. The final version of the Code was published in 2025.

=== Educational programs and digital resources ===
The commission also oversees a range of educational initiatives aimed at athletes, support staff, schools, and sporting bodies. These include e-learning modules, in-person training sessions, and downloadable toolkits that cover topics such as anti-doping awareness, ethical coaching practices, athlete wellbeing, and youth sport safety.

One notable effort is the anti-doping education program targeting youth and emerging athletes. The program uses interactive videos and real-life case studies to help athletes understand their rights and responsibilities under the WADA Code.

To improve accessibility, the commission has launched digital platforms that centralise integrity information, including anti-doping policies, complaint processes, and whistleblower protections. These platforms aim to ensure that resources are available to all stakeholders, regardless of geographic location or sporting level.

== Reception ==
The initiatives of the Sport Integrity Commission have generally been well received by the public and sporting community in New Zealand. Media coverage has highlighted the commission's proactive stance on addressing issues such as doping, misconduct, and athlete welfare. The development of the Integrity Code and the implementation of tools such as Global DRO have been presented as efforts to align with global standards and improve trust in national sporting systems.

Articles in national outlets such as Stuff and New Zealand Herald have covered these initiatives, often featuring commentary from athletes and administrators who have welcomed the commission's efforts to protect clean sport and support safe environments.

Stakeholders from national sporting organisations have praised the commission's clarity, guidance, and willingness to engage with community-level concerns. The transparent publication of consultation findings and updates on policy development has helped build trust with the public and reinforced the commission's credibility as a regulator and educator.
