= Inge Leurs =

Dutch cricketer (born 1975)

Personal information
- Born: 1 January 1975 (age 51); Venlo, Netherlands

International information
- National side: Netherlands
- ODI debut (cap 62): 26 June 2002 v New Zealand
- Last ODI: 19 August 2005 v Ireland

Career statistics
Competition	WODI
Matches	4
Runs scored	22
Batting average	5.50
100s/50s	0/0
Top score	22
Catches/stumpings	0/0
- Source: Cricinfo, 20 November 2017

Inge Leurs (born 1 January 1975) is a former Dutch woman cricketer. She made her international debut in the inaugural edition of the Women's Cricket World Cup Qualifier in 2003. Inge has played in 4 Women's ODIs representing Dutch cricket team.
