= Election Integrity Commission =

Election Integrity Commission may refer to:

- Election Assistance Commission, an independent agency of the United States government created by the Help America Vote Act of 2002
- Presidential Advisory Commission on Election Integrity, a presidential commission created by Donald Trump in 2017
