= Sunita Singh =

Indian cricketer (born 1974)

Personal information
- Full name: Sunita Singh
- Born: 22 February 1974 (age 52); Amritsar, India
- Batting: Right-handed
- Bowling: Right-arm medium
- Role: Bowler

International information
- National side: India (2000–2002)
- Test debut (cap 59): 19 March 2002 v South Africa
- Last Test: 14 August 2002 v England
- ODI debut (cap 58): 2 December 2000 v Netherlands
- Last ODI: 11 August 2002 v England

Domestic team information
- Years: Team
- 1994/95: Air India
- 1995/96–2001/02: Railways

Career statistics
Competition	WTest	WODI	WFC	WLA
Matches	2	18	10	55
Runs scored	6	24	41	70
Batting average	6.00	4.00	20.50	6.36
100s/50s	0/0	0/0	0/0	0/0
Top score	6*	12	24	14*
Balls bowled	318	790	820	1,913
Wickets	3	12	21	48
Bowling average	35.33	28.83	17.60	22.04
5 wickets in innings	0	0	2	0
10 wickets in match	0	0	1	0
Best bowling	1/13	2/8	5/30	3/20
Catches/stumpings	1/–	0/–	4/–	4/–
- Source: CricketArchive, 19 August 2022

Sunita Singh (Hindi: सुनीता सिंह; née Kanojia; born 22 February 1974) is an Indian former cricketer who played primarily as a right-arm medium bowler. She appeared in two Test matches and 18 One Day Internationals for India between 2000 and 2002. She played domestic cricket for Air India and Railways.
