= Marianne Herbert =

Irish cricketer (born 1981)

Personal information
- Full name: Marianne Theresa Herbert
- Born: 2 December 1981 (age 44); Malahide, Ireland
- Batting: Right-handed
- Bowling: Right-arm medium
- Role: Bowler

International information
- National side: Ireland (2002–2009)
- ODI debut (cap 45): 6 July 2002 v New Zealand
- Last ODI: 26 May 2009 v Pakistan
- T20I debut (cap 4): 27 June 2008 v West Indies
- Last T20I: 29 May 2009 v Pakistan

Domestic team information
- Years: Team
- 2015: Scorchers

Career statistics
Competition	WODI	WT20I	WLA	WT20
Matches	15	5	21	9
Runs scored	26	1	32	1
Batting average	3.71	–	3.55	–
100s/50s	0/0	0/0	0/0	0/0
Top score	9	1*	9	1*
Balls bowled	456	84	774	114
Wickets	7	4	14	5
Bowling average	53.14	24.25	37.85	24.40
5 wickets in innings	0	0	0	0
10 wickets in match	0	0	0	0
Best bowling	2/20	3/18	3/16	3/18
Catches/stumpings	2/–	0/–	3/–	0/–
- Source: CricketArchive, 2 June 2021

Marianne Theresa Herbert (born 2 December 1981) is an Irish former cricketer who played as a right-arm medium bowler. She appeared in 15 One Day Internationals and 5 Twenty20 Internationals for Ireland between 2002 and 2009, including being part of Ireland's squad for the 2005 Women's Cricket World Cup. She also played in the 2015 Women's Super 3s for Scorchers.
