= Deepa Marathe =

Indian cricketer (born 1972)

Personal information
- Full name: Deepa Madhukar Marathe
- Born: 25 November 1972 (age 53); Wai, Maharashtra, India
- Nickname: Deeps
- Batting: Right-handed
- Bowling: Slow left-arm orthodox
- Role: All-rounder

International information
- National side: India (1997–2005)
- Test debut (cap 50): 15 July 1999 v England
- Last Test: 27 November 2003 v New Zealand
- ODI debut (cap 52): 13 December 1997 v West Indies
- Last ODI: 10 April 2005 v Australia

Domestic team information
- Years: Team
- 1995/96–1998/99: Air India
- 1999/00–2004/05: Railways

Career statistics
Competition	WTest	WODI	WFC	WLA
Matches	5	59	20	91
Runs scored	67	96	219	387
Batting average	11.16	7.38	18.25	16.12
100s/50s	0/0	0/0	0/1	0/1
Top score	40	21*	69	50*
Balls bowled	1,002	2,683	1,977	3,742
Wickets	8	60	44	111
Bowling average	42.25	20.83	18.23	16.72
5 wickets in innings	0	0	3	1
10 wickets in match	0	0	0	0
Best bowling	3/14	4/1	7/20	6/8
Catches/stumpings	1/–	18/–	5/–	21/–
Medal record
Representing India
Women's cricket
World Cup
Runner-up	2005 South Africa
- Source: CricketArchive, 19 August 2022

Deepa Madhukar Marathe (née Kulkarni; born 25 November 1972) is an Indian former cricket all-rounder who played domestically for Air India, Railways and internationally for the India women's national team.

She played as a right-handed batter and slow left-arm orthodox bowler. She appeared in five Test matches and 59 One Day Internationals for India between 1997 and 2005.
