= Arundhati Kirkire =

Indian cricketer (born 1980)

Personal information
- Full name: Arundhati Kirkire
- Born: 31 May 1980 (age 46); Indore, India
- Batting: Right-handed
- Bowling: Right-arm medium
- Role: Batter; occasional wicket-keeper

International information
- National side: India (2000–2005)
- Only Test (cap 54): 14 January 2002 v England
- ODI debut (cap 59): 6 December 2000 v Australia
- Last ODI: 1 December 2005 v England

Domestic team information
- Years: Team
- 1999/00: Madhya Pradesh
- 2000/01–2004/05: Railways

Career statistics
Competition	WTest	WODI	WFC	WLA
Matches	1	30	6	49
Runs scored	3	304	191	658
Batting average	3.00	19.00	47.75	22.68
100s/50s	0/0	1/1	0/1	1/2
Top score	3	106	81	106
Balls bowled	–	128	–	194
Wickets	–	7	–	7
Bowling average	–	10.28	–	13.85
5 wickets in innings	–	0	–	0
10 wickets in match	–	0	–	0
Best bowling	–	3/13	–	3/13
Catches/stumpings	0/–	9/4	1/–	23/19
- Source: CricketArchive, 3 June 2022

Arundhati Kirkire (Hindi: अरुन्दाठी किरकिरे; born 31 May 1980) is an Indian former cricketer who played as a right-handed batter and occasional wicket-keeper. She appeared in one Test match and 30 One Day Internationals for India between 2000 and 2005. Her highest WODI score is 106 and she also has one half-century in the one-day version of the sport. She played domestic cricket for Madhya Pradesh and Railways.
