= Clare O'Leary (cricketer) =

Irish cricketer (born 1967)

Personal information
- Full name: Clare Mary O'Leary
- Born: 2 June 1967 (age 59); Dublin, Ireland
- Batting: Right-handed
- Bowling: Right-arm medium
- Role: Batter

International information
- National side: Ireland (1996–2003)
- Only Test (cap 7): 30 July 2000 v Pakistan
- ODI debut (cap 31): 18 July 1996 v New Zealand
- Last ODI: 26 July 2003 v Scotland

Career statistics
Competition	WTest	WODI	WLA
Matches	1	37	38
Runs scored	0	570	570
Batting average	0.00	18.38	18.38
100s/50s	0/0	0/1	0/1
Top score	0	53*	53*
Catches/stumpings	0/–	7/–	7/–
- Source: CricketArchive, 1 December 2021

Clare Mary O'Leary (born 2 June 1967) is an Irish former cricketer who played as a right-handed batter. She appeared in one Test match and 37 One Day Internationals for Ireland between 1996 and 2003.
