= Bindeshwari Goyal =

Indian cricketer (born 1979)

Personal information
- Full name: Bindeshwari Goyal
- Born: 1 June 1979 (age 47); Indore, India
- Batting: Right-handed
- Bowling: Right-arm off break
- Role: Bowler

International information
- National side: India (2002–2003)
- Test debut (cap 53): 14 January 2002 v England
- Last Test: 14 August 2002 v England
- ODI debut (cap 65): 7 March 2002 v South Africa
- Last ODI: 2 February 2003 v New Zealand

Domestic team information
- Years: Team
- 1999/00–2001/02: Madhya Pradesh

Career statistics
Competition	WTest	WODI	WLA
Matches	3	4	21
Runs scored	1	1	104
Batting average	0.50	–	14.85
100s/50s	0/0	0/0	0/0
Top score	1*	1*	27
Balls bowled	738	168	973
Wickets	5	4	33
Bowling average	42.60	20.25	13.81
5 wickets in innings	0	0	1
10 wickets in match	0	0	0
Best bowling	2/23	3/3	5/16
Catches/stumpings	0/–	0/–	3/–
- Source: CricketArchive, 24 June 2022

Bindeshwari Goyal (Hindi: बिन्देश्वरी गोयल; born 1 June 1979) is an Indian former cricketer who played as a right-arm off break bowler. She appeared in three Test matches and four One Day Internationals for India in 2002 and 2003. She played domestic cricket for Madhya Pradesh.
