= Davina Pratt =

Irish cricketer (born 1969)

Personal information
- Full name: Davina Margaret Pratt
- Born: 29 September 1969 (age 57); Cavan, Ireland
- Batting: Right-handed
- Bowling: Right-arm medium
- Role: Bowler

International information
- National side: Ireland (1997–2002)
- ODI debut (cap 34): 8 August 1997 v South Africa
- Last ODI: 26 July 2002 v India

Career statistics
Competition	WODI	WLA
Matches	8	9
Runs scored	19	28
Batting average	4.75	5.60
100s/50s	0/0	0/0
Top score	8*	9
Balls bowled	208	250
Wickets	3	3
Bowling average	58.33	70.00
5 wickets in innings	0	0
10 wickets in match	0	0
Best bowling	2/41	2/41
Catches/stumpings	2/–	2/–
- Source: CricketArchive, 21 June 2022

Davina Margaret Pratt (born 29 September 1969) is an Irish former cricketer who played as a right-arm medium bowler. She appeared in eight One Day Internationals for Ireland between 1997 and 2002, including playing at the 1997 World Cup.
