= Sunetra Paranjpe =

Indian cricketer (born 1980)

Personal information
- Full name: Sunetra Paranjpe
- Born: 9 May 1980 (age 46); Bombay, India
- Batting: Right-handed
- Bowling: Right-arm medium
- Role: Batter; occasional wicket-keeper

International information
- National side: India (2002–2007)
- Test debut (cap 61): 14 August 2002 v England
- Last Test: 18 February 2006 v Australia
- ODI debut (cap 67): 11 July 2002 v New Zealand
- Last ODI: 5 March 2007 v England

Domestic team information
- Years: Team
- 2000/01: Mumbai
- 2002/03–2004/05: Railways
- 2006/07: Mumbai
- 2007/08: Railways
- 2008/09–2012/13: Mumbai
- 2013/14: Gujarat
- 2015/16: Mumbai

Career statistics
Competition	WTest	WODI	WLA	WT20
Matches	3	28	143	33
Runs scored	33	322	3,058	529
Batting average	11.00	15.33	29.68	21.16
100s/50s	0/0	0/1	1/17	0/1
Top score	30	52	106	63*
Balls bowled	48	573	2,037	174
Wickets	0	11	48	8
Bowling average	–	37.81	25.79	17.62
5 wickets in innings	0	0	0	0
10 wickets in match	0	0	0	0
Best bowling	–	4/8	4/8	2/11
Catches/stumpings	3/–	3/0	38/2	10/3
- Source: CricketArchive, 22 August 2022

Sunetra Paranjpe (born 9 May 1980) is an Indian former cricketer and current cricket coach. She played as a right-handed batter, right-arm medium bowler and occasional wicket-keeper. She appeared in three Test matches and 28 One Day Internationals for India between 2002 and 2007. She played domestic cricket for Mumbai, Railways and Gujarat.

In February 2021 she was appointed as head coach of Baroda Women. She was also head coach of Trailblazers for the 2022 Women's T20 Challenge.
