= Fiona Fraser =

New Zealand cricketer (born 1980)

Personal information
- Full name: Fiona Elizabeth Fraser
- Born: 6 September 1980 (age 46); Wellington, New Zealand
- Batting: Right-handed
- Bowling: Right-arm medium
- Role: All-rounder

International information
- National side: New Zealand (2002)
- ODI debut (cap 90): 26 June 2002 v Netherlands
- Last ODI: 20 July 2002 v England

Domestic team information
- Years: Team
- 2000/01–2001/02: Canterbury
- 2002/03–2003/04: Wellington

Career statistics
Competition	WODI	WLA
Matches	5	24
Runs scored	94	359
Batting average	94.00	25.64
100s/50s	0/1	0/1
Top score	54*	54*
Balls bowled	–	558
Wickets	–	8
Bowling average	–	44.37
5 wickets in innings	–	0
10 wickets in match	–	0
Best bowling	–	2/27
Catches/stumpings	1/–	5/–
- Source: CricketArchive, 22 April 2021

Fiona Elizabeth Fraser (born 6 September 1980) is a New Zealand former cricketer who played as a right-handed batter and right-arm medium bowler. She appeared in 5 One Day Internationals for New Zealand in 2002. She played domestic cricket for Canterbury and Wellington.

Fraser joined the New Zealand Cricket Academy in 2001. She was selected for the New Zealand's tour of India in 2001, but the tour was later cancelled.
