= Jaya Sharma =

Indian cricketer (born 1980)

Personal information
- Full name: Jaya Sharma
- Born: 17 September 1980 (age 46); Ghaziabad, India
- Batting: Left-handed
- Bowling: Right-arm medium
- Role: Batter

International information
- National side: India (2002–2008)
- Only Test (cap 58): 19 March 2002 v South Africa
- ODI debut (cap 62): 6 January 2002 v England
- Last ODI: 8 November 2008 v Australia
- Only T20I (cap 14): 28 October 2008 v Australia

Domestic team information
- Years: Team
- 1999/00–2001/02: Delhi
- 2002/03–2008/09: Railways
- 2010/11–2012/13: Delhi
- 2013/14–2014/15: Rajasthan

Career statistics
Competition	WTest	WODI	WT20I	WLA
Matches	1	77	1	176
Runs scored	24	2,091	5	5,336
Batting average	24.00	30.75	5.00	36.05
100s/50s	0/0	2/14	0/0	5/36
Top score	24	138*	5	138*
Catches/stumpings	0/–	11/–	0/–	3/–
- Source: CricketArchive, 23 June 2022

Jaya Sharma (born 17 September 1980) is an Indian former cricketer who played as a left-handed batter. She appeared in one Test match, 77 One Day Internationals and one Twenty20 International for India between 2002 and 2008, including playing at the 2005 World Cup. She played domestic cricket for Delhi, Railways and Rajasthan.

She was the first female recipient of the BCCI Player of the Year award, in 2007. Her 138* against Pakistan at the 2005–06 Women's Asia Cup is the third highest score for India in Women's ODIs. She scored another century against the visiting Australians in 2007.

== One Day International centuries ==
Runs	Match	Opponents	City	Venue	Year
138*	47	Pakistan	Karachi, Pakistan	National Stadium	2005
104*	59	Australia	Chennai, India	M. A. Chidambaram Stadium	2007
