= Rachel Pullar =

New Zealand cricketer (born 1977)

Personal information
- Full name: Rachel Jane Pullar
- Born: 3 June 1977 (age 49); Balclutha, Otago, New Zealand
- Batting: Right-handed
- Bowling: Right-arm medium
- Role: Bowler

International information
- National side: New Zealand (1997–2005)
- ODI debut (cap 72): 5 November 1997 v Australia
- Last ODI: 7 April 2005 v India

Domestic team information
- Years: Team
- 1997/98: Central Districts
- 1998/99–2004/05: Otago

Career statistics
Competition	WODI	WFC	WLA
Matches	51	1	120
Runs scored	253	17	1,427
Batting average	12.04	17.00	19.28
100s/50s	0/0	0/0	0/7
Top score	27*	13*	78
Balls bowled	2,591	186	5,937
Wickets	74	2	149
Bowling average	16.48	38.00	20.00
5 wickets in innings	2	0	2
10 wickets in match	0	0	0
Best bowling	5/7	2/60	5/7
Catches/stumpings	14/–	1/–	35/–
- Source: CricketArchive, 1 November 2021

Rachel Jane Pullar (born 3 June 1977) is a New Zealand former cricketer who played primarily as a right-arm medium bowler. She appeared in 51 One Day Internationals for New Zealand between 1997 and 2005, and she twice claimed five-wickets in an innings. She played domestic cricket for Central Districts and Otago.
