= Jhulan Goswami =

Former Indian cricketer (born 1982)

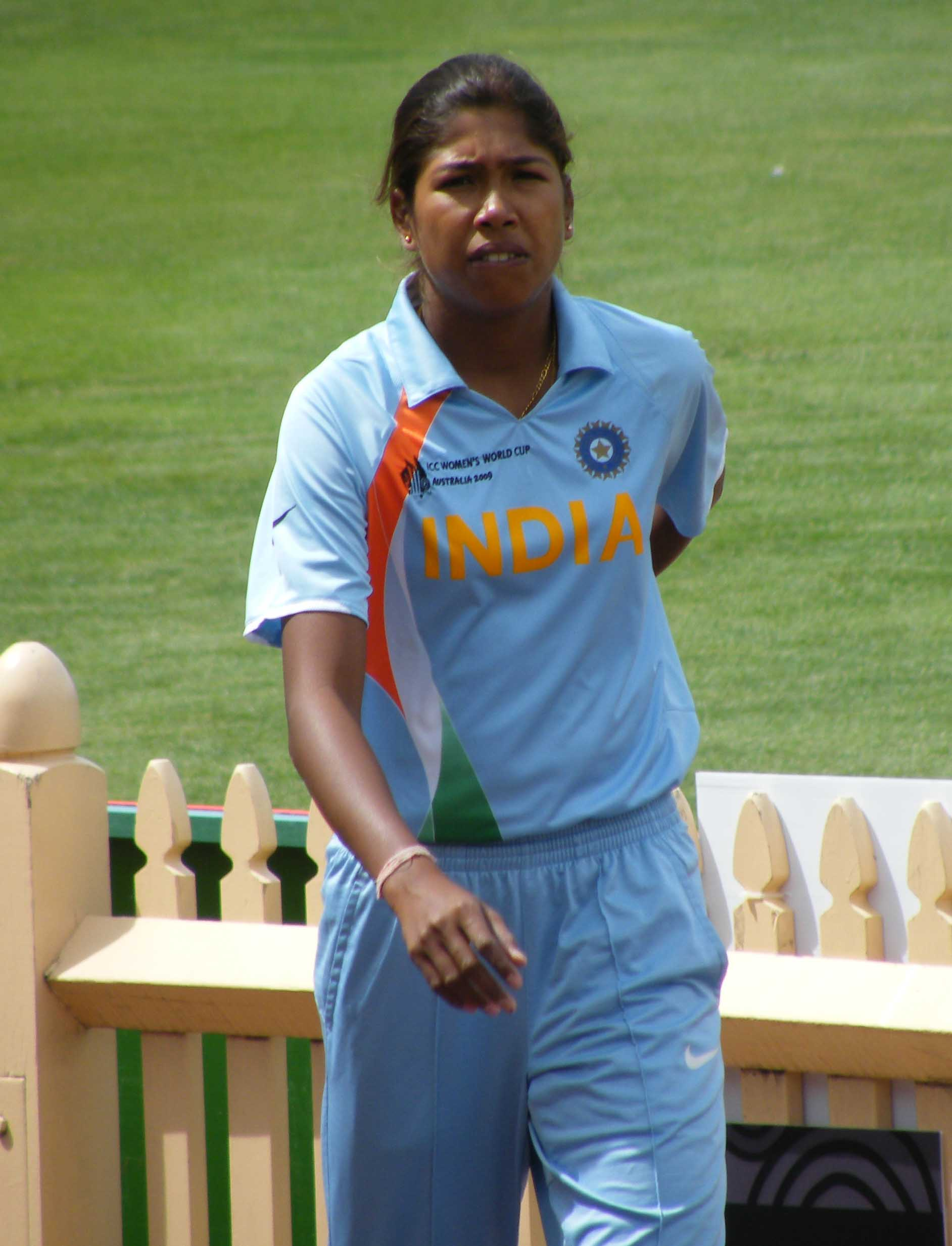
- Goswami in 2009

Personal information
- Full name: Jhulan Goswami
- Born: 25 November 1982 (age 43); Chakdaha, West Bengal, India
- Nickname: Babul, Chakda Express
- Height: 5 ft 11 in (1.80 m)
- Batting: Right-handed
- Bowling: Right-arm medium-fast
- Role: Bowler

International information
- National side: India (2002–2022)
- Test debut (cap 52): 14 January 2002 v England
- Last Test: 30 September 2021 v Australia
- ODI debut (cap 61): 6 January 2002 v England
- Last ODI: 24 September 2022 v England
- ODI shirt no.: 25
- T20I debut (cap 3): 5 August 2006 v England
- Last T20I: 10 June 2018 v Bangladesh

Domestic team information
- Years: Team
- 1999/00: Bengal
- 2000/01–2005/06: Air India
- 2007/08–present: Bengal
- 2018–2020: Trailblazers

Career statistics
Competition	WTest	WODI	WT20I	WLA
Matches	12	204	68	340
Runs scored	291	1226	405	3,438
Batting average	24.25	14.61	10.94	20.38
100s/50s	0/2	0/1	0/0	1/11
Top score	69	57	37*	120*
Balls bowled	2,266	10,005	1,351	16,178
Wickets	44	255	56	448
Bowling average	17.36	22.04	21.94	18.72
5 wickets in innings	3	2	1	3
10 wickets in match	1	0	0	0
Best bowling	5/25	6/31	5/11	6/31
Catches/stumpings	5/–	69/–	23/–	132/–
Medal record
Representing India
Women's cricket
ODI World Cup
Runner-up	2005 South Africa
Runner-up	2017 England and Wales
Asia Cup
Winner	2004 Sri Lanka
Winner	2005-06 Pakistan
Winner	2006 India
Winner	2008 Sri Lanka
Winner	2012 China
Winner	2016 Thailand
Runner-up	2018 Malaysia
- Source: ESPNcricinfo, 24 September 2022

Jhulan Goswami (born 25 November 1982) is an Indian former cricketer. She played for the India women's national cricket team from 2002 to 2022.

She played as a right-arm medium fast bowler and right-handed batter. She is one of the fastest (female) bowler of all times and considered one of the greatest bowlers to ever play the sport. She played 204 ODI matches before her retirement from international cricket in 2022, taking 255 wickets, and holds the record for taking the most number of wickets in Women's One Day International cricket.

Goswami won the ICC Women's Player of the Year award in 2007 and the M.A. Chidambaram trophy for Best Women's Cricketer in 2011. She became number one in the Women's ODI bowling rankings of ICC in January 2016 and regained it in March 2019.

== Career ==
Goswami was born to a middle-class family in the town of Chakdaha in the Nadia district of West Bengal on 25 November 1982. She took up cricket at the age of 15, and was previously a football fan. Goswami began to take interest in cricket when she watched the 1992 Cricket World Cup on TV. She took further interest in the sport after watching Australian batter Belinda Clark in the 1997 Women's Cricket World Cup. As Chakdaha did not have any cricket facilities at the time, Goswami travelled to Kolkata to play cricket.

Soon after finishing her training in Kolkata, Goswami was called up to the Bengal women's cricket team. At the age of 19, she made her international debut in 2002 in a one-day International Match against England in Chennai. Her Test debut came on 14 January 2002 against England in Lucknow.

Goswami along with Mithali Raj guided the Indian Women's Cricket team to their first Test series win in England in 2006–07 season. During the same season, Goswami helped India to get their first victory against England, making a fifty as nightwatchman in the first Test at Leicester and taking her career best match figures of 10/78, with 5/33 in the 1st innings and 5/45 in the 2nd innings – in the second test at Taunton. In 2007 Jhulan was a member of the Asian squad in the Afro-Asia tournament in India and also won the ICC Women's Cricketer of the Year when no Indian male cricketer had bagged an individual ICC yearly award.

Later in 2008, she took over the captaincy of the team from Mithali Raj and held it till 2011. In 2008, she also became the fourth woman to reach 100 wickets in ODIs at the 2008 Women's Asia Cup. She captained India in 25 ODI and was awarded the Arjuna Award in 2010. In 2012 she became second Indian women cricketer to receive Padma Shri after Diana Edulji.

She has 44 Test wickets to her name in 12 matches. Overall she has 355 international wickets in 284 games and has scored 1922 runs with three half centuries. She is the highest wicket taker in WODIs going past Australian Cathryn Fitzpatrick's record of 180 wickets. She achieved the feat during the Women's Quadrangular Series in South Africa. On 7 February 2018 Jhulan became the first woman cricketer to reach 200 wickets in one day cricket. She has 255 wickets in 200 matches at an average of 22.04 with two 5 wicket hauls and 4 four wicket hauls. In ODIs she has 1226 runs in 204 matches. In 2011, where India failed to win against New Zealand, she took her career-best 6/31.

In May 2017, Goswami became the leading wicket-taker in ODIs when she took her 181st wicket against South Africa at PUK Oval, Potchefstroom, surpassing Australia's Cathryn Fitzpatrick.

Goswami was part of the Indian team that reached the final of the 2017 Women's Cricket World Cup where they lost to England by nine runs.

On 19 September 2017, Jhulan Goswami said that a biopic on her is in the making with the working title Chakdaha Express. The biopic will be directed by Sushanta Das and will trace Goswami's journey from the Vivekananda Park nets in Kolkata to the Lord's cricket ground in London, where India lost the World Cup final against England in July.

In April 2018, an Indian postage stamp was issued in her honour. In March 2022, in the 2022 Women's Cricket World Cup, Goswami became the first bowler to take 250 wickets in WODI cricket.

In September 2018, against Sri Lanka, she took her 300th wicket in international cricket. In November 2020, Goswami was nominated for the ICC Women's ODI Cricketer of the Decade award.

In May 2021, she was named in India's Test squad for their one-off match against England. In January 2022, she was named in India's team for the 2022 Women's Cricket World Cup in New Zealand.

On 12 March 2022, she became the overall highest wicket taker in the Women's Cricket World Cup overtaking previous record of Lyn Fullston.

Goswami retired from international cricket in September 2022, with her final match coming against England at Lord's, with India winning by 16 runs. She will continue to be in the Bengal squad as a mentor/player.

== Coaching career ==
On 2 February 2023, she joined the Mumbai-based Women's Premier League franchise Mumbai Indians as a bowling coach and mentor.

== Awards, honors and titles ==
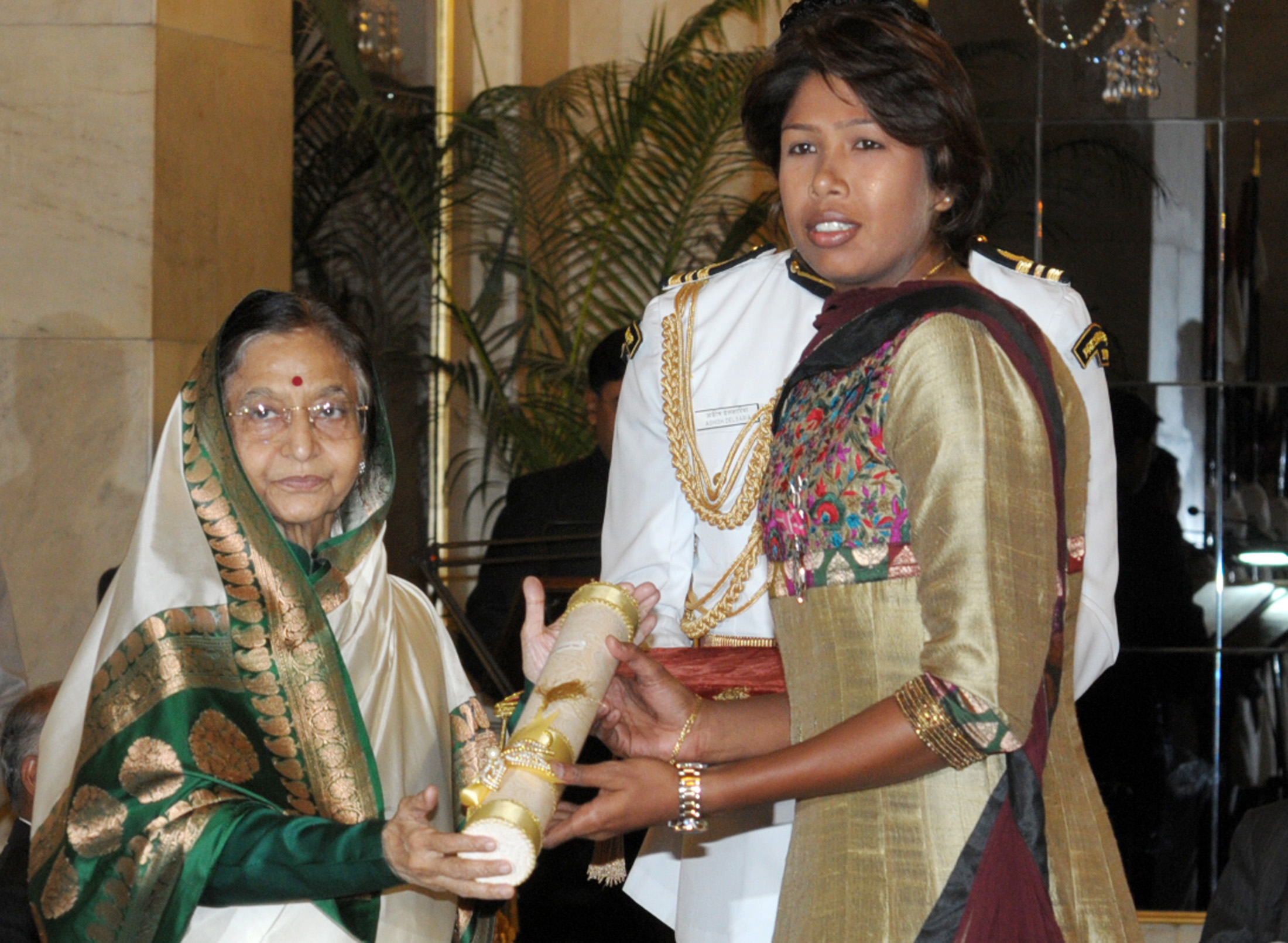
The President, Pratibha Patil, presenting the Padma Shri Award to Jhulan Goswami, in New Delhi on 22 March 2012

- 2007 – ICC Women's Cricketer of the Year
- Captain of Indian Women's Cricket Team (2008–2011)
- Fastest Bowler
- 2010 – Arjuna Award
- 2012 – Padma Shri
- Leading International Wicket Taker

== Legacy ==
- Chakda Xpress, the biopic of Jhulan Goswami, directed by Prosit Roy, starring Anushka Sharma, will be premiered on Netflix. By this she is the second Indian female cricketer to have a biopic to her credit following Mithali Raj (Taapsee Pannu portrayed her in 2022 film Shabaash Mithu, a biopic on Mithali Raj).

== See also ==
- East Bengal Club – Indian multi-sports club based in Kolkata

Preceded by Karen Rolton	ICC Women's Cricketer of the Year; 2007	Succeeded by Charlotte Edwards
