= Rebecca Rolls =

New Zealand cricketer and footballer

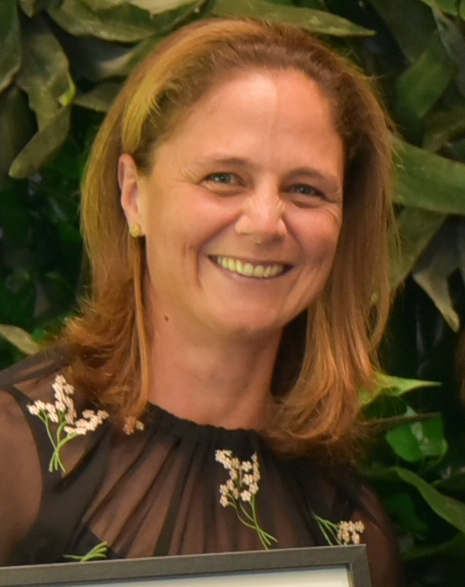
- Rolls in 2020

Personal information
- Full name: Rebecca Jane Rolls
- Date of birth: 22 August 1975 (age 51)
- Place of birth: Napier, New Zealand
- Height: 1.78 m (5 ft 10 in)
- Position: Goalkeeper

Team information
- Current team: Three Kings United

Senior career*
Years	Team	Apps	(Gls)
- Metro F.C.
- Three Kings United

International career^{‡}
1994–2015	New Zealand	21	(0)
- Cricket career
Cricket information
- Batting: Right-handed
- Role: Wicket-keeper
International information
- National side: New Zealand (1997–2007)
- Only Test (cap 125): 21 August 2004 v England
- ODI debut (cap 70): 28 January 1997 v Pakistan
- Last ODI: 5 March 2007 v Australia
- T20I debut (cap 7): 5 August 2004 v England
- Last T20I: 18 October 2006 v Australia
Domestic team information
- Years: Team
- 1990/91–1996/97: Central Districts
- 1997/98–2006/07: Auckland
Career statistics
Competition	WTest	WODI	WT20I	WLA
Matches	1	104	2	236
Runs scored	71	2,201	80	5,513
Batting average	71.00	25.01	40.00	26.63
100s/50s	0/1	2/12	0/0	6/28
Top score	71	114	41	118
Balls bowled	–	–	–	72
Wickets	–	–	–	2
Bowling average	–	–	–	31.00
5 wickets in innings	–	–	–	0
10 wickets in match	–	–	–	0
Best bowling	–	–	–	2/17
Catches/stumpings	1/0	90/43	2/1	194/120
- Source: CricketArchive, 19 April 2021
- * Club domestic league appearances and goals ‡ National team caps and goals as of 11:03, 16 June 2015 (UTC)

Rebecca Jane Rolls (born 22 August 1975) is a New Zealand former cricketer and association footballer who represented New Zealand in both sports. In cricket, she played as a wicket-keeper and right-handed batter, and appeared in 1 Test match, 104 One Day Internationals and 2 Twenty20 Internationals for New Zealand between 1997 and 2007. She played domestic cricket for Central Districts and Auckland. In football, she made 21 appearances for New Zealand. She is the chief executive of the New Zealand Sport Integrity Commission.

== Cricket ==
Rolls had a long One Day International career, representing New Zealand in 104 matches, as well as 1 Test match. She was only the second New Zealand woman to reach the 100 ODI milestone, after Debbie Hockley. She was a wicketkeeper batter. She played in the victorious Women's Cricket World Cup at Lincoln in 2000 and she also played for the Auckland Hearts in the State League. She was born in Napier.

Rebecca Rolls is also the first female cricketer to have completed the double of scoring 2000 runs and effecting 100 dismissals as wicketkeeper in WODI history

== Women's One Day International centuries ==
Runs	Match	Opponents	City	Venue	Year
114	48	Australia	Lincoln, New Zealand	Bert Sutcliffe Oval	2002
104*	99	Australia	Chennai, India	Chemplast Cricket Ground	2007

== Football ==
Rolls has played internationally for New Zealand as a goalkeeper. She made her Football Ferns debut in a 0–1 loss to Bulgaria on 24 August 1994 and ended her international career with 11 caps to her credit.

Sixteen years later Rolls made a shock comeback for the national team, being called into the 2012 Cyprus Cup squad. In July 2012 she was named in the New Zealand party for the London Olympics. She also played in the final of the 2013 Valais Cup competition for New Zealand against the People's Republic of China. She was part of New Zealand's squad at the 2015 FIFA Women's World Cup in Canada.

== Post-sport career ==
Following her playing career, Rolls has worked for the police, the Serious Fraud Office and the Department of Corrections. As of July 2024, she is the chief executive of the New Zealand Sport Integrity Commission.

== Personal life ==
Of Māori descent, Rolls affiliates to the Ngāti Porou iwi.
