= Frances King (cricketer) =

New Zealand cricketer

Personal information
- Full name: Frances Sarah King
- Born: 28 November 1980; Wellington, New Zealand
- Died: 11 September 2003 (aged 22); Wellington, New Zealand
- Batting: Right-handed
- Bowling: Right-arm fast-medium
- Role: Bowler

International information
- National side: New Zealand (2002–2003)
- ODI debut (cap 88): 23 February 2002 v Australia
- Last ODI: 8 February 2003 v Australia

Domestic team information
- Years: Team
- 1996/97–2002/03: Wellington

Career statistics
Competition	WODI	WLA
Matches	15	71
Runs scored	81	716
Batting average	11.57	14.91
100s/50s	0/0	0/0
Top score	31	45*
Balls bowled	649	2,913
Wickets	21	71
Bowling average	19.23	23.50
5 wickets in innings	0	0
10 wickets in match	0	0
Best bowling	4/24	4/24
Catches/stumpings	2/–	9/–
- Source: CricketArchive, 17 November 2021

Frances Sarah King (28 November 1980 – 11 September 2003) was a New Zealand cricketer who played as a right-arm fast-medium bowler. She appeared in 15 One Day Internationals for New Zealand in 2002 and 2003, taking 21 wickets at an average of 19.23. She played domestic cricket for Wellington.

In 2001, she was awarded the Trish McKelvey Trophy for the most outstanding player in the national under-21 tournament. In February 2001, she made her international debut against Australia.

King died suddenly of meningococcal meningitis in Wellington in 2003, at the age of 22.
