= Anna Dodd =

New Zealand cricketer

Personal information
- Full name: Anna Maree Dodd
- Born: 24 October 1980 (age 46); Foxton, New Zealand
- Batting: Right-handed
- Bowling: Right-arm off break
- Role: Bowler

International information
- National side: New Zealand (2002–2006)
- ODI debut (cap 86): 20 February 2002 v Australia
- Last ODI: 28 October 2006 v Australia

Domestic team information
- Years: Team
- 1996/97–2008/09: Wellington

Career statistics
Competition	WODI	WLA	WT20
Matches	31	136	5
Runs scored	155	886	17
Batting average	17.22	14.06	–
100s/50s	0/0	0/0	0/0
Top score	20*	46	8*
Balls bowled	1,243	5,975	114
Wickets	28	133	6
Bowling average	26.96	23.75	16.66
5 wickets in innings	0	1	0
10 wickets in match	0	0	0
Best bowling	3/13	5/7	2/13
Catches/stumpings	10/–	42/–	4/–
- Source: CricketArchive, 17 November 2021

Anna Maree Dodd (née Corbin; born 24 October 1980) is a New Zealand former cricketer who played as a right-arm off break bowler. She appeared in 31 One Day Internationals for New Zealand between 2002 and 2006. She played domestic cricket for Wellington.

Dodd was born in Foxton, in New Zealand's Manawatū-Whanganui region. She was first selected in a New Zealand squad for a tour of India in November and December 2001. That tour was cancelled, but Dodd eventually made her ODI debut against Australia in February 2002. When New Zealand toured Europe later in the year, she took what would be career-best figures against the Netherlands, finishing with 3/13 from five overs. At the 2005 World Cup in South Africa, Dodd played in five of her team's seven matches, taking three wickets with a best of 2/15 against Sri Lanka. Her last international matches came in October 2006, in an ODI series against Australia. She played in 31 ODIs in total, taking 28 wickets.
