= Haidee Tiffen =

New Zealand cricketer

Haidee Tiffen MNZM
- Tiffen in 2011

Personal information
- Full name: Haidee Maree Tiffen
- Born: 4 September 1979 (age 47); Timaru, New Zealand
- Batting: Right-handed
- Bowling: Right-arm medium
- Role: All-rounder

International information
- National side: New Zealand (1999–2009)
- Test debut (cap 121): 27 November 2003 v India
- Last Test: 21 August 2004 v England
- ODI debut (cap 77): 17 February 1999 v South Africa
- Last ODI: 22 March 2009 v England
- T20I debut (cap 9): 5 August 2004 v England
- Last T20I: 15 February 2009 v Australia

Domestic team information
- Years: Team
- 1997/98–2008/09: Canterbury
- 2001–2002: Sussex

Career statistics
Competition	WTest	WODI	WT20I	WLA
Matches	2	117	9	254
Runs scored	124	2,919	121	6,406
Batting average	124.00	30.72	17.28	34.62
100s/50s	0/1	1/18	0/0	3/34
Top score	66*	100	30	132*
Balls bowled	–	1,656	–	4,092
Wickets	–	49	–	129
Bowling average	–	19.48	–	18.10
5 wickets in innings	–	0	–	1
10 wickets in match	–	0	–	0
Best bowling	–	4/43	–	5/51
Catches/stumpings	1/–	32/–	6/–	95/–
- Source: CricketArchive, 19 April 2021

Haidee Maree Tiffen MNZM (born 4 September 1979) is a former New Zealand cricket coach and player, appearing in 2 Test matches, 117 One Day Internationals and 9 Twenty20 Internationals for New Zealand between 1999 and 2009. She later coached the New Zealand women's team between 2015 and 2019. Outside of cricket, Tiffen is a school teacher, and she was appointed principal of Riccarton High School in 2026.

== Early life ==
Tiffen was born in Timaru on 4 September 1979 and attended Timaru Girls' High School, where she was head girl in 1997.

== Cricket career ==
Tiffen played as an all-rounder, batting right-handed and bowling right-arm medium. She appeared in 2 Test matches, 117 One Day Internationals and 9 Twenty20 Internationals for New Zealand between 1999 and 2009. She played domestic cricket for Canterbury, as well as playing two seasons for Sussex.

Once acknowledged as one of the best all-rounders in the game, Tiffen announced her retirement after leading her side to the final of the 2009 Women's Cricket World Cup. At that time, her 2,919 career ODI runs were surpassed by only six other women, and for New Zealand only Debbie Hockley exceeded her. She was short-listed for the ICC Women's Player of the Year Award in 2006, eventually losing out to Karen Rolton.

Tiffen was appointed a Member of the New Zealand Order of Merit in the 2011 New Year Honours, for services to women's cricket.

She was head coach for New Zealand women's team from April 2015 to March 2019.

== Teaching career ==
Tiffen studied at the University of Canterbury, graduating with a Bachelor of Education degree and Graduate Diploma of Teaching and Learning (Secondary). She worked as a relieving teacher at Kaiapoi High School before her appointment as New Zealand coach, and returned there as a physical education and health teacher after her coaching term. In 2022, Tiffen moved to Rangiora High School, rising to become deputy principal. She was appointed principal of Riccarton High School in 2026.
