= South Australian Women's Football League =

- Sport: Australian rules football
- Founded: 1991, Adelaide
- First season: 1991
- Folded: 2017
- No. of teams: 10
- Country: Australia
- Website: http://www.sawfl.org.au/

The South Australian Women's Football League (SAWFL) was the governing body and top level of women's Australian rules football in the state of South Australia from 1991–2016. In 2017, the SAWFL merged with the South Australian Amateur Football League to form the Adelaide Footy League, being replaced by the SANFLW.

== History ==
In 1990, a group of South Australian women instigated the preparation to establish the South Australian Women's Football League (SAWFL) after an exhibition match between the Victorian Women's Football League (VWFL) and some sporting identities in South Australia proved to be a huge success. The founder of the SAWFL, Gina Dutschke, with the assistance of Jenny Williams, were then able to gather enough interest from sportswomen throughout the metropolitan region to form a league of their own in 1991.

Clubs that were instrumental in the early years the League were the Cougars, Thunderbirds, Hectorville, Brighton, Modbury, Para Hills, Kilburn, Edwardstown, Pooraka, Goodwood, North Adelaide, West Adelaide, McLaren Vale and Sturt. The League comprised four clubs in its final year: Woodville-West Torrens, Morphettville Park, Port Adelaide and Greenacres.

SAWFL collaborated with the SANFL's Affiliated Junior District Leagues with the planning of a Youth Girls competition which commenced in the 2008 season. Over 900 players had registered with SAWFL since 1991.

Under the guidance of the President, Georgi Iley, the League progressed forward in generating a player pathway for females of all ages in South Australia.

At the conclusion of the 2015 season, the AFL announced that there would be a ten-match Exhibition Series in 2016, which included a South Australia v NSW/ACT State of Origin match and a South Australia Reds v South Australia Blues match, and the formation of the AFLW in 2017. Subsequently, the SAWFL merged with the SAAFL to form the Adelaide Footy League, becoming the women's competition of that League, and was replaced by the SANFLW from 2017.

League members who long represented SA at the National Women's AFL Championships and played 250 games or more were Catherine Mulvihill (305 games), Tiffany Lee (302 games), Cheryl Wills (268 games), Nancy Tidswell (266 games), Linda Mounsey (252 games) and Cassie Hartley (251 games).

== Clubs ==
=== North & North East of the CBD ===
- Adelaide University Football Club
- Angle Vale
- Gaza
- Greenacres Women's Football Club
- Ingle Farm Women's Football Club
- Modbury Women's Football Club
- North Pines
- Salisbury

=== West of the CBD ===
- Port Adelaide Women's Football Club
- West Adelaide Women's Football Club
- Western Suburbs

=== South of the CBD & Hills ===
- Aldinga Football Club
- Christies Beach Football Club
- Flinders University Football Club
- Happy Valley Football Club
- Ironbank Cherry Gardens
- Kangarilla Football Club
- Kenilworth
- Morphettville Park Football Club
- Mount Barker
- Mount Lofty District Football Club

== Premierships ==
| Year | Division 1 | Division 2 | Division 3 | Division 4 | Division 5 | U/18 |
|---|---|---|---|---|---|---|
| 2017 | Adelaide University | Christies Beach | Gaza | Adelaide University | Strathalbyn | Morphettville Park |
| 2016 | Morphettville Park | Mount Barker | – | – | – | |
| 2015 | Morphettville Park | Adelaide University | – | – | – | Salisbury |
| 2014 | Morphettville Park | Salisbury | – | – | – | Morphettville Park |
| 2013 | Greenacres | – | – | – | – | Port Adelaide |
| 2012 | West Adelaide | – | – | – | – | Port Adelaide |
| 2011 | Eagles | – | – | – | – | – |
| 2010 | Eagles | – | – | – | – | – |
| 2009 | Greenacres | – | – | – | – | – |
| 2008 | Eagles | – | – | – | – | – |
| 2007 | Eagles | – | – | – | – | – |
| 2006 | Eagles | – | – | – | – | – |
| 2005 | Eagles | – | – | – | – | – |
| 2004 | Sturt | – | – | – | – | – |
| 2003 | Goodwood | – | – | – | – | – |
| 2002 | Eagles | – | – | – | – | – |
| 2001 | North Adelaide | – | – | – | – | – |
| 2000 | North Adelaide | – | – | – | – | – |
| 1999 | Edwardstown | – | – | – | – | – |
| 1998 | Edwardstown | – | – | – | – | – |
| 1997 | Edwardstown | – | – | – | – | – |
| 1996 | Edwardstown | – | – | – | – | – |
| 1995 | Hectorville | – | – | – | – | – |
| 1994 | Hectorville | – | – | – | – | – |
| 1993 | Edwardstown | – | – | – | – | – |
| 1992 | Central District Cougars | – | – | – | – | – |
| 1991 | Thunderbirds | – | – | – | – | – |

== Honours ==
=== Division 1 ===
==== Dutschke Medal (Best and Fairest) ====
The Dutschke Medal is named after Gina Dutschke, the founder of the South Australian Women's Football League, back in 1990. The Medal is awarded to the best and fairest overall of the season as determined by the Umpires. This prestigious award is presented to the recipient at the end of season Presentation Dinner.

| Year | Player | Club |
|---|---|---|
| 1991 | Laura Giaretto | Southern CD Cougars |
| 1992 | Tiffany Lee | Hectorville |
| 1993 | Tiffany Lee | Hectorville |
| 1994 | Tiffany Lee | |
| 1995 | Tiffany Lee | |
| 1996 | Robyn Polhner | |
| 1997 | Robyn Polhner | |
| 1998 | Ros Kitschke | West Adelaide |
| 1999 | Ros Kitschke | West Adelaide |
| 2000 | Tiffany Lee | North Adelaide |
| 2001 | Robyn Polhner | North Adelaide |
| 2002 | Sarah Masiero | Eagles |
| 2003 | Tiffany Lee | North Adelaide |
| 2004 | Lauren Ebsary | Sturt |
| 2005 | Lauren Ebsary | Sturt |
| 2006 | Sarah Masiero | Eagles |
| 2007 | Jess Openshaw | Eagles |
| 2008 | Michele Reid | Greenacres |
| 2009 | Cassandra Hartley | Eagles |
| 2010 | Michele Reid | Greenacres |
| 2011 | Emma Sampson | Port Adelaide |
| 2012 | Cassandra Hartley | West Adelaide |
| 2013 | Michele Reid | Greenacres |
| 2014 | Michele Reid | Greenacres |
| 2015 | Emma Sampson | West Adelaide |
| 2016 | Chloe Scheer | Modbury |
| 2017 | Rachelle Martin | West Adelaide |
| 2018 | Brittany Perry | Salisbury |
| 2019 | Stephanie Walker | Adelaide University |

==== Glazbrook Medal (Leading Goakicker) ====
The Glazbrook Medal was named after Trudy Glazbrook, at the time was the league's longest running highest goalkicker. The Medal is awarded to the player with the highest number of goals kicked throughout the competition.

- 2019 Kiana Lee (SMOSH West Lakes)
- 2018 Kelly Barltrop (Adelaide University)
- 2017 Ruth Wallace (Adelaide University)
- 2016 Lexia Edwards (Morphettville Park)
- 2015 Emma Sampson (West Adelaide)
- 2014 Alexandra Price (Morphettville Park)
- 2013 Fiona Clancey (West Adelaide)
- 2012 Fiona Clancey (West Adelaide)
- 2011 Fiona Clancey (Eagles)
- 2010 Fiona Clancey (Eagles)
- 2009 Fiona Clancey (Eagles)
- 2008 Fiona Clancey (Eagles)
- 2007 Cheryl Wills (Eagles) & Kayla Pendleton (Eagles)
- 2006 Sarah Masiero (Eagles)
- 2005 Tiffany Lee (Sturt)
- 2004 No Award Given
- 2003 Fiona Clancy (West Adelaide)
- 2002 Fiona Clancy (West Adelaide)
- 2001 Tiffany Lee (North Adelaide)
- 2000 Tiffany Lee (North Adelaide)
- 1999 Melissa King (Edwardstown)
- 1998 Trudy Glazbrook & Sara Dennis
- 1997 Shelly Neller (Brighton)
- 1996 Trudy Glazbrook (Hectorville)
- 1995 Trudy Glazbrook (Hectorville)
- 1994 Trudy Glazbrook (Hectorville)
- 1993 Trudy Glazbrook (Hectorville)
- 1992 Tiffany Lee (Hectorville)
- 1991 Tiffany Lee (Hectorville)

==== Carmel Laube Medal (Player's Player) ====
The Carmel Laube Medal was named in memory and honour of Carmel Laube, who played for Edwardstown, and represented the State Squad until ill health. We fondly remember her time and contribution to the League. This medal is awarded to the player's player – the most respected player amongst peers in the competition.

- 2016 Lila Berry (Ingle Farm)
- 2015 Brooke Copeland (Greenacres)
- 2014 Nancy Tidswell (Central District) & Kaily Buchalka (Morphettville Park)
- 2013 Brooke Copeland (Greenacres)
- 2012 Emma Gibson (Central District)
- 2011 Kym Carter (Greenacres)
- 2010 Brittany Perry (Central District)
- 2009 Tess Baxter (Morphettville Park)
- 2008 Sarah Masiero (Eagles)
- 2007 Linda Mounsey (Morphettville Park)
- 2006 Sarah Masiero (Eagles)
- 2005 Emma Sampson (Eagles)
- 2004 Kelli Loehr (Port Adelaide)
- 2003 Zdravka Stepic (Greenacres)
- 2002 Kylie Tulloch (North Adelaide)
- 2001 Catherine Mulvihill (Eagles)
- 2000 Sheron Ford (West Adelaide)
- 1999 Melissa King (Edwardstown)

==== Pitman Medal (Rookie of the Year) ====
The Pitman Medal was named after Deb Pitman, a life member of SAWFL. This award is given to the Rookie of the Year. The highest number of votes for the first year player in SAWFL.

- 2017 Elysse Haussen (Flinders University)
- 2016 Ebony O'Dea (Adelaide University) & Ellen Maple (Mount Lofty)
- 2015 Jamilla Hull (Adelaide University)
- 2014 Justine Mules (Morphettville Park)
- 2013 Jess Sedunary (Ingle Farm)
- 2012 Charlea Taylor (Central District)
- 2011 Sharon Taylor (Modbury)
- 2010 Eliza Oates (Eagles)
- 2009 Danielle Goding (Greenacres)
- 2008 Kym Carter (Greenacres)
- 2007 Jessica Openshaw (Eagles)
- 2006 Sally Lynch (Greenacres)
- 2005 Michele Reid (Greenacres)
- 2004 Kris Britt (Sturt)
- 2003 Kelli Loehr (Port Adelaide)
- 2002 Megan
- 2001 Jayne Secker (Goodwood) & Lee Fata (West Adelaide)
- 2000 Rosa Zampogna (West Adelaide)
- 1999 Jonti Gray (Edwardstown)
- 1998 January Jackowiak (Edwardstown)
- 1997 Michelle O'Brien (McLaren Vale)

==== Amos Clarke Medal (Junior Development Award) ====
Sponsored by Murray Amos and Amanda Clarke, this award is presented to the highest ranked youngest player (18 or under) of the Dutschke Vote count.

- 2016 Chloe Scheer (Modbury)
- 2015 Chloe Scheer (Modbury)
- 2014 Chloe Goodes (Salisbury)
- 2013 Alexandra Price (Port Adelaide)
- 2012 Alexandra Price (Port Adelaide)
- 2011 Brittany Perry (Central District)
- 2010 Brittany Perry (Central District)
- 2009 Deni Varnhagen (Morphettville Park)
- 2008 Kaily Buchalka (Greenacres) & Hannah Johnson (Eagles)
- 2007 Teena Leicester (Greenacres)
- 2006 Megan Wilsdon (Eagles)
- 2005 Hannah Johnson (Eagles)
- 2004 Tess Baxter (Eagles)
- 2003 Kristy Lavery (Port Adelaide)
- 2002 Tess Baxter (Eagles)
- 2001 Balina WALTKE (Edwardstown)

==== Grand Final Best on Ground Medal ====
- 2017 Ruth Wallace (Adelaide University)
- 2016 Kirsty Degabriele (West Adelaide)
- 2015 Cat Williams (Morphettville Park)
- 2014 Courtney Cramey (Morphettville Park)
- 2013 Jacinta McKenzie (Greenacres)
- 2012 Kylie Guarino (West Adelaide)
- 2011 Eliza Oates (Eagles)
- 2010 Jess Openshaw (Eagles)
- 2009 Tiffany Lee (Greenacres)
- 2008 Cheryl Wills (Eagles)
- 2007 Tiffany Lee (Greenacres)
- 2006 Cassandra Hartley (Eagles)
- 2005 Catherine Mulvihill (Eagles)
- 2004 Sheron Ford (Sturt)
- 1992 Caroline Walters (Central District Cougars)

=== Division 2 ===
==== Mulvihill Medal (Best and Fairest) ====
The Dutschke Medal is named after Catherine Mulvihill, a SAWFL Life Member and the first player in the South Australian Women's Football League to reach the 300 games milestone The Medal is awarded to the best and fairest overall of the season as determined by the Umpires.

- 2016 Alana Browne (Christies Beach)
- 2015 Brittany Perry (Angle Vale)
- 2014 Danielle Stewart (Modbury)

==== Div 2 Leading Goalkicker ====
- 2016 Angela McTaggart (Morphettville Park)
- 2015 Lesley Burrows (Angle Vale)
- 2014 Sarah Allan (Salisbury)

==== Grand Final Best on Ground Medal ====
- 2017 Tonia Fielke (Christies Beach)
- 2016 Tara Robertson (Mount Barker)
- 2015 Brittany Perry (Angle Vale)
- 2014 Laura Millary (Salisbury)

=== U/18 ===
==== U/18 Leading Goalkicker ====
- 2016 Chloe Scheer (Modbury)
- 2015 Chelsea Salvemini (Angle Vale)
- 2014 Caitlen Teague (Modbury)
- 2013 Alexandra Price (Port Adelaide)
- 2012 Kimberly Hunter (Morphettville Park)

=== Club of the Year ===
SAWFL Club of the Year was introduced in 2011 to encourage increased professionalism within the League and its Affiliated Clubs. The introduction of the Club of the Year Award seeks to recognise the efforts of volunteers and officials that promote Women's Football and provide safe and sustainable Club environments.

- 2017 Christies Beach
- 2016 Mount Lofty
- 2015 Morphettville Park
- 2014 Modbury
- 2013 Modbury
- 2012 Port Adelaide
- 2011 Greenacres

== All Australian Selection ==
The All Australian team is selected from participants at the National Women's AFL Championships.

- 2013 Michele Reid
- 2011 Courtney Cramey
- 2009 Tess Baxter
- 2007 Jessica Openshaw
- 2006 Michele Reid
- 2005 Mary Ryan
- 2004 Lauren Ebsary, Kris Britt and Sheron Ford
- 2003 Mitzy Galic
- 2002 Mitzy Galic
- 2001 Mitzy Galic
- 2000 Mitzy Galic

== See also ==
- List of Australian rules football women's leagues
