= Alyssa Healy =

Australian cricketer (born 1990)

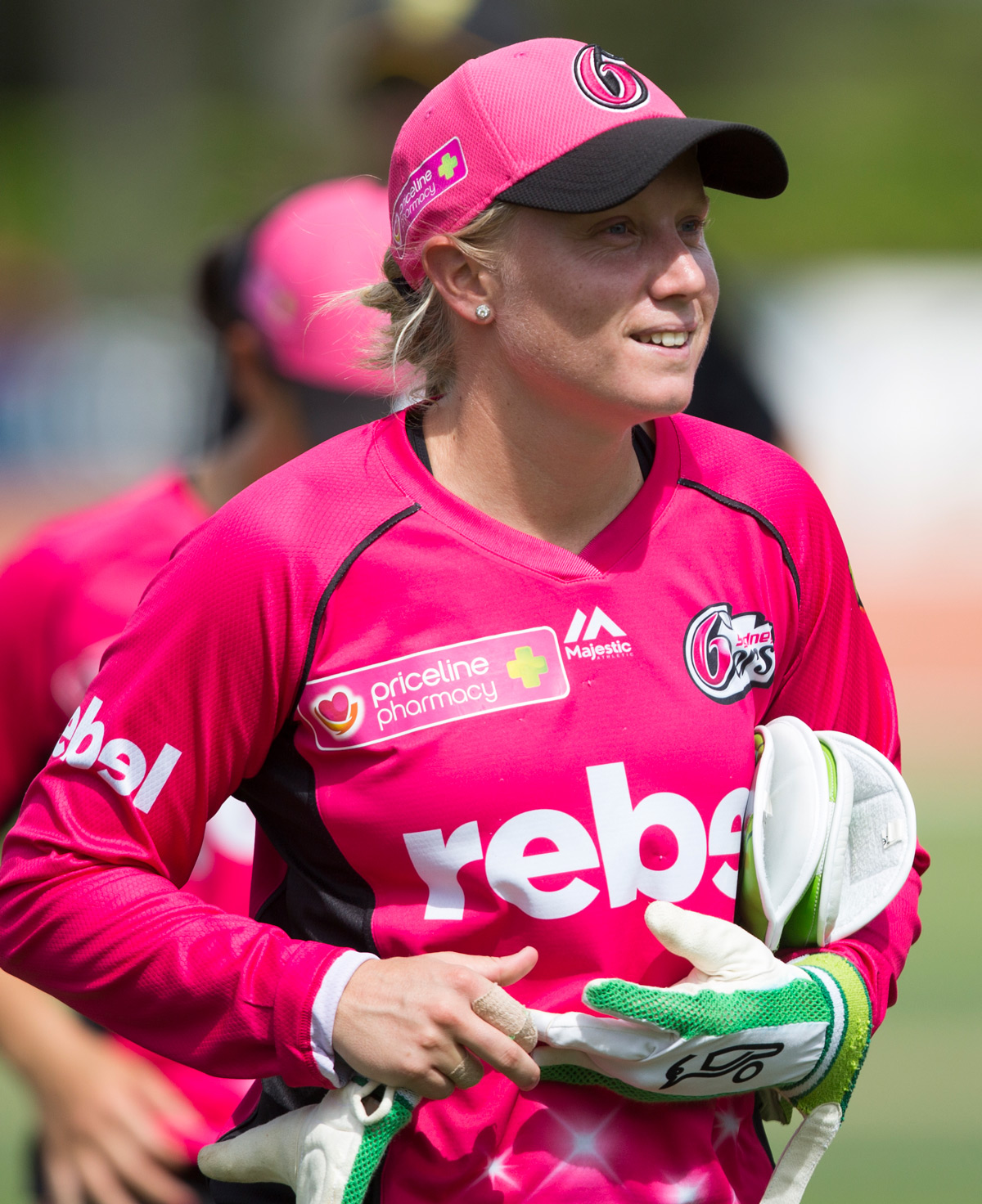
- Healy in 2016

Personal information
- Full name: Alyssa Jean Healy
- Born: 24 March 1990 (age 36); Gold Coast, Queensland, Australia
- Nickname: Midge
- Batting: Right-handed
- Role: Wicket-keeper-batter
- Relatives: Ian Healy (uncle); Ken Healy (uncle); Mitchell Starc (m. 2016)

International information
- National side: Australia (2010–2026)
- Test debut (cap 162): 22 January 2011 v England
- Last Test: 8 March 2026 v India
- ODI debut (cap 116): 10 February 2010 v New Zealand
- Last ODI: 1 March 2026 v India
- ODI shirt no.: 77
- T20I debut (cap 29): 21 February 2010 v New Zealand
- Last T20I: 11 October 2024 v Pakistan
- T20I shirt no.: 77

Domestic team information
- Years: Team
- 2007/08–2025/26: New South Wales (squad no. 77)
- 2012: Yorkshire
- 2015/16–2025/26: Sydney Sixers (squad no. 77)
- 2018: Trailblazers
- 2019: Yorkshire Diamonds
- 2022–2023: Northern Superchargers
- 2023–2025: UP Warriorz

Career statistics
Competition	WTest	WODI	WT20I	WLA
Matches	10	126	162	243
Runs scored	489	3,777	3,054	7,233
Batting average	29.52	37.02	25.24	36.71
100s/50s	0/3	8/19	1/17	13/41
Top score	99	170	148*	170
Catches/stumpings	23/2	85/38	65/63	186/69
Medal record
Women's Cricket
Representing Australia
Commonwealth Games
Gold medal – first place	2022 Birmingham
Women's Cricket World Cup
Winner	2013 India
Winner	2022 New Zealand
ICC Women's T20 World Cup
Winner	2010 West Indies
Winner	2012 Sri Lanka
Winner	2014 Bangladesh
Runner-up	2016 India
Winner	2018 West Indies
Winner	2020 Australia
Winner	2023 South Africa
- Source: CricketArchive, 4 March 2026

Alyssa Jean Healy (born 24 March 1990) is an Australian former cricketer who played for and captained the Australian women's national team. She also played for New South Wales in domestic cricket, as well as the Sydney Sixers in the WBBL. She made her international debut in February 2010 and retired in March 2026.

A right-handed batter and wicket-keeper, Healy first came to prominence in late 2006 when she became the first girl to play among boys in the private schools' competition in New South Wales. She moved up the state age group ranks and made her debut for the senior New South Wales team in the 2007–08 season. She played most of her first two seasons as a specialist batter until the 2009–10 season, where she took up the glovework on a full-time basis for her state. During the same season, she recorded her highest score of 89 not out at faster than a run a ball, and made the most dismissals of any wicket-keeper in the Women's National Cricket League.

Making her international debut in the 2010 Rose Bowl series against New Zealand, Healy played 162 WT20I matches, the second most for any Australian woman, alongside playing 126 WODI matches. She currently holds the record for the most T20I dismissals as a wicket-keeper, male or female, having been involved in 126 dismissals over her career.

Healy was a member of Australia's squad for the 2018 Women's World Twenty20 and won player of the tournament alongside being the leading runs scorer, with 225 runs. She was named the ICC Women's T20I Cricketer of the Year in 2018 and 2019 alongside winning the Belinda Clark Award in 2019. Against Sri Lanka in 2019–20, she set an at-the-time record for the highest individual score in a Women's T20I match—148 not out. She was a member of the team during their seven-year WODI series win-streak and six year WT20I series win-streak, including their gold medal at the 2022 Commonwealth Games.

Following the retirement of Meg Lanning from international competition in November 2023, Healy became the captain of the Australian women's team in all three formats. She captained Australia in ODI and Test when they achieved a 16–0 whitewash against England at the 2024–25 Women's Ashes. She announced her retirement from professional cricket in 2026.

== Early and personal life ==
Born on the Gold Coast, Queensland, Healy is the daughter of Greg, who was a member of the Queensland squad, while Greg's younger brother Ian was Australia's Test wicket-keeper from the late 1980s until 1999 and was the world record holder for the most Test dismissals. Another uncle, Ken, played for Queensland. Despite the family heritage, and watching her uncle represent Australia, she said that she did not become interested in cricket until she moved from Queensland to Sydney as a child and was coaxed into taking up the sport by a friend. She attended high school at MLC School and later Barker College.

In 2015, Healy became engaged to fast bowler Mitchell Starc. They were married in April 2016. They met each other when they were both aged nine as Starc began as a wicketkeeper. Healy and Starc are only the third married couple to play Test cricket, after the English couple the Prideauxs (Roger and Ruth), in the 1950s to 1970, and the Sri Lankan de Alwis couple (Guy and Rasanjali), in the 1980s and 1990s. In March 2020, Starc flew home ahead of the final ODI match against South Africa, so he could watch Healy play in the final of the 2020 ICC Women's T20 World Cup. Healy's brother-in-law is high jumper Brandon Starc.

Healy's nickname is "Midge", given to her by her father when she was a child.

Healy has a golf handicap of seven (as of 1 Oct 2019) and competes against Starc (handicap of ten) for the annual Steally Cup. Healy and her husband support the Greater Western Sydney Giants in the Australian Football League. They were named joint number-one ticket holders in 2025.

== Youth career ==
Her selection at the age of 16 in late 2006 as wicket-keeper for Barker College First XI, the first time a girl had been picked to play among boys in the elite private schools' cricket competition in New South Wales, drew press commentary from various sources. This came about after an anonymous person, believed to be a former male student, circulated an email entitled "Save Barker Cricket Now" in the school community attacking the selection as a "disgrace" and calling for gender segregation of the cricket team. The sportsmaster of Barker College condemned the anonymous writer as "gutless" and maintained that Healy's selection was based on merit. Ian Healy and Alex Blackwell, a cricketer for the Australian women's team and former Barker student, also defended the selection and criticised the email author. The emailer was also criticised, and Alyssa Healy commended, by social commentators in newspapers. In 2010, she reflected "I'd do it all again...I really enjoyed playing school cricket with the boys and it definitely helped lift my skills and tighten my technique." Both she and Australian teammate Ellyse Perry have publicly advocated girls playing against boys.

In January 2007, Healy was selected in the New South Wales team to play in the Under-19 interstate competition. Opening the batting in all three matches and keeping in only the second of these, she scored 47, 73 and 41 in her first three matches, and took one catch. She went on to end with 345 runs at a batting average of 57.50, topping the run-scorers list and was named the best under-17 player at the tournament. The following month, she was selected in the Australia Youth team, composed of under-23 cricketers, to play against New Zealand A, the only player selected before making their senior domestic debut. She scored 10 not out, 41 and 63 in three matches, and made one stumping. Though she top-scored amongst the Australians in the final match with 63 from 84 balls, it was not enough to prevent a 22-run defeat. She played as a wicket-keeper batting in the middle-order in the first match, and opened in the last two matches, playing purely as a batter. The series ended 1–1 after the second match was tied.

== Domestic career ==
=== Women's National Cricket League ===
==== Senior domestic debut (2007/08–2008/09) ====
At the start of the 2007–08 season, she made her senior debut for the New South Wales Breakers in the Australian domestic one-day league. She was used as a specialist batter in the top-order, as Leonie Coleman, a wicket-keeper in the Australian squad, also played for New South Wales. She made her debut against South Australia and was unsuccessful to begin with, scoring only 24 runs in her first five innings. After one month at senior level, she broke through with a match-winning performance in her sixth senior game. After Queensland had made 170, Healy came in with the score at 5/99 after 32 overs, with 18 overs remaining. She raised the run rate, scoring 41 not out from 50 balls, with eight fours, shepherding the tail-enders and guiding her state to a two-wicket win with 17 balls to spare.

New South Wales reached the final and were awarded the title because they placed first in the qualifying matches after rain washed out the deciding game. Healy ended the season with 78 runs at 11.14. She also played in two Twenty20 interstate matches. She scored two and made a stumping in the first match, and neither batted nor kept wicket in the latter. New South Wales prevailed in both.

At the end of the season, she was selected for the Under-23 Australian team to play a series against the senior England and Australian teams. She scored 45, 1 and 41 not out in three matches. In the third match, she combined for a second-wicket partnership of 52 with Elyse Villani, hitting six boundaries in 62 balls and guiding her team to an eight-wicket win over the Australian team. Playing as a specialist batter, she also took three catches. The new 2008–09 season started the same way, with the Under-23 national team playing against Australia and India. The first match, against India, was washed out and Healy made a duck [zero] and 9 in the other matches. Playing as a batter, she did not take a catch.

Healy again played as a batter, with Coleman ensconced behind the stumps. In the first four matches of the new domestic season, she batted only once, scoring nine. In these matches she was placed in the lower-order and did not bowl. She was dropped after these four matches.

She then played six matches for the Second XI in the space of a week, mostly as a top-order batter, sometimes opening and as a wicket-keeper. New South Wales won all the fixtures except for one that was abandoned due to inclement weather. She scored 120 runs at 40.00, took six catches and made three stumpings, and was recalled to the senior team after one week in the second-string outfit. In her first three matches back, Healy was placed in the middle-order and not required to bat or keep wickets. In the last league match, she scored 59 from 55 balls in an 89-run partnership at faster than a run a ball with Lisa Sthalekar against Victoria. New South Wales won by three wickets despite losing Healy and three subsequent batters in the closing phase of the run-chase. In the final against the same team the following week, Healy made 11 from 22 balls before being run out, but New South Wales nevertheless won by six wickets with more than 15 overs to spare to claim the title. Healy ended the one-day competition with 79 runs at 26.33. She was named Australia's 30-strong shortlist for the 2009 Women's Cricket World Cup, but was not a part of the final squad of 15.

Healy also played in two Twenty20 matches for her state during the season, scoring 35 from 27 balls against South Australia and 16 from 21 balls against Victoria. She was New South Wales' second top-scorer in both matches; the first was won but the second lost.

==== Full-time wicket-keeper (2009/10) ====
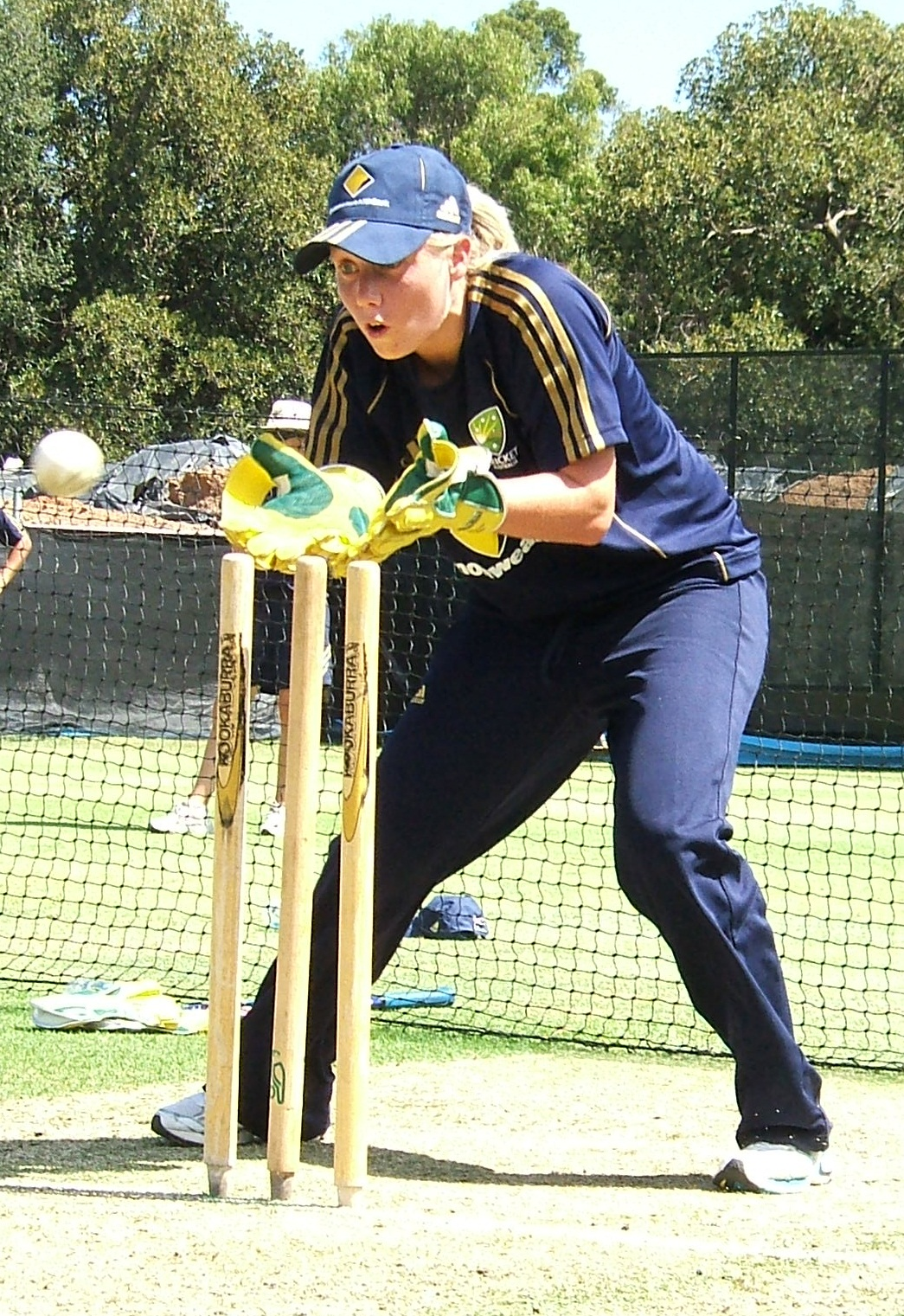
Healy practising a stumping in the Adelaide Oval nets.

After the Women's World Cup held in early 2009, Coleman transferred to play for the Australian Capital Territory, so Healy became New South Wales' wicket-keeper on a full-time basis for the start of the 2009–10 season. After making scores of 11, 12 and 29 in her first three innings of the one-day season, she struck an unbeaten 89 against Victoria. Coming in upon the fall of Leah Poulton with the score at 1/9 after three overs, she hit 13 fours in 82 balls, putting on partnerships of 72 with Blackwell and 82 with Sthalekar. New South Wales reached their target of 187 with more than 13 overs to spare and Healy was named the Player of the Match, having earlier taken a catch and made a stumping. Her season was interrupted by her selection in the Australian Under-21 team to play against the New Zealand Emerging Players. In five matches, she scored 50 runs at 10.00, took five catches and made one stumping as Australia won the series 4–1.

In the final of the one-day competition, she scored 23 from 37 balls batting at No. 3 and took two catches as New South Wales defeated Victoria by 59 runs. Healy ended her first full season as a wicket-keeper with 208 runs at 29.71, the second-highest average in her team behind Blackwell. In 11 matches, she also took 11 catches and completed 9 stumpings, effecting more dismissals than any other player.

She made 52 runs at 13.00 in seven T20 matches. Her best score was an unbeaten 20 from 13 balls in an eight-wicket win over Tasmania. In the final, Victoria batted first and made 5/127, Healy completing a catch and stumping. In reply, Healy made a duck as New South Wales lost four wickets in the first 13 balls and were all out for 75 to lose by 22 runs.

=== Women's Big Bash League ===
In November 2018, she was named in the Sydney Sixers' squad for the 2018–19 Women's Big Bash League season. In April 2019, Cricket Australia awarded her with a contract ahead of the 2019–20 season.

== International career ==
=== International debut (2010) ===
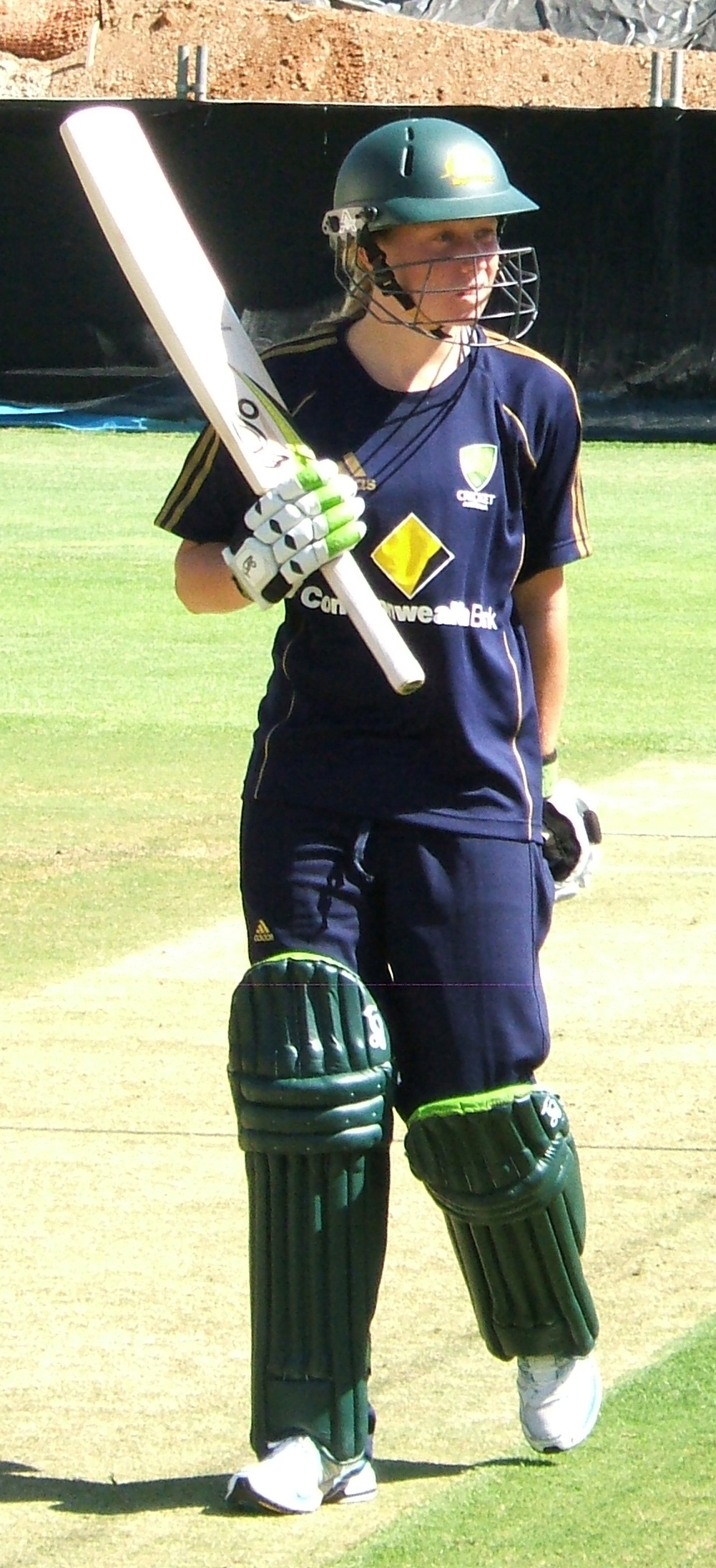
Healy in her batting kit in the Adelaide Oval nets

Healy was selected in the Australian squad for the Rose Bowl series against New Zealand in February 2010 due to an injury to the incumbent wicketkeeper and captain Jodie Fields. The selection committee released a statement saying "Alyssa has been identified for higher honours for a number of years and now gets the chance to display her wicket-keeping skills and attacking batting on the international stage". Healy made her ODI debut at the Adelaide Oval and played in all five ODIs in the Australian leg of the series. In her first match, she scored 21 from 11 balls in the death overs, hitting four fours as Australia made 241 before bowling out the visitors for 126 to seal a 115-run win. She took one catch, removing Amy Satterthwaite from the bowling of Rene Farrell. Healy made consecutive ducks in the next two matches, and made four in the final match at Junction Oval. She had only brief opportunities with the bat in the closing stages of the innings. She ended the series with 25 runs at 6.25 and a strike rate of 100.00, five catches and a stumping.

She then played in the three T20s held at Bellerive Oval in Hobart. The first of these matches was a curtain-raiser to the match between the Australia and West Indies men teams, and was the first match to be shown live on free-to-air television in Australia. New Zealand batted first and Australian fast bowler Ellyse Perry extracted an outside edge from captain Aimee Watkins from the first ball of the match. The ball flew straight to Healy's mid-riff and she dropped it. Watkins went on to score 44 from 36 balls as New Zealand made 7/117 and Healy's only dismissal was to catch Nicola Browne from Sthalekar's off spin. Healy came to the crease at 6/107 at the end of the 19th over and had scored three runs from as many balls and found herself on strike for the final ball of the match, bowled by Browne, with Australia needing three runs for the win. The delivery was wide outside off and Healy's expansive shot took the outside edge of the bat and flew towards the vacant first slip area. It would have gone for a match-winning four runs but for New Zealand wicket-keeper Rachel Priest diving across and catching the ball one-handed in her right glove, handing the tourists a two-run victory.

Healy had little impact with the bat in the three T20s in Australia and two more at the start of the New Zealand leg of the series, scoring 17 runs at 5.66 and a strike rate of 77.27. Apart from one catch on her debut, she did not make any more dismissals. Australia lost all five matches. She was then omitted for the three ODIs in New Zealand as batter Jess Cameron stood in as a makeshift wicket-keeper.

=== 2010 World Twenty20 ===
Healy was selected for the 2010 World Twenty20 in the West Indies and played in every match after Fields was again forced out by injury. In the first warm-up match, she took two catches and did not bat as Australia lost to New Zealand by 18 runs. In the last warm-up match, she was again not required to bat and did not make a dismissal as the Australians defeated Pakistan by 82 runs.

Australia were grouped with England, South Africa and the West Indies. In the first match against England, Healy took one catch to dismiss Danielle Hazell from the bowling of Sthalekar. In pursuit of 105 for victory, Australia were struggling when Healy came to the crease with the score at 7/63 after 14.2 overs. Three wickets had fallen in the space of 16 balls, during which only three runs had been added, and England had the momentum, and 42 runs were needed from 34 balls for victory. Healy then struck three fours, making 15 from 9 balls before being dismissed by Nicki Shaw, ending a stand of 23 from 13 balls with Sthalekar. However, Rene Farrell was run out going for the winning run from the third last ball available, leaving the scores tied.

A Super Over eventuated, and Laura Marsh bowled for England. Healy came in at 1/3 after Leah Poulton fell on the fourth ball. She hit a two from the fifth ball, and was run out by Jenny Gunn while attempting to complete a second run on the sixth and final ball of Australia's Super Over, leaving them at 2/6. England also ended with 2/6 after a run out in an attempt to secure the winning run on the final ball. Australia was awarded the match because they had hit more sixes in the match—Jess Cameron scored the solitary six.

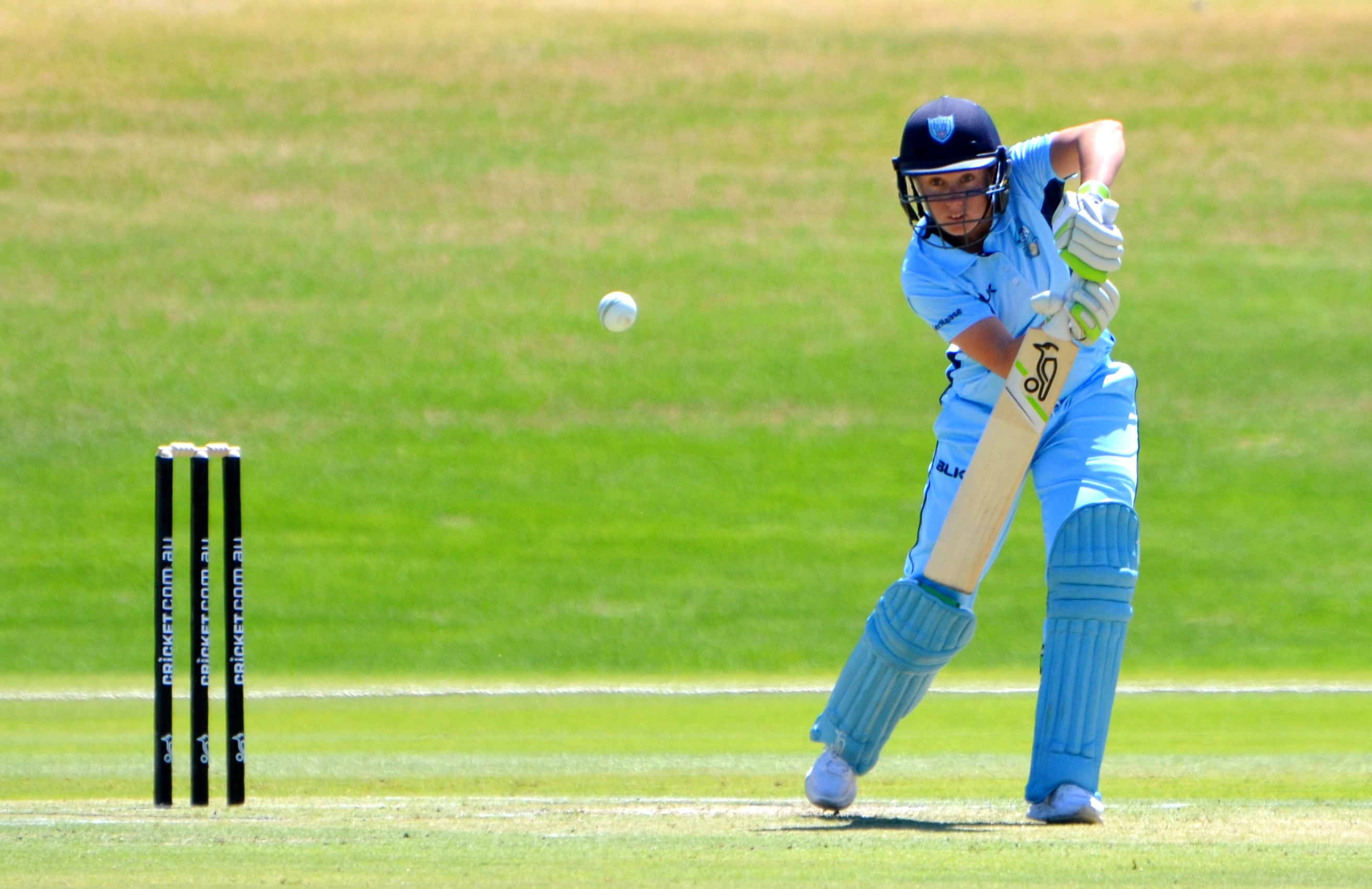
Healy batting for NSW Breakers, 2017

In the next match against South Africa, Healy was promoted two positions to No. 7. Coming in upon the fall of Cameron, her partner Sarah Elliott was then run out without further addition to the score. Healy hit one boundary and was then out for 8 from 6 balls at 7/151. Her dismissal was part of a sudden collapse as Australia lost 6/16 including the last four wickets for four runs to be all out for 155 with three balls unused. Healy did not make a dismissal as Australia completed a 22-run win. In the final group match against the West Indies, Healy came in at 6/111 and hit 12 from 8 balls, before being caught from the final ball of the innings as Australia finished on 7/133. She had put on 22 runs in 16 balls with Sthalekar. She caught Deandra Dottin from the bowling of Perry for a golden duck as Australia won by nine runs to finish the group stage unbeaten at the top of their quartet.

Australia went on to face India in the semi-final. Healy stumped leading Indian batter Mithali Raj from the bowling of Sthalekar and was not required to bat as Australia reached their target of 120 with seven wickets and seven balls to spare. Australia elected to bat first in the final against New Zealand, but the top-order struggled and Healy came to the crease to join Elliott at 5/51 in the 13th over after the fall of two wickets in quick succession. The pair lifted the run rate by adding 21 runs in 18 balls. Healy scored 10 from as many balls, but was then run out attempting a second run after being dropped by Sara McGlashan in the outfield. This left the score at 6/72 in the 16th over, and Australia eventually ended on 8/106.

During the middle of the run-chase, Priest was incorrectly given out stumped by Healy after the television umpire Asad Rauf had pressed the wrong button, and he had to retract his decision. Soon after New Zealand were at 5/36 after 11 overs, leaving them with 71 runs to score from the last 54 balls, and Australia were in the ascendancy. However, New Zealand's chances were revived by Nicola Browne and Sophie Devine, who put on 41 from as many balls. In the 18th over, Healy caught Browne from Perry's bowling, and Australia went on to win by three runs after New Zealand ended on 6/103.

=== 2015–2023 ===
In June 2015, she was named as one of Australia's touring party for the 2015 Women's Ashes in England.

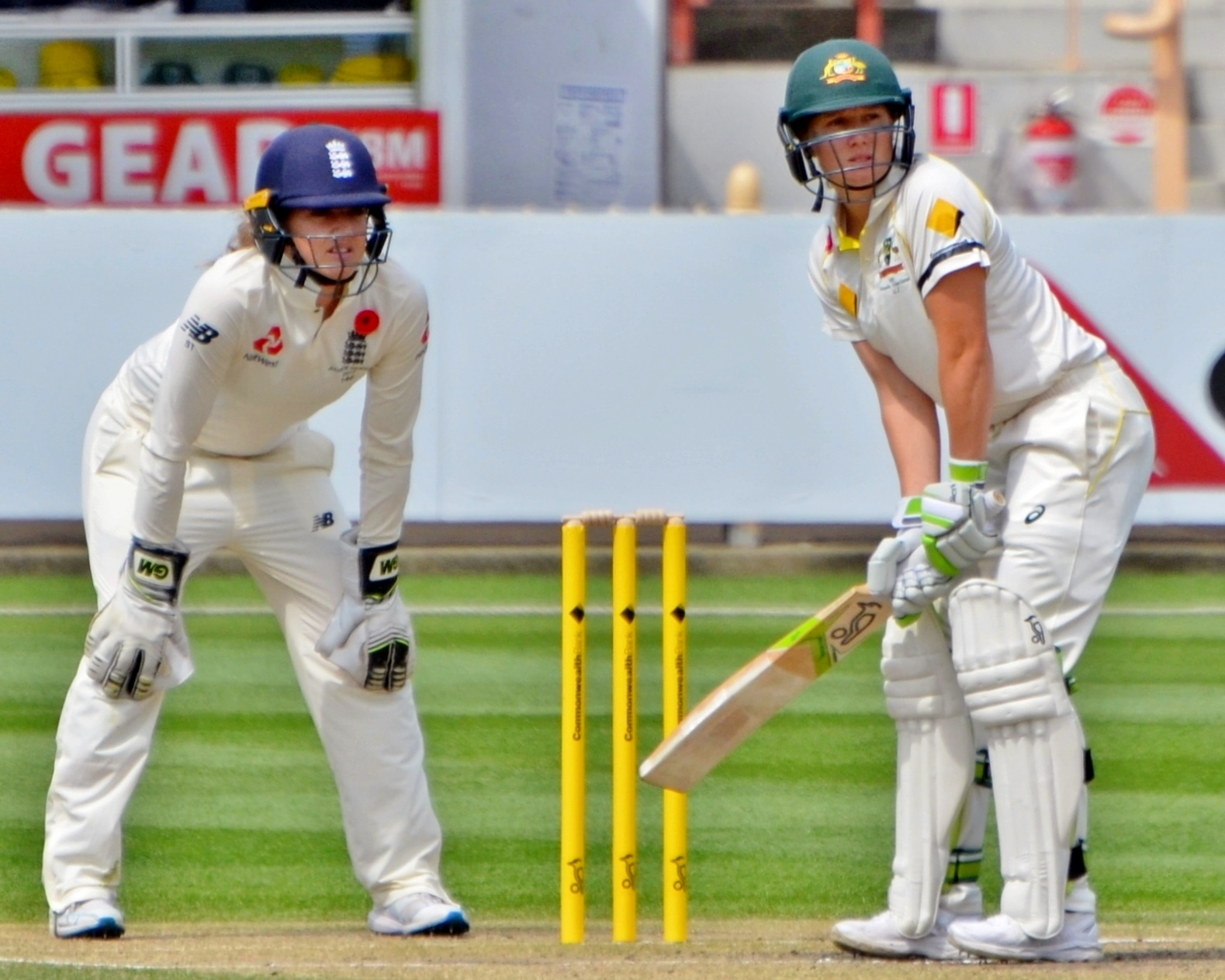
Healy (right) batting during the 2017 Women's Ashes series

Healy was named as the wicketkeeper across all forms of the 2017 Women's Ashes series in Australia. She was the leading run-scorer in the ODI leg of the series. The entire series ended 8–8 in points, and as the holders, Australia retained the Ashes.

In April 2018, she was one of the fourteen players to be awarded a national contract for the 2018–19 season by Cricket Australia.

In October 2018, she was named in Australia's squad for the 2018 ICC Women's World Twenty20 tournament in the West Indies. Ahead of the tournament, she was named as one of the players to watch. She was the leading run-scorer in the competition, with 225 runs, and was named the player of the tournament.

In June 2019, Cricket Australia named her in Australia's team for their tour to England to contest the Women's Ashes. That same year, she played her 100th WT20I match during Australia's series against Sri Lanka.

She was awarded the Belinda Clarke Medal at the Allan Border Medal ceremony by the CA in 2019. In January 2020, she was named in Australia's squad for the 2020 ICC Women's T20 World Cup in Australia. In Australia's match against Bangladesh, Healy and Beth Mooney made an opening partnership of 151 runs, the highest partnership for Australia Women for any wicket in a WT20I match. In the final, Healy blasted 75 off 39 balls in a player of the match performance, which saw Australia win their 5th title.

In November 2020, Healy was nominated for the ICC Women's T20I Cricketer of the Decade award. On 7 April 2021, in the second WODI against New Zealand, Healy played in her 200th international match.

In January 2022, Healy was named in Australia's squad for their series against England to contest the Women's Ashes. Later the same month, she was named in Australia's team for the 2022 Women's Cricket World Cup in New Zealand. In April 2022, she was bought by the Northern Superchargers for the 2022 season of The Hundred in England. The following month, Healy was named in Australia's team for the cricket tournament at the 2022 Commonwealth Games in Birmingham, England.

=== Australian captaincy (2023–2026) ===
In December 2023, after the retirement of Meg Lanning from international cricket, Healy was appointed as captain of the Australia women's national cricket team in test, one day international and Twenty20 International cricket.

She was named captain of the Australia squad for the 2024 ICC Women's T20 World Cup and the 2024–25 Women's Ashes series. During the latter series, injury prevented her from playing the T20I matches, as well as preventing her from wicket-keeping the Test match. She, alongside Tahlia McGrath, captained Australia to a 16–0 points whitewash, winning all of the matches played.

In January 2026 Healy announced her impending retirement from all formats of cricket, with her final appearances for Australia happening against the Indian Women's team in February and March 2026. During her last ODI match, she scored 158 off 98 balls, winning player of the match. In the same ODI match, she bowled her first overs in International Cricket, bowling two overs, with 12 runs conceded at an economy of 6.00. In her final match, she captained a 10 wicket Test win over the Indian team.

== Records and achievements ==
Between 21 February and 2 August 2019, Healy held the Guinness World Record for the highest catch of a cricket ball at 82.5m. This was set as part of a campaign to mark one year until the start of the 2020 ICC Women's T20 World Cup. However, the record has since been surpassed by Kristan Baumgartner, with 114m. She broke the world record for the most runs in a Women's T20 International with 148* (61) at North Sydney Oval on 2 October 2019 against Sri Lanka (later surpassed). On 8 March 2020, Healy recorded the fastest 50 (off 30 balls) in the history of ICC event finals across formats before it was broken by Heinrich Klaasen in 2024.

In September 2020, in the second WT20I match against New Zealand, Healy took her 92nd dismissal as a wicket-keeper, passing MS Dhoni to set a new record of most dismissals as a wicket-keeper, male or female, in Twenty20 International cricket.

=== International centuries ===
One Day International centuries
Runs	Match	Opponents	City	Venue	Year
133	58	India	Vadodara, India	Reliance Stadium	2018
122	68	West Indies	Saint George, Antigua and Barbuda	Coolidge Cricket Ground	2019
112*	73	Sri Lanka	Brisbane, Australia	Allan Border Field	2019
129	93	West Indies	Wellington, New Zealand	Basin Reserve	2022
170	94	England	Christchurch, New Zealand	Hagley Oval	2022
142	121	India	Visakhapatnam, India	ACA–VDCA Cricket Stadium	2025
113*	122	Bangladesh	Visakhapatnam, India	ACA–VDCA Cricket Stadium	2025
158	126	India	Hobart, Australia	Bellerive Oval	2026

T20 International centuries
Runs	Match	Opponents	City	Venue	Year
148*	101	Sri Lanka	Sydney, Australia	North Sydney Oval	2019

== Honours ==
=== Team ===
==== International ====
- ICC Women's World Twenty20/T20 World Cup: 2010, 2012, 2014, 2018, 2020, 2023
- ICC Women's Cricket World Cup: 2013, (Note: Healy was named in the Australian squad for the tournament, but did not play a match.) 2022

==== Domestic/franchise ====
- Women's Big Bash League: WBBL|02, WBBL|03
- Women's National Cricket League: 2007–08, 2008–09, 2009–10, 2010–11, 2011–12, 2012–13, 2013–14, 2014–15, 2016–17, 2017–18, 2018–19

=== Individual ===
- ICC Women's T20I Cricketer of the Year: 2018, 2019
- Belinda Clark Award: 2019
- Cricket Australia Women's ODI Player of the Year: 2019
- ICC Women's Player of the Month: April 2021
- WBBL Team of the Tournament: WBBL|04
