= Australia women's cricket team in New Zealand in 2007–08 =

	New Zealand	Australia
- Dates: 6 – 16 March 2008
Captains	Haidee Tiffen	Karen Rolton

One Day International series
- Results: Australia won the 5-match series 3–2
Most runs	Nicola Browne (178)	Alex Blackwell (211)
Most wickets	Sophie Devine (7)	Emma Sampson (9)
- Player of the series: Emma Sampson (Aus)

Twenty20 International series
- Results: New Zealand won the 1-match series 1–0
Most runs	Sara McGlashan (25)	Alex Blackwell (15)
Most wickets	Sarah Burke (3)	Shelley Nitschke (2)

The Australia women's national cricket team toured New Zealand in March 2008. They first played against New Zealand in one Twenty20 International, which they lost by 4 wickets. The two sides then played in five One Day Internationals, which were competed for the Rose Bowl. Australia won the series 3–2.

== Squads ==
New Zealand	Australia
Haidee Tiffen (c); Nicola Browne; Sarah Burke; Rachel Candy; Sophie Devine; Lucy Doolan; Katey Martin; Sara McGlashan; Rachel Priest (wk); Amy Satterthwaite; Sarah Tsukigawa; Aimee Watkins; Helen Watson	Karen Rolton (c); Sarah Andrews; Alex Blackwell; Kate Blackwell; Renee Chappell; Leonie Coleman (wk); Sarah Elliott; Jodie Fields; Delissa Kimmince; Shelley Nitschke; Ellyse Perry; Kirsten Pike; Emma Sampson; Lisa Sthalekar

== Only WT20I ==
6 March 2008
Scorecard

Australia; 80/9 (20 overs)	v	New Zealand; 81/6 (71.1 overs)
Alex Blackwell 15 (28); Sarah Burke 3/15 (4 overs)		Sara McGlashan 25 (21); Shelley Nitschke 2/17 (4 overs)

New Zealand Women won by 4 wickets
Bert Sutcliffe Oval, Lincoln
Umpires: Dave Paterson (NZ) and Mike George (NZ)

- New Zealand Women won the toss and elected to field.
- Lucy Doolan and Katey Martin (NZ) both made their WT20I debuts.

== WODI Series ==
=== 1st ODI ===
8 March 2008
Scorecard

Australia; 189/5 (50 overs)	v	New Zealand; 126 (41.1 overs)
Alex Blackwell 44 (100); Lucy Doolan 2/36 (10 overs)		Haidee Tiffen 37* (75); Kirsten Pike 2/21 (8 overs)

Australia Women won by 63 runs
Bert Sutcliffe Oval, Lincoln
Umpires: Gary Baxter (NZ) and Robert Anderson (NZ)

- Australia Women won the toss and elected to bat.

=== 2nd ODI ===
9 March 2008
Scorecard

New Zealand; 238/7 (50 overs)	v	Australia; 156 (44.3 overs)
Amy Satterthwaite 48 (64); Sarah Andrews 2/42 (9 overs)		Jodie Fields 56 (96); Lucy Doolan 3/42 (9.3 overs)

New Zealand Women won by 82 runs
Bert Sutcliffe Oval, Lincoln
Umpires: Gary Baxter (NZ) and Robert Anderson (NZ)

- New Zealand Women won the toss and elected to bat.

=== 3rd ODI ===
12 March 2008
Scorecard

Australia; 170 (49.5 overs)	v	New Zealand; 171/5 (42.1 overs)
Ellyse Perry 51 (99); Sophie Devine 2/33 (9.5 overs)		Nicola Browne 59* (93); Kirsten Pike 2/31 (6 overs)

New Zealand Women won by 5 wickets
Bert Sutcliffe Oval, Lincoln
Umpires: Barry Frost (NZ) and Derek Walker (NZ)

- Australia Women won the toss and elected to bat.

=== 4th ODI ===
15 March 2008
Scorecard

Australia; 211/6 (50 overs)	v	New Zealand; 205 (49.4 overs)
Lisa Sthalekar 69 (81); Sophie Devine 2/35 (10 overs)		Haidee Tiffen 41 (83); Emma Sampson 5/30 (10 overs)

Australia Women won by 6 runs
Bert Sutcliffe Oval, Lincoln
Umpires: Tony Hill (NZ) and Wayne Knights (NZ)

- Australia Women won the toss and elected to bat.
- Delissa Kimmince (Aus) made her WODI debut.

=== 5th ODI ===
16 March 2008
Scorecard

New Zealand; 249/7 (50 overs)	v	Australia; 250/2 (46.5 overs)
Nicola Browne 50 (43); Sarah Andrews 3/45 (9 overs)		Alex Blackwell 91 (132); Lucy Doolan 1/37 (8 overs)

Australia Women won by 8 wickets
Bert Sutcliffe Oval, Lincoln
Umpires: Tony Hill (NZ) and Wayne Knights (NZ)

- New Zealand Women won the toss and elected to bat.
