= Donna Brown =

Donna Brown may refer to:

- Donna Brown (basketball) (born 1963), Australian basketball player
- Donna Brown (cricketer) (born 1982), Australian cricketer
- Donna Brown (soprano) (born 1955), Canadian soprano opera singer
- Donna Brown, née Donna Tubbs, fictional character on The Cleveland Show
- Donna Brown (Neighbours), née Freedman, fictional character from the Australian TV series Neighbours
