= 2007–08 Women's National Cricket League season =

Cricket tournament

Women's National Cricket League 2007–08 season
- Dates: 17 November 2007 – 19 January 2008
- Administrator: Cricket Australia
- Cricket format: Limited overs cricket (50 overs)
- Tournament format(s): Group stage and final
- Champions: New South Wales (10th title)
- Runners-up: South Australia
- Participants: 5
- Matches: 21
- Player of the series: (New South Wales) Lisa Sthalekar
- Most runs: (South Australia) Karen Rolton (384)
- Most wickets: (Western Australia) Renee Chappell (14)
- Official website: cricket.com.au

The 2007–08 Women's National Cricket League season was the 12th season of the Women's National Cricket League, the women's domestic limited overs cricket competition in Australia. The tournament started on 17 November 2007 and finished on 19 January 2008. The final between defending champions New South Wales Breakers and South Australian Scorpions was washed out, and as such the Breakers won the tournament for the 10th time by virtue of topping the ladder at the conclusion of the group stage.

== Ladder ==
As of 13 January 2008

Pos	Team	Pld	W	L	T	NR	BP	Pts	NRR
1	New South Wales	8	7	1	0	0	1.5	29.5	0.438
2	South Australia	8	4	4	0	0	5	21	0.546
3	Western Australia	8	3	5	0	0	2	14	−0.194
4	Victoria	8	3	5	0	0	2	14	−0.224
5	Queensland	8	3	5	0	0	0	12	−0.535

Updated to match(es) played on 13 January 2008. Source:
Rules for classification: The top two ranked teams qualified for the final.
- Points system: 4 for a win, 2 each for a tie or a no result, 0 for a loss, 1 each for an abandoned match.
- Bonus point system: 2 for win with a run rate twice that of the opposition, 1 for win with a run rate 1.25 times that of the opposition.

== Fixtures ==
=== Final ===
19 January 2008
Scorecard

New South Wales	v	South Australia

Match abandoned
Sydney Cricket Ground
Umpires: David Dilley and Bill Hendricks

- No toss.
- No play was possible due to rain.
- New South Wales won the 2007–08 Women's National Cricket League after topping the ladder at the conclusion of the group stage.

== Statistics ==
=== Highest totals ===
Team	Score	Against	Venue	Date
South Australia	6/261	Victoria	Adelaide Oval	11 January 2008
Victoria	4/239	Western Australia	WACA Ground	24 November 2007
New South Wales	7/231	Western Australia	Aquinas College, Perth	4 January 2008
New South Wales	8/228	Victoria	Melbourne Cricket Ground	9 December 2007
Western Australia	227	Queensland	The Gabba	11 January 2008

=== Most runs ===
Player	Team	Mat	Inns	NO	Runs	HS	Ave	BF	SR	100	50
Karen Rolton	South Australia	8	8	1	384	106*	54.85	504	76.19	1	4
Lisa Sthalekar	New South Wales	8	8	1	312	93*	44.57	382	81.67	0	3
Alex Blackwell	New South Wales	8	8	1	293	75*	41.85	482	60.78	0	4
Mel Jones	Victoria	8	8	0	285	73	35.62	485	58.76	0	2
Shelley Nitschke	South Australia	8	8	0	250	74	31.25	335	74.62	0	2

=== Most wickets ===
Player	Team	Mat	Inns	Overs	Mdns	Runs	Wkts	BBI	Ave	SR	4WI
Renee Chappell	Western Australia	8	8	59.0	7	194	14	4/15	13.85	25.2	1
Clea Smith	Victoria	8	8	72.5	16	261	13	5/10	20.07	33.6	0
Kirsten Pike	Queensland	8	8	74.5	16	276	13	4/33	21.23	34.5	1
Lisa Sthalekar	New South Wales	8	8	64.0	11	175	12	3/20	14.58	32.0	0
Emma Sampson	South Australia	8	8	61.3	12	221	12	4/27	18.41	30.7	1
