= 2020 Women's T20 World Cup final =

Cricket match

2020 ICC Women's T20 World Cup Final
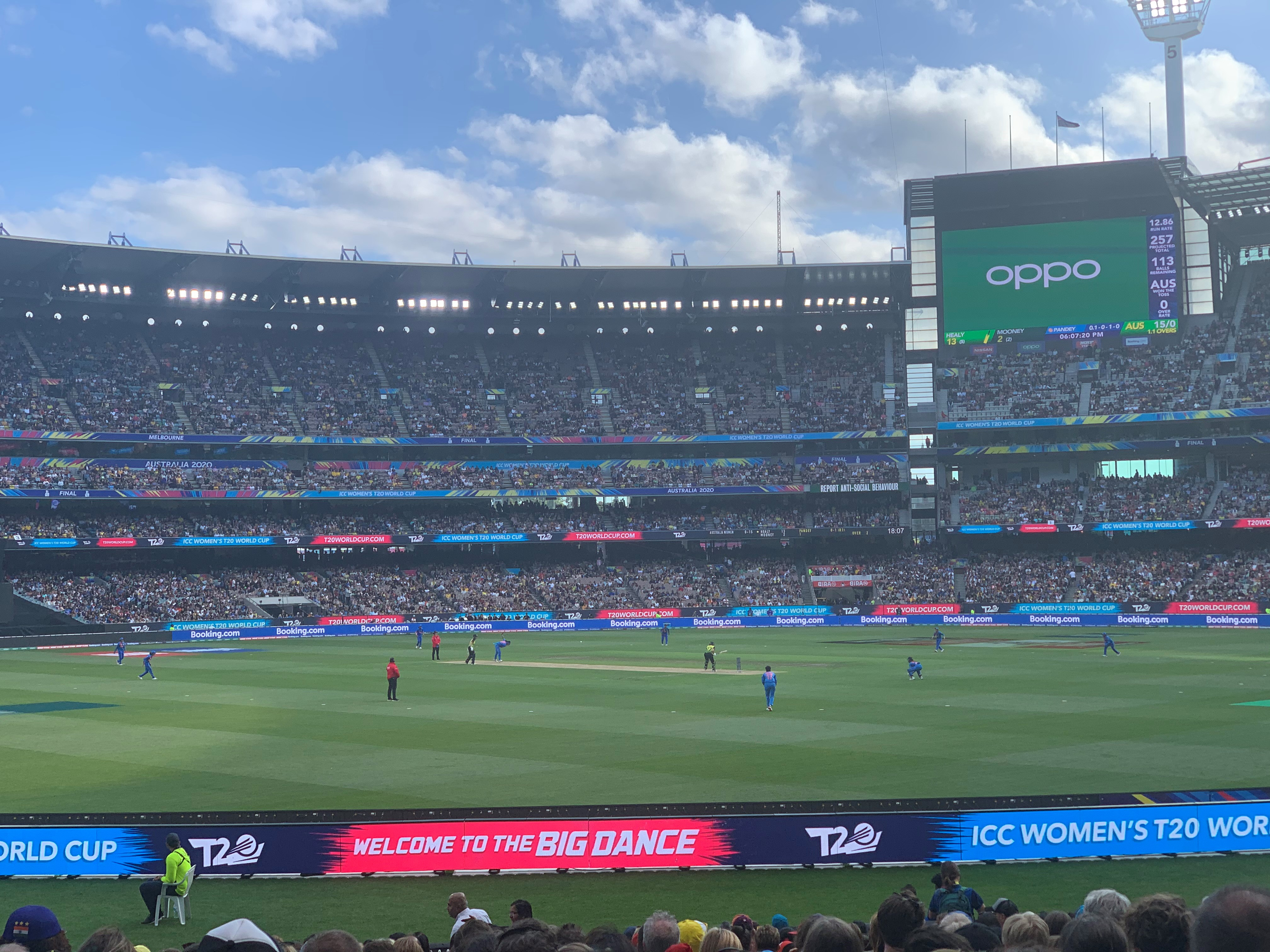
- Melbourne Cricket Ground during the match
- Event: 2020 ICC Women's T20 World Cup
Australia	India
(Australia)	(India)
184/4	99
20 overs	19.1 overs
- Australia won by 85 runs
- Date: 8 March 2020
- Venue: Melbourne Cricket Ground, Melbourne
- Player of the match: Alyssa Healy (Aus)
- Umpires: Kim Cotton (NZ); Ahsan Raza (Pak)
- Attendance: 86,174

The 2020 ICC Women's T20 World Cup Final was a day/night Women's Twenty20 International cricket match played on 8 March 2020 between Australia and India at the Melbourne Cricket Ground in Melbourne. It was the culmination of the 2020 ICC Women's T20 World Cup, the seventh of the tournament history since it started in 2009. Australia won the match by 85 runs, securing their fifth T20 World Cup title. This was the first time that India had reached the final.

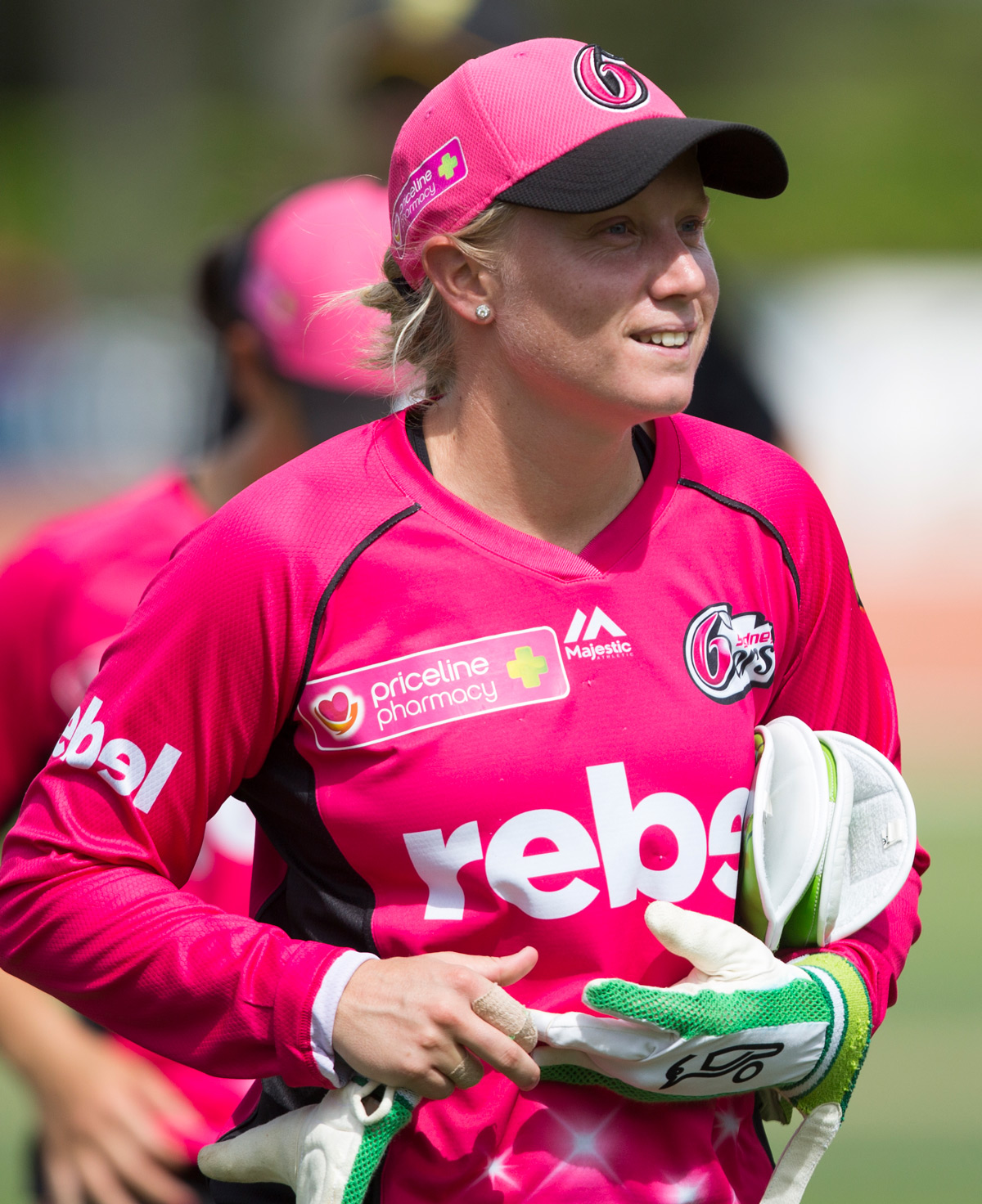
Alyssa Healy was player of the match for her 75 runs & in this match she reached 2,000th run in WT20Is.

After winning the toss, Australian captain Meg Lanning elected to bat first. Her side posted 184 runs for the loss of four wickets from 20 overs. Beth Mooney top scored for Australia with 78 not out with her opening partner Alyssa Healy setting up the innings with 75 from 39 balls. Deepti Sharma took two wickets for India, while Poonam Yadav and Radha Yadav took one apiece. In reply, Australia found early wickets, restricting India to 4/30 after the six-over powerplay. All-rounder Sharma showed some resistance to Australia's attack, managing 33 from 25; however, the final four wickets fell for 7 runs off 13 balls, with India all out in 19.1 overs for 99 runs. Megan Schutt led the Australian bowlers with four wickets, followed by Jess Jonassen with three. Healy was named the player of the match, and Mooney was named player of the tournament.

== Background ==
The 2020 ICC Women's T20 World Cup started on 21 February and was hosted by Australia. The ten teams that qualified for the tournament were split into two pools and played each other once in a round-robin format. The top two teams from each pool advanced to the semi-finals. Both semi-final matches were scheduled to be played at the Sydney Cricket Ground on 5 March 2020. India, who finished the first in Pool A, were the first to make the final with their match against England being abandoned due to rain. A rain-affected second-semi final saw hosts Australia narrowly defeat South Africa by five runs.

This was Australia's sixth consecutive Women's T20 World Cup finals appearance, dating back to 2010 and they were seeking to become the first host team to be crowned champions since England in 2009.

In November 2019, it was announced that Katy Perry would perform both before and after the match. Perry performed two songs before the match, "Roar" and "Firework".

== Roads to the final ==
=== Route to the final ===
Australia		Round	India
Opponent	Result	Group stage	Opponent	Result
India	India Women won by 17 runs	Match 1	Australia	India Women won by 17 runs
Sri Lanka	Australia Women won by 5 wickets	Match 2	Bangladesh	India Women won by 18 runs
Bangladesh	Australia Women won by 86 runs	Match 3	New Zealand	India Women won by 3 runs
New Zealand	Australia Women won by 4 runs	Match 4	Sri Lanka	India Women won by 7 wickets
Group A 2nd Place: Pos / Team / P / W / L / T / NR / Pts / NRR / Qualification; 2 / Australia / 4 / 3 / 1 / 0 / 0 / 6 / +0.971 / Advance to semi-finals		Final group standings	Group A 1st Place: Pos / Team / P / W / L / T / NR / Pts / NRR / Qualification; 1 / India / 4 / 4 / 0 / 0 / 0 / 8 / +0.979 / Advance to semi-finals
Opponent	Result	Knockout stage	Opponent	Result
South Africa	Australia Women won by 5 runs (DLS method)	Semifinals	England	Match abandoned, India Women advance to final

=== Group stage ===
On 21 February, Indian women's team beat defending champions Australia by 17 runs in the first match of the ICC Women's T20 World Cup played at the Sydney ground. Batting first, Indian team scored 132 runs in the loss of four wickets in 20 overs. The team of Australia could score 115 runs in 19.5 overs. For the host team, Alyssa Healy scored an innings of 51 runs with the help of six fours and a six off 35 balls. India Leg-spinner Poonam Yadav took four wickets for 19 runs in four overs.

On 24 February, Indian team winning campaign continues in the Women's T20 World Cup. Indian team defeated Bangladesh by 18 runs in their second match. With this win, they was reached the top in Group A. Bangladesh captain Salma Khatun won the toss & chose bowling for her team. Batting first, India scored 142 in the loss of 6 wickets in 20 overs. Chasing the target, Bangladesh were able to score 124 runs for 8 wickets in 20 overs. Shafali Verma was adjudged Player of the Match. For India, Poonam Yadav took 3 wickets for 18 runs. Apart from her, Arundhati Reddy took 2 for 33, Shikha Pandey 2 for 14 and Rajeshwari Gayakwad took one wicket for 25 runs.

On 27 February, Team India had reached the semi-finals of the World Cup after defeating New Zealand by 3 runs. With this, Team India reached the semi-finals of the World Cup for the fourth time. Earlier, India had reached to the semi-finals in 2009, 2010 and 2018. Chasing the target of 134 runs, the Kiwi team was able to score 130 runs in the loss of 6 wickets in 20 overs. For India opener Shafali Verma scored a blistering 46 runs, her outstanding performance of 16-year-old Shefali won the Player of the Match award for the second time in a row. Indian team scored 133 runs in 20 overs after losing the toss against New Zealand.

== Match ==
=== Match officials ===
On 6 March 2020, the International Cricket Council (ICC) named New Zealand's Kim Cotton and Pakistan's Ahsan Raza as the on-field umpires, with West Indian Gregory Brathwaite as the third umpire, Zimbabwe's Langton Rusere as the reserve umpire, and Chris Broad of England named as match referee.

=== Teams ===
Both teams were unchanged from their previous matches in the tournament.

=== Australia innings ===
The opening pairing of Alyssa Healy and Beth Mooney put on a century partnership of 115 runs before Healy was dismissed for 75. Both opening batters were dropped early in the innings. Indian youngster Shafali Verma dropped Alyssa Healy in the very first over of Australia's innings. Deepti Sharma struck in the 17th over, taking the wickets of skipper Meg Lanning for 16 and Ashleigh Gardner for 2. Rachael Haynes could only manage four runs before being dismissed in the 18th over. Mooney and Nicola Carey remained not out, moving Australia's total to 184 for 4. Mooney top-scored the innings with 78 runs, and with an overall World Cup total of 259 runs, she set the record for the most runs scored in a Women's T20 World Cup.

=== India innings ===
Pursuing a tremendous total of 185 runs, India got off to a bad start and lost four wickets inside the powerplay overs. India would never recuperate from the early blows and were bowled out for 99 runs in 19.1 overs.

=== Match details ===
8 March 2020
18:00 (D/N)
Scorecard

Australia; 184/4 (20 overs)	v	India; 99 (19.1 overs)
Beth Mooney 78* (54); Deepti Sharma 2/38 (4 overs)		Deepti Sharma 33 (35); Megan Schutt 4/18 (3.1 overs)

Australia Women won by 85 runs
Melbourne Cricket Ground, Melbourne
Umpires: Kim Cotton (NZ) and Ahsan Raza (Pak)
Player of the match: Alyssa Healy (Aus)

- Australia Women won the toss and elected to bat.
- Alyssa Healy (Aus) scored her 2,000th run in WT20Is.
- Richa Ghosh (Ind) replaced Taniya Bhatia as a concussion substitute after 10.1 overs of India's innings.
Final scorecard
- Toss: Australia won the toss and elected to bat first.
- Result: Australia won by 85 runs.

Australia batting innings
Batsman	Method of dismissal	Runs	Balls	Strike rate
Alyssa Healy †	c Krishnamurthy b Yadav	75	39	192.31
Beth Mooney	not out	78	54	144.44
Meg Lanning *	c Pandey b Sharma	16	15	106.67
Ashleigh Gardner	st Bhatia b Sharma	2	3	66.67
Rachael Haynes	b Yadav	4	5	80.00
Nicola Carey	not out	5	5	100.00
Sophie Molineux	did not bat			
Jess Jonassen	did not bat			
Georgia Wareham	did not bat			
Delissa Kimmince	did not bat			
Megan Schutt	did not bat			
Extras	(1 bye, 1 No Ball, 2 wides)	4		
Totals	(20 overs)	184		

India bowling
Bowler	Overs	Maidens	Runs	Wickets	Economy
Deepti Sharma	4	0	38	2	9.50
Shikha Pandey	4	0	52	0	13.00
Rajeshwari Gayakwad	4	0	29	0	7.25
Poonam Yadav	4	0	30	1	7.50
Radha Yadav	4	0	34	1	8.50

India batting innings
Batsman	Method of dismissal	Runs	Balls	Strike rate
Shafali Verma	c Healy b Schutt	2	3	66.67
Smriti Mandhana	c Carey b Molineux	11	8	137.50
Taniya Bhatia †	Retired Hurt	2	4	50.00
Jemimah Rodrigues	c Carey b Jonassen	0	2	0.00
Harmanpreet Kaur *	c Gardner b Jonassen	4	7	57.14
Deepti Sharma	c Mooney b Carey	33	35	94.29
Veda Krishnamurthy	c Jonassen b Kimmince	19	24	79.17
Richa Ghosh	c Carey b Schutt	18	18	100.00
Shikha Pandey	c Mooney b Schutt	1	4	25.00
Radha Yadav	c Mooney b Jonassen	1	2	50.00
Poonam Yadav	c Gardner b Schutt	1	5	20.00
Rajeshwari Gayakwad	not out	1	3	33.33
Extras	(0 bye, 0 No Ball, 0 wides)	0		
Totals	(19.1 overs)	99		

Australia bowling
Bowler	Overs	Maidens	Runs	Wickets	Economy
Megan Schutt	3.1	0	18	4	5.68
Jess Jonassen	4	0	20	3	5.00
Sophie Molineux	4	0	21	1	5.25
Delissa Kimmince	4	0	17	1	4.25
Nicola Carey	4	0	22	1	5.75

Key

- * – Captain
- † – Wicket-keeper
- c Fielder – Indicates that the batsman was dismissed by a catch by the named fielder
- b Bowler – Indicates which bowler gains credit for the dismissal
- lbw – Indicates the batsman was dismissed leg before wicket

== Attendance record ==
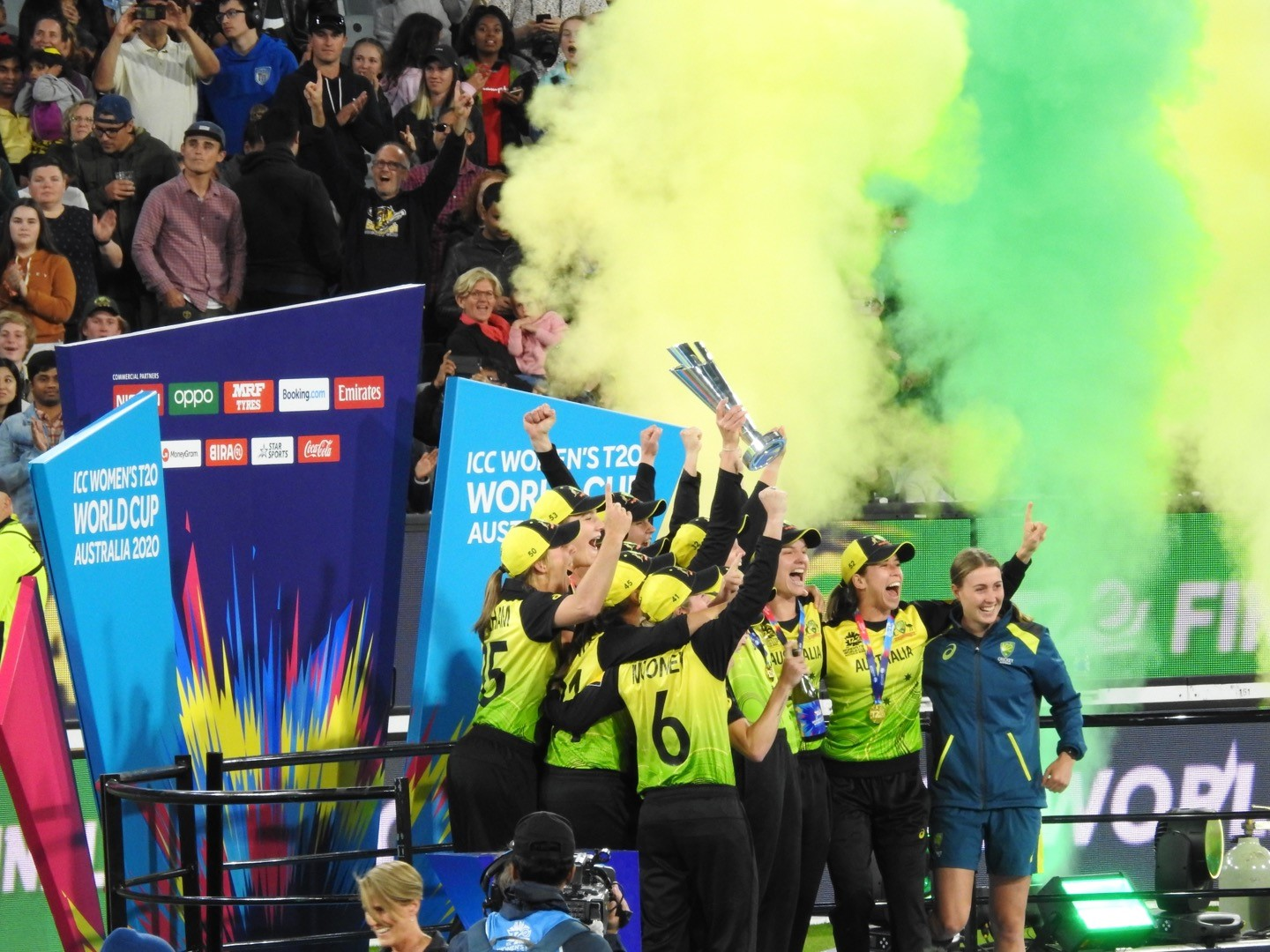
Australian women's cricket team celebrating after receiving the trophy

The match was played on International Women's Day and the attendance was 86,174. This set several records including the largest for a women's cricket match, breaking the estimated 50–60,000 who witnessed the 1997 Cricket World Cup final at Eden Gardens; the largest for a men's or women's ICC T20 World Cup final, exceeding the 66,000 that attended the 2016 ICC Men's World Twenty20 Final at Eden Gardens; the largest for a women's sporting event in Australia, surpassing the 53,034 at the Adelaide Oval for the 2019 AFL Women's Grand Final; and the largest for a final of the Women's T20 World Cup, eclipsing the 12,717 in attendance for the 2009 decider at Lord's. Organisers had hoped to beat the attendance of the women's association football 1999 FIFA Women's World Cup Final of 90,185, but failed. The largest women's sport attendance was 110,000 at the 1971 women's football World Cup final in Mexico.

== Aftermath ==
Following the tournament, Australia's Beth Mooney became the new number-one ranked cricketer for batting in the ICC Women's Rankings in WT20I cricket. India's Shafali Verma had previously been ranked at the top, when India reached the semi-finals of the tournament. However, after only scoring two runs in the final, Verma dropped down to third place, with Suzie Bates of New Zealand retaining second spot. A selection panel named its team of the tournament, with five Australians in the squad (Healy, Mooney, Lanning, Jonassen and Schutt). India's Poonam Yadav made the final XI, with Shafali Verma named as 12th woman The rest of the squad had four players from England (Sciver, Knight, Ecclestone and Shrubsole) and one from South Africa (Wolvaardt).
