= List of Australia women Twenty20 International cricketers =

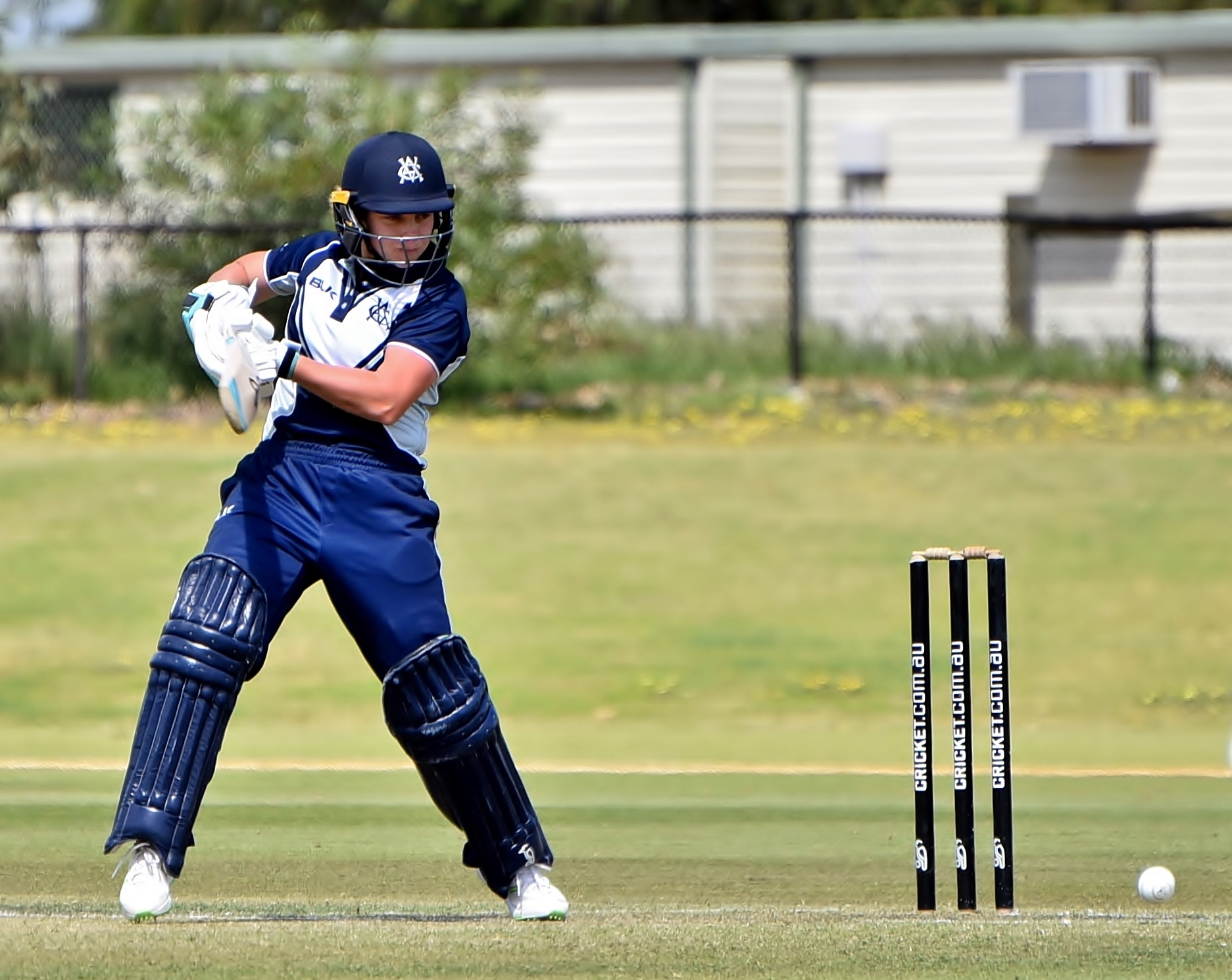
Sophie Molineux is Australia's current serving captain in Women's Twenty20 International, having held the position since 2026.

Since their first match in 2005, 61 women have represented the Australia national women's cricket team in Twenty20 Internationals (WT20Is). A Twenty20 International is a cricket match between two international representative teams, each having WT20I status, as determined by the International Cricket Council (ICC).

This list includes all players who have played at least one Twenty20 International match and is arranged in the order of debut appearance. Where more than one player won their first cap in the same match, those players are listed alphabetically by the surname at the time of debut. Boldface denotes players who've played within the past year.

== Key ==
General

- ‡ – Captain
- † – Wicket-keeper
- First – Year of debut
- Last – Year of latest game
- Mat – Number of matches played
- Win% – Winning percentage

Batting

- Runs – Runs scored in career
- HS – Highest score
- 50 – Half-centuries scored
- 100 – Centuries scored
- Avg – Runs scored per dismissal
- * – Batsman remained not out

Bowling

- Balls – Balls bowled in career
- Wkt – Wickets taken in career
- BBI – Best bowling in an innings
- Ave – Average runs per wicket

Fielding

- Ca – Catches taken
- St – Stumpings taken

== Players ==
Statistics are correct as of 22 October 2026.

Australia women T20I cricketers
General					Batting					Bowling					Fielding		Ref
Cap	Name	First	Last	Mat	Runs	HS	Avg	50	100	Balls	Wkt	BBI	Ave	5WI	Ca	St	Ref
1	Alex Blackwell ‡	2005	2017	95	1,314	61	21.19	1	0	6	0	–	–	0	33	0	
2	Kate Blackwell	2005	2008	6	119	43*	39.66	0	0	18	0	–	–	0	2	0	
3	Belinda Clark ‡	2005	2005	1	4	4	4.00	0	0	–	–	–	–	–	1	0	
4	Sarah Elliott	2005	2011	14	62	19*	7.75	0	0	86	6	3/17	14.83	0	5	0	
5	Cathryn Fitzpatrick	2005	2006	2	–	–	–	–	–	48	0	–	–	0	1	0	
6	Julie Hayes	2005	2006	2	–	–	–	–	–	42	2	2/19	23.5	0	2	0	
7	Lisa Keightley †	2005	2005	1	1	1	1.00	0	0	–	–	–	–	–	0	0	
8	Shelley Nitschke	2005	2011	36	776	56	23.51	3	0	768	43	4/21	16.39	0	6	0	
9	Kirsten Pike	2005	2009	10	1	1	1.00	0	0	169	5	1/13	41.40	0	0	0	
10	Karen Rolton ‡	2005	2009	15	405	96*	50.62	2	0	36	3	2/26	12.33	0	6	0	
11	Lisa Sthalekar	2005	2013	54	769	52	21.36	1	0	1,196	60	4/18	19.35	0	16	0	
12	Sarah Andrews	2006	2010	16	12	10*	–	0	0	327	10	3/16	36.8	0	3	0	
13	Melissa Bulow	2006	2007	2	15	11	7.50	0	0	–	–	–	–	–	0	0	
14	Michelle Goszko	2006	2006	1	9	9	9.00	0	0	–	–	–	–	–	0	0	
15	Leah Poulton	2006	2012	40	784	61	20.63	2	0	18	2	2/20	10.00	0	7	0	
16	Jodie Fields ‡†	2006	2013	37	249	37*	22.63	0	0	–	–	–	–	–	25	15	
17	Kris Britt	2007	2008	2	44	39	22.00	0	0	12	0	–	–	0	0	0	
18	Emma Sampson	2007	2009	5	4	4*	–	0	0	102	4	2/16	21.50	0	2	0	
19	Clea Smith	2007	2011	13	5	1*	1.25	0	0	300	14	3/23	22.21	0	1	0	
20	Leonie Coleman †	2008	2008	2	9	9	9.00	0	0	–	–	–	–	–	1	0	
21	**Ellyse Perry**	2008	2026	184	2,558	75	31.19	12	0	2,495	131	4/12	18.54	0	51	0	
22	Delissa Kimmince	2008	2020	44	162	43	16.20	0	0	846	45	3/20	21.08	0	10	0	
23	Jess Cameron †	2009	2015	64	941	68*	20.91	3	0	–	–	–	–	–	34	0	
24	Lauren Ebsary	2009	2012	14	113	24*	14.12	0	0	–	–	–	–	–	4	0	
25	Erin Osborne	2009	2016	59	78	17*	8.66	0	0	1,124	48	4/19	22.88	0	25	0	
26	Rene Farrell	2009	2016	54	95	31*	11.87	0	0	1,113	55	4/15	20.90	0	9	0	
27	Elyse Villani	2009	2018	62	1,369	90*	28.52	12	0	–	–	–	–	–	16	0	
28	Rachael Haynes ‡	2010	2022	84	850	69*	26.56	3	0	44	4	3/19	18.50	0	29	0	
29	Alyssa Healy ‡†	2010	2024	162	3054	148*	25.45	17	1	–	–	–	–	–	65	63	
30	Julie Hunter	2010	2014	32	9	6	4.50	0	0	618	33	5/22	18.33	1	2	0	
31	Sarah Coyte	2010	2016	47	117	17*	13.00	0	0	962	47	4/5	20.82	0	15	0	
32	Meg Lanning ‡	2010	2023	132	3,405	133*	36.61	15	2	36	4	2/17	9.75	0	45	0	
33	Jess Jonassen	2012	2023	105	438	47	12.88	0	0	1,962	96	5/12	19.62	1	29	0	
34	Sharon Millanta	2012	2012	4	0	0	0.00	0	0	72	1	1/21	62.00	0	0	0	
35	Renee Chappell	2013	2013	2	–	–	–	–	–	42	2	1/23	29.00	0	0	0	
36	**Megan Schutt**	2013	2026	125	29	8*	3.22	0	0	2,533	152	5/15	17.78	1	11	0	
37	Holly Ferling	2013	2016	9	0	0	0.00	0	0	162	5	2/14	28.40	0	0	0	
38	Nicole Bolton	2014	2016	2	6	6	6.00	0	0	–	–	–	–	–	2	0	
39	Kristen Beams	2014	2017	18	6	4*	6.00	0	0	378	20	3/11	16.60	0	4	0	
40	**Grace Harris**	2015	2026	55	578	64*	21.40	1	0	186	9	2/7	19.77	0	16	0	
41	**Beth Mooney** †	2016	2026	128	3,860	117*	41.50	31	2	–	–	–	–	–	54	5	
42	Naomi Stalenberg	2016	2016	1	–	–	–	–	–	–	–	–	–	–	1	0	
43	Lauren Cheatle	2016	2016	7	4	4*	–	0	0	114	5	2/13	24.40	0	1	0	
44	**Ashleigh Gardner**	2017	2026	109	1,740	93	26.76	10	0	1,660	86	5/12	21.45	1	34	0	
45	Molly Strano	2017	2020	7	6	3	1.50	0	0	150	9	5/10	17.55	1	3	0	
46	Amanda-Jade Wellington	2017	2018	8	9	8	9.00	0	0	120	10	4/16	11.20	0	3	0	
47	Sarah Aley	2017	2017	2	1	1	1.00	0	0	24	0	–	–	0	0	0	
48	**Sophie Molineux** ‡	2018	2026	54	118	25	8.42	0	0	1035	57	4/16	18.68	0	20	0	
49	**Nicola Carey**	2018	2026	41	159	24*	26.50	0	0	446	19	3/15	28.31	0	16	0	
50	**Georgia Wareham**	2018	2026	85	419	57	15.51	1	0	1,344	84	3/11	15.96	0	34	0	
51	Tayla Vlaeminck	2018	2024	20	0	0	0.00	0	0	366	18	3/12	21.27	0	7	0	
52	Erin Burns	2019	2019	5	30	30*	–	0	0	48	0	–	–	0	1	0	
53	**Annabel Sutherland**	2020	2026	58	286	23*	13.00	0	0	935	51	4/8	20.41	0	32	0	
54	**Darcie Brown**	2021	2026	41	17	8*	17.00	0	0	774	34	3/20	25.20	0	13	0	
55	Hannah Darlington	2021	2021	2	–	–	–	–	–	18	0	–	–	0	3	0	
56	**Tahlia McGrath** †	2021	2026	60	1,160	91*	41.42	7	0	381	21	3/13	24.57	0	16	0	
57	**Alana King**	2022	2026	30	29	18*	14.50	0	0	529	32	4/8	17.59	0	7	0	
58	**Kim Garth** (Note: Kim Garth also played 51 Twenty20 International matches for Ireland. Only her record for Australia is given above.)	2022	2026	25	20	7*	20.00	0	0	491	20	2/16	29.30	0	1	0	
59	Heather Graham	2022	2024	5	–	–	–	–	–	84	8	4/8	14.12	0	1	0	
60	**Phoebe Litchfield**	2022	2026	39	687	64*	27.48	3	0	–	–	–	–	–	7	0	
61	**Georgia Voll**	2025	2026	22	604	101	30.20	3	1	6	0	–	–	–	9	0	
62	Lucy Hamilton	2026	2026	9	–	–	–	–	–	126	3	1/11	39.66	0	3	0	

== Captains ==
Australia Women's T20I captains
No.	Name	First	Last	Matches	Won	Lost	Tied	No Result	Win% (Note: Percentage is worked out by counting tied games as half a win and excluding no results from the equation.)
1	Belinda Clark	2005	2005	1	1	0	0	0	100.00
2	Karen Rolton	2007	2007	13	8	4	1	0	65.38
3	Jodie Fields	2009	2013	26	16	10	0	0	61.53
4	Alex Blackwell	2010	2016	20	8	11	1	0	42.50
5	Meg Lanning	2014	2023	100	76	18	1	5	80.52
6	Rachael Haynes	2017	2020	6	3	3	0	0	50.00
7	Alyssa Healy	2022	2024	25	19	5	1	0	78.00
8	Tahlia McGrath	2022	2025	9	8	1	0	0	88.88
9	Sophie Molineux	2026	2026	16	13	2	0	0	86.66

== See also ==
- List of Australia Twenty20 International cricketers
- List of Australia women Test cricketers
- List of Australia women ODI cricketers
