= Ken Healy =

Australian cricketer (born 1967)

Personal information
- Born: 15 October 1967 (age 59); Brisbane, Queensland, Australia
- Batting: Left-handed
- Bowling: Left-arm medium
- Relatives: Ian Healy (brother); Alyssa Healy (niece)

Domestic team information
- Years: Team
- 1990/91–1991/92: Queensland
- Source: Cricinfo, 22 January 2022

Ken Healy (born 15 October 1967) is an Australian cricketer. He played in one first-class and one List A match for Queensland between 1990 and 1992. He is the brother of former Australia wicketkeeper Ian Healy and the uncle of Australia women wicketkeeper Alyssa Healy.

== See also ==
- List of Queensland first-class cricketers
