= Donna Brown (cricketer) =

Australian cricketer (born 1982)

Personal information
- Full name: Donna Kimberley Brown
- Born: 2 July 1982 (age 44); Bacchus Marsh, Victoria, Australia
- Batting: Left-handed
- Role: Opening batter

Domestic team information
- Years: Team
- 2007/08–2009/10: Western Australia

Career statistics
Competition	WLA	WT20
Matches	19	6
Runs scored	145	22
Batting average	12.08	11.00
100s/50s	0/0	0/0
Top score	21	9*
Catches/stumpings	1/–	0/–
- Source: CricketArchive, 1 July 2021

Donna Kimberley Brown (born 2 July 1982) is a former Australian cricketer who is a left-handed opening batter. Born in Bacchus Marsh, Victoria, she represented Western Australia in 19 List A matches during three seasons (2007/08–2009/10) of the Women's National Cricket League (WNCL).
