= Courtney Cramey =

Australian rules footballer

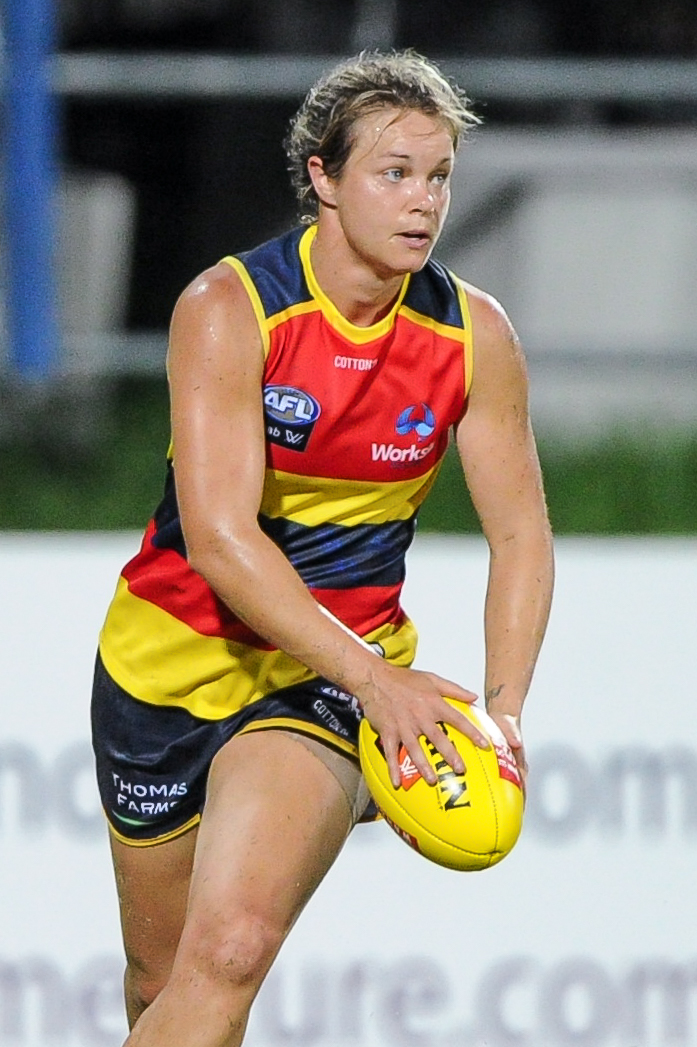
- Cramey playing for Adelaide in January 2018

Personal information
- Full name: Courtney Jane Cramey
- Nickname: CJ
- Born: 28 November 1985 (age 40)
- Original team: Morphettville Park (SAWFL)
- Draft: Priority signing, 2016: Adelaide
- Debut: Round 1, 2017, Adelaide vs. Greater Western Sydney, at Thebarton Oval
- Height: 169 cm (5 ft 7 in)
- Position: Utility

Playing career^{1}
Years	Club	Games (Goals)
2017–2020	Adelaide	20 (2)

Representative team honours^{2}
Years	Team	Games (Goals)
2017	The Allies	1 (0)
- ^{1} Playing statistics correct to the end of the 2020 season.^{2} Representative statistics correct as of the 2018 season.

Career highlights
- AFLW: 2× AFL Women's premiership player: 2017, 2019; AFLW All-Australian team: 2017; State: 4× SAWFL premiership player: 2004, 2014, 2015, 2016; SAWFL Grand Final best on ground: 2014; Captain, South Australian representative team: 2011-; All-Australian team: 2011

Courtney Jane Cramey (born 28 November 1985) is a former Australian rules footballer who played 20 matches over four seasons at the Adelaide Football Club in the AFL Women's competition. She was a two-time premiership player and a one-time All-Australian.

== Early life and state league football ==
Cramey played football throughout primary school as the only girl in teams that were otherwise all boys. In high school, she turned to basketball due to the lack of girls' football teams.

Cramey began playing women's football in 2004 with Sturt Football Club in the South Australian Women's Football League (SAWFL). She later played with Morphettville Park, where she mentored future fellow Adelaide Crow and AFLW all-Australian Ebony Marinoff. Cramey was best on ground and team captain in Morphettville Parks' first women's division 1 premiership, in 2014. She captained the team to second and third successive premierships in 2015 and 2016.

Along with Morphettville Park teammates Kellie Gibson and Ebony Marinoff, Cramey was selected by Melbourne for a women's all-star exhibition match at the Whitten Oval in 2016.

== AFL Women's career ==
Cramey was a priority selection by Adelaide before the 2016 AFL Women's draft. She made her debut in the club's inaugural match, in round one 2017 against Greater Western Sydney, listed to start as centre. As well as center, Cramey was listed to start as a forward, a defender and as a rover over the course of the season.

Cramey suffered a concussion in round seven, but participated in team practice the following week. She recovered to play her best game of the season in the inaugural AFLW Premiership, recording 23 disposals, second only to Erin Phillips. After the season, Cramey was listed in the All-Australian team.

Adelaide signed Cramey for the 2018 season during the trade period in May 2017. She missed the first three rounds of the season due to a hamstring injury but returned for round four to bolster the Crows' defence. After 20 games over four seasons, Cramey retired at the end of the 2020 season.

== Post-playing career ==
Cramey was one of five judges for the 2021 AFLW Grand Final best on ground award, and the only judge not to give any votes to the winner Kate Lutkins who polled 12 out of 15 votes.

== Personal life ==
Cramey is a social worker, employed by the South Australian correctional services department as a principal advisor for parolees and people in Community Based Corrections.

== Statistics ==
Legend
G	Goals	K	Kicks	D	Disposals	T	Tackles
B	Behinds	H	Handballs	M	Marks

Season	Team	No.	Games	Totals							Averages (per game)						
Season	Team	No.	Games	G	B	K	H	D	M	T	G	B	K	H	D	M	T
2017	Adelaide	22	8	0	2	60	10	70	16	19	0.0	0.3	7.5	1.3	8.8	2.0	2.4
2018	Adelaide	22	4	1	1	36	3	39	10	9	0.3	0.3	9.0	2.5	9.8	2.5	2.3
2019	Adelaide	22	7	1	0	56	25	81	13	25	0.1	0.0	8.0	3.6	11.6	1.9	3.6
2020	Adelaide	22	1	0	0	5	0	5	0	2	0.0	0.0	5.0	0.0	5.0	0.0	2.0
Career			20	2	3	157	38	195	39	55	0.1	0.2	7.9	1.9	9.8	2.0	2.8
