= Ian Healy =

Australian cricketer (born 1964)

Ian Healy AO
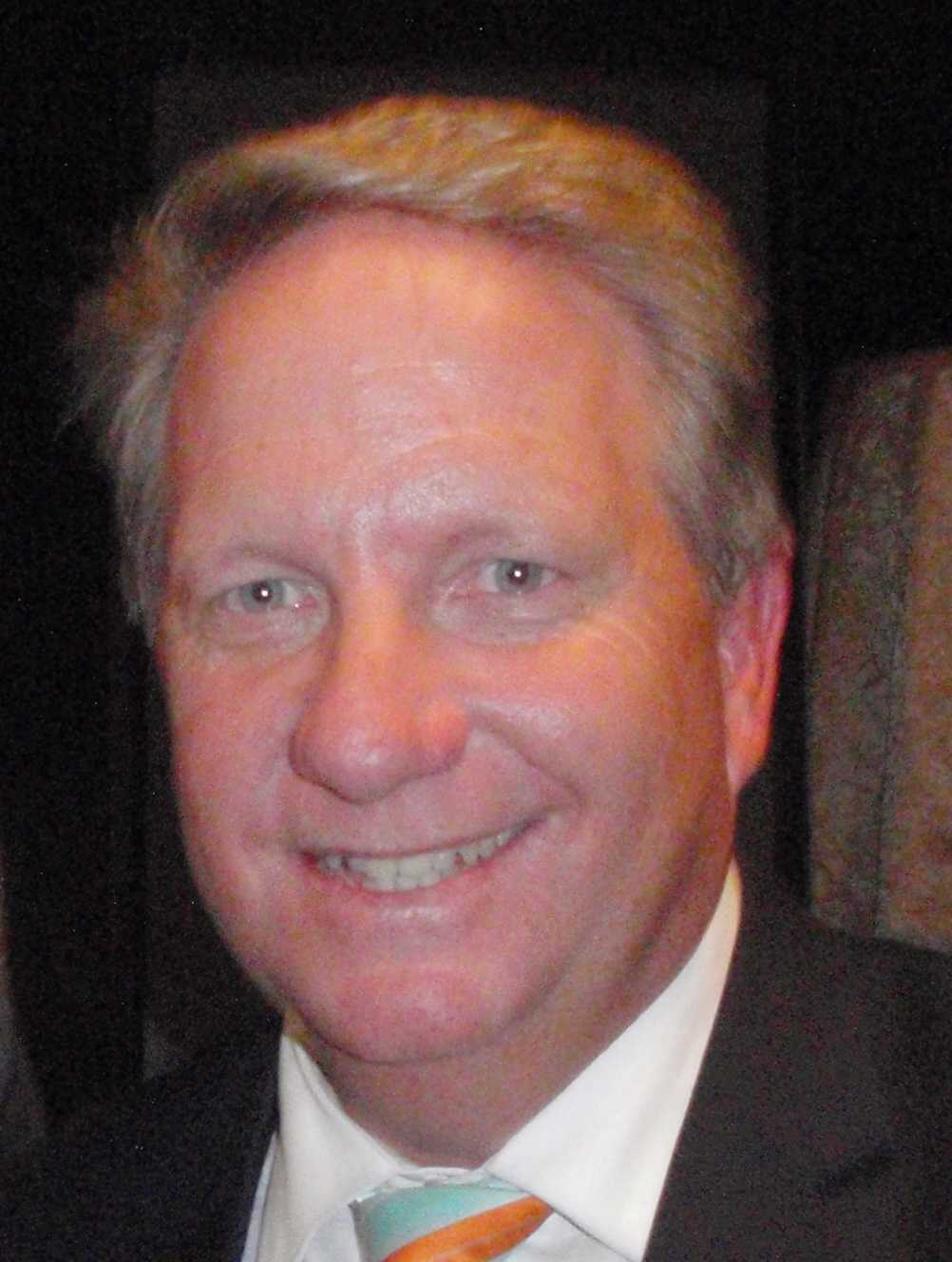

Personal information
- Full name: Ian Andrew Healy
- Born: 30 April 1964 (age 62); Brisbane, Queensland, Australia
- Nickname: Heals
- Height: 175 cm (5 ft 9 in)
- Batting: Right-handed
- Role: Wicket-keeper-batter
- Relatives: Ken (brother); Alyssa (niece)

International information
- National side: Australia (1988–1999)
- Test debut (cap 344): 15 September 1988 v Pakistan
- Last Test: 17 October 1999 v Zimbabwe
- ODI debut (cap 102): 14 October 1988 v Pakistan
- Last ODI: 25 May 1997 v England

Domestic team information
- Years: Team
- 1986/1987–1999/2000: Queensland

Career statistics
Competition	Test	ODI	FC	LA
Matches	119	168	231	212
Runs scored	4,356	1,764	8,341	2,183
Batting average	27.39	21.00	30.22	20.99
100s/50s	4/22	0/4	4/39	0/4
Top score	161*	56	161*	56
Catches/stumpings	366/29	194/39	698/69	254/46
Medal record
Men's Cricket
Representing Australia
ICC Cricket World Cup
Runner-up	1996 India-Pakistan-Sri Lanka
- Source: Cricinfo, 30 March 2017

Ian Andrew Healy AO (born 30 April 1964) is an Australian former international cricketer who played for Queensland domestically. A wicketkeeper and right-hand middle-order batsman, he first played international cricket in 1988, after six first-class games. Over the next decade, Healy was a member of the side as it enjoyed a period of success. By the time of his retirement, Healy held the world record for most Test dismissals by a wicket-keeper. He was a part of the Australian squad which finished as runners-up at the 1996 Cricket World Cup.

All of his four first-class centuries were scored in Test matches. In one day internationals, he averaged 21 while scoring at a rate of 83.8 runs per hundred balls. He captained Australia in eight one day internationals when the regular skipper Mark Taylor was injured.

== Early life ==
Born in the Brisbane suburb of Spring Hill, Healy was educated at Brisbane State High School. Healy and his family relocated 600 kilometres (370 mi) north to the small town of Biloela in 1972, due to his father's transfer in his job as a bank manager. Rod Marsh inspired Healy to take up wicket-keeping; he also played basketball, soccer, squash and rugby league. He represented the Queensland under-11 team and later attended a clinic conducted by the touring Queensland cricketers. The team's wicket-keeper John Maclean gave him some specialist coaching, which gave his junior career further impetus.

During his later years in the town, Healy played alongside adults, which accelerated his progress. Returning to Brisbane with his family at the age of 17 he played for Brisbane State High School 1st XI and 1st XV. He then joined the Northern Suburbs club in Brisbane's grade competition in 1982. After three matches for the Queensland Colts as a specialist batsman, Healy made his first-class debut in 1986–87 as a replacement for the injured Peter Anderson. However, Anderson remained the first choice as the state's wicketkeeper for the next eighteen months, during which time Healy managed only six first-class appearances.

== International career ==
Given his small number of games for Queensland, Healy's selection for the Australian team to tour Pakistan in late 1988 was a major surprise. The wicket-keeping position had proved a problem for Australia since the 1984 retirement of Healy's boyhood hero, Rod Marsh. Wayne B. Phillips, Tim Zoehrer, Greg Dyer and Steve Rixon had all been tried with little success. Australian selector Greg Chappell had watched Healy's progress in Queensland, and believed that he offered the lower-order batting stability and determined approach to the game that the Australian team was lacking.

By his own admission, Healy was overwhelmed by his sudden elevation and took some time to settle into the team. The selectors persevered with him through the difficult Pakistan tour and the subsequent home series against the West Indies, even though Australia lost both series.

An improvement in the team's performances coincided with Healy's establishment as a Test-class player. On the tour of England in 1989, he was safe behind the stumps in taking 14 Test catches, but averaged only 17.16 with the bat, as Australia won 4–0 to regain the Ashes. In seven Tests against New Zealand, Sri Lanka and Pakistan during the extended season of 1989–90, Healy accepted 23 catches and recorded a top score of 48.

=== First century ===
Ian Healy's record as captain
	Matches	Won	Lost	Drawn	Tied	No result	Win %
ODI	8	5	3	0	0	0	62.5%
Date last Updated:		2 September 2015					

Although Australia lost the series with the West Indies and drew with New Zealand in 1992–93, the team had a successful tour of England in 1993 when Healy hit his maiden Test century. His form had gradually improved, culminating in an unbeaten 102 at Old Trafford when he dominated a partnership with Steve Waugh. With the introduction to the team of Shane Warne, Healy was able to demonstrate his skills standing up to the stumps and reading the varied deliveries of the spinner. In his first 39 Tests, Healy stumped two batsmen. In 14 Tests between 1992 and 1993, he stumped ten batsmen while taking 52 catches.

Healy followed up with another century, against New Zealand at Perth in 1993–94. Healy was also well known for his energy and optimism behind the stumps, and could frequently be heard on effects microphones encouraging the rest of the team, perhaps most prominently praise of Shane Warne, expressed as 'bowling, Warnie'. Notable too was his attitude to injuries; despite breaking all of his fingers during his thirteen-year career he only ever missed one Test match, replaced by Phil Emery in Pakistan.

Healy twice captained an Australian XI, in tour matches against the West Indians in 1991–92 and 1992–93. In 1993, he led an official Australian team at the Hong Kong six-a-side tournament and replaced Allan Border as captain of Queensland in 1992–93. However, when Border retired at the end of the 1994 tour of South Africa, Healy was not seen as viable successor as Australian captain for two reasons. Firstly, only one wicket-keeper had led Australia in the previous one hundred years. Secondly, his various on-field confrontations were sometimes held against him.

=== Omitted from One Day Internationals team ===
Australia made the much-debated decision to separate the teams for playing Tests and ODIs for the 1997–98 season. This affected Healy and the captain, Mark Taylor, both of whom were dropped from the ODI team. Sri Lanka won the 1996 World Cup utilising a strategy of ultra-aggressive opening batsmen hitting as many runs as possible in the early overs of the innings. Adam Gilchrist, a wicket-keeper himself, had displayed the potential to play this type of game since his ODI debut the previous year. Gilchrist then became the ODI team's wicket-keeper as well, allowing Australia to play an extra specialist (bowler or batsman) in the batting place previously occupied by Healy. Both Healy and Taylor made their disappointment with the decision known. However, Gilchrist hit a brilliant century during the finals of the Carlton and United Series, which Australia won after failing to qualify for the previous season. Healy finished his ODI career with a world record 233 dismissals, a mark since overtaken by Gilchrist, Mark Boucher, Moin Khan, Kumar Sangakkara and M.S.Dhoni.

Healy maintained his Test place, beginning the season with scores of 68 at Brisbane and 85 at Perth against New Zealand. His only other innings of substance was 46 not out against South Africa in the second Test at Sydney. On the subsequent tour of India, Healy top-scored with 90 in the first Test at Chennai, which Australia lost.

=== World records ===
On 4 October 1998, Healy broke Rod Marsh's world record of 355 dismissals when he caught Wasim Akram from the bowling of Colin Miller, during the first Test against Pakistan at Rawalpindi. It was his 104th Test compared with Marsh's 96 Tests. Healy ended with 395 dismissals from 119 Tests. This tally was subsequently overtaken by South African wicketkeeper Mark Boucher (in his 103rd test, 16 fewer than Healy) and other Australian wicketkeeper Adam Gilchrist in his 96th Test which was his last. Boucher is currently the world record holder.

Healy also jointly holds the record in Test cricket (along with Mark Taylor) of being the only cricketers to have been run out in both innings of a Test on two occasions. Unfortunately, he played most ODIs for Australia without winning the Cricket World Cup.

=== Anticlimactic farewell ===
After four months off, the Australian team toured Sri Lanka in August and September 1999. In the three Tests, Healy made only 25 runs and took four catches. The team made a brief visit to Zimbabwe the following month, to play the inaugural Test between the two nations, at Harare. Healy made five and took two catches.

During the lead-up to the 1999–2000 season, the selectors made it clear that they wanted Adam Gilchrist to keep for the Test team as well as the ODI side. Initially, Healy requested that he be allowed to play one more season and then retire, which was refused. He then asked to play the first Test, scheduled for his home ground at Brisbane, as a farewell. This, too, was refused, so he announced his immediate retirement from all forms of the game in a statement released on 28 October 1999. In response to the tremendous public farewells afforded to Shane Warne, Glenn McGrath and Justin Langer at the end of the fifth Test at Sydney in 2006–07, Healy called for long-standing players to have their farewells to the game managed more appropriately than his own.

== Post-retirement ==
Healy's performances were acknowledged when he was selected as the wicketkeeper in the Australian Cricket Board's team of the 20th century, ahead of greats such as Rod Marsh, Wally Grout and Don Tallon. He was also recognised as a Wisden Cricketer of the Year in 1994. He also embarked on a career presenting sport on the top-rating Nine News Queensland; he initially presented on weeknights in 2007 and 2008, before moving to weekends from 2009 until 2016, after regular weeknight sports presenter Wally Lewis made a full recovery from epilepsy. He has also coached the Somerville House cricket team. Since 1999, Healy has been a cricket commentator. He was inducted into the Sport Australia Hall of Fame in 2004 and the Australian Cricket Hall of Fame in 2008.

Healy began co-hosting the Breakfast with Pat & Heals breakfast program with Pat Welsh on 7 September 2020, when SEN Track was launched in both North Queensland and South East Queensland. The program was then also heard on new digital station SENQ in 2021. Healy continued co-hosting the program when 693 SENQ launched on the 693 AM frequency in Brisbane on 1 July 2022 after the Sports Entertainment Network acquired the license of long running Brisbane music station 4KQ from the Australian Radio Network, a subsidiary of HT&E.

In March 2021, the Ian Healy Oval in Brisbane became a first-class cricket venue.

== Family ==
Healy has two brothers and a sister; Ken, Greg and Kim. Ken played a single Sheffield Shield game for Queensland in 1990 and a single List-A game in 1991, while Greg was also a member of the wider Queensland squad. Ian is married to wife Helen, with whom he has two daughters, Emma and Laura, and a son, Tom. His niece Alyssa Healy wicket–keeps for the Australia women's national cricket team, formerly known as the Southern Stars. Alyssa married her childhood friend, Australian fast bowler Mitchell Starc in April 2016, making him Ian's nephew-in-law.

Sporting positions
Preceded by Allan Border	Queensland ING Cup captain 1992/93–1999/00	Succeeded by Stuart Law
Preceded by Allan Border	Queensland Sheffield Shield captain 1992/93–1999/00	Succeeded by Stuart Law
Preceded by Mark Taylor	Australian One Day International cricket captains 1996–1996/7	Succeeded by Steve Waugh
Media offices
Preceded by Wally Lewis	Nine News Queensland; Weeknight sports presenter 2007–2008	Succeeded by Wally Lewis
