= Jess Sedunary =

Australian rules footballer

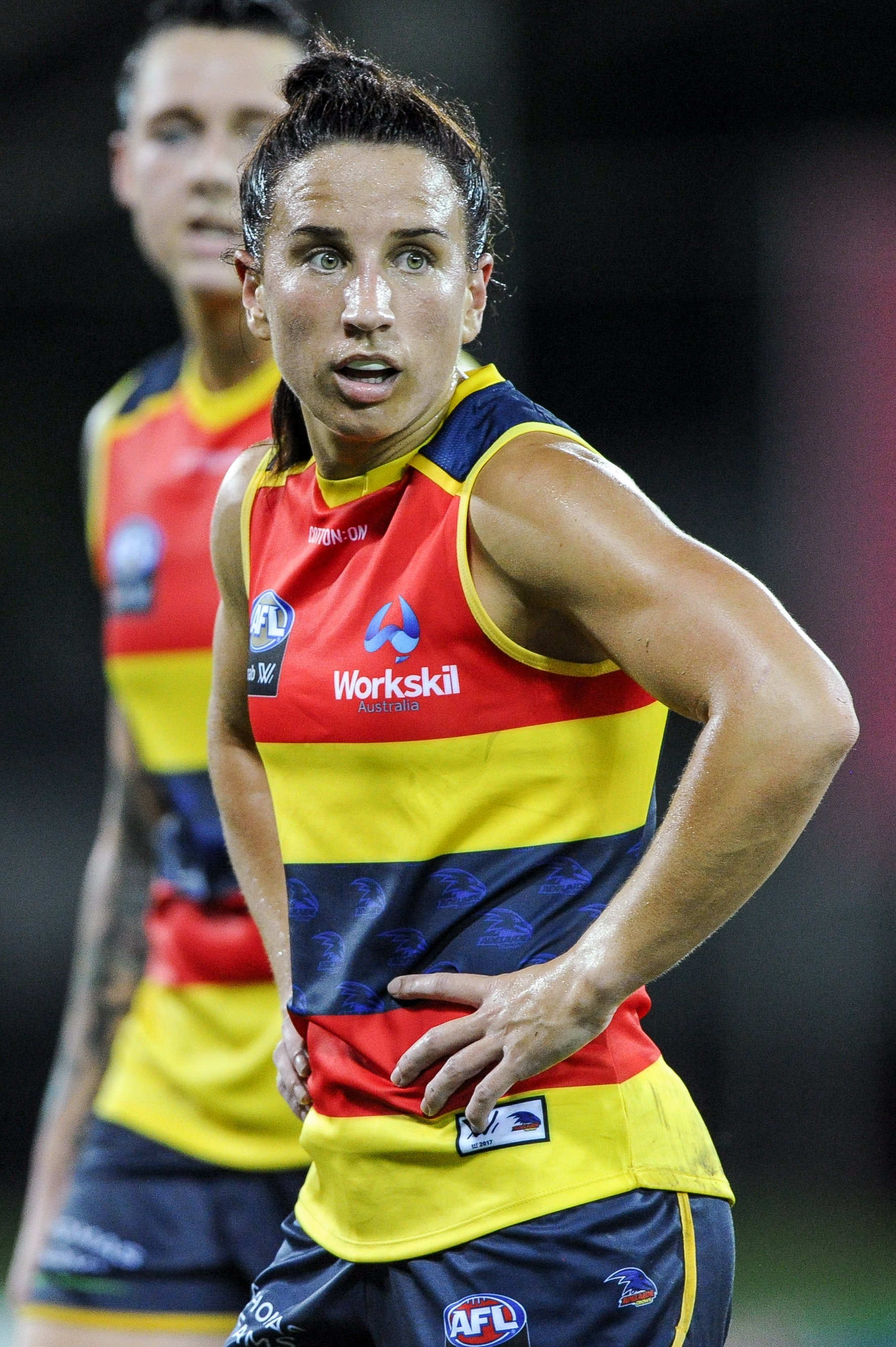
- Sedunary playing for Adelaide in 2018

Personal information
- Full name: Jessica Sedunary
- Born: 10 November 1990 (age 36)
- Original team: Morphettville Park (SAWFL)
- Draft: No. 119, 2016 AFL Women's draft
- Debut: Round 1, 2017, Adelaide vs. Greater Western Sydney, at Thebarton Oval
- Height: 168 cm (5 ft 6 in)
- Position: Midfielder

Club information
- Current club: West Coast
- Number: 10

Playing career^{1}
Years	Club	Games (Goals)
2017–2019	Adelaide	15 (5)
2020	St Kilda	4 (2)
2021–2022 (S6)	Adelaide	2 (1)
2022 (S7)–	West Coast	8 (0)
Total		29 (8)

Representative team honours^{2}
Years	Team	Games (Goals)
2017	The Allies	1 (0)
- ^{1} Playing statistics correct to the end of 2022 (S7).^{2} Representative statistics correct as of 2017.

Career highlights
- AFLW premiership player: 2017

Jessica Sedunary (born 10 November 1990) is an Australian rules football Premiership Player. Retired in 2023 playing for the West Coast Eagles in the AFL Women's (AFLW). She has previously played for the Adelaide Football Club from 2017 to 2019 and 2021 to 2022 (S6) and the St Kilda Football Club in 2020.

== Early life ==
Sedunary grew up in Minlaton on the Yorke Peninsula. Originally her sport of choice was hockey, which forced her to drives to Adelaide and back every week for games and training. Her family moved to Adelaide when she was in high school, and she switched to cycling within weeks when the South Australian Sports Institute saw her potential. She went on to represent Australia in the 2007 Australian Youth Olympic Festival in cycling. After a year of study at university Sedunary was forced to drop her studies and her cycling due to financial constraints.

Sedunary first played football accidentally. She went to a friend's football game to spectate, but when a player was injured she had to replace them on the field, having never kicked a football before. With no professional Australian rules football competition for women existing yet, Sedunary briefly signed with a lingerie gridiron club as it was similar to football. The competition was disbanded before a game had been played and, rather than pursuing gridiron further she quit and returned to football. In 2016 she joined Morphettville Park Football Club and won the South Australian Women's Football League premiership with them.

== AFLW career (2017–) ==
Sedunary was drafted by Adelaide with their fifteenth selection and 119th overall in the 2016 AFL Women's draft. She made her debut in the thirty-six point win against Greater Western Sydney at Thebarton Oval in the opening round of the 2017 season. She was a part of Adelaide's premiership side after the club defeated Brisbane by six points at Metricon Stadium in the AFL Women's Grand Final. She played every match in her debut season to finish with eight matches, and she came fourth in Adelaide's Club Champion award.

Adelaide signed Sedunary for the 2018 season during the trade period in May 2017.

In April 2019, Sedunary joined expansion club St Kilda, but returned to play with the Crows after playing only one season with St Kilda.

Sedunary was placed on the list of inactive players for 2022 season 6 while she trained with Cycling Australia's Olympic Fast Track Program in an effort to qualify for the 2024 Summer Olympics.

In June 2022, Sedunary was traded to West Coast in exchange for Niamh Kelly and Amber Ward.
