= Brittany Perry =

Australian rules football player

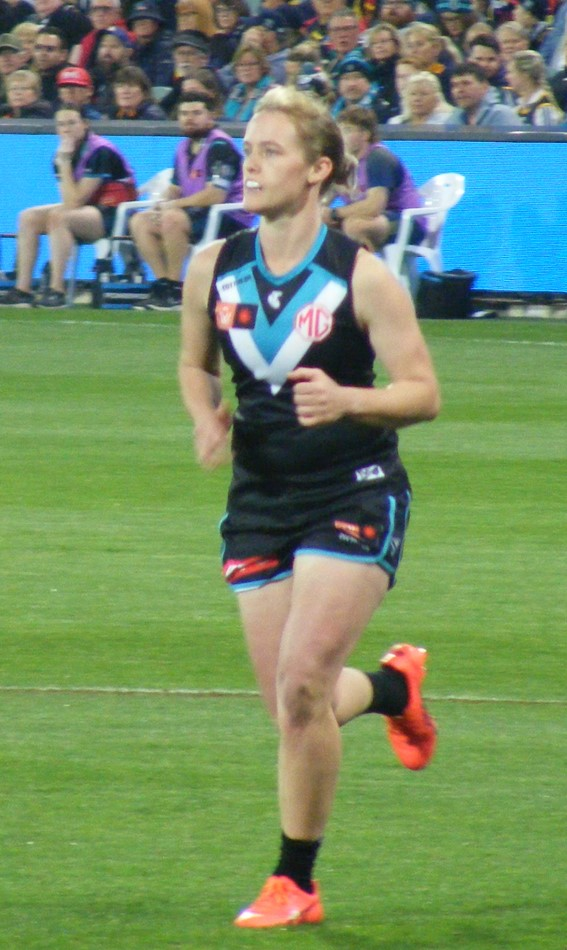

Personal information
- Born: 9 March 1994 (age 32)
- Original team: North Adelaide (SANFLW)
- Draft: No. 43, 2018 AFL Women's draft
- Debut: Round 2, 2019, Greater Western Sydney vs. North Melbourne, at Drummoyne Oval
- Height: 165 cm (5 ft 5 in)
- Position: Forward

Playing career^{1}
Years	Club	Games (Goals)
2019	Greater Western Sydney	4 (0)
2020–2022 (S6)	Gold Coast	14 (4)
2022 (S7)	Port Adelaide	6 (4)
Total		24 (8)
- ^{1} Playing statistics correct to the end of 2022 season 7.

Brittany Perry (born 9 March 1994) is a former Australian rules footballer who played for Port Adelaide in the AFL Women's competition (AFLW). She previously played for the Greater Western Sydney Giants and the Gold Coast Suns.

She was selected at pick 43 in the 2018 draft and made her debut in round 2 of the 2019 season. Perry played four matches in her debut season before being delisted by the Giants.

In June 2022, Perry was traded to Port Adelaide. In March 2023, Perry was delisted with teammate Tessa Doumanis.
