= Renee Chappell =

Australian cricketer

Personal information
- Full name: Renee Kathleen Chappell
- Born: 7 July 1983 (age 43); Subiaco, Western Australia
- Batting: Right-handed
- Bowling: Right arm offbreak

International information
- National side: Australia (2013)
- ODI debut (cap 124): 1 February 2013 v Pakistan
- Last ODI: 13 February 2013 v West Indies
- T20I debut (cap 35): 22 January 2013 v New Zealand
- Last T20I: 24 January 2013 v New Zealand

Domestic team information
- Years: Team
- 2000/01–2012/13: Western Australia

Career statistics
Competition	WODI	WT20I	LA	T20
Matches	2	2	88	42
Runs scored	8	–	690	172
Batting average	4.00	–	11.31	8.19
100s/50s	0/0	–	0/1	0/0
Top score	5	–	57	35*
Balls bowled	24	42	2,979	858
Wickets	0	2	92	42
Bowling average	–	29.00	21.96	19.54
5 wickets in innings	–	0	1	0
10 wickets in match	–	0	0	0
Best bowling	–	1/23	5/31	3/14
Catches/stumpings	0/–	0/–	27/–	18/–
- Source: CricketArchive, 14 June 2025

Renee Kathleen Chappell (born 7 July 1983) is an Australian former cricketer who played international cricket for Australia women's national cricket team. Chappell played domestic cricket for her home state of Western Australia from the 2000/01 season to the 2012/13 season. In January and February 2013, she played four matches for the Australian national cricket team, including two matches in the 2013 Women's Cricket World Cup.

== Cricket career ==
Chappell played for Western Australia's Under 19 team in the 1999/2000 season, and she was given the Fielder of the Tournament Award 2000. She was promoted to Western Australia's state team in the 2000/01 season and represented the state in the Indoor Cricket Championships in 2001. She continued to play for Western Australia for the rest of her cricket career.

Chappell was first called up to the Australian national cricket team in February 2008, when she was included in Australia's 14-player squad for the Rose Bowl in New Zealand. She did not play a game and did not return to the national team until 2013, after a successful season in the Women's National Cricket League. In January 2013, she replaced Jess Jonassen in Australia's squad ahead of the 2013 Women's Cricket World Cup when Jonassen suffered a knee injury and couldn't recover in time for the tournament.

Chappell played four matches for Australia in January and February 2013. She played in two T20I matches against New Zealand in January, taking one wicket in each match. She then played in two WODI matches as part of the World Cup, against Pakistan and the West Indies. Despite being a specialist bowler, she only bowled four overs across the two matches and didn't take a single wicket. These were the final four matches of her professional career, as she never played for Australia or Western Australia again.

In the years following her state and national career, Chappell continued to play cricket for Melville Cricket Club in Western Australia Premier Cricket. In the 2016/17 season, she won the Karen Read Medal for the best player in the A-grade and Twenty20 competitions for the season.
