= January Jackowiak =

Australian cricketer (born 1982)

Personal information
- Born: 29 January 1982 (age 44); Adelaide, South Australia
- Nickname: Jano, Uncle Jano, Tony T
- Batting: Right-handed

Domestic team information
- Years: Team
- 2000/01–2002/03: South Australia

Career statistics
Competition	WLA
Matches	17
Runs scored	39
Batting average	4.33
100s/50s	0/0
Top score	10*
Catches/stumpings	3/–
- Source: CricketArchive, 29 June 2021

January Jackowiak (born 29 January 1982) is a former Australian cricketer who is a right-handed batter. During the early 2000s, she played 17 List A matches for South Australia in the Women's National Cricket League (WNCL).
