= Emma Sampson =

Australian cricketer

Personal information
- Full name: Emma Margaret Sampson
- Born: 29 July 1985 (age 41); Adelaide, Australia
- Batting: Right-handed
- Bowling: Right-arm fast-medium
- Role: Bowler

International information
- National side: Australia (2007–2009)
- Only Test (cap 154): 15 February 2008 v England
- ODI debut (cap 108): 21 February 2007 v New Zealand
- Last ODI: 19 March 2009 v England
- T20I debut (cap 18): 19 July 2007 v New Zealand
- Last T20I: 15 February 2009 v New Zealand

Domestic team information
- Years: Team
- 2001/02–2008/09: South Australia
- 2009: Surrey

Career statistics
Competition	WTest	WODI	WT20I	WLA
Matches	1	30	5	102
Runs scored	0	27	4	440
Batting average	–	9.00	–	10.00
100s/50s	0/0	0/0	0/0	0/0
Top score	0*	9*	4*	44
Balls bowled	267	1,500	102	4,716
Wickets	3	39	4	109
Bowling average	31.00	24.02	21.50	26.30
5 wickets in innings	0	1	0	1
10 wickets in match	0	0	0	0
Best bowling	2/65	5/30	2/16	5/30
Catches/stumpings	0/–	8/–	2/–	26/–
- Source: CricketArchive, 29 December 2022

Emma Margaret Sampson (born 29 July 1985) is an Australian former cricketer who played as a right-arm pace bowler, and was considered one of the fastest in the women's game during her career, bowling at about 118 kilometres per hour (73 mph). She appeared in one Test match, 30 One Day Internationals and five Twenty20 Internationals for Australia between 2007 and 2009. She played domestic cricket for South Australia and Surrey.

After the 2009 World Cup, Sampson announced her "shock" retirement from cricket, at the age of 23. Her best international bowling figures came in a One Day International against New Zealand in 2008, where she took 5/30. Sampson did play again for Surrey after her announcement, in the 2009 Women's Twenty20 Cup and 2009 Women's County Championship, but did not play again after the 2009 season.

Sampson was the 154th woman to play Test cricket for Australia, and the 108th woman to play One Day International cricket for Australia.
