= 2022–23 Super Smash (women's cricket) =

Cricket tournament

2022–23 Women's Super Smash
- Dates: 23 December 2022 – 11 February 2023
- Administrator: New Zealand Cricket
- Cricket format: Twenty20
- Tournament format(s): Round robin and knockout finals
- Champions: Canterbury Magicians (6th title)
- Participants: 6
- Matches: 32
- Most runs: Kate Anderson (536)
- Most wickets: Gabby Sullivan (21)
- Official website: Super Smash

The 2022–23 Dream11 Super Smash was the sixteenth season of the women's Super Smash Twenty20 cricket competition played in New Zealand. It took place between 23 December 2022 and 11 February 2023, with 6 provincial teams taking part. Wellington Blaze were the defending champions.

The tournament ran alongside the 2022–23 Hallyburton Johnstone Shield.

Canterbury Magicians won the tournament after beating Wellington Blaze in the final, winning their sixth title.

== Competition format ==
Teams played in a double round-robin in a group of six, therefore playing 10 matches overall. Matches were played using a Twenty20 format. The top team in the group advanced straight to the final, whilst the second and third placed teams played off in an elimination final.

The group worked on a points system with positions being based on the total points. Points were awarded as follows:

Win: 4 points
Tie: 2 points
Loss: 0 points.
Abandoned/No Result: 2 points.

== Points table ==
Pos	Team	Pld	W	L	T	NR	Pts	NRR
1	Wellington Blaze (Q)	10	8	1	0	1	34	1.597
2	Otago Sparks (Q)	10	6	3	0	1	26	0.276
3	Canterbury Magicians (Q)	10	6	4	0	0	24	−0.137
4	Auckland Hearts	10	5	4	0	1	22	−0.066
5	Northern Brave	10	1	6	0	3	10	−0.850
6	Central Hinds	10	1	9	0	0	4	−1.076

Source: Dream11 Super Smash

advanced to Grand Final
advanced to Elimination Final

== Fixtures ==
=== Round-robin ===
23 December 2022
Scorecard

Canterbury Magicians; 146/7 (20 overs)	v	Northern Brave; 132/9 (20 overs)
Amy Satterthwaite 73* (52); Lucy Boucher 2/21 (3 overs)		Caitlin Gurrey 66 (48); Melissa Banks 3/20 (4 overs)

Canterbury Magicians won by 14 runs
Bay Oval, Mount Maunganui
Umpires: Cory Black and Damian Morrow

- Canterbury Magicians won the toss and elected to bat.
- Points: Canterbury Magicians 4, Northern Brave 0

24 December 2022
Scorecard

Wellington Blaze; 146/5 (20 overs)	v	Otago Sparks; 127/8 (20 overs)
Amelia Kerr 46 (42); Emma Black 3/24 (4 overs)		Kate Ebrahim 37 (38); Leigh Kasperek 3/16 (4 overs)

Wellington Blaze won by 19 runs
Basin Reserve, Wellington
Umpires: Billy Bowden and Tyron Davies

- Wellington Blaze won the toss and elected to bat.
- Points: Wellington Blaze 4, Otago Sparks 0

26 December 2022
Scorecard

Auckland Hearts; 144/4 (20 overs)	v	Canterbury Magicians; 145/4 (19 overs)
Saachi Shahri 68 (55); Lea Tahuhu 1/24 (4 overs)		Amy Satterthwaite 50* (46); Arlene Kelly 1/17 (3 overs)

Canterbury Magicians won by 6 wickets
Hagley Oval, Christchurch
Umpires: G McGowan and A Feely

- Auckland Hearts won the toss and elected to bat.
- Anna Browning (Hearts) and Izzy Sharp (Magicians) made their T20 debuts.
- Points: Canterbury Magicians 4, Auckland Hearts 0

27 December 2022
Scorecard

Wellington Blaze; 155/6 (20 overs)	v	Central Hinds; 109/9 (20 overs)
Leigh Kasperek 29 (19); Hannah Rowe 2/33 (4 overs)		Natalie Dodd 37 (35); Xara Jetly 3/15 (3 overs)

Wellington Blaze won by 46 runs
Fitzherbert Park, Palmerston North
Umpires: Derek Walker and John Dempsey

- Wellington Blaze won the toss and elected to bat.
- Flora Devonshire (Hinds) made her T20 debut.
- Points: Wellington Blaze 4, Central Hinds 0

28 December 2022
Scorecard

Otago Sparks; 165/3 (20 overs)	v	Northern Brave; 145/7 (20 overs)
Suzie Bates 101* (67); Kayley Knight 1/12 (3 overs)		Bernadine Bezuidenhout 41 (30); Kate Ebrahim 2/27 (4 overs)

Otago Sparks won by 20 runs
Queenstown Events Centre, Queenstown
Umpires: Eloise Sheridan and Shaun Haig

- Northern Brave won the toss and elected to field.
- Points: Otago Sparks 4, Northern Brave 0

29 December 2022
Scorecard

Otago Sparks; 130/7 (20 overs)	v	Auckland Hearts; 133/4 (19.3 overs)
Kate Ebrahim 40 (39); Arlene Kelly 2/15 (4 overs)		Lauren Down 44* (34); Caitlin Blakely 1/4 (1 over)

Auckland Hearts won by 6 wickets
Queenstown Events Centre, Queenstown
Umpires: Eloise Sheridan and Kim Cotton

- Otago Sparks won the toss and elected to bat.
- Points: Auckland Hearts 4, Otago Sparks 0

30 December 2022
Scorecard

Central Hinds; 88 (18.1 overs)	v	Canterbury Magicians; 89/2 (15.5 overs)
Hannah Rowe 30 (32); Lea Tahuhu 3/17 (4 overs)		Kate Anderson 33 (41); Georgia Atkinson 1/13 (2 overs)

Canterbury Magicians won by 8 wickets
Pukekura Park, New Plymouth
Umpires: Cory Black and Wayne Knights

- Canterbury Magicians won the toss and elected to field.
- Points: Canterbury Magicians 4, Central Hinds 0

31 December 2022
Scorecard

Northern Brave; 146/8 (20 overs)	v	Central Hinds; 142 (20 overs)
Samantha Curtis 50 (36); Claudia Green 3/23 (4 overs)		Hannah Rowe 50 (33); Amanda-Jade Wellington 3/29 (4 overs)

Northern Brave won by 4 runs
Pukekura Park, New Plymouth
Umpires: Cory Black and John Dempsey

- Central Hinds won the toss and elected to field.
- Points: Northern Brave 4, Central Hinds 0

1 January 2023
Scorecard

Wellington Blaze; 146 (20 overs)	v	Canterbury Magicians; 135/7 (20 overs)
Rebecca Burns 40 (28); Melissa Banks 3/21 (4 overs)		Kate Anderson 83* (62); Maneka Singh 2/18 (3 overs)

Wellington Blaze won by 11 runs
Hagley Oval, Christchurch
Umpires: Billy Bowden and Eloise Sheridan

- Wellington Blaze won the toss and elected to bat.
- Points: Wellington Blaze 4, Canterbury Magicians 0

2 January 2023
Scorecard

Otago Sparks; 159/3 (20 overs)	v	Auckland Hearts; 128/9 (20 overs)
Suzie Bates 76 (59); Fran Jonas 3/20 (4 overs)		Saachi Shahri 40 (38); Kate Ebrahim 3/15 (3 overs)

Otago Sparks won by 31 runs
Eden Park Outer Oval, Auckland
Umpires: Wayne Knights and Eugene Sanders

- Auckland Hearts won the toss and elected to field.
- Points: Otago Sparks 4, Auckland Hearts 0

4 January 2023
Scorecard

Wellington Blaze; 140/8 (20 overs)	v	Northern Brave; 81/9 (20 overs)
Thamsyn Newton 41 (44); Nensi Patel 3/28 (4 overs)		Marina Lamplough 32* (37); Sophie Devine 3/18 (3 overs)

Wellington Blaze won by 59 runs
Basin Reserve, Wellington
Umpires: John Dempsey and Tim Parlane

- Northern Brave won the toss and elected to field.
- Points: Wellington Blaze 4, Northern Brave 0

5 January 2023
Scorecard

Auckland Hearts; 112/5 (12 overs)	v	Central Hinds; 102/4 (12 overs)
Bella Armstrong 71 (34); Claudia Green 2/16 (2 overs)		Natalie Dodd 60 (40); Amie Hucker 2/20 (3 overs)

Auckland Hearts won by 10 runs
Pukekura Park, New Plymouth
Umpires: Greg Pennell and Kim Cotton

- Central Hinds won the toss and elected to field.
- Match reduced to 12 overs per side due to rain.
- Elizabeth Buchanan (Hearts) made her T20 debut.
- Points: Auckland Hearts 4, Central Hinds 0

6 January 2023
Scorecard

Northern Brave; 122/7 (18.4 overs)	v	Otago Sparks
Eimear Richardson 37 (30); Kate Ebrahim 2/13 (3 overs)

No Result
Seddon Park, Hamilton
Umpires: Chris Brown and Christelle High

- Otago Sparks won the toss and elected to field.
- No further play possible due to rain.
- Points: Northern Brave 2, Otago Sparks 2

7 January 2023
Scorecard

Central Hinds; 148/2 (20 overs)	v	Wellington Blaze; 62/1 (6.5 overs)
Natalie Dodd 78* (63); Amelia Kerr 1/21 (4 overs)		Amelia Kerr 27* (14); Hannah Rowe 1/12 (2 overs)

Wellington Blaze won by 18 runs (DLS method)
Basin Reserve, Wellington
Umpires: Derek Walker and Kannan Jagannathan

- Central Hinds won the toss and elected to bat.
- Wellington Blaze innings curtailed at 6.5 overs due to rain; target was 44.
- Points: Wellington Blaze 4, Central Hinds 0

8 January 2023
Scorecard

Canterbury Magicians; 137/8 (20 overs)	v	Auckland Hearts; 110/9 (20 overs)
Amy Satterthwaite 56 (46); Holly Huddleston 4/21 (4 overs)		Katie Perkins 35* (35); Gabby Sullivan 4/21 (4 overs)

Canterbury Magicians won by 27 runs
Eden Park Outer Oval, Auckland
Umpires: Billy Bowden and Pete Pasco

- Auckland Hearts won the toss and elected to field.
- Points: Canterbury Magicians 4, Auckland Hearts 0

13 January 2023
Scorecard

Northern Brave; 101/9 (20 overs)	v	Canterbury Magicians; 102/4 (20 overs)
Bernadine Bezuidenhout 30 (23); Sarah Asmussen 3/16 (4 overs)		Kate Anderson 35 (42); Nensi Patel 2/8 (4 overs)

Canterbury Magicians won by 6 wickets
Hagley Oval, Christchurch
Umpires: John Dempsey and Kim Cotton

- Northern Brave won the toss and elected to bat.
- Points: Canterbury Magicians 4, Northern Brave 0

14 January 2023
Scorecard

Central Hinds; 113/4 (20 overs)	v	Auckland Hearts; 114/3 (17.3 overs)
Kerry-Anne Tomlinson 40 (38); Amie Hucker 2/20 (4 overs)		Prue Catton 57 (49); Hannah Rowe 2/6 (4 overs)

Auckland Hearts won by 7 wickets
Eden Park Outer Oval, Auckland
Umpires: Chris Brown and Glen Walklin

- Auckland Hearts won the toss and elected to field.
- Points: Auckland Hearts 4, Central Hinds 0

15 January 2023
Scorecard

Otago Sparks; 127/9 (20 overs)	v	Wellington Blaze; 131/2 (18.1 overs)
Suzie Bates 75 (56); Nicole Baird 3/23 (4 overs)		Amelia Kerr 73* (54); Kate Ebrahim 1/20 (3 overs)

Wellington Blaze won 8 wickets
University of Otago Oval, Dunedin
Umpires: Cory Black and Shaun Haig

- Otago Sparks won the toss and elected to bat.
- Points: Wellington Blaze 4, Otago Sparks 0

20 January 2023
Scorecard

Wellington Blaze; 131/6 (20 overs)	v	Auckland Hearts; 105/8 (20 overs)
Rebecca Burns 53 (40); Makayla Templeton 2/20 (4 overs)		Saachi Shahri 39 (36); Nicole Baird 2/11 (3 overs)

Wellington Blaze won by 26 runs
Eden Park Outer Oval, Auckland
Umpires: Chris Brown and Glen Walklin

- Wellington Blaze won the toss and elected to bat.
- Points: Wellington Blaze 4, Auckland Hearts 0

21 January 2023
Scorecard

Central Hinds; 130/9 (20 overs)	v	Otago Sparks; 136/6 (18.4 overs)
Natalie Dodd 59 (46); Emma Black 4/15 (4 overs)		Olivia Gain 43 (34); Flora Devonshire 2/20 (4 overs)

Otago Sparks won by 4 wickets
Saxton Oval, Nelson
Umpires: N Louw and Tim Parlane

- Otago Sparks won the toss and elected to field.
- Points: Otago Sparks 4, Central Hinds 0

22 January 2023
Scorecard

Auckland Hearts; 92 (20 overs)	v	Northern Brave; 89 (18.2 overs)
Amie Hucker 32* (40); Phoebe Graham 3/11 (3 overs)		Samantha Curtis 16 (19); Holly Huddleston 2/10 (4 overs)

Auckland Hearts won by 3 runs
Bay Oval, Mount Maunganui
Umpires: Chris Brown and Christelle High

- Northern Brave won the toss and elected to field.
- Points: Auckland Hearts 4, Northern Brave 0

23 January 2023
Scorecard

Wellington Blaze; 208/4 (20 overs)	v	Canterbury Magicians; 94 (17 overs)
Laura Harris 67* (27); Gabby Sullivan 2/18 (3 overs)		Natalie Cox 45 (34); Caitlin King 3/13 (3 overs)

Wellington Blaze won by 114 runs
Basin Reserve, Wellington
Umpires: Cory Black and Derek Walker

- Canterbury Magicians won the toss and elected to field.
- Points: Wellington Blaze 4, Canterbury Magicians 0

27 January 2023
Scorecard

Canterbury Magicians; 156/4 (20 overs)	v	Central Hinds; 111/4 (18 overs)
Kate Anderson 92* (69); Jess Watkin 2/37 (4 overs)		Natalie Dodd 50 (50); Gabby Sullivan 1/13 (3 overs)

Canterbury Magicians won by 25 runs (DLS method)
Hagley Oval, Christchurch
Umpires: Derek Walker and Kim Cotton

- Central Hinds won the toss and elected to field.
- Central Hinds innings reduced to 18 overs due to rain; target was 137.
- Points: Canterbury Magicians 4, Central Hinds 0

28 January 2023
Scorecard

Northern Brave	v	Wellington Blaze

Match Abandoned
Seddon Park, Hamilton

- No toss.
- No play possible due to rain.

29 January 2023
Scorecard

Central Hinds; 108 (20 overs)	v	Otago Sparks; 111/4 (19.2 overs)
Flora Devonshire 39 (27); Sophie Oldershaw 3/24 (4 overs)		Polly Inglis 30* (35); Priyanaz Chatterji 1/14 (2 overs)

Otago Sparks won by 6 wickets
University of Otago Oval, Dunedin
Umpires: Cory Black and Tim Parlane

- Central Hinds won the toss and elected to bat.
- Points: Otago Sparks 4, Central Hinds 0

30 January 2023
Scorecard

Auckland Hearts	v	Northern Brave

Match Abandoned
Eden Park Outer Oval, Auckland

- No toss.
- Match called off due to the 2023 North Island floods.
- Points: Auckland Hearts 2, Northern Brave 2

3 February 2023
Scorecard

Northern Brave; 38/5 (5 overs)	v	Central Hinds; 39/3 (4.5 overs)
Samantha Curtis 18 (12); Rosemary Mair 2/8 (1 over)		Flora Devonshire 22* (13); Amanda-Jade Wellington 2/5 (1 over)

Central Hinds won by 7 wickets
Seddon Park, Hamilton
Umpires: Billy Bowden and Derek Walker

- Central Hinds won the toss and elected to field.
- Match reduced to 5 overs per side due to rain.
- Points: Central Hinds 4, Northern Brave 0

4 February 2023
Scorecard

Canterbury Magicians; 127/4 (20 overs)	v	Otago Sparks; 128/3 (18 overs)
Kate Anderson 74* (71); Kate Ebrahim 1/21 (3 overs)		Polly Inglis 43 (47); Amy Satterthwaite 1/19 (4 overs)

Otago Sparks won by 7 wickets
Hagley Oval, Christchurch
Umpires: Eugene Sanders and Tim Parlane

- Otago Sparks won the toss and elected to field.

5 February 2023
Scorecard

Auckland Hearts; 131/6 (20 overs)	v	Wellington Blaze; 87 (17.2 overs)
Saachi Shahri 30 (22); Leigh Kasperek 3/22 (4 overs)		Rebecca Burns 35 (36); Josie Penfold 4/23 (4 overs)

Auckland Hearts won by 44 runs
Basin Reserve, Wellington
Umpires: John Dempsey and Wayne Knights

- Auckland Hearts won the toss and elected to bat.
- Points: Auckland Hearts 4, Wellington Blaze 0

6 February 2023
Scorecard

Canterbury Magicians; 166/4 (20 overs)	v	Otago Sparks; 167/6 (19.5 overs)
Amy Satterthwaite 85 (60); Emma Black 1/30 (4 overs)		Polly Inglis 47* (43); Gabby Sullivan 2/22 (4 overs)

Otago Sparks won by 4 wickets
University of Otago Oval, Dunedin
Umpires: Derek Walker and Shaun Haig

- Otago Sparks won the toss and elected to field.
- Points: Otago Sparks 4, Canterbury Magicians 0

=== Finals ===
Elimination Final
9 February 2023
Scorecard

Otago Sparks; 81/9 (13 overs)	v	Canterbury Magicians; 82/3 (12.3 overs)
Polly Inglis 26 (23); Sarah Asmussen 5/17 (3 overs)		Amy Satterthwaite 30* (32); Kirstie Gordon 1/12 (3 overs)

Canterbury Magicians won by 7 wickets (DLS method)
University of Otago Oval, Dunedin
Umpires: Billy Bowden and Wayne Knights

- Canterbury Magicians won the toss and elected to field.
- Match reduced to 13 overs per side due to rain.

Final
11 February 2023
Scorecard

Canterbury Magicians; 145/9 (20 overs)	v	Wellington Blaze; 133 (20 overs)
Kate Anderson 95 (62); Nicole Baird 1/20 (4 overs)		Jess McFadyen 30 (30); Gabby Sullivan 3/29 (4 overs)

Canterbury Magicians won by 12 runs
Hagley Oval, Christchurch
Umpires: Chris Brown and Shaun Haig

- Canterbury Magicians won the toss and elected to bat.

== Statistics ==
=== Most runs ===
Player	Team	Matches	Innings	Runs	Average	HS	100s	50s
Kate Anderson	Canterbury Magicians	12	12	536	59.55	95	0	5
Amy Satterthwaite	Canterbury Magicians	12	11	376	53.71	85	0	4
Natalie Dodd	Northern Brave	10	10	327	36.33	78*	0	4
Suzie Bates	Otago Sparks	6	5	293	73.25	101*	1	2
Rebecca Burns	Wellington Blaze	10	10	281	31.22	53	0	1

Source: ESPN Cricinfo

=== Most wickets ===
Player	Team	Overs	Wickets	Average	BBI	5w
Gabby Sullivan	Canterbury Magicians	44.1	21	12.38	4/21	0
Leigh Kasperek	Wellington Blaze	33.0	15	14.06	3/16	0
Sarah Asmussen	Canterbury Magicians	42.0	15	18.53	5/17	1
Melissa Banks	Canterbury Magicians	44.0	15	22.20	3/20	0
Amy Satterthwaite	Canterbury Magicians	45.0	14	18.92	2/13	0

Source: ESPN Cricinfo
