= 2023–24 Hallyburton Johnstone Shield =

Domestic cricket competition

- Dates: 18 November 2023 – 25 February 2024
- Administrator: New Zealand Cricket
- Cricket format: 50 over
- Tournament format(s): Round robin and final
- Champions: Otago Sparks (4th title)
- Participants: 6
- Matches: 31
- Most runs: Jess McFadyen (390)
- Most wickets: Emma Black (24)

The 2023–24 Hallyburton Johnstone Shield was a 50-over women's cricket competition, the seventh season with the name Hallyburton Johnstone Shield, that took place in New Zealand. It ran from November 2023 to February 2024, with 6 provincial teams taking part. Wellington Blaze were the defending champions. Otago Sparks beat Wellington in a close final, by four wickets and 11 balls to spare, to win the tournament.

The tournament ran alongside the 2023–24 Super Smash.

== Competition format ==
Teams played in a double round-robin in a group of six, therefore playing 10 matches overall. Matches were played using a one day format with 50 overs per side. The top two in the group advanced to the final.

The group worked on a points system with positions being based on the total points. Points were awarded as follows:

Win: 4 points
Tie: 2 points
Loss: 0 points.
Abandoned/No Result: 2 points.
Bonus Point: 1 point awarded for run rate in a match being 1.25x that of opponent.

== Points table ==
Pos	Team	Pld	W	L	T	NR	BP	Pts	NRR
1	Otago Sparks (Q)	10	6	3	0	1	6	32	1.012
2	Wellington Blaze (Q)	10	7	3	0	0	3	31	0.567
3	Auckland Hearts	10	5	4	0	1	2	24	−0.626
4	Central Hinds	10	4	4	0	2	1	21	0.052
5	Northern Districts	10	3	6	0	1	2	16	−0.667
6	Canterbury Magicians	10	2	7	0	1	1	11	−0.352

Source: ESPNCricinfo

advanced to Final

== Fixtures ==
Source: New Zealand Cricket

18 November 2023
Scorecard

Canterbury Magicians; 210/8 (50 overs)	v	Central Hinds; 208/5 (43 overs)
Jodie Dean 49 (68); Hannah Rowe 3/47 (8 overs)		Georgia Atkinson 89 (121); Gabby Sullivan 3/48 (10 overs)

Central Hinds won by 5 wickets (DLS)
Fitzherbert Park, Palmerston North
Umpires: Scott Oliver and SB Martin

- Central Hinds won the toss and elected to field.
- Central Hinds innings reduced to 48 overs due to rain; target was 208.
- Points: Central Hinds 4, Canterbury Magicians 0

18 November 2023
Scorecard

Wellington Blaze; 92 (31.2 overs)	v	Otago Sparks; 93/3 (26.1 overs)
Monique Rees 20 (41); Emma Black 4/12 (10 overs)		Felicity Leydon-Davis 38* (69); Natasha Codyre 2/23 (5 overs)

Otago Sparks won by 7 wickets
Basin Reserve, Wellington
Umpires: Billy Bowden and Glen Walklin

- Otago Sparks won the toss and elected to field.
- Points: Otago Sparks 5, Wellington Blaze 0

18 November 2023
Scorecard

Northern Districts	v	Auckland Hearts

Match Abandoned
Cobham Oval, Whangārei
Umpires: Tina Semmens and Vinit Mahna

- No toss.
- No play possible due to rain.
- Points: Auckland Hearts 2, Northern Districts 2

19 November 2023
Scorecard

Central Hinds; 134 (25 overs)	v	Canterbury Magicians; 23/3 (7 overs)
Mikaela Greig 39 (33); Erin Bermingham 4/31 (5 overs)		Jodie Dean 12* (21); Claudia Green 2/11 (4 overs)

No Result
Fitzherbert Park, Palmerston North
Umpires: SR Oliver and SB Martin

- Canterbury Magicians won the toss and elected to field.
- Match reduced to 28 overs per side due to rain.
- Points: Canterbury Magicians 2, Central Hinds 2

19 November 2023
Scorecard

Wellington Blaze; 168/9 (25 overs)	v	Otago Sparks; 146/8 (25 overs)
Jess McFadyen 68 (65); Emma Black 3/35 (5 overs)		Polly Inglis 48 (47); Xara Jetly 3/25 (5 overs)

Wellington Blaze won by 22 runs
Basin Reserve, Wellington
Umpires: Billy Bowden and Glen Walklin

- Otago Sparks won the toss and elected to field.
- Match reduced to 25 overs per side due to rain.
- Points: Wellington Blaze 4, Otago Sparks 0

19 November 2023
Scorecard

Auckland Hearts; 206 (45.1 overs)	v	Northern Districts; 140/9 (28 overs)
Josie Penfold 58 (82); Lucy Boucher 3/29 (7.1 overs)		Tash Wakelin 59 (65); Rishika Jaswal 2/16 (6 overs)

Auckland Hearts won by 60 runs (DLS)
Cobham Oval, Whangārei
Umpires: Tina Semmens and Vinit Mahna

- Northern Districts won the toss and elected to field.
- Auckland Hearts innings curtailed at 43 overs due to rain.
- Northern Districts innings reduced to 28 overs due to rain; target was 201.
- Points: Auckland Hearts 5, Northern Districts 0

25 November 2023
Scorecard

Otago Sparks; 217 (49.2 overs)	v	Canterbury Magicians; 129 (31.2 overs)
Polly Inglis 73 (110); Lea Tahuhu 3/37 (10 overs)		Frances Mackay 61 (85); Eden Carson 3/17 (8.2 overs)

Otago Sparks won by 88 runs
Rangiora Recreation Ground, Rangiora
Umpires: Derek Walker and Kim Cotton

- Canterbury Magicians won the toss and elected to field.
- Points: Otago Sparks 5, Canterbury Magicians 0

25 November 2023
Scorecard

Central Hinds; 237 (47.1 overs)	v	Auckland Hearts; 240/6 (47.5 overs)
Rosemary Mair 72 (91); Josie Penfold 3/40 (9 overs)		Maddy Green 91* (109); Hannah Rowe 3/50 (10 overs)

Auckland Hearts won by 4 wickets
Eden Park Outer Oval, Auckland
Umpires: Billy Bowden and Christelle High

- Auckland Hearts won the toss and elected to field.
- Points: Auckland Hearts 4, Central Hinds 0

25 November 2023
Scorecard

Wellington Blaze; 316/4 (50 overs)	v	Northern Districts; 171 (41.4 overs)
Georgia Plimmer 147 (139); Nensi Patel 1/38 (10 overs)		Caitlin Gurrey 37 (50); Kate Chandler 4/16 (8 overs)

Wellington Blaze won by 145 runs
Seddon Park, Hamilton
Umpires: Cory Black and Tina Semmens

- Wellington Blaze won the toss and elected to bat.
- Points: Wellington Blaze 5, Northern Districts 0

26 November 2023
Scorecard

Central Hinds; 197 (40.3 overs)	v	Auckland Hearts; 201/6 (37.5 overs)
Mikaela Greig 78 (91); Fran Jonas 4/32 (9.3 overs)		Maddy Green 77* (84); Claudia Green 5/30 (10 overs)

Auckland Hearts won by 4 wickets
Eden Park Outer Oval, Auckland
Umpires: Billy Bowden and Christelle High

- Central Hinds won the toss and elected to bat.
- Points: Auckland Hearts 5, Central Hinds 0

26 November 2023
Scorecard

Otago Sparks; 180 (44.2 overs)	v	Canterbury Magicians; 181/6 (42.1 overs)
Felicity Leydon-Davis 60 (95); Nicola Clayton 3/30 (8.2 overs)		Frances Mackay 50 (61); Eden Carson 3/36 (10 overs)

Canterbury Magicians won by 4 wickets
Rangiora Recreation Ground, Rangiora
Umpires: Derek Walker and Kim Cotton

- Otago Sparks won the toss and elected to bat.
- Points: Canterbury Magicians 4, Otago Sparks 0

26 November 2023
Scorecard

Northern Districts; 245/5 (50 overs)	v	Wellington Blaze; 188 (45.1 overs)
Eimear Richardson 57* (63); Natasha Codyre 2/45 (10)		Kate Chandler 40 (50); Jess Watkin 3/39 (10 overs)

Northern Districts won by 57 runs
Seddon Park, Hamilton
Umpires: Cory Black and Tina Semmens

- Northern Districts won the toss and elected to bat.
- Points: Northern Districts 5, Wellington Blaze 0

9 December 2023
Scorecard

Otago Sparks; 246 (37.5 overs)	v	Central Hinds; 96/0 (23.5 overs)
Saffron Wilson 109 (97); Rosemary Mair 6/41 (9 overs)		Georgia Atkinson 43* (71)

Central Hinds won by 14 runs (DLS)
Queens Park, Invercargill
Umpires: Kannan Jagannathan and Tyron Davies

- Central Hinds won the toss and elected to field.
- Central Hinds innings curtailed at 23.5 overs due to rain; target was 83.
- Rosemary Mair (Central Hinds) took four wickets in four balls.
- Points: Central Hinds 4, Otago Sparks 0

9 December 2023
Scorecard

Wellington Blaze; 247/8 (50 overs)	v	Auckland Hearts; 90 (27.5 overs)
Leigh Kasperek 73 (101); Rishika Jaswal 2/45 (10 overs)		Skye Bowden 39 (66); Leigh Kasperek 2/6 (3 overs)

Wellington Blaze won by 157 runs
Basin Reserve, Wellington
Umpires: Billy Bowden and James Birchall

- Wellington Blaze won the toss and elected to bat.
- Points: Wellington Blaze 5, Auckland Hearts 0

9 December 2023
Scorecard

Canterbury Magicians; 175 (43.3 overs)	v	Northern Districts; 179/8 (42 overs)
Izzy Sharp 45 (55); Jesse Prasad 3/25 (9 overs)		Nensi Patel 46 (56); Nicola Clayton 2/32 (7 overs)

Northern Districts won by 2 wickets
Bay Oval, Mount Maunganui
Umpires: Allen Stanley and BM Davis

- Canterbury Magicians won the toss and elected to bat.
- Points: Northern Districts 4, Canterbury Magicians 0

10 December 2023
Scorecard

Auckland Hearts; 129 (42.2 overs)	v	Wellington Blaze; 132/1 (27.2 overs)
Saachi Shahri 35 (60); Leigh Kasperek 5/16 (10 overs)		Jess McFadyen 54* (83); Anna Browning 1/28 (8.2 overs)

Wellington Blaze won by 9 wickets
Basin Reserve, Wellington
Umpires: Billy Bowden and James Birchall

- Auckland Hearts won the toss and elected to bat.
- Points: Wellington Blaze 5, Auckland Hearts 0

10 December 2023
Scorecard

Otago Sparks	v	Central Hinds

Match Abandoned
Queens Park, Invercargill
Umpires: Kannan Jagannathan and Tyron Davies

- No toss.
- No play possible due to rain.
- Points: Otago Sparks 2, Central Hinds 2

10 December 2023
Scorecard

Northern Districts; 260/8 (50 overs)	v	Canterbury Magicians; 200 (44 overs)
Caitlin Gurrey 86 (115); Yssa Cullen 3/38 (8 overs)		Jacinta Savage 52 (64); Marama Downes 4/34 (7 overs)

Northern Districts won by 60 runs
Bay Oval, Mount Maunganui
Umpires: Allen Stanley and BM Davis

- Northern Districts won the toss and elected to bat.
- Points: Northern Districts 5, Canterbury Magicians 0

3 February 2024
Scorecard

Northern Districts; 188 (44.4 overs)	v	Otago Sparks; 191/5 (38.1 overs)
Jesse Prasad 49* (66); Emma Black 4/21 (10 overs)		Olivia Gain 44* (51); Marama Downes 3/37 (10 overs)

Otago Sparks won by 5 wickets
University of Otago Oval, Dunedin
Umpires: James Blunt and Pete Pasco

- Otago Sparks won the toss and elected to field.
- Points: Otago Sparks 5, Northern Districts 0

3 February 2024
Scorecard

Wellington Blaze; 244/7 (50 overs)	v	Central Hinds; 213/8 (46.4 overs)
Leigh Kasperek 66 (91); Ocean Bartlett 4/33 (10 overs)		Rosemary Mair 42 (58); Jess Kerr 2/44 (9.4 overs)

Wellington Blaze won by 13 runs (DLS)
Basin Reserve, Wellington
Umpires: Christelle High and Tyron Davies

- Central Hinds won the toss and elected to field.
- Central Hinds innings curtailed by rain at 46.4 overs; target was 227.
- Wellington Blaze 4, Central Hinds 0

3 February 2024
Scorecard

Auckland Hearts; 242/7 (41 overs)	v	Canterbury Magicians; 228/8 (41 overs)
Brooke Halliday 108 (109); Jessica Simmons 3/49 (9 overs)		Kate Anderson 82 (85); Molly Penfold 3/40 (8 overs)

Auckland Hearts won by 14 runs
Hagley Oval, Christchurch
Umpires: Derek Walker and Regan Dalley

- Canterbury Magicians won the toss and elected to field.
- Match reduced to 41 overs per side due to rain.
- Points: Auckland Hearts 4, Canterbury Magicians 0

4 February 2024
Scorecard

Northern Districts; 194 (47.3 overs)	v	Otago Sparks; 195/3 (32.2 overs)
Caitlin Gurrey 48 (52); Molly Loe 2/21 (10 overs)		Caitlin Blakely 62 (63); Marina Lamplough 1/11 (1 over)

Otago Sparks won by 7 wickets
University of Otago Oval, Dunedin
Umpires: James Blunt and Pete Pasco

- Northern Districts won the toss and elected to bat.
- Points: Otago Sparks 5, Northern Districts 0

4 February 2024
Scorecard

Canterbury Magicians; 260/8 (50 overs)	v	Auckland Hearts; 261/5 (46.3 overs)
Frances Mackay 71 (108); Fran Jonas 2/39 (10 overs)		Saachi Shahri 75 (61); Frances Mackay 2/44 (10 overs)

Auckland Hearts won by 5 wickets
Hagley Oval, Christchurch
Umpires: Derek Walker and Regan Dalley

- Canterbury Magicians won the toss and elected to bat.
- Points: Auckland Hearts 4, Canterbury Magicians 0

4 February 2024
Scorecard

Wellington Blaze; 271/6 (50 overs)	v	Central Hinds; 247 (48.4 overs)
Jess McFadyen 122* (132); Ocean Bartlett 2/50 (8 overs)		Natalie Dodd 76 (87); Xara Jetly 3/46 (10 overs)

Wellington Blaze won by 24 runs
Basin Reserve, Wellington
Umpires: Christelle High and Tyron Davies

- Wellington Blaze won the toss and elected to bat.
- Points: Wellington Blaze 4, Central Hinds 0

17 February 2024
Scorecard

Wellington Blaze; 105 (28.1 overs)	v	Canterbury Magicians; 86 (36.5 overs)
Natasha Codyre 24 (25); Jessica Simmons 4/31 (10 overs)		Melissa Banks 24 (44); Leigh Kasperek 5/22 (10 overs)

Wellington Blaze won by 19 runs
Basin Reserve, Wellington
Umpires: Damian Morrow and Kiran Challa

- Wellington Blaze won the toss and elected to bat.
- Match reduced to 48 overs per side due to rain.
- Points: Wellington Blaze 4, Canterbury Magicians 0

17 February 2024
Scorecard

Central Hinds; 158 (43.5 overs)	v	Northern Districts; 127 (33.4 overs)
Natalie Dodd 51 (82); Kayley Knight 7/35 (10 overs)		Jesse Prasad 31* (50); Claudia Green 3/44 (9.4 overs)

Central Hinds won by 31 runs
Pukekura Park, New Plymouth
Umpires: Christelle High and Tina Semmens

- Central Hinds won the toss and elected to bat.
- Points: Central Hinds 4, Northern Districts 0

17 February 2024
Scorecard

Auckland Hearts; 125 (32.5 overs)	v	Otago Sparks; 128/6 (35.5 overs)
Brooke Halliday 33 (55); Emma Black 3/31 (8.5 overs)		Polly Inglis 40 (76); Bree Illing 3/35 (8 overs)

Otago Sparks won by 4 wickets
University of Otago Oval, Dunedin
Umpires: Derek Walker and Kannan Jagannathan

- Auckland Hearts won the toss and elected to bat.
- Points: Otago Sparks 5, Auckland Hearts 0

18 February 2024
Scorecard

Auckland Hearts; 144 (40.1 overs)	v	Otago Sparks; 145/4 (33 overs)
Cate Pedersen 38 (66); Emma Black 4/29 (10 overs)		Suzie Bates 63 (68); Molly Penfold 3/31 (7 overs)

Otago Sparks won by 6 wickets
University of Otago Oval, Dunedin
Umpires: Derek Walker and Kannan Jagannathan

- Otago Sparks won the toss and elected to field.
- Points: Otago Sparks 5, Auckland Hearts 0

18 February 2024
Scorecard

Northern Districts; 171 (47.2 overs)	v	Central Hinds; 173/4 (37.2 overs)
Yasmeen Kareem 40 (84); Hannah Rowe 4/17 (8.2 overs)		Thamsyn Newton 67* (88); Kayley Knight 2/31 (4 overs)

Central Hinds won by 6 wickets
Pukekura Park, New Plymouth
Umpires: Christelle High and Tina Semmens

- Northern Districts won the toss and elected to bat.
- Points: Central Hinds 5, Northern Districts 0

18 February 2024
Scorecard

Wellington Blaze; 155 (42.1 overs)	v	Canterbury Magicians; 158/4 (32.3 overs)
Kate Chandler 59 (77); Frances Mackay 4/14 (8.1 overs)		Kate Anderson 71 (84); Leigh Kasperek 2/47 (8 overs)

Canterbury Magicians won by 6 wickets
Basin Reserve, Wellington
Umpires: Damian Morrow and Kiran Challa

- Canterbury Magicians won the toss and elected to field.
- Points: Canterbury Magicians 5, Wellington Blaze 0

== Final ==
25 February 2024
Scorecard

Wellington Blaze; 211/8 (50 overs)	v	Otago Sparks; 212/6 (48.1 overs)
Jess McFadyen 64 (103); Emma Black 3/31 (10 overs)		Caitlin Blakely 50 (74); Xara Jetly 3/29 (10 overs)

Otago Sparks won by 4 wickets
University of Otago Oval, Dunedin
Umpires: Kannan Jagannathan and Tina Semmens

- Otago Sparks won the toss and elected to field.

== Statistics ==
=== Most runs ===
Player	Team	Matches	Innings	Runs	Average	HS	100s	50s
Jess McFadyen	Wellington Blaze	11	11	390	43.33	122*	1	3
Polly Inglis	Otago Sparks	10	10	324	54.00	73	0	2
Felicity Leydon-Davis	Otago Sparks	10	10	310	44.28	60	0	1
Frances Mackay	Canterbury Magicians	10	9	308	38.50	71	0	4
Caitlin Gurrey	Northern Districts	9	9	299	33.22	86	0	1

Source: ESPN Cricinfo

=== Most wickets ===
Player	Team	Overs	Wickets	Average	BBI	5w
Emma Black	Otago Sparks	82.0	24	11.58	4/12	0
Kayley Knight	Northern Districts	53.5	18	15.44	7/35	1
Leigh Kasperek	Wellington Blaze	91.1	18	20.27	5/16	2
Xara Jetly	Wellington Blaze	89.0	17	19.47	3/25	0
Frances Mackay	Canterbury Magicians	76.2	16	17.62	4/14	0

Source: ESPN Cricinfo
