= 2010–11 Action Cricket Cup =

Women's cricket tournament

- Dates: 11 December 2010 – 30 January 2011
- Administrator: New Zealand Cricket
- Cricket format: 50 over
- Tournament format(s): Round robin and final
- Champions: Canterbury Magicians (36th title)
- Participants: 6
- Matches: 16
- Most runs: Frances Mackay (326)
- Most wickets: Sophie Devine (14)

The 2010–11 Action Cricket Cup was a 50-over women's cricket competition that took place in New Zealand. It ran from December 2010 to January 2011, with 6 provincial teams taking part. Canterbury Magicians beat Wellington Blaze in the final to win the competition.

The tournament ran alongside the 2010–11 Action Cricket Twenty20.

== Competition format ==
Teams played in a round-robin in a group of six, therefore playing 5 matches overall. Matches were played using a one day format with 50 overs per side. The top two in the group advanced to the final.

The group worked on a points system with positions being based on the total points. Points were awarded as follows:

Win: 4 points
Tie: 2 points
Loss: 0 points.
Abandoned/No Result: 2 points.
Bonus Point: 1 point awarded for run rate in a match being 1.25x that of opponent.

== Points table ==
Team	Pld	W	L	T	NR	A	BP	Pts	NRR
Wellington Blaze	5	4	1	0	0	0	3	19	1.648
Canterbury Magicians	5	4	1	0	0	0	3	19	0.737
Otago Sparks	5	3	2	0	0	0	2	14	0.262
Northern Spirit	5	1	3	0	0	1	1	7	–0.835
Auckland Hearts	5	1	3	0	0	1	0	6	–0.665
Central Hinds	5	1	4	0	0	0	0	4	–1.634

Source: New Zealand Cricket

Advanced to the Final

== Final ==
30 January 2011
Scorecard

Canterbury Magicians; 188/9 (50 overs)	v	Wellington Blaze; 161 (46.4 overs)
Janet Brehaut 53 (74); Sophie Devine 3/33 (9 overs)		Mindy Hodgson 37 (40); Erin Bermingham 1/26 (10 overs)

Canterbury Magicians won by 27 runs
Village Green, Christchurch
Umpires: David Reid and Phil Jones

- Canterbury Magicians won the toss and elected to bat.

== Statistics ==
=== Most runs ===
Player	Team	Matches	Innings	Runs	Average	HS	100s	50s
Frances Mackay	Canterbury Magicians	6	6	326	65.20	145	2	0
Mandie Godliman	Canterbury Magicians	6	6	273	45.50	139	1	1
Sophie Devine	Wellington Blaze	6	6	255	42.50	92	0	3
Amy Satterthwaite	Canterbury Magicians	6	6	245	40.83	95	0	2
Lucy Doolan	Wellington Blaze	6	6	239	39.83	91	0	2

Source: ESPN Cricinfo

=== Most wickets ===
Player	Team	Overs	Wickets	Average	BBI	5w
Sophie Devine	Wellington Blaze	52.0	14	11.28	4/11	0
Amanda Cooper	Wellington Blaze	36.3	10	13.60	3/31	0
Amy Satterthwaite	Canterbury Magicians	52.4	10	26.80	3/40	0
Emma Campbell	Otago Sparks	24.0	9	10.11	5/8	1
Kate Ebrahim	Central Hinds	36.0	9	15.00	3/33	0

Source: ESPN Cricinfo
