= West Indies women's cricket team in New Zealand in 2013–14 =

	New Zealand	West Indies
- Dates: 20 February – 9 March 2014
Captains	Suzie Bates	Merissa Aguilleira

One Day International series
- Results: New Zealand won the 3-match series 3–0
Most runs	Sara McGlashan (156)	Shemaine Campbelle (83)
Most wickets	Felicity Leydon-Davis (5); Holly Huddleston (5)	Stacy-Ann King (3); Shaquana Quintyne (3)

Twenty20 International series
- Results: New Zealand won the 5-match series 4–0
Most runs	Suzie Bates (158)	Kycia Knight (68)
Most wickets	Suzie Bates (7); Sophie Devine (7)	Shakera Selman (5)

The West Indies women's cricket team toured New Zealand in February and March 2014. They played against New Zealand in three One Day Internationals and five Twenty20 Internationals, losing the ODI series 3–0 and losing the T20I series 4–0. The second T20I was rained off.

== Squads ==
New Zealand	West Indies
Suzie Bates (c); Nicola Browne; Samantha Curtis; Sophie Devine; Maddy Green; Holly Huddleston; Hayley Jensen; Felicity Leydon-Davis; Frances Mackay; Katey Martin (wk); Sara McGlashan; Morna Nielsen; Katie Perkins; Rachel Priest (wk)	Merissa Aguilleira (c) (wk); Shemaine Campbelle; Shanel Daley; Chinelle Henry; Stacy-Ann King; Kycia Knight; Kyshona Knight; Natasha McLean; Anisa Mohammed; Subrina Munroe; Shaquana Quintyne; Shakera Selman; Tremayne Smartt; Stafanie Taylor; Vanessa Watts

== Tour Match: Canterbury v West Indies ==
20 February 2014
Scorecard

West Indies; 218/5 (50 overs)	v	Canterbury; 166/7 (50 overs)
Kycia Knight 64 (114); Hana Mauafu 2/39 (9 overs)		Erin Bermingham 49 (60); Shanel Daley 2/21 (7 overs)

West Indies Women won by 52 runs
Lincoln Green, Lincoln
Umpires: David Reid (NZ) and Kim Cotton (NZ)

- West Indies Women won the toss and elected to bat.

== WODI Series ==
=== 1st ODI ===
22 February 2014
Scorecard

West Indies; 181/8 (50 overs)	v	New Zealand; 184/1 (29.3 overs)
Stafanie Taylor 36 (44); Suzie Bates 2/25 (7 overs)		Suzie Bates 95* (91); Tremayne Smartt 1/43 (8 overs)

New Zealand Women won by 9 wickets
Bert Sutcliffe Oval, Lincoln
Umpires: Gary Baxter (NZ) and Kathy Cross (NZ)

- West Indies Women won the toss and elected to bat.
- Samantha Curtis, Holly Huddleston and Hayley Jensen (NZ) all made their WODI debuts.

=== 2nd ODI ===
24 February 2014
Scorecard

New Zealand; 274/5 (50 overs)	v	West Indies; 180/9 (50 overs)
Sara McGlashan 71 (87); Stacy-Ann King 1/33 (6 overs)		Shemaine Campbelle 45 (62); Holly Huddleston 5/36 (10 overs)

New Zealand Women won by 94 runs
Bert Sutcliffe Oval, Lincoln
Umpires: Barry Frost (NZ) and Kathy Cross (NZ)

- West Indies Women won the toss and elected to field.
- Chinelle Henry (WI) made her WODI debut.

=== 3rd ODI ===
26 February 2014
Scorecard

New Zealand; 221/8 (50 overs)	v	West Indies; 114 (37.2 overs)
Rachel Priest 57 (40); Stacy-Ann King 2/33 (5 overs)		Shemaine Campbelle 22 (36); Felicity Leydon-Davis 5/18 (8.2 overs)

New Zealand Women won by 107 runs
Bert Sutcliffe Oval, Lincoln
Umpires: Barry Frost (NZ) and Kathy Cross (NZ)

- New Zealand Women won the toss and elected to bat.
- Maddy Green, Felicity Leydon-Davis (NZ) and Vanessa Watts (WI) all made their WODI debuts.

== WT20I Series ==
=== 1st T20I ===
1 March 2014
Scorecard

New Zealand; 120/7 (20 overs)	v	West Indies; 88 (18.1 overs)
Sophie Devine 40 (39); Tremayne Smartt 3/17 (4 overs)		Natasha McLean 22 (21); Hayley Jensen 2/11 (4 overs)

New Zealand Women won by 32 runs
Queens Park, Invercargill
Umpires: Gary Baxter (NZ) and Kathy Cross (NZ)

- West Indies Women won the toss and elected to field.
- Hayley Jensen (NZ) and Vanessa Watts (WI) both made their WT20I debuts.

=== 2nd T20I ===
2 March 2014
Scorecard

West Indies; 7/1 (2 overs)	v	New Zealand
Natasha McLean 3 (7)

No result
Queens Park, Invercargill
Umpires: Gary Baxter (NZ) and Wayne Knights (NZ)

- New Zealand Women won the toss and elected to field.
- No further play possible due to rain.
- Samantha Curtis, Holly Huddleston and Felicity Leydon-Davis (NZ) all made their WT20I debuts.

=== 3rd T20I ===
5 March 2014
Scorecard

New Zealand; 133/6 (20 overs)	v	West Indies; 109 (19.5 overs)
Sophie Devine 46 (37); Shakera Selman 3/23 (4 overs)		Shemaine Campbelle 23 (17); Suzie Bates 3/21 (4 overs)

New Zealand Women won by 24 runs
Queens Park, Invercargill
Umpires: Derek Walker (NZ) and Tim Parlane (NZ)

- West Indies Women won the toss and elected to field.

=== 4th T20I ===
8 March 2014
Scorecard

West Indies; 99/7 (20 overs)	v	New Zealand; 103/2 (16.3 overs)
Shemaine Campbelle 29 (32); Morna Nielsen 2/8 (4 overs)		Suzie Bates 50 (49); Anisa Mohammed 1/9 (4 overs)

New Zealand Women won by 8 wickets
Bay Oval, Mount Maunganui
Umpires: Ashley Mehrotra (NZ) and Barry Frost (NZ)

- West Indies Women won the toss and elected to bat.

=== 5th T20I ===
9 March 2014
Scorecard

New Zealand; 124/5 (20 overs)	v	West Indies; 90 (19.4 overs)
Suzie Bates 57 (51); Shanel Daley 2/17 (4 overs)		Kyshona Knight 31 (44); Sophie Devine 3/9 (3.4 overs)

New Zealand Women won by 34 runs
Bay Oval, Mount Maunganui
Umpires: Ashley Mehrotra (NZ) and Barry Frost (NZ)

- New Zealand Women won the toss and elected to bat.
