= 2012–13 New Zealand Women's One-Day Competition =

- Dates: 24 November 2012 – 13 January 2013
- Administrator: New Zealand Cricket
- Cricket format: 50 over
- Tournament format(s): Round robin and final
- Champions: Canterbury Magicians (37th title)
- Participants: 6
- Matches: 31
- Most runs: Suzie Bates (705)
- Most wickets: Lea Tahuhu (17); Suzie Bates (17)

The 2012–13 New Zealand Women's One-Day Competition was a 50-over women's cricket competition that took place in New Zealand. It ran from November 2012 to January 2013, with 6 provincial teams taking part. Canterbury Magicians beat Auckland Hearts in the final to win the competition.

The tournament ran alongside the 2012–13 New Zealand Women's Twenty20 Competition.

== Competition format ==
Teams played in a double round-robin in a group of six, therefore playing 10 matches overall. Matches were played using a one day format with 50 overs per side. The top two in the group advanced to the final.

The group worked on a points system with positions being based on the total points. Points were awarded as follows:

Win: 4 points
Tie: 2 points
Loss: 0 points.
Abandoned/No Result: 2 points.
Bonus Point: 1 point awarded for run rate in a match being 1.25x that of opponent.

== Points table ==
Team	Pld	W	L	T	NR	A	BP	Pts	NRR
Auckland Hearts	10	8	2	0	0	0	3	35	0.456
Canterbury Magicians	10	5	4	0	0	1	5	27	0.487
Wellington Blaze	10	5	4	0	0	1	1	23	–0.341
Otago Sparks	10	4	5	0	1	0	2	20	0.197
Northern Spirit	10	4	5	0	1	0	1	19	–0.074
Central Hinds	10	2	8	0	0	0	1	9	–0.666

Source: ESPN Cricinfo

Advanced to the Final

== Final ==
13 January 2013
Scorecard

Auckland Hearts; 191 (48.3 overs)	v	Canterbury Magicians; 192/9 (50 overs)
Victoria Lind 46 (69); Lea Tahuhu 4/34 (9.3 overs)		Amy Satterthwaite 44 (57); Megan Tremaine 3/33 (8 overs)

Canterbury Magicians won by 1 wicket
Melville Park, Auckland
Umpires: Kathy Cross and Peter Gasston

- Auckland Hearts won the toss and elected to bat.

== Statistics ==
=== Most runs ===
Player	Team	Matches	Innings	Runs	Average	HS	100s	50s
Suzie Bates	Otago Sparks	10	9	705	117.50	164*	3	3
Natalie Dodd	Northern Spirit	10	10	692	173.00	113*	4	2
Amy Satterthwaite	Canterbury Magicians	10	10	455	50.55	87	0	4
Frances Mackay	Canterbury Magicians	10	10	433	43.30	120	2	1
Samantha Curtis	Auckland Hearts	11	11	428	47.55	95*	0	5

Source: ESPN Cricinfo

=== Most wickets ===
Player	Team	Overs	Wickets	Average	BBI	5w
Lea Tahuhu	Canterbury Magicians	60.1	17	11.70	4/19	1
Suzie Bates	Otago Sparks	86.3	17	21.94	4/20	0
Georgia Guy	Auckland Hearts	85.0	16	17.75	5/19	1
Emma Campbell	Otago Sparks	88.0	16	19.31	4/30	0
Kate Ebrahim	Central Hinds	81.1	15	17.53	4/23	0

Source: ESPN Cricinfo
