= England women's cricket team in New Zealand in 2011–12 =

| | New Zealand women | England women |
- Dates: 11 February 2012 – 5 March 2012
| Captains | Suzie Bates | Charlotte Edwards |

One Day International series
- Results: England women won the 3-match series 3–0
| Most runs | Amy Satterthwaite (265) | Charlotte Edwards (230) |
| Most wickets | Rachel Candy (5) | Laura Marsh (6) |
- Player of the series: Anya Shrubsole (ENG)

Twenty20 International series
- Results: England women won the 5-match series 4–0
| Most runs | Suzie Bates and Sara McGlashan (86) | Sarah Taylor (104) |
| Most wickets | Morna Nielsen (5) | Anya Shrubsole (10) |

The England women's cricket team played the New Zealand women's cricket team in February–March 2012. The tour consisted of five Women's Twenty20 Internationals (WT20I) followed by three Women's One Day Internationals (WODIs). Ahead of the WT20I fixtures, England Women played 3 warm-up matches (one 50-overs match and two 20-overs match) against New Zealand Emerging Players Women team, with all three matches taking place in Lincoln.

== Squads ==
| WODIs | | WT20Is | |
| New Zealand | England | New Zealand | England |
|---|---|---|---|
| Suzie Bates (c); Sara McGlashan; Amy Satterthwaite; Liz Perry; Katey Martin (wk); Kate Ebrahim; Morna Nielsen; Lea Tahuhu; Rachel Candy; Lucy Doolan; Anna Peterson; Sian Ruck | Charlotte Edwards (c); Laura Marsh; Sarah Taylor (wk); Lydia Greenway; Arran Brindle; Tammy Beaumont; Jenny Gunn; Anya Shrubsole; Danielle Hazell; Georgia Elwiss; Heather Knight; Danielle Wyatt | Suzie Bates (c); Sara McGlashan; Amy Satterthwaite; Liz Perry; Frances Mackay; Katey Martin (wk); Kate Ebrahim; Morna Nielsen; Lea Tahuhu; Sian Ruck; Rachel Candy; Lucy Doolan; Anna Peterson | Charlotte Edwards (c); Laura Marsh; Sarah Taylor (wk); Lydia Greenway; Arran Brindle; Tammy Beaumont; Jenny Gunn; Danielle Wyatt; Anya Shrubsole; Danielle Hazell; Susie Rowe; Georgia Elwiss; Isa Guha; Heather Knight; Beth Morgan |

== Tour matches ==
=== 50-over match: New Zealand Emerging Players Women v England Women ===
11 February 2012
10:30
Scorecard

| England; 292/9 (50 overs) | v | New Zealand Emerging Players Women; 111 (49.2 overs) |
| Charlotte Edwards 123 (104); Deanna Doughty 3/49 (8 overs) | | Anna Peterson 42 (59); Anya Shrubsole 5/5 (5.1 overs) |

England Women won by 181 runs
Bert Sutcliffe Oval, Lincoln
Umpires: Kathy Cross (NZ) and Mark Eliott (NZ)

- England Women won the toss and elected to bat.
- 12 players per side (11 batting, 11 fielding).

=== 1st 20-over match: New Zealand Emerging Players Women v England Women ===
13 February 2012
14:00
Scorecard

| New Zealand Emerging Players Women; 86/6 (20 overs) | v | England; 87/2 (12.4 overs) |
| Victoria Abott 27 (28); Laura Marsh 2/11 (4 overs) | | Sarah Taylor 43 (24); Georgia Guy 2/14 (3 overs) |

England Women won by 8 wickets
Bert Sutcliffe Oval, Lincoln
Umpires: Kathy Cross (NZ) and Mark Eliott (NZ)

- New Zealand Emerging Players Women won the toss and elected to bat.
- 12 players per side (11 batting, 11 fielding).

=== 2nd 20-over match: New Zealand Emerging Players Women v England Women ===
14 February 2012
14:00
Scorecard

| England; 140/8 (20 overs) | v | New Zealand Emerging Players Women; 86/5 (20 overs) |
| Lydia Greenway 46 (40); Maneka Singh 2/0 (1 over) | | Anna Peterson 41 (43); Jenny Gunn 2/23 (4 overs) |

England Women won by 54 runs
Bert Sutcliffe Oval, Lincoln
Umpires: Kathy Cross (NZ) and Mark Eliott (NZ)

- New Zealand Emerging Players Women won the toss and elected to field.
- 12 players per side (11 batting, 11 fielding).

== WT20I series ==
=== 1st WT20I ===
17 February 2012
14:45
Scorecard

| New Zealand; 80/9 (20 overs) | v | England; 81/4 (17.4 overs) |
| Kate Ebrahim 27 (34); Anya Shrubsole 5/11 (4 overs) | | Sarah Taylor 31 (34); Sian Ruck 2/15 (4 overs) |

England Women won by 6 wicket
Westpac Stadium, Wellington
Umpires: Chris Gaffaney (NZ) and Phil Jones (NZ)
Player of the match: Anya Shrubsole (ENG)

- England Women won the toss and elected to field.

=== 2nd WT20I ===
19 February 2012
14:45
Scorecard

| England; 166/7 (20 overs) | v | New Zealand; 118 (19.2 overs) |
| Laura Marsh 48 (29); Lucy Doolan 2/30 (4 overs) | | Suzie Bates 37 (38); Danielle Wyatt 3/24 (4 overs) |

England Women won by 48 runs
Seddon Park, Hamilton
Umpires: Barry Frost (NZ) and Phil Jones (NZ)
Player of the match: Laura Marsh (ENG)

- New Zealand Women won the toss and elected to field.

=== 3rd WT20I ===
22 February 2012
14:45
Scorecard

| England; 108/6 (20 overs) | v | New Zealand; 90/7 (18.5 overs) |
| Jenny Gunn 30 (26); Rachel Candy 1/14 (4 overs) | | Sara McGlashan 20 (28); Danielle Hazell 2/22 (3.5 overs) |

England Women won by 10 runs (DLS method)
Eden Park, Auckland
Umpires: Barry Frost (NZ) and Derek Walker (NZ)
Player of the match: Jenny Gunn (ENG)

- New Zealand Women won the toss and elected to field.
- New Zealand Women were set a revised target of 101 run from 18.5 overs due to rain.

=== 4th WT20I ===
25 February 2012
14:00
Scorecard

| England | v | New Zealand |

Match abandoned
Queens Park, Invercargill
Umpires: Barry Frost (NZ) and Tim Parlane (NZ)

- No toss.
- No play was possible due to rain.

=== 5th WT20I ===
26 February 2012
14:00
Scorecard

| New Zealand; 109/6 (20 overs) | v | England; 110/5 (18.5 overs) |
| Sara McGlashan 29 (37); Anya Shrubsole 2/7 (4 overs) | | Sarah Taylor 24 (17); Morna Nielsen 4/10 (4 overs) |

England Women won by 5 wickets
Queens Park, Invercargill
Umpires: Barry Frost (NZ) and Tim Parlane (NZ)
Player of the match: Anya Shrubsole (ENG)

- England Women won the toss and elected to field.

== WODI series ==
=== 1st WODI ===
1 March 2012
10:30
Scorecard

| New Zealand; 233/6 (50 overs) | v | England; 234/5 (48.2 overs) |
| Sara McGlashan 74 (104); Jenny Gunn 2/30 (9 overs) | | Charlotte Edwards 84 (107); Suzie Bates 2/34 (8 overs) |

England Women won by 5 wicket
Bert Sutcliffe Oval, Lincoln
Umpires: Phil Jones (NZ) and Derek Walker (NZ)
Player of the match: Laura Marsh (ENG)

- England Women won the toss and elected to field.
- Anna Peterson (NZ) made her ODI debut.

=== 2nd WODI ===
3 March 2012
10:30
Scorecard

| England; 219/6 (26 overs) | v | New Zealand; 164 (26 overs) |
| Charlotte Edwards 137* (88); Kate Ebrahim 2/32 (4 overs) | | Amy Satterthwaite 69 (56); Anya Shrubsole 3/28 (5 overs) |

England Women won by 55 runs
Bert Sutcliffe Oval, Lincoln
Umpires: Kathy Cross (NZ) and Derek Walker (NZ)
Player of the match: Charlotte Edwards (ENG)

- New Zealand Women won the toss and elected to field.
- Match has been reduced to 26 overs per side due to rain.

=== 3rd WODI ===
5 March 2012
10:30
Scorecard

| New Zealand; 220 (48.4 overs) | v | England; 222/4 (42.4 overs) |
| Amy Satterthwaite 58 (69); Laura Marsh 3/28 (10 overs) | | Sarah Taylor 109* (113); Rachel Candy 2/35 (8 overs) |

England Women won by 6 wickets
Bert Sutcliffe Oval, Lincoln
Umpires: Gary Baxter (NZ) and Wayne Knights (NZ)
Player of the match: Sarah Taylor (ENG)

- New Zealand Women won the toss and elected to bat.
