= 2010–11 Rose Bowl series =

2010–11 Rose Bowl
	New Zealand	Australia
- Dates: 28 December 2010 – 16 June 2011
Captains	Aimee Watkins	Jodie Fields

One Day International series
- Results: Australia won the 3-match series 2–0
Most runs	Nicola Browne (69)	Leah Poulton (92)
Most wickets	Kate Ebrahim (4)	Lisa Sthalekar (6)

Twenty20 International series
- Results: 5-match series drawn 2–2
Most runs	Sara McGlashan (184)	Leah Poulton (101)
Most wickets	Suzie Bates (6); Nicola Browne (6)	Clea Smith (5); Shelley Nitschke (5)

The 2010–11 Rose Bowl series was a women's cricket series originally scheduled to be held in New Zealand in December 2010 and February 2011. New Zealand and Australia first played each other in five Twenty20 Internationals, with series drawn 2–2. Three One Day Internationals were then scheduled to be played, but were cancelled due to the 2011 Christchurch earthquake. The three matches were eventually played in June 2011 in Brisbane, with Australia winning the series 2–0.

== Squads ==
Australia	New Zealand
Jodie Fields (c) (wk); Alex Blackwell; Sarah Coyte; Jess Duffin; Rene Farrell; Rachael Haynes; Alyssa Healy (wk); Jess Jonassen; Meg Lanning; Annie Maloney; Sharon Millanta; Shelley Nitschke; Erin Osborne; Leah Poulton; Clea Smith; Lisa Sthalekar	Aimee Watkins (c); Kelly Anderson; Suzie Bates; Erin Bermingham; Nicola Browne; Lucy Doolan; Kate Ebrahim; Frances Mackay; Katey Martin (wk); Sara McGlashan; Liz Perry; Rachel Priest; Amy Satterthwaite; Sian Ruck; Lea Tahuhu; Sarah Tsukigawa

== WT20I Series ==
=== 1st T20I ===
28 December 2010
Scorecard

New Zealand	v	Australia

Match Abandoned
Seddon Park, Hamilton
Umpires: Barry Frost (NZ) and Evan Gray (NZ)

- No toss.
- No play possible due to rain.

=== 2nd T20I ===
30 December 2010
Scorecard

New Zealand; 122/9 (20 overs)	v	Australia; 123/6 (19.4 overs)
Sara McGlashan 48 (38); Sarah Coyte 2/18 (4 overs)		Alyssa Healy 28* (20); Nicola Browne 2/21 (4 overs)

Australia Women won by 4 wickets
Saxton Oval, Nelson
Umpires: Dave Paterson (NZ) and Wayne Knights (NZ)
Player of the match: Sarah Coyte (Aus)

- New Zealand Women won the toss and elected to bat.
- Sarah Coyte and Meg Lanning (Aus) both made their WT20I debuts.

=== 3rd T20I ===
18 February 2011
Scorecard

New Zealand; 138/6 (20 overs)	v	Australia; 119 (19 overs)
Sara McGlashan 43* (29); Shelley Nitschke 1/11 (4 overs)		Leah Poulton 27 (19); Kate Ebrahim 3/15 (3 overs)

New Zealand Women won by 19 runs
Queens Park, Invercargill
Umpires: Dave Paterson (NZ) and Derek Walker (NZ)

- New Zealand Women won the toss and elected to bat.

=== 4th T20I ===
19 February 2011
Scorecard

New Zealand; 147/5 (20 overs)	v	Australia; 133/6 (20 overs)
Sara McGlashan 62 (50); Lisa Sthalekar 1/23 (4 overs)		Meg Lanning 33 (28); Kate Ebrahim 2/19 (3 overs)

New Zealand Women won by 14 runs
Queens Park, Invercargill
Umpires: Dave Paterson (NZ) and Derek Walker (NZ)

- New Zealand Women won the toss and elected to bat.

=== 5th T20I ===
20 February 2011
Scorecard

Australia; 166/9 (20 overs)	v	New Zealand; 163/7 (20 overs)
Leah Poulton 50 (31); Suzie Bates 4/26 (3 overs)		Amy Satterthwaite 40 (31); Clea Smith 3/23 (4 overs)

New Zealand Women won by 14 runs
Queens Park, Invercargill
Umpires: Dave Paterson (NZ) and Derek Walker (NZ)

- Australia Women won the toss and elected to bat.

== WODI Series ==
=== 1st ODI ===
12 June 2011
Scorecard

Australia	v	New Zealand

Match Abandoned
Allan Border Field, Brisbane
Umpires: Damien Mealey (Aus) and Paul Reiffel (NZ)

- No toss.
- No play possible due to rain.

=== 2nd ODI ===
14 June 2011
Scorecard

New Zealand; 181 (48.5 overs)	v	Australia; 182/4 (31.3 overs)
Frances Mackay 36 (77); Clea Smith 4/32 (9.5 overs)		Leah Poulton 54 (58); Kate Ebrahim 2/23 (3.3 overs)

Australia Women won by 6 wickets
Allan Border Field, Brisbane
Umpires: Bruce Oxenford (Aus) and Paul Reiffel (Aus)
Player of the match: Shelley Nitschke (Aus)

- Australia Women won the toss and elected to field.
- Sharon Millanta (Aus), Kelly Anderson, Frances Mackay and Lea Tahuhu (NZ) all made their WODI debuts.

=== 3rd ODI ===
16 June 2011
Scorecard

Australia; 222 (48.3 overs)	v	New Zealand; 203 (46.1 overs)
Alex Blackwell 51 (69); Kelly Anderson 3/45 (10 overs)		Nicola Browne 54* (64); Lisa Sthalekar 3/28 (7.1 overs)

Australia Women won by 19 runs
Allan Border Field, Brisbane
Umpires: Bruce Oxenford (Aus) and Damien Mealey (Aus)
Player of the match: Nicola Browne (NZ)

- New Zealand Women won the toss and elected to field.
