= 2015–16 New Zealand Women's Twenty20 Competition =

- Dates: 27 November 2015 – 14 February 2016
- Administrator: New Zealand Cricket
- Cricket format: Twenty20
- Tournament format(s): Round robin and final
- Champions: Canterbury Magicians (4th title)
- Participants: 6
- Matches: 16
- Most runs: Frances Mackay (190)
- Most wickets: Deanna Doughty (7); Frances Mackay (7); Anna Peterson (7); Amy Satterthwaite (7); Lea Tahuhu (7)

The 2015–16 New Zealand Women's Twenty20 Competition was the ninth season of the women's Twenty20 cricket competition played in New Zealand. It ran from November 2015 to February 2016, with 6 provincial teams taking part. Canterbury Magicians beat Central Hinds in the final to win the tournament, their fourth Twenty20 title.

The tournament ran alongside the 2015–16 New Zealand Women's One-Day Competition.

== Competition format ==
Teams played in a round-robin in a group of six, playing 5 matches overall. Matches were played using a Twenty20 format. The top two in the group advanced to the final.

The group worked on a points system with positions being based on the total points. Points were awarded as follows:

Win: 4 points
Tie: 2 points
Loss: 0 points.
Abandoned/No Result: 2 points.

== Points table ==
Team	Pld	W	L	T	NR	Pts	NRR
Canterbury Magicians	5	4	0	0	1	18	1.051
Central Hinds	5	2	2	0	1	10	–0.061
Wellington Blaze	5	2	2	0	1	10	–0.071
Otago Sparks	5	2	3	0	0	8	–0.127
Northern Spirit	5	1	2	0	2	8	–1.273
Auckland Hearts	5	1	3	0	1	6	0.207

Source: ESPN Cricinfo

Advanced to the Final

== Final ==
14 February 2016
Scorecard

Central Hinds; 92/9 (20 overs)	v	Canterbury Magicians; 93/3 (17 overs)
Kate Ebrahim 42 (50); Amy Satterthwaite 3/11 (4 overs)		Amy Satterthwaite 49 (44); Mikaela Greig 2/10 (3 overs)

Canterbury Magicians won by 7 wickets
MainPower Oval, Rangiora
Umpires: Kathy Cross and Shaun Haig

- Central Hinds won the toss and elected to bat.

== Statistics ==
=== Most runs ===
Player	Team	Matches	Innings	Runs	Average	HS	100s	50s
Frances Mackay	Canterbury Magicians	5	5	190	63.33	64	0	2
Kate Ebrahim	Central Hinds	6	6	181	45.25	73*	0	1
Sophie Devine	Wellington Blaze	4	3	166	83.00	106*	1	0
Michelle Mitchell	Central Hinds	6	6	150	30.00	67	0	1
Suzie Bates	Otago Sparks	5	5	146	29.20	52	0	1

Source: ESPN Cricinfo

=== Most wickets ===
Player	Team	Overs	Wickets	Average	BBI	5w
Deanna Doughty	Wellington Blaze	19.0	7	10.85	3/11	0
Frances Mackay	Canterbury Magicians	20.0	7	13.85	2/18	0
Anna Peterson	Auckland Hearts	12.2	7	14.14	4/11	0
Amy Satterthwaite	Canterbury Magicians	17.0	7	15.00	3/11	0
Lea Tahuhu	Canterbury Magicians	19.3	7	15.42	3/15	0

Source: ESPN Cricinfo
