= Australia women's cricket team in New Zealand in 2015–16 =

International cricket tour

Australia women's tour of New Zealand
	New Zealand women	Australia women
- Dates: 20 February – 4 March
Captains	Suzie Bates	Meg Lanning

One Day International series
- Results: Australia women won the 3-match series 2–1
Most runs	Suzie Bates (214)	Meg Lanning (246)
Most wickets	Lea Tahuhu (4); Erin Bermingham (4)	Jess Jonassen (9)

Twenty20 International series
- Results: New Zealand women won the 3-match series 2–1
Most runs	Suzie Bates (141)	Ellyse Perry (115)
Most wickets	Leigh Kasperek (7)	Megan Schutt (4)

The Australian women's cricket team toured New Zealand in February 2016. The tour included a series of three WODIs and three WT20Is. The WODIs were part of both the Rose Bowl series and 2014–16 ICC Women's Championship. Australia won the ODI series by 2–1 and New Zealand took the T20I series by 2–1.

== Squads ==
ODIs		T20Is	
New Zealand	Australia	New Zealand	Australia
Suzie Bates (c); Sophie Devine (vc); Erin Bermingham; Leigh Kasperek; Katey Martin (wk); Sara McGlashan (wk); Thamsyn Newton; Morna Nielsen; Katie Perkins; Rachel Priest (wk); Hannah Rowe; Amy Satterthwaite; Lea Tahuhu	Meg Lanning (c); Alex Blackwell (vc); Kristen Beams; Nicole Bolton; Sarah Coyte; Rene Farrell; Holly Ferling; Grace Harris; Alyssa Healy (wk); Jess Jonassen; Beth Mooney; Ellyse Perry; Megan Schutt	Suzie Bates (c); Sophie Devine (vc); Erin Bermingham; Leigh Kasperek; Felicity Leydon-Davis; Katey Martin (wk); Sara McGlashan (wk); Thamsyn Newton; Morna Nielsen; Katie Perkins; Anna Peterson; Rachel Priest (wk); Hannah Rowe; Amy Satterthwaite; Lea Tahuhu	Meg Lanning (c); Alex Blackwell (vc); Kristen Beams; Lauren Cheatle; Sarah Coyte; Rene Farrell; Holly Ferling; Grace Harris; Alyssa Healy (wk); Jess Jonassen; Beth Mooney; Erin Osborne; Ellyse Perry; Megan Schutt; Elyse Villani

== ODI series ==
The three match series is part of both Rose Bowl series and 2014–16 ICC Women's Championship.

=== 1st ODI ===
ICC Women's Championship
20 February
10:30 NZDT (UTC+13)
Scorecard

New Zealand; 202/9 (50 overs)	v	Australia; 193 (49.4 overs)
Amy Satterthwaite 72 (88); Grace Harris 3/32 (10 overs); Jess Jonassen 3/32 (10 overs)		Beth Mooney 53 (77); Lea Tahuhu 3/34 (9 overs)

New Zealand won by 9 runs
Bay Oval, Mount Maunganui
Umpires: Kathy Cross (NZ) and Tony Gillies (NZ)
Player of the match: Amy Satterthwaite (NZ)

- Australia Women won the toss and elected to field.
- Beth Mooney (Aus) and Thamsyn Newton (NZ) made their ODI debut.
- ICC Women's Championship points: New Zealand Women 2, Australia Women 0

=== 2nd ODI ===
ICC Women's Championship
22 February
10:30 NZDT (UTC+13)
Scorecard

New Zealand; 206/9 (50 overs)	v	Australia; 210/2 (41 overs)
Sophie Devine 67 (102); Jess Jonassen 5/50 (9 overs)		Meg Lanning 114* (113); Lea Tahuhu 1/35 (8 overs)

Australia Women won by 8 wickets
Bay Oval, Mount Maunganui
Umpires: Kathy Cross (NZ) and Tony Gillies (NZ)
Player of the match: Meg Lanning (Aus)

- Australia Women won the toss and elected to field.
- ICC Women's Championship points: New Zealand Women 0, Australia Women 2

=== 3rd ODI ===
ICC Women's Championship
24 February
10:30 NZDT (UTC+13)
Scorecard

New Zealand; 243/5 (50 overs)	v	Australia; 244/4 (48.4 overs)
Suzie Bates 110 (133); Jess Jonassen 1/25 (6 overs)		Meg Lanning 127 (135); Leigh Kasperek 2/37 (6.4 overs)

Australia Women won by 6 wickets
Bay Oval, Mount Maunganui
Umpires: Kathy Cross (NZ) and Ashley Mehrotra (NZ)

- Australia Women won the toss and elected to field.
- Amy Satterthwaite (NZ) and Meg Lanning (Aus) scored 2,000 ODI career runs.
- ICC Women's Championship points: New Zealand Women 0, Australia Women 2

== T20I series ==
=== 1st T20I ===
28 February
14:00 NZDT (UTC+13)
Scorecard
NZ Cricket scorecard

Australia; 113/7 (20 overs)	v	New Zealand; 114/6 (18.3 overs)
Meg Lanning 30 (28); Leigh Kasperek 4/7 (3 overs)		Suzie Bates 33 (32); Megan Schutt 2/11 (4 overs)

New Zealand Women won by 4 wickets
Basin Reserve, Wellington
Umpires: Kathy Cross (NZ) and John Bromley (NZ)

- New Zealand Women won the toss and elected to field.

=== 2nd T20I ===
1 March
16:00 NZDT (UTC+13)
Scorecard

Australia; 116/6 (20 overs)	v	New Zealand; 117/5 (19.3 overs)
Ellyse Perry 55* (47); Leigh Kasperek 3/26 (4 overs)		Suzie Bates 54 (53); Meg Lanning 2/17 (2 overs)

New Zealand Women won by 5 wickets
Basin Reserve, Wellington
Umpires: Chris Brown (NZ) and Kathy Cross (NZ)

- New Zealand Women won the toss and elected to field.

=== 3rd T20I ===
4 March
16:00 NZDT (UTC+13)
Scorecard
NZ Cricket scorecard

Australia; 145/7 (20 overs)	v	New Zealand; 128/8 (20 overs)
Ellyse Perry 43 (43); Thamsyn Newton 2/16 (2 overs)		Suzie Bates 54 (43); Ellyse Perry 2/15 (4 overs)

Australia Women won by 17 runs
Pukekura Park, New Plymouth
Umpires: Chris Brown (NZ) and Ashley Mehrotra (NZ)

- New Zealand Women won the toss and elected to field.
