= 2012–13 New Zealand Women's Twenty20 Competition =

- Dates: 23 November 2012 – 12 January 2013
- Administrator: New Zealand Cricket
- Cricket format: Twenty20
- Tournament format(s): Round robin and final
- Champions: Wellington Blaze (2nd title)
- Participants: 6
- Matches: 16
- Most runs: Sophie Devine (191)
- Most wickets: Brooke Kirkbride (9)

The 2012–13 New Zealand Women's Twenty20 Competition was the sixth season of the women's Twenty20 cricket competition played in New Zealand. It ran from November 2012 to January 2013, with 6 provincial teams taking part. Wellington Blaze beat Canterbury Magicians in the final to win the tournament, their second Twenty20 title.

The tournament ran alongside the 2012–13 New Zealand Women's One-Day Competition.

== Competition format ==
Teams played in a round-robin in a group of six, playing 5 matches overall. Matches were played using a Twenty20 format. The top two in the group advanced to the final.

The group worked on a points system with positions being based on the total points. Points were awarded as follows:

Win: 4 points
Tie: 2 points
Loss: 0 points.
Abandoned/No Result: 2 points.

== Points table ==
Team	Pld	W	L	T	NR	Pts	NRR
Canterbury Magicians	5	5	0	0	0	20	1.024
Wellington Blaze	5	3	2	0	0	12	0.636
Otago Sparks	5	3	2	0	0	12	0.024
Auckland Hearts	5	2	3	0	0	8	–0.092
Northern Spirit	5	1	4	0	0	4	–0.514
Central Hinds	5	1	4	0	0	4	–0.904

Source: ESPN Cricinfo

Advanced to the Final

== Final ==
12 January 2013
Scorecard

Wellington Blaze; 155/2 (20 overs)	v	Canterbury Magicians; 117/9 (20 overs)
Sophie Devine 83* (54); Erin Bermingham 1/24 (4 overs)		Erin Bermingham 28 (22); Lucy Doolan 2/18 (4 overs)

Wellington Blaze won by 38 runs
MainPower Oval, Rangiora
Umpires: Garth Stirrat and Kathy Cross

- Wellington Blaze won the toss and elected to bat.

== Statistics ==
=== Most runs ===
Player	Team	Matches	Innings	Runs	Average	HS	100s	50s
Sophie Devine	Wellington Blaze	4	4	191	95.50	83*	0	2
Sarah Tsukigawa	Otago Sparks	5	5	142	47.33	66*	0	1
Lauren Ebsary	Wellington Blaze	3	3	141	141.00	58*	0	1
Nicola Browne	Northern Spirit	5	5	134	44.66	33	0	0
Sara McGlashan	Central Hinds	5	5	124	24.80	45	0	0

Source: ESPN Cricinfo

=== Most wickets ===
Player	Team	Overs	Wickets	Average	BBI	5w
Brooke Kirkbride	Northern Spirit	19.0	9	10.77	3/18	0
Erin Bermingham	Canterbury Magicians	23.0	7	14.28	2/15	0
Lea Tahuhu	Canterbury Magicians	15.0	6	12.66	2/11	0
Sarah Tsukigawa	Otago Sparks	20.0	6	16.66	4/33	0
Frances Mackay	Canterbury Magicians	23.0	6	19.16	2/11	0

Source: ESPN Cricinfo
