= Australia women's cricket team in New Zealand in 2020–21 =

International cricket tour

	New Zealand women	Australia women
- Dates: 28 March – 10 April 2021
Captains	Sophie Devine (WT20Is) (Note: Amy Satterthwaite captained New Zealand Women for the second and third WT20Is.); Amy Satterthwaite (WODIs)	Meg Lanning

One Day International series
- Results: Australia women won the 3-match series 3–0
Most runs	Lauren Down (106)	Alyssa Healy (155)
Most wickets	Leigh Kasperek (9)	Megan Schutt (7)
- Player of the series: Megan Schutt (Aus)

Twenty20 International series
- Results: 3-match series drawn 1–1
Most runs	Amelia Kerr (56)	Ashleigh Gardner (76)
Most wickets	Frances Mackay (3); Jess Kerr (3)	Jess Jonassen (3); Megan Schutt (3)

The Australia women's cricket team played against New Zealand women's cricket team in March and April 2021. The tour took place during the time that was originally scheduled to be used to host the 2021 Women's Cricket World Cup. However, the tournament was postponed by one year due to the COVID-19 pandemic. The fixtures for the tour were confirmed in January 2021, with three Women's Twenty20 International (WT20I) and three Women's One Day International (WODI) being played. The WT20I matches were played as double-headers alongside the men's fixtures between New Zealand and Bangladesh.

Australia won the first WT20I by six wickets, with New Zealand winning the second match by four wickets to level the series. Only 2.5 overs of play was possible in the third WT20I, with the series being drawn 1–1.

Australia won the first WODI by six wickets, setting a new record of twenty-two consecutive wins in ODI cricket. This broke the previous record of twenty-one wins set by Ricky Ponting's team of 2002–03. Australia won the second WODI by 71 runs, winning the series and retaining the Rose Bowl. Australia won the third WODI by 21 runs to win the series 3–0.

== Squads ==
WODIs		WT20Is	
New Zealand	Australia	New Zealand	Australia
Amy Satterthwaite (c); ~~Sophie Devine (c)~~; Kate Anderson; Lauren Down; Maddy Green; Brooke Halliday; Hayley Jensen; Leigh Kasperek; Amelia Kerr; Jess Kerr; ~~Frances Mackay~~; Rosemary Mair; Katey Martin (wk); Hannah Rowe; Lea Tahuhu	Meg Lanning (c); Rachael Haynes (vc); Darcie Brown; Nicola Carey; Hannah Darlington; Ashleigh Gardner; Alyssa Healy (wk); Jess Jonassen; Tahlia McGrath; Sophie Molineux; Beth Mooney; Ellyse Perry; Megan Schutt; Molly Strano; ~~Annabel Sutherland~~; Belinda Vakarewa; Tayla Vlaeminck; Georgia Wareham	Sophie Devine (c); Amy Satterthwaite (vc); Lauren Down; Maddy Green; Brooke Halliday; Hayley Jensen; Fran Jonas; Amelia Kerr; Jess Kerr; Rosemary Mair; Frances Mackay; Katey Martin (wk); Thamsyn Newton; Molly Penfold; Hannah Rowe	Meg Lanning (c); Rachael Haynes (vc); Darcie Brown; Nicola Carey; Hannah Darlington; Ashleigh Gardner; Alyssa Healy (wk); Jess Jonassen; Tahlia McGrath; Sophie Molineux; Beth Mooney; Ellyse Perry; Megan Schutt; Molly Strano; ~~Annabel Sutherland~~; Belinda Vakarewa; Tayla Vlaeminck; Georgia Wareham

Annabel Sutherland was ruled out of Australia's squad due to injury, with Molly Strano named as her replacement. Sophie Devine was ruled out of the last two WT20Is with Amy Satterthwaite captaining the New Zealand in her place. Molly Penfold was added to New Zealand's squad for third WT20I. Frances Mackay was also ruled out the third WT20I and WODI series with Lauren Down added as cover in the third WT20I. Sophie Devine was also ruled out of the WODI series, with Amy Satterthwaite again named captain of New Zealand in her absence. Kate Anderson was named as Devine's replacement for the WODI matches.

== WT20I series ==
=== 1st WT20I ===
28 March 2021
19:10 (N)
Scorecard

New Zealand; 130/6 (20 overs)	v	Australia; 133/4 (18 overs)
Amy Satterthwaite 40 (31); Jess Jonassen 3/26 (4 overs)		Ashleigh Gardner 73* (48); Jess Kerr 2/17 (4 overs)

Australia Women won by 6 wickets
Seddon Park, Hamilton
Umpires: Kim Cotton (NZ) and John Dempsey (NZ)
Player of the match: Ashleigh Gardner (Aus)

- Australia Women won the toss and elected to field.

=== 2nd WT20I ===
30 March 2021
15:00
Scorecard

Australia; 129/4 (20 overs)	v	New Zealand; 131/6 (20 overs)
Beth Mooney 61* (54); Frances Mackay 2/20 (4 overs)		Frances Mackay 46 (39); Megan Schutt 2/24 (4 overs)

New Zealand Women won by 4 wickets
McLean Park, Napier
Umpires: Kim Cotton (NZ) and John Dempsey (NZ)
Player of the match: Frances Mackay (NZ)

- New Zealand Women won the toss and elected to field.
- Darcie Brown (Aus) made her WT20I debut.

=== 3rd WT20I ===
1 April 2021
15:00
Scorecard

Australia; 14/1 (2.5 overs)	v	New Zealand
Alyssa Healy 8* (11); Rosemary Mair 1/5 (1 over)

No result
Eden Park, Auckland
Umpires: Kim Cotton (NZ) and John Dempsey (NZ)

- New Zealand Women won the toss and elected to field.
- Rain during Australia Women's innings prevented any further play.

== WODI series ==
=== 1st WODI ===
4 April 2021
11:00
Scorecard

New Zealand; 212 (48.5 overs)	v	Australia; 215/4 (38.3 overs)
Lauren Down 90 (134); Megan Schutt 4/32 (9 overs)		Alyssa Healy 65 (68); Amy Satterthwaite 1/10 (2 overs)

Australia Women won by 6 wickets
Bay Oval, Mount Maunganui
Umpires: Chris Brown (NZ) and Kim Cotton (NZ)
Player of the match: Megan Schutt (Aus)

- Australia Women won the toss and elected to field.

=== 2nd WODI ===
7 April 2021
14:00 (D/N)
Scorecard

Australia; 271/7 (50 overs)	v	New Zealand; 200 (45 overs)
Rachael Haynes 87 (105); Leigh Kasperek 6/46 (10 overs)		Amelia Kerr 47 (70); Jess Jonassen 3/29 (9 overs)

Australia Women won by 71 runs
Bay Oval, Mount Maunganui
Umpires: Kim Cotton (NZ) and Eugene Sanders (NZ)
Player of the match: Rachael Haynes (Aus)

- New Zealand Women won the toss and elected to field.
- Alyssa Healy (Aus) played in her 200th international match.

=== 3rd WODI ===
10 April 2021
14:00 (D/N)
Scorecard

Australia; 149/7 (25 overs)	v	New Zealand; 128/9 (25 overs)
Alyssa Healy 46 (39); Leigh Kasperek 3/24 (5 overs)		Lea Tahuhu 21* (13); Megan Schutt 2/22 (5 overs)

Australia Women won by 21 runs
Bay Oval, Mount Maunganui
Umpires: Chris Brown (NZ) and Eugene Sanders (NZ)
Player of the match: Alyssa Healy (Aus)

- New Zealand Women won the toss and elected to field.
- The match was reduced to 25 overs per side due to rain.
- Darcie Brown (Aus) made her WODI debut.
