= 2010–11 Action Cricket Twenty20 =

- Dates: 10 December 2010 – 5 February 2011
- Administrator(s): New Zealand Cricket
- Cricket format: Twenty20
- Tournament format(s): Round robin and final
- Champions: Canterbury Magicians (2nd title)
- Participants: 6
- Matches: 31
- Most runs: Suzie Bates (413)
- Most wickets: Natasha Miles (14); Lucy Doolan (14)

The 2010–11 Action Cricket Twenty20 was the fourth season of the women's Twenty20 cricket competition played in New Zealand. It ran from December 2010 to February 2011, with 6 provincial teams taking part. Canterbury Magicians beat Wellington Blaze in the final to win the tournament, their second Twenty20 title.

The tournament ran alongside the 2010–11 Action Cricket Cup.

== Competition format ==
Teams played in a double round-robin in a group of six, playing 10 matches overall. Matches were played using a Twenty20 format. The top two in the group advanced to the final.

The group worked on a points system with positions being based on the total points. Points were awarded as follows:

Win: 4 points
Tie: 2 points
Loss: 0 points.
Abandoned/No Result: 2 points.

== Points table ==
| Team | Pld | W | L | T | NR | Pts | NRR |
|---|---|---|---|---|---|---|---|
| Wellington Blaze | 10 | 8 | 1 | 0 | 1 | 34 | 0.807 |
| Canterbury Magicians | 10 | 7 | 3 | 0 | 0 | 28 | 0.626 |
| Central Hinds | 10 | 6 | 3 | 0 | 1 | 26 | 0.566 |
| Otago Sparks | 10 | 5 | 5 | 0 | 0 | 20 | 0.309 |
| Auckland Hearts | 10 | 2 | 7 | 0 | 1 | 10 | –0.791 |
| Northern Spirit | 10 | 0 | 9 | 0 | 1 | 2 | –1.568 |

Source: ESPN Cricinfo

Advanced to the Final

== Final ==
5 February 2011
Scorecard

| Wellington Blaze; 100/8 (20 overs) | v | Canterbury Magicians; 101/4 (18.2 overs) |
| Megan Wakefield 33 (37); Amy Satterthwaite 3/19 (4 overs) | | Maria Fahey 41 (46); Lucy Doolan 2/13 (4 overs) |

Canterbury Magicians won 6 wickets
Basin Reserve, Wellington
Umpires: Evan Gray and Phil Jones

- Wellington Blaze won the toss and elected to bat.

== Statistics ==
=== Most runs ===
| Player | Team | Matches | Innings | Runs | Average | HS | 100s | 50s |
|---|---|---|---|---|---|---|---|---|
| Suzie Bates | Otago Sparks | 10 | 10 | 413 | 51.62 | 78* | 0 | 3 |
| Amy Satterthwaite | Canterbury Magicians | 11 | 11 | 356 | 50.85 | 80* | 0 | 3 |
| Sophie Devine | Wellington Blaze | 10 | 10 | 348 | 69.60 | 99* | 0 | 1 |
| Lucy Doolan | Wellington Blaze | 10 | 10 | 296 | 32.88 | 50* | 0 | 1 |
| Aimee Watkins | Central Hinds | 9 | 9 | 293 | 32.55 | 61 | 0 | 3 |

Source: ESPN Cricinfo

=== Most wickets ===
| Player | Team | Overs | Wickets | Average | BBI | 5w |
|---|---|---|---|---|---|---|
| Natasha Miles | Otago Sparks | 29.0 | 14 | 14.64 | 3/17 | 0 |
| Lucy Doolan | Wellington Blaze | 37.0 | 14 | 16.00 | 4/10 | 0 |
| Frances Mackay | Canterbury Magicians | 38.0 | 13 | 12.53 | 3/13 | 0 |
| Kelly Anderson | Canterbury Magicians | 35.5 | 13 | 13.76 | 2/19 | 0 |
| Maneka Singh | Central Hinds | 35.2 | 13 | 16.07 | 3/15 | 0 |

Source: ESPN Cricinfo
