= Mark Coles =

New Zealand cricket coach

Personal information
- Full name: Mark Justin Coles
- Born: 1968 or 1969 (age 57–58)
- Relatives: Mike Coles (father)

Head coaching information
- Years: Team
- 2012–2014: Wellington Blaze
- 2017–2019: Pakistan women
- 2021–2022: Scotland women
- 2022: Papua New Guinea men (interim)
- 2023: Pakistan women
- Source: CricketArchive, 2 May 2023

Mark Justin Coles (born 1968/1969) is a New Zealand cricket coach and former player. He has served as head coach of the Pakistan women's national cricket team on two occasions. He has also coached the Scotland women's team and the Papua New Guinea men's team.

== Playing career ==
Coles played cricket for Wellington College First XI, and between 1992 and 1996, he was in the Wellington squad, making three appearances for the Second XI in the Provincial A tournament. He retired from cricket in 1996 due to a back injury.

== Coaching career ==
In 2000, Coles worked as a coach for the New Zealand women's "A" team. He then worked as a coach for Wellington College, and Sunshine Coast in Queensland, Australia. From 2010 until 2012, Coles was a coach for Vanuatu Cricket. He has also been a coach at Waikato Valley, Western Fury, and Wellington Blaze. Whilst head coach of Wellington Blaze, they won the 2012–13 New Zealand Women's Twenty20 Competition. He also worked as a coach for Northern Districts from 2014 to 2017.

In 2017, Coles was appointed head coach of the Pakistan women's national cricket team, initially on a trial basis. He was not initially paid for his work, and had to pay for his own flights to Lahore. Coles was the team's first non-Pakistani coach. After Pakistan won a match against New Zealand, he was given a two-year contract, on the proviso that he lived in Pakistan. He lived in Lahore in a compound with iron gates and snipers on the roof. Whilst he was head coach, Pakistan won nine of the 28 Women's One Day Internationals that they played, and 12 of their 30 Women's Twenty20 International matches, and also finished fifth in the 2017–20 ICC Women's Championship.

In 2019, Coles left his role with Pakistan women for family reasons; his grandmother and uncle had died earlier in the year. He had a contract until the end of the 2020 ICC Women's T20 World Cup. Coles was replaced as Pakistan women's head coach by Iqbal Imam, who served as an interim coach for the side. In 2020, Coles was a high performance manager for the Japan Cricket Association.

In 2021, Coles became head coach of the Scotland women's national cricket team. He was Scotland women's first full time coach. Under his leadership, Scotland won the 2021 ICC Women's T20 World Cup Europe Qualifier, which enabled them to qualify for the 2022 ICC Women's T20 World Cup Qualifier, and failed to qualify for the 2022 Commonwealth Games. In January 2022, Coles announced his resignation as Scotland head coach, effective from 26 February, as he wanted to move back to Australia as he had not seen his family due to COVID-19. He was appointed interim coach of Papua New Guinea in March 2022 following the resignation of Carl Sandri.

In January 2023, Coles was re-appointed as the head coach of Pakistan women team, on a two-year contract. He started the role in April 2023. However, on 10 August he resigned from his position for personal reasons.

== Personal life ==
Coles is from New Zealand, and attended Wellington College. His father Mike played for Wellington in the 1970s. He is married to Mel Coles and they have two children. During the mid-1990s he worked briefly in radio, primarily in sports reporting. In 2020, Coles spoke about how he had suffered from alcoholism and depression, and had previously contemplated suicide.
