= Polly Inglis =

New Zealand cricketer (born 1996)

Personal information
- Full name: Polly Margot Inglis
- Born: 31 May 1996 (age 30); Dunedin, Otago, New Zealand
- Batting: Right-handed
- Bowling: Right-arm medium
- Role: Wicket-keeper

International information
- National side: New Zealand
- ODI debut (cap 150): 4 March 2025 v Sri Lanka
- Last ODI: 9 March 2025 v Sri Lanka
- ODI shirt no.: 29
- T20I debut (cap 69): 14 March 2025 v Sri Lanka
- Last T20I: 18 March 2025 v Sri Lanka
- T20I shirt no.: 29

Domestic team information
- Years: Team
- 2012/13–present: Otago
- 2019: Nottinghamshire

Career statistics
Competition	ODI	T20I	WLA	WT20
Matches	3	6	113	95
Runs scored	43	7	1,880	1,109
Batting average	–	2.33	20.88	15.61
100s/50s	0/0	0/0	0/9	0/2
Top score	34*	4	83*	62
Catches/stumpings	5/0	2/1	64/17	30/15
- Source: ESPNcricinfo, 6 March 2023

Polly Margot Inglis (born 31 May 1996) is a New Zealand cricketer who currently plays for New Zealand women's cricket team and Otago in domestic cricket. She plays as a right-handed batter and wicket-keeper.

== Career ==
Inglis plays for Otago in Hallyburton Johnstone Shield and Super Smash. She made her List A debut against Auckland in the 2012–13 New Zealand Women's One-Day Competition on 24 November 2012. She made her Twenty20 debut against Auckland in the 2012–13 New Zealand Women's Twenty20 Competition on 23 November 2012. She was second highest run getter in the 2023–24 Hallyburton Johnstone Shield.

In June 2024, she was awarded her maiden central contract by New Zealand Cricket for 2024–25 season. On 30 November 2024 she played in her 100th List A match for Otago Sparks.

In October 2024, she earned maiden call-up for national team for the ODI series against India. She was named in T20I squad against Sri Lanka, in March 2025. She made her ODI debut against Sri Lanka on 4 March 2025. She made her T20I debut against Sri Lanka on 14 March 2025.

In June 2025, she was again named in New Zealand A squad against England A. In the same month she again awarded central contract by NZC for the 2025–26 season.
