= Kelly Anderson =

Kelly Anderson may refer to:

- Kelly Anderson (cricketer), (born 1983) New Zealand cricketer
- Kelly Anderson (tennis) (born 1985), South African former tennis player
- Kelly Anderson (curler) in 1989 Scott Tournament of Hearts
- Kelly Anderson (pageant contestant), Miss West Virginia
