= Rhys Morgan (cricketer) =

New Zealand cricketer (born 1978)

Personal information
- Full name: Harold Rhys Morgan
- Born: 3 November 1978 (age 48); Wellington, New Zealand
- Source: Cricinfo, 27 October 2020

Rhys Morgan (born 3 November 1978) is a New Zealand cricketer. He played in three first-class matches for Wellington in 2000/01.

He is currently the head coach of the Canterbury Magicians.

== See also ==
- List of Wellington representative cricketers
