= Margaret Marks =

New Zealand cricketer

Personal information
- Full name: Margaret Ellen Marks
- Born: 5 January 1918; Christchurch, New Zealand
- Died: 20 August 2014 (aged 96); Christchurch, New Zealand
- Batting: Right-handed
- Role: All-rounder

International information
- National side: New Zealand (1935–1948)
- Test debut (cap 7): 16 February 1935 v England
- Last Test: 20 March 1948 v Australia

Domestic team information
- Years: Team
- 1938/39–1947/48: Canterbury

Career statistics
Competition	WTest	WFC
Matches	2	11
Runs scored	30	304
Batting average	10.00	15.20
100s/50s	0/0	0/1
Top score	23	70*
Balls bowled	–	240
Wickets	–	6
Bowling average	–	24.33
5 wickets in innings	–	0
10 wickets in match	–	0
Best bowling	–	2/24
Catches/stumpings	0/–	9/–
- Source: CricketArchive, 29 November 2021

Margaret Ellen Marks (5 January 1918 – 20 August 2014) was a New Zealand cricketer who played as an all-rounder. She appeared in two Test matches for New Zealand between 1935 and 1948. She played domestic cricket for Canterbury.
