= Mike Coles =

New Zealand cricketer (born 1944)

Personal information
- Full name: Michael John Coles
- Born: 16 March 1944 (age 82); Wellington, New Zealand
- Relatives: Mark Coles (son)
- Source: Cricinfo, 24 October 2020

Michael Coles (born 16 March 1944) is a New Zealand cricketer. He played in 32 first-class and 7 List A matches for Wellington from 1965 to 1976.

== See also ==
- List of Wellington representative cricketers
