= Peg Taylor (cricketer) =

New Zealand cricketer

Personal information
- Full name: Margaret Jean Taylor
- Born: 19 February 1917; Christchurch, New Zealand
- Died: 22 July 2004 (aged 87); Christchurch, New Zealand
- Batting: Right-handed
- Bowling: Right-arm medium
- Role: Bowler

International information
- National side: New Zealand (1935)
- Only Test (cap 11): 16 February 1935 v England

Domestic team information
- Years: Team
- 1938/39–1952/53: Canterbury

Career statistics
Competition	WTest	WFC
Matches	1	25
Runs scored	3	727
Batting average	1.50	16.90
100s/50s	0/0	0/2
Top score	3	56
Balls bowled	96	2,248
Wickets	1	72
Bowling average	62.00	15.68
5 wickets in innings	0	2
10 wickets in match	0	0
Best bowling	1/62	6/49
Catches/stumpings	0/–	12/–
- Source: CricketArchive, 28 November 2021

Margaret Jean "Peg" Taylor (19 February 1917 – 22 July 2004) was a New Zealand cricketer who played primarily as a right-arm medium bowler. She appeared in one Test match for New Zealand, their first, in 1935. She played domestic cricket for Canterbury.
