= Annie Maloney =

Australian cricketer

Personal information
- Full name: Annie Rose Maloney
- Born: 4 March 1989 (age 37)
- Batting: Right-handed
- Bowling: Right-arm fast-medium

International information
- National side: Australia (2011)
- Only ODI (cap 121): 2 July 2011 v India

Domestic team information
- Years: Team
- 2007/08–2011/12: Victoria

Career statistics
Competition	WODI	LA	T20
Matches	1	16	19
Runs scored	–	8	0
Batting average	–	8.00	0.00
100s/50s	–	0/0	0/0
Top score	–	6*	0*
Balls bowled	36	634	332
Wickets	0	16	16
Bowling average	–	26.43	18.81
5 wickets in innings	–	0	0
10 wickets in match	–	0	0
Best bowling	–	4/26	3/11
Catches/stumpings	0/–	5/–	4/–
- Source: CricketArchive, 7 August 2025

Annie-Rose Maloney (born 4 March 1989) is an Australian cricketer and musician. A right-arm fast-medium bowler and occasional right-handed batter, she played a single One Day International (ODI) for the Australia women's national team against India in July 2011.

== Cricket career ==
Maloney played club cricket for Essendon-Maribyrnong, and in November 2007 she was selected to play for Victoria's state team for the first time in a Women's National Cricket League match. Representing Victoria between 2007/08 and 2011/12, Maloney played 15 List A matches in the Women's National Cricket League (WNCL) and 19 T20 matches in the Australian Women's Twenty20 Cup (WT20).

In February 2011, Maloney was included in Australia's squad for the final three matches of the 2010–11 Rose Bowl series. These matches were scheduled to be played that February, but due to the 2011 Christchurch Earthquake the matches were cancelled. The matches were rescheduled to June 2011, but the first match was abandoned without a ball bowled and Maloney did not play in either the second or third match. Maloney ultimately played her first and only One Day International for Australia against India on 2 July 2011. She bowled six overs without taking a wicket and did not bat.

== Music career ==
Maloney began releasing music in 2020 with Bonsai Records. Her first album Circle Walking was released 28 February 2025 and was inspired by her day job as a high school teacher.
