= Gabby Sullivan =

New Zealand cricketer (born 1998)

Personal information
- Full name: Gabrielle Eileen Suzanne Sullivan
- Born: 28 July 1998 (age 28); Christchurch, New Zealand
- Batting: Right-handed
- Bowling: Right-arm medium
- Role: Bowler

International information
- National side: Cook Islands (2025–present)
- T20I debut (cap 26): 9 April 2025 v Indonesia
- Last T20I: 9 September 2025 v Fiji

Domestic team information
- Years: Team
- 2015/16–present: Canterbury
- 2017: Dorset
- Source: Cricinfo, 24 February 2021

Gabrielle Eileen Suzanne Sullivan (born 28 July 1998) is a New Zealand–Cook Islander cricketer who currently plays for Canterbury. She is currently the captain of the Cook Islands in international cricket.

In February 2021, Sullivan earned her maiden call-up to the New Zealand women's cricket team, for their Women's One Day International (WODI) matches against England. She replaced Lea Tahuhu, who had been ruled out of the side due to a hamstring injury. In March 2021, Sullivan was added to New Zealand's Women's Twenty20 International (WT20I) squad for the matches against England, as injury cover for Hannah Rowe.
