= Rachel Candy =

New Zealand cricketer (born 1986)

Personal information
- Full name: Rachel Helen Candy
- Born: 23 July 1986 (age 40); Palmerston North, Manawatu, New Zealand
- Batting: Right-handed
- Bowling: Right-arm medium
- Role: Bowler

International information
- National side: New Zealand (2007–2013)
- ODI debut (cap 108): 26 August 2007 v England
- Last ODI: 10 October 2013 v West Indies
- T20I debut (cap 23): 12 August 2007 v England
- Last T20I: 22 October 2013 v England

Domestic team information
- Years: Team
- 2003/04–2009/10: Central Districts
- 2010/11–2016/17: Canterbury
- 2014–2015: Surrey

Career statistics
Competition	WODI	WT20I	WLA	WT20
Matches	18	10	151	74
Runs scored	27	14	834	333
Batting average	6.75	7.00	15.44	11.89
100s/50s	0/0	0/0	0/1	0/1
Top score	8	9*	81*	50
Balls bowled	720	198	5,695	1,297
Wickets	18	7	127	47
Bowling average	30.61	30.42	28.70	27.46
5 wickets in innings	1	0	2	0
10 wickets in match	0	0	0	0
Best bowling	5/19	2/24	5/19	3/21
Catches/stumpings	3/–	3/–	44/–	18/–
- Source: CricketArchive, 17 April 2021

Rachel Helen Candy (born 23 July 1986) is a New Zealand former cricketer who played as a right-arm medium bowler. She appeared in 18 One Day Internationals and 10 Twenty20 Internationals for New Zealand between 2007 and 2013. She played domestic cricket for Central Districts, Canterbury and Surrey.
