= Janet Brehaut =

New Zealand cricketer (born 1988)

Personal information
- Full name: Janet Catherine Brehaut
- Born: 24 July 1988 (age 38); Timaru, South Canterbury, New Zealand
- Batting: Right-handed
- Bowling: Right-arm medium
- Role: Batter

International information
- National side: New Zealand (2011)
- ODI debut (cap 123): 2 July 2011 v England
- Last ODI: 7 July 2011 v India

Domestic team information
- Years: Team
- 2007/08–2013/14: Canterbury

Career statistics
Competition	WODI	WLA	WT20
Matches	3	56	44
Runs scored	40	842	412
Batting average	20.00	20.04	15.84
100s/50s	0/0	1/3	0/1
Top score	23*	122	62*
Balls bowled	–	2	–
Wickets	–	0	–
Bowling average	–	–	–
5 wickets in innings	–	0	–
10 wickets in match	–	0	–
Best bowling	–	–	–
Catches/stumpings	3/–	12/–	8/–
- Source: CricketArchive, 14 April 2021

Janet Catherine Brehaut (born 24 July 1988) is a New Zealand former cricketer who played as a right-handed batter. She appeared in 3 One Day Internationals for New Zealand in 2011. She played domestic cricket for Canterbury. Brehaut completed a master's degree at the University of Canterbury in 2012.
