= Claudia Green =

New Zealand cricketer

Personal information
- Full name: Claudia Lauren Green
- Born: 6 December 1997 (age 28); Nelson, New Zealand
- Batting: Right-handed
- Bowling: Right-arm medium
- Role: Bowler

Domestic team information
- Years: Team
- 2018/19–present: Central Districts

Career statistics
Competition	WLA	WT20
Matches	41	62
Runs scored	122	118
Batting average	12.20	7.37
100s/50s	0/0	0/0
Top score	18	16
Balls bowled	1591	1091
Wickets	44	45
Bowling average	25.00	25.91
5 wickets in innings	1	0
10 wickets in match	0	0
Best bowling	5/30	4/24
Catches/stumpings	10/–	7/–
Medal record
Women's Cricket
Representing New Zealand
Commonwealth Games
Bronze medal – third place	2022 Birmingham	Team
- Source: Cricket New Zealand, 14 August 2024

Claudia Lauren Green (born 6 December 1997) is a New Zealand cricketer who plays for the Central Districts Hinds. On her debut in first-class cricket, Green took a wicket with her seventh delivery. Green is also studying physical education at the University of Otago, and was appointed as the Female Development Officer for Nelson Cricket.

In February 2021, during England's tour of New Zealand, Green took a five-wicket haul for the New Zealand XI Women side in a warm-up match. In August 2021, Green earned her maiden call-up to the New Zealand women's cricket team, for their tour of England. In July 2022, Green was added to New Zealand's team for the cricket tournament at the 2022 Commonwealth Games in Birmingham, England.
