= Emma Campbell =

New Zealand cricketer (born 1982)

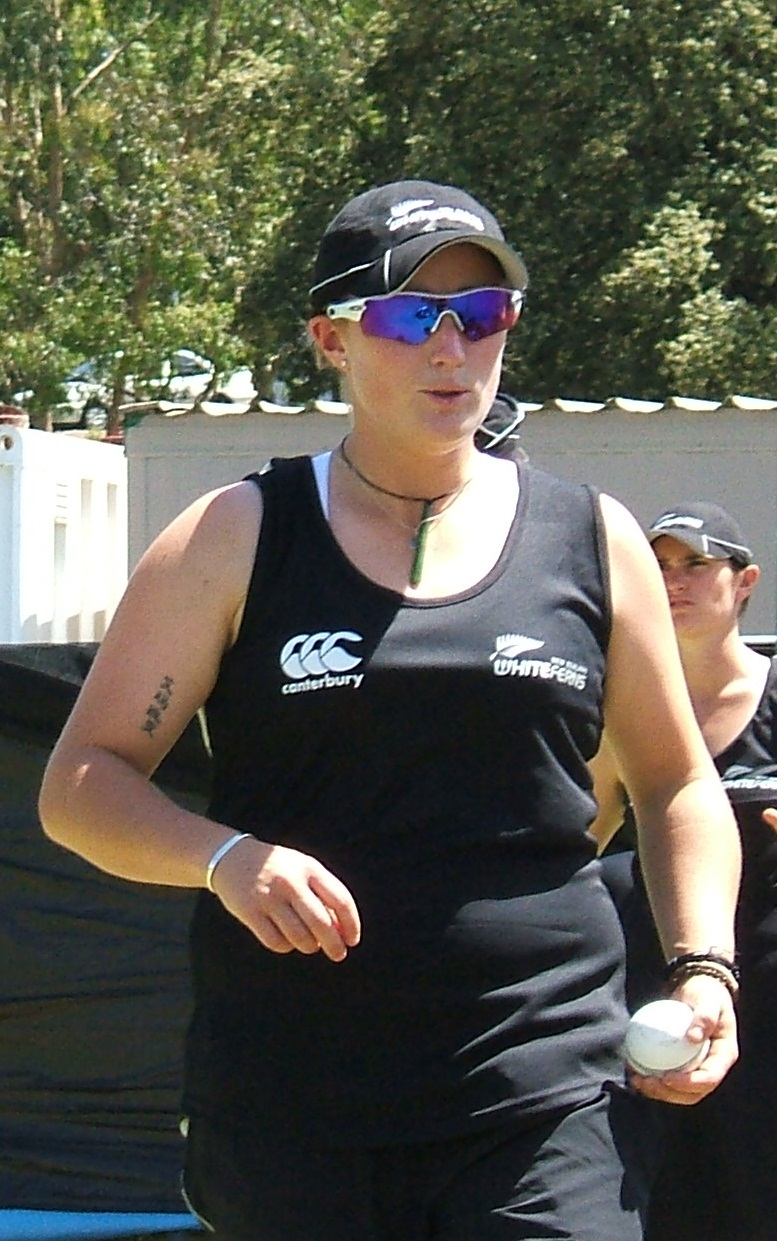

Personal information
- Full name: Emma Maree Campbell
- Born: 18 February 1982 (age 44); Timaru, South Canterbury, New Zealand
- Batting: Right-handed
- Bowling: Right-arm leg break
- Role: Bowler

International information
- National side: New Zealand (2010)
- ODI debut (cap 112): 10 February 2010 v Australia
- Last ODI: 6 March 2010 v Australia

Domestic team information
- Years: Team
- 2006/07: Canterbury
- 2007/08–2014/15: Otago
- 2008: Northamptonshire

Career statistics
Competition	WODI	WLA	WT20
Matches	2	80	32
Runs scored	14	336	134
Batting average	14.00	9.88	16.75
100s/50s	0/0	0/0	0/1
Top score	8*	43	52*
Balls bowled	84	3,594	630
Wickets	2	134	20
Bowling average	34.50	16.33	32.10
5 wickets in innings	0	2	0
10 wickets in match	0	0	0
Best bowling	1/19	5/3	3/18
Catches/stumpings	2/–	20/–	7/–
- Source: CricketArchive, 13 April 2021

Emma Maree Campbell (born 18 February 1982) is a New Zealand former cricketer who played as a right-arm leg break bowler. She appeared in 2 One Day Internationals for New Zealand in 2010. She played domestic cricket for Canterbury and Otago, as well as spending one season with Northamptonshire.
