= Village Green, Christchurch =

Former New Zealand cricket venue

Village Green
- QEII
- Interactive map of Village Green
- Location: Queen Elizabeth II Park, Christchurch, New Zealand
- Coordinates: 43°29′29″S 172°42′19″E
- Capacity: n/a

Construction
- Opened: n/a

Tenant
- Canterbury Wizards

Village Green was a cricket venue in Christchurch, part of the sporting complex at Queen Elizabeth II Park. Between 1999 and 2011 it staged 31 first-class and 20 List A matches, as well as 28 matches in the women's inter-provincial one-day competition. It was often used for Canterbury's matches when Lancaster Park was unavailable. The ground was so severely damaged in the 22 February 2011 Christchurch earthquake that it could no longer be used.

== History ==
Village Green was first utilised as a cricket venue for a significant match in October 1998 as the Canterbury Cricket Association (CCA) looked for alternatives to the frequently unavailable Lancaster Park and heavily used Hagley Oval. The following March it was called upon to host Canterbury’s Shell Trophy match against Otago, in doing so it became the 56th venue in New Zealand to host first-class cricket.

After several years of hosting matches with just 'tent village' surroundings, the lack of facilities caused it to overlooked by the CCA as a venue for two seasons. In 2002, work began to relocate the former New Brighton Trotting Club grandstand to adjacent the ground and repurposing the ground floor into a cricket pavilion.

In January 2005, during a match against Central Districts, Canterbury off spinner Paul Wiseman took bowling figures of 9/13, the second best recorded in the history of New Zealand domestic cricket. For the 2005–06 season, CCA chose the Village Green over Hagley Oval as the home venue for all of the team's first-class fixtures.

The ground staged five matches at the 2010 Under-19 Cricket World Cup.

Village Green was used to host the final of New Zealand's domestic one-day competitions in 2006 and 2011; the latter match between Canterbury and Auckland on 13 February 2011 was the last fixture played at the ground. It also hosted the final of the women's one-day competition in 2001, 2006 and 2011.

The ground was severely damaged beyond repair by the 22 February 2011 Christchurch earthquake with fissures across the pitch and outfield. The cricket pavilion also suffered significant damage, a review into the costs of repairing the building concluded in 2015 that it was unviable financially and it would be demolished. The rest of the wider Queen Elizabeth II complex had been demolished in 2012.
