= Canterbury Magicians =

Cricket team in New Zealand

Personnel
- Captain: Laura Hughes (one-day); Frances Mackay (T20)
- Coach: Rhys Morgan

Team information
- Colours: Red; Black
- Founded: First recorded match: 1932
- Home ground: Hagley Oval, Christchurch
- Secondary home ground(s): MainPower Oval, Rangiora

History
- First-class debut: Wellington in 1938 at Basin Reserve, Wellington
- HBJS wins: 39 (including 1 shared)
- SS wins: 6
- Official website: Canterbury Magicians

The Canterbury Magicians is the women's representative cricket team for the New Zealand region of Canterbury. They play their home games at Hagley Oval, Christchurch. They compete in the Hallyburton Johnstone Shield one-day competition and the Women's Super Smash Twenty20 competition. They are the most successful side in the history of the Hallyburton Johnstone Shield, with 39 title wins.

== History ==
Canterbury played their first recorded match in 1932, against Otago, which they won by five runs. They played in their first Hallyburton Johnstone Challenge Shield in 1938–39, losing to Wellington. After another failed attempt at winning the Challenge Shield a year later, they were victorious at their next attempt, in 1943–44, beating Auckland and Wellington. They defended their title in the next two tournaments.

Over the next twenty-five years, Canterbury added five Shield titles to their honours: in 1955–56, 1960–61, 1961–62, 1963–64 and 1966–67. Canterbury were victorious two more times in the early 1970s, before becoming the dominant force in the country from the 1978–79 season: they won 20 out of 21 titles between 1978–79 and 1998–99, only missing out in 1989–90, when they came second to Wellington. In 1962–63, Canterbury competed in the Australian Women's Cricket Championships.

Following their period of domination, they finished second to Auckland four times in a row before regaining the title in 2003–04, shared with Wellington as the final was rained-off. They won the title outright the following season, and three times in a row between 2006–07 and 2008–09. Wins came again in 2010–11, 2012–13, 2016–17 and most recently in 2020–21 with captain Frances Mackay hitting 94* to lead them to victory over Auckland. They are the most successful side in the history of the Hallyburton Johnstone Shield, with 39 title wins.

Canterbury have also played in the Super Smash Twenty20 competition since 2007–08. They won the inaugural competition, and five more times since, in 2010–11, 2011–12, 2015–16, 2020–21 and 2022–23. Their wins in 2007–08, 2010–11 and 2020–21 meant that they won the double of the Hallyburton Johnstone Shield and the Super Smash. Canterbury all-rounder Frances Mackay has been the leading run-scorer in the Super Smash three times, in 2015–16, 2016–17 and 2018–19, and was the leading wicket-taker in 2015–16 and 2020–21.

== Grounds ==
Canterbury have used various grounds throughout their history. Hagley Oval, Christchurch has remained their primary ground since their first home game against Otago in 1933. They also used Lancaster Park and St Andrew's College Ground in their early history.

In the 1970s, Canterbury began using Burnside Park, Christchurch and Porritt Park. From the 1998–99 season, they started using a larger number of grounds, such as Dudley Park, Rangiora, Village Green, Christchurch and Redwood Park, Christchurch. In 2017–18, Canterbury began playing in Lincoln, mainly at Lincoln Green. In the 2021–22 and 2022–23 seasons, their primary grounds were the Hagley Oval and the MainPower Oval, which they have used since 2006–07.

== Players ==
=== Current squad ===
Based on squad announced for the 2023–24 season. Players in bold have international caps.

No.	Name	Nationality	Birth date	Batting style	Bowling style	Notes
Batters
4	**Izzy Sharp**	New Zealand	1 December 2004 (age 20)	Right-handed	—	
18	Natalie Cox	New Zealand	21 August 1994 (age 31)	Right-handed	Right-arm medium	
39	Harriet Graham	New Zealand	18 March 2004 (age 21)	Left-handed	Right-arm leg break	
–	Emma Irwin	New Zealand	16 May 2004 (age 21)	Right-handed	Right-arm medium	
All-rounders
1	**Frances Mackay**	New Zealand	1 June 1990 (age 35)	Right-handed	Right-arm off break	T20 Captain
6	**Lea Tahuhu**	New Zealand	23 September 1990 (age 35)	Right-handed	Right-arm medium-fast	
15	Jacinta Savage	New Zealand	17 June 1995 (age 30)	Right-handed	Right-arm medium	
16	Jodie Dean	New Zealand	7 May 2002 (age 23)	Right-handed	Right-arm medium	
23	Melissa Banks	New Zealand	2 November 2001 (age 23)	Right-handed	Right-arm medium	
63	**Kate Anderson**	New Zealand	6 May 1996 (age 29)	Right-handed	Right-arm off break	
Wicket-keepers
8	Laura Hughes	New Zealand	16 October 1992 (age 33)	Right-handed	—	One-Day Captain
84	Abby Gerken	New Zealand	12 May 2002 (age 23)	Right-handed	Right-arm medium	
Bowlers
3	Sarah Asmussen	New Zealand	15 July 2000 (age 25)	Right-handed	Right-arm leg break	
19	Gabby Sullivan	New Zealand	28 July 1998 (age 27)	Right-handed	Right-arm medium	
24	Boadicea Lynch	New Zealand	24 May 2004 (age 21)	Right-handed	Right-arm medium	
30	Jessica Simmons	New Zealand	29 April 2000 (age 25)	Right-handed	Right-arm medium	
48	Abigail Hotton	New Zealand	19 December 2004 (age 20)	Right-handed	Right-arm off break	
56	Yssa Cullen	New Zealand	Unknown	Right-handed	Left-arm medium	
72	Nicola Clayton	New Zealand	16 April 2003 (age 22)	Right-handed	Right-arm medium	
–	**Erin Bermingham**	New Zealand	18 April 1988 (age 37)	Right-handed	Right-arm leg break	

=== Notable players ===
Players who have played for Canterbury and played internationally are listed below, in order of first international appearance (given in brackets):

- (New Zealand) Margaret Marks (1935)
- (New Zealand) Ruth Symons (1935)
- (New Zealand) Peg Taylor (1935)
- (New Zealand) Phyl Blackler (1948)
- (New Zealand) Esther Blackie (1949)
- (New Zealand) Verna Coutts (1954)
- (New Zealand) Mary Rouse (1954)
- (New Zealand) Joyce Currie (1954)
- (New Zealand) Evon Dickson (1957)
- (Australia) Joyce Dalton (1958)
- (New Zealand) Loretta Bayliss (1961)
- (New Zealand) Pat Moore (1961)
- (New Zealand) Jackie Lord (1966)
- (New Zealand) Janice Stead (1966)
- (New Zealand) Pat Carrick (1969)
- (New Zealand) Shirley Cowles (1969)
- (New Zealand) Jenny Olson (1969)
- (New Zealand) Ann McKenna (1969)
- (New Zealand) Ethna Rouse (1972)
- (New Zealand) Sue Rattray (1973)
- (New Zealand) Vicki Burtt (1977)
- (New Zealand) Sheree Harris (1978)
- (New Zealand) Karen Marsh (1978)
- (New Zealand) Sue Brown (1979)
- (New Zealand) Lesley Murdoch (1979)
- (New Zealand) Debbie Hockley (1979)
- (New Zealand) Nicki Turner (1982)
- (New Zealand) Ingrid Jagersma (1984)
- (New Zealand) Delwyn Costello (1985)
- (New Zealand) Karen Gunn (1985)
- (New Zealand) Nancy Williams (1985)
- (New Zealand) Brigit Legg (1987)
- (New Zealand) Kirsty Bond (1988)
- (Netherlands) (New Zealand) Nicola Payne (1988) (Note: Payne represented both the Netherlands and New Zealand in international cricket.)
- (New Zealand) Jennifer Turner (1988)
- (New Zealand) Debbie Ford (1988)
- (New Zealand) Catherine Campbell (1988)
- (Netherlands) Pauline te Beest (1990)
- (New Zealand) Maia Lewis (1992)
- (New Zealand) Sarah McLauchlan (1992)
- (New Zealand) Tania Woodbury (1992)
- (New Zealand) Trudy Anderson (1993)
- (New Zealand) Lisa Astle (1993)
- (New Zealand) Sarah Illingworth (1995)
- (New Zealand) Katrina Keenan (1995)
- (New Zealand) Justine Russell (1995)
- (New Zealand) Delwyn Brownlee (1995)
- (New Zealand) Karen Le Comber (1996)
- (New Zealand) Helen Daly (1996)
- (New Zealand) Kate Pulford (1999)
- (England) Claire Taylor (1998)
- (New Zealand) Haidee Tiffen (1999)
- (New Zealand) Helen Watson (1999)
- (Australia) Terry McGregor (1999)
- (New Zealand) Paula Flannery (2000)
- (New Zealand) Erin McDonald (2000)
- (New Zealand) Emily Travers (2000)
- (Netherlands) (New Zealand) Rowan Milburn (2000) (Note: Milburn represented both the Netherlands and New Zealand in international cricket.)
- (Australia) Lisa Sthalekar (2001)
- (England) Mandie Godliman (2002)
- (New Zealand) Fiona Fraser (2002)
- (New Zealand) Sara McGlashan (2002)
- (New Zealand) Rebecca Steele (2003)
- (New Zealand) Sarah Burke (2003)
- (New Zealand) Maria Fahey (2003)
- (New Zealand) Beth McNeill (2004)
- (New Zealand) Sarah Tsukigawa (2006)
- (New Zealand) Sophie Devine (2006)
- (New Zealand) Selena Charteris (2007)
- (New Zealand) Amy Satterthwaite (2007)
- (New Zealand) Rachel Candy (2007)
- (Cricket West Indies) Stacy-Ann King (2008)
- (New Zealand) Emma Campbell (2010)
- (New Zealand) Erin Bermingham (2010)
- (New Zealand) Kate Ebrahim (2010)
- (England) Fran Wilson (2010)
- (New Zealand) Kelly Anderson (2011)
- (New Zealand) Frances Mackay (2011)
- (New Zealand) Lea Tahuhu (2011)
- (New Zealand) Janet Brehaut (2011)
- (Cricket West Indies) Kyshona Knight (2013)
- (Cricket West Indies) Chinelle Henry (2013)
- (New Zealand) Hayley Jensen (2014)
- (Cricket West Indies) Vanessa Watts (2014)
- (New Zealand) Thamsyn Newton (2015)
- (Ireland) Meg Kendal (2016)
- (Australia) Sophie Molineux (2018)
- (Pakistan) Fatima Sana (2019)
- (Scotland) Samantha Haggo (2019)
- (New Zealand) Kate Anderson (2023)
- (New Zealand) Izzy Sharp (2025)
- (Cook Islands) Gabby Sullivan (2025)

== Coaching staff ==
- Head Coach: Rhys Morgan

== Honours ==
- Hallyburton Johnstone Shield:
  - Winners (38): 1943–44, 1944–45, 1945–46, 1955–56, 1960–61, 1961–62, 1963–64, 1966–67, 1972–73, 1975–76, 1978–79, 1979–80, 1980–81, 1981–82, 1982–83, 1983–84, 1984–85, 1985–86, 1986–87, 1987–88, 1988–89, 1990–91, 1991–92, 1992–93, 1993–94, 1994–95, 1995–96, 1996–97, 1997–98, 1998–99, 2004–05, 2006–07, 2007–08, 2008–09, 2010–11, 2012–13, 2016–17, 2020–21; shared (1): 2003–04
- Women's Super Smash:
  - Winners (6): 2007–08, 2010–11, 2011–12, 2015–16, 2020–21, 2022–23

== See also ==
- Canterbury cricket team
