= Samantha Curtis =

New Zealand cricketer (born 1985)

Personal information
- Full name: Samantha Rae Haereakau Curtis
- Born: 28 October 1985 (age 41); Auckland, New Zealand
- Batting: Right-handed
- Bowling: Right-arm leg break
- Role: Batter

International information
- National side: New Zealand (2014–2017)
- ODI debut (cap 126): 22 February 2014 v West Indies
- Last ODI: 5 November 2017 v Pakistan
- T20I debut (cap 40): 2 March 2014 v West Indies
- Last T20I: 9 November 2017 v Pakistan

Domestic team information
- Years: Team
- 2007/08–2015/16: Auckland
- 2016/17–2018/19: Northern Districts
- 2021/22–present: Northern Districts

Career statistics
Competition	ODI	T20I	LA	T20
Matches	20	8	125	81
Runs scored	346	13	2,651	954
Batting average	23.06	3.25	26.24	16.44
100s/50s	0/2	0/0	0/19	0/3
Top score	55*	8	95*	69
Balls bowled	60	–	1,290	355
Wickets	2	–	28	15
Bowling average	27.00	–	36.39	27.26
5 wickets in innings	0	–	0	0
10 wickets in match	0	–	0	0
Best bowling	1/15	–	3/19	3/17
Catches/stumpings	5/–	0/–	34/–	17/–
- Source: CricketArchive, 3 December 2021

Samantha Rae Haereakau Barriball (née Curtis; born 28 October 1985) is a New Zealand cricketer who currently plays for Northern Districts. She plays primarily as a right-handed batter. She appeared in 20 One Day Internationals and 8 Twenty20 Internationals for New Zealand between 2014 and 2017. She has previously played for Auckland.

In 2024, Curtis was named in the New Zealand Māori women's cricket team for the 2024 Women's T20I Pacific Cup.
