= Kelly Anderson (cricketer) =

New Zealand cricketer (born 1983)

Personal information
- Full name: Kelly Sarah Anderson
- Born: 4 February 1983 (age 43); Auckland, New Zealand
- Batting: Right-handed
- Bowling: Right-arm medium
- Role: Bowler

International information
- National side: New Zealand (2011)
- ODI debut (cap 120): 14 June 2011 v Australia
- Last ODI: 7 July 2011 v India
- T20I debut (cap 33): 23 June 2011 v England
- Last T20I: 27 June 2011 v India

Domestic team information
- Years: Team
- 2000/01: Northern Districts
- 2001/02–2003/04: Auckland
- 2009/10–2011/12: Canterbury

Career statistics
Competition	WODI	WT20I	WLA	WT20
Matches	6	2	52	26
Runs scored	22	1	116	40
Batting average	7.33	–	6.82	13.33
100s/50s	0/0	0/0	0/0	0/0
Top score	9*	1*	16	13*
Balls bowled	228	24	2,013	473
Wickets	5	3	53	26
Bowling average	37.40	5.66	25.33	15.76
5 wickets in innings	0	0	0	0
10 wickets in match	0	0	0	0
Best bowling	3/45	3/17	4/41	3/17
Catches/stumpings	0/–	0/–	11/–	3/–
- Source: CricketArchive, 21 April 2021

Kelly Sarah Anderson (née Hill; born 4 February 1983) is a New Zealand former cricketer who played as a right-arm medium bowler. She appeared in six One Day Internationals and two Twenty20 Internationals in 2011. She played domestic cricket for Northern Districts, Auckland and Canterbury.
