= Thamsyn Newton =

New Zealand cricketer (born 1995)

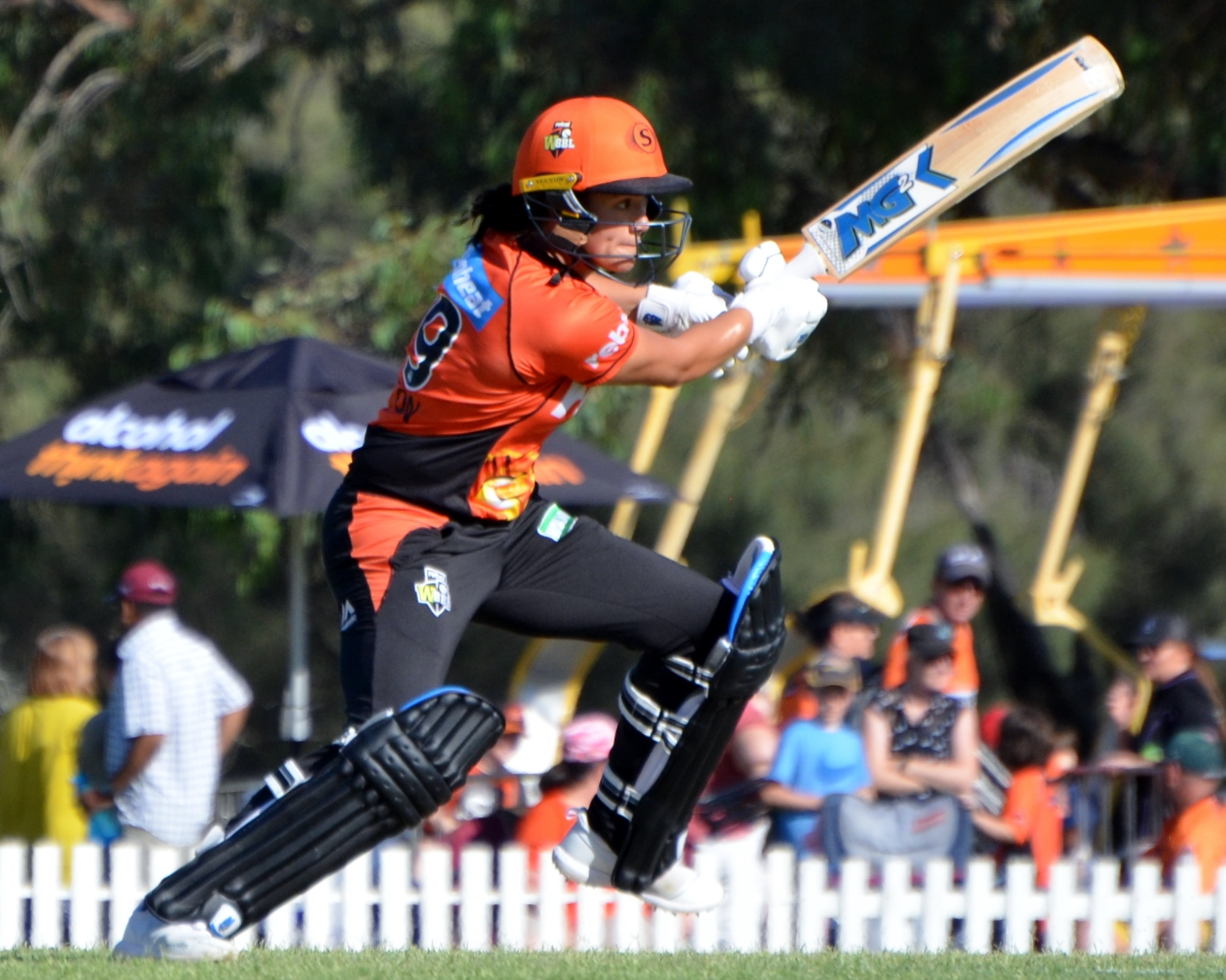
- Newton batting for Perth Scorchers during WBBL|03

Personal information
- Full name: Thamsyn Michelle Moupia Newton
- Born: 3 June 1995 (age 31); Paraparaumu, Wellington Region, New Zealand
- Nickname: Tim Tam
- Batting: Right-handed
- Bowling: Right-arm medium
- Role: All-rounder

International information
- National side: New Zealand (2015–2021)
- ODI debut (cap 134): 20 February 2016 v Australia
- Last ODI: 5 November 2017 v Pakistan
- ODI shirt no.: 99
- T20I debut (cap 48): 15 November 2015 v Sri Lanka
- Last T20I: 9 September 2021 v England
- T20I shirt no.: 99

Domestic team information
- Years: Team
- 2011/12–2013/14: Wellington
- 2014/15–2017/18: Canterbury
- 2017/18: Perth Scorchers
- 2018/19–2022/23: Wellington
- 2023/24–2024/25: Central Hinds

Career statistics
Competition	WODI	WT20I
Matches	10	15
Runs scored	57	22
Batting average	9.50	5.50
100s/50s	0/0	0/0
Top score	19*	14
Balls bowled	384	138
Wickets	11	9
Bowling average	25.00	14.00
5 wickets in innings	1	0
10 wickets in match	0	0
Best bowling	5/31	3/9
Catches/stumpings	5/–	8/–
- Source: Cricinfo, 7 November 2022

Thamsyn Michelle Moupia Newton (born 3 June 1995) is a New Zealand former cricketer and rugby union player. She plays cricket for Central Districts and New Zealand as a right-handed batter and right-arm medium pace bowler. In May 2021, Newton was awarded with her first central contract from New Zealand Cricket ahead of the 2021–22 season. She appeared in 10 One Day Internationals and 15 Twenty20 Internationals for New Zealand between 2015 and 2021.

She plays rugby for Wellington Pride.

In May 2025, she announced her retirement from all forms of cricket.
