= Kathy Cross =

New Zealand cricket umpire

Personal information
- Full name: Kathleen Cross
- Born: 28 July 1957 (age 69); Taumarunui, King Country, New Zealand
- Role: Umpire

Umpiring information
- WODIs umpired: 51 (2000–2017)
- WT20Is umpired: 19 (2013–2018)
- LA umpired: 5 (2004–2007)
- T20 umpired: 2 (2007–2015)
- Source: Cricinfo, 15 January 2022

Kathleen Cross (born 28 June 1957) is a New Zealand former cricket umpire who stood in sixty-nine international matches. In 2018, Cross retired from international umpiring at the end of the Women's Twenty20 International series between New Zealand and the West Indies.

== Early life ==
Kathleen Cross was born in Taumarunui in the Manawatū-Whanganui region, New Zealand. She is a member of the Ngāti Maniapoto iwi.

== Umpiring career ==
After giving up playing, Cross began umpiring cricket during the 1998/99 cricket season.

Cross was the New Zealand representative for the 2000 Women's Cricket World Cup.

In 2002, she became the first woman to be selected in a Test match umpiring team when she was named as fourth umpire for a match between New Zealand and England in Wellington.

Cross was now the first woman to be selected to the International Cricket Council (ICC) Associate and Affiliate panel of international umpires. She was one of the eight umpires to stand in matches in the 2016 ICC World Cricket League Division Four tournament. In January 2017, she was one of four female umpires named by the ICC to stand in matches in the 2017 Women's Cricket World Cup Qualifier. Cross has been an umpire in 22 Women's Cricket World Cup matches, the most by any umpire in the history of the Women's Cricket World Cup.

On 16 March 2018, in the Women's Twenty20 International fixture between New Zealand and the West Indies at the Bay Oval, in Mount Maunganui, she stood in her final match as an umpire before retiring.
