= Kate Ebrahim =

New Zealand cricketer (born 1991)

Personal information
- Full name: Kate Ellen Ebrahim
- Born: 11 November 1991 (age 35); New Plymouth, Taranaki, New Zealand
- Batting: Right-handed
- Bowling: Right-arm medium
- Role: All-rounder
- Relatives: Dion Ebrahim (husband)

International information
- National side: New Zealand
- ODI debut (cap 117): 7 March 2010 v Australia
- Last ODI: 10 July 2018 v England
- T20I debut (cap 31): 21 February 2010 v Australia
- Last T20I: 7 March 2021 v England

Domestic team information
- Years: Team
- 2006/07–2015/16: Central Districts
- 2014: Staffordshire
- 2016/17–2020/21: Canterbury
- 2021/22–2022/23: Otago
- 2024/25: Canterbury

Career statistics
Competition	WODI	WT20I
Matches	31	39
Runs scored	181	91
Batting average	10.64	8.27
100s/50s	0/0	0/0
Top score	24	27*
Balls bowled	1,099	580
Wickets	20	22
Bowling average	36.75	27.04
5 wickets in innings	0	0
10 wickets in match	0	n/a
Best bowling	3/33	3/9
Catches/stumpings	7/–	8/–
- Source: Cricinfo, 8 April 2021

Kate Ellen Ebrahim (née Broadmore; born 11 November 1991) is a New Zealand cricketer. In August 2018, she was awarded a central contract by New Zealand Cricket, following the tours of Ireland and England in the previous months. In October 2018, she was named in New Zealand's squad for the 2018 ICC Women's World Twenty20 tournament in the West Indies. In April 2022, Ebrahim was named the Hallyburton Johnstone Shield Player of the Year at the annual Otago Cricket Awards.

She is married to former Zimbabwean Test player Dion Ebrahim, who now coaches in New Zealand. She was appointed interim coach of the Zimbabwe women's cricket team for their tour of New Zealand in February and March 2026.
