= Erin Bermingham =

New Zealand cricketer (born 1988)

Personal information
- Full name: Erin Margaret Bermingham
- Born: 18 April 1988 (age 38); Greymouth, New Zealand
- Batting: Right-handed
- Bowling: Right-arm leg break
- Role: Bowler

International information
- National side: New Zealand (2010–2017)
- ODI debut (cap 119): 12 July 2010 v England
- Last ODI: 12 July 2017 v England
- ODI shirt no.: 19
- T20I debut (cap 30): 21 February 2010 v Australia
- Last T20I: 22 February 2017 v Australia

Domestic team information
- Years: Team
- 2006/07–2018/19: Canterbury
- 2014: Kent
- 2023/24–present: Canterbury

Career statistics
Competition	WODI	WT20I	WLA	WT20
Matches	34	31	146	118
Runs scored	187	74	1,733	1,078
Batting average	11.68	5.69	19.69	16.33
100s/50s	0/0	0/0	2/3	0/2
Top score	35	20	125*	65*
Balls bowled	1,565	630	6,289	2,491
Wickets	43	33	162	119
Bowling average	24.34	17.24	24.73	17.20
5 wickets in innings	0	0	0	0
10 wickets in match	0	0	0	0
Best bowling	4/16	2/12	4/16	4/7
Catches/stumpings	10/–	3/–	40/–	24/–
- Source: CricketArchive, 13 April 2021

Erin Margaret Bermingham (born 18 April 1988) is a New Zealand cricketer who plays as a right-arm leg break bowler. She appeared in 34 One Day Internationals and 31 Twenty20 Internationals for New Zealand between 2010 and 2017. She has played domestic cricket for Canterbury, as well as spending one season with Kent, in which she was the third-highest wicket-taker in the 2014 Women's County Championship, with her side also winning the competition. She has also worked as a police officer.

After retiring from all formats of cricket in 2019, she re-joined Canterbury during the 2023–24 season to cover for injuries.
