= Frances Mackay =

New Zealand cricketer (born 1990)

Personal information
- Full name: Frances Louise Mackay
- Born: 1 June 1990 (age 36); Christchurch, New Zealand
- Batting: Right-handed
- Bowling: Right-arm off break
- Role: All-rounder

International information
- National side: New Zealand (2011–present)
- ODI debut (cap 121): 14 June 2011 v Australia
- Last ODI: 26 March 2022 v Pakistan
- T20I debut (cap 35): 26 June 2011 v Australia
- Last T20I: 30 March 2021 v Australia

Domestic team information
- Years: Team
- 2007/08–present: Canterbury

Career statistics
Competition	WODI	WT20I
Matches	30	30
Runs scored	313	332
Batting average	16.47	19.52
100s/50s	0/0	0/1
Top score	39*	51
Balls bowled	994	526
Wickets	26	25
Bowling average	27.69	23.04
5 wickets in innings	0	0
10 wickets in match	0	0
Best bowling	4/34	3/18
Catches/stumpings	12/–	7/–
- Source: Cricinfo, 27 June 2022

Frances Louise "Frankie" Mackay (born 1 June 1990) is a New Zealand cricketer and commentator who currently plays for Canterbury and New Zealand.

In November 2024, Mackay became the leading run-scorer (male or female) in the history of domestic one-day cricket in New Zealand. She is also the leading women's wicket-taker at the same level.

== Early life ==
Mackay attended Burnside Primary School, where she played both cricket and rugby union. At Cobham Intermediate School she opened the batting with Corey Anderson. She joined the Lancaster Park Cricket Club in 2002 aged twelve, where she was coached by Selena Charteris.

== Playing career ==
Mackay debuted for Canterbury in their trophy-winning 2007–08 State League season. She was first selected for the national team in 2011 and played regularly at international level until 2014, when she was dropped after the 2014 Women's World Twenty20.

In January 2019, Mackay was recalled to New Zealand's squad to play in the Women's Twenty20 International (WT20I) series against India, after a gap of five years since she last played an international match.

In March 2019, she was named as the Burger King Super Smash Women's Player of the Year at the annual New Zealand Cricket awards. In May 2021, Mackay was awarded with her first central contract from New Zealand Cricket ahead of the 2021–22 season. In February 2022, she was named in New Zealand's team for the 2022 Women's Cricket World Cup in New Zealand.

Mackay is a proponent of the controversial mode of dismissal known as a Mankad, the act of running out a non-striker who has left their ground early. In the media, Mackay has defended other bowlers after high-profile Mankad incidents, and as a player she once obtained three dismissals via Mankads in a single domestic season. She was reputedly told to use this mode of dismissal less often.

== Commentary career ==
Mackay is a regular commentator of men's and women's domestic and international cricket in New Zealand. She began her media career on Lesley Murdoch's Saturday radio sports show in Christchurch. This led to a commentary role on Radio Sport for the West Indies tour of New Zealand in March 2018. She began calling men's and women's matches on television during the 2018–19 Super Smash for Sky Sport. During Bangladesh's tour of New Zealand in January 2022, Mackay and Katey Martin became New Zealand's first all-women cricket commentary team during a men's Test match. This was not scheduled deliberately; as members of a larger commentary squad, Mackay and Martin happened to be rostered together and they only realised the significance afterwards.

Mackay has also commentated the Everest Premier League in Nepal.

== Personal life ==
Mackay is a librarian at the Upper Riccarton branch of Christchurch City Libraries. She describes herself as a "bookworm" who aims to read 100 books per year.
