= Lea Tahuhu =

New Zealand cricketer

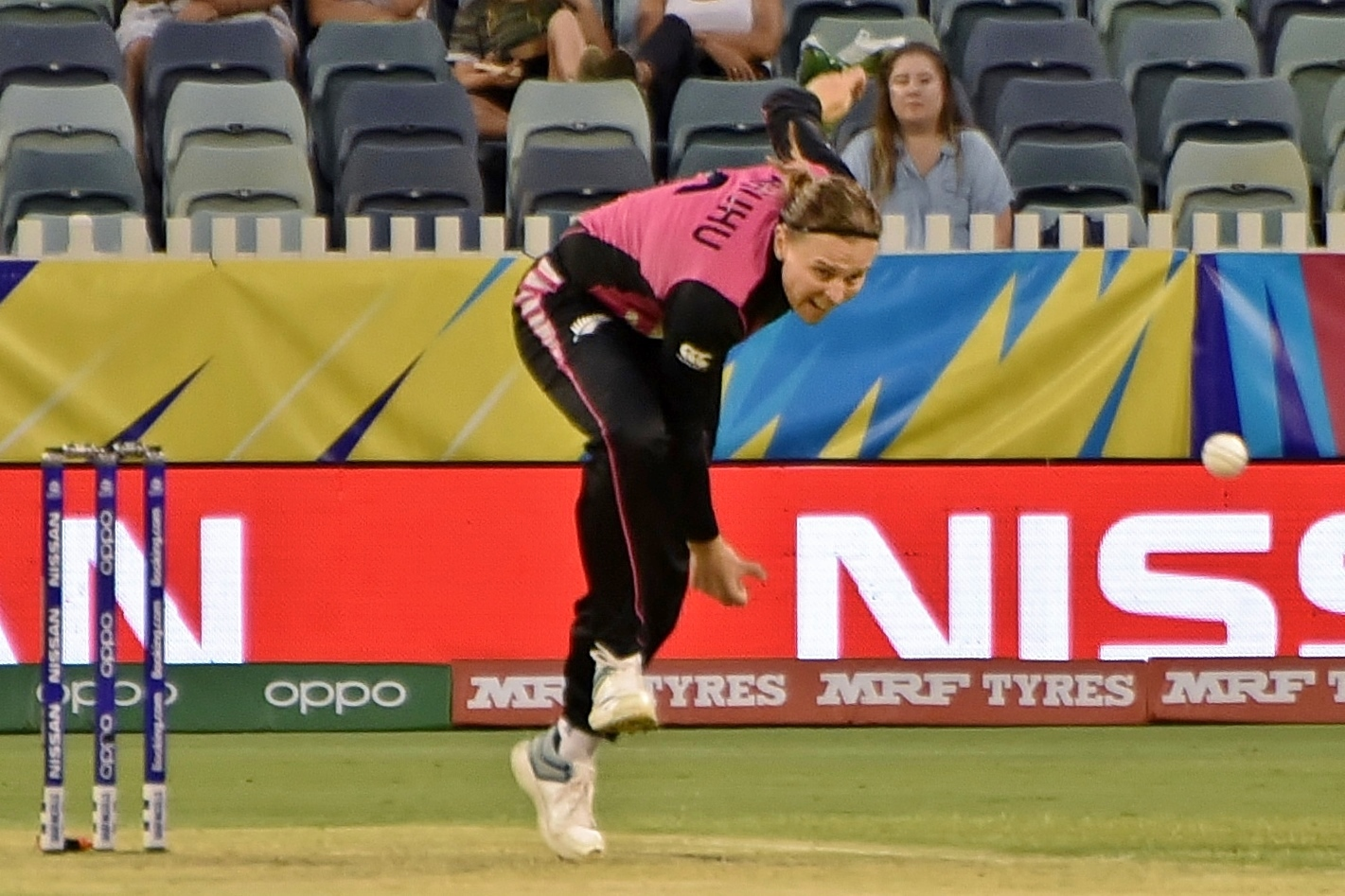
- Tahuhu at the 2020 T20 World Cup

Personal information
- Full name: Lea-Marie Maureen Tahuhu
- Born: 23 September 1990 (age 36); Christchurch, New Zealand
- Batting: Right-handed
- Bowling: Right-arm medium fast
- Role: Bowler
- Relatives: Amy Satterthwaite (wife)

International information
- National side: New Zealand (2011–present)
- ODI debut (cap 122): 14 June 2011 v Australia
- Last ODI: 29 October 2024 v India
- ODI shirt no.: 6
- T20I debut (cap 34): 25 June 2011 v India
- Last T20I: 20 October 2024 v South Africa
- T20I shirt no.: 6

Domestic team information
- Years: Team
- 2008/09–present: Canterbury
- 2015/16: Australian Capital Territory
- 2016: Surrey Stars
- 2016/17–2020/21: Melbourne Renegades
- 2017: Surrey
- 2017: Lancashire Thunder
- 2018: Trailblazers
- 2019: Supernovas
- 2022: Manchester Originals
- 2022/23: Sydney Thunder

Career statistics
| Competition | WODI | WT20I |
|---|---|---|
| Matches | 103 | 98 |
| Runs scored | 422 | 245 |
| Batting average | 9.81 | 11.13 |
| 100s/50s | 0/0 | 0/0 |
| Top score | 26 | 27 |
| Balls bowled | 4,628 | 1,773 |
| Wickets | 125 | 95 |
| Bowling average | 28.02 | 19.97 |
| 5 wickets in innings | 1 | 0 |
| 10 wickets in match | 0 | 0 |
| Best bowling | 5/37 | 4/6 |
| Catches/stumpings | 27/– | 19/– |
Medal record
Women's cricket
Representing New Zealand
ICC T20 World Cup
| Winner | 2024 UAE |
Commonwealth Games
| Bronze medal – third place | 2022 Birmingham |
- Source: ESPNcricinfo, 29 October 2024

Lea-Marie Maureen Tahuhu (born 23 September 1990) is a New Zealand cricketer who plays as a right-arm fast bowler. She made her international debut for the New Zealand women's cricket team in June 2011.

== Career ==
In December 2017, she was named as one of the players in the ICC Women's T20I Team of the Year.

In August 2018, she was awarded a central contract by New Zealand Cricket, following the tours of Ireland and England in the previous months. In October 2018, she was named in New Zealand's squad for the 2018 ICC Women's World Twenty20 tournament in the West Indies. Ahead of the tournament, she was named as one of the players to watch.

In November 2018, she was named in the Melbourne Renegades' squad for the 2018–19 Women's Big Bash League season. In January 2020, she was named in New Zealand's squad for the 2020 ICC Women's T20 World Cup in Australia. In August 2021, she was named in New Zealand's squad for the limited overs series against England which also marked her comeback return to the national side after 18 months since being diagnosed with a mole on her left foot. On 21 September 2021, in the third match against England, Tahuhu took her first five-wicket haul in WODI cricket.

In February 2022, she was named in New Zealand's team for the 2022 Women's Cricket World Cup in New Zealand. In July 2022, Tahuhu was added to New Zealand's team for the cricket tournament at the 2022 Commonwealth Games in Birmingham, England.

In September 2024 she was named in the New Zealand squad for the 2024 ICC Women's T20 World Cup. Her personal tournament highlight was taking 3/15 from four overs in the group stage win over India.

Tahuhu was named in the New Zealand squad for their ODI tour to India in October 2024.

In March 2026, she announced her retirement from ODI cricket.

== Personal life ==
Tahuhu is of Ngāi Tahu descent. She attended Aranui High School, and won the Peter Hooton Memorial Scholarship in 2008. She is married to fellow international cricketer Amy Satterthwaite. On 13 January 2020, Satterthwaite gave birth to a child and took an extended paid maternity leave.
