= 2013–14 West Indies Women T20 Tri-Series =

- Date: 14 – 26 October 2013
- Location: Barbados
- Result: West Indies won the tri-series
- Player of the series: Deandra Dottin (WI)
Teams
West Indies	England	New Zealand
Captains
Merissa Aguilleira	Charlotte Edwards	Suzie Bates
Most runs
Stafanie Taylor (160)	Charlotte Edwards (91)	Suzie Bates (112)
Most wickets
Shaquana Quintyne (8)	Jenny Gunn (11)	Erin Bermingham (7)

The West Indies Women T20 Tri-Series was a Women's Twenty20 International series which took place in Barbados in 2013. England, New Zealand and the West Indies competed in a double round-robin group stage, with England and the West Indies progressing to the final. The West Indies won the tournament, beating England in the final by 8 wickets. This was the first-ever win for the West Indies in a multi-nation home series in women's T20I cricket. The tournament followed New Zealand's tour of the West Indies and preceded England's tour of the West Indies.

== Squads ==
West Indies	England	New Zealand
Merissa Aguilleira (c) (wk); Shemaine Campbelle; Shanel Daley; Deandra Dottin; Chinelle Henry; Stacy-Ann King; Kyshona Knight; Anisa Mohammed; Juliana Nero; Shaquana Quintyne; Shakera Selman; Tremayne Smartt; Stafanie Taylor	Charlotte Edwards (c); Tammy Beaumont; Holly Colvin; Kate Cross; Tash Farrant; Lydia Greenway; Jenny Gunn; Danielle Hazell; Amy Jones; Beth Langston; Nat Sciver; Sarah Taylor (wk); Lauren Winfield; Danni Wyatt	Suzie Bates (c); Erin Bermingham; Nicola Browne; Rachel Candy; Sophie Devine; Natalie Dodd; Maddy Green; Frances Mackay; Morna Nielsen; Katie Perkins; Rachel Priest; Sian Ruck; Amy Satterthwaite; Lea Tahuhu

== Points table ==
Team	Pld	W	L	T	NR	Pts
West Indies (Q)	4	3	1	0	0	12
England (Q)	4	2	2	0	0	8
New Zealand	4	1	3	0	0	4
Source: ESPN Cricinfo

advanced to the Final

== Fixtures ==
=== 1st WT20I ===
14 October 2013
Scorecard

West Indies; 104/6 (20 overs)	v	New Zealand; 81 (19 overs)
Deandra Dottin 52 (50); Erin Bermingham 2/12 (4 overs)		Amy Satterthwaite 31 (43); Anisa Mohammed 5/12 (4 overs)

West Indies Women won by 23 runs
Kensington Oval, Bridgetown
Umpires: Gregory Brathwaite (WI) and Joel Wilson (WI)
Player of the match: Anisa Mohammed (WI)

- West Indies Women won the toss and elected to bat.
- Points: West Indies Women 4, New Zealand Women 0

=== 2nd WT20I ===
16 October 2013
Scorecard

New Zealand; 109/6 (20 overs)	v	England; 111/5 (19.1 overs)
Suzie Bates 48 (51); Nat Sciver 2/16 (3 overs)		Charlotte Edwards 42 (56); Nicola Browne 2/18 (4 overs)

England Women won by 5 wickets
Kensington Oval, Bridgetown
Umpires: Gregory Brathwaite (WI) and Peter Nero (WI)
Player of the match: Tammy Beaumont (Eng)

- New Zealand Women won the toss and elected to bat.
- Points: England Women 4, New Zealand Women 0

=== 3rd WT20I ===
18 October 2013
Scorecard

West Indies; 140/6 (20 overs)	v	England; 129/8 (20 overs)
Stafanie Taylor 40 (47); Danielle Hazell 3/19 (4 overs)		Charlotte Edwards 39 (40); Shaquana Quintyne 5/16 (4 overs)

West Indies Women won by 11 runs
Kensington Oval, Bridgetown
Umpires: Joel Wilson (WI) and Peter Nero (WI)
Player of the match: Shaquana Quintyne (WI)

- England Women won the toss and elected to field.
- Points: West Indies Women 4, England Women 0

=== 4th WT20I ===
20 October 2013
Scorecard

New Zealand; 101/7 (20 overs)	v	West Indies; 92/8 (20 overs)
Rachel Priest 26 (17); Stacy-Ann King 2/12 (2 overs)		Stafanie Taylor 24 (36); Erin Bermingham 2/14 (4 overs)

New Zealand Women won by 9 runs
Kensington Oval, Bridgetown
Umpires: Gregory Brathwaite (WI) and Peter Nero (WI)
Player of the match: Rachel Priest (NZ)

- New Zealand Women won the toss and elected to bat.
- Points: New Zealand Women 4, West Indies Women 0

=== 5th WT20I ===
22 October 2013
Scorecard

England; 125/8 (20 overs)	v	New Zealand; 106 (20 overs)
Danni Wyatt 37 (37); Morna Nielsen 2/24 (4 overs)		Suzie Bates 46 (51); Jenny Gunn 5/18 (4 overs)

England Women won by 19 runs
Kensington Oval, Bridgetown
Umpires: Joel Wilson (WI) and Peter Nero (WI)
Player of the match: Nat Sciver (Eng)

- England Women won the toss and elected to bat.
- Points: England Women 4, New Zealand Women 0

=== 6th WT20I ===
24 October 2013
Scorecard

West Indies; 118/7 (20 overs)	v	England; 118/7 (20 overs)
Stafanie Taylor 40 (43); Jenny Gunn 2/12 (2 overs)		Lydia Greenway 36 (27); Stafanie Taylor 3/15 (3 overs)

Match Tied
Kensington Oval, Bridgetown
Umpires: Gregory Brathwaite (WI) and Joel Wilson (WI)
Player of the match: Stafanie Taylor (WI)

- West Indies Women won the toss and elected to bat.
- Super Over: England Women 6/1, West Indies Women 9/0
- West Indies Women won the match on one-over eliminator
- Points: West Indies Women 4, England Women 0
- Kate Cross, Beth Langston (Eng) and Chinelle Henry (WI) all made their WT20I debuts.

== Final ==
26 October 2013
Scorecard

England; 115/5 (20 overs)	v	West Indies; 119/2 (16.5 overs)
Nat Sciver 36* (33); Stafanie Taylor 1/8 (4 overs)		Stafanie Taylor 51* (47); Jenny Gunn 1/16 (3 overs)

West Indies Women won by 8 wickets
Kensington Oval, Bridgetown
Umpires: Joel Wilson (WI) and Peter Nero (WI)
Player of the match: Stafanie Taylor (WI)

- England Women won the toss and elected to bat.
- West Indies Women won the 2013–14 West Indies Women T20 Tri-Series.

== See also ==
- New Zealand women's cricket team in the West Indies in 2013–14
- English women's cricket team in the West Indies in 2013–14
