= England women's cricket team in the West Indies in 2013–14 =

English women's cricket team in the West Indies in 2013/14
	West Indies	England
- Dates: 29 October – 3 November 2013
Captains	Merissa Aguilleira	Charlotte Edwards

One Day International series
- Results: England won the 3-match series 2–0
Most runs	Shaquana Quintyne (78)	Sarah Taylor (155)
Most wickets	Anisa Mohammed (4)	Holly Colvin (6)
- Player of the series: Sarah Taylor (Eng)

The England women's cricket team toured the West Indies in October and November 2013. They first played in the 2013–14 West Indies Women T20 Tri-Series, against the West Indies and New Zealand, which was won by the West Indies. They then played against the West Indies in three One Day Internationals (ODIs), winning the series 2–0. There was no result in the rain-affected first ODI, where only three overs could be bowled.

== Tri-Series ==
=== Squads ===
West Indies	England	New Zealand
Merissa Aguilleira (c) (wk); Shemaine Campbelle; Shanel Daley; Deandra Dottin; Chinelle Henry; Stacy-Ann King; Kyshona Knight; Anisa Mohammed; Juliana Nero; Shaquana Quintyne; Shakera Selman; Tremayne Smartt; Stafanie Taylor	Charlotte Edwards (c); Tammy Beaumont; Holly Colvin; Kate Cross; Tash Farrant; Lydia Greenway; Jenny Gunn; Danielle Hazell; Amy Jones; Beth Langston; Nat Sciver; Sarah Taylor (wk); Lauren Winfield; Danni Wyatt	Suzie Bates (c); Erin Bermingham; Nicola Browne; Rachel Candy; Sophie Devine; Natalie Dodd; Maddy Green; Frances Mackay; Morna Nielsen; Katie Perkins; Rachel Priest; Sian Ruck; Amy Satterthwaite; Lea Tahuhu

=== Group stage ===
16 October 2013
Scorecard

New Zealand; 109/6 (20 overs)	v	England; 111/5 (19.1 overs)
Suzie Bates 48 (51); Nat Sciver 2/16 (3 overs)		Charlotte Edwards 42 (56); Nicola Browne 2/18 (4 overs)

England Women won by 5 wickets
Kensington Oval, Bridgetown
Umpires: Gregory Brathwaite (WI) and Peter Nero (WI)
Player of the match: Tammy Beaumont (Eng)

- New Zealand Women won the toss and elected to bat.
- Points: England Women 4, New Zealand Women 0

18 October 2013
Scorecard

West Indies; 140/6 (20 overs)	v	England; 129/8 (20 overs)
Stafanie Taylor 40 (47); Danielle Hazell 3/19 (4 overs)		Charlotte Edwards 39 (40); Shaquana Quintyne 5/16 (4 overs)

West Indies Women won by 11 runs
Kensington Oval, Bridgetown
Umpires: Joel Wilson (WI) and Peter Nero (WI)
Player of the match: Shaquana Quintyne (WI)

- England Women won the toss and elected to field.
- Points: West Indies Women 4, England Women 0

22 October 2013
Scorecard

England; 125/8 (20 overs)	v	New Zealand; 106 (20 overs)
Danni Wyatt 37 (37); Morna Nielsen 2/24 (4 overs)		Suzie Bates 46 (51); Jenny Gunn 5/18 (4 overs)

England Women won by 19 runs
Kensington Oval, Bridgetown
Umpires: Joel Wilson (WI) and Peter Nero (WI)
Player of the match: Nat Sciver (Eng)

- England Women won the toss and elected to bat.
- Points: England Women 4, New Zealand Women 0

24 October 2013
Scorecard

West Indies; 118/7 (20 overs)	v	England; 118/7 (20 overs)
Stafanie Taylor 40 (43); Jenny Gunn 2/12 (2 overs)		Lydia Greenway 36 (27); Stafanie Taylor 3/15 (3 overs)

Match Tied
Kensington Oval, Bridgetown
Umpires: Gregory Brathwaite (WI) and Joel Wilson (WI)
Player of the match: Stafanie Taylor (WI)

- West Indies Women won the toss and elected to bat.
- Super Over: England Women 6/1, West Indies Women 9/0
- West Indies Women won the match on one-over eliminator
- Points: West Indies Women 4, England Women 0
- Kate Cross, Beth Langston (Eng) and Chinelle Henry (WI) all made their WT20I debuts.

=== Final ===
26 October 2013
Scorecard

England; 115/5 (20 overs)	v	West Indies; 119/2 (16.5 overs)
Nat Sciver 36* (33); Stafanie Taylor 1/8 (4 overs)		Stafanie Taylor 51* (47); Jenny Gunn 1/16 (3 overs)

West Indies Women won by 8 wickets
Kensington Oval, Bridgetown
Umpires: Joel Wilson (WI) and Peter Nero (WI)
Player of the match: Stafanie Taylor (WI)

- England Women won the toss and elected to bat.
- West Indies Women won the 2013–14 West Indies Women T20 Tri-Series.

== WODI Series ==
=== Squads ===
West Indies	England
Merissa Aguilleira (c) (wk); Shemaine Campbelle; Shanel Daley; Deandra Dottin; Kycia Knight; Kyshona Knight; Natasha McLean; Anisa Mohammed; Subrina Munroe; June Ogle; Shaquana Quintyne; Tremayne Smartt; Stafanie Taylor	Charlotte Edwards (c); Tammy Beaumont; Holly Colvin; Kate Cross; Tash Farrant; Lydia Greenway; Jenny Gunn; Danielle Hazell; Amy Jones; Beth Langston; Nat Sciver; Sarah Taylor (wk); Lauren Winfield; Danni Wyatt

=== 1st ODI ===
29 October 2013
Scorecard

England; 5/0 (3 overs)	v	West Indies
Charlotte Edwards 3* (14)

No result
Queen's Park Oval, Port of Spain
Umpires: Nigel Duguid (WI) and Zahid Bassarath (WI)

- West Indies Women won the toss and elected to field.
- No further play possible due to rain.
- Kate Cross (Eng) made her WODI debut.

=== 2nd ODI ===
1 November 2013
Scorecard

West Indies; 126 (38.1 overs)	v	England; 127/3 (33.3 overs)
Shaquana Quintyne 42 (50); Kate Cross 4/51 (10 overs)		Sarah Taylor 55* (74); Tremayne Smartt 1/17 (8 overs)

England Women won by 7 wickets
Queen's Park Oval, Port of Spain
Umpires: Danesh Ramdhanie (WI) and Nigel Duguid (WI)
Player of the match: Kate Cross (Eng)

- West Indies Women won the toss and elected to bat.

=== 3rd ODI ===
3 November 2013
Scorecard

England; 185 (50 overs)	v	West Indies; 96 (36.4 overs)
Sarah Taylor 100 (108); Anisa Mohammed 4/26 (10 overs)		Shaquana Quintyne 36* (64); Holly Colvin 4/17 (8.4 overs)

England Women won by 89 runs
Queen's Park Oval, Port of Spain
Umpires: Danesh Ramdhanie (WI) and Nigel Duguid (WI)
Player of the match: Sarah Taylor (Eng)

- West Indies Women won the toss and elected to field.
- Tash Farrant (Eng) made her WODI debut.

== See also ==
- 2013–14 West Indies Women T20 Tri-Series
