= New Zealand women's cricket team in the West Indies in 2013–14 =

	West Indies	New Zealand
- Dates: 6 – 10 October 2013
Captains	Merissa Aguilleira	Suzie Bates

One Day International series
- Results: West Indies won the 3-match series 2–1
Most runs	Stafanie Taylor (182)	Suzie Bates (114)
Most wickets	Stafanie Taylor (11)	Morna Nielsen (6)
- Player of the series: Stafanie Taylor (WI)

The New Zealand women's national cricket team toured the West Indies in October 2013. They played the West Indies in three One Day Internationals, losing the series 2–1. They then played in the 2013–14 West Indies Women T20 Tri-Series, against England and the West Indies. The West Indies won the tournament, beating England in the final by 8 wickets.

== WODI Series ==
=== Squads ===
West Indies	New Zealand
Merissa Aguilleira (c) (wk); Shemaine Campbelle; Shanel Daley; Deandra Dottin; Kycia Knight; Kyshona Knight; Natasha McLean; Anisa Mohammed; Subrina Munroe; Shaquana Quintyne; Shakera Selman; Tremayne Smartt; Stafanie Taylor	Suzie Bates (c); Erin Bermingham; Nicola Browne; Rachel Candy; Sophie Devine; Natalie Dodd; Maddy Green; Frances Mackay; Morna Nielsen; Katie Perkins; Rachel Priest; Sian Ruck; Amy Satterthwaite; Lea Tahuhu

=== 1st ODI ===
6 October 2013
Scorecard

New Zealand; 225/8 (50 overs)	v	West Indies; 224 (49.3 overs)
Suzie Bates 110 (133); Stafanie Taylor 4/19 (7 overs)		Deandra Dottin 65 (66); Nicola Browne 3/28 (6.3 overs)

New Zealand Women won by 1 run
Sabina Park, Kingston
Umpires: Norman Malcolm (WI) and Verdayne Smith (WI)
Player of the match: Suzie Bates (NZ)

- New Zealand Women won the toss and elected to bat.

=== 2nd ODI ===
8 October 2013
Scorecard

West Indies; 148 (50 overs)	v	New Zealand; 59 (28.5 overs)
Shaquana Quintyne 29 (58); Morna Nielsen 3/12 (10 overs)		Katie Perkins 18* (58); Stafanie Taylor 3/10 (8 overs)

West Indies Women by 89 runs
Sabina Park, Kingston
Umpires: Patrick Gustard (WI) and Verdayne Smith (WI)
Player of the match: Shaquana Quintyne (WI)

- West Indies Women won the toss and elected to bat.

=== 3rd ODI ===
10 October 2013
Scorecard

West Indies; 238/6 (50 overs)	v	New Zealand; 143 (43 overs)
Stafanie Taylor 135* (148); Erin Bermingham 2/30 (6 overs)		Katie Perkins 34 (72); Stafanie Taylor 4/35 (8 overs)

West Indies Women by 95 runs
Sabina Park, Kingston
Umpires: Norman Malcolm (WI) and Patrick Gustard (WI)
Player of the match: Stafanie Taylor (WI)

- West Indies Women won the toss and elected to bat.

== See also ==
- 2013–14 West Indies Women T20 Tri-Series
