= 2018 Women's World Twenty20 final =

International cricket match

2018 ICC Women's World Twenty20 Final
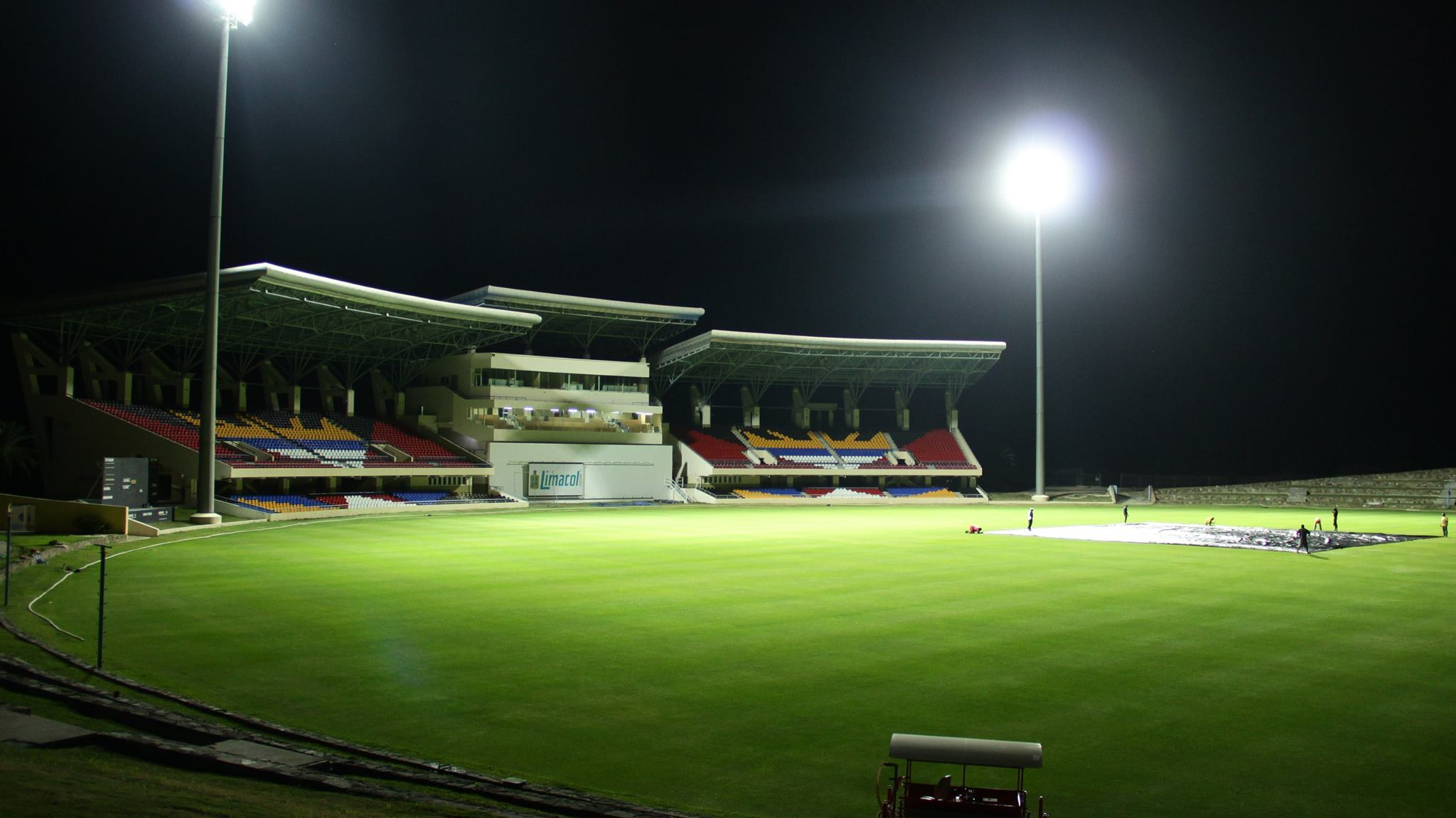
- The Sir Vivian Richards Stadium in 2015
- Event: 2018 Women's World Twenty20
England	Australia
(England)	(Australia)
105	106/2
19.4 overs	15.1 overs
- Australia won by 8 wickets
- Date: 24 November 2018
- Venue: Sir Vivian Richards Stadium, Antigua and Barbuda
- Player of the match: Ashleigh Gardner (Aus)
- Umpires: Shaun George (SA) and Langton Rusere (Zim)

The 2018 ICC Women's World Twenty20 Final was a Women's Twenty20 International cricket match played between Australia and England on 24 November 2018 at the Sir Vivian Richards Stadium in Antigua and Barbuda. It was the culmination of the 2018 ICC Women's World Twenty20, the sixth ICC Women's World Twenty20. Australia won the match by eight wickets, securing their fourth World Twenty20 title. It was the third time that the two teams had met at this stage of a World Twenty20 – Australia have won on both occasions, in 2012 and 2014.

After winning the toss, England captain Heather Knight opted to bat first. Her side were bowled out for 105 runs from 19.4 overs. Opening batter Danielle Wyatt was the highest scorer for England with 43 runs, and alongside her, only Knight reached double figures, scoring 25. Ashleigh Gardner took three wickets for Australia, while Georgia Wareham and Megan Schutt took two apiece. Alyssa Healy scored quickly for Australia to start their chase, but they lost early wickets to fall to 44 for two. Meg Lanning and Gardner then took over and propelled Australia to victory by eight wickets. For her all-round performance, Gardner was awarded the player of the match award.

== Route to the final ==
=== Group stage ===
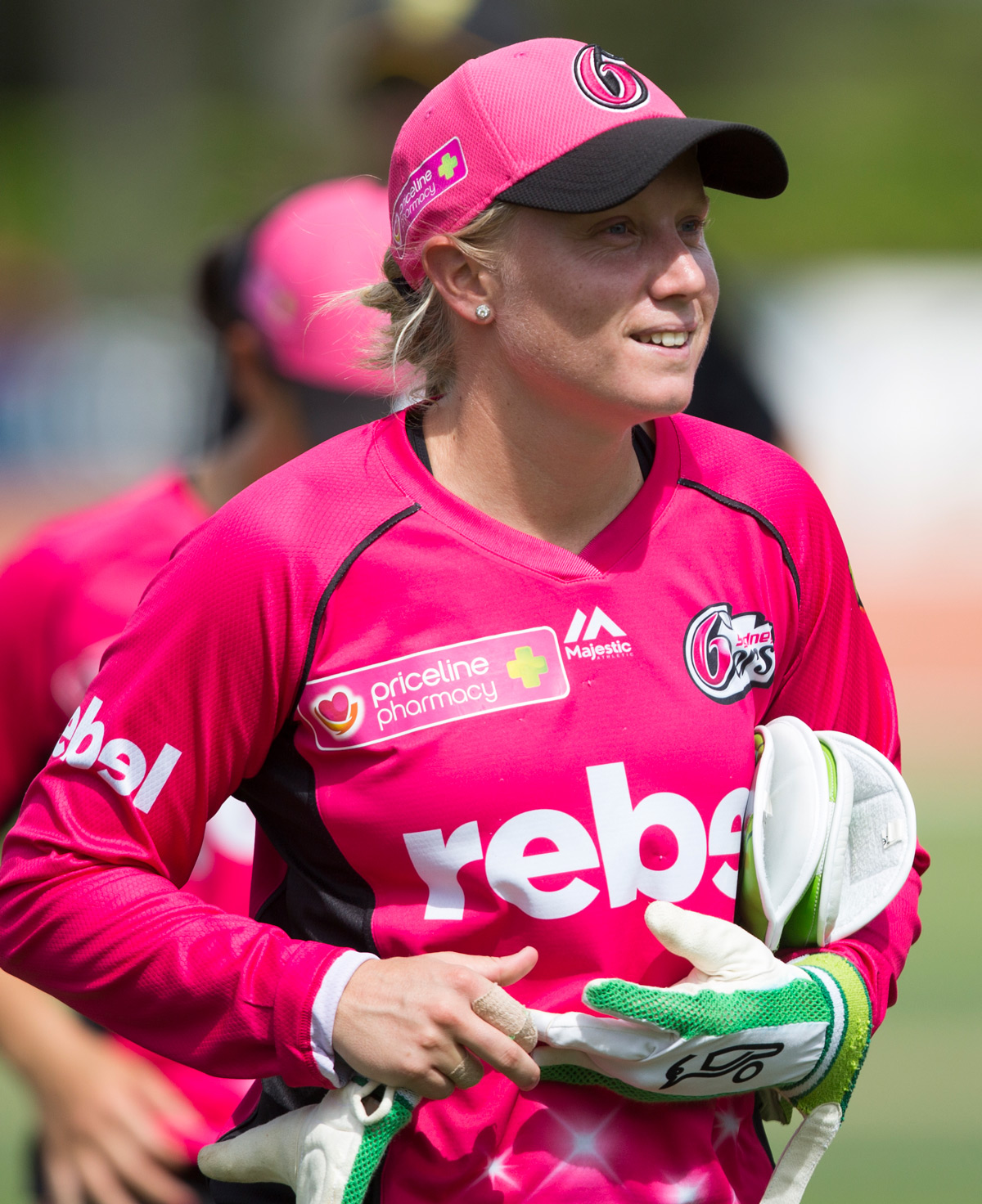
Alyssa Healy was player of the match in each of her team's three group stage victories.

Australia were drawn in Group B, along with India, Ireland, New Zealand and Pakistan. They started their campaign against Pakistan; Alyssa Healy and Beth Mooney shared a 72-run partnership for the first wicket, and each were eventually dismissed for 48 runs to help Australia to a score of 165 for five. Australia utilised their bowlers, described by ESPNcricinfo's Karthik Krishnaswamy as "a varied and accurate attack with three seam options and three different spin options," to restrict Pakistan to 113 runs, granting Australia a 52-run victory. In their second match, against Ireland, Australia took five wickets for sixteen runs after the completion of the powerplay to help limit their opponents to a score of 93 for six. In reply, Healy scored the fastest half-century in Women's World Twenty20 history, and the second-fastest in all women's Twenty20 Internationals, taking 21 balls to reach her fifty. Australia chased down their target with more than half of their overs remaining, to win by nine wickets.

After an opening partnership of 71 in the third match of the group against New Zealand, Australia then struggled a little; Alex Malcolm of ESPNcricinfo described that New Zealand had managed to "expose some vulnerabilities in the powerful Australian line-up". Healy scored 53 runs from 38 balls, but Australia lost seven wickets, and needed a late innings score of 29 runs from Rachael Haynes to help them reach 153. In response, New Zealand lost their first three wickets cheaply, falling to 13 for three. Suzie Bates scored 48 runs, but ultimately three wickets for Megan Schutt meant that New Zealand were bowled out for 120 runs, meaning Australia won by 33 runs. In their final group game, Australia faced India. Scores of 83 from Smriti Mandhana and 43 from Harmanpreet Kaur propelled India to a score of 167 for eight. Late in the India innings, Healy and Schutt collided, resulting in a mild concussion for Healy which meant that she was not able to bat during Australia's innings. Elyse Villani opened the innings with Mooney, but against a spin dominated bowling attack, Australia struggled to score runs. Ellyse Perry top-scored with 39 runs, but economical bowling from Anuja Patil and Radha Yadav saw Australia bowled out for 119, their first loss of the competition. As a result, Australia finished second in the group, behind India, and faced the winner of Group A in the semi-finals.

England were placed in Group A, alongside Bangladesh, South Africa, Sri Lanka and West Indies. They were due to open their campaign against Sri Lanka, but the match was abandoned without any play being possible due to heavy rain, so each team was awarded one point (compared to two points for a win). In their second match, against Bangladesh, England limited their opponents to 76 for nine, helped by Kirstie Gordon who took three wickets. In their reply, England lost both openers early, but runs from Amy Jones helped them reach 55 for three before the rain arrived. A lengthy delay ensued, but on the resumption of play England were set a revised target of 64. They scored the additional nine runs they needed from three balls to win by seven wickets.

Against South Africa, England's bowlers provided the platform for victory. Natalie Sciver bowled twenty dot balls on the way to taking three wickets and only conceding four runs, while Anya Shrubsole took a hat-trick, while conceding 11 runs. South Africa were bowled out for 85 runs, which England chased in under fifteen overs, with runs from both openers, Danielle Wyatt (27) and Tammy Beaumont (24). The final match of the group stage, against the West Indies, determined which team would finish top of the group, and face Australia. England batted first but lost regular wickets as they tried to set a total. They were 50 for six when Sophia Dunkley was joined at the crease by Anya Shrubsole. The pair scored 58 runs together before Dunkley was dismissed for 35; Shrubsole finished with 29, to help England score 115 runs, described as "a meagre total" by ESPNcricinfo's Alan Gardner. In the West Indies reply, Deandra Dottin made 46, and Shemaine Campbelle 45 as the match went all the way to the last over; Shrubsole recorded bowling figures for three for ten for England, but she could not prevent the West Indies winning by four wickets with three balls remaining.

=== Semifinals ===
Australia faced the West Indies in the first of the semi-finals, which were played as a double-header. The West Indies won the toss and asked the Australians to bat first. They lost Mooney early on, but Healy scored 46 runs at more than a-run-a-ball and shared a fifty run partnership with Meg Lanning. Lanning batted patiently to score 31 runs, while a late flurry from Haynes pushed Australia to their total of 142 for five. In response, the West Indies "[crumbled] in the face of sustained pressure" and could only score 71 runs; Stafanie Taylor was the top-scorer with 16 runs, while Perry, Ashleigh Gardner and Delissa Kimmince each took two wickets for Australia. In the second semi-final, India batted first against England. Quick scoring from Mandhana and Jemimah Rodrigues helped India reach 89 for two, but they subsequently lost their remaining eight wickets for 23 runs. England's spin bowlers, Sophie Ecclestone, Heather Knight and Gordon did the damage, taking seven wickets between them, along with three run outs. In their chase, neither of England's openers made significant contributions, but a third-wicket partnership of 92 runs between Jones and Sciver propelled England to victory with 17 balls left.

== Build up ==
Australia were widely considered the favourites coming into the tournament. Lisa Sthalekar, a former Australian captain, was more cautious, claiming that "you can’t say one country is the favourite", as there "are probably two or three teams that could potentially win the trophy." After similar routes to the final, Australia were still rated as favourites in the buildup to the match. Annesha Ghosh of ESPNcricinfo suggested that England suffered from "unpredictability as a fielding unit" and had suffered from "an overall lacklustre performance with the bat from the line-up through the tournament."

At least one of Australia and England had been in each of the five previous Women's World Twenty 20 Finals; in the inaugural 2009 tournament, England were champions, but Australia won each of the next three competitions. In Australia's 2012 and 2014 victories, they beat England in the final. England were the reigning Women's Cricket World Cup champions, having won the 50-over tournament the previous year. Both teams chose unchanged teams from their semi-finals.

== Match ==
=== Summary ===
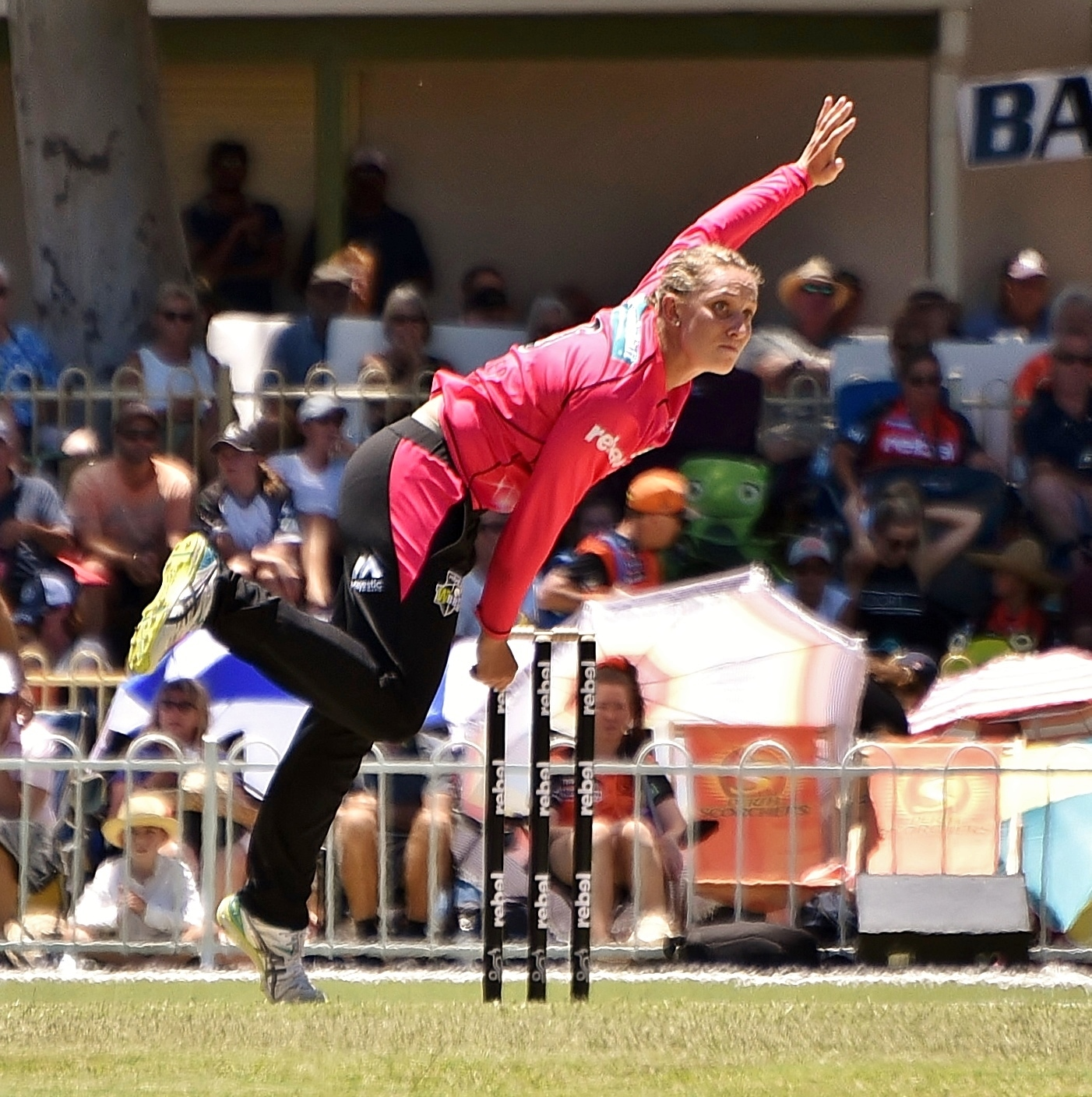
Australia's Ashleigh Gardner was player of the match for her 33* and three wickets.

The final was played under floodlights at the Sir Vivian Richards Stadium, in North Sound, Antigua, roughly a 15-minute drive north of the country's capital city, St. John's. The stadium had not been used during the group stage of the tournament, but hosted both semi-finals prior to the final. A crowd of over 9,000 attended the match, which began at 20:00 AST (UTC–4) with a scheduled break between the two innings from 21:30 to 21:50; play was due to finish by 23:20. Langton Rusere of Zimbabwe and the South African Shaun George were appointed at on-field umpires for the match, with Gregory Brathwaite as the TV umpire. Nitin Menon served as reserve umpire, while Sir Richie Richardson was the match referee. Rusere's appointment marked the first time that a Zimbabwean had stood in the final of a major international cricket tournament. George had previously umpired in three Women's Cricket World Cup finals, in each of 2005, 2013 and 2017.

England's captain, Knight, won the toss and chose to bat first, suggesting that it looked a "better wicket than the semi-final. Not as slow as the last game." Former Australian cricketer Lisa Sthalekar suggested that England should be targeting 140 runs on a pitch that the ground-staff had "scraped all the dead grass off," leaving a "nice sheen to the surface." Australia opened their bowling attack with the left-arm spin bowler, Sophie Molineux, but she was hit for a four and a six by Danielle Wyatt. As the pitch was not providing as much assistance to spin bowling, Australia switched to their pace bowlers to control the innings. Wyatt was dropped twice in short succession; first Haynes could only get her fingertips to the ball, and then wicket-keeper Healy could not hold onto a thick outside-edge. Ultimately, it was England's other opener, Beaumont, who fell for the first wicket, caught by Villani from the bowling of Schutt for four runs. Jones was run out the following over by a direct hit from Georgia Wareham at midwicket. At the end of the powerplay, England were 36 for two from their six overs. Perry took her 100th wicket in Twenty20 Internationals in the next over, trapping Sciver leg before wicket. Sciver reviewed the decision, but TV replays showed it to be correct, and she was out, having only scored one run. Wyatt was dropped for the third time in the eighth over; she struck the ball hard back to the bowler, but it went through Kimmince's hands. At the end of the tenth over, England had reached 57 for three; Wyatt was on 38, alongside Knight on 7.

Wyatt added five more runs in the following over, taking her score to 43, before being caught by Lanning off the bowling of Gardner. Two overs later, Lanning opted to review an lbw decision against Winfield which had been given not out. Neither the bowler nor the wicket-keeper were convinced, but Australia's captain pressed on with the appeal, which revealed Winfield was out. The next ball, Wareham bowled Dunkley, reducing England to 74 for six. England's scoring was limited over the following four overs: they only added ten more runs and lost another wicket; Shrubsole edged the ball to Perry, having scored five runs. England's captain, Knight, remained at the crease, but after hitting her first six of the innings to long on, she was out the next ball, caught by Wareham at mid-off. England lost their final two wickets in the last over, and were bowled out for 105. Only Wyatt and Knight reached double figures for England.

In their reply, Australia started quickly; in the second over, bowled by Shrubsole, Healy hit three boundaries. She continued to score quickly, but was bowled by Ecclestone in the fifth over for 22. Despite being her lowest total of the tournament, Healy had scored at quicker than a-run-a-ball and had contributed the majority of the 29-run opening partnership. Mooney added eight more runs to her own score before she was caught behind by Jones for 14 runs. Writing in The Guardian, Raf Nicholson suggested that "even at 44-2 ... Australia seemed largely in control of the situation." Lanning initially out-scored her batting partner, scoring "two classy boundaries in the 10th over", but then Gardner took over. She struck three sixes in her innings of 33* from 26 deliveries to help Australia to victory by eight wickets with 29 balls remaining. Her all-round performance earned her the player of the match award.

=== Scorecard ===
- Toss: England won the toss and elected to bat first
- Result: Australia won by eight wickets

England batting innings
Batsman	Method of dismissal	Runs	Balls	Strike rate
Danielle Wyatt	c Meg Lanning b Ashleigh Gardner	43	37	116.21
Tammy Beaumont	c Elyse Villani b Megan Schutt	4	9	44.44
Amy Jones †	run out	4	4	100.00
Natalie Sciver	lbw b Ellyse Perry	1	3	33.33
Heather Knight *	c Georgia Wareham b Ashleigh Gardner	25	28	89.28
Lauren Winfield	lbw b Georgia Wareham	6	9	66.66
Sophia Dunkley	b Georgia Wareham	0	1	0.00
Anya Shrubsole	c Ellyse Perry b Ashleigh Gardner	5	11	45.45
Danielle Hazell	lbw b Megan Schutt	6	9	66.66
Sophie Ecclestone	run out	4	6	66.66
Kirstie Gordon	not out	1	1	100.00
Extras	(2 bye, 1 leg byes, 3 wides)	6		
Totals	(19.4 overs, 5.33 runs per over)	105		

Australia bowling
Bowler	Overs	Maidens	Runs	Wickets	Economy
Sophie Molineux	3	0	23	0	7.66
Megan Schutt	3.4	0	13	2	3.54
Ellyse Perry	3	0	23	1	7.66
Delissa Kimmince	3	0	10	0	3.33
Georgia Wareham	3	0	11	2	3.66
Ashleigh Gardner	4	0	22	3	5.50

Australia batting innings
Batsman	Method of dismissal	Runs	Balls	Strike rate
Alyssa Healy †	b Sophie Ecclestone	22	20	110.00
Beth Mooney	c Amy Jones † b Danielle Hazell	14	15	93.33
Ashleigh Gardner	not out	33	26	126.92
Meg Lanning *	not out	28	30	93.33
Extras	(2 leg byes, 7 wides)	9		
Totals	(15.1 overs, 6.98 runs per over)	106/2		
Did not bat: Elyse Villani, Rachael Haynes, Ellyse Perry, Sophie Molineux, Delissa Kimmince, Georgia Wareham, Megan Schutt

England bowling
Bowler	Overs	Maidens	Runs	Wickets	Economy
Natalie Sciver	1.1	0	3	0	2.57
Anya Shrubsole	3	0	30	0	10.00
Sophie Ecclestone	4	0	12	1	3.00
Danielle Hazell	3	0	19	1	6.33
Kirstie Gordon	3	0	30	0	10.00
Heather Knight	1	0	10	0	10.00

Match officials

- On-field umpires: Shaun George and Langton Rusere
- TV umpire: Gregory Brathwaite
- Match referee: Richie Richardson
- Reserve umpire: Nitin Menon

Key

- * – Captain
- † – Wicket-keeper
- c Fielder – Indicates that the batsman was dismissed by a catch by the named fielder
- b Bowler – Indicates which bowler gains credit for the dismissal
- lbw – Indicates the batsman was dismissed leg before wicket

== Aftermath ==
Five finalists were named in the team of the tournament; Jones, Shrubsole and Gordon from England along with Healy and Perry from Australia. Healy, who was the leading run-scorer in the competition, was also named as player of the tournament, and later the ICC Women's Twenty20 International Player of the Year.
