= England women's cricket team in the West Indies in 2016–17 =

International cricket tour

	West Indies women	England women
- Dates: 8 – 19 October 2016
Captains	Stafanie Taylor	Heather Knight

One Day International series
- Results: England women won the 5-match series 3–2
Most runs	Stafanie Taylor (216)	Lauren Winfield (168)
Most wickets	Deandra Dottin (10)	Alex Hartley (13)
- Player of the series: Stafanie Taylor (WI) and Alex Hartley (Eng)

England women's cricket team toured the West Indies in October 2016. The tour consisted of a series of five One Day Internationals with the final three matches of the series being part of the 2014–16 ICC Women's Championship. The England women's training preparations were interrupted because of Hurricane Matthew. Despite the threat of the hurricane, the series went ahead as planned. England women won the 5-match series 3–2.

== Squads ==
West Indies	England
Stafanie Taylor (c); Anisa Mohammed (vc); Merissa Aguilleira; Shemaine Campbelle; Shamilia Connell; Britney Cooper; Deandra Dottin; Afy Fletcher; Erva Giddings; Stacy-Ann King; Hayley Matthews; Shaquana Quintyne; Tremayne Smartt	Heather Knight (c); Anya Shrubsole; Tammy Beaumont; Katherine Brunt; Sophie Ecclestone; Georgia Elwiss; Jenny Gunn; Alexandra Hartley; Danielle Hazell; Amy Jones (wk); Beth Langston; Laura Marsh; Nat Sciver; Lauren Winfield; Danni Wyatt

== ODI series ==
=== 1st ODI ===
8 October 2016
09:30
Scorecard

England; 149 (49.1 overs)	v	West Indies; 144 (44.2 overs)
Danni Wyatt 44 (64); Deandra Dottin 3/21 (5 overs)		Deandra Dottin 28 (41); Katherine Brunt 3/24 (9.2 overs)

England Women won by 5 runs
Trelawny Stadium, Montego Bay
Umpires: Gregory Brathwaite (WI) and Nigel Duguid (WI)
Player of the match: Danni Wyatt (Eng)

- England Women won the toss and elected to bat.
- Erva Giddings (WI) and Sophie Ecclestone (Eng) both made their ODI debuts.

=== 2nd ODI ===
10 October 2016
09:30
Scorecard

West Indies; 148 (50 overs)	v	England; 110 (41.4 overs)
Stafanie Taylor 56 (86); Alexandra Hartley 4/31 (10 overs)		Nat Sciver 27 (43); Deandra Dottin 4/19 (6.4 overs)

West Indies Women won by 38 runs
Trelawny Stadium, Montego Bay
Umpires: Jacqueline Williams (WI) and Nigel Duguid (WI)
Player of the match: Deandra Dottin (WI)

- West Indies Women won the toss and elected to bat.

=== 3rd ODI ===
ICC Women's Championship
14 October 2016
Scorecard

England; 220 (49.5 overs)	v	West Indies; 108 (35.4 overs)
Lauren Winfield 79 (111); Shaquana Quintyne 3/36 (8.5 overs)		Shaquana Quintyne 21 (54); Jenny Gunn 2/8 (5 overs)

England Women won by 112 runs
Sabina Park, Kingston
Umpires: Gregory Brathwaite (WI) and Nigel Duguid (WI)
Player of the match: Lauren Winfield (Eng)

- England Women won the toss and elected to bat.
- ICC Women's Championship points: West Indies Women 0, England Women 2.

=== 4th ODI ===
ICC Women's Championship
16 October 2016
Scorecard

West Indies; 223/6 (50 overs)	v	England; 181 (44.2 overs)
Stafanie Taylor 85 (129); Nat Sciver 1/13 (4 overs)		Tammy Beaumont 57 (64); Stafanie Taylor 3/22 (10 overs)

West Indies Women won by 42 runs
Sabina Park, Kingston
Umpires: Gregory Brathwaite (WI) and Jacqueline Williams (WI)
Player of the match: Stafanie Taylor (WI)

- West Indies Women won the toss and elected to bat.
- ICC Women's Championship points: West Indies Women 2, England Women 0.

=== 5th ODI ===
ICC Women's Championship
19 October 2016
Scorecard

West Indies; 155 (47.1 overs)	v	England; 158/5 (38.5 overs)
Stafanie Taylor 57 (101); Alex Hartley 4/24 (10 overs)		Nat Sciver 58* (74); Afy Fletcher 2/28 (10 overs)

England Women won by 5 wickets
Sabina Park, Kingston
Umpires: Gregory Brathwaite (WI) and Nigel Duguid (WI)
Player of the match: Alex Hartley (Eng)

- West Indies Women won the toss and elected to bat.
- ICC Women's Championship points: West Indies Women 0, England Women 2.
