= 2017 Loughborough Lightning (women's cricket) season =

Loughborough Lightning
2017 season
- Coach: Salliann Briggs
- Captain: Georgia Elwiss
- Overseas player: Kristen Beams; Ellyse Perry; Elyse Villani
- WCSL: Group Stage, 4th
- Most runs: Ellyse Perry (182)
- Most wickets: Beth Langston (6)
- Most catches: Elyse Villani (4)
- Most wicket-keeping dismissals: Abigail Freeborn (1)

The 2017 season was Loughborough Lightning's second season, in which they competed in the Women's Cricket Super League, a Twenty20 competition. The side finished fourth in the group stage, winning two of their five matches.

The side was coached by Salliann Briggs and captained by Georgia Elwiss. They played one of their home matches at the Haslegrave Ground, and the other at the County Ground, Derby.

== Squad ==
Loughborough Lightning's 15-player squad is listed below. Age given is at the start of Loughborough Lightning's first match of the season (12 August 2017).

Name	Nationality	Birth date	Batting style	Bowling style	Notes
Batters
Georgie Boyce	England	4 October 1998 (aged 18)	Right-handed	Right-arm medium	
Marie Kelly	England	9 February 1996 (aged 21)	Right-handed	Right-arm medium	
Elyse Villani	Australia	6 October 1989 (aged 27)	Right-handed	Right-arm medium	Overseas player
All-rounders
Thea Brookes	England	15 February 1993 (aged 24)	Right-handed	Right-arm off break	
Georgia Elwiss	England	31 May 1991 (aged 26)	Right-handed	Right-arm medium	Captain
Sarah Glenn	England	27 February 1999 (aged 18)	Right-handed	Right arm leg break	
Ellyse Perry	Australia	1 November 1990 (aged 26)	Right-handed	Right-arm medium	Overseas player
Paige Scholfield	England	19 December 1995 (aged 21)	Right-handed	Right-arm medium	
Wicket-keepers
Abigail Freeborn	England	12 November 1996 (aged 20)	Right-handed	—	
Amy Jones	England	13 June 1993 (aged 24)	Right-handed	—	
Bowlers
Kristen Beams	Australia	6 November 1984 (aged 32)	Right-handed	Right-arm leg break	Overseas player
Rebecca Grundy	England	12 July 1990 (aged 27)	Left-handed	Slow left-arm orthodox	
Lucy Higham	England	17 October 1997 (aged 19)	Right-handed	Right-arm off break	
Beth Langston	England	6 September 1992 (aged 24)	Right-handed	Right-arm medium	
Sonia Odedra	England	3 June 1988 (aged 29)	Right-handed	Right-arm medium	

== Women's Cricket Super League ==
=== Season standings ===
Pos	Team	Pld	W	L	T	NR	BP	Pts	NRR
1	Southern Vipers	5	4	1	0	0	4	20	2.001
2	Surrey Stars	5	4	1	0	0	2	18	0.291
3	Western Storm	5	3	2	0	0	0	12	−0.887
4	Loughborough Lightning	5	2	3	0	0	2	10	0.664
5	Yorkshire Diamonds	5	2	3	0	0	0	8	−0.318
6	Lancashire Thunder	5	0	5	0	0	0	0	−1.692

Source: ESPN Cricinfo

Advanced to the Final.
Advanced to the Semi-final.

=== League stage ===
12 August 2017
12:00
Scorecard

Loughborough Lightning; 108/9 (20 overs)	v	Western Storm; 109/5 (19.1 overs)
Ellyse Perry 25 (28); Stafanie Taylor 4/5 (4 overs)		Stafanie Taylor 34 (32); Georgia Elwiss 2/24 (4 overs)

Western Storm won by 5 wickets
County Ground, Taunton
Umpires: Ian Blackwell and Nick Cook
Player of the match: Stafanie Taylor (Western Storm)

- Western Storm won the toss and elected to field.
- Points: Western Storm 4, Loughborough Lightning 0

15 August 2017
14:30
Scorecard

Southern Vipers; 180/2 (20 overs)	v	Loughborough Lightning; 134 (20 overs)
Suzie Bates 119* (72); Lucy Higham 1/29 (4 overs)		Georgia Elwiss 32 (29); Suzie Bates 3/15 (3 overs)

Southern Vipers won by 46 runs
County Ground, Derby
Umpires: Steve O'Shaugnessy and Martin Saggers
Player of the match: Suzie Bates (Southern Vipers)

- Loughborough Lightning won the toss and elected to field.
- Points: Southern Vipers 5, Loughborough Lightning 0

18 August 2017
16:00
Scorecard

Yorkshire Diamonds; 110/5 (13 overs)	v	Loughborough Lightning; 93/5 (13 overs)
Chamari Atapattu 66* (40); Kristen Beams 1/18 (3 overs)		Georgia Elwiss 41 (28); Chamari Atapattu 2/11 (3 overs)

Yorkshire Diamonds won by 17 runs
Haslegrave Ground, Loughborough
Umpires: James Middlebrook and Mark Newell
Player of the match: Chamari Atapattu (Yorkshire Diamonds)

- Loughborough Lightning won the toss and elected to field.
- Match reduced to 13 overs per side due to rain.
- Points: Yorkshire Diamonds 4, Loughborough Lightning 0

20 August 2017
14:30
Scorecard

Loughborough Lightning; 140/5 (20 overs)	v	Lancashire Thunder; 90 (17.2 overs)
Ellyse Perry 78* (57); Danielle Hazell 2/16 (4 overs)		Amy Satterthwaite 21 (23); Beth Langston 3/14 (2 overs)

Loughborough Lightning won by 50 runs
Stanley Park, Blackpool
Umpires: Ian Blackwell and Chris Watts
Player of the match: Ellyse Perry (Loughborough Lightning)

- Loughborough Lightning won the toss and elected to bat.
- Points: Loughborough Lightning 5, Lancashire Thunder 0

26 August 2017
14:30
Scorecard

Loughborough Lightning; 171/3 (20 overs)	v	Surrey Stars; 90 (18 overs)
Elyse Villani 71 (39); Laura Marsh 2/29 (4 overs)		Nat Sciver 24 (18); Sarah Glenn 2/5 (3 overs)

Loughborough Lightning won by 81 runs
The Oval, London
Umpires: James Middlebrook and Paul Pollard
Player of the match: Ellyse Perry (Loughborough Lightning)

- Loughborough Lightning won the toss and elected to bat.
- Points: Loughborough Lightning 5, Surrey Stars 0

== Statistics ==
=== Batting ===
Player	Matches	Innings	NO	Runs	HS	Average	Strike rate	100s	50s	4s	6s
Kristen Beams	5	2	2	9	7*	–	81.81	0	0	0	0
Thea Brookes	5	5	1	48	24	12.00	137.14	0	0	3	3
Georgia Elwiss	5	5	0	85	41	17.00	102.40	0	0	9	1
Abigail Freeborn	2	1	1	16	16*	–	114.28	0	0	2	0
Sarah Glenn	4	4	1	58	25	19.33	113.72	0	0	4	3
Rebecca Grundy	5	1	0	12	12	12.00	150.00	0	0	2	0
Lucy Higham	5	2	0	6	6	3.00	75.00	0	0	0	0
Amy Jones	3	3	0	34	21	11.33	121.42	0	0	7	0
Marie Kelly	1	1	0	18	18	18.00	60.00	0	0	1	0
Beth Langston	5	2	0	11	8	5.50	57.89	0	0	1	0
Sonia Odedra	5	4	1	27	20*	9.00	60.00	0	0	1	1
Ellyse Perry	5	5	2	182	78*	60.66	120.52	0	2	16	6
Paige Scholfield	1	1	0	15	15	15.00	65.21	0	0	1	0
Elyse Villani	4	4	0	84	71	21.00	155.55	0	1	12	3
Source: ESPN Cricinfo

=== Bowling ===
Player	Matches	Innings	Overs	Maidens	Runs	Wickets	BBI	Average	Economy	Strike rate
Kristen Beams	5	5	17.0	0	73	3	1/10	24.33	4.29	34.0
Georgia Elwiss	5	5	13.0	0	102	4	2/24	25.50	7.84	19.5
Sarah Glenn	4	2	5.0	0	13	4	2/5	3.25	2.60	7.5
Rebecca Grundy	5	5	11.0	0	84	4	2/11	21.00	7.63	16.5
Lucy Higham	5	5	10.0	0	73	2	1/16	36.50	7.30	30.0
Beth Langston	5	5	13.0	1	84	6	3/14	14.00	6.46	13.0
Sonia Odedra	5	3	5.2	0	50	2	1/9	25.00	9.37	16.0
Ellyse Perry	5	5	13.1	1	79	4	2/9	19.75	6.00	19.7
Source: ESPN Cricinfo

=== Fielding ===
Player	Matches	Innings	Catches
Kristen Beams	5	5	0
Thea Brookes	5	5	0
Georgia Elwiss	5	5	0
Sarah Glenn	4	4	0
Rebecca Grundy	5	5	0
Lucy Higham	5	5	3
Marie Kelly	1	1	0
Beth Langston	5	5	1
Sonia Odedra	5	5	3
Ellyse Perry	5	5	1
Paige Scholfield	1	1	1
Elyse Villani	4	4	4
Source: ESPN Cricinfo

=== Wicket-keeping ===
Player	Matches	Innings	Catches	Stumpings
Abigail Freeborn	2	2	0	1
Amy Jones	3	3	0	0
Source: ESPN Cricinfo
