= New Zealand women's cricket team in Australia in 2012–13 =

International cricket tour

	Australia women	New Zealand women
- Dates: 12 December 2012 – 24 January 2013
Captains	Jodie Fields	Suzie Bates

One Day International series
- Results: Australia women won the 4-match series 3–1
Most runs	Meg Lanning (300)	Suzie Bates (274)
Most wickets	Erin Osborne (5)	Morna Nielsen (5)
- Player of the series: Amy Satterthwaite (NZL)

Twenty20 International series
- Results: New Zealand women won the 3-match series 2–1
Most runs	Meg Lanning (140)	Suzie Bates (141)
Most wickets	Ellyse Perry (4)	Frances Mackay (4)
- Player of the series: Meg Lanning (AUS)

The New Zealand women's cricket team played against Australia women's cricket team in December 2012 and January 2013. The tour consisted of four Women's One Day Internationals (WODIs) in which the Rose Bowl was contested for and three Women's Twenty20 Internationals (WT20Is). On 28 November 2012, Cricket Australia announced a 13-member squad for the one-day series. On the same day, New Zealand Women named their 14-member squad for the one-day series including the recall of wicket-keeper Rachel Priest. Australia's WT20I squad was announced on the eve of the series on 21 January 2013 and New Zealand naming their WT20I squad on 17 January 2013.

The WODI matches were played across Sydney with the first match being played at the Sydney Cricket Ground and the other three matches being played at North Sydney Oval. The WT20I Series took place in Melbourne with all matches being played at Junction Oval in St. Kilda

New Zealand won the first WODI, with captain Suzie Bates scoring her 3rd century in WODIs. Australia came back to win the following three matches, winning the series 3-1, making it their 4th consecutive Rose Bowl victory. The WT20I series was won by New Zealand 2-1. After New Zealand won the first game by 6 wickets, Australia then levelled the series 1 all following a last-over victory. New Zealand went on to win the final game by 7 wickets and hence win the series.

== Squads ==
WODIs		WT20Is	
Australia	New Zealand	Australia	New Zealand
Jodie Fields (c), (wk); Alex Blackwell (vc); Jess Cameron; Sarah Coyte; Rachael Haynes; Alyssa Healy (wk); Jess Jonassen; Meg Lanning; Sharon Millanta; Erin Osborne; Ellyse Perry; Leah Poulton; Lisa Sthalekar	Suzie Bates (c); Amy Satterthwaite (vc); Erin Bermingham; Nicola Browne; Rachel Candy; Sophie Devine; Lucy Doolan; Frances Mackay; Katey Martin (wk); Sara McGlashan; Morna Nielsen; Katie Perkins; Rachel Priest (wk); Sian Ruck	Jodie Fields (c) (wk); Alex Blackwell (vc); Jess Duffin; Renee Chappell; Sarah Coyte; Holly Ferling; Rachael Haynes; Alyssa Healy (wk); Julie Hunter; ~~Jess Jonassen~~; Meg Lanning; Ellyse Perry; Megan Schutt; Lisa Sthalekar	Suzie Bates (c); Amy Satterthwaite (vc); Nicola Browne; Rachel Candy; Sophie Devine; Natalie Dodd; Lucy Doolan; Frances Mackay; Sara McGlashan; Morna Nielsen; Katie Perkins; Rachel Priest (wk); Sian Ruck; Lea Tahuhu

Australia's Jess Jonassen was ruled out of the three-match T20I, due to a knee injury and hence was also ruled out of the 2013 Women's Cricket World Cup that was to be held later that year. She was replaced by Renee Chappell for the rest of the series.

== WODI series ==
=== 1st WODI ===
12 December 2012
10:00
Scorecard

Australia; 248 (48.1 overs)	v	New Zealand; 252/2 (44.5 overs)
Meg Lanning 87 (71); Rachel Candy 4/35 (9 overs)		Suzie Bates 122 (131); Meg Lanning 1/30 (4 overs)

New Zealand Women won by 8 wickets
Sydney Cricket Ground, Sydney
Umpires: Bruce Oxenford (Aus), Nathan Johnstone (Aus)
Player of the match: Suzie Bates (NZ)

- Australia Women won the toss and elected to bat first

=== 2nd WODI ===
14 December 2012
10:00
Scorecard

New Zealand; 288/6 (50 overs)	v	Australia; 289/6 (46.4 overs)
Amy Satterthwaite 109 (119); Sarah Coyte 2/55 (10 overs)		Meg Lanning 72 (53); Morna Nielsen 3/36 (10 overs)

Australia Women won by 4 wickets
North Sydney Oval, Sydney
Umpires: Bruce Oxenford (Aus), Richard Patterson (Aus)
Player of the match: Amy Satterthwaite (NZ)

- Australia Women won the toss and elected to field first

=== 3rd WODI ===
17 December 2012
10:00
Scorecard

New Zealand; 177 (45.4 overs)	v	Australia; 178/1 (21.2 overs)
Nicola Browne 42 (62); Erin Osborne 3/32 (10 overs)		Meg Lanning 102 (50); Nicola Browne 1/41 (4 Overs)

Australia Women won by 9 wickets
North Sydney Oval, Sydney
Umpires: Bruce Oxenford (Aus), Nathan Johnstone (Aus)
Player of the match: Meg Lanning (Aus)

- Australia Women won the toss and elected to field first
- Megan Schutt (Aus) made her WODI debut

=== 4th ODI ===
19 December 2012
10:00
Scorecard

Australia; 267/9 (50 Overs)	v	New Zealand; 260/8 (50 overs)
Jess Duffin 66 (56); Lea Tahuhu 3/47 (10 overs)		Nicola Browne 63 (71); Megan Schutt 2/43 (10 overs)

Australia Women won by 7 runs
North Sydney Oval, Sydney
Umpires: Bruce Oxenford (Aus), Richard Patterson (Aus)
Player of the match: Amy Satterthwaite (NZ)

- Australia Women won the toss and elected to bat first

== WT20I Series ==
=== 1st WT20I ===
20 January 2013
Scorecard

Australia; 151/7 (20 overs)	v	New Zealand; 152/4 (19.4 overs)
Meg Lanning 76 (56); Morna Nielsen 2/25 (4 overs)		Suzie Bates 42 (38); Ellyse Perry 2/21 (4 overs)

New Zealand Women won by 6 wickets
Junction Oval, Melbourne
Umpires: Geoff Joshua (Aus), Kathy Cross (NZ)
Player of the match: Meg Lanning (Aus)

- New Zealand Women won the toss and elected to field first
- Megan Schutt and Renee Chappell (Aus) made their WT20I debut.

=== 2nd WT20I ===
22 January 2013
Scorecard

New Zealand; 132/6 (20 overs)	v	Australia; 135/5 (19.5 overs)
Amy Satterthwaite 44 (41); Megan Schutt 2/20 (3 overs)		Meg Lanning 64 (56); Sian Ruck 2/17 (3 overs)

Australia Women won by 5 wickets
Junction Oval, Melbourne
Umpires: Geoff Joshua (Aus), Kathy Cross (NZ)
Player of the match: Meg Lanning (Aus)

- New Zealand Women won the toss and elected to bat first

=== 3rd WT20I ===
24 January 2013
Scorecard

Australia; 134/5 (20 overs)	v	New Zealand; 136/3 (18.1 overs)
Jess Duffin 48 (36); Morna Nielsen 1/9 (4 overs)		Suzie Bates 67 (44); Ellyse Perry 1/32 (4 overs)

New Zealand Women won by 7 wickets
Junction Oval, Melbourne
Umpires: Ashley Barrow (Aus), Kathy Cross (NZ)
Player of the match: Suzie Bates (NZ)

- New Zealand Women won the toss and elected to field first
