= 2010 Women's World Twenty20 =

2nd edition of the Women's T20 World Cup

- Dates: 5 – 16 May 2010
- Administrator: International Cricket Council
- Cricket format: Women's Twenty20 International
- Tournament format(s): Group stage and Knockout
- Host: West Indies
- Champions: Australia (1st title)
- Runners-up: New Zealand
- Participants: 8
- Matches: 15
- Player of the series: (New Zealand) Nicola Browne
- Most runs: (New Zealand) Sara McGlashan (147)
- Most wickets: (India) Diana David (9) (New Zealand) Nicola Browne (9)
- Official website: icc-cricket.yahoo.net

The 2010 Women's World Twenty20 was the second Women's World Twenty20 competition, which was held in the West Indies from 5 to 16 May 2010. The group stage matches were played at the Warner Park Sporting Complex on Saint Kitts. It was won by Australia, who defeated New Zealand in the final. New Zealand's Nicola Browne was named as Player of the Tournament.

== Groups ==
Group A	Group B
England (1); Australia (3); West Indies (5); South Africa (7)	New Zealand (2); India (4); Sri Lanka (6); Pakistan (8)

== Matches ==
=== Group stage ===
==== Group A ====
Pos	Team	Pld	W	L	NR	Pts	NRR
1	Australia	3	3	0	0	6	0.550
2	West Indies	3	2	1	0	4	0.167
3	England	3	1	2	0	2	0.900
4	South Africa	3	0	3	0	0	−1.617

Source: ESPNCricinfo

5 May
Scorecard

West Indies; 175/5 (20 overs)	v	South Africa; 158/4 (20 overs)
Deandra Dottin 112* (45); Chloe Tryon 2/28 (3 overs)		Shandre Fritz 58 (52); Pamela Lavine 1/14 (2 overs)

West Indies won by 17 runs
Warner Park, Basseterre, Saint Kitts and Nevis
Umpires: Asoka de Silva (SL) and Rod Tucker (Aus)
Player of the match: Deandra Dottin (WI)

- South Africa won the toss and elected to field.

5 May
Scorecard

England; 104 (17.3 overs)	v	Australia; 104 (19.4 overs)
Sarah Taylor 46 (44); Lisa Sthalekar 3/29 (4 overs)		Leah Poulton 23 (28); Nicki Shaw 2/10 (3 overs)

Match Tied (Australia won the Super Over)
Warner Park, Basseterre, Saint Kitts and Nevis
Umpires: Marais Erasmus (SA) and Shavir Tarapore (Ind)
Player of the match: Lisa Sthalekar (Aus)

- England won the toss and elected to bat.
- Super Over: Australia 6/2; England 6/2
- Scores were tied in the Super Over; Australia won on count-back of sixes in the match (1–0).

7 May
Scorecard

Australia; 155 (19.3 overs)	v	South Africa; 131/7 (20 overs)
Shelley Nitschke 44 (32); Sunette Loubser 3/22 (4 overs)		Mignon du Preez 53* (46); Shelley Nitschke 2/21 (4 overs)

Australia won by 24 runs
Warner Park, Basseterre, Saint Kitts and Nevis
Umpires: Asad Rauf (Pak) and Shavir Tarapore (Ind)
Player of the match: Shelley Nitschke (Aus)

- South Africa won the toss and elected to field.

7 May
Scorecard

West Indies; 122/8 (20 overs)	v	England; 120/9 (20 overs)
Juliana Nero 32 (36); Laura Marsh 3/17 (4 overs)		Sarah Taylor 33 (25); Anisa Mohammed 2/9 (4 overs)

West Indies won by 2 runs
Warner Park, Basseterre, Saint Kitts and Nevis
Umpires: Tony Hill (NZ) and Rod Tucker (Aus)
Player of the match: Anisa Mohammed (WI)

- England won the toss and elected to field.

9 May
Scorecard

England; 141/6 (20 overs)	v	South Africa; 85 (17 overs)
Lydia Greenway 34* (22); Angelique Taai 1/9 (1 over)		Cri-Zelda Brits 20 (23); Danni Wyatt 4/11 (3 overs)

England won by 56 runs
Warner Park, Basseterre, Saint Kitts and Nevis
Umpires: Asad Rauf (Pak) and Shavir Tarapore (Ind)
Player of the match: Danni Wyatt (Eng)

- England won the toss and elected to bat.

9 May
Scorecard

Australia; 133/7 (20 overs)	v	West Indies; 124/7 (20 overs)
Alex Blackwell 28 (26); Anisa Mohammed 3/17 (4 overs)		Stafanie Taylor 58* (54); Ellyse Perry 2/19 (3 overs)

Australia won by 9 runs
Warner Park, Basseterre, Saint Kitts and Nevis
Umpires: Marais Erasmus (SA) and Tony Hill (NZ)
Player of the match: Stafanie Taylor (WI)

- West Indies won the toss and elected to field.

==== Group B ====
Pos	Team	Pld	W	L	NR	Pts	NRR
1	New Zealand	3	3	0	0	6	2.514
2	India	3	2	1	0	4	1.422
3	Sri Lanka	3	1	2	0	2	−1.950
4	Pakistan	3	0	3	0	0	−1.733

Source: ESPNCricinfo

6 May
Scorecard

Sri Lanka; 108 (19.3 overs)	v	Pakistan; 107 (20 overs)
Inoka Galagedara 25 (28); Nida Dar 2/10 (2 overs)		Bismah Maroof 42 (41); Eshani Kaushalya 2/30 (4 overs)

Sri Lanka won by 1 run
Warner Park, Basseterre, Saint Kitts and Nevis
Umpires: Marais Erasmus (SA) and Rod Tucker (Aus)
Player of the match: Bismah Maroof (Pak)

- Sri Lanka won the toss and elected to bat.

6 May
Scorecard

New Zealand; 139/8 (20 overs)	v	India; 129/8 (20 overs)
Suzie Bates 32 (30); Diana David 4/27 (4 overs)		Mithali Raj 44 (36); Sian Ruck 2/17 (4 overs)

New Zealand won by 10 runs
Warner Park, Basseterre, Saint Kitts and Nevis
Umpires: Asad Rauf (Pak) and Asoka de Silva (SL)
Player of the match: Suzie Bates (NZ)

- New Zealand won the toss and elected to bat.

8 May
Scorecard

Pakistan; 104/6 (20 overs)	v	India; 106/1 (16.4 overs)
Sana Mir 35 (41); Priyanka Roy 3/19 (4 overs)		Poonam Raut 54* (54)

India won by 9 wickets
Warner Park, Basseterre, Saint Kitts and Nevis
Umpires: Marais Erasmus (SA) and Tony Hill (NZ)
Player of the match: Poonam Raut (Ind)

- Pakistan won the toss and elected to bat.

8 May
Scorecard

New Zealand; 154/7 (20 overs)	v	Sri Lanka; 107/8 (20 overs)
Suzie Bates 50 (43); Chamani Seneviratna 4/21 (4 overs)		Suwini de Alwis 26 (24); Erin Bermingham 2/15 (4 overs)

New Zealand won by 47 runs
Warner Park, Basseterre, Saint Kitts and Nevis
Umpires: Asad Rauf (Pak) and Marais Erasmus (SA)
Player of the match: Suzie Bates (NZ)

- New Zealand won the toss and elected to bat.

10 May
Scorecard

Pakistan; 65/9 (20 overs)	v	New Zealand; 71/4 (8.2 overs)
Sania Khan 15 (28); Nicola Browne 4/15 (4 overs)		Sophie Devine 23 (15); Sadia Yousuf 2/9 (2 overs)

New Zealand won by 6 wickets
Warner Park, Basseterre, Saint Kitts and Nevis
Umpires: Asoka de Silva (SL) and Shavir Tarapore (Ind)
Player of the match: Nicola Browne (NZ)

- Pakistan won the toss and elected to bat.

10 May
Scorecard

India; 144/3 (20 overs)	v	Sri Lanka; 73/9 (20 overs)
Sulakshana Naik 59 (54); Udeshika Prabodhani 1/15 (2 overs)		Deepika Rasangika 31* (44); Diana David 4/12 (4 overs)

India won by 71 runs
Warner Park, Basseterre, Saint Kitts and Nevis
Umpires: Marais Erasmus (SA) and Rod Tucker (Aus)
Player of the match: Sulakshana Naik (Ind)

- India won the toss and elected to bat.

=== Knockout stage ===
Semi-finals
13 May – Beausejour Stadium, Gros Islet, St Lucia
Australia	123/3 (18.5)
India	119/5 (20.0)
14 May – Beausejour Stadium, Gros Islet, St Lucia
New Zealand	180/5 (20.0)
West Indies	124/8 (20.0)

Final
16 May – Kensington Oval, Bridgetown, Barbados
Australia	106/8 (20.0)
New Zealand	103/6 (20.0)

==== Semi-finals ====
13 May
Scorecard

India; 119/5 (20 overs)	v	Australia; 123/3 (18.5 overs)
Poonam Raut 44 (51); Ellyse Perry 1/19 (4 overs)		Alex Blackwell 61 (49); Priyanka Roy 2/27 (4 overs)

Australia won by 7 wickets
Beausejour, Gros Islet, St Lucia
Umpires: Marais Erasmus (SA) and Tony Hill (NZ)
Player of the match: Alex Blackwell (Aus)

- India won the toss and elected to bat.

14 May
Scorecard

New Zealand; 180/5 (20 overs)	v	West Indies; 124/8 (20 overs)
Sara McGlashan 84 (55); Shakera Selman 2/27 (4 overs)		Stafanie Taylor 40 (33); Aimee Watkins 3/26 (4 overs)

New Zealand won by 56 runs
Beausejour, Gros Islet, St Lucia
Umpires: Asoka de Silva (SL) and Rod Tucker (Aus)
Player of the match: Sara McGlashan (NZ)

- West Indies won the toss and elected to field.

==== Final ====
16 May
Scorecard

Australia; 106/8 (20 overs)	v	New Zealand; 103/6 (20 overs)
Leah Poulton 20 (28); Nicola Browne 2/11 (4 overs)		Sophie Devine 38* (35); Ellyse Perry 3/18 (4 overs)

Australia won by 3 runs
Kensington Oval, Bridgetown, Barbados
Attendance: 8,332
Umpires: Asoka de Silva (SL) and Marais Erasmus (SA)
Player of the match: Ellyse Perry (Aus)

- Australia won the toss and elected to bat.

After Australia captain Alex Blackwell elected to bat, New Zealand started effectively. Their opening fast bowler Nicola Browne bowled her quota of four overs straight through, taking 2/11. She removed opener Elyse Villani, for six, caught at cover. Blackwell was then out for 0, cutting into the hands of Sophie Devine in the gully. Shelley Nitschke had earlier been trapped leg before wicket by Sian Ruck for three. This was following by a partnership of 30 between Leah Poulton and Jess Cameron, but they were unable to lift the run rate substantially; their stand took 45 balls. Poulton was out trying to loft a ball over cover, and two balls later, Cameron was bowled from Kate Broadmore's first ball, leaving Australia at 5/51 in the 13th over. Only Poulton managed a solitary boundary. Wicket-keeper Alyssa Healy scored 10 from as many balls, but was then run out attempting a second run after being dropped by Sara McGlashan.

The total was boosted by Sarah Elliott, who made 19 not out from 20 balls, and Lisa Sthalekar (18 off 13), putting on 27 from 22 balls. Sthalekar was bowled by Devine after moving across outside off stump and trying to paddle scoop the ball down to fine leg. The innings ended with a one-handed catch by New Zealand captain Aimee Watkins, who leapt high at cover to prevent a drive from Rene Farrell going for four.

New Zealand started their chase solidly. Suzie Bates pulled the first ball of the innings for two and hit a six over long-on in the second over, bowled by Rene Farrell. However, in the fourth over, but Watkins' pull from the bowling of Clea Smith was taken by a leaping Blackwell at midwicket. In the next over Blackwell ran out McGlashan for 1, after the latter had been in a mix-up with Bates, leaving New Zealand at 2/19. In the next over Bates tried to pull Ellyse Perry down the ground and was caught by Elliott, who ran across from mid-off. The following over, Perry uprooted Amy Satterthwaite's off stump with a ball that kept low and New Zealand were in trouble at 4/29 in the seventh over.

For the next 21 balls, the new batters Devine and Rachel Priest struggled to score, accumulating only seven runs in this period. At this time, the spin of Nitschke (1/10) and Sthalekar (0/19) contained the New Zealand batting. During this phase, Priest was given out stumped by Healy after the television umpire Asad Rauf had pressed the wrong button and had to retract his decision. Soon after she hit Nitschke to Blackwell and New Zealand were at 5/36 after 11 overs, leaving them with 71 runs to score from the last 54 balls.

This brought Browne to the crease and she put on 41 from as many balls in partnership with Devine, who ended with 38 not out from 35 balls. However, they could not score quickly, with a total of only two fours and one six. In the 18th over, Browne was caught behind for 20 from Perry. Devine hit a four and a six from the last two balls of the 19th over bowled by Farrell to leave New Zealand requiring 14 runs from the last over, which Perry bowled.

A single from the first ball put Devine on strike, and she hit four consecutive twos. Devine required five runs from the last ball to win and she struck a powerful straight drive. Perry, who has played football for Australia, stuck out her right foot and the ball deflected to mid-on where Sthalekar stopped the ball and only one run was scored. This sealed an Australian win by three runs. Perry was named the player of the match for her 3/18.

== Statistics ==
=== Most runs ===
Player	Matches	Innings	Runs	Average	SR	HS	100	50	4s	6s
(New Zealand) Sara McGlashan	5	5	147	36.75	133.63	84	0	1	11	5
(India) Mithali Raj	4	4	145	72.50	119.83	52*	0	1	16	0
(Australia) Leah Poulton	5	5	127	31.75	105.83	39	0	0	12	2
(Cricket West Indies) Stafanie Taylor	4	4	117	39.00	105.40	58*	0	1	7	5
(Cricket West Indies) Deandra Dottin	4	4	113	37.66	213.20	112*	1	0	7	9

Source: ESPNCricinfo

=== Most wickets ===
Player	Matches	Innings	Wickets	Overs	Econ.	Ave.	BBI	S/R	4WI	5WI
(India) Diana David	4	4	9	16.0	4.18	7.44	4/12	10.6	2	0
(New Zealand) Nicola Browne	5	5	9	16.0	4.81	8.55	4/15	10.6	1	0
(Australia) Ellyse Perry	5	5	8	16.3	5.21	10.75	3/18	12.3	0	0
(New Zealand) Lucy Doolan	5	5	7	18.0	4.55	11.71	2/18	15.4	0	0
(Cricket West Indies) Anisa Mohammed	4	4	6	14.0	5.07	11.83	3/17	14.0	0	0

Source: ESPNCricinfo
