= West Indies women's cricket team record by opponent =

The West Indies women's cricket team represents the West Indies in international women's cricket. The team is governed by Cricket West Indies. They first competed in international cricket in 1976, when they played against Australia in two Test matches.

They recorded their first, and only, Test match victory against India in 1976, as part of a six Test match series. They have played 12 Test matches in their history, against four different opponents, most recently in 2004 against Pakistan.

The West Indies played their first One Day International in 1979, against England. They competed in their first Women's Cricket World Cup in 1993, and reached the final of the tournament in 2013. Overall, they have played 187 ODIs, winning 83 and losing 97.

The side played their first Twenty20 International in 2008, against Ireland. They have appeared at every edition of the ICC Women's T20 World Cup, with the first taking place in 2009. The West Indies won the tournament in 2016, beating Australia in the final. Overall, they have played 141 T20Is, winning 74 and losing 59.

== Key ==
- M – Denotes the number of matches played
- W – Denotes the number of wins for the West Indies against the listed opponent
- L – Denotes the number of losses for the West Indies against the listed opponent
- T – Denotes the number of ties between the West Indies and the listed opponent
- D – Denotes the number of draws between the West Indies and the listed opponent
- NR – Denotes the number of no results between the West Indies and the listed opponent
- Tie+W – Number of matches tied and then won in a tiebreaker such as a bowl-out or Super Over
- Tie+L – Number of matches tied and then lost in a tiebreaker such as a bowl-out or Super Over
- Win% – Win percentage (in ODI and T20I cricket, a tie counts as half a win, and no results are disregarded)
- Loss% – Loss percentage
- Draw% – Draw percentage
- First – Year of the first match between the West Indies and the listed opponent
- Last – Year of the latest match between the West Indies and the listed opponent

== Test cricket ==
West Indies women Test cricket record by opponent
Opponent	M	W	L	D	Win%	Loss%	Draw%	First	Last
Australia	2	0	0	2	0.00	0.00	100.00	1976	1976
England	3	0	2	1	0.00	66.66	33.33	1979	1979
India	6	1	1	4	16.66	16.66	66.66	1976	1976
Pakistan	1	0	0	1	0.00	0.00	100.00	2004	2004
Total	12	1	3	8	8.33	25.00	66.66	1976	2004

== One Day International ==
West Indies women One Day International record by opponent
Opponent	M	W	L	T	NR	Win%	First	Last
Australia	13	1	12	0	0	7.69	1993	2019
Denmark	2	2	0	0	0	100.00	1993	1997
England	22	5	15	0	2	25.00	1979	2019
India	25	5	20	0	0	20.00	1993	2019
Ireland	7	6	1	0	0	85.71	1993	2011
Japan	1	1	0	0	0	100.00	2003	2003
Netherlands	7	6	1	0	0	85.71	1993	2010
New Zealand	19	7	11	0	1	38.88	1993	2018
Pakistan	30	21	9	0	0	70.00	2003	2021
Scotland	1	1	0	0	0	100.00	2003	2003
South Africa	28	10	14	2	2	42.30	2005	2021
Sri Lanka	32	18	14	0	0	56.25	1997	2017
Total	187	83	97	2	5	46.15	1979	2021

== Twenty20 International ==
West Indies women Twenty20 International record by opponent
Opponent	M	W	L	T	Tie+W	Tie+L	NR	Win%	First	Last
Australia	13	1	12	0	0	0	0	7.69	2009	2019
Bangladesh	3	3	0	0	0	0	0	100.00	2014	2018
England	22	8	13	0	1	0	0	38.63	2009	2020
India	18	8	10	0	0	0	0	44.44	2011	2019
Ireland	4	4	0	0	0	0	0	100.00	2008	2019
Netherlands	3	3	0	0	0	0	0	100.00	2008	2010
New Zealand	18	4	12	0	0	1	1	26.47	2009	2018
Pakistan	16	10	3	0	3	0	0	71.87	2011	2021
South Africa	20	14	5	0	0	0	1	73.68	2009	2021
Sri Lanka	23	18	4	0	0	0	1	81.81	2010	2018
Thailand	1	1	0	0	0	0	0	100.00	2020	2020
Total	141	74	59	0	4	1	3	55.43	2008	2021
