= 2013 Women's Cricket World Cup final =

2013 Women's Cricket World Cup Final
- Event: 2013 Women's Cricket World Cup
Australia	West Indies
(Australia)	(Cricket West Indies)
259/7	145
50 overs	43.1 overs
- Australia won by 114 runs
- Date: 17 February 2013
- Venue: Brabourne Stadium, Mumbai
- Player of the match: Jess Cameron (Aus)
- Umpires: Shaun George (SA) and Vineet Kulkarni (Ind)

The 2013 Women's Cricket World Cup Final was a cricket match between the West Indies and Australia played on 17 February 2013 at the Brabourne Stadium in India. It was the culmination of the 2013 Women's Cricket World Cup, the tenth Women's Cricket World Cup.

Australia batted first, making a total of 259 runs for 7 wickets. In response, the West Indies were bowled out for 145, resulting in an Australian victory by 114 runs and securing Australia's sixth World Cup victory.

== Route to the final ==
Australia were drawn in Group B along with Pakistan, New Zealand and South Africa. In their first match, Australia defeated Pakistan by 91 runs, before winning their second match by three wickets (with 26 balls to spare) against South Africa. The final group match saw Australia beat New Zealand by seven wicket, and see them qualify for the Super Six section of the tournament. A narrow two-run victory over England was followed by a nine-wicket win against Sri Lanka and an eight-run defeat by the West Indies.

The West Indies were drawn in Group A along with England (the defending champions), India and Sri Lanka. Despite losing to India and England, they finished in third place in the group and qualified for the Super Six section, where they won all three of their games, against South Africa, New Zealand and Australia, to qualify for the final.

== Final ==
=== Scorecard ===
17 February 2013
14:30 (D/N)
Scorecard

Australia; 259/7 (50 overs)	v	West Indies; 145 (43.1 overs)
Jess Cameron 75 (76); Shaquana Quintyne 3/27 (10 overs)		Merissa Aguilleira 23 (36); Ellyse Perry 3/19 (10 overs)

Australian Women won by 114 runs
Brabourne Stadium, Bombay
Umpires: Shaun George (Rsa) and Vineet Kulkarni (Ind)
Player of the match: Jess Cameron (Australia)

- Australia Women won the toss and elected to bat

=== Australian innings ===
Australia won the toss and chose to bat first. Openers Meg Lanning and Rachael Haynes put on 52 for the first wicket, and Haynes went on to share a stand of 64 with Jess Cameron before being caught off the bowling of Shanel Daley for 52. Jess Cameron then accelerated the scoring, making 75 from 76 balls before also falling to Daley. The West Indies then took further wickets until at 209/7 with fewer than 7 overs left, Australia appeared to have lost their momentum. However Jodie Fields and Ellyse Perry hit 50 more runs off the remaining balls, leaving Australia with a final score of 259/7.

=== West Indies innings ===
The West Indian innings never really got going; openers Kycia Knight and Natasha McLean scored 32 before both being dismissed by Perry, and West Indies quickly found themselves struggling at 57/3, with Kyshona Knight also having retired hurt. Despite contributions from their middle order to reach 109/4, they then lost their next four wickets for five runs and were eventually dismissed for 145, giving Australia a victory by 114 runs.

== Analysis and reaction ==
Most commentators saw Ellyse Perry as the match-winner. Apart from her fast 25 runs in the Australian innings, she then "wrecked West Indies' chase" with her spell of 3/19. Despite the margin of victory, it was pointed out that the result was not unexpected; as ESPN reported "it was no surprise and indeed no shame for West Indies to be outclassed by a team that lost just one of seven games, that too, by eight runs." The West Indies had beaten Australia in the Super Six group stage, but were outclassed in the final; the BBC said that "Australia were too clinical for a West Indies side that were sloppy in the field, wayward with the ball and unable to keep up with the run chase."

== Scorecard ==
=== Australia innings ===
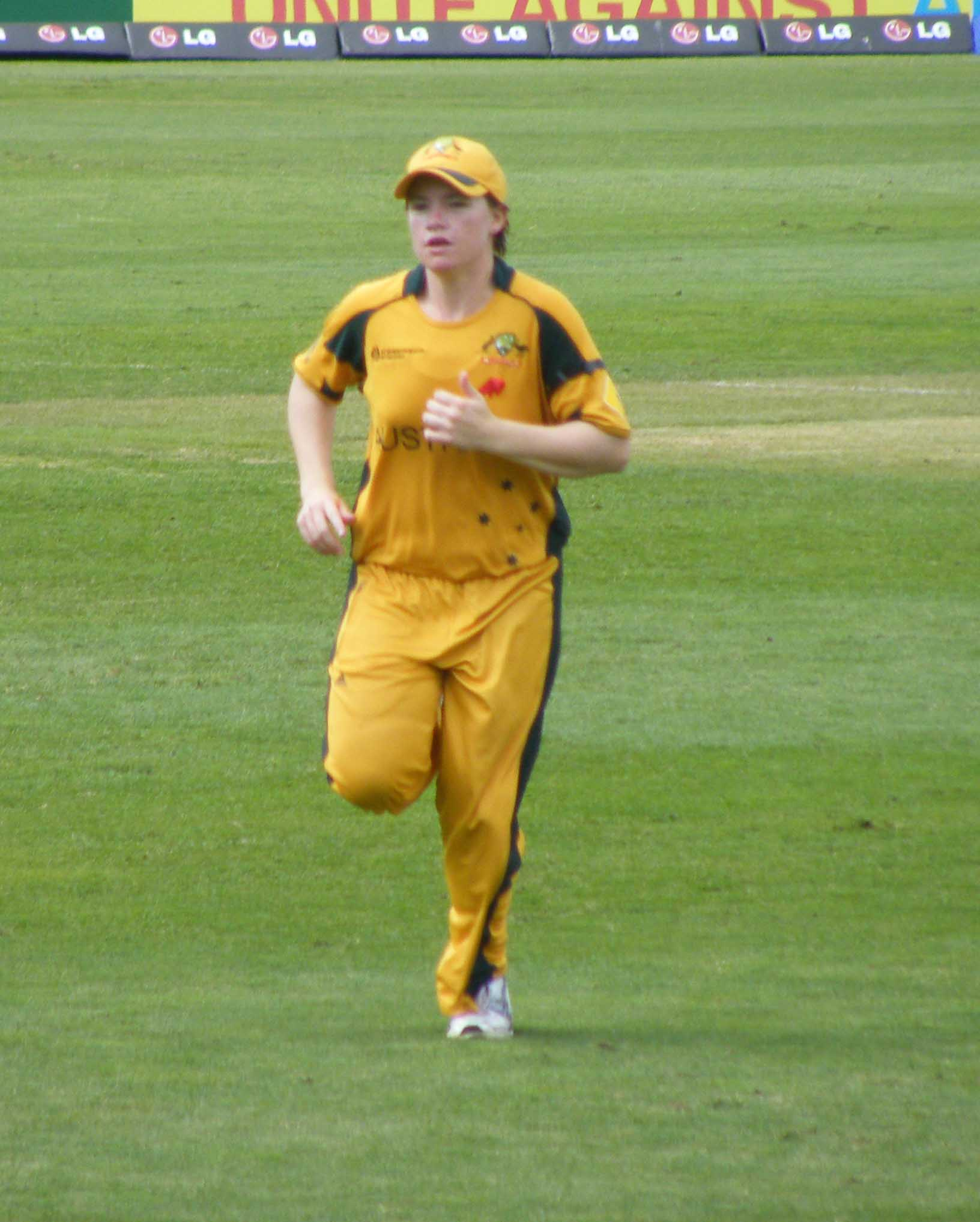
Jess Cameron, who was named player of the match, top-scored for Australia with 75.

Australia batting innings
Batsman	Method of dismissal	Runs	Balls	Strike rate
Meg Lanning	c Kyshona Knight b Taylor	31	41	75.60
Rachael Haynes *	c Kyshona Knight b Quintyne	52	74	70.27
Jess Cameron	c Kyshona Knight b Daley	75	76	98.68
Alex Blackwell	c Aguilleira b Tremayne Smartt	3	9	33.33
Lisa Sthalekar	c Campbelle b Quintyne	12	20	60.00
Sarah Coyte	c Daley b Quintyne	7	12	58.33
Jodie Fields * †	not out	36	38	94.73
Erin Osborne	c Quintyne b Anisa Mohammed	7	12	58.33
Ellyse Perry	not out	25	22	113.63
Julie Hunter	did not bat	–	–	–
Megan Schutt	did not bat	–	–	–
Extras	(3 leg byes, 4 wides, 4 No-ball)	11		
Totals	(50 overs)	259/7		

West Indies bowling
Bowler	Overs	Maidens	Runs	Wickets	Economy
Shanel Daley	10	0	43	1	4.30
Tremayne Smartt	5	0	43	1	8.60
Stafanie Taylor	9	1	44	1	4.88
Shaquana Quintyne	10	1	27	3	2.70
Anisa Mohammed	10	0	61	1	6.10
Kyshona Knight	3	0	23	0	7.66
Shemaine Campbelle	3	0	15	0	5.00

=== West Indies innings ===
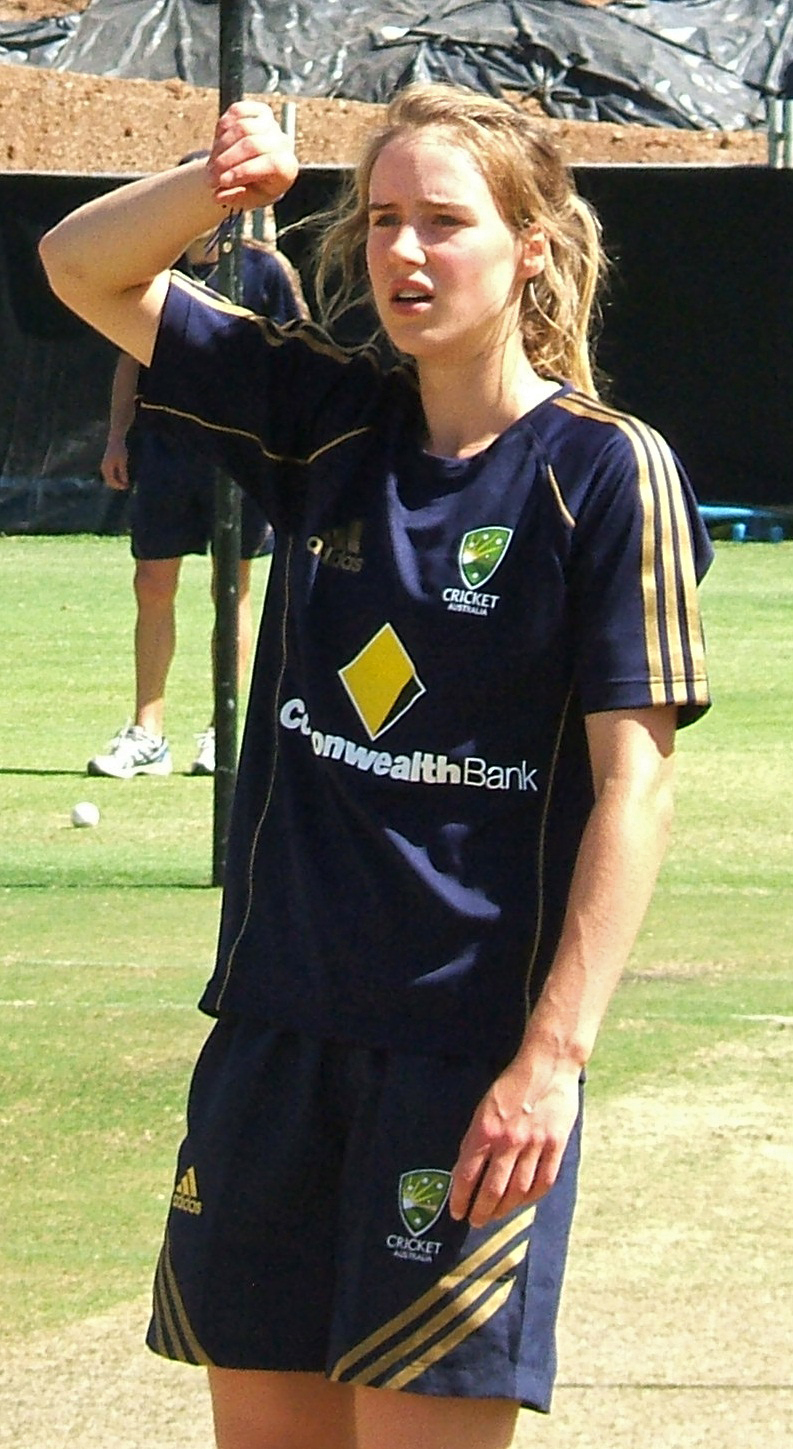
Ellyse Perry took three wickets in the final.

West Indies batting innings
Batsman	Method of dismissal	Runs	Balls	Strike rate
Kycia Knight	lbw b Perry	17	35	48.57
Natasha McLean	lbw b Perry	13	30	43.33
Stafanie Taylor	c&b Perry	5	9	55.55
Kyshona Knight	not out	21	57	36.84
Merissa Aguilleira * †	b Sthalekar	23	36	63.88
Deandra Dottin	b Sthalekar	22	28	78.57
Shemaine Campbelle	c Lanning b Schutt	11	13	84.61
Shanel Daley	c&b Schutt	2	17	11.76
Shaquana Quintyne	c Blackwell b Osborne	2	7	28.57
Anisa Mohammed	c Schutt b Osborne	14	26	53.84
Tremayne Smartt	c Sthalekar b Hunter	0	1	0.00
Extras	(8 leg byes, 6 wides, 1 No-ball)	15		
Totals	(43.1 overs)	145		

Australia bowling
Bowler	Overs	Maidens	Runs	Wickets	Economy
Megan Schutt	10	2	38	2	3.80
Julie Hunter	4.1	1	18	1	4.32
Lisa Sthalekar	10	3	20	2	2.00
Ellyse Perry	10	3	19	3	1.90
Erin Osborne	7	2	26	2	3.71
Sarah Coyte	2	0	15	0	7.50

Key

- * – Captain
- † – Wicket-keeper
- c Fielder – Indicates that the batsman was dismissed by a catch by the named fielder
- b Bowler – Indicates which bowler gains credit for the dismissal
- lbw – Indicates the batsman was dismissed leg before wicket
