= Beth Langston =

English cricketer

Personal information
- Full name: Bethany Alicia Langston
- Born: 6 September 1992 (age 34); Harold Wood, Essex, England
- Batting: Right-handed
- Bowling: Right-arm medium
- Role: Bowler

International information
- National side: England (2013–2016)
- ODI debut (cap 129): 9 November 2016 v Sri Lanka
- Last ODI: 17 November 2016 v Sri Lanka
- ODI shirt no.: 42
- T20I debut (cap 37): 24 October 2013 v West Indies
- Last T20I: 26 October 2013 v West Indies

Domestic team information
- Years: Team
- 2009–2015: Essex
- 2016–present: Yorkshire
- 2016–2017: Loughborough Lightning
- 2016/17–2017/18: Otago
- 2018–2019: Yorkshire Diamonds
- 2020–present: Northern Diamonds
- 2021–2022: Northern Superchargers

Career statistics
| Competition | WODI | WT20I | WLA | WT20 |
|---|---|---|---|---|
| Matches | 4 | 2 | 108 | 95 |
| Runs scored | 21 | – | 1,076 | 735 |
| Batting average | 21.00 | – | 18.55 | 19.34 |
| 100s/50s | 0/0 | – | 0/4 | 0/1 |
| Top score | 21 | – | 96 | 50 |
| Balls bowled | 186 | 48 | 5,234 | 1,598 |
| Wickets | 2 | 1 | 143 | 54 |
| Bowling average | 47.00 | 44.00 | 21.55 | 31.37 |
| 5 wickets in innings | 0 | 0 | 2 | 0 |
| 10 wickets in match | 0 | 0 | 0 | 0 |
| Best bowling | 1/23 | 1/16 | 7/23 | 4/11 |
| Catches/stumpings | 2/– | 1/– | 25/– | 11/– |
- Source: CricketArchive, 5 October 2023

Bethany Alicia Langston (born 6 September 1992) is an English cricketer who played six matches for the England women's cricket team: twice in 2013 and four times in 2016. Predominantly a medium-pace bowler, she began her cricket career with Essex in 2009, before moving to Yorkshire in 2016. She also played in the Women's Cricket Super League for both the Loughborough Lightning and the Yorkshire Diamonds.

== Life and career ==
Bethany Alicia Langston was born on 6 September 1992 in Harold Wood, Essex. She attended Hall Mead School, and started playing cricket at Upminster Cricket Club, where her three older brothers played, and her parents were vice presidents. She later joined Loughton Cricket Club, who had a strong women's team. She made her debut for the Essex team in women's county cricket in 2009. Four years later, she was included in a 21-player "England Women's Performance Squad", and was chosen as a member of the England team to take part in the 2013–14 tour of the West Indies. She played in two Women's Twenty20 Internationals during the tour: the only ones of her career. In the first, a tied match, she opened the bowling for England, and took one wicket. In the second, an eight-wicket loss, she bowled four overs without taking a wicket, while conceding 28 runs.

After her tour of the West Indies, Langston suffered a stress fracture in her back, and although she remained a part of the England set-up, she was not selected as part of a squad again until 2015, when she took part in the England women's academy trip to Dubai to face an equivalent Australian team. She was again part of the academy squad the following year, travelling to Sri Lanka to take part in a tri-series against Australia A and Sri Lanka, during which she claimed eight wickets at an average of 17.12. For the 2016 domestic season, Langston switched from Essex to Yorkshire, a move that she explained as allowing her to keep playing top-level cricket: "Unfortunately, Essex had gone down a couple of divisions and I wanted to try and play first-division cricket."

Later that year, Langston was recalled to the England team for the 2016–17 tour of the West Indies: she was initially expected to have to miss the tour due to a broken thumb, but it healed well, and she was included in the squad. Ultimately, Langston did not play during the tour, but retained her place in the squad for the subsequent visit to Sri Lanka. She made her One Day International debut during the first match of the series, taking one wicket during a large win for England. She made all four of her One Day International appearances during that tour, picking up one more wicket. After the conclusion of the series, she was granted a "rookie contract" with England, which the England coach Mark Robinson said allowed them "to financially support players who sit just above the England Women's senior academy squad, but who have not quite hit the level required to win a full central contract."

After spending the 2016–17 season with the Otago Sparks in New Zealand, Langston was named as part of the England squad for the 2017 Women's Cricket World Cup. England went on to win the tournament, though Langston did not play. In 2018, after playing two seasons in the Women's Cricket Super League with the Loughborough Lightning, Langston was moved to the Yorkshire Diamonds, in a switch described by the head of the league as helping "to ensure the best balance between the six sides and to maintain a fair and competitive competition". In 2019, Langston's England central contract was not renewed. In 2020 Langston was chosen as part of the Northern Diamonds squad in the Rachael Heyhoe Flint Trophy. In 2021, she was Northern Diamonds' leading wicket-taker in the Rachael Heyhoe Flint Trophy, with 13 wickets, as well as playing for Northern Superchargers in The Hundred.

In December 2021, Langston was named in England's A squad for their tour to Australia, with the matches being played alongside the Women's Ashes. In April 2022, she was bought by the Northern Superchargers for the 2022 season of The Hundred.
