= Merissa Aguilleira =

Trinidadian cricketer

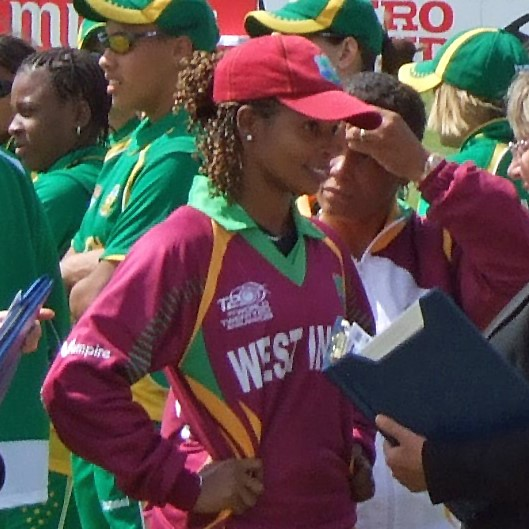
- Merissa Aguilleira in 2009

Personal information
- Full name: Merissa Ria Aguilleira
- Born: 14 December 1985 (age 40); Trinidad
- Batting: Right-handed
- Role: Wicket-keeper

International information
- National side: West Indies (2008–2019)
- ODI debut (cap 63): 8 July 2008 v Netherlands
- Last ODI: 22 September 2018 v South Africa
- ODI shirt no.: 7
- T20I debut (cap 16): 11 June 2009 v South Africa
- Last T20I: 3 February 2019 v Pakistan
- T20I shirt no.: 7

Domestic team information
- Years: Team
- 2005–2018/19: Trinidad and Tobago

Career statistics
| Competition | WODI | WT20I |
|---|---|---|
| Matches | 112 | 95 |
| Runs scored | 1,752 | 768 |
| Batting average | 20.61 | 14.49 |
| 100s/50s | 0/6 | 0/0 |
| Top score | 71 | 39* |
| Catches/stumpings | 78/27 | 28/34 |
- Source: ESPNcricinfo, 21 May 2021

Merissa Ria Aguilleira (born 14 December 1985) is a Trinidadian former cricketer who played as a right-handed wicket-keeper batter. She played for the West Indies between 2008 and 2019, appearing in 112 One Day Internationals and 95 Twenty20 Internationals before announcing her retirement from international cricket in April 2019. She played domestic cricket for Trinidad and Tobago.

== Career ==
In 2007, she was named captain of Trinidad and Tobago. Another role Merissa has is as the Sports Ambassador for Atlantic LNG.

Aguillera captained the West Indies in the 2009 Women's Cricket World Cup. A wicket-keeper and top order batsman, she has played 15 One Day Internationals since making her début against the Netherlands in 2008.

In 2011, in Bangladesh, Aguilleira was part of the West Indies team that won (ICC Women’s World Cup Qualifier) a four-nation tournament. She and her team also played in the 50-over World Cup Final in 2013. They played against Australia and were defeated. Earlier in Merissa’s life, she went to Moruga Composite School where she played windball cricket.

In 2015 Aguilleira was removed as captain when Pakistan women's cricket team toured West Indies, three days before they were announced as a new team. Jamaican’s Stafanie Taylor replaced her.

Aguilleira was captain of the West Indies from 2007 to 2015. While she was captain she took the team to the finals of the 2013 Women's Cricket World Cup and took the team to the semi-finals the last three Twenty20 World Cups.

Aguilleira along with reserve players are a part of a squad that is currently in a training camp at the West Indies High Performance Centre in Barbados. On 17 February 2013 West Indies were defeated by Australia by 114 runs in the finals. This was the ICC Women’s world cup at Barbourne Stadium. Also in 2013 Merissa Aguilleira was a nominee for Sportswoman of the Year at First Citizens Sports Foundation Awards ceremony, this was held at Queen's Hall.

In 2016 Merissa Aguilleira and the rest of the West Indies defeated New Zealand. This was in the semi-finals in the Women's ICC World Twenty20 in Mumbai, India.

She holds the record for playing the most number of WT20I matches as captain who also has kept wicket (62 matches).

In October 2018, Cricket West Indies (CWI) awarded her a women's contract for the 2018–19 season. Later the same month, she was named in the West Indies' squad for the 2018 ICC Women's World Twenty20 tournament in the West Indies.

== Outside of cricket ==
In 2002, alongside the Trinidad and Tobago Under-23's, Merissa played hardball cricket. Aguilleira is a part of the annual book drive in her community of Moruga. Doing this she partnered with Atlantic to help support the students in her community.
