= Suzie Bates =

New Zealand cricketer (born 1987)

Suzie Bates ONZM
- Bates in 2026

Personal information
- Full name: Suzannah Wilson Bates
- Born: 16 September 1987 (age 39); Dunedin, New Zealand
- Batting: Right-handed
- Bowling: Right-arm medium, right-arm off spin
- Role: All-rounder

International information
- National side: New Zealand (2006–2026)
- ODI debut (cap 100): 4 March 2006 v India
- Last ODI: 16 May 2026 v England
- T20I debut (cap 19): 10 August 2007 v South Africa
- Last T20I: 27 June 2026 v England
- T20I shirt no.: 23

Domestic team information
- Years: Team
- 2002/03–present: Otago
- 2012/13–2014/15: Western Australia
- 2015/16–2016/17: Perth Scorchers
- 2016: Kent
- 2016–2019: Southern Vipers
- 2017–2019: Hampshire
- 2017/18–2020/21: Adelaide Strikers
- 2018–2019: Trailblazers
- 2019/20: South Australia
- 2022–2023: Oval Invincibles
- 2022/23–2023/24: Sydney Sixers
- 2023: Guyana Amazon Warriors
- 2024: Birmingham Phoenix
- 2024/25: Hobart Hurricanes
- 2025: Durham

Career statistics
Competition	WODI	WT20I
Matches	184	178
Runs scored	5982	4,758
Batting average	37.86	28.83
100s/50s	13/37	1/28
Top score	168	124*
Balls bowled	3,419	1,342
Wickets	83	62
Bowling average	34.26	24.03
5 wickets in innings	0	0
10 wickets in match	0	0
Best bowling	4/7	4/26
Catches/stumpings	94/–	98/–
Medal record
Women's cricket
Representing New Zealand
ICC T20 World Cup
Winner	2024 UAE
Runner-up	2009 England
Runner-up	2010 West Indies
Commonwealth Games
Bronze medal – third place	2022 Birmingham
- Source: CricketArchive, 29 October 2025

Suzannah Wilson Bates ONZM (born 16 September 1987) is a New Zealand cricketer and former professional basketball player. Born in Dunedin, she plays domestic cricket for the Otago Sparks, as well as for the White Ferns, and formerly captained the New Zealand women's national cricket team. She currently holds the highest score and highest batting average in the New Zealand Women's Twenty20 cricket team. She won the ICC Women's ODI Cricketer of the Year in 2013. Bates again won ICC Women's ODI and T20I Cricketer of the Year 2016. She retired on 27 June 2026, from all international formats. Bates also represented New Zealand internationally in basketball.

== Basketball ==
Bates represented New Zealand in Women's basketball during the 2008 Summer Olympics. She played professional basketball for the Christchurch Sirens in the Australian Women's National Basketball League (WNBL), starting 24 games between 2007 and 2008, before moving to the Otago Gold Rush in 2009 and the Logan Thunder in 2009/10.

Bates joined the Otago Nuggets as an assistant coach for the 2021 New Zealand NBL season.

== Cricket ==
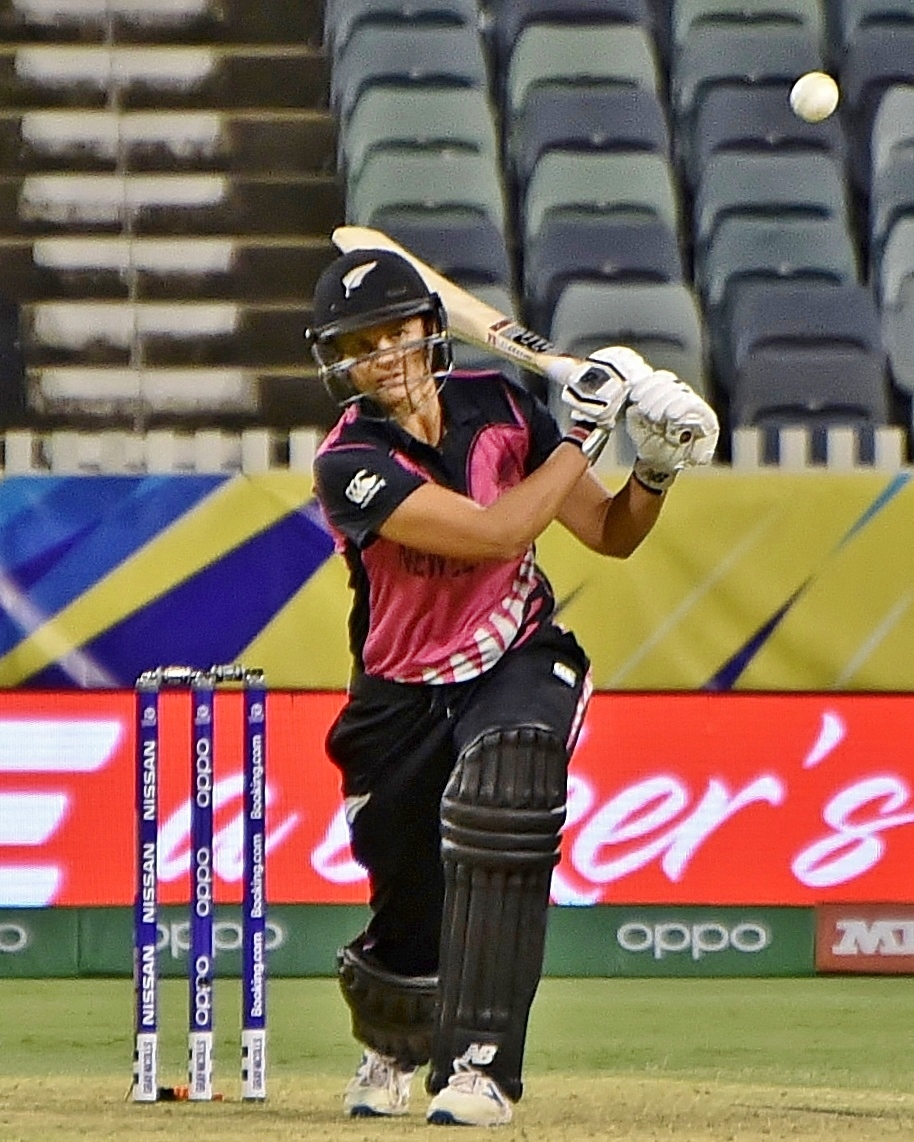
Bates batting for New Zealand during the 2020 ICC Women's T20 World Cup

On 8 June 2018, she scored her tenth century in WODIs, with 151 runs against Ireland. In the same match, she also became the leading run-scorer for New Zealand Women in WODIs, passing Debbie Hockley's total of 4,064 runs. On 20 June 2018, during the match against South Africa Women in the 2018 England women's Tri-Nation Series, Bates scored her first century in WT20I cricket. In the same match, she also became the leading run-scorer in the format, passing Charlotte Edwards' total of 2,605 runs. In the sixth match of the tri-series, Bates became the second woman, after Jenny Gunn, to play in 100 WT20I matches.

In August 2018, she was awarded a central contract by New Zealand Cricket, following the tours of Ireland and England in the previous months. In September 2018, she stepped down as captain of New Zealand and was replaced by Amy Satterthwaite.

In October 2018, she was named in New Zealand's squad for the 2018 ICC Women's World Twenty20 tournament in the West Indies. Ahead of the tournament, she was named as one of the players to watch. During the tournament, she became the first cricketer, male or female, to score 3,000 runs in Twenty20 International matches. She was the leading run-scorer for New Zealand in the tournament, with 161 runs in four matches. Following the conclusion of the tournament, she was named the standout player in the team by the International Cricket Council (ICC).

In November 2018, she was named in the Adelaide Strikers' squad for the 2018–19 Women's Big Bash League season. In January 2020, she was named in New Zealand's squad for the 2020 ICC Women's T20 World Cup in Australia. In September 2020, in the first match against Australia, Bates took her 50th wicket in WT20I cricket.

In November 2020, Bates was nominated for the Rachael Heyhoe-Flint Award for ICC Female Cricketer of the Decade, and the award for women's ODI cricketer of the decade. In February 2022, she was named in New Zealand's team for the 2022 Women's Cricket World Cup in New Zealand.

In April 2022, Bates was named the Super Smash Player of the Year at the annual Otago Cricket Awards. In June 2022, Bates was named in New Zealand's team for the cricket tournament at the 2022 Commonwealth Games in Birmingham, England.

In September 2024 she was named in the New Zealand squad for the 2024 ICC Women's T20 World Cup.

Bates was named in the New Zealand squad for their ODI tour to India in October 2024.

On 23 April 2026, Bates announced she would retire from international cricket following the conclusion of the 2026 ICC Women's T20 World Cup in England. She played her final international match for New Zealand on 27 June 2026 against England, where she and teammates Sophie Devine and Lea Tahuhu received a guard of honour from both teams, marking the end of her 20-year international career.

== International centuries ==
As of the conclusion of the 2022 Women's Cricket World Cup, Bates held the record for the most Women's ODI centuries by a New Zealander with 12 in total, and was second only to Meg Lanning of Australia overall. She had also scored a single Women's Twenty20 International century. Her highest ODI and international score was her second ODI century, a score of 168 against Pakistan, at Sydney on 19 March 2009, made during the 2009 Women's Cricket World Cup.

In October 2013, Bates became the sole holder of the record for the most Women's ODI centuries by a New Zealander, which she had previously shared with Debbie Hockley, when she recorded her fifth century, a score of 110 against the West Indies at Sabina Park, Jamaica.

One Day International centuries
No.	Runs	Opponents	City/Country	Venue	Year
1	122	India	Chennai, India	MA Chidambaram Stadium	2007
2	168	Pakistan	Sydney, Australia	Drummoyne Oval	2009
3	122*	Australia	Sydney, Australia	Sydney Cricket Ground	2012
4	102	Australia	Cuttack, India	DRIEMS Ground	2013
5	110	West Indies	Kingston, Jamaica	Sabina Park	2013
6	106	England	Mount Maunganui, New Zealand	Bay Oval	2015
7	110	Australia	Mount Maunganui, New Zealand	Bay Oval	2016
8	106*	Sri Lanka	Bristol, England	County Ground	2017
9	101*	West Indies	Lincoln, New Zealand	Bert Sutcliffe Oval	2018
10	151	Ireland	Dublin, Ireland	YMCA Cricket Club	2018
11	106	India	Queenstown, New Zealand	John Davies Oval	2022
12	126	Pakistan	Christchurch, New Zealand	Hagley Oval	2022

Twenty20 International centuries
No.	Runs	Opponents	City/Country	Venue	Year
1	124*	South Africa	Taunton, England	County Ground	2018

== Honours and awards ==
- ICC Women's ODI Cricketer of the Year – 2013
- Wisden Leading Woman Cricketer in the World – 2015
- ICC Women's ODI Cricketer of the Year – 2016
- ICC Women's T20I Cricketer of the Year – 2016

In the 2026 King's Birthday Honours, Bates was appointed an Officer of the New Zealand Order of Merit, for services to cricket and basketball.
