= Morna Nielsen =

New Zealand cricketer (born 1990)

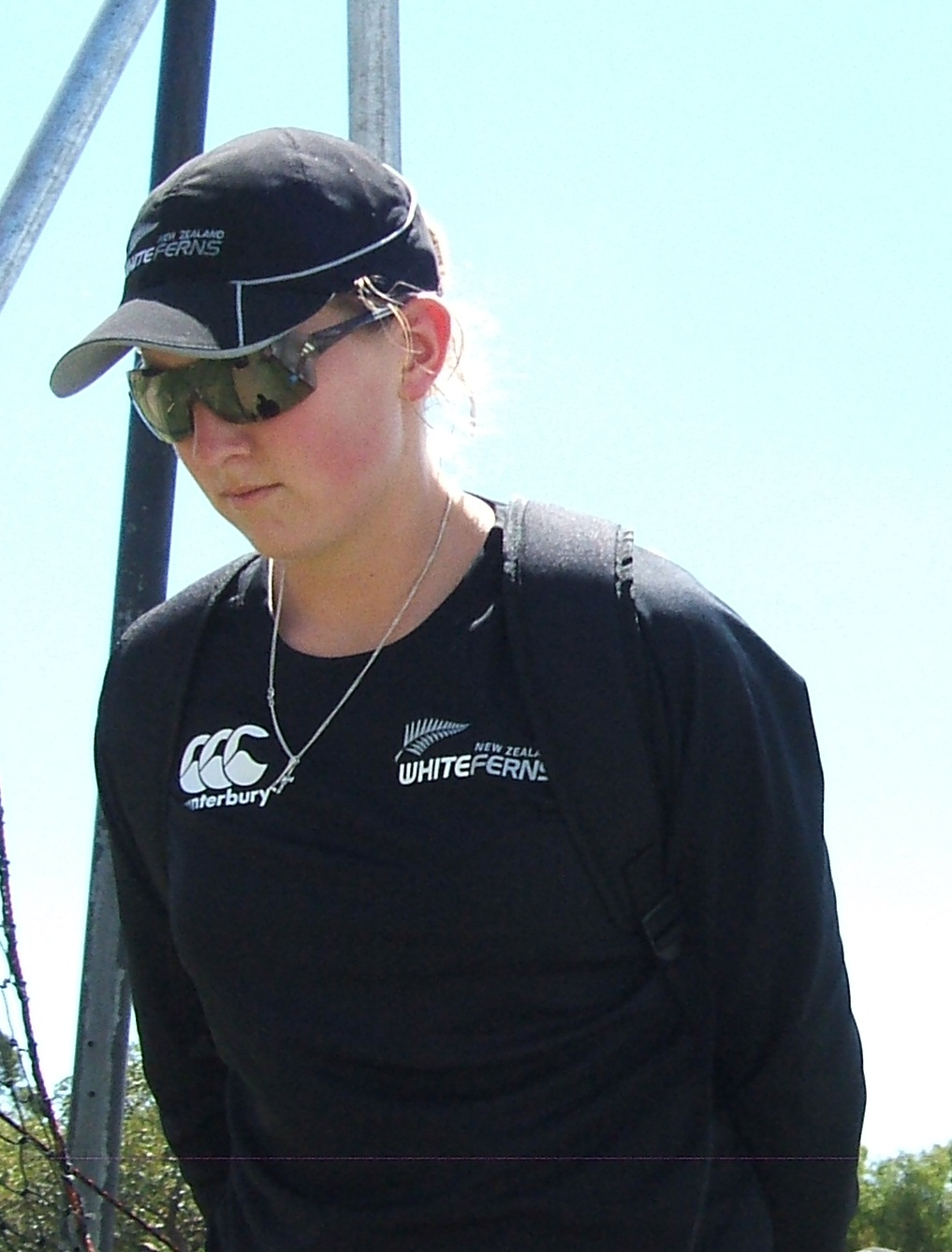

Personal information
- Full name: Morna Jessie Godwin Nielsen
- Born: 24 February 1990 (age 36); Tauranga, Bay of Plenty, New Zealand
- Batting: Right-handed
- Bowling: Slow left-arm orthodox
- Role: Bowler

International information
- National side: New Zealand (2010–2016)
- ODI debut (cap 115): 11 February 2010 v Australia
- Last ODI: 19 November 2016 v Pakistan
- T20I debut (cap 36): 20 January 2012 v Australia
- Last T20I: 21 November 2016 v Pakistan

Domestic team information
- Years: Team
- 2007/08–2013/14: Northern Districts
- 2008: Durham
- 2014/15–2017/18: Otago
- 2015/16–2016/17: Melbourne Stars
- 2016: Southern Vipers

Career statistics
Competition	WODI	WT20I	WLA	WT20
Matches	52	44	141	131
Runs scored	121	60	998	465
Batting average	6.05	12.00	12.79	10.10
100s/50s	0/0	0/0	0/2	0/0
Top score	20	21*	79*	28
Balls bowled	2,352	941	5,886	2,472
Wickets	53	41	124	103
Bowling average	26.75	18.36	30.08	20.64
5 wickets in innings	2	0	2	0
10 wickets in match	0	0	0	0
Best bowling	5/21	4/10	5/21	4/10
Catches/stumpings	7/–	6/–	33/–	14/–
- Source: CricketArchive, 16 April 2021

Morna Jessie Godwin Nielsen (born 24 February 1990) is a New Zealand former cricketer who played as a slow left-arm orthodox bowler. She appeared in 52 One Day Internationals and 44 Twenty20 Internationals for New Zealand between 2010 and 2016. On 10 November 2015, she got her first five-wicket haul at the Bert Sutcliffe Oval. She played domestic cricket for Northern Districts and Otago, as well as having stints with Durham, Melbourne Stars and Southern Vipers. In August 2018, she announced her retirement from all forms of cricket.
