= Sian Ruck =

New Zealand women cricketer (born 1983)

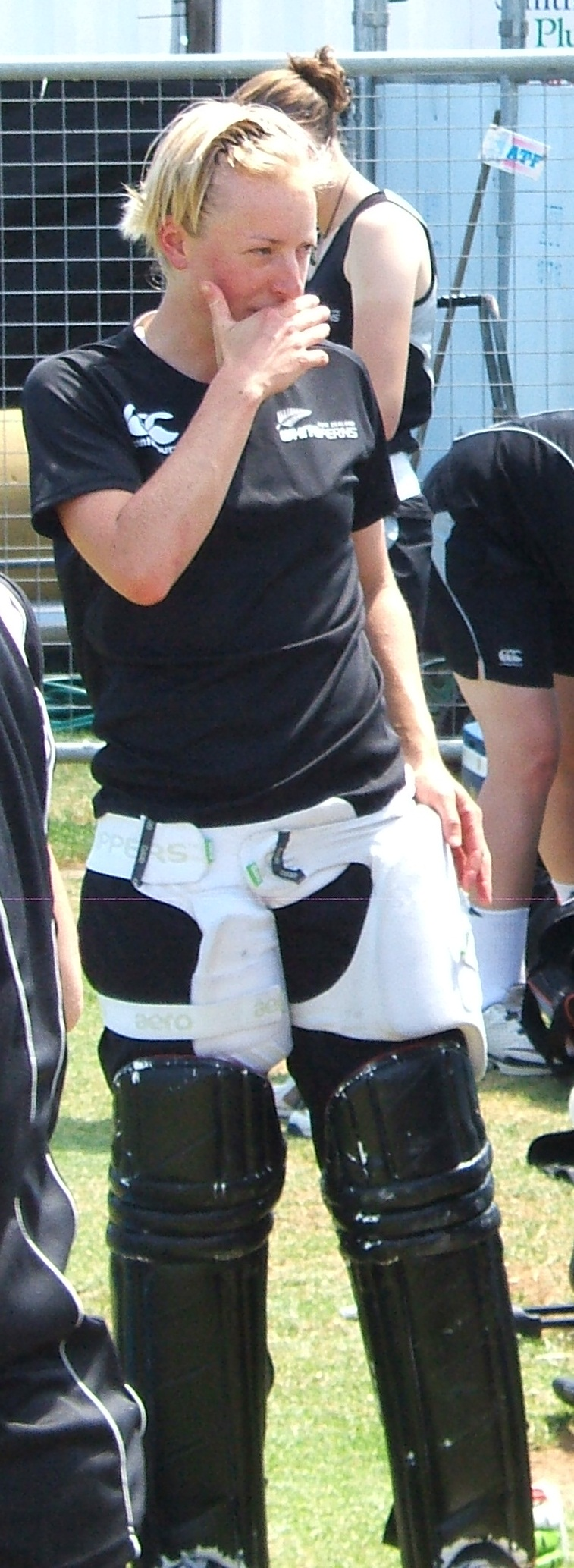

Personal information
- Full name: Sian Elizabeth Ansley Ruck
- Born: 8 December 1983 (age 42); Auckland, New Zealand
- Batting: Right-handed
- Bowling: Left-arm medium
- Role: Bowler

International information
- National side: New Zealand (2009–2013)
- ODI debut (cap 114): 10 February 2010 v Australia
- Last ODI: 10 October 2013 v West Indies
- T20I debut (cap 28): 1 June 2009 v Australia
- Last T20I: 22 October 2013 v England

Domestic team information
- Years: Team
- 2006/07–2013/14: Wellington
- 2010–2011: Essex
- 2011/12–2013/13: Australian Capital Territory
- 2014: Hertfordshire
- 2014/15: Northern Districts
- 2015: Worcestershire

Career statistics
| Competition | WODI | WT20I | WLA | WT20 |
|---|---|---|---|---|
| Matches | 27 | 37 | 141 | 122 |
| Runs scored | 48 | 16 | 635 | 241 |
| Batting average | 12.00 | 4.00 | 11.98 | 12.05 |
| 100s/50s | 0/0 | 0/0 | 0/0 | 0/1 |
| Top score | 12* | 6 | 42 | 52* |
| Balls bowled | 1,279 | 750 | 6,805 | 2,536 |
| Wickets | 24 | 40 | 150 | 102 |
| Bowling average | 32.75 | 17.20 | 26.78 | 21.78 |
| 5 wickets in innings | 0 | 0 | 1 | 0 |
| 10 wickets in match | 0 | 0 | 0 | 0 |
| Best bowling | 4/31 | 3/12 | 5/22 | 3/9 |
| Catches/stumpings | 4/– | 5/– | 16/– | 18/– |
- Source: CricketArchive, 9 April 2021

Sian Elizabeth Ansley Ruck is a New Zealand former cricketer who played as a left-arm medium bowler. She appeared in 27 One Day Internationals and 37 Twenty20 Internationals for New Zealand between 2009 and 2013. She played domestic cricket for Wellington and Northern Districts, as well as stints with Australian Capital Territory, Essex, Hertfordshire and Worcestershire.
