= Shaquana Quintyne =

West Indian cricketer (born 1996)

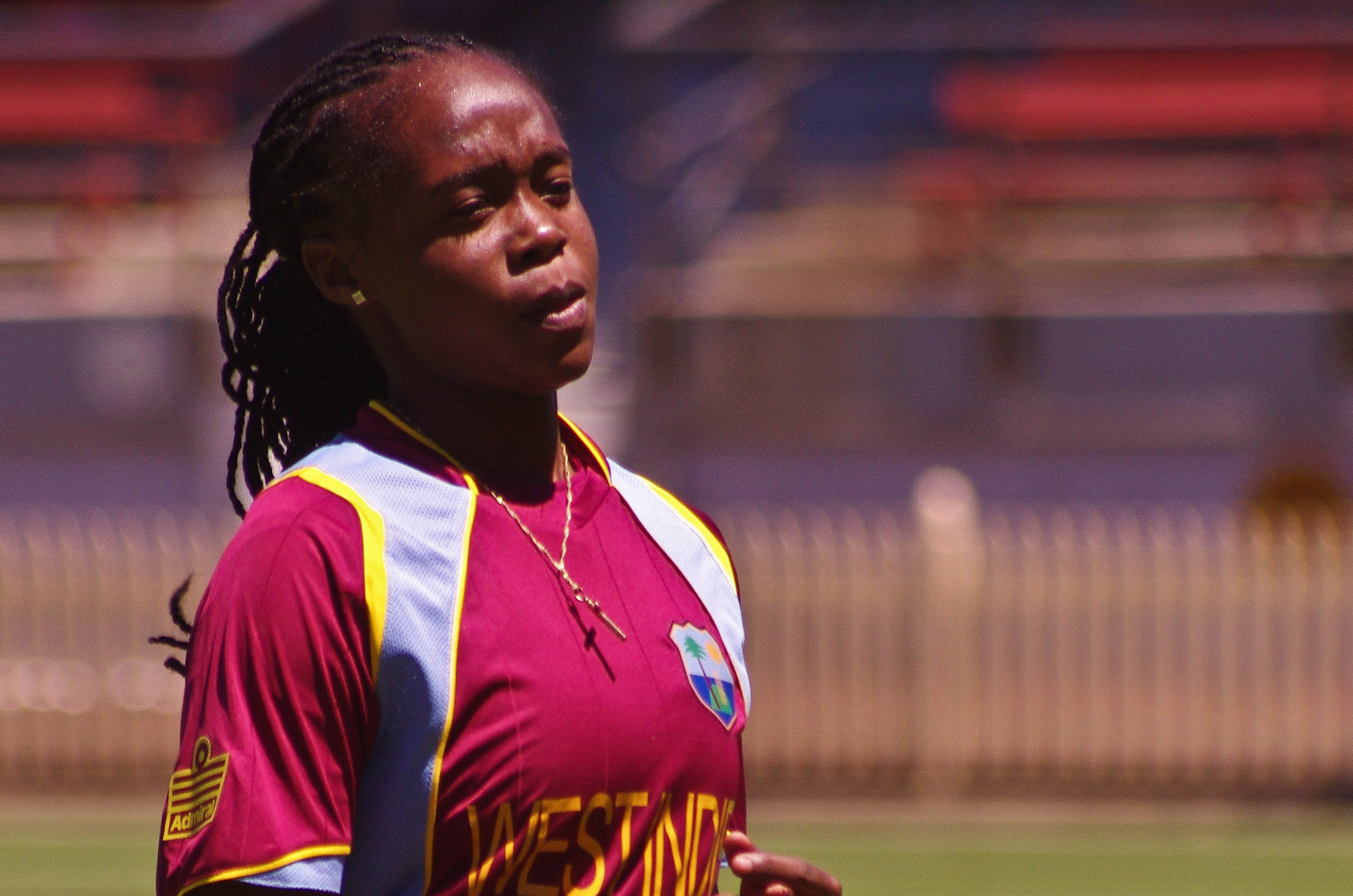
- Quintyne in 2014

Personal information
- Full name: Shaquana Latish Quintyne
- Born: 3 January 1996 (age 30); Barbados
- Batting: Right-handed
- Bowling: Right-arm leg break
- Role: Bowler

International information
- National side: West Indies (2011–2016)
- ODI debut (cap 75): 1 September 2011 v Pakistan
- Last ODI: 16 November 2016 v India
- T20I debut (cap 27): 11 September 2011 v Pakistan
- Last T20I: 22 November 2016 v India

Domestic team information
- Years: Team
- 2009–2016: Barbados

Career statistics
Competition	WODI	WT20I	WLA	WT20
Matches	40	45	68	62
Runs scored	482	181	811	448
Batting average	17.85	10.05	16.89	17.92
100s/50s	0/0	0/0	0/1	0/2
Top score	42	29	60	56*
Balls bowled	1,330	813	2,403	1,125
Wickets	35	39	74	59
Bowling average	24.48	19.97	17.21	16.18
5 wickets in innings	0	1	0	1
10 wickets in match	0	0	0	0
Best bowling	4/14	5/16	4/10	5/16
Catches/stumpings	9/–	13/–	16/–	17/–
- Source: Cricinfo, 22 May 2021

Shaquana Latish Quintyne (born 3 January 1996) is a Barbadian former cricketer who played as a right-arm leg break bowler. She appeared in 40 One Day Internationals and 45 Twenty20 Internationals for the West Indies between 2011 and 2016. She played domestic cricket for Barbados.

In March 2017, Quintyne suffered an injury to her right knee during a training session for the West Indies. Subsequent surgeries were unable to fix the problem, effectively ending her career.

== Career ==
Quintyne played domestically for Barbados, holding the record batting score for both List A and Twenty20 cricket within Barbados. In 2011, aged 17, she made her debut for the West Indies against Pakistan. She played 40 One Day Internationals and 45 Twenty20 matches for the West Indies.

In March 2017, whilst training for the upcoming Women's Cricket World Cup in England, Quintyne injured her knee whilst diving for a ball. The physios applied ice and cataflam but this had no effect. The West Indies Cricket Board (now Cricket West Indies) suggested she go for surgery in Jamaica with a doctor they recommended. The surgery was not a success and an independent doctor in Barbados had to remove screws as they had not been set correctly. Another surgery was conducted in Canada where the doctors stated that due to the lack of cartilage in her knee, she would never play cricket again.

After this, Cricket West Indies stopped providing assistance for her treatment and terminated her central contract. This was due to Cricket West Indies' Total and Permanent Disablement policy not applying to the women's team in 2017. The West Indies Players Association also failed to represent her. The Barbados Cricket Association also failed to intervene, claiming it was a West Indies matter. In 2020, she brought a lawsuit against Cricket West Indies.

After cricket, she trained at the National Academy of Sports Medicine in the United States and qualified as a personal trainer.
