= Stafanie Taylor =

West Indian cricketer

Stafanie Taylor OD
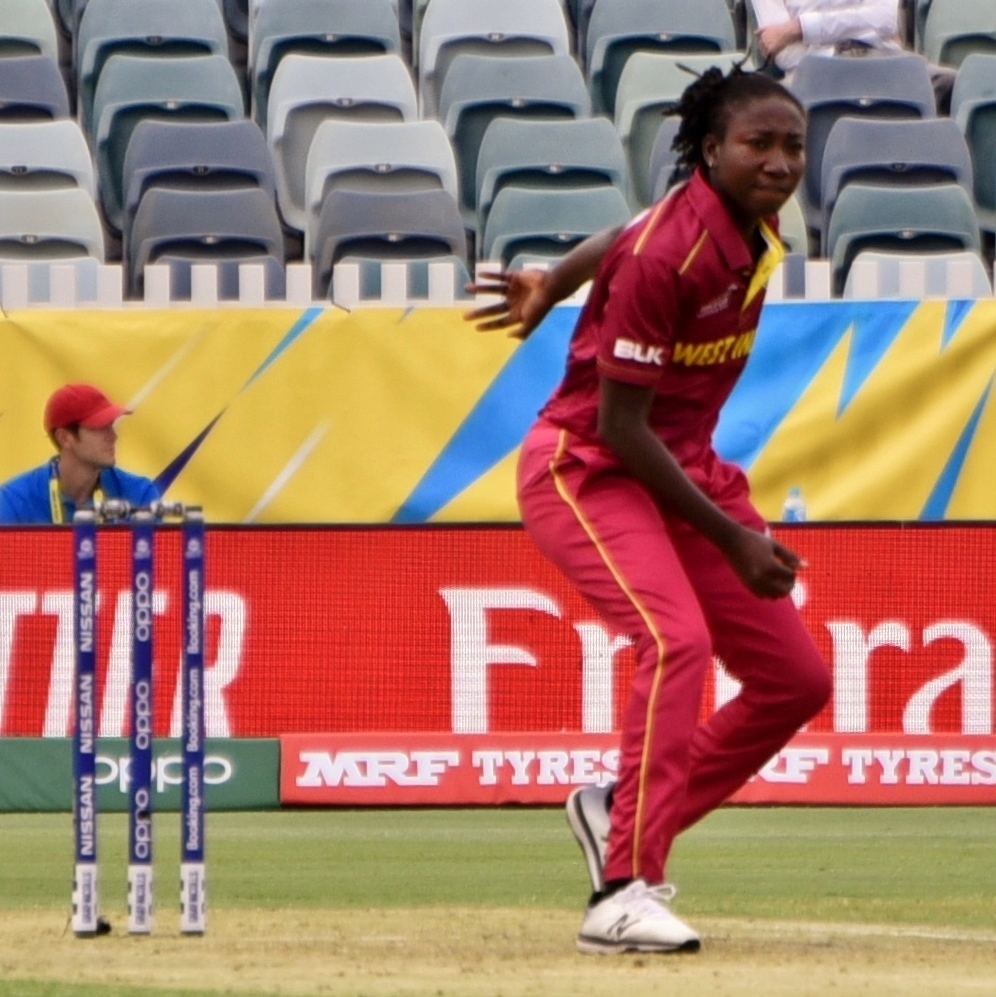
- Taylor in 2020

Personal information
- Full name: Stafanie Roxann Taylor
- Born: 11 June 1991 (age 35); Spanish Town, Jamaica
- Batting: Right-handed
- Bowling: Right-arm off break
- Role: All-rounder

International information
- National side: West Indies (2008–present)
- ODI debut (cap 60): 24 June 2008 v Ireland
- Last ODI: 21 June 2024 v Sri Lanka
- T20I debut (cap 11): 27 June 2008 v Ireland
- Last T20I: 18 October 2024 v New Zealand
- T20I shirt no.: 7

Domestic team information
- Years: Team
- 2002–present: Jamaica
- 2011/12: Auckland
- 2015/16–2018/19: Sydney Thunder
- 2016–2018: Western Storm
- 2019: Trailblazers
- 2019: Southern Vipers
- 2019/20–2020/21: Adelaide Strikers
- 2021: Southern Brave
- 2022–present: Guyana Amazon Warriors

Career statistics
Competition	WODI	WT20I
Matches	160	125
Runs scored	5,691	3,426
Batting average	43.811	35.21
100s/50s	7/41	0/22
Top score	171	90
Balls bowled	5,791	1,737
Wickets	155	98
Bowling average	22.22	16.72
5 wickets in innings	0	0
10 wickets in match	0	0
Best bowling	4/17	4/12
Catches/stumpings	68/–	36/–
- Source: ESPNcricinfo, 19 October 2024

Stafanie Roxann Taylor OD (born 11 June 1991) is a Jamaican cricketer who is a former captain of the West Indies women's cricket team. She has represented them over 280 times since her debut in 2008. A right-handed batter and off break bowler, Taylor was selected as the 2011 ICC Women's Cricketer of the Year – the first West Indian to receive the accolade. She was also the first woman to score 1,000 runs in ODIs for the West Indies. She plays domestic cricket for Jamaica and Guyana Amazon Warriors and has previously played for Auckland, Sydney Thunder, Adelaide Strikers, Western Storm, Southern Vipers, Southern Brave and Trailblazers.

Born in Jamaica, Taylor broke into the West Indies team in 2008, aged 17, and immediately inserted herself as a key member of the team. She scored her highest Twenty20 total on debut, striking 90 runs from 49 balls to help her side to a large victory. In the 2016 World Twenty20, she was the highest run-scorer and named player of the tournament.

She played in her 100th Women's One Day International (WODI) match, when the West Indies played India in the group stage of the 2017 Women's Cricket World Cup, on 29 June 2017. On 18 September 2019, during the series against Australia, Taylor played in her 100th Women's Twenty20 International (WT20I) match. On 24 September 2020, in the second match against England, Taylor became the second cricketer to score 3,000 runs in WT20I cricket.

== Early life and education ==
Taylor was born in Spanish Town, Jamaica. Her unusual first name (Stafanie instead of Stefanie) is attributable to "a slight mishap" when her birth was registered. She was raised in Gordon Pen, an inner city neighbourhood of Spanish Town, in what have been described as "modest circumstances".

At primary school, Taylor first played football, and then netball. When she was about eight years old, she saw Leon Campbell, later her personal coach, practising a cricket shot, and asked him what he was doing. He told her, and asked her to try the game of cricket, which she did, including by playing informal street games with young boys. She later went on her first cricket tour, at just ten years old.

For some time, Taylor played both football and cricket, but eventually she decided that the latter would give her more opportunities to travel the world.

Although her mother and some of her siblings were track and field athletes at secondary school, Taylor is the only member of her family to play cricket seriously. During her own secondary school days, at Eltham High School, Spanish Town, she represented the school at both Under-14 and Under-16 levels, in each case as the only girl in the team. In one of her matches for the Under-16 team, she even scored a century.

After leaving Eltham High School, Taylor worked on completing her Caribbean Secondary Education Certificate (CSEC) exams at a private institution.

== Career ==
Taylor first appeared for the West Indies during their 2008 tour of Europe, during which she granted her side their maiden Twenty20 victory on her debut. Batting first against Ireland, Taylor opened the innings for the West Indies, and scored 90 runs from 49 balls. Her total is the second highest score by a West Indian in a Twenty20 International. She subsequently scored her first half-century in One Day International cricket in her next match. In a much more patient innings than she demonstrated in the Twenty20, she scored 66 runs from 97 balls to help her side overcome Ireland. She scored another half-century in her next appearance, scoring 70 runs against the Netherlands. During the 2009 Women's Cricket World Cup, she was the West Indies best performer, leading the team in both runs scored and wickets taken. She repeated the feat at the 2009 ICC Women's World Twenty20, in which she scored half-centuries in her side's opening two matches to become the only woman to score fifties in three consecutive Twenty20 Internationals, a feat she repeated in 2010 in a three match series against Sri Lanka.

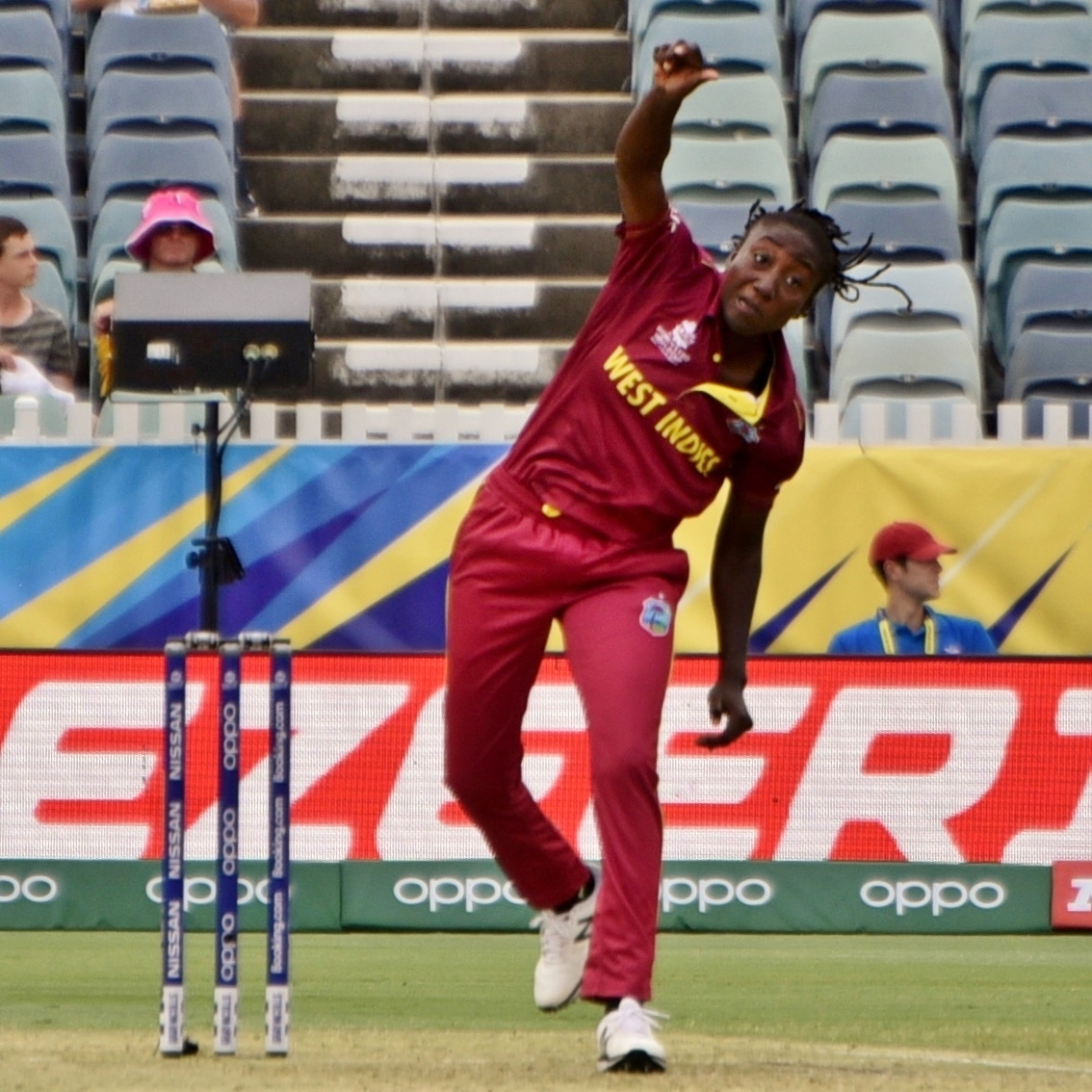
Taylor bowling for the West Indies during the 2020 ICC Women's T20 World Cup

She scored her maiden century in One Day Internationals in October 2009, remaining 108 not out against South Africa. She was the standout performer in the following season's 2010 ICC Women's Cricket Challenge, scoring 390 runs in five matches at an average of 97.50. The West Indies lost to only South Africa in the competition, and finished as runners-up. She scored her second century, and highest score to date, during the tournament, making 147 against the Netherlands. Her performances between August 2010 and August 2011 resulted in her being named the 2011 ICC Women's Cricketer of the Year.

In July 2017, she was named Women's Cricketer of the Year by the West Indies Players' Association. In December 2017, she was named as one of the players in the ICC Women's T20I Team of the Year.

In June 2018, she was named the Women's Cricketer of the Year and the Women's ODI Cricketer of the Year at the annual Cricket West Indies' Awards. In October 2018, Cricket West Indies (CWI) awarded her a women's contract for the 2018–19 season. Later the same month, she was named as captain of the West Indies' squad for the 2018 ICC Women's World Twenty20 tournament in the West Indies. Ahead of the tournament, she was named as the star of the team and one of the players to watch.

In November 2018, she was named in Sydney Thunder's squad for the 2018–19 Women's Big Bash League season. In January 2020, she was named as the captain of West Indies' squad for the 2020 ICC Women's T20 World Cup in Australia. She was the leading run-scorer for the West Indies in the tournament, with 84 runs in three matches.

In November 2020, Taylor was nominated for the Rachael Heyhoe-Flint Award for ICC Female Cricketer of the Decade, and the award for women's ODI cricketer of the decade. In May 2021, Taylor was awarded with a central contract from Cricket West Indies. In 2021, she was drafted by Southern Brave for the inaugural season of The Hundred.

In June 2021, she was named in the West Indies women's squad as the captain for their home series against Pakistan women. In the third match of the series, Taylor became the second bowler for the West Indies to take a hat-trick in WT20Is. On 7 July 2021, in the opening WODI against Pakistan, Taylor scored her first century in almost eight years, leading the West Indies to a five wicket win. In October 2021, she was named as the captain of the West Indies team for the 2021 Women's Cricket World Cup Qualifier tournament in Zimbabwe. In February 2022, she was named as the captain of the West Indies team for the 2022 Women's Cricket World Cup in New Zealand.

She was named in the West Indies squad for the 2024 ICC Women's T20 World Cup.

Taylor was part of the West Indies squad for the 2025 Women's Cricket World Cup Qualifier in Pakistan in April 2025.

== Other records ==
She was the first female cricketer to score a century and to take four wickets in an innings of a WODI.

She is the only player to have taken more than 5,000 runs and more than 150 wickets in WODI cricket.[62]

== International centuries ==
One Day International centuries
Runs	Match	Opponents	City, country	Venue	Year
108*	18	South Africa	Paarl, South Africa	Boland Park	2009
147	27	Netherlands	Potchefstroom, South Africa	Witrand Cricket Field	2010
107	41	Ireland	Savar, Bangladesh	Bangladesh Krira Shikkha Protishtan (3)	2011
171	56	Sri Lanka	Mumbai, India	Middle Income Group Club Ground	2013
135*	67	New Zealand	Kingston, Jamaica	Sabina Park	2013
105*	127	Pakistan	Saint George Parish, Antigua and Barbuda	Coolidge Cricket Ground	2021
102*	133	Pakistan	Karachi, Pakistan	National Stadium	2021
105*	174	Australia	Basseterre, Saint Kitts and Nevis	Warner Park Sporting Complex	2026
100*	178	Ireland	Magheramason, Northern Ireland	Bready Cricket Club Ground	2026
105	179	Ireland	Magheramason, Northern Ireland	Bready Cricket Club Ground	2026

- Source: CricInfo

== Awards and honours ==
=== Awards ===
- ICC Women's Cricketer of the Year – 2011
- ICC Women's ODI Cricketer of the Year – 2012
- ICC Women's T20I Cricketer of the Year – 2015

=== Honours ===
At a reception held on 6 April 2016 to celebrate Taylor's return to Jamaica after captaining the West Indies to victory in the 2016 ICC Women's World Twenty20, the Minister of Sports, Olivia Grange, announced that the cricket ground at Eltham High School would be renamed the Stafanie Taylor Oval. On 1 November 2017, Grange presided over a ground-breaking ceremony at the school for the construction of the oval, and the unveiling of a sign in Taylor's honour.

Meanwhile, on 16 October 2017, National Heroes' Day in Jamaica, Taylor was presented with the Order of Distinction at the Jamaican National Awards Ceremony.

Preceded by Shelley Nitschke	ICC Women's Cricketer of the Year; 2011	Succeeded by Award discontinued Ellyse Perry (in 2017)
