= New Zealand women's cricket team in Australia in 2008–09 =

	Australia	New Zealand
- Date: 15 February 2009
Captains	Karen Rolton	Haidee Tiffen

Twenty20 International series
- Results: Australia won the 1-match series 1–0
Most runs	Shelley Nitschke (54)	Kate Pulford (29)
Most wickets	Shelley Nitschke (2); Lisa Sthalekar (2)	Sophie Devine (1)

The New Zealand women's national cricket team toured Australia in February 2009. They played against Australia in one Twenty20 International, which was a double-header with a men's T20I, also between Australia and New Zealand, at the Sydney Cricket Ground. Australia won the match, which was reduced by rain, by 9 wickets. The tour preceded both sides' participation in the 2009 World Cup, which was also held in Australia.

== Squads ==
Australia	New Zealand
Karen Rolton (c); Sarah Andrews; Alex Blackwell; Leonie Coleman; Jess Duffin; Lauren Ebsary; Rene Farrell; Jodie Fields (wk); Delissa Kimmince; Shelley Nitschke; Erin Osborne; Ellyse Perry; Leah Poulton; Emma Sampson; Lisa Sthalekar	Haidee Tiffen (c); Suzie Bates; Nicola Browne; Abby Burrows; Sophie Devine; Lucy Doolan; Katey Martin; Sara McGlashan; Beth McNeill; Rachel Priest (wk); Kate Pulford; Amy Satterthwaite; Sarah Tsukigawa; Aimee Watkins

== Only WT20I ==
15 February 2009
Scorecard

New Zealand; 91/5 (14 overs)	v	Australia; 83/1 (10.1 overs)
Kate Pulford 29 (24); Shelley Nitschke 2/16 (3 overs)		Shelley Nitschke 54* (33); Sophie Devine 1/17 (3 overs)

Australia Women won by 9 wickets (D/L)
Sydney Cricket Ground, Sydney
Umpires: Michael Kumutat (Aus) and Peter Tate (Aus)
Player of the match: Shelley Nitschke (Aus)

- Australia Women won the toss and elected to field.
- Rain stopped play after 6.2 overs of New Zealand Women's innings; match reduced to 14 overs per side.
- Australia Women's target was 95 to win off 14 overs.
- Rain stopped play after 7.2 overs of Australia Women's innings; revised target was 82 runs off 12 overs.
- Jess Duffin, Lauren Ebsary, Erin Osborne (Aus) and Kate Pulford (NZ) all made their WODI debuts.
