= 2016–17 New Zealand Women's One-Day Competition =

- Dates: 26 November 2016 – 12 February 2017
- Administrator: New Zealand Cricket
- Cricket format: 50 over
- Tournament format(s): Round robin and final
- Champions: Canterbury Magicians (38th title)
- Participants: 6
- Matches: 31
- Most runs: Katey Martin (436)
- Most wickets: Kate Ebrahim (16); Amy Satterthwaite (16)

The 2016–17 New Zealand Women's One-Day Competition was a 50-over women's cricket competition that took place in New Zealand. It ran from November 2016 to February 2017, with 6 provincial teams taking part. Canterbury Magicians beat Auckland Hearts in the final to win the competition.

The tournament ran alongside the 2016–17 New Zealand Women's Twenty20 Competition.

== Competition format ==
Teams played in a double round-robin in a group of six, therefore playing 10 matches overall. Matches were played using a one day format with 50 overs per side. The top two in the group advanced to the final.

The group worked on a points system with positions being based on the total points. Points were awarded as follows:

Win: 4 points
Tie: 2 points
Loss: 0 points.
Abandoned/No Result: 2 points.
Bonus Point: 1 point awarded for run rate in a match being 1.25x that of opponent.

== Points table ==
Team	Pld	W	L	T	NR	A	BP	Pts	NRR
Canterbury Magicians	10	7	2	0	1	0	5	35	0.134
Auckland Hearts	10	6	2	0	1	1	5	33	1.166
Wellington Blaze	10	5	3	0	1	1	2	26	0.193
Otago Sparks	10	4	4	0	1	1	2	22	0.212
Northern Spirit	10	2	7	0	1	0	1	11	–1.297
Central Hinds	10	1	7	0	1	1	1	9	–0.411

Source: ESPN Cricinfo

Advanced to the Final

== Final ==
12 February 2017
Scorecard

Auckland Hearts; 233/6 (50 overs)	v	Canterbury Magicians; 236/4 (47.1 overs)
Katie Perkins 100* (111); Kate Ebrahim 2/32 (10 overs)		Kate Ebrahim 100* (133); Rosalind McNeill 1/32 (6 overs)

Canterbury Magicians won by 6 wickets
Hagley Oval, Christchurch
Umpires: Eugene Sanders and Kim Cotton

- Auckland Hearts won the toss and elected to bat.

== Statistics ==
=== Most runs ===
Player	Team	Matches	Innings	Runs	Average	HS	100s	50s
Katey Martin	Otago Sparks	9	9	436	54.50	114	1	3
Frances Mackay	Canterbury Magicians	11	9	351	70.20	95*	0	3
Natalie Dodd	Northern Spirit	10	9	349	38.77	93	0	3
Sara McGlashan	Auckland Hearts	7	7	342	85.50	119*	1	1
Anna Peterson	Auckland Hearts	10	9	325	40.62	79*	0	3

Source: ESPN Cricinfo

=== Most wickets ===
Player	Team	Overs	Wickets	Average	BBI	5w
Kate Ebrahim	Canterbury Magicians	76.2	16	16.43	4/14	0
Amy Satterthwaite	Canterbury Magicians	79.1	16	20.68	4/31	0
Jess Watkin	Central Hinds	65.0	15	18.20	4/34	0
Leigh Kasperek	Otago Sparks	67.0	14	17.85	3/34	0
Deanna Doughty	Wellington Blaze	84.2	14	28.28	3/25	0

Source: ESPN Cricinfo
