= 2009–10 New Zealand Cricket Women's One Day Competition =

- Dates: 5 December 2009 – 31 January 2010
- Administrator: New Zealand Cricket
- Cricket format: 50 over
- Tournament format(s): Round robin and final
- Champions: Central Hinds (2nd title)
- Participants: 6
- Matches: 31
- Most runs: Nicola Browne (474)
- Most wickets: Rosie Cox (19)

The 2009–10 New Zealand Cricket Women's One Day Competition was a 50-over women's cricket competition that took place in New Zealand. It ran from December 2009 to January 2010, with 6 provincial teams taking part. Central Hinds won the competition by virtue of topping the group stage after the final was abandoned due to rain.

The tournament ran alongside the 2009–10 New Zealand Cricket Women's Twenty20, which Central Hinds also won.

== Competition format ==
Teams played in a double round-robin in a group of six, therefore playing 10 matches overall. Matches were played using a one day format with 50 overs per side. The top two in the group advanced to the final.

The group worked on a points system with positions being based on the total points. Points were awarded as follows:

Win: 4 points
Tie: 2 points
Loss: 0 points.
Abandoned/No Result: 2 points.
Bonus Point: 1 point awarded for run rate in a match being 1.25x that of opponent.

== Points table ==
Team	Pld	W	L	T	NR	A	BP	Pts	NRR
Central Hinds	10	6	3	0	0	1	2	28	0.357
Wellington Blaze	10	5	4	0	0	1	4	26	0.482
Canterbury Magicians	10	5	5	0	0	0	1	21	–0.116
Auckland Hearts	10	5	5	0	0	0	0	20	–0.083
Northern Spirit	10	4	5	0	1	0	1	19	–0.149
Otago Sparks	10	3	6	0	1	0	0	14	–0.523

Source: CricketArchive

Advanced to the Final

== Final ==
31 January 2010
Scorecard

Central Hinds	v	Wellington Blaze

Match Abandoned
Nelson Park, Napier

- No toss.
- No play possible due to rain.
- Central Hinds won the 2009–10 New Zealand Cricket Women's One Day Competition on better record in qualifying.

== Statistics ==
=== Most runs ===
Player	Team	Matches	Innings	Runs	Average	HS	100s	50s
Nicola Browne	Northern Spirit	10	8	474	118.50	111*	1	4
Sarah Tsukigawa	Otago Sparks	10	10	404	50.50	83	0	4
Katie Pulford	Northern Spirit	9	9	397	56.71	130	1	2
Katey Martin	Otago Sparks	10	10	379	37.90	92	0	4
Amy Satterthwaite	Canterbury Magicians	10	10	376	41.77	92*	0	3

Source: ESPN Cricinfo

=== Most wickets ===
Player	Team	Overs	Wickets	Average	BBI	5w
Rosie Cox	Auckland Hearts	71.3	19	13.78	5/40	1
Natalee Scripps	Auckland Hearts	78.5	17	16.76	4/35	0
Paula Gruber	Auckland Hearts	83.0	16	16.62	4/17	0
Kate Ebrahim	Central Hinds	87.0	16	17.87	4/19	0
Katie Pulford	Northern Spirit	76.4	16	18.62	3/24	0

Source: ESPN Cricinfo
