= 2021–22 Hallyburton Johnstone Shield =

- Dates: 30 October 2021 – 27 February 2022
- Administrator: New Zealand Cricket
- Cricket format: 50 over
- Tournament format(s): Round robin and final
- Champions: Otago Sparks (3rd title)
- Participants: 6
- Matches: 31
- Most runs: Kate Ebrahim (451)
- Most wickets: Nensi Patel (18)

The 2021–22 Hallyburton Johnstone Shield was a 50-over women's cricket competition, the fifth season with the name Hallyburton Johnstone Shield, that took place in New Zealand. It ran from October 2021 to February 2022, with 6 provincial teams taking part. Canterbury Magicians were the defending champions. Wellington Blaze topped the group to qualify for the final, with Otago Sparks qualifying in second. Otago went on to win the competition, beating Wellington by 138 runs in the final. Otago's Kate Ebrahim was the leading run-scorer while Northern Districts' Nensi Patel took the most wickets in the tournament.

The tournament ran alongside the 2021–22 Super Smash.

== Competition format ==
Teams played in a double round-robin in a group of six, therefore playing 10 matches overall. Matches were played using a one day format with 50 overs per side. The top two in the group advanced to the final.

The group worked on a points system with positions being based on the total points. Points were awarded as follows:

Win: 4 points
Tie: 2 points
Loss: 0 points.
Abandoned/No Result: 2 points.
Bonus Point: 1 point awarded for run rate in a match being 1.25x that of opponent.

== Points table ==
Pos	Team	Pld	W	L	T	NR	BP	Pts	NRR
1	Wellington Blaze (Q)	10	5	0	0	5	2	32	0.940
2	Otago Sparks (Q)	10	3	2	0	5	3	25	1.276
3	Northern Districts	10	4	2	1	3	1	25	−0.025
4	Central Hinds	10	2	2	0	6	2	22	−0.610
5	Auckland Hearts	10	1	5	1	3	1	13	−0.455
6	Canterbury Magicians	10	1	5	0	4	0	12	−0.789

Source: New Zealand Cricket, CricketArchive, ESPNCricinfo

advanced to Final

== Fixtures ==
Teams were originally scheduled to play each other twice at the same ground over a weekend. The schedule was rearranged throughout the season, mainly due to local COVID-19 lockdowns affecting the opening rounds of matches due to be played by Northern Districts and Auckland Hearts.

30 October 2021
Scorecard

Otago Sparks; 291/2 (50 overs)	v	Central Hinds; 78 (26.1 overs)
Katey Martin 111* (74); Melissa Hansen 1/29 (6 overs)		Mikaela Greig 26 (51); Emma Black 5/28 (7 overs)

Otago Sparks won by 213 runs
Saxton Oval, Nelson
Umpires: Eugene Sanders and Glen Walklin

- Central Hinds won the toss and elected to field.
- Points: Otago Sparks 5, Central Hinds 0

31 October 2021
Scorecard

Otago Sparks; 265 (49.2 overs)	v	Central Hinds; 183 (44.4 overs)
Polly Inglis 68 (72); Jess Watkin 4/33 (10 overs)		Cate Pedersen 39 (74); Emma Black 3/23 (10 overs)

Otago Sparks won by 82 runs
Saxton Oval, Nelson
Umpires: Eugene Sanders and Glen Walklin

- Otago Sparks won the toss and elected to bat.
- Points: Otago Sparks 5, Central Hinds 0

6 November 2021
Scorecard

Wellington Blaze; 267/8 (50 overs)	v	Canterbury Magicians; 228/9 (50 overs)
Maddy Green 87* (75); Amy Satterthwaite 2/41 (10 overs)		Amy Satterthwaite 87 (94); Amelia Kerr 5/40 (10 overs)

Wellington Blaze won by 39 runs
Rangiora Recreation Ground, Rangiora
Umpires: Kannan Jagannathan and Kim Cotton

- Wellington Blaze won the toss and elected to bat.
- Points: Wellington Blaze 4, Canterbury Magicians 0

7 November 2021
Scorecard

Canterbury Magicians; 207 (43.1 overs)	v	Wellington Blaze; 208/8 (49 overs)
Amy Satterthwaite 96 (105); Amelia Kerr 5/36 (10 overs)		Amelia Kerr 41 (58); Amy Satterthwaite 3/38 (10 overs)

Wellington Blaze won by 2 wickets
Rangiora Recreation Ground, Rangiora
Umpires: Kannan Jagannathan and Kim Cotton

- Canterbury Magicians won the toss and elected to bat.
- Points: Wellington Blaze 4, Canterbury Magicians 0

13 November 2021
Scorecard

Otago Sparks	v	Central Hinds

Match Abandoned
University of Otago Oval, Dunedin

- No toss.
- No play possible due to rain.
- Points: Otago Sparks 2, Central Hinds 2

13 November 2021
Scorecard

Wellington Blaze	v	Canterbury Magicians

Match Abandoned
Karori Park, Wellington

- No toss.
- No play possible due to rain.
- Points: Wellington Blaze 2, Canterbury Magicians 2

14 November 2021
Scorecard

Otago Sparks	v	Central Hinds

Match Abandoned
University of Otago Oval, Dunedin

- No toss.
- No play possible due to rain.
- Points: Otago Sparks 2, Central Hinds 2

14 November 2021
Scorecard

Wellington Blaze	v	Canterbury Magicians

Match Abandoned
Karori Park, Wellington

- No toss.
- No play possible due to rain.
- Points: Wellington Blaze 2, Canterbury Magicians 2

20 November 2021
Scorecard

Central Hinds; 275/9 (50 overs)	v	Northern Districts; 188 (47.5 overs)
Mikaela Greig 65 (79); Kayley Knight 3/48 (10 overs)		Kate Anderson 26 (21); Jess Watkin 4/28 (10 overs)

Central Hinds won by 87 runs
Donnelly Park, Levin
Umpires: Pete Pasco and Tyron Davies

- Northern Districts won the toss and elected to field.
- Points: Central Hinds 5, Northern Districts 0

20 November 2021
Scorecard

Canterbury Magicians; 197 (45 overs)	v	Otago Sparks; 198/4 (39.1 overs)
Abby Gerken 50 (76); Eden Carson 3/24 (8 overs)		Kate Ebrahim 66 (104); Jacinta Savage 2/49 (8.1 overs)

Otago Sparks won by 6 wickets
Hagley Oval, Christchurch
Umpires: Cory Black and David Henderson

- Otago Sparks won the toss and elected to field.
- Points: Otago Sparks 5, Canterbury Magicians 0

21 November 2021
Scorecard

Central Hinds; 294 (50 overs)	v	Northern Districts; 208 (38.1 overs)
Jess Watkin 87 (62); Kate Anderson 2/43 (10 overs)		Samantha Barriball 55 (55); Monique Rees 3/27 (5 overs)

Central Hinds won by 86 runs
Donnelly Park, Levin
Umpires: Pete Pasco and Tyron Davies

- Northern Districts won the toss and elected to field.
- Points: Central Hinds 5, Northern Districts 0

21 November 2021
Scorecard

Canterbury Magicians; 282/7 (49 overs)	v	Otago Sparks; 278/6 (49 overs)
Abby Gerken 108 (128); Kate Ebrahim 3/45 (7 overs)		Hayley Jensen 76 (73); Amy Satterthwaite 3/43 (9 overs)

Canterbury Magicians won by 7 runs (DLS)
Hagley Oval, Christchurch
Umpires: Cory Black and David Henderson

- Otago Sparks won the toss and elected to field.
- Rain stopped play at 38.1 overs during Canterbury Magicians' innings, match reduced to 49 overs per side.
- Otago Sparks' target was 286 from 49 overs.
- Points: Canterbury Magicians 4, Otago Sparks 0

4 December 2021
Scorecard

Northern Districts	v	Otago Sparks

Match Abandoned
Seddon Park, Hamilton
Umpires: Damian Morrow and Lui Els

- Northern Districts won the toss and elected to field.
- No play possible due to rain.
- Points: Northern Districts 2, Otago Sparks 2

11 December 2021
Scorecard

Otago Sparks; 299/3 (46 overs)	v	Northern Districts
Suzie Bates 138 (120); Emma Baker 1/23 (7 overs)

No Result
University of Otago Oval, Dunedin
Umpires: Shaun Haig and N Louw

- Northern Districts won the toss and elected to field.
- Match reduced to 47 overs per side.
- Otago Sparks innings curtailed at 46 overs.
- Northern Districts' target was 308 runs in 46 overs.
- No further play possible due to rain.
- Points: Northern Districts 2, Otago Sparks 2

18 December 2021
Scorecard

Auckland Hearts; 225/9 (50 overs)	v	Northern Districts; 229/5 (46.5 overs)
Lauren Down 67 (74); Nensi Patel 3/40 (10 overs)		Nensi Patel 71* (90); Fran Jonas 3/34 (10 overs)

Northern Districts won by 5 wickets
Seddon Park, Hamilton
Umpires: John Dempsey and MA Fernandes

- Auckland Hearts won the toss and elected to bat.
- Points: Northern Districts 4, Auckland Hearts 0

3 January 2022
Scorecard

Auckland Hearts; 219 (48.5 overs)	v	Wellington Blaze; 222/2 (41.2 overs)
Lauren Down 124 (143); Amelia Kerr 3/47 (10 overs)		Amelia Kerr 93* (96); Fran Jonas 1/35 (10 overs)

Wellington Blaze won by 8 wickets
Eden Park, Auckland
Umpires: BA O'Brien and Kannan Jagannathan

- Auckland Hearts won the toss and elected to bat.
- Points: Wellington Blaze 4, Auckland Hearts 0

4 January 2022
Scorecard

Wellington Blaze; 277/8 (50 overs)	v	Auckland Hearts; 199 (47.3 overs)
Maddy Green 106 (94); Fran Jonas 2/37 (10 overs)		Saachi Shahri 53 (67); Leigh Kasperek 5/45 (10 overs)

Wellington Blaze won by 78 runs
Eden Park, Auckland
Umpires: Kannan Jagannathan and Vinit Mahna

- Wellington Blaze won the toss and elected to bat.
- Points: Wellington Blaze 5, Auckland Hearts 0

9 January 2022
Scorecard

Auckland Hearts; 239 (50 overs)	v	Northern Districts; 240/2 (46.2 overs)
Lauren Down 55 (89); Nensi Patel 3/46 (10 overs)		Brooke Halliday 106* (126); Arlene Kelly 1/42 (10 overs)

Northern Districts won by 8 wickets
Seddon Park, Hamilton
Umpires: BM Davis and John Dempsey

- Northern Districts won the toss and elected to field.
- Points: Northern Districts 4, Auckland Hearts 0

5 February 2022
Scorecard

Central Hinds	v	Auckland Hearts

Match Abandoned
Pukekura Park, New Plymouth
Umpires: Kannan Jagannathan and T Semmens

- No toss.
- No play possible due to rain.
- Points: Auckland Hearts 2, Central Hinds 2

5 February 2022
Scorecard

Otago Sparks	v	Wellington Blaze

Match Abandoned
Centennial Park, Oamaru
Umpires: Derek Walker and MA Fernandes

- No toss.
- No play possible due to rain.
- Points: Otago Sparks 2, Wellington Blaze 2

5 February 2022
Scorecard

Canterbury Magicians; 229/8 (50 overs)	v	Northern Districts; 230/3 (40.4 overs)
Abby Gerken 49 (73); Nensi Patel 5/46 (10 overs)		Caitlin Gurrey 58 (79); Kristy Havill 2/32 (6 overs)

Northern Districts won by 7 wickets
Seddon Park, Hamilton
Umpires: Christelle High and Damian Morrow

- Canterbury Magicians won the toss and elected to bat.
- Points: Northern Districts 4, Canterbury Magicians 0

6 February 2022
Scorecard

Central Hinds	v	Auckland Hearts

Match Abandoned
Pukekura Park, New Plymouth
Umpires: Kannan Jagannathan and T Semmens

- No toss.
- No play possible due to rain.
- Points: Central Hinds 2, Auckland Hearts 2

6 February 2022
Scorecard

Northern Districts; 171/6 (29 overs)	v	Canterbury Magicians; 45/0 (7 overs)
Kate Anderson 56 (57); Jacinta Savage 2/13 (6 overs)		Abby Gerken 25* (21)

No Result
Seddon Park, Hamilton
Umpires: Christelle High and Damian Morrow

- Canterbury Magicians won the toss and elected to field.
- No further play possible due to rain.
- Points: Canterbury Magicians 2, Northern Districts 2

6 February 2022
Scorecard

Wellington Blaze; 159/7 (33 overs)	v	Otago Sparks; 110 (29.3 overs)
Jess McFadyen 76* (90); Saffron Wilson 3/42 (7 overs)		Kate Ebrahim 31 (62); Xara Jetly 3/19 (6 overs)

Wellington Blaze won by 49 runs
Centennial Park, Oamaru
Umpires: Derek Walker and MA Fernandes

- Otago Sparks won the toss and elected to field.
- Match reduced to 33 overs per side due to rain.
- Points: Wellington Blaze 5, Otago Sparks 0

12 February 2022
Scorecard

Wellington Blaze	v	Central Hinds

Match Abandoned
Basin Reserve, Wellington
Umpires: Damian Morrow and Glen Walklin

- No toss.
- No play possible due to rain.
- Points: Central Hinds 2, Wellington Blaze 2

12 February 2022
Scorecard

Auckland Hearts; 249/9 (50 overs)	v	Canterbury Magicians; 157 (37 overs)
Katie Perkins 85* (75); Sarah Asmussen 4/33 (10 overs)		Melissa Banks 29 (33); Molly Penfold 4/42 (8 overs)

Auckland Hearts won by 92 runs
Eden Park, Auckland
Umpires: Christelle High and Eugene Sanders

- Canterbury Magicians won the toss and elected to field.
- Points: Auckland Hearts 5, Canterbury Magicians 0

13 February 2022
Scorecard

Auckland Hearts	v	Canterbury Magicians

Match Abandoned
Eden Park, Auckland
Umpires: Christelle High and Eugene Sanders

- Canterbury Magicians won the toss and elected to bat.
- No play possible due to rain.
- Points: Auckland Hearts 2, Canterbury Magicians 2

13 February 2022
Scorecard

Wellington Blaze	v	Central Hinds

Match Abandoned
Basin Reserve, Wellington
Umpires: Glen Walklin and Kim Cotton

- No toss.
- No play possible due to rain.
- Points: Central Hinds 2, Wellington Blaze 2

19 February 2022
Scorecard

Auckland Hearts; 185 (44.1 overs)	v	Northern Districts; 188/0 (34.4 overs)
Bella Armstrong 63 (62); Nensi Patel 6/25 (8.1 overs)		Caitlin Gurrey 94* (107)

Northern Districts won by 10 wickets
Seddon Park, Hamilton
Umpires: Christelle High and Glen Walklin

- Northern Districts won the toss and elected to field.
- Points: Northern Districts 5, Auckland Hearts 0

20 February 2022
Scorecard

Auckland Hearts; 167/4 (34 overs)	v	Northern Districts; 212/8 (34 overs)
Prue Catton 46 (72); Makayla Templeton 2/22 (7 overs)		Kate Anderson 74 (61); Amie Hucker 2/38 (7 overs)

Match Tied (DLS)
Seddon Park, Hamilton
Umpires: Christelle High and Glen Walklin

- Northern Districts won the toss and elected to field.
- Match reduced to 34 overs per side when Auckland Hearts were 104/2 from 28 overs.
- Northern Districts target was 213 from 34 overs.
- Points: Auckland Hearts 2, Northern Districts 2

== Final ==
27 February 2022
Scorecard

Otago Sparks; 220/9 (50 overs)	v	Wellington Blaze; 82 (28.5 overs)
Kate Ebrahim 92 (138); Kate Chandler 3/30 (8 overs)		Thamsyn Newton 15 (32); Eden Carson 5/17 (10 overs)

Otago Sparks won by 138 runs
Queenstown Events Centre, Queenstown
Umpires: Cory Black and John Dempsey

- Otago Sparks won the toss and elected to bat.

== Statistics ==
=== Most runs ===
Player	Team	Matches	Innings	Runs	Average	HS	100s	50s
Kate Ebrahim	Otago Sparks	8	7	451	75.16	96*	0	5
Kate Anderson	Northern Districts	8	6	306	51.00	74	0	4
Maddy Green	Wellington Blaze	4	4	265	132.50	106	1	2
Lauren Down	Auckland Hearts	4	4	261	65.25	124	1	2
Abby Gerken	Canterbury Magicians	8	7	249	41.50	108	1	1

Source: ESPN Cricinfo

=== Most wickets ===
Player	Team	Overs	Wickets	Average	BBI	5w
Nensi Patel	Northern Districts	65.1	18	17.83	6/25	2
Amelia Kerr	Wellington Blaze	40.0	14	11.14	5/36	2
Eden Carson	Otago Sparks	47.0	14	11.35	5/17	1
Emma Black	Otago Sparks	43.0	13	13.38	5/28	1
Jess Watkin	Central Hinds	40.0	11	15.81	4/28	0

Source: ESPN Cricinfo
