= England women's cricket team in New Zealand in 2000–01 =

English women's cricket team in New Zealand in 2000–01
	New Zealand	England
- Dates: 17 – 22 November 2000
Captains	Emily Drumm	Clare Connor

One Day International series
- Results: New Zealand won the 3-match series 3–0
Most runs	Emily Drumm (169)	Jane Smit (83)
Most wickets	Clare Nicholson (5)	Lucy Pearson (4)

The English women's cricket team toured New Zealand in November 2000. They played New Zealand in 3 One Day Internationals, with New Zealand winning all three matches. The tour preceded the 2000 Women's Cricket World Cup, which began later that month, also in New Zealand.

== Squads ==
New Zealand	England
Emily Drumm (c); Catherine Campbell; Paula Flannery; Debbie Hockley; Katrina Keenan; Erin McDonald; Clare Nicholson; Rachel Pullar; Kathryn Ramel; Rebecca Rolls (wk); Anna Smith; Haidee Tiffen; Emily Travers; Helen Watson	Clare Connor (c); Arran Brindle; Sarah Collyer; Barbara Daniels; Charlotte Edwards; Laura Harper; Dawn Holden; Kathryn Leng; Lucy Pearson; Melissa Reynard; Nicky Shaw; Jane Smit (wk); Claire Taylor; Clare Taylor

== Tour Matches ==
=== 50-over match: Canterbury v England ===
17 November 2000
Scorecard

Canterbury; 179/8 (50 overs)	v	England; 180/2 (34.5 overs)
Lisa Astle 59 (105); Lucy Pearson 2/27 (10 overs)		Claire Taylor 97* (113); Hannah Rae 1/20 (6.5 overs)

England Women won by 8 wickets
Christ's College, Christchurch
Umpires: Jim Henderson (NZ) and Markham Lee (NZ)

- Canterbury Women won the toss and elected to bat.

== WODI Series ==
=== 1st ODI ===
19 November 2000
Scorecard

New Zealand; 275/5 (50 overs)	v	England; 110/7 (50 overs)
Emily Drumm 116 (152); Lucy Pearson 1/39 (10 overs)		Jane Smit 33* (99); Rachel Pullar 2/9 (5 overs)

New Zealand Women won by 165 runs
Centennial Park, Oamaru, Oamaru
Umpires: Graham Wilkinson (NZ) and Steve Dunne (NZ)

- New Zealand Women won the toss and elected to bat.

=== 2nd ODI ===
21 November 2000
Scorecard

England; 134 (50 overs)	v	New Zealand; 135/8 (45.2 overs)
Jane Smit 48* (92); Clare Nicholson 2/17 (10 overs)		Rebecca Rolls 34 (34); Sarah Collyer 3/20 (10 overs)

New Zealand Women won by 2 wickets
Aorangi Oval, Timaru
Umpires: Dave Quested (NZ) and Gary Baxter (NZ)

- England Women won the toss and elected to bat.
- Erin McDonald (NZ) made her WODI debut.

=== 3rd ODI ===
22 November 2000
Scorecard

England; 109 (41 overs)	v	New Zealand; 110/2 (30.2 overs)
Nicky Shaw 35 (56); Katrina Keenan 3/15 (7 overs)		Emily Drumm 43* (77); Clare Taylor 1/17 (5 overs)

New Zealand Women won by 8 wickets
Aorangi Oval, Timaru
Umpires: Dave Quested (NZ) and Gary Baxter (NZ)

- England Women won the toss and elected to bat.
- Emily Travers (NZ) made her WODI debut.
