= Nensi Patel =

New Zealand cricketer (born 2002)

Personal information
- Full name: Nensi Hiteshkumar Patel
- Born: 27 May 2002 (age 24); Bharuch, Gujarat, India
- Batting: Right-handed
- Bowling: Right-arm off break
- Role: Bowler

International information
- National side: New Zealand
- ODI debut: 05 March 2026 v Zimbabwe
- Last ODI: 04 April 2026 v South Africa
- ODI shirt no.: 51
- T20I debut: 25 February 2026 v Zimbabwe
- Last T20I: 25 March 2026 v South Africa
- T20I shirt no.: 51

Domestic team information
- Years: Team
- 2016/17–present: Northern Districts

Career statistics
Competition	WODI	WT20I	WLA	WT20
Matches	4	4	82	81
Runs scored	12	-	1302	709
Batting average	-	-	24.56	14.46
100s/50s	0/0	0/0	0/7	0/1
Top score	12*	-	77	57
Balls bowled	174	96	3,629	1,375
Wickets	3	6	91	72
Bowling average	34	9.5	27.75	19.95
5 wickets in innings	0	0	2	0
10 wickets in match	0	0	0	0
Best bowling	1/16	3/8	6/25	4/19
Catches/stumpings	3/–	2/–	32/–	26/–
- Source: NDCricket, 7 April 2026

Nensi Hiteshkumar Patel (born 27 May 2002) is an Indian-born New Zealand cricketer who currently plays for the New Zealand women's cricket team and Northern Districts in domestic cricket. She plays as a right-arm off break bowler.

== Career ==
Patel plays for Northern Districts in the Hallyburton Johnstone Shield and the Super Smash. She made her List A debut against Auckland in the 2016–17 New Zealand Women's One-Day Competition on 26 November 2016. She made her T20 debut the day before, also against Auckland, in the 2016–17 New Zealand Women's Twenty20 Competition on 25 November 2016.

She took her first List A 5-wicket haul (5-46) in the 2021–22 Hallyburton Johnstone Shield against Canterbury on 5 February 2022. Two weeks laters, she took 6-25 against Auckland on 19 February 2022 to record her second 5-for. She finished that season as the leading wicket taker in the competition, with 18 wickets at 17.83

In June 2022, she was awarded her maiden central contract by NZC for the 2022–23 season, although she did not debut until the Zimbabwe Tour of New Zealand in February 2026, debuting in both the ODIs and T20Is.
