= 2016–17 New Zealand Women's Twenty20 Competition =

- Dates: 25 November 2016 – 11 February 2017
- Administrator: New Zealand Cricket
- Cricket format: Twenty20
- Tournament format(s): Round robin and final
- Champions: Otago Sparks (1st title)
- Participants: 6
- Matches: 16
- Most runs: Frances Mackay (223)
- Most wickets: Leigh Kasperek (8)

The 2016–17 New Zealand Women's Twenty20 Competition was the tenth season of the women's Twenty20 cricket competition played in New Zealand. It ran from November 2016 to February 2017, with 6 provincial teams taking part. Otago Sparks beat Canterbury Magicians in a close finish, winning the final by 5 runs and claiming their first Twenty20 title.

The tournament ran alongside the 2016–17 New Zealand Women's One-Day Competition.

== Competition format ==
Teams played in a round-robin in a group of six, each playing 5 group matches overall. Matches were played using a Twenty20 format. The top two teams in the group advanced to the final.

The group worked on a points system with positions being based on the total points. Points were awarded as follows:

Win: 4 points
Tie: 2 points
Loss: 0 points.
Abandoned/No Result: 2 points.

== Points table ==
Team	Pld	W	L	T	NR	Pts	NRR
Canterbury Magicians	5	4	0	0	1	18	0.438
Otago Sparks	5	2	2	0	1	10	0.568
Auckland Hearts	5	2	2	0	1	10	0.535
Northern Spirit	5	2	2	0	1	10	0.249
Wellington Blaze	5	1	3	0	1	6	–0.443
Central Hinds	5	1	3	0	1	6	–1.351

Source: ESPN Cricinfo

Advanced to the Final

== Final ==
10 February 2017
Scorecard

Otago Sparks; 133/6 (20 overs)	v	Canterbury Magicians; 128/8 (20 overs)
Suzie Bates 74 (52); Frances Mackay 2/14 (4 overs)		Amy Satterthwaite 38 (44); Kate Heffernan 4/21 (4 overs)

Otago Sparks won by 5 runs
MainPower Oval, Rangiora
Umpires: Eugene Sanders and Kim Cotton

- Canterbury Magicians won the toss and elected to field.

== Statistics ==
=== Most runs ===
Player	Team	Matches	Innings	Runs	Average	HS	100s	50s
Frances Mackay	Canterbury Magicians	5	5	223	55.75	61*	0	2
Natalie Dodd	Northern Spirit	5	5	203	67.66	70*	0	2
Katie Perkins	Auckland Hearts	5	4	162	81.00	75*	0	1
Suzie Bates	Otago Sparks	4	4	161	40.25	74	0	1
Anna Peterson	Auckland Hearts	5	5	152	30.40	48	0	0

Source: ESPN Cricinfo

=== Most wickets ===
Player	Team	Overs	Wickets	Average	BBI	5w
Leigh Kasperek	Otago Sparks	20.0	8	15.50	3/24	0
Kate Heffernan	Otago Sparks	8.0	6	11.00	4/26	0
Jacinta Savage	Canterbury Magicians	8.0	6	7.50	4/26	0
Frances Mackay	Canterbury Magicians	18.0	6	16.33	2/14	0
Michelle McKay	Central Hinds	15.0	6	18.50	3/28	0

Source: ESPN Cricinfo
