= New Zealand women's cricket team in India in 2015 =

International cricket tour

New Zealand women's cricket team in India
| | India women | New Zealand women |
- Dates: 28 June 2015 – 15 July 2015
| Captains | Mithali Raj | Suzie Bates |

One Day International series
- Results: India women won the 5-match series 3–2
| Most runs | Thirush Kamini (158) | Sophie Devine (181) |
| Most wickets | Rajeshwari Gayakwad (8) | Leigh Kasperek (6) |

Twenty20 International series
- Results: New Zealand women won the 3-match series 2–1
| Most runs | Veda Krishnamurthy (77); Vellaswamy Vanitha (77) | Sophie Devine (102) |
| Most wickets | Rajeshwari Gayakwad (5) | Kate Broadmore (6) |

The New Zealand women's national cricket team toured India from 28 June to 15 July playing a series of five One Day Internationals (ODIs) and three Twenty20 Internationals (T20Is). All the tour matches (five ODIs, three T20I and one tour match against India A Women) were hosted at the M. Chinnaswamy Stadium in Bangalore. Initially Alur (North Bangalore) was selected to host the three T20I, but eventually the matches were moved to M Chinnaswamy Stadium. The first three of five ODIs matches were part of the 2014–16 ICC Women's Championship. The hosts won the ODI series by 3–2, whereas the tourists secured a victory in T20I series by 2–1.

== Squads ==
| ODIs | | T20Is | |
| India | New Zealand | India | New Zealand |
|---|---|---|---|
| Mithali Raj (c); Jhulan Goswami; Harmanpreet Kaur; Smriti Mandhana; Poonam Raut; Shikha Pandey; Thirush Kamini; Ravi Kalpana (wk); Veda Krishnamurthy; Deepti Sharma; Rajeshwari Gayakwad; Ekta Bisht; Sneh Rana; Poonam Yadav; Niranjana Nagarajan | Suzie Bates (c); Sophie Devine (vc); Kate Broadmore; Natalie Dodd; Maddy Green; Georgia Guy; Leigh Kasperek; Morna Nielsen; Katie Perkins; Anna Peterson; Rachel Priest (wk); Hannah Rowe; Amy Satterthwaite; Lea Tahuhu | Mithali Raj (c); Ekta Bisht; Rajeshwari Gayakwad; Jhulan Goswami; Harmanpreet Kaur; Veda Krishnamurthy; Latika Kumari; Smriti Mandhana; Shikha Pandey; Anuja Patil; Poonam Yadav; Sneh Rana; Shubhlakshmi Sharma; Vellaswamy Vanitha; Sushma Verma (wk) | Suzie Bates (c); Sophie Devine (vc); Kate Broadmore; Natalie Dodd; Maddy Green; Georgia Guy; Leigh Kasperek; Morna Nielsen; Katie Perkins; Anna Peterson; Rachel Priest (wk); Hannah Rowe; Amy Satterthwaite; Lea Tahuhu |

== Tour matches ==
=== 50-over match: India A Women vs New Zealand Women ===
Tour match
26 June
9:00
Scorecard

| New Zealand Women; 256 (50 overs) | v | India A Women; 159 (49 overs) |
| Katie Perkins 45 (42); Preeti Bose 3/32 (10 overs) | | Priya Punia 42 (59); Morna Nielsen 3/22 (9 overs) |

New Zealand Women won by 97 runs.
M. Chinnaswamy Stadium, Bangalore
Umpires: NR Seetharam Prabhu (Ind) and Nagaraj Ramesh (Ind)

- New Zealand women won the toss and elected to bat.
- Players per side India A Women 12 (12 batting, 11 fielding); New Zealand Women 14 (12 batting, 11 fielding).

== ODI Series ==
=== 1st ODI ===
ICC Women's Championship
28 June
9:00
Scorecard

| India; 142 (44.3 overs) | v | New Zealand; 125 (45.3 overs) |
| Jhulan Goswami 57 (67); Morna Nielsen 3/24 (10 overs) | | Suzie Bates 28 (57); Sneh Rana 3/26 (9 overs) |

India Women won by 17 runs.
M. Chinnaswamy Stadium, Bangalore
Umpires: Sadashiv Iyer (Ind) and Ulhas Gandhe (Ind)

- India Women won the toss and elected to bat.
- Ravi Kalpana (Ind) and Leigh Kasperek (NZ) made their ODI debuts.
- ICC Women's Championship points: India Women 2, New Zealand Women 0

=== 2nd ODI ===
ICC Women's Championship
1 July
9:00
Scorecard

| India; 163 (49.3 overs) | v | New Zealand; 164/7 (44.2 overs) |
| Thirush Kamini 61 (69); Suzie Bates 3/21 (6 overs) | | Sophie Devine 33 (62); Jhulan Goswami 2/14 (10 overs) |

New Zealand Women won by 3 wickets.
M. Chinnaswamy Stadium, Bangalore
Umpires: Saiyed Khalid (Ind) and Tapan Sharma (Ind)

- India Women won the toss and elected to bat.
- ICC Women's Championship points: India Women 0, New Zealand Women 2

=== 3rd ODI ===
ICC Women's Championship
3 July
9:00
Scorecard

| India; 182/9 (50 overs) | v | New Zealand; 186/4 (45.4 overs) |
| Veda Krishnamurthy 61(85); Sophie Devine 3/40 (10 overs) | | Rachel Priest 64(101); Harmanpreet Kaur 1/14 (4 overs) |

New Zealand Women won by 6 wickets.
M. Chinnaswamy Stadium, Bangalore
Umpires: Ulhas Gandhe (Ind) and Tapan Sharma (Ind)

- India Women won the toss and elected to bat.
- ICC Women's Championship points: India Women 0, New Zealand Women 2

=== 4th ODI ===
6 July
09:00
Scorecard

| New Zealand; 220 (49.5 overs) | v | India; 221/2 (44.2 overs) |
| Sophie Devine 89 (102); Rajeshwari Gayakwad 3/25 (10 overs) | | Mithali Raj 81* (88); Anna Peterson 1/19 (4 overs) |

India Women won by 8 wickets
M. Chinnaswamy Stadium, Bangalore
Umpires: Saiyed Khalid (Ind) and Sadashiv Iyer (Ind)

- New Zealand Women won the toss and elected to bat.

=== 5th ODI ===
8 July
09:00
Scorecard

| New Zealand; 118 (41 overs) | v | India; 121/1 (27.2 overs) |
| Suzie Bates 42(85); Rajeshwari Gayakwad 2/15 (8 overs) | | Thirush Kamini 62*(78); Morna Nielsen 1/23 (4 overs) |

India Women won by 9 wickets
M. Chinnaswamy Stadium, Bangalore
Umpires: Subrat Das (Ind) and Umesh Dubey (Ind)

- New Zealand Women won the toss and elected to bat

== T20I series ==
=== 1st T20I ===
11 July
10:00
Scorecard

| India; 125 (19.5 overs) | v | New Zealand; 126/2 (12.3 overs) |
| Mithali Raj 35 (23); Kate Broadmore 3/16 (4 overs) | | Sophie Devine 70 (22); Jhulan Goswami 1/19 (2 overs) |

New Zealand Women won by 8 wickets
M. Chinnaswamy Stadium, Bangalore
Umpires: Yeshwant Barde and Sivasubramaniyan Shankar (Ind)

- New Zealand Women won the toss and elected to field.
- Natalie Dodd and Leigh Kasperek (NZ) both made their T20I debut.

=== 2nd T20I ===
13 July
10:00
Scorecard

| India; 136/6 (20 overs) | v | New Zealand; 139/4 (17.5 overs) |
| Vellaswamy Vanitha 41 (39); Sophie Devine 2/31 (4 overs) | | Rachel Priest 60 (34); Jhulan Goswami 2/29 (3 overs) |

New Zealand Women won by 6 wickets.
M. Chinnaswamy Stadium, Bangalore
Umpires: Umesh Dubey and Sivasubramaniyan Shankar (Ind)

- New Zealand Women won the toss and elected to field.
- Hannah Rowe (NZ) made her T20I debut.

=== 3rd T20I ===
15 July
10:00
Scorecard

| New Zealand; 126/8 (20 overs) | v | India; 128/7 (19 overs) |
| Suzie Bates 34 (27); Rajeshwari Gayakwad 3/17 (4 overs) | | Veda Krishnamurthy 34 (19); Sophie Devine 2/13 (4 overs) |

India won by 3 wickets
M. Chinnaswamy Stadium, Bangalore
Umpires: Yeshwant Barde (Ind) and Subrat Das (Ind)

- India Women won the toss and elected to field
