= Pakistan women's cricket team in New Zealand in 2016–17 =

International cricket tour

	New Zealand women	Pakistan women
- Dates: 9 – 21 November 2016
Captains	Suzie Bates	Sana Mir (ODIs); Bismah Maroof (T2OI)

One Day International series
- Results: New Zealand women won the 5-match series 5–0
Most runs	Amy Satterthwaite (393)	Javeria Khan (153)
Most wickets	Thamsyn Newton (7)	Sana Mir (5)
- Player of the series: Amy Satterthwaite (NZ)

Twenty20 International series
- Results: New Zealand women won the 1-match series 1–0
Most runs	Liz Perry (26)	Aliya Riaz (22)
Most wickets	Amelia Kerr (3)	Sana Mir (2)

Pakistan women's cricket team toured New Zealand in November 2016. The tour consisted of a series of five Women's One Day Internationals (WODIs), the last three being part of the 2014–16 ICC Women's Championship, and a Women's Twenty20 International (WT20I). New Zealand women won the WODI series 5–0 and won the one-off WT20I match by 14 runs.

== Squads ==
New Zealand	Pakistan
Suzie Bates (c); Samantha Curtis; Sophie Devine; Holly Huddleston; Amelia Kerr; Katey Martin; Thamsyn Newton; Morna Nielsen; Katie Perkins; Liz Perry; Rachel Priest; Hannah Rowe; Amy Satterthwaite; Lea Tahuhu	Sana Mir (c, ODIs); Bismah Maroof (c, T20I); Javeria Khan; Asmavia Iqbal; Nida Dar; Anam Amin; Sadia Yousuf; Maham Tariq; Nain Abidi; Nahida Khan; Ayesha Zafar; Sidra Nawaz; Aliya Riaz; Iram Javed; Diana Baig

== ODI series ==
=== 1st ODI ===
9 November 2016
Scorecard

Pakistan; 156 (49 overs)	v	New Zealand; 157/2 (23 overs)
Asmavia Iqbal 49* (69); Lea Tahuhu 3/37 (10 overs)		Suzie Bates 64 (46); Nida Dar 1/17 (3 overs)

New Zealand women won by 8 wickets
Bert Sutcliffe Oval, Lincoln
Umpires: John Bromley (NZ) and Garth Stirrat (NZ)
Player of the match: Lea Tahuhu (NZ)

- New Zealand Women won the toss and elected to field.
- Amelia Kerr (NZ) made her WODI debut.

=== 2nd ODI ===
11 November 2016
Scorecard

New Zealand; 309/4 (50 overs)	v	Pakistan; 142/4 (34.2 overs)
Amy Satterthwaite 137* (117); Sadia Yousuf 1/43 (10 overs)		Nain Abidi 45 (56); Suzie Bates 2/21 (5 overs)

New Zealand Women won by 60 runs (DLS method)
Bert Sutcliffe Oval, Lincoln
Umpires: John Bromley (NZ) and Eugene Sanders (NZ)
Player of the match: Amy Satterthwaite (NZ)

- New Zealand Women won the toss and elected to bat.
- No play was possible after 34.2 overs of Pakistan Women's innings due to rain. The target was revised to 203 by DLS method.

=== 3rd ODI ===
ICC Women's Championship
13 November 2016
Scorecard

Pakistan; 263/6 (50 overs)	v	New Zealand; 267/2 (44.2 overs)
Bismah Maroof 91* (98); Amy Satterthwaite 2/65 (10 overs)		Amy Satterthwaite 115* (101); Sana Mir 2/43 (10 overs)

New Zealand Women won by 8 wickets
Bert Sutcliffe Oval, Lincoln
Umpires: Kathy Cross (NZ) and Eugene Sanders (NZ)
Player of the match: Amy Satterthwaite (NZ)

- Pakistan Women won the toss and elected to bat.
- ICC Women's Championship points: New Zealand Women 2, Pakistan Women 0.

=== 4th ODI ===
ICC Women's Championship
17 November 2016
Scorecard

Pakistan; 158 (48.1 overs)	v	New Zealand; 162/3 (22.3 overs)
Ayesha Zafar 52 (83); Holly Huddleston 4/20 (7.1 overs)		Suzie Bates 66 (52); Javeria Khan 1/16 (1.3 overs)

New Zealand Women won by 7 wickets
Saxton Oval, Nelson
Umpires: John Dempsey (NZ) and R. G. Hooper (NZ)
Player of the match: Holly Huddleston (NZ)

- New Zealand Women won the toss and elected to field.
- ICC Women's Championship points: New Zealand Women 2, Pakistan Women 0.
- By winning this match New Zealand Women qualified for the 2017 Women's Cricket World Cup.

=== 5th ODI ===
ICC Women's Championship
19 November 2016
Scorecard

Pakistan; 220 (49.5 overs)	v	New Zealand; 223/5 (38.3 overs)
Ayesha Zafar 50 (68); Javeria Khan 50 (68); Thamsyn Newton 5/31 (8 overs)		Amy Satterthwaite 123 (99); Sadia Yousuf 3/49 (10 overs)

New Zealand Women won by 5 wickets
Saxton Oval, Nelson
Umpires: John Dempsey (NZ) and R. G. Hooper (NZ)
Player of the match: Thamsyn Newton (NZ)

- Pakistan Women won the toss and elected to bat.
- Amy Satterthwaite (NZ) became the first woman to score a century in three consecutive innings in ODIs.
- ICC Women's Championship points: New Zealand Women 2, Pakistan Women 0.

== Only T20I ==
21 November 2016
Scorecard

New Zealand; 118/9 (20 overs)	v	Pakistan; 104 (20 overs)
Liz Perry 26 (21); Sana Mir 2/18 (4 overs)		Aliya Riaz 28* (22); Amelia Kerr 3/16 (4 overs)

New Zealand Women won by 14 runs
Saxton Oval, Nelson
Umpires: Kathy Cross (NZ) and Diana Venter (NZ)
Player of the match: Lea Tahuhu (NZ)

- New Zealand Women won the toss and elected to bat.
- Amelia Kerr (NZ) made her WT20I debut.
