= Eden Carson =

New Zealand cricketer (born 2001)

Personal information
- Full name: Eden Jean Carson
- Born: 8 August 2001 (age 25); Dunedin, New Zealand
- Batting: Right-handed
- Bowling: Right-arm off break
- Role: Bowler

International information
- National side: New Zealand (2022–present)
- ODI debut (cap 145): 22 September 2022 v West Indies
- Last ODI: 26 October 2025 v England
- T20I debut (cap 58): 30 July 2022 v South Africa
- Last T20I: 26 March 2025 v Australia
- T20I shirt no.: 4

Domestic team information
- Years: Team
- 2018/19–present: Otago

Career statistics
Competition	WODI	WT20I	WLA	WT20
Matches	24	37	85	103
Runs scored	12	29	473	145
Batting average	1.71	4.82	13.51	6.04
100s/50s	0/0	0/0	0/3	0/0
Top score	4*	7	59*	17*
Balls bowled	992	684	3,572	2,021
Wickets	18	39	100	116
Bowling average	45.72	19.10	27.74	18.37
5 wickets in innings	0	0	2	2
10 wickets in match	0	0	0	0
Best bowling	3/31	3/18	5/17	5/18
Catches/stumpings	8/–	7/–	23/–	20/–
Medal record
Women's cricket
Representing New Zealand
ICC T20 World Cup
Winner	2024 UAE
Commonwealth Games
Bronze medal – third place	2022 Birmingham
- Source: CricketArchive, 25 November 2025

Eden Jean Carson (born 8 August 2001) is a New Zealand cricketer who currently plays for Otago and New Zealand. She plays as a right-arm off break bowler.

== Early life ==
Carson was born on 8 August 2001 in Dunedin.

== Domestic career ==
Carson made her debut for Otago in 2018, against Wellington in the 2018–19 Hallyburton Johnstone Shield. She took her maiden Twenty20 five-wicket haul in 2020, taking 5/18 against Central Hinds. She scored her maiden half-century in 2019, scoring 51 not out against Auckland in the 2019–20 Hallyburton Johnstone Shield. She took her maiden List A five-wicket haul in 2022, taking 5/17 against Wellington in the final of the Hallyburton Johnstone Shield as her side won by 138 runs. She took 31 wickets during the 2021–22 season, ending as the third-highest wicket-taker in the Hallyburton Johnstone Shield and fourth-highest wicket-taker in the 2021–22 Super Smash.

== International career ==
Carson was offered a "surprise" central contract by New Zealand Cricket in May 2022, one of six players to be offered their first such contract. She earned her first call-up to the New Zealand side in June 2022, being picked in the squad for the 2022 Commonwealth Games. She made her Twenty20 International debut on 30 July 2022, against South Africa in New Zealand's first match at the Commonwealth Games. She made her One Day International debut on 22 September 2022, against the West Indies, in which she took 3/31 from her 8 overs. At the 2023 ICC Women's T20 World Cup, Carson was ever-present for New Zealand, taking six wickets at an average of 11.33.

In 2024, Carson was named in the New Zealand Māori women's cricket team for the 2024 Women's T20I Pacific Cup.

In September 2024 she was named in the New Zealand squad for the 2024 ICC Women's T20 World Cup. Carson was awarded player of the match in the final group game against Pakistan for her 2/7 and in the semi-final with the West Indies after taking 3/29. She then took 1/22 from her four overs as New Zealand beat South Africa in the final.

Carson was named in the New Zealand squad for their ODI tour to India in October 2024.
