= New Zealand women's cricket team in England in 2026 =

International cricket tour

	England	New Zealand
- Dates: 10 – 25 May 2026
Captains	Charlie Dean	Amelia Kerr

One Day International series
- Results: 3-match series drawn 1–1
Most runs	Maia Bouchier (59)	Maddy Green (125)
Most wickets	Lauren Bell (5)	Rosemary Mair (5)
- Player of the series: Maddy Green (NZ)

Twenty20 International series
- Results: England won the 3-match series 2–1
Most runs	Alice Capsey (99)	Sophie Devine (132)
Most wickets	Linsey Smith (6)	Bree Illing (4)
- Player of the series: Linsey Smith (Eng)

The New Zealand women's cricket team toured England in May 2026 to play the England women's cricket team. The tour consisted of three One Day International (ODI) and three Twenty20 International (T20I) matches. The ODI series formed part of the 2025–2029 ICC Women's Championship. The T20I series served as preparation for both teams ahead of the 2026 Women's T20 World Cup. In July 2025, the England and Wales Cricket Board (ECB) confirmed the fixtures for the tour, as a part of the 2026 home international season.

== Squads ==
England		New Zealand	
ODIs	T20Is	ODIs	T20Is
Charlie Dean (c); ~~Nat Sciver-Brunt (c)~~; ~~Emily Arlott~~; Lauren Bell; Maia Bouchier; Alice Capsey; Kira Chathli; Tilly Corteen-Coleman; Sophie Ecclestone; Lauren Filer; ~~Mahika Gaur~~; Dani Gibson; Jodi Grewcock; Amy Jones (wk); Freya Kemp; Heather Knight; Emma Lamb; Charis Pavely (Note: In squad for first ODI only.); Linsey Smith; Alexa Stonehouse (Note: In squad for second and third ODI only.); Issy Wong	Charlie Dean (c); ~~Nat Sciver-Brunt (c)~~; Lauren Bell; Maia Bouchier; Alice Capsey; Tilly Corteen-Coleman; Sophia Dunkley; Sophie Ecclestone; Lauren Filer; Dani Gibson; Amy Jones (wk); Freya Kemp; Heather Knight; Charis Pavely; Linsey Smith; Issy Wong; ~~Danni Wyatt-Hodge~~	Amelia Kerr (c); Suzie Bates; Flora Devonshire; Izzy Gaze (wk); Maddy Green; Brooke Halliday; Bree Illing; Polly Inglis (wk); Jess Kerr; Emma McLeod; Rosemary Mair; Nensi Patel; Molly Penfold; Georgia Plimmer; Izzy Sharp (wk)	Amelia Kerr (c); Suzie Bates; Sophie Devine; Flora Devonshire; Izzy Gaze (wk); Maddy Green; Brooke Halliday; Bree Illing; Polly Inglis (wk); Jess Kerr; Rosemary Mair; Nensi Patel; Georgia Plimmer; Izzy Sharp (wk); Lea Tahuhu

On 3 May 2026, Nat Sciver-Brunt was ruled out of the ODI series due to a calf injury. Charlie Dean, who was previously rested for the ODI series, was recalled to the squad and named captain, whilst Maia Bouchier was added as cover. On 8 May 2026, Mahika Gaur was ruled out of the ODI series due to a foot fracture. On 10 May 2026, Em Arlott was ruled out of the ODI series due to concussion with Alexa Stonehouse added as cover.

On 19 May 2026, Nat Sciver-Brunt was ruled out of the T20I series for ongoing rehabilitation, whilst Danni Wyatt-Hodge was ruled out to await the birth of her first child. Maia Bouchier and Charis Pavely were both added as cover.

== Tour match ==
6 May 2026
11:00
Scorecard

New Zealand; 200 (47.3 overs)	v	ECB Development Women's XI; 182 (48.5 overs)
Jess Kerr 44 (50); Phoebe Brett 5/27 (8.3 overs)		Georgie Boyce 32 (41); Suzie Bates 3/13 (5 overs)

New Zealand won by 18 runs
Riverside Ground, Chester-le-Street
Umpires: Gabi Brown (Eng) and Sue Redfern (Eng)

- New Zealand won the toss and elected to bat.

== ODI series ==
=== 1st ODI ===
10 May 2026
11:00
Scorecard

New Zealand; 210 (48.4 overs)	v	England; 211/9 (48.2 overs)
Maddy Green 88 (107); Charlie Dean 2/21 (7 overs)		Maia Bouchier 59 (69); Rosemary Mair 3/42 (10 overs)

England won by 1 wicket
Riverside Ground, Chester-le-Street
Umpires: Rose Fernando (SL) and Jacqueline Williams (WI)
Player of the match: Charlie Dean (Eng)

- England won the toss and elected to field.
- Tilly Corteen-Coleman, Danielle Gibson and Jodi Grewcock (Eng) all made their ODI debuts.
- Women's Championship points: England 2, New Zealand 0.

=== 2nd ODI ===
13 May 2026
13:00 (D/N)
Scorecard

England	v	New Zealand

No result
County Ground, Northampton
Umpires: Gabi Brown (Eng) and Anna Harris (Eng)

- New Zealand won the toss and elected to field.
- No play was possible due to rain.
- Women's Championship points: England 1, New Zealand 1.

=== 3rd ODI ===
16 May 2026
11:00
Scorecard

England; 181/7 (33 overs)	v	New Zealand; 141/4 (24.4 overs)
Alice Capsey 45 (45); Bree Illing 2/29 (7 overs)		Brooke Halliday 42* (54); Lauren Bell 3/29 (5.4 overs)

New Zealand won by 17 runs (DLS method)
Sophia Gardens, Cardiff
Umpires: Sue Redfern (Eng) and Jacqueline Williams (WI)
Player of the match: Brooke Halliday (NZ)

- New Zealand won the toss and elected to field.
- The match was reduced to 33 overs per side due to rain.
- New Zealand were set a revised target of 184 runs in 33 overs.
- Heather Knight (Eng) played in her last ODI.
- Women's Championship points: New Zealand 2, England 0.

== T20I series ==
=== 1st T20I ===
20 May 2026
18:30 (N)
Scorecard

New Zealand; 136/7 (20 overs)	v	England; 140/3 (17.2 overs)
Sophie Devine 45 (22); Lauren Bell 2/23 (4 overs)		Alice Capsey 74* (51); Bree Illing 2/19 (4 overs)

England won by 7 wickets
County Ground, Derby
Umpires: Anna Harris (Eng) and Jacqueline Williams (WI)
Player of the match: Alice Capsey (Eng)

- England won the toss and elected to field.

=== 2nd T20I ===
23 May 2026
14:30
Scorecard

New Zealand; 170/5 (20 overs)	v	England; 156/6 (20 overs)
Sophie Devine 87 (57); Linsey Smith 3/25 (4 overs)		Maia Bouchier 38 (33); Nensi Patel 2/25 (4 overs)

New Zealand won by 14 runs
St Lawrence Ground, Canterbury
Umpires: Gabi Brown (Eng) and Sue Redfern (Eng)
Player of the match: Sophie Devine (NZ)

- New Zealand won the toss and elected to bat.

=== 3rd T20I ===
25 May 2026
14:30
Scorecard

New Zealand; 80 (19.1 overs)	v	England; 81/3 (13.5 overs)
Jess Kerr 20 (27); Charlie Dean 3/13 (3.1 overs)		Sophia Dunkley 22 (21); Nensi Patel 1/7 (2 overs)

England won by 7 wickets
County Ground, Hove
Umpires: Sue Redfern (Eng) and Jacqueline Williams (WI)
Player of the match: Dani Gibson (Eng)

- New Zealand won the toss and elected to bat.
