= 2009–10 New Zealand Cricket Women's Twenty20 =

- Dates: 4 December 2009 – 30 January 2010
- Administrator: New Zealand Cricket
- Cricket format: Twenty20
- Tournament format(s): Round robin and final
- Champions: Central Hinds (1st title)
- Participants: 6
- Matches: 16
- Most runs: Nicola Browne (150)
- Most wickets: Sarah Tsukigawa (11)

The 2009–10 New Zealand Cricket Women's Twenty20 was the third season of the women's Twenty20 cricket competition played in New Zealand. It ran from December 2009 to January 2010, with 6 provincial teams taking part. Central Hinds beat Auckland Hearts in the final to win the tournament, their first Twenty20 title.

The tournament ran alongside the 2009–10 New Zealand Cricket Women's One Day Competition, which Central Hinds also won.

== Competition format ==
Teams played in a round-robin in a group of six, playing 5 matches overall. Matches were played using a Twenty20 format. The top two in the group advanced to the final.

The group worked on a points system with positions being based on the total points. Points were awarded as follows:

Win: 4 points
Tie: 2 points
Loss: 0 points.
Abandoned/No Result: 2 points.

== Points table ==
Team	Pld	W	L	T	NR	Pts	NRR
Central Hinds	5	4	0	0	1	18	1.942
Auckland Hearts	5	4	1	0	0	16	–0.143
Wellington Blaze	5	3	1	0	1	14	0.559
Otago Sparks	5	1	4	0	0	4	–0.224
Northern Spirit	5	1	4	0	0	4	–0.481
Canterbury Magicians	5	1	4	0	0	4	–1.101

Source: ESPN Cricinfo

Advanced to the Final

== Final ==
30 January 2010
Scorecard

Auckland Hearts; 88/8 (20 overs)	v	Central Hinds; 89/2 (19.4 overs)
Megan Tremaine 27 (41); Aimee Watkins 3/14 (3 overs)		Rachel Priest 45* (62); Natalee Scripps 1/17 (3.4 overs)

Central Hinds won 8 wickets
Nelson Park, Napier
Umpires: Evan Gray and Phil Jones

- Central Hinds won the toss and elected to field.

== Statistics ==
=== Most runs ===
Player	Team	Matches	Innings	Runs	Average	HS	100s	50s
Nicola Browne	Northern Spirit	5	5	150	50.00	47*	0	0
Sophie Devine	Wellington Blaze	4	4	134	44.66	48*	0	0
Megan Tremaine	Auckland Hearts	6	6	132	33.00	50*	0	1
Sara McGlashan	Central Hinds	5	5	120	40.00	38*	0	0
Aimee Watkins	Central Hinds	5	5	112	28.00	76*	0	1

Source: ESPN Cricinfo

=== Most wickets ===
Player	Team	Overs	Wickets	Average	BBI	5w
Sarah Tsukigawa	Otago Sparks	19.0	11	10.00	4/18	0
Saskia Bullen	Auckland Hearts	24.0	9	11.66	3/12	0
Aimee Watkins	Central Hinds	14.0	8	9.87	3/12	0
Erin Bermingham	Canterbury Magicians	17.1	7	12.14	4/14	0
Sophie Devine	Wellington Blaze	15.0	6	11.16	2/11	0

Source: ESPN Cricinfo
