= Tilly Corteen-Coleman =

English cricketer

Personal information
- Full name: Matilda Rose Corteen-Coleman
- Born: 23 August 2007 (age 19); Canterbury, Kent, England
- Batting: Left-handed
- Bowling: Slow left-arm orthodox
- Role: Bowler

International information
- National side: England (2026–present)
- ODI debut (cap 154): 10 May 2026 v New Zealand
- Last ODI: 13 May 2026 v New Zealand

Domestic team information
- Years: Team
- 2024: Kent
- 2024: South East Stars
- 2024–present: Southern Brave
- 2025–present: Surrey

Career statistics
Competition	WODI	WLA	WT20
Matches	2	26	42
Runs scored	3	16	12
Batting average	–	2.66	12.00
100s/50s	0/0	0/0	0/0
Top score	3*	4	4*
Balls bowled	60	1179	817
Wickets	2	28	43
Bowling average	24.50	30.00	21.58
5 wickets in innings	0	0	1
10 wickets in match	0	0	0
Best bowling	2/49	3/27	5/19
Catches/stumpings	–/–	8/–	15/–
Medal record
Women's cricket
Representing England
T20 World Cup
Runner-up	2026 England
- Source: CricketArchive, 18 May 2026

Matilda Rose Corteen-Coleman (born 23 August 2007) is an English cricketer who currently plays for Surrey and Southern Brave. She plays as a slow left-arm orthodox bowler.

She made her international debut for England in May 2026, in an ODI against New Zealand.

== Early life ==
Corteen-Coleman was born on 23 August 2007 in Canterbury, Kent.

== Domestic career ==
On 21 April 2024, Corteen-Coleman made her debut for Kent, against Middlesex in the ECB Women's County One-Day, taking 1/19 from her 9 overs.

On 5 April 2024, it was announced that Corteen-Coleman had been added to the South East Stars squad on a Pay As You Play contract. She had previously been in the side's Academy squad. She made her debut for the side on 19 May 2024, against Western Storm in the Charlotte Edwards Cup, bowling four overs for 24 runs.

She was drafted by Southern Brave for the 2024 season of The Hundred.

Corteen-Coleman took four wickets in four successive balls as South East Stars beat Northern Diamonds by six wickets in the Charlotte Edwards Cup on 31 May 2024. She had Sterre Kalis caught off the final delivery of her third over and then removed Grace Hall, Katie Levick and Rachel Slater at the start of her last. Overall in 2024, she played 19 matches for South East Stars, across the Rachael Heyhoe Flint Trophy and the Charlotte Edwards Cup, taking 25 wickets with a best bowling of 5/19.

She was named the 2026 Cricket Media Club Women’s Young Cricketer of the Year.

== International career ==
In March 2024, Corteen-Coleman was named in the England Under-19 squad for their tri-series against Sri Lanka and Australia. She played three matches in the series, taking six wickets at an average of 14.66.

In April 2026, Corteen-Coleman was named in the England squad for the 2026 ICC Women's T20 World Cup. She made her ODI debut against New Zealand on 10 May 2026, taking two wickets.
