= Deepak Joon =

Indian cricketer (born 1982)

Personal information
- Born: 26 November 1982 (age 43); Jhajjar, India
- Batting: Left-handed
- Bowling: Slow left-arm orthodox

Domestic team information
- Years: Team
- 2004/05–2006/07: Haryana
- 2014/15: Wellington
- Source: CricInfo, 24 October 2020

Deepak Joon (born 26 November 1982) is an Indian cricketer. He played in twelve first-class matches for Haryana from 2004 to 2007. He then played a further seven first-class matches in New Zealand for Wellington in 2014–15.

Joon was born at Jhajjar in 1982. He played for Haryana for three seasons and then signed with the Jammu & Kashmir cricket team in 2008, but did not play a match for the side. He played club cricket for Wellington Collegians in New Zealand and, in 2014–15, played for the Wellington Firebirds in seven Plunket Shield matches. He has since coached cricket in New Zealand, first for Wellington's men's and women's sides before moving to coach Northern Districts youth players. In 2023 he moved again to coach Central Districts sides. In 2024 he replaced Jacob Oram as the head coach of Central Hinds.
