= Marge Bishop =

New Zealand cricketer

Personal information
- Full name: Marjorie Claire Bishop
- Born: 3 January 1910; Christchurch, New Zealand
- Died: 26 January 1960 (aged 50); Christchurch, New Zealand
- Batting: Right-handed
- Bowling: Right-arm off break
- Role: All-rounder

International information
- National side: New Zealand
- Only Test (cap 1): 16 February 1935 v England

Domestic team information
- Years: Team
- 1939/40: Otago

Career statistics
Competition	WTest	WFC
Matches	1	2
Runs scored	27	85
Batting average	13.50	21.25
100s/50s	0/0	0/0
Top score	27	29
Balls bowled	48	296
Wickets	0	3
Bowling average	–	29.00
5 wickets in innings	0	0
10 wickets in match	0	0
Best bowling	–	2/27
Catches/stumpings	2/–	3/–
- Source: CricketArchive, 29 November 2021

Marjorie Claire Bishop (3 January 1910 – 26 January 1960) was a New Zealand cricketer who played as an all-rounder, batting right-handed and bowling right-arm off break. She appeared in one Test match for New Zealand, their first, in 1935, and was awarded with the first Test cap for the New Zealand women's team. She played domestic cricket for Otago.
