= Esther Blackie =

New Zealand cricketer

Personal information
- Full name: Esther Elizabeth Blackie
- Born: 29 January 1916; Invercargill, New Zealand
- Died: 9 March 1991 (aged 75); Invercargill, New Zealand
- Batting: Right-handed
- Role: Wicket-keeper

International information
- National side: New Zealand (1949)
- Only Test (cap 24): 26 March 1949 v England

Domestic team information
- Years: Team
- 1947/48–1958/59: Otago

Career statistics
Competition	WTest	WFC
Matches	1	21
Runs scored	21	813
Batting average	21.00	23.91
100s/50s	0/0	0/5
Top score	13*	91
Balls bowled	–	856
Wickets	–	16
Bowling average	–	37.62
5 wickets in innings	–	0
10 wickets in match	–	0
Best bowling	–	3/52
Catches/stumpings	3/1	15/6
- Source: CricketArchive, 27 November 2021

Esther Elizabeth Blackie (née Ferguson; 29 January 1916 – 9 March 1991) was a New Zealand cricketer who played as a wicket-keeper and right-handed batter. She played in one Test match for New Zealand in 1949. She played domestic cricket for Otago.
