= Cornwall Park, Hastings =

Public park in Hastings, New Zealand

Cornwall Park
- Papa Rēhia o Mākaramū (Māori)
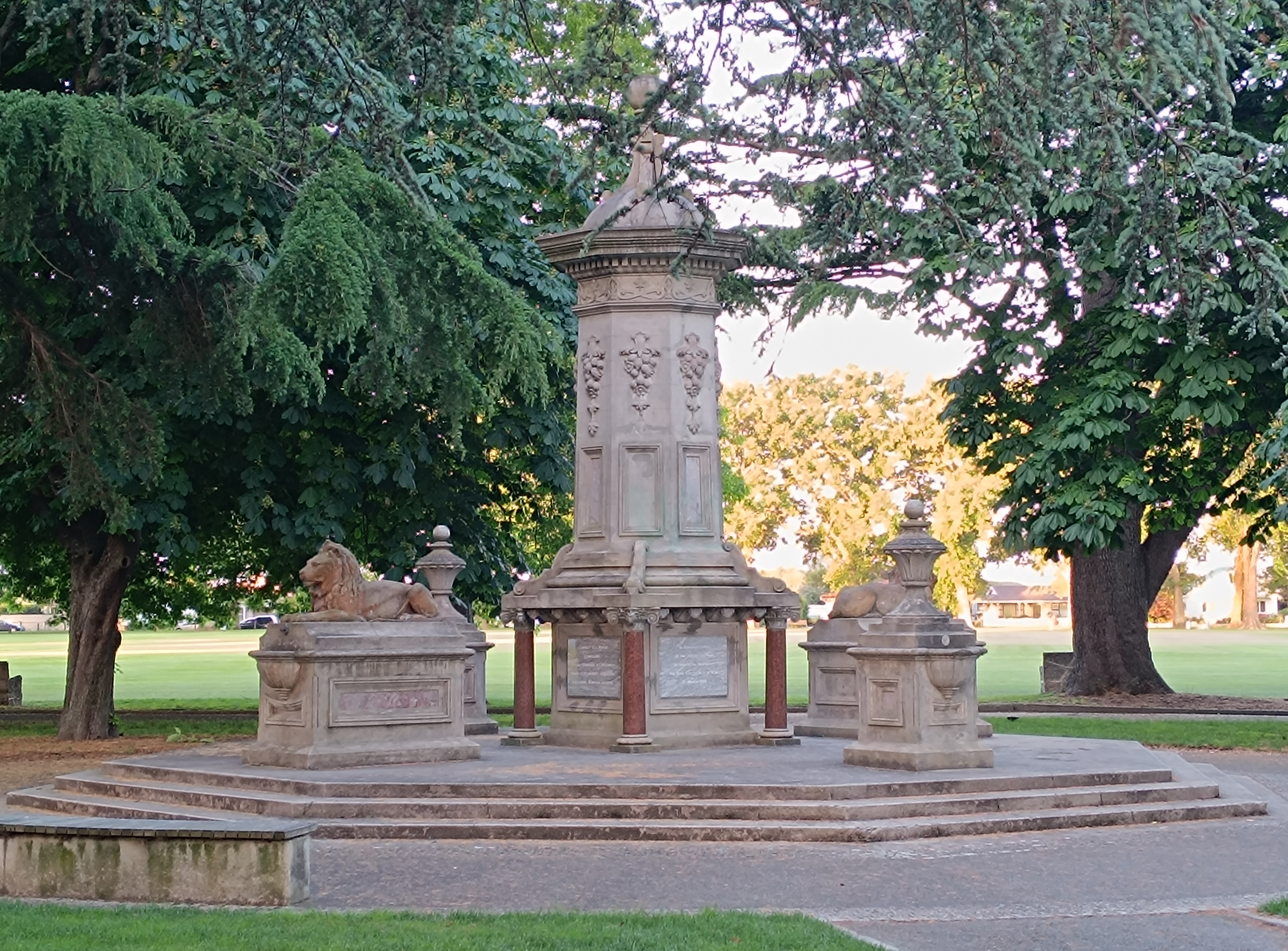
- Coronation drinking fountain in the Park
- Interactive map of Cornwall Park
- Type: Public
- Location: Hastings, New Zealand
- Coordinates: 39°37′55″S 176°50′50″E
- Area: 8.3365 hectares (20.600 acres)
- Opened: November 1905
- Website: hastingsdc.govt.nz

Cornwall Park is a public park in Mahora, a suburb of Hastings, New Zealand, named for King George V.

The land was bought by the council in 1901, and the park opened to the public in November 1905. Over time the facilities of the park were expanded to include areas for sports, various trees were planted around the park, and in the 1920s a major renovation saw much of what the park is today come to fruition. The park has had a connection to royal events since its inception, with celebrations for coronations of monarchs being held there, notably including the installation of the King George V Coronation drinking fountain.

Today the park has many key attractions and facilities including the Osmanthus Garden (a traditional Chinese garden), the John Holt Memorial Display House, the King George V Coronation drinking fountain, and an aviary.

== Name ==
The park is named after King George V, the then Duke of York and Cornwall, who had visited New Zealand the year the park opened.

The Māori language name for the park, Papa Rēhia o Mākaramū, literally translates to "Mākaramū Park". The Mākaramū used to be a major arm of the Ngaruroro River as it flowed through the Heretaunga Plains around Hastings. Today it is a stream that flows through the park.

== Geography ==
The park is located in the suburb of Mahora, bordered by Cornwall Road, Roberts Street, and Tomoana Road, as well as houses on Fitzroy Avenue. Main entrances for the park are on Tomoana Road and Roberts Street.

The north-eastern half of the park is a large field with cricket pitches that is surrounded by large trees. The aviary is located in the eastern-most corner of the park. The Osmanthus Garden is located off of Tomoana Rd in the western-most corner of the park. The John Holt Memorial Display House is located on the Roberts Street-side of the park. The children's playground is located fairly central to the park towards Roberts Street.

=== Water features ===
The Mākaramū River enters the park near the Osmanthus Garden and meanders south-east and then north-east between the playground and Roberts Street, before leaving the park after passing the aviary. A rose garden is located in the south-western point of the park at the corner of Roberts Street and Fitzroy Avenue. A large pond is located off of Tomoana Rd between the Osmanthus Garden and the main entrance.

== History ==
=== Early history ===
Hastings in the late 19th century lacked a major publicly-owned park and this hampered the playing of sports within the city. Even the council itself had to rely on organisations such as the Railway Department and the Jockey Club when in need of space for activities. In 1897, a public meeting was held to discuss ways and means by which the council could acquire such a park. Ideas such as a lease for the use of William Stock's trotting course or a site near the district school were rejected for being overly expensive. What is now Queen's Square was purchased by the council during this time.

In 1898, 21 acres of land for use as a public park were offered by James Nelson Williams under the conditions that it was ploughed and that areas be set aside for the planting of trees that he would supervise. The reserve was acquired in 1901 and would be the start of what Cornwall Park is today. At the time the council lacked major funds so the park was left for grazing, until a movement lobbied the council to vote on spending money to establish recreational grounds. NZ£210 was authorised to be spent towards this. A road was built through the park and then a cycling and athletic club was established which held the first sports event on the fields when the park opened in November 1905. Apart from this area set out for recreation, much of the park was undeveloped grazing land for several years.

Following the death of King Edward VII, the "patriotic" community of Hastings mourned but soon conversations moved to a coronation memorial. Eight ideas were proposed but the idea for a drinking fountain at Cornwall Park put forth by local Victor Ernest Larcomb was chosen. £212 17s was accepted for the construction of the fountain from E. and W. Platt from Wellington. The "gigantic" columns came from afar as Aberdeen, Scotland and the marble slabs came from Australia. The fountain featured lion statues modelled after a real lion who lived in the Newtown zoo.

In the late 1920s, Christchurch landscape architect A. W. Buxton land out plans for the improvement of Cornwall Park. From this plan the park gained its entrance gates, its flower beds, some duck ponds, its aviary, its tea kiosk, a miniature zoo, and a children's playground. The park's zoo had monkeys, peacocks, pheasants and mandarin ducks. A bandstand was built in the park in the 1920s but was later torn down and replaced with artesian walls.

The late 1930s saw the First Labour Government's public works initiatives, which benefited the park greatly through the use of formerly unemployed labourers to build seats and bridges under architect E. W. Garnett. The current duck ponds were built where the old tennis courts were during this period.

=== 21st century ===
In 2023, to celebrate Hastings' 150 year anniversary, trees were planted and a commemorative plaque was installed. A time capsule of letters written by school children was buried.

Also in 2023, a tree was planted in the park to commemorate the coronation of King Charles III. Although a "royal oak" tree is traditional, the native kahikatea tree was chosen instead.

== Attractions and facilities ==
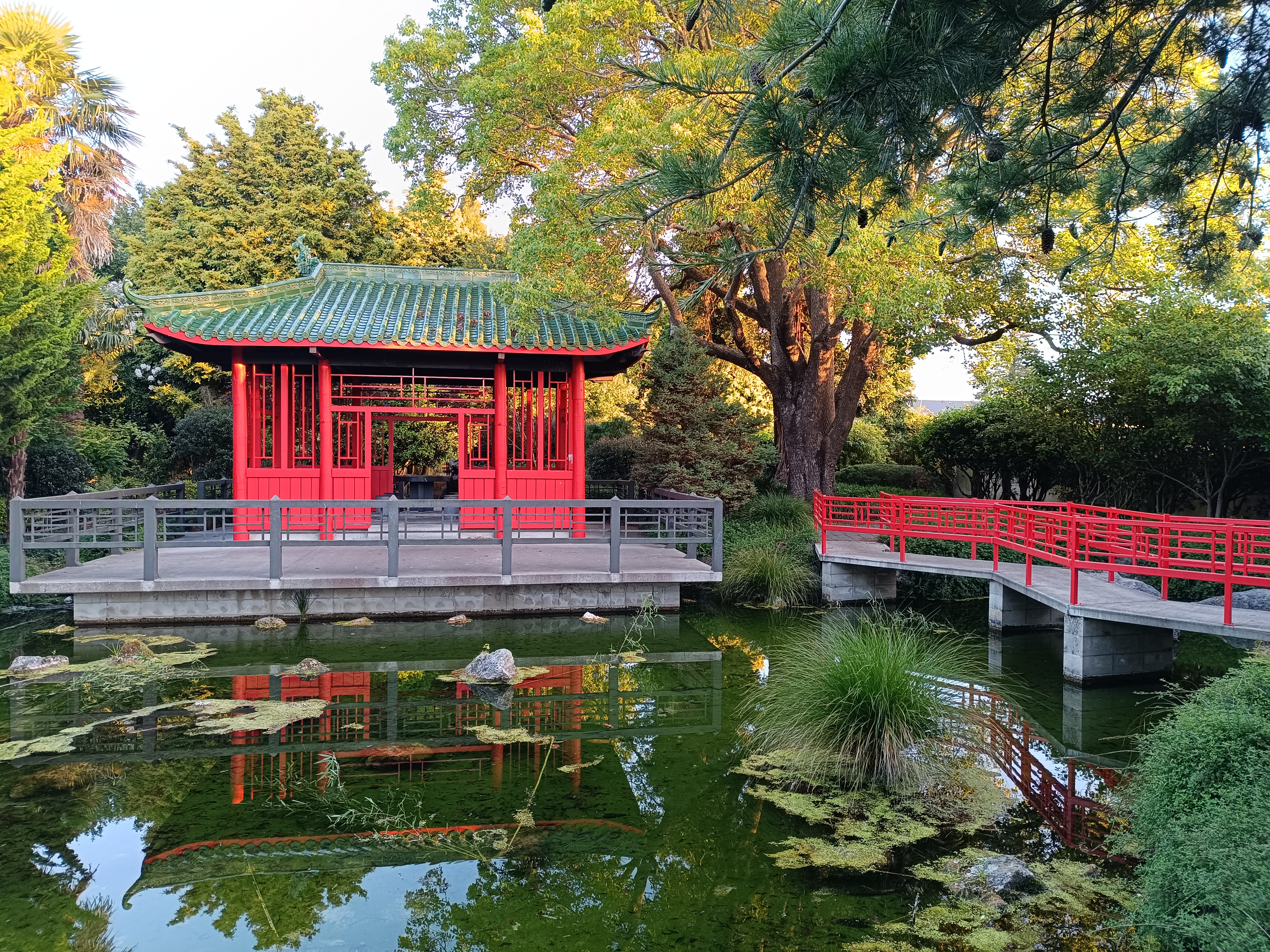
Osmanthus Garden

=== Osmanthus Garden ===
The Osmanthus Garden is a traditional Chinese garden located in the park. Established in 1996, the garden commemorates the 15 year anniversary of sister-city status between Hastings and Guilin, China. The garden combines New Zealand and Chinese styles and plants, with bamboo, camellia, and the eponymous osmanthus. The garden also has ponds and a "friendship bridge". The garden was designed by Guilin landscape designer Zhao Jian.

=== John Holt Memorial Display House ===
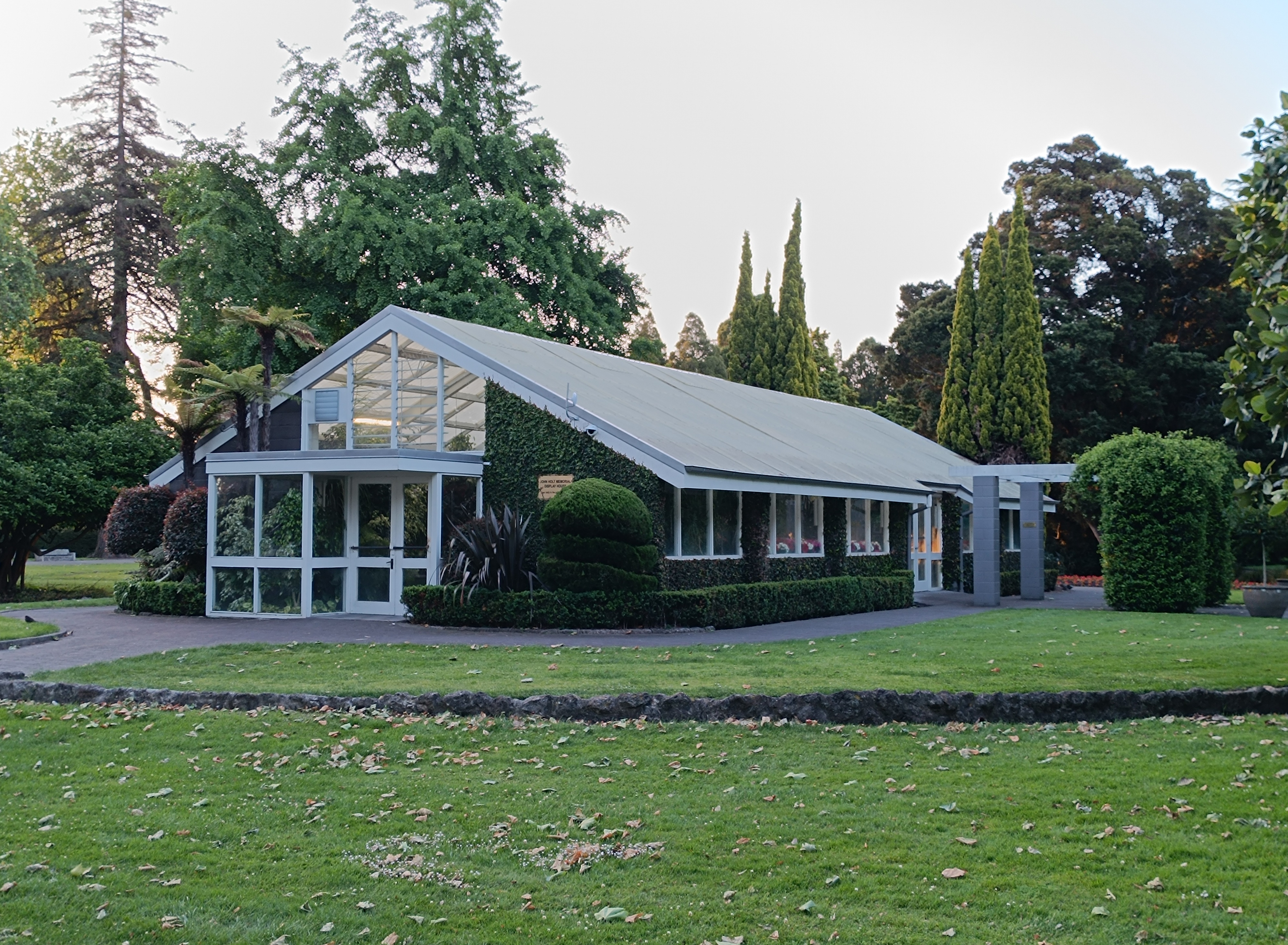
John Holt Memorial Display House

The John Holt Memorial Display House is a heated glasshouse in the park. It was opened in March 1966 after it was donated by Mrs R. V. Burr, the daughter of the eponymous John Holt. Hastings Mayor R. V. Giorgi was present. The glasshouse contains thousands of potted plants and flowers. The glasshouse was designed by local architect D. Scott.

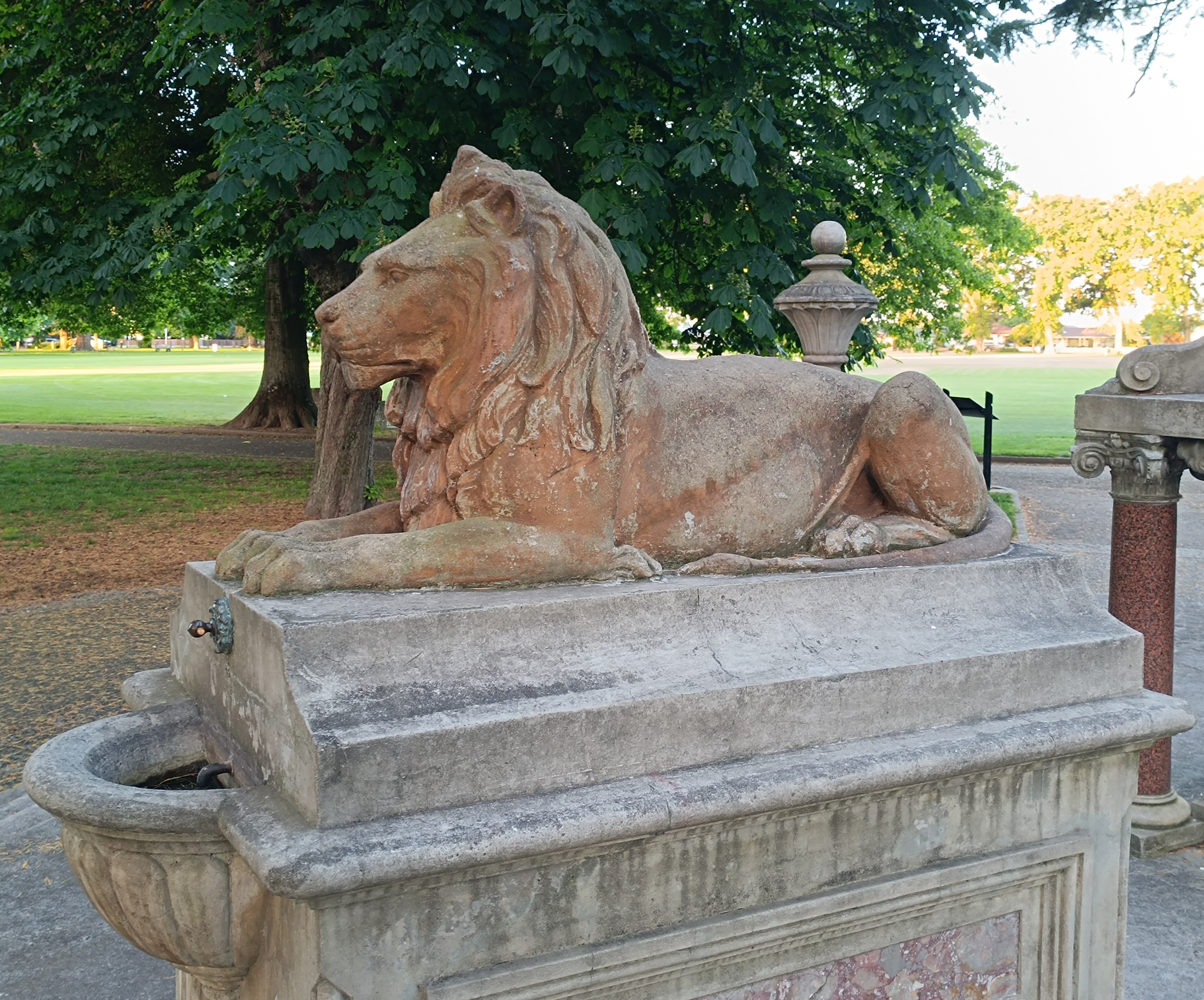
Lion at Coronation drinking fountain

=== Coronation drinking fountain ===
The King George V Coronation drinking fountain is on the New Zealand Heritage List as a Historic Place Category 2. The fountain was erected in 1911. The design of the fountain consists of a tall column at the centre with dedication plaques on each side, surrounded by four pedestals. Each pedestal has a drinking spout and bowl, with opposing pedestals having pairs of lions and vases, respectively. The base of the fountain is an concrete octagonal platform.

=== Tea kiosk ===
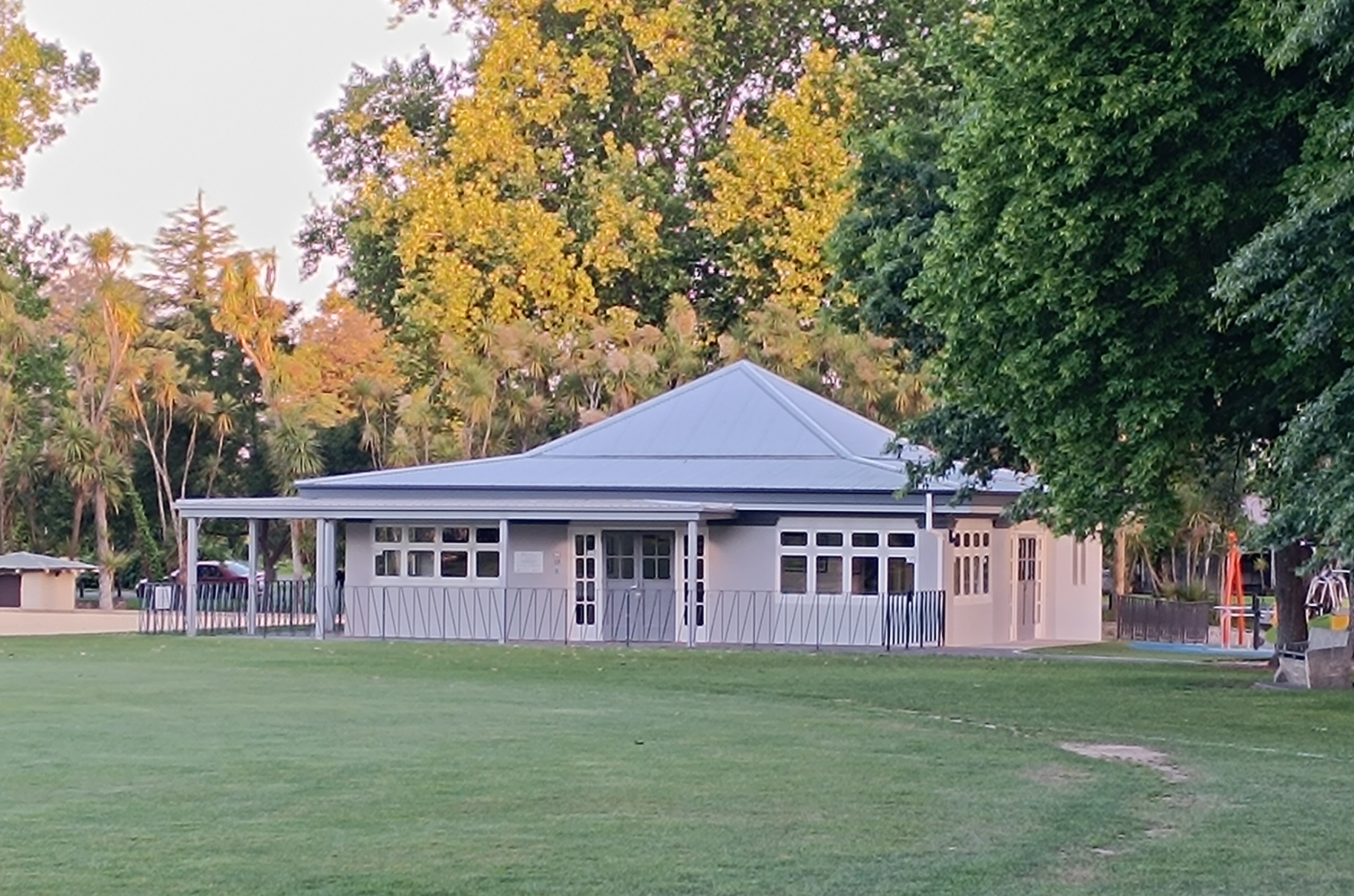
Tea Kiosk

A tea kiosk in "modern renaissance style" was constructed in November 1928, designed by local architect Harold Davies. Funds were set aside by council to the tune of £150 from the Municipal Theatre account. The total cost ended up near £1225. The rooftop of the building was able to be used as a band stand. The first tenant of the building was one Mrs A. Kirby. According to Kirby the building "was not even cracked by the quake", referring to how it faired in the 1931 Hawke's Bay earthquake. A fire closed the tea rooms in 1957. The Hawke's Bay Playcentre Association leased the building from 1970, removing the bandstand and adding on a playground.

In 2023, the building was restored and renamed Te Mākaramū / The Meeting Room.

=== Aviary ===
The park hosts a popular aviary with around 100 birds, consisting mainly of cockatiels, lorikeets, and budgerigars. Fifteen red-eared slider turtles live in the aviary alongside the birds.

In early 2023 the council started upgrading the aviary after community consultation. The upgrades consisted of more space for the birds and more plants for them to perch on and concrete and steel netting were replaced. A mural by local artist Brandon Blair was added and new signage was installed. The upgrades were done under the recommendation of the Wildlife Trust and Massey University. The upgrades also involved fixing damage from Cyclone Gabrielle which caused a tree branch to fall onto the aviary. The upgrades to the aviary were finished in July 2023.

Cockatoos that were housed there, named "Mate" and "Stevie Nicks", were moved during the upgrades. It has been decided they won't be moved back in due to health concerns.

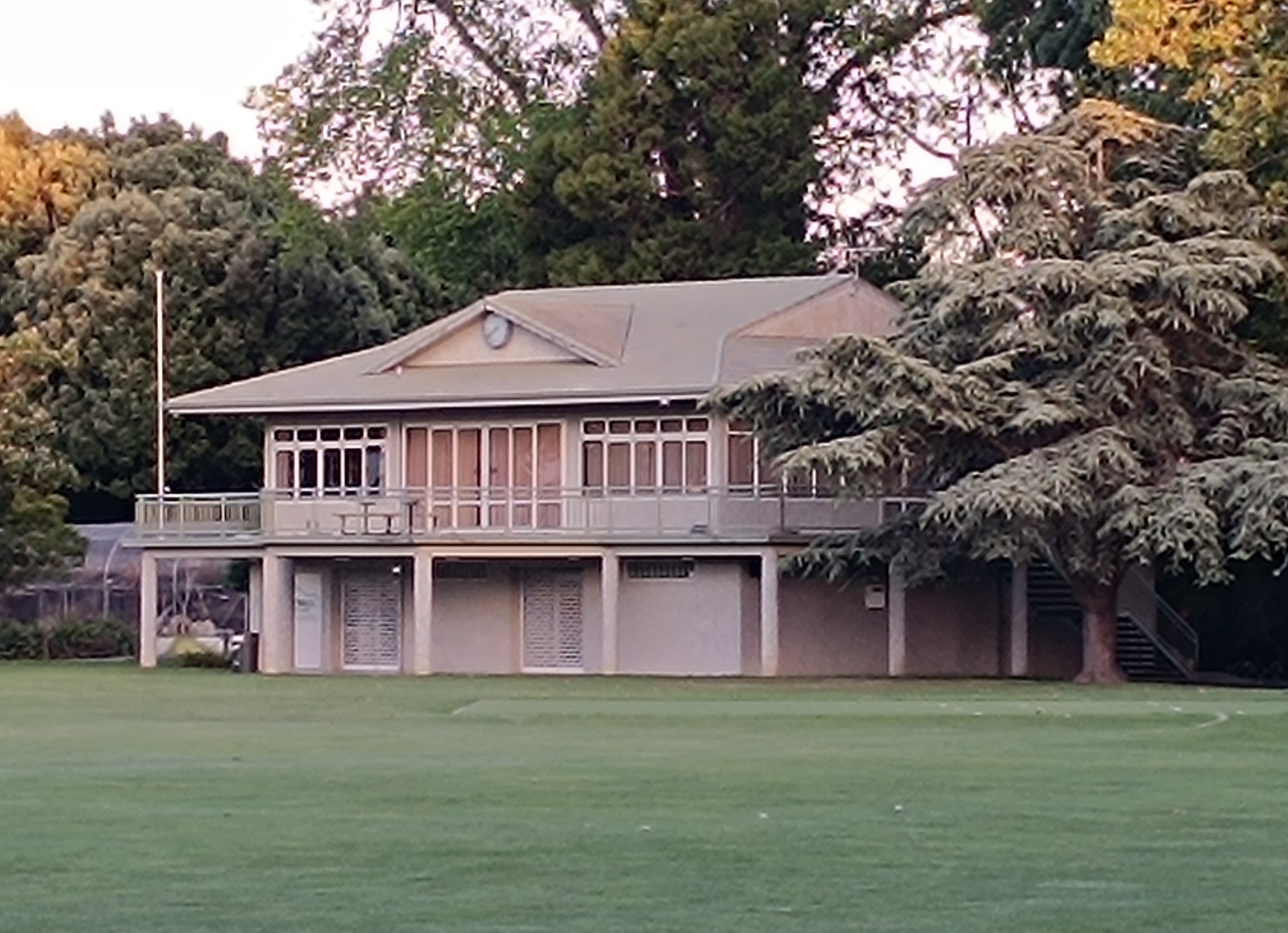
Cornwall Cricket Club pavilion

=== Playground ===
The first children's playground in the park was built around 1924. The playground was upgraded in 2019.

=== Cricket ===
Cricket was first played in the park in 1906. In the 1930s, the park was flattened and the grass cared to in order to improve conditions for cricket, with room for four cricket pitches in summer and two hockey fields in winter. The first cricket pavilion was built in 1935, with the current one built in 1996. The Cornwall Cricket Club is based in the pavilion.

== Maintenance ==
Maintenance and development of the park is currently handled by the Hastings District Council and governed through the Cornwall Park Reserve Management Plan.
