= Emily Travers =

New Zealand cricketer (born 1978)

Personal information
- Full name: Emily Anne Travers
- Born: 29 July 1978 (age 48); Hunterville, New Zealand
- Batting: Right-handed
- Role: Wicket-keeper

International information
- National side: New Zealand (2000)
- ODI debut (cap 84): 22 November 2000 v England
- Last ODI: 6 December 2000 v Netherlands

Domestic team information
- Years: Team
- 1997/98–2000/01: Central Districts
- 2001/02: Canterbury

Career statistics
Competition	WODI	WLA
Matches	3	56
Runs scored	–	184
Batting average	–	8.36
100s/50s	–	0/0
Top score	–	29
Catches/stumpings	0/0	38/26
- Source: CricketArchive, 22 April 2021

Emily Anne Travers (born 29 July 1978) is a New Zealand former cricketer who played as a wicket-keeper. She appeared in 3 One Day Internationals for New Zealand in 2000, including two matches at the 2000 World Cup. She played domestic cricket for Central Districts and Canterbury.

After retiring from cricket, she continued to develop her successful career in commercial events and sport administration working for organisations such as IAG New Zealand, Auckland Rugby/Blues, The Radio Network and NZME. While working full time, she was also one of the first female members of the Sky TV domestic cricket commentary team and went on to present Sky TV's "Cricket Company", as well as presenting for the TAB within Sky TV's cricket, netball, tennis and darts coverage.
