= Abby Burrows =

New Zealand cricketer (born 1977)

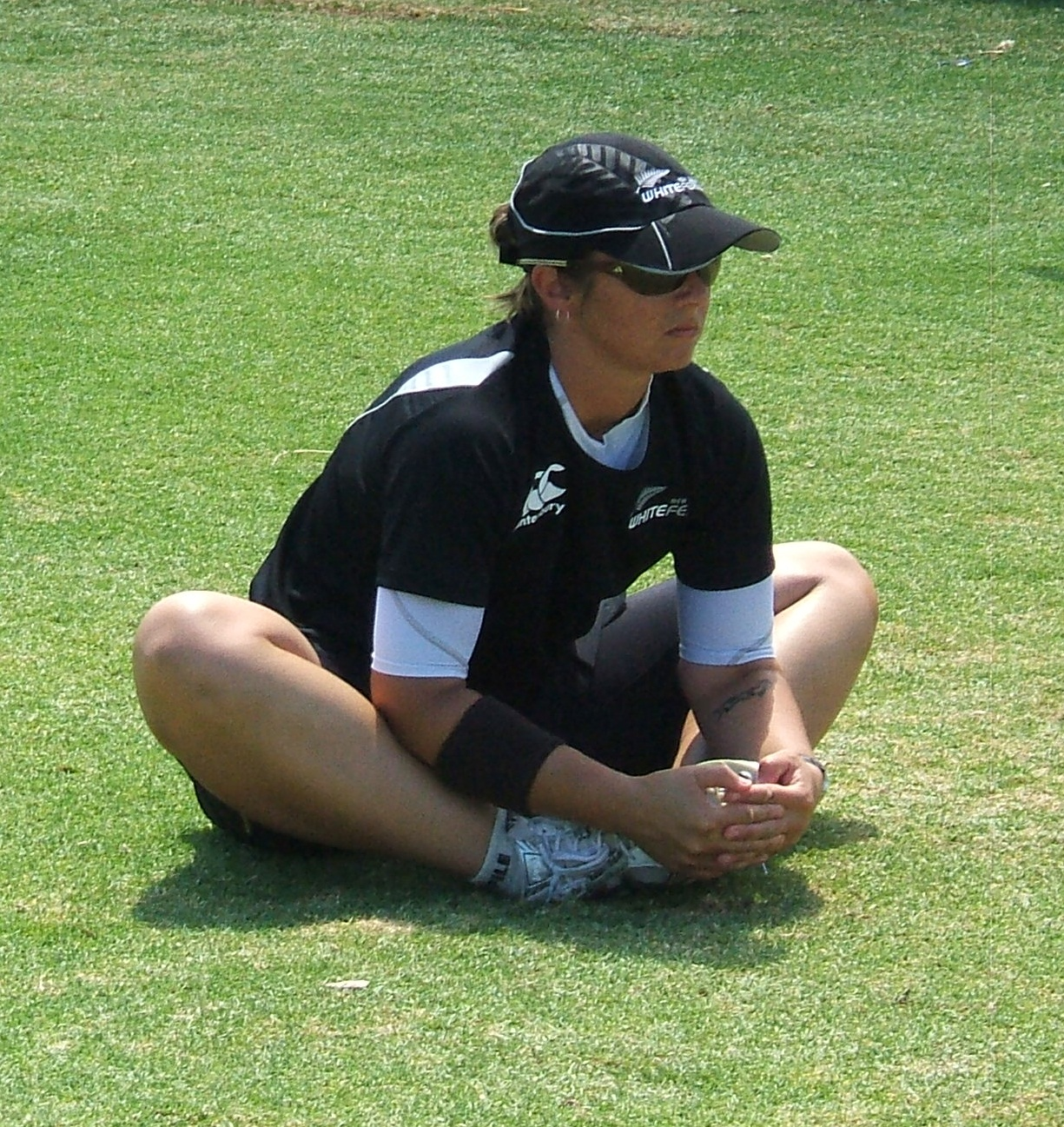

Personal information
- Full name: Abby Kirstyn Burrows
- Born: 29 January 1977 (age 49); Whakatāne, Bay of Plenty, New Zealand
- Batting: Left-handed
- Bowling: Right-arm medium
- Role: Bowler

International information
- National side: New Zealand (2009–2010)
- ODI debut (cap 111): 1 February 2009 v Australia
- Last ODI: 6 March 2010 v Australia

Domestic team information
- Years: Team
- 1997/98–2014/15: Central Districts

Career statistics
Competition	WODI	WLA	WT20
Matches	9	122	33
Runs scored	5	285	13
Batting average	–	8.14	4.33
100s/50s	0/0	0/0	0/0
Top score	3*	25	5*
Balls bowled	337	5,318	628
Wickets	7	120	27
Bowling average	38.14	27.13	21.33
5 wickets in innings	0	1	0
10 wickets in match	0	0	0
Best bowling	3/27	5/39	3/3
Catches/stumpings	2/–	20/–	3/–
- Source: CricketArchive, 15 April 2021

Abby Kirstyn Burrows (born 29 January 1977) is a New Zealand former cricketer who played as a right-arm medium bowler. She appeared in 9 One Day Internationals for New Zealand between 2009 and 2010. She played domestic cricket for Central Districts.
