= Erin McDonald =

New Zealand cricketer (born 1980)

Personal information
- Full name: Erin Teresa McDonald
- Born: 25 November 1980 (age 45); Lower Hutt, New Zealand
- Batting: Right-handed
- Bowling: Slow left-arm orthodox
- Role: Bowler

International information
- National side: New Zealand (2000)
- ODI debut (cap 83): 21 November 2000 v England
- Last ODI: 6 December 2000 v Netherlands

Domestic team information
- Years: Team
- 1997/98–2002/03: Central Districts
- 2003/04: Wellington

Career statistics
Competition	WODI	WFC	WLA
Matches	3	1	72
Runs scored	–	43	400
Batting average	–	21.50	11.76
100s/50s	–	0/0	0/0
Top score	–	34	34
Balls bowled	144	108	3,662
Wickets	5	1	74
Bowling average	10.00	44.00	27.12
5 wickets in innings	0	0	0
10 wickets in match	0	0	0
Best bowling	2/17	1/20	4/30
Catches/stumpings	1/–	1/–	11/–
- Source: CricketArchive, 22 April 2021

Erin Teresa McDonald (born 25 November 1980) is a New Zealand former cricketer who played as a slow left-arm orthodox bowler. She appeared in three Women's One Day International matches for New Zealand in 2000, and was part of New Zealand's squad for the 2000 Women's Cricket World Cup. Following her playing career, McDonald worked for Aurecon in Melbourne, Australia, and worked on the design of an underground rail line.
