= Kate Pulford =

New Zealand cricketer (born 1980)

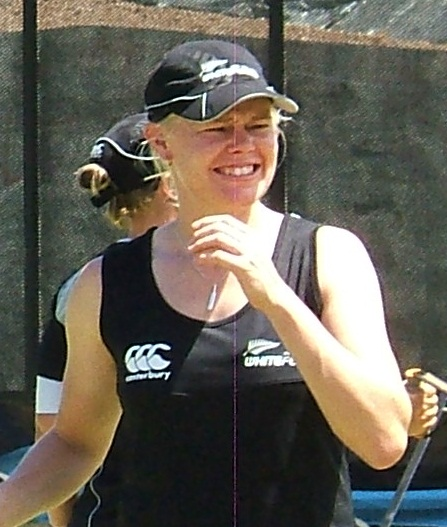

Personal information
- Full name: Katherine Louise Pulford
- Born: 27 August 1980 (age 46); Nelson, New Zealand
- Batting: Right-handed
- Bowling: Right-arm medium
- Role: All-rounder

International information
- National side: New Zealand (1999–2010)
- Only Test (cap 118): 27 November 2003 v India
- ODI debut (cap 74): 13 February 1999 v South Africa
- Last ODI: 7 March 2010 v Australia
- T20I debut (cap 26): 15 February 2009 v Australia
- Last T20I: 28 February 2010 v Australia

Domestic team information
- Years: Team
- 1996/97–2004/05: Central Districts
- 2006/07–2009/10: Northern Districts
- 2010/11: Western Australia
- 2012/13–2014/15: Australian Capital Territory

Career statistics
Competition	WTest	WODI	WT20I	WLA
Matches	1	46	12	171
Runs scored	0	743	66	3,655
Batting average	0.00	18.57	11.00	26.10
100s/50s	0/0	0/3	0/0	3/19
Top score	0	95	29	153*
Balls bowled	78	1,197	234	6,035
Wickets	2	30	11	150
Bowling average	7.50	26.06	16.90	26.34
5 wickets in innings	0	0	0	0
10 wickets in match	0	0	0	0
Best bowling	2/15	4/5	2/21	4/5
Catches/stumpings	1/–	10/–	1/–	39/–
- Source: CricketArchive, 19 April 2021

Katherine Louise Pulford (born 27 August 1980) is a New Zealand former cricketer who played as an all-rounder, bowling right-arm medium and batting right-handed. She appeared in 1 Test match, 46 One Day Internationals and 12 Twenty20 Internationals for New Zealand between 1999 and 2010. Her performances at the 2009 Women's Cricket World Cup saw her named in the ICC's team of the tournament. She played domestic cricket for Central Districts, Northern Districts, Western Australia and Australian Capital Territory.
