= Central Hinds =

Personnel
- Captain: Hannah Rowe
- Coach: Deepak Joon

Team information
- Colours: Green and gold
- Founded: First recorded match: 1979
- Home ground: Pukekura Park, New Plymouth; Saxton Oval, Nelson; Fitzherbert Park, Palmerston North; McLean Park, Napier

History
- First-class debut: Canterbury in 1979 at Porritt Park, Christchurch
- HBJS wins: 3
- SS wins: 1
- Official website: Central Hinds

The Central Hinds are the women's representative cricket team of the Central Districts Cricket Association, based in central New Zealand (excluding Wellington). The Major Association team is the only female team to draw players from both the main islands of New Zealand. They play their home games at Pukekura Park, New Plymouth, Fitzherbert Park, Palmerston North, Saxton Oval, Nelson and McLean Park, Napier. They compete in the Hallyburton Johnstone Shield one-day competition and the Women's Super Smash Twenty20 competition and were originally known as Central Districts Women.

== History ==
Central Districts Cricket Association comprises eight District Associations: Hawke's Bay, Horowhenua-Kapiti, Manawatu, Taranaki, Wairarapa and Whanganui in the North Island, and Marlborough and Nelson in the South Island.

Central Districts first joined the national Hallyburton Johnstone Shield in the 1979–80 season, finishing fourth with one win and three draws. In 1982–83, they finished second for the first time, behind Canterbury, who dominated the period.

The Central Hinds won their first title in 2005–06 (when the national women's one-day competition was named the State League), finishing second in the group stage before beating Canterbury in the final - helped by three wickets from Zara McWilliams and 55* from Sara McGlashan. They were the runner-up in 2007–08 before winning their second one-day title in 2009–10, with the final rained off and lifting the trophy as they had topped the group stage. They also won their only Super Smash title the same season, beating Auckland in the final by eight wickets.

The Central Hinds won their third one-day title in 2018–19, topping the group stage before beating the Auckland Hearts in a home final at Pukekura Park. Central Hinds batter Natalie Dodd was the leading run-scorer in the competition, with 652 runs.

Dodd and then-captain Anlo van Deventer set a New Zealand women's List A partnership record (all wickets) of 328 during the Hallyburton Johnstone Shield, for the second wicket against the Otago Sparks at Fitzherbert Park on 3 March 2019. In December 2019, Dodd and Jess Watkin set a national first-wicket record in the Hallyburton Johnstone Shield with a partnership of 216 at Karori Park, Wellington.

The side was runner-up in the 2023–24 Super Smash, making the final for the first time since 2016. They lost to Wellington by one run (DLS) on the final ball of the match.

== Grounds ==
The team's first primary home ground was Manawaroa Park, Palmerston North, with some matches played at Ongley Park in the same city.

In the 1990s, the side began playing at Victoria Park, Whanganui, as well as Fitzherbert Park in Palmerston North. In 1998, the team began playing in Napier, especially at Nelson Park, but also later at McLean Park. From the 2000s, their primary grounds were Pukekura Park, New Plymouth and Fitzherbert Park, along with stints at grounds such as Queen Elizabeth Park and Cornwall Park, Hastings.

Since 2020–21, the Central Hinds have primarily used Pukekura Park, McLean Park, Fitzherbert Park and (from 2021–22) Saxton Oval, Nelson, and play both their home and away Super Smash matches as doubleheaders with the Central Stags.

== 2026/27 squad ==
- Number denotes the player's squad number, as worn on the back of their shirt.
- ‡ denotes players with international caps.

No.	Name	Nationality	Birth date	Batting style	Bowling style	Notes
Batters
13	Yasmeen Kareem	New Zealand	8 September 1999 (age 26)	Left-handed	Right-arm medium	CDCA contract
21	Emma McLeod ‡	New Zealand	28 March 2006 (age 20)	Right-handed	Right-arm off break	CDCA contract
30	Cate Pedersen	New Zealand	31 July 2002 (age 24)	Right-handed	Right-arm medium	CDCA contract
88	Kerry-Anne Tomlinson ‡	New Zealand	19 January 1990 (age 36)	Right-handed	Right-arm medium	CDCA contract
5	Abby Treder	New Zealand	28 January 2006 (age 20)	Right-handed	Right-arm medium	CDCA contract
All-rounders
23	Georgia Atkinson	New Zealand	23 April 2000 (age 26)	Right-handed	Right-arm leg break	CDCA contract
26	Flora Devonshire ‡	New Zealand	13 February 2003 (age 23)	Left-handed	Left-arm off break	NZC contract
25	Ashtuti Kumar	New Zealand	19 July 2003 (age 23)	Right-handed	Right-arm off break	CDCA contract
74	Hannah Rowe ‡	New Zealand	3 October 1996 (age 29)	Right-handed	Right-arm medium	NZC contract
Wicket-keepers
19	Kate Gaging	New Zealand	19 July 2001 (age 25)	Right-handed	—	CDCA contract
31	Jessie Hollard	New Zealand	3 November 2003 (age 22)	Right-handed	—	CDCA contract
Bowlers
34	Aniela Apperley	New Zealand	12 September 2004 (age 21)	Right-handed	Right-arm medium	CDCA contract
37	Elizabeth Cohr	New Zealand	17 October 2002 (age 23)	Right-handed	Right-arm off break	CDCA contract
22	Grace Foreman	New Zealand	4 March 2005 (age 21)	Right-handed	Right-arm medium	CDCA contract
7	Rosemary Mair ‡	New Zealand	7 November 1998 (age 27)	Right-handed	Right-arm medium	NZC contract
10	Jess Ogden	New Zealand	7 January 2002 (age 24)	Right-handed	Right-arm medium	CDCA contract

=== Notable players ===
Players who have played for Central Districts and played internationally are listed below, in order of first international appearance (given in brackets):

- (New Zealand) Viv Sexton (1978)
- (New Zealand) Linda Fraser (1982)
- (New Zealand) Di Caird (1984)
- (New Zealand) Rose Signal (1984)
- (New Zealand) Liz Signal (1984)
- (New Zealand) Jackie Clark (1984)
- (New Zealand) Penny Kinsella (1988)
- (New Zealand) Trudy Anderson (1993)
- (New Zealand) Karen Musson (1993)
- (New Zealand) Delwyn Brownlee (1995)
- (England) Clare Connor (1995)
- (New Zealand) Helen Daly (1996)
- (New Zealand) Rebecca Rolls (1997)
- (New Zealand) Rachel Pullar (1997)
- (New Zealand) Kate Pulford (1999)
- (New Zealand) Donna Trow (1999)
- (England) Hannah Lloyd (1999)
- (New Zealand) Paula Gruber (2000)
- (New Zealand) Erin McDonald (2000)
- (New Zealand) Emily Travers (2000)
- (New Zealand) Aimee Watkins (2002)
- (New Zealand) Sara McGlashan (2003)
- (Ireland) Eimear Richardson (2005)
- (New Zealand) Rachel Priest (2007)
- (New Zealand) Rachel Candy (2007)
- (New Zealand) Abby Burrows (2009)
- (New Zealand) Natalie Dodd (2010)
- (New Zealand) Kate Ebrahim (2010)
- (New Zealand) Liz Perry (2010)
- (Netherlands) Esther Lanser (2010)
- (Netherlands) Kerry-Anne Tomlinson (2011)
- (New Zealand) Thamsyn Newton (2015)
- (New Zealand) Hannah Rowe (2015)
- (New Zealand) Jess Watkin (2018)
- (England) Bryony Smith (2018)
- (Scotland) Priyanaz Chatterji (2018)
- (New Zealand) Rosemary Mair (2019)
- (New Zealand) Rebecca Burns (2022)
- (New Zealand) Mikaela Greig (2024)
- (England) Hollie Armitage (2024)
- (New Zealand) Emma McLeod (2025)
- (New Zealand) Flora Devonshire (2025)

Players who have played for Central Districts and played internationally in sports other than cricket or indoor cricket are listed below:

- (New Zealand) Kendra Cocksedge - rugby union
- (New Zealand) Liz Perry - field hockey double international
- (New Zealand) Rebecca Rolls - association football double international

== Honours ==
- Hallyburton Johnstone Shield:
  - Winners (3): 2005–06, 2009–10, 2018–19
- Women's Super Smash:
  - Winners (1): 2009–10

== See also ==
- Central Districts cricket team
