= Otago Sparks =

Personnel
- Captain: Suzie Bates
- Coach: Craig Cumming

Team information
- Colours: OV
- Founded: First recorded match: 1932
- Home ground: University Oval, Dunedin
- Secondary home ground(s): Whitestone Contracting Stadium, Oamaru; Queenstown Events Centre, Queenstown

History
- First-class debut: Wellington in 1940 at Basin Reserve, Wellington
- HBJS wins: 4
- SS wins: 1
- Official website: Otago Cricket

The Otago Sparks is the women's cricket representative team for the New Zealand region of Otago and the surrounding area. They play their home games at University Oval, Dunedin. They compete in the Hallyburton Johnstone Shield one-day competition and the Women's Super Smash Twenty20 competition.

== History ==
Otago made their first appearance in the Hallyburton Johnstone Shield in 1939–40, where they lost to Wellington. The following period in the one-day competition was dominated by Auckland and Wellington, however, and Otago did not record a second-place finish until 1957–58. They finished second again in 1960–61 before finally winning their first title in 1962–63, winning two matches and drawing one. In 1967–68, Otago competed in the Australian Women's Cricket Championships, finishing fourth out of five.

Otago did not play in major competition between 1983–84 and 1997–98. Some Otago players instead played for Southern Districts, which competed between 1983–84 and 1987–88. They returned for the 1998–99 season, but finished bottom of the one-day competition points table.

Otago won their second one-day competition in 2013–14, finishing second in the group stage before beating Auckland in the final, helped by 99 from captain Suzie Bates and winning by 3 wickets off the penultimate delivery. They won their third one-day competition in 2021–22, finishing second in the group stage to qualify for the final, before beating group winners Wellington in the final by 138 runs. They won their fourth one-day competition in 2023–24, this time topping the group stage and defeating Wellington in the final.

Otago have also competed in the Twenty20 Super Smash since its inception in 2007–08, finishing second in 2014–15 before winning the title in 2016–17. They finished second in the group stage in 2016–17, but beat group winners Canterbury in the final, with Suzie Bates scoring 74 and Kate Heffernan taking 4/21. Otago bowler Leigh Kasperek was the leading wicket-taker in the tournament, with 8 wickets.

== Grounds ==
Otago played their first home Hallyburton Johnstone Shield match at University Oval, Dunedin, and the ground has remained the side's primary home ground throughout their history. They also used Logan Park and Carisbrook, also in Dunedin, until the early 2000s.

From 2005, the side began using Molyneux Park, Alexandra and in 2007 Queens Park, Invercargill. In the 2017–18 season, they also began using Whitestone Contracting Stadium, Oamaru. In 2021–22, the side primarily used University Oval, as well as playing two games at Whitestone Contracting Stadium and three, for the first time, at Queenstown Events Centre. In 2022–23, the side used University Oval and Queenstown Events Centre for their home matches.

== Players ==
=== Current squad ===
Based on squad announced for the 2023–24 season. Players in bold have international caps.

No.	Name	Nationality	Birth date	Batting style	Bowling style	Notes
Batters
7	Caitlin Blakely	New Zealand	7 January 1996 (age 29)	Right-handed	Right-arm medium	
All-rounders
17	**Hayley Jensen**	New Zealand	7 October 1992 (age 32)	Right-handed	Right-arm medium	
18	Paige Loggenberg	New Zealand	15 October 2003 (age 21)	Right-handed	Right-arm medium	
23	**Suzie Bates**	New Zealand	16 September 1987 (age 37)	Right-handed	Right-arm medium	Vice Captain
33	Saffron Wilson	New Zealand	5 December 2001 (age 23)	Right-handed	Right-arm medium	
36	Gemma Adams	New Zealand	15 February 2002 (age 23)	Right-handed	Right-arm medium	
49	**Felicity Robertson**	New Zealand	22 June 1994 (age 30)	Right-handed	Right-arm medium	Captain
Wicket-keepers
11	Olivia Gain	New Zealand	2 January 2002 (age 23)	Right-handed	—	
21	**Bella James**	New Zealand	27 January 1999 (age 26)	Right-handed	—	
29	**Polly Inglis**	New Zealand	31 May 1996 (age 28)	Right-handed	—	
Bowlers
5	Louisa Kotkamp	New Zealand	16 September 2005 (age 19)	Right-handed	Right-arm medium	
10	Molly Loe	New Zealand	25 June 2003 (age 21)	Right-handed	Right-arm medium	
14	Sophie Oldershaw	New Zealand	20 May 1998 (age 26)	Right-handed	Right-arm leg break	
23	Chloe Deerness	New Zealand	23 August 2005 (age 19)	Right-handed	Right-arm off break	
24	**Eden Carson**	New Zealand	8 August 2001 (age 23)	Right-handed	Right-arm off break	
30	Emma Black	New Zealand	8 August 2001 (age 23)	Right-handed	Right-arm medium	
46	Poppy-Jay Watkins	England	24 January 2004 (age 21)	Right-handed	Left-arm medium	

=== Notable players ===
Players who have played for Otago and played internationally are listed below, in order of first international appearance (given in brackets):

- (New Zealand) Marge Bishop (1935)
- (New Zealand) Merle Hollis (1935)
- (New Zealand) Helen Allan (1935)
- (New Zealand) Esther Blackie (1949)
- (New Zealand) Eris Paton (1954)
- (New Zealand) Betty Sinclair (1954)
- (New Zealand) Mary Webb (1957)
- (New Zealand) Daphne Robinson (1961)
- (New Zealand) Trish McKelvey (1966)
- (New Zealand) Louise Clough (1969)
- (New Zealand) Carol Marett (1972)
- (New Zealand) Jan Hall (1982)
- (England) Gillian McConway (1982)
- (New Zealand) Shona Gilchrist (1984)
- (New Zealand) Catherine Campbell (1988)
- (England) Clare Taylor (1988)
- (Netherlands) Pauline te Beest (1990)
- (New Zealand) Jill Saulbrey (1995)
- (New Zealand) Rachel Pullar (1997)
- (New Zealand) Paula Flannery (2000)
- (Netherlands) (New Zealand) Rowan Milburn (2000) (Note: Milburn represented both the Netherlands and New Zealand in international cricket.)
- (New Zealand) Amanda Green (2003)
- (Australia) Alex Blackwell (2003)
- (New Zealand) Katey Martin (2003)
- (New Zealand) Beth McNeill (2004)
- (New Zealand) Suzie Bates (2006)
- (New Zealand) Sarah Tsukigawa (2006)
- (England) Lynsey Askew (2006)
- (England) Laura Marsh (2006)
- (New Zealand) Emma Campbell (2010)
- (New Zealand) Morna Nielsen (2010)
- (New Zealand) Kate Ebrahim (2010)
- (England) Beth Langston (2013)
- (Australia) Nicole Bolton (2014)
- (New Zealand) Hayley Jensen (2014)
- (New Zealand) Felicity Leydon-Davis (2014)
- (New Zealand) Leigh Kasperek (2015)
- (Australia) Amanda-Jade Wellington (2016)
- (New Zealand) Kate Heffernan (2018)
- (England) Alice Davidson-Richards (2018)
- (England) Kirstie Gordon (2018)
- (England) Linsey Smith (2018)
- (Hong Kong) Marina Lamplough (2019)
- (United States) Shebani Bhaskar (2019)
- (Australia) Hannah Darlington (2021)
- (Hong Kong) Natasha Miles (2021)
- (New Zealand) Eden Carson (2022)
- (New Zealand) Bella James (2024)
- (New Zealand) Polly Inglis (2025)

== Coaching staff ==
- Head Coach: Craig Cumming

== Honours ==
- Hallyburton Johnstone Shield:
  - Winners (4): 1962–63, 2013–14, 2021–22, 2023–24
- Women's Super Smash:
  - Winners (1): 2016–17

== See also ==
- Otago cricket team
