= Katie Perkins =

New Zealand cricketer (born 1988)

Personal information
- Full name: Katie Teresa Perkins
- Born: 7 July 1988 (age 38); Auckland, New Zealand
- Batting: Right-handed
- Bowling: Right-arm medium
- Role: Batter

International information
- National side: New Zealand (2012–2020)
- ODI debut (cap 124): 25 January 2012 v Australia
- Last ODI: 7 October 2020 v Australia
- T20I debut (cap 37): 20 January 2012 v Australia
- Last T20I: 30 September 2020 v Australia

Domestic team information
- Years: Team
- 2006/07–2022/23: Auckland
- 2020/21: Adelaide Strikers

Career statistics
Competition	WODI	WT20I	WLA	WT20
Matches	73	55	208	172
Runs scored	1198	448	4,668	2,699
Batting average	27.22	17.23	33.58	26.99
100s/50s	0/4	0/0	4/27	0/9
Top score	78	34	113*	75*
Catches/stumpings	35/–	15/–	95/–	53/–
- Source: CricketArchive, 6 March 2023

Katie Teresa Perkins (born 7 July 1988) is a New Zealand former cricketer who played as a right-handed batter. She appeared in 73 One Day Internationals and 55 Twenty20 Internationals for New Zealand between 2012 and 2020. She played domestic cricket for Auckland, as well as playing one match for Adelaide Strikers.

In 2013, she graduated as a police constable from the Royal New Zealand Police College.

== Career ==
Perkins made her Women's T20 International cricket (WT20I) debut for New Zealand Women against Australia on 20 January 2012. Five days later, she made her Women's One Day International cricket (WODI) debut against the same team.

In August 2018, she was awarded a central contract by New Zealand Cricket, following the tours of Ireland and England in the previous months. In January 2020, she was named in New Zealand's squad for the 2020 ICC Women's T20 World Cup in Australia.

Perkins retired from all forms of cricket in February 2023.
