= Amy Satterthwaite =

New Zealand cricketer

Amy Satterthwaite MNZM
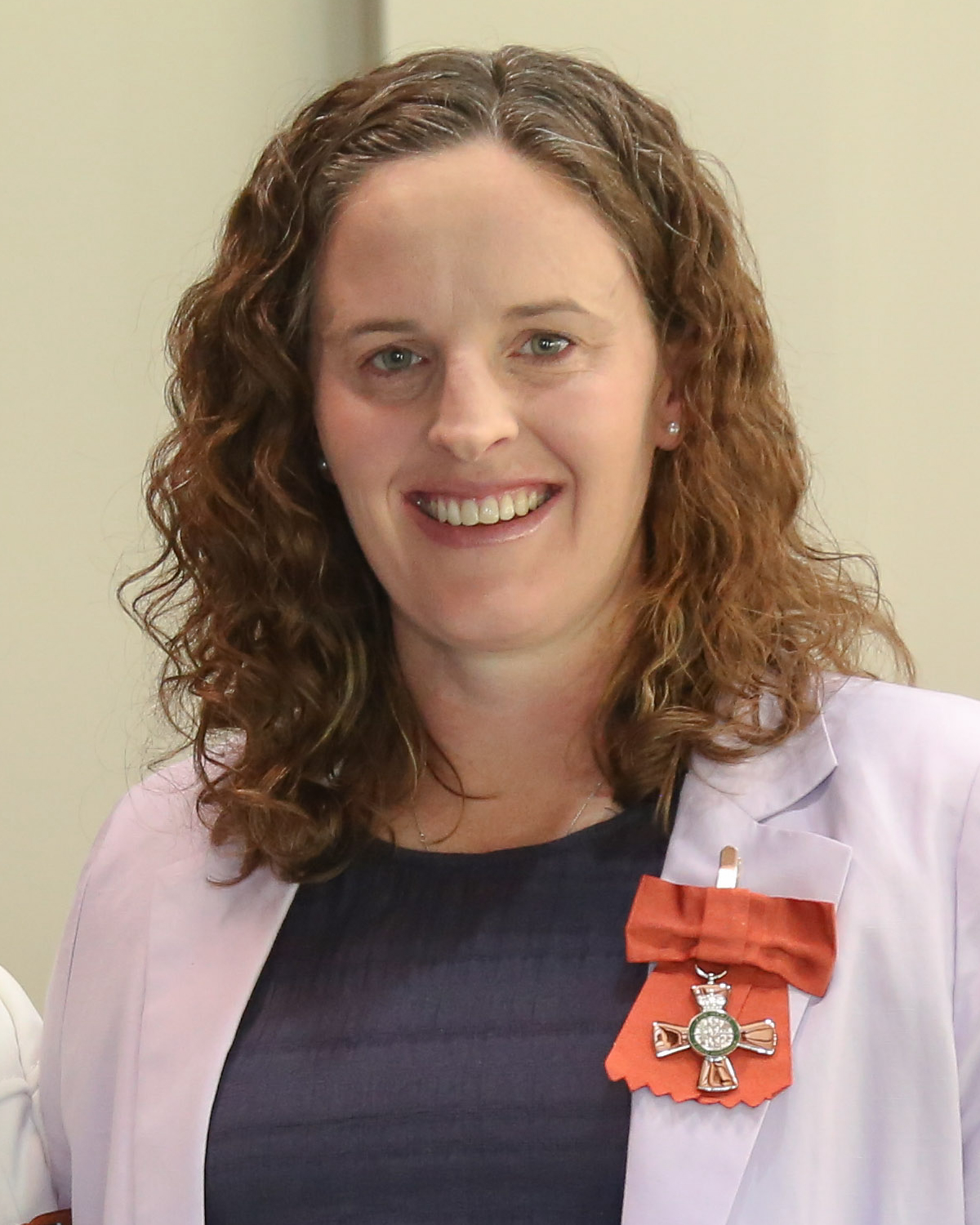
- Satterthwaite in 2024

Personal information
- Full name: Amy Ella Satterthwaite
- Born: 7 October 1986 (age 40); Christchurch, New Zealand
- Batting: Left-handed
- Bowling: Right-arm medium; right-arm off break
- Role: All-rounder
- Relatives: Lea Tahuhu (wife)

International information
- National side: New Zealand (2007–2022)
- ODI debut (cap 106): 21 July 2007 v Australia
- Last ODI: 26 March 2022 v Pakistan
- T20I debut (cap 18): 19 July 2007 v Australia
- Last T20I: 9 September 2021 v England

Domestic team information
- Years: Team
- 2003/04–2022/23: Canterbury
- 2014/15–2015/16: Tasmania
- 2015/16–2016/17: Hobart Hurricanes
- 2016–2018: Lancashire Thunder
- 2017: Lancashire
- 2017/18–2018/19: Melbourne Renegades
- 2018/19: Tasmania
- 2020/21: Melbourne Renegades
- 2022: Manchester Originals

Career statistics
Competition	WODI	WT20I	WLA	WT20
Matches	145	111	323	314
Runs scored	4,639	1,784	10,244	6,957
Batting average	38.33	21.49	41.47	29.35
100s/50s	7/27	0/1	15/66	1/30
Top score	137*	71*	137*	114
Balls bowled	1,930	513	8,052	3,163
Wickets	50	26	215	161
Bowling average	29.72	23.42	26.43	21.33
5 wickets in innings	0	1	1	2
10 wickets in match	0	0	0	0
Best bowling	4/13	6/17	5/27	6/17
Catches/stumpings	56/–	36/–	139/–	128/–
- Source: CricketArchive, 6 March 2023

Amy Ella Satterthwaite MNZM (born 7 October 1986) is a New Zealand former cricketer who played as an all-rounder, batting left-handed and bowling either right-arm medium or off break. She appeared in 145 One Day Internationals and 111 Twenty20 Internationals for New Zealand between 2007 and 2022. She played domestic cricket for Canterbury, Tasmania, Hobart Hurricanes, Melbourne Renegades, Lancashire Thunder, Lancashire and Manchester Originals.

On 26 February 2017, against Australia, she became the first player in WODIs and second overall after Kumar Sangakkara in ODIs to score four consecutive hundreds. In December 2017, she won the inaugural ICC Women's ODI Player of the Year award. In September 2018, Suzie Bates stepped down as captain of New Zealand and was replaced by Satterthwaite.

In July 2020, Satterthwaite was appointed as the vice-captain of the New Zealand women's cricket team, with Sophie Devine appointed as the team's captain on a full-time basis. In September 2020, in the first match of New Zealand's series against Australia, Satterthwaite played in her 100th WT20I. In May 2022, Satterthwaite announced her retirement from international cricket, and from all cricket.

== Playing career ==
=== Domestic and franchise career ===
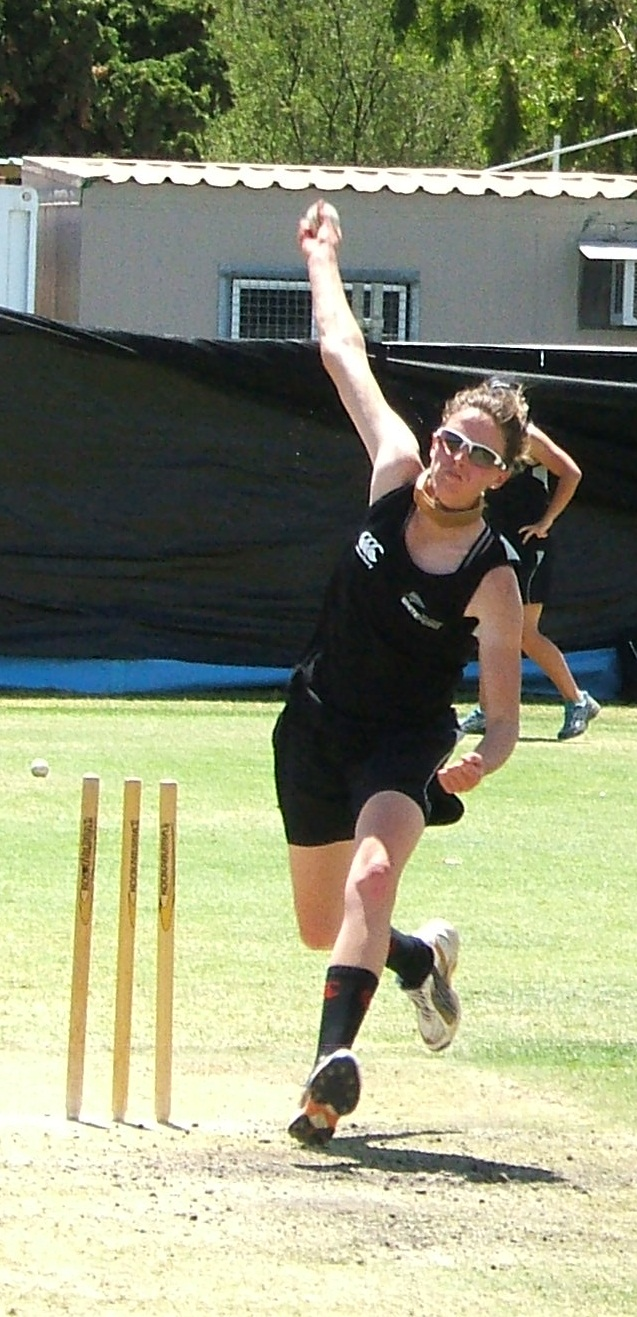
Satterthwaite bowling at a training session in 2010

Satterthwaite made her debut for Canterbury Magicians at limited overs level in 2003.

In 2007, Satterthwaite became captain of the Magicians, initially on a temporary basis due to regular captain Haidee Tiffen having a virus.

In 2016, Satterthwaite was appointed captain of the Lancashire Thunder in the Women's Cricket Super League. She played in five matches for the Thunder in July and August 2016.

During the 2014–15 season, Satterthwaite played nine matches for the Tasmanian Roar; four times in the Australian Women's Twenty20 Cup and five in the Women's National Cricket League.

Satterthwaite signed for the Hobart Hurricanes ahead of the 2015–16 Women's Big Bash League season. In 2016, she resigned for the Hurricanes for the 2016–17 Women's Big Bash League season. In November 2018, she was named in the Melbourne Renegades' squad for the 2018–19 Women's Big Bash League season.

In April 2022, she was bought by the Manchester Originals for the 2022 season of The Hundred in England. She announced her retirement from all forms of cricket in February 2023. In her final season with Canterbury, she captained them to victory in the 2022–23 Super Smash.

=== International career ===
Satterthwaite made her international debut for New Zealand against Australia on 19 July 2007 in a Twenty20 International. She made her One Day International debut two days later, also against Australia.

In August 2007, she took six wickets for seventeen runs against England; this remained the only six-wicket haul in a women's T20I match until 20 August 2018 when Botsogo Mpedi of Botswana took 6/8.

Starting during the Pakistan's tour to New Zealand in November 2016, and then into the Australian women's team tour of New Zealand in 2017, Satterthwaite became the first woman to score a century in four consecutive innings in ODIs.

Satterthwaite has captained New Zealand twice in One Day International cricket, the first against Ireland in 2010 and the second against Pakistan in 2016.

During the 2017 ICC Women's Cricket World Cup, she equalled the record of Lydia Greenway for taking the most catches in a single Women's Cricket World Cup series(8)

In August 2018, she was awarded a central contract by New Zealand Cricket, following the tours of Ireland and England in the previous months. In October 2018, she was named as captain of New Zealand's squad for the 2018 ICC Women's World Twenty20 tournament in the West Indies. In February 2022, she was named as the vice-captain of New Zealand's team for the 2022 Women's Cricket World Cup in New Zealand.

In the 2023 King's Birthday and Coronation Honours, Satterthwaite was appointed a Member of the New Zealand Order of Merit, for services to cricket.

== International centuries ==
One Day International centuries
Runs	Match	Opponents	City	Venue	Year
109	47	Australia	Sydney, Australia	North Sydney Oval	2012
103	54	England	Mumbai, India	Brabourne Stadium	2013
137*	89	Pakistan	Lincoln, New Zealand	Bert Sutcliffe Oval	2016
115*	90	Pakistan	Lincoln, New Zealand	Bert Sutcliffe Oval	2016
123	92	Pakistan	Nelson, New Zealand	Saxton Oval	2016
102*	93	Australia	Auckland, New Zealand	Eden Park Outer Oval	2017
119*	125	England	Dunedin, New Zealand	University Oval	2021

== Personal life ==
Satterthwaite was born in Christchurch and grew up in Culverden in north Canterbury. Her father, Michael Satterthwaite, represented Canterbury Country in cricket and is a former chairman of Canterbury Cricket. She states that she grew up with cricket and "had a love for the game from when [she] could walk!" Satterthwaite was for many years office manager for a veterinary practice, and since 2015 has been employed by Canterbury Cricket.

In March 2017, she married fellow international cricketer Lea Tahuhu. In August 2019, Satterthwaite announced that she and Tahuhu were expecting their first child, and was taking a break from cricket. She missed the 2020 ICC Women's T20 World Cup in Australia, but hoped to be in the team's squad for the 2022 Women's Cricket World Cup in New Zealand.

In 2020 Satterthwaite gave birth to a daughter. In 2024, the couple became parents again, to a baby boy.
