= New Zealand women's cricket team in England in 1954 =

	England	New Zealand
- Dates: 22 May – 5 August 1954
Captains	Molly Hide	Rona McKenzie

Test series
- Result: England won the 3-match series 1–0
Most runs	Joan Wilkinson (185)	Phyl Blackler (144)
Most wickets	Mary Duggan (13)	Joan Francis (12)

The New Zealand women's national cricket team toured England between May and August 1954. They played against England in three Test matches, with England winning the series 1–0.

== Squads ==
England	New Zealand
Molly Hide (c); Betty Birch; Jean Cummins; Mary Duggan; Kay Green; Helene Hegarty; Polly Marshall; Barbara Murrey; Mary Johnson; Anne Sanders; Hazel Sanders; Joan Westbrook (wk); Joan Wilkinson	Rona McKenzie (c); Peg Batty; Phyl Blackler; Jean Coulston; Verna Coutts; Joyce Currie; Vi Farrell (wk); Joan Francis; Joan Hatcher; Ina Lamason; Joy Lamason; Ann Mitchell; Eris Paton; Joyce Powell (wk); Mary Rouse; Betty Sinclair

== Tour Matches ==
=== 1-day single innings match: Warwickshire and South Midlands v New Zealand ===
22 May 1954
Scorecard

New Zealand; 172/5d (68 overs)	v	Warwickshire and South Midlands; 107 (49 overs)
Rona McKenzie 60* (–); Con Holden 2/27 (23 overs)		Rosalie Darvill 22 (–); Eris Paton 2/8 (6 overs)

New Zealand Women won by 65 runs
Edgbaston Cricket Ground, Birmingham
Umpires: Elizabeth Riley (Eng) and E White (Eng)

- New Zealand Women won the toss and elected to bat.

=== 1-day single innings match: North Midlands v New Zealand ===
27 May 1954
Scorecard

New Zealand; 175/8d (72 overs)	v	North Midlands; 86 (42 overs)
Rona McKenzie 29 (–); Annie Geeves 5/55 (25 overs)		Annie Geeves 23 (–); Phyl Blackler 4/23 (8 overs)

New Zealand Women won by 89 runs
Arlington Avenue, Leamington Spa
Umpires: T Bartholomew (Eng) and M Cox (Eng)

- New Zealand Women won the toss and elected to bat.

=== 2-day match: Midland Counties v New Zealand ===
29 – 30 May 1954
Scorecard

New Zealand	v	Midland Counties
100 (79.2 overs); Rona McKenzie 26 (–); Sheila Blyde 6/23 (20.2 overs)		34 (36 overs); M Hind 11 (–); Joan Francis 5/7 (18 overs)
105/5d (75 overs); Joyce Powell 23 (–); June Bragger 3/33 (28 overs)		62 (42.3 overs); June Howard 14 (–); Phyl Blackler 6/9 (11 overs)

New Zealand Women won by 109 runs
Queen's Park, Chesterfield
Umpires: M Cox (Eng) and Jacqueline Luck (Eng)

- Midland Counties Women won the toss and elected to field.

=== 1-day single innings match: Yorkshire v New Zealand ===
2 June 1954
Scorecard

New Zealand; 185/6d (72.5 overs)	v	Yorkshire; 188/4 (53 overs)
Phyl Blackler 103* (–); Mary Johnson 3/44 (20 overs)		Brenda Rothera 59 (–); Ina Lamason 2/56 (11 overs)

Yorkshire Women won by 6 wickets
North Marine Road Ground, Scarborough
Umpires: Doris Turner (Eng) and M Scaramuzza (Eng)

- Yorkshire Women won the toss and elected to field.

=== 2-day match: North of England v New Zealand ===
5, 7 June 1954
Scorecard

North of England	v	New Zealand
141 (59.3 overs); Joan Wilkinson 71 (–); Joan Francis 6/77 (30 overs)		302 (87 overs); Eris Paton 100 (–); Ivy Wilson 4/54 (17 overs)
163 (68.4 overs); Margaret Lockwood 60 (–); Rona McKenzie 5/34 (18.4 overs)		4/0 (0.4 overs); Joan Hatcher 4* (4)

New Zealand Women won by 10 wickets
St George's Road Cricket Ground, Harrogate
Umpires: Ora Carse (Eng) and Barbara Wood (Eng)

- North of England Women won the toss and elected to bat.

=== 1-day single innings match: Northern Counties v New Zealand ===
9 June 1954
Scorecard

Northern Counties; 119 (40 overs)	v	New Zealand; 42/3 (22 overs)
Ivy Wilson 29 (–); Rona McKenzie 3/20 (5 overs)		Joy Lamason 20 (–); M Hall 2/7 (3 overs)

Match drawn
Osborne Avenue, Jesmond
Umpires: Ora Carse (Eng) and Jack Hewin (NZ)

- New Zealand Women won the toss and elected to field.

=== 1-day single innings match: Oxfordshire, Berkshire and Sussex v New Zealand ===
19 June 1954
Scorecard

New Zealand; 155/7d (88 overs)	v	Oxfordshire, Berkshire and Sussex; 82/9 (47 overs)
Verna Coutts 64* (–); Doreen Eyre 3/16 (12 overs)		Audrey Disbury 42 (–); Eris Paton 3/19 (14 overs)

Match drawn
Christ Church Ground, Oxford
Umpires: Jacqueline Luck (Eng) and Netta Rheinberg (Eng)

- Oxfordshire, Berkshire and Sussex Women won the toss and elected to field.

=== 1-day match: Western Counties v New Zealand ===
22 June 1954
Scorecard

Western Counties	v	New Zealand
55 (40.1 overs); S Tandy 12 (–); Phyl Blackler 4/24 (12 overs)		124/7d (34 overs); Joan Hatcher 28 (–); Elizabeth Carling 2/22 (10 overs)
60/8 (41 overs); S Tandy 22 (–); Peg Batty 3/4 (4 overs)

Match drawn
Dean Park Cricket Ground, Bournemouth
Umpires: Jane Ayres (Eng) and J Gregory (Eng)

- Western Counties Women won the toss and elected to bat.

=== 2-day match: West of England v New Zealand ===
25 – 26 June 1954
Scorecard

New Zealand	v	West of England
274 (89.3 overs); Joy Lamason 58 (–); Anne Flann 3/56 (23.3 overs)		46 (46.1 overs); Elizabeth Carling 14 (–); Joyce Currie 6/22 (20 overs)
76 (53 overs) (f/o); S Tandy 23 (–); Phyl Blackler 5/20 (14 overs)

New Zealand Women won by an innings and 152 runs
Recreation Ground, Torquay
Umpires: K Gregory (Eng) and Grace Morgan (Eng)

- New Zealand Women won the toss and elected to bat.

=== 1-day single innings match: Western Counties v New Zealand ===
30 June 1954
Scorecard

Western Counties; 104 (69.5 overs)	v	New Zealand; 179/4 (51 overs)
K Page 33 (–); Eris Paton 6/28 (16.5 overs)		Joyce Powell 55 (–); Betty Starr 1/27 (8 overs)

New Zealand Women won by 8 wickets
Cardiff Arms Park, Cardiff
Umpires: Doris Turner (Eng) and Jacqueline Luck (Eng)

- New Zealand Women won the toss and elected to field.
- New Zealand Women batted on after winning.

=== 1-day single innings match: East Anglia v New Zealand ===
10 July 1954
Scorecard

East Anglia; 145/8d (70 overs)	v	New Zealand; 149/2 (35 overs)
Audrey Collins 55 (–); Jean Coulston 4/28 (22 overs)		Rona McKenzie 76* (–); E Gaskell 1/21 (6 overs)

New Zealand Women won by 8 wickets
Richmond Drive, Skegness
Umpires: Elizabeth Riley (Eng) and Norah Wilcox (Eng)

- New Zealand Women won the toss and elected to field.

=== 1-day single innings match: Essex and Kent v New Zealand ===
14 July 1954
Scorecard

New Zealand; 175/6d (65 overs)	v	Essex and Kent; 122 (40.4 overs)
Verna Coutts 43 (–); Elizabeth Riley 2/58 (18 overs)		E Burton 29 (–); Eris Paton 3/22 (8.4 overs)

New Zealand Women won by 53 runs
Chalkwell Park, Southend-on-Sea
Umpires: M Oliver (Eng) and Norah Wilcox (Eng)

- Essex and Kent Women won the toss and elected to field.

=== 2-day match: East of England v New Zealand ===
16 – 17 July 1954
Scorecard

New Zealand	v	East of England
296/5d (80 overs); Eris Paton 78* (–); Elizabeth Riley 2/49 (14 overs)		79/8 (38.2 overs); Jean Lillico 26 (–); Eris Paton 6/34 (15.2 overs)

Match drawn
Cheriton Road, Folkestone
Umpires: Jane Ayres (Eng) and Doris Turner (Eng)

- New Zealand Women won the toss and elected to bat.

=== 1-day single innings match: South of England Second XI v New Zealand ===
21 July 1954
Scorecard

South of England Second XI; 172/9d (65 overs)	v	New Zealand; 118/8 (56 overs)
Elizabeth Pike 40 (–); Jean Coulston 2/8 (8 overs)		Joyce Powell 41 (–); Doreen Polley 3/18 (18 overs)

Match drawn
Hindhead Playing Field, Hindhead
Umpires: Jane Ayres (Eng) and M Oliver (Eng)

- South of England Second XI Women won the toss and elected to bat.

=== 2-day match: South of England v New Zealand ===
31 July, 2 August 1954
Scorecard

New Zealand	v	South of England
211 (82 overs); Verna Coutts 56* (–); Mary Duggan 3/68 (27 overs)		213/5d (74 overs); Jean Cummins 100 (–); Phyl Blackler 2/39 (16 overs)
178/1d (48.4 overs); Phyl Blackler 102* (–); Molly Hide 1/30 (8 overs)		178/6 (47.4 overs); Molly Hide 43* (–); Joyce Currie 4/68 (18.4 overs)

South of England Women won by 4 wickets
Central Recreation Ground, Hastings
Umpires: Doris Turner (Eng) and Enid Stevenson (Eng)

- New Zealand Women won the toss and elected to bat.

=== 1-day single innings match: Combined Services v New Zealand ===
5 August 1954
Scorecard

Combined Services; 134 (80.5 overs)	v	New Zealand; 136/5 (38 overs)
Joan Wilkinson 29 (–); Ina Lamason 3/7 (10 overs)		Joyce Powell 57 (–); M Goodinson 3/33 (9 overs)

New Zealand Women won by 5 wickets
RAF Halton Cricket Ground, Aylesbury
Umpires: Doris Turner (Eng) and Isabel Nowell-Smith (Eng)

- New Zealand Women won the toss and elected to field.

== WTest Series ==
=== 1st Test ===
12 – 14 June 1954
Scorecard

New Zealand	v	England
144 (110.5 overs); Phyl Blackler 42 (–); Molly Hide 3/23 (30 overs)		154 (73.1 overs); Barbara Murrey 56 (–); Rona McKenzie 4/18 (15 overs)
104 (64 overs); Phyl Blackler 35 (–); Mary Duggan 3/29 (23 overs)		95/4 (45.4 overs); Joan Wilkinson 51* (–); Eris Paton 2/17 (6 overs)

England Women won by 6 wickets
Headingley Cricket Ground, Leeds
Umpires: Barbara Wood (Eng) and Elizabeth Riley (Eng)

- New Zealand Women won the toss and elected to bat.
- Jean Cummins, Kay Green, Helene Hegarty, Joan Westbrook (Eng), Verna Coutts, Rona McKenzie, Eris Paton, Joyce Powell, Mary Rouse and Betty Sinclair (NZ) all made their WTest debuts.

=== 2nd Test ===
3 – 6 July 1954
Scorecard

England	v	New Zealand
112 (41.5 overs); Joan Wilkinson 24 (–); Phyl Blackler 4/22 (6.5 overs)		63 (48.5 overs); Jean Coulston 18 (–); Mary Duggan 4/15 (14.5 overs)
288/7d (94 overs); Betty Birch 83* (–); Joan Francis 4/72 (23 overs)		174/6 (134 overs); Phyl Blackler 46 (–); Anne Sanders 1/16 (23 overs)

Match drawn
County Ground, Worcester
Umpires: Grace Morgan (Eng) and M Oliver (Eng)

- England Women won the toss and elected to bat.
- Anne Sanders (Eng) and Jean Coulston (NZ) both made their WTest debuts.

=== 3rd Test ===
24 – 27 July 1954
Scorecard

England	v	New Zealand
281 (98 overs); Joan Wilkinson 62 (–); Jean Coulston 4/38 (31 overs)		186 (96.3 overs); Ina Lamason 37* (–); Helene Hegarty 5/48 (27 overs)

Match drawn
The Oval, London
Umpires: Elizabeth Riley (Eng) and Enid Stevenson (Eng)

- England Women won the toss and elected to bat.
- Polly Marshall (Eng) and Joyce Currie (NZ) both made their WTest debuts.
