= New Zealand women's cricket team in Australia in 1956–57 =

	Australia	New Zealand
- Dates: 29 December 1956 – 29 January 1957
Captains	Una Paisley	Rona McKenzie

Test series
- Result: Australia won the 1-match series 1–0
Most runs	Una Paisley (101)	Joyce Powell (62)
Most wickets	Ruth Dow (5); Betty Wilson (5)	Jean Coulston (4)

The New Zealand women's national cricket team toured Australia in December 1956 and January 1957. They played against Australia in one Test match, which Australia won by an innings and 88 runs. They also competed in the 1956–57 Australian Women's Cricket Championships, a domestic two-day competition, winning one match and drawing the other three.

== Squads ==
Australia	New Zealand
Una Paisley (c); Mary Allitt; Joyce Bath; Joyce Christ; Ruth Dow; Eileen Massey; Barbara Orchard; Kit Raymond; Val Slater; Olive Smith (wk); Betty Wilson	Rona McKenzie (c); Phyl Blackler; Jean Coulston; Verna Coutts; Brenda Duncan; Joyce Powell (wk); Mary Rouse; Jean Stonell; Gwen Sutherland; Betty Thorner; Ana Tini; Mary Webb

== Tour Matches ==
=== 1-day single innings match: Deniliquin v New Zealand ===
29 December 1956
Scorecard

New Zealand; 132/3d	v	Deniliquin; 104
Jean Stonell 58* (–); Jean Knight 1/6		Mary Allitt 58 (–); Brenda Duncan 5/21

New Zealand Women won by 28 runs
Memorial Park, Deniliquin

- Toss not known.

=== 1-day single innings match: Victoria v New Zealand ===
29 January 1957
Scorecard

New Zealand; 176/6d	v	Victoria; 108/9
Verna Coutts 71 (–)		Nell Massey 19 (–); Phyl Blackler 6/26

Match drawn
Scotch College Ground, Melbourne

- New Zealand Women won the toss and elected to bat.

== Only WTest ==
18 – 21 January 1957
Scorecard

Australia	v	New Zealand
354/9d (150.1 overs); Una Paisley 101 (–); Jean Coulston 4/94 (49.1 overs)		98 (52 overs); Rona McKenzie 27 (–); Betty Wilson 3/23 (10 overs)
		168 (106.1 overs) (f/o); Joyce Powell 49 (–); Val Slater 4/13 (10.1 overs)

Australia Women won by an innings and 88 runs
King's College Oval, Adelaide

- Australia Women won the toss and elected to bat.
- Joyce Bath, Ruth Dow, Eileen Massey, Barbara Orchard, Kit Raymond, Olive Smith, Val Slater (Aus), Brenda Duncan, Jean Stonell, Gwen Sutherland, Betty Thorner and Mary Webb (NZ) all made their WTest debuts.
