= Australia women's cricket team in New Zealand in 1947–48 =

Australian women's tour of New Zealand in 1947-48
	New Zealand Women	Australia women
- Dates: 25 February – 23 March
Captains	Ina Lamason	Molly Dive

Test series
- Result: Australia women won the 1-match series 1–0
Most runs	Joan Hatcher (44)	Una Paisley (108)
Most wickets	Joan Francis (2); Phyl Blackler (2); Billie Fulford (2)	Betty Wilson (10)

Australian women's cricket team toured New Zealand in February–March 1948. Australians won the Test series by 1–0. Australians also played seven tour matches.

== WTest Series ==
=== Only WTest ===
20 – 23 March 1948
Scorecard

Australia	v	New Zealand
338/6d (122.4 overs); Una Paisley 108; Phyl Blackler 2/32 (15.4 overs)		149 (82.3 overs); Phyl Blackler 34; Betty Wilson 4/37 (26 overs)
		87 (54 overs) (f/o); Joan Hatcher 23; Betty Wilson 6/28 (14 overs)

Australia women won by an innings and 102 runs
Basin Reserve, Wellington
Umpires: RE Dore (NZ) and Brownie Watson (NZ)

- Australia women won the toss and elected to bat.
- 21 March was taken as a rest day
- Joan Hatcher, Billie Fulford, Joy Lamason, Hilda Thompson, Phyl Blackler, Una Wickham, Joan Francis, Vi Farrell (NZ), Joan Schmidt, Molly Dive, Una Paisley, Betty Wilson, Lorna Beal, Norma Whiteman, Thelma McKenzie, Myrtle Edwards and Myrtle Baylis (Aus) all made their WTest debuts.
- First-ever Women's test between Australia and New Zealand.
- First-ever Women's Test at this venue.
