= Lamason (disambiguation) =

Lamason may refer to any of the following:

== People ==
- Ina Lamason (1911-1994), New Zealand women's cricketer
- Jack Lamason (1905-1961), New Zealand cricketer
- Joy Lamason (1915–2012), New Zealand cricketer
- Phil Lamason (1918-2012), New Zealand pilot during World War II

== Places ==
- Lamasón, municipality located in the autonomous community of Cantabria, Spain

== See also ==
- Charles N. Lamison
- Otis Lamson
