= Helen Miller =

Helen Miller may refer to:

- Helen Miller (cricketer) (1915–1972), New Zealand cricketer
- Helen Miller (politician) (born 1945), American politician
- Helen Miller (songwriter) (1925–2006), American songwriter
- Helen Hill Miller (1899–1995), American journalist and author
- Helen Markley Miller (1896–1984), American writer
- Helen Day Miller (1838–1889), wife of the American financier Jay Gould
- Helen Miller (Gould) Shepard (1868–1938), American philanthropist, daughter of the financier Jay Gould
