= Ethna Rouse =

New Zealand cricketer (1937–2023)

Ethna Rouse QSM
Personal information
- Full name: Ethna Frances Rouse
- Born: 29 December 1937; Christchurch, New Zealand
- Died: 7 June 2023 (aged 85); Christchurch, New Zealand
- Batting: Left-handed
- Role: Batter
- Relatives: Mary Rouse (sister-in-law)

International information
- National side: New Zealand (1972–1973)
- Only Test (cap 62): 25 February 1972 v South Africa
- ODI debut (cap 14): 30 June 1973 v International XI
- Last ODI: 21 July 1973 v Young England

Domestic team information
- Years: Team
- 1953/54–1972/73: Canterbury

Career statistics
Competition	WTest	WODI	WFC
Matches	1	3	43
Runs scored	36	90	1,228
Batting average	18.00	30.00	22.32
100s/50s	0/0	0/0	2/5
Top score	35	48	116*
Balls bowled	–	–	624
Wickets	–	–	19
Bowling average	–	–	12.11
5 wickets in innings	–	–	0
10 wickets in match	–	–	0
Best bowling	–	–	3/9
Catches/stumpings	0/–	0/–	23/–
- Source: CricketArchive, 12 November 2021

Ethna Frances Rouse QSM (née Woods; 29 December 1937 – 7 June 2023) was a New Zealand cricketer who played as a left-handed batter. She appeared in one Test match and three One Day Internationals for New Zealand in 1972 and 1973. She played domestic cricket for Canterbury.

In the 2004 New Year Honours, Rouse was awarded the Queen's Service Medal for community service.

Rouse died in Christchurch on 7 June 2023, at the age of 85.
