= Merle Hollis =

New Zealand cricketer

Personal information
- Full name: Merle Hollis
- Born: 22 May 1915; Dunedin, New Zealand
- Died: 31 August 1980 (aged 65); Dunedin, New Zealand
- Batting: Right-handed
- Bowling: Right-arm medium
- Role: Bowler

International information
- National side: New Zealand (1935)
- Only Test (cap 6): 16 February 1935 v England

Career statistics
Competition	WTest
Matches	1
Runs scored	26
Batting average	13.00
100s/50s	0/0
Top score	24
Balls bowled	108
Wickets	1
Bowling average	81.00
5 wickets in innings	0
10 wickets in match	0
Best bowling	1/81
Catches/stumpings	0/–
- Source: CricketArchive, 29 November 2021

Merle Hollis (22 May 1915 – 31 August 1980) was a New Zealand cricketer who played primarily as a right-arm medium bowler. She played in one Test match for New Zealand, their first, in 1935. This was the only official match she ever played.
