= Lorna Beal =

Australian cricketer (1923–2020)

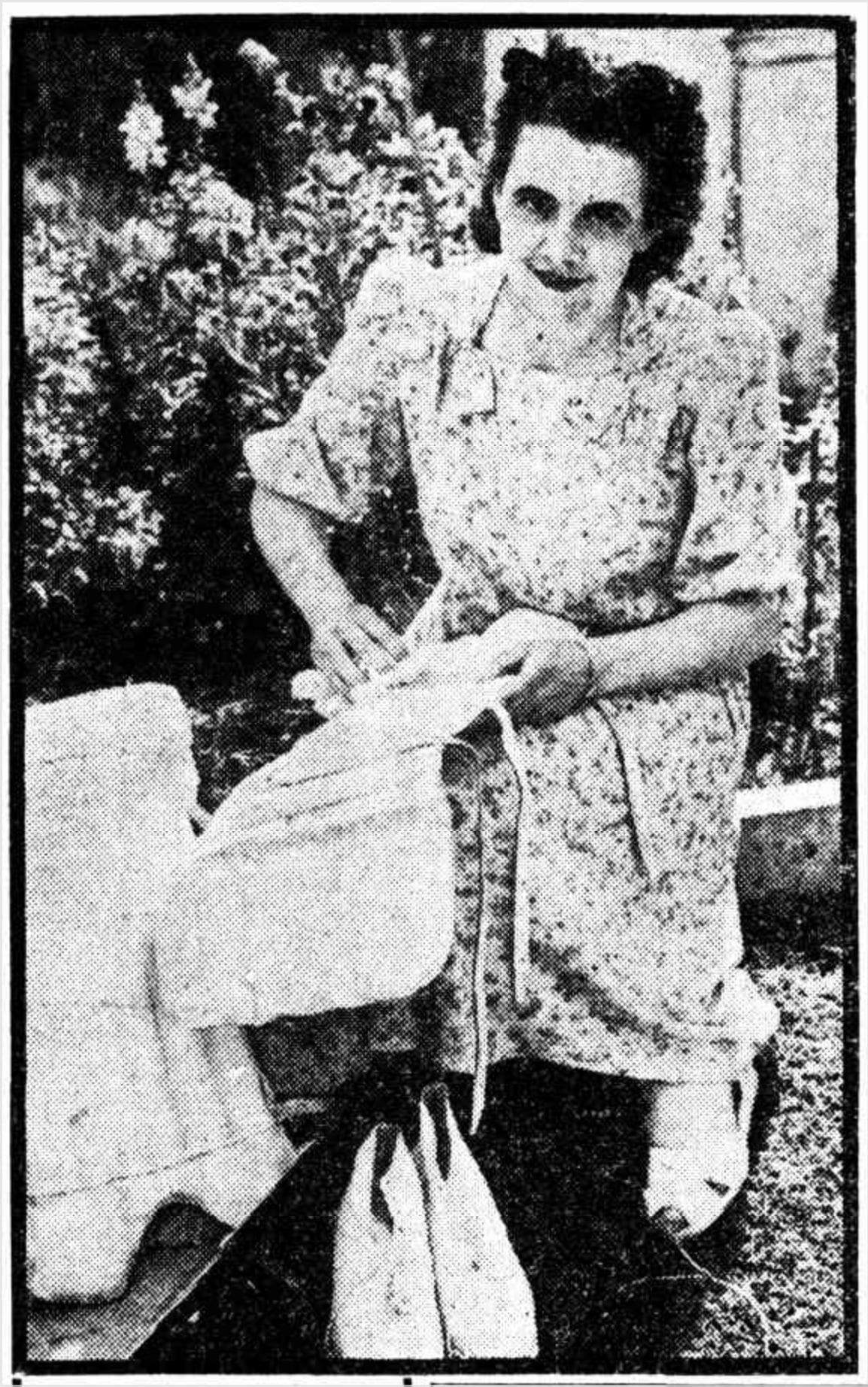
- Larter pictured in the Perth Daily News in November 1948

Personal information
- Born: 28 November 1923; Hawthorn, Victoria, Australia
- Died: 10 August 2020 (aged 96)
- Batting: Right-handed
- Role: Wicket-keeper

International information
- National side: Australia
- Test debut (cap 26): 20 March 1948 v New Zealand
- Last Test: 28 July 1951 v England
- Source: CricInfo

Lorna Beal (née Larter; 28 November 1923 – 10 August 2020) was an Australian cricketer. Beal played seven Test matches for the Australia women's cricket team.

Her debut was in 1948 in the first women's Test match between Australia and New Zealand at the Basin Reserve in Wellington. Her final match was in Australia's 1951 tour to England. She kept wicket in Australia's first seven Test matches following World War II.

It was on the 1951 tour that she met her future husband, Roy Beal. She then retired from cricket, and took up golf. Beal was a recipient of an Australian Sports Medal in 2000.
