= Russell Watt =

New Zealand rugby union player (1935–2022)

- Born: James Russell Watt; 29 December 1935 Dunedin, New Zealand
- Died: 25 June 2022 (aged 86) Silverstream, New Zealand
- Height: 1.80 m (5 ft 11 in)
- Weight: 78 kg (172 lb)
- School: Otago Boys' High School
- Occupation: Bank officer

Rugby union career
- Position: Wing three-quarter
Provincial / State sides
Years	Team	Apps	(Points)
1955–1956	Otago	11	
1957	Southland	9	
1958–1964	Wellington	63	
International career
Years	Team	Apps	(Points)
1957–1962	New Zealand	9	(3)

James Russell Watt (29 December 1935 – 25 June 2022) was a New Zealand rugby union player. A wing three-quarter, Watt represented Otago, Southland, and Wellington at a provincial level, and was a member of the New Zealand national side, the All Blacks, between 1957 and 1962. He played 42 matches for the All Blacks including nine internationals, scoring 114 points in all.

On 30 April 1960, Watt became engaged to Betty Thorner, and the couple later married.

Watt died on 25 June 2022 in Silverstream, at the age of 86.
