= Dot Bailey =

New Zealand cricketer

Personal information
- Full name: Doris Lilian Bailey
- Born: 6 December 1916; Wellington, New Zealand
- Died: 30 November 2009 (aged 92); Waikanae, New Zealand
- Batting: Right-handed
- Bowling: Right-arm medium
- Role: Batter
- Relatives: Joan Hatcher (sister)

International information
- National side: New Zealand (1949)
- Only Test (cap 22): 26 March 1949 v England

Domestic team information
- Years: Team
- 1935/36–1949/50: Wellington

Career statistics
Competition	WTest	WFC
Matches	1	13
Runs scored	6	604
Batting average	3.00	31.78
100s/50s	0/0	1/3
Top score	5	117
Balls bowled	–	18
Wickets	–	0
Bowling average	–	–
5 wickets in innings	–	0
10 wickets in match	–	0
Best bowling	–	–
Catches/stumpings	0/–	3/–
- Source: CricketArchive, 27 November 2021

Doris Lilian Bailey (6 December 1916 – 30 November 2009) was a New Zealand cricketer who played as a right-handed batter. She played in one Test match for New Zealand in 1949. She played domestic cricket for Wellington.
