= James Franklin (cricketer) =

New Zealand cricketer

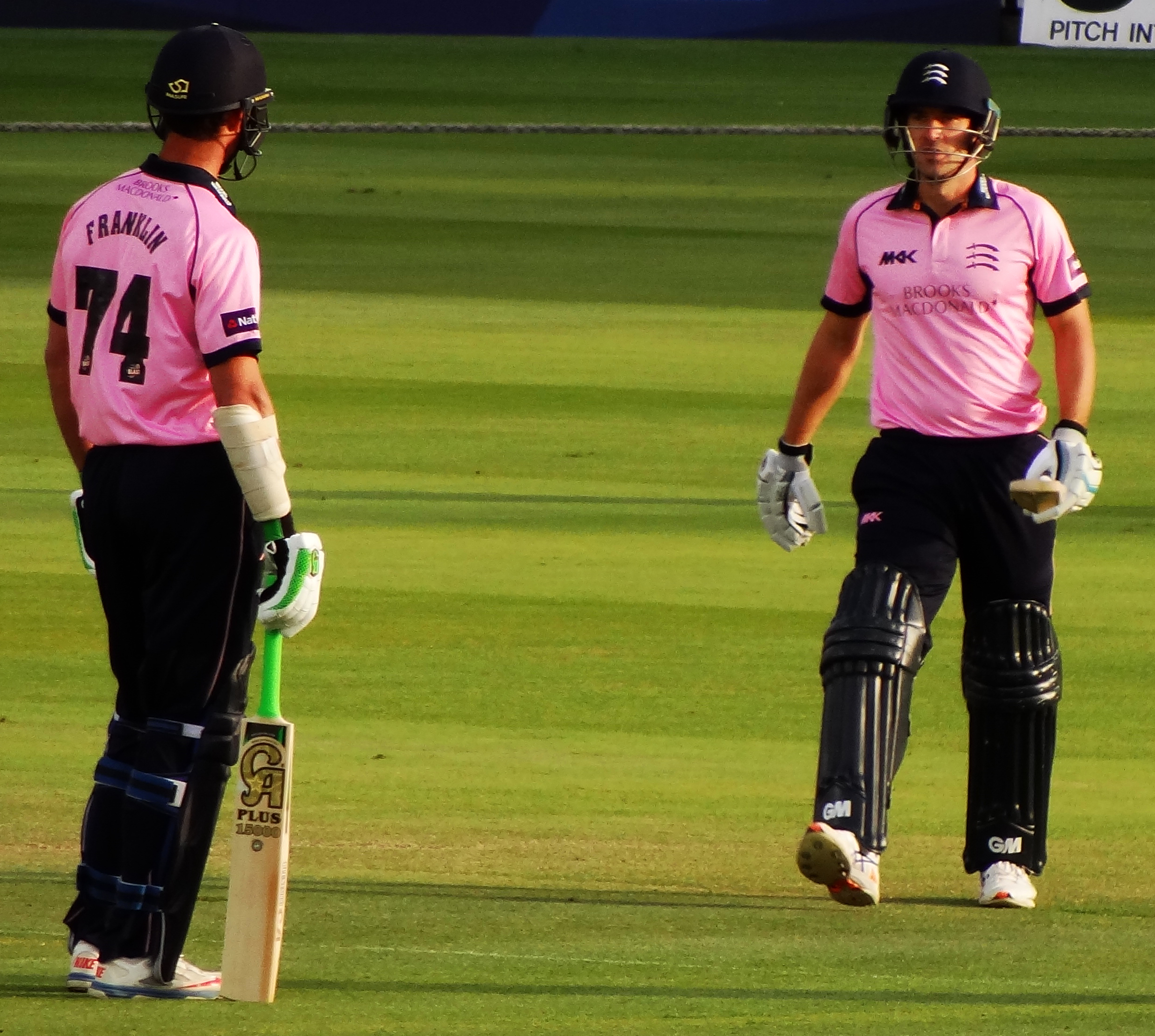
- Franklin (left) and Joe Burns in 2015

Personal information
- Full name: James Edward Franklin
- Born: 7 November 1980 (age 46); Wellington, New Zealand
- Batting: Left-handed
- Bowling: Left-arm medium
- Role: All rounder
- Relatives: Jean Coulston (aunt)

International information
- National side: New Zealand (2001–2013)
- Test debut (cap 214): 8 March 2001 v Pakistan
- Last Test: 2 January 2013 v South Africa
- ODI debut (cap 118): 2 January 2001 v Zimbabwe
- Last ODI: 16 June 2013 v England
- ODI shirt no.: 70
- T20I debut (cap 17): 16 February 2006 v West Indies
- Last T20I: 27 June 2013 v England
- T20I shirt no.: 70

Domestic team information
- Years: Team
- 1998/99–2014/15: Wellington
- 2004: Gloucestershire
- 2006: Glamorgan
- 2009–2010: Gloucestershire
- 2011–2012: Mumbai Indians
- 2011/12: Adelaide Strikers
- 2012: Essex
- 2013: Guyana Amazon Warriors
- 2014: Nottinghamshire
- 2014: Barbados Tridents
- 2015–2018: Middlesex
- 2016–2017: Rajshahi Kings

Career statistics
Competition	Test	ODI	FC	LA
Matches	31	110	206	292
Runs scored	808	1,270	9,780	5,811
Batting average	20.71	23.96	35.56	32.83
100s/50s	1/2	0/4	22/43	4/34
Top score	122*	98*	219	133*
Balls bowled	4,767	3,848	25,509	9,623
Wickets	82	81	479	230
Bowling average	33.97	41.40	28.18	34.43
5 wickets in innings	3	1	14	2
10 wickets in match	0	0	1	0
Best bowling	6/119	5/42	7/14	5/42
Catches/stumpings	12/–	26/–	107/–	94/–
- Source: ESPNcricinfo, 21 July 2018

James Edward Charles Franklin (born 7 November 1980) is a New Zealand cricket coach and former cricketer, who played all forms of the game internationally.

Franklin played as a left-arm medium-fast bowler who swung the ball, and a middle order batsman who hit the ball with power. He began his career as a capable left-handed lower order batsman, but greatly improved his batting during his career. He is one of only two New Zealanders to take a hat-trick in Test cricket, a feat he achieved in October 2004 against Bangladesh.

== Playing career ==
Domestically Franklin played for Wellington. He made his international debut in a One Day International (ODI) against Pakistan in early 2001 aged 20 as a result of a series of injuries to New Zealand's bowlers. He made his Test debut in Auckland against Pakistan later in the year, collecting a pair and taking two wickets. In April 2006, he scored his maiden Test century, making 122 not out in the second Test against South Africa in Cape Town.

In the 2007 Cricket World Cup, Franklin became the first man to take a wicket with the first ball of a match on World Cup debut. He scored two first-class double centuries, both for Wellington against Auckland, making 208 in 2005/06 and 219 in 2008/09.

Franklin played county cricket for Essex, Glamorgan, Gloucestershire, Nottinghamshire and Middlesex. On 6 February 2015, it was announced that James Franklin had signed for Middlesex, initially on a two-year contract, effectively retiring from international cricket. Due to a Northern Irish grandfather from Enniskillen, he was able to play as a domestic player, playing for the side until the end of the 2018 season.

He played in the Indian Premier League for Mumbai Indians, in the Bangladesh Premier League for Rajshahi Kings, in the Australian Big Bash League for Adelaide Strikers and in the Caribbean Premier League for Guyana Amazon Warriors and Barbados Tridents.

== Coaching career ==
In January 2019 Franklin was appointed the head coach of Durham County Cricket Club. After four seasons, in which their high point was reaching the final of the 2021 Royal London One-Day Cup, he stepped down in September 2022. He is currently serving as the bowling coach of Islamabad United in the ongoing PSL 8. He replaced Dale Steyn as the fast bowling coach of the IPL team Sunrisers Hyderabad.

== Personal life ==
He is married and has a son, Charlie Franklin, born on 15 November 2008.

== See also ==
- List of Test cricket hat-tricks
