= List of New Zealand women Test cricketers =

This is a complete list of New Zealand women Test cricketers. A Test match is an international cricket match between two of the leading cricketing nations. This list contains every woman to have played Test cricket for New Zealand. Their first Test match was against England, in February 1935. Their last Test was in 2004 against England. Since the team was formed, 125 women have represented New Zealand in Test cricket.

== Key ==
General

- ‡ – Captain
- † – Wicket-keeper
- Mat – Number of matches played

Batting

- Inn – Number of innings batted
- Runs – Runs scored in career
- HS – Highest score
- Avg – Runs scored per dismissal
- * – Batsman remained not out

Bowling

- Balls – Balls bowled in career
- Wkt – Wickets taken in career
- BBI – Best bowling in an innings
- Ave – Average runs per wicket

Fielding

- Ca – Catches taken
- St – Stumpings effected

== List of Test cricketers ==
Statistics are correct as of New Zealand women's most recent Test match, against England on 21 August 2004.

General					Batting					Bowling					Fielding	
Cap	Name	First	Last	Mat	Runs	HS	Avg	50	100	Balls	Wkt	Best	Avg	5w	Ca	St
1	Marge Bishop	1935	1935	1	27	27	13.50	0	0	48	–	–	–	–	2	–
2	Nancy Browne	1935	1935	1	5	5*	–	0	0	78	–	–	–	–	1	–
3	Hilda Buck	1935	1935	1	16	16	8.00	0	0	–	–	–	–	–	–	–
4	Mabel Corby	1935	1935	1	13	12	6.50	0	0	60	–	–	–	–	–	–
5	Agnes Ell	1935	1935	1	2	1	1.00	0	0	72	–	–	–	–	–	–
6	Merle Hollis	1935	1935	1	26	24	13.00	0	0	108	1	1/81	81.00	–	–	–
7	Margaret Marks	1935	1948	2	30	23	10.00	0	0	–	–	–	–	–	–	–
8	Helen Miller	1935	1935	1	11	11	5.50	0	0	186	1	1/77	77.00	–	–	–
9	Pearl Savin†	1935	1935	1	18	15	9.00	0	0	–	–	–	–	–	–	–
10	Ruth Symons‡	1935	1935	1	5	5	5.00	0	0	120	2	2/71	35.50	–	1	–
11	Peg Taylor	1935	1935	1	3	3	1.50	0	0	96	1	1/62	62.00	–	–	–
12	Phyl Blackler	1948	1966	12	371	68	17.66	1	0	1034	18	4/22	29.27	–	5	–
13	Vera Burt	1948	1969	3	40	15	8.00	0	0	42	–	–	–	–	–	–
14	Vi Farrell†	1948	1954	3	12	5	3.00	0	0	–	–	–	–	–	5	3
15	Joan Francis	1948	1954	5	46	19	7.66	0	0	912	14	4/72	25.85	–	2	–
16	Billie Fulford	1948	1948	1	12	10	6.00	0	0	84	2	2/46	23.00	–	–	–
17	Joan Hatcher	1948	1954	4	79	23	11.28	0	0	–	–	–	–	–	–	–
18	Ina Lamason‡	1948	1954	4	12	37*	21.50	0	0	222	2	2/56	68.00	–	–	–
19	Joy Lamason	1948	1954	4	87	24	10.87	0	0	739	8	4/51	33.00	–	–	–
20	Hilda Thompson	1948	1948	1	17	17*	17.00	0	0	84	0	–	–	–	1	–
21	Una Wickham	1948	1949	2	40	34	10.00	0	0	204	3	2/33	25.33	–	–	–
22	Dot Bailey	1949	1949	1	6	5	3.00	0	0	–	–	–	–	–	–	–
23	Peg Batty	1949	1954	4	67	24	11.16	0	0	198	2	1/18	39.00	–	6	–
24	Esther Blackie†	1949	1949	1	21	13*	21.00	0	0	–	–	–	–	–	3	1
25	Grace Gooder	1949	1949	1	11	11	5.50	0	0	236	8	6/42	9.12	1	–	–
26	Verna Coutts	1954	1957	6	136	41	12.36	0	0	–	–	–	–	–	1	–
27	Rona McKenzie‡	1954	1961	7	295	61	22.69	1	0	570	8	4/18	26.75	–	3	–
28	Eris Paton	1954	1961	4	180	77*	25.71	1	0	416	9	4/35	17.77	–	4	–
29	Joyce Powell†	1954	1961	7	272	63	24.72	1	0	–	–	–	–	–	9	1
30	Mary Rouse	1954	1957	2	18	15*	9.00	0	0	–	–	–	–	–	–	–
31	Betty Sinclair	1954	1961	2	26	10	8.66	0	0	–	–	–	–	–	3	–
32	Jean Coulston	1954	1957	5	76	24	10.85	0	0	1171	19	4/38	17.94	–	3	–
33	Joyce Currie	1954	1957	3	7	3*	2.33	0	0	450	3	3/36	56.66	–	2	–
34	Brenda Duncan	1957	1957	2	1	1*	–	0	0	396	2	1/37	57.50	–	1	–
35	Jean Stonell	1957	1966	4	127	47	15.87	0	0	–	–	–	–	–	2	–
36	Gwen Sutherland	1957	1957	3	66	22	11.00	0	0	288	2	1/29	43.00	–	1	–
37	Betty Thorner	1957	1961	3	76	37	15.20	0	0	240	4	2/33	19.50	–	–	–
38	Mary Webb	1957	1961	4	110	42	13.75	0	0	186	6	3/32	11.00	–	–	–
39	Evon Dickson	1957	1957	2	114	65	28.50	1	0	–	–	–	–	–	–	–
40	Caroline Sinton	1957	1957	1	14	10	7.00	0	0	–	–	–	–	–	–	–
41	Loretta Bayliss	1961	1961	1	–	–	–	0	0	198	5	5/28	14.00	1	–	–
42	Pat Moore	1961	1966	2	80	47	40.00	0	0	54	0	–	–	–	3	–
43	Daphne Robinson	1961	1961	1	2	2*	–	0	0	54	1	1/16	16.00	–	–	–
44	Bev Brentnall†	1966	1972	10	301	84*	21.50	1	0	–	–	–	–	–	16	12
45	Jos Burley	1966	1969	6	110	46	12.22	0	0	1571	21	7/71	26.33	1	3	–
46	Judi Doull	1966	1975	11	779	103	43.27	5	1	78	–	–	–	–	6	–
47	Jackie Lord	1966	1979	15	258	39*	13.57	0	0	3104	55	6/119	19.07	4	5	–
48	Trish McKelvey‡	1966	1979	15	699	155*	29.12	1	2	–	–	–	–	–	8	–
49	Betty Maker	1966	1966	3	10	5	2.50	0	0	384	5	3/34	31.20	–	1	–
50	Carol Oyler	1966	1969	5	212	67*	35.33	1	0	–	–	–	–	–	2	–
51	Jill Saulbrey	1966	1975	11	198	62	16.50	1	0	3623	35	5/32	27.17	1	6	–
52	Janice Stead	1966	1972	9	433	95	27.06	3	0	–	–	–	–	–	3	–
53	Wendy Coe	1966	1969	3	83	34	20.75	0	0	560	6	2/30	37.00	–	–	–
54	Louise Clough	1969	1969	1	–	–	–	0	0	132	1	1/70	70.00	–	–	–
55	Pat Carrick	1969	1977	7	63	21	7.87	0	0	1617	21	6/29	23.28	1	4	–
56	Shirley Cowles	1969	1977	7	324	46	23.14	0	0	48	–	–	–	–	6	–
57	Jenny Olson	1969	1969	1	–	–	–	0	0	114	–	–	–	–	–	–
58	Ann McKenna	1969	1985	7	465	97*	34.76	3	0	6	–	–	–	–	7	–
59	Liz Allan	1972	1977	4	77	29*	43.50	0	0	536	5	3/38	27.60	–	1	–
60	Lynda Prichard	1972	1977	5	188	66	20.88	1	0	18	0	–	–	–	2	–
61	Elaine White	1972	1972	3	33	17	6.60	0	0	326	2	1/5	42.50	–	–	–
62	Ethna Rouse	1972	1972	1	36	35	18.00	0	0	–	–	–	–	–	–	–
63	Carol Marett	1972	1979	7	304	49	33.77	0	0	922	9	2/16	29.77	–	3	–
64	Barbara Bevege	1975	1979	5	400	100*	44.44	2	1	202	0	–	–	–	3	–
65	Maureen Peters	1975	1977	2	5	5	2.50	0	0	456	3	1/5	41.00	–	–	–
66	Sue Rattray	1975	1985	9	412	59	27.46	4	0	1128	19	5/76	24.26	1	1	–
67	Edna Ryan†	1975	1979	5	38	10	9.50	0	0	–	–	–	–	–	3	11
68	Vicki Burtt	1977	1979	4	101	39	12.62	0	0	–	–	–	–	–	5	–
69	Cheryl Henshilwood	1977	1977	1	48	41	24.00	0	0	18	–	–	–	–	–	–
70	Eileen Badham	1979	1979	3	121	42	24.20	0	0	997	10	4/46	27.50	–	7	–
71	Sue Brown	1979	1984	6	59	19	9.83	0	0	1306	9	3/64	48.00	–	1	–
72	Ev Miller	1979	1979	3	92	32	15.33	0	0	–	–	–	–	–	1	–
73	Lesley Murdoch‡	1979	1990	6	253	72	25.30	1	0	–	–	–	–	–	1	–
74	Debbie Hockley‡	1979	1996	19	1301	126*	52.04	7	4	492	5	2/9	29.20	–	9	–
75	Jeanette Dunning	1984	1985	6	320	71	32.00	2	0	390	6	2/16	28.33	–	5	–
76	Linda Fraser	1984	1984	3	–	–	–	0	0	546	4	2/61	52.50	–	–	–
77	Ingrid Jagersma†	1984	1990	9	271	52	33.87	1	0	54	4	4/38	9.50	–	10	2
78	Karen Plummer‡	1984	1992	4	28	13	4.66	0	0	–	–	–	–	–	2	–
79	Liz Signal	1984	1985	6	82	55*	20.50	1	0	606	8	2/34	40.62	–	3	–
80	Rose Signal	1984	1984	1	8	8*	8.00	1	0	54	–	–	–	–	–	–
81	Nicki Turner	1984	1990	6	208	65*	29.71	2	0	–	–	–	–	–	1	–
82	Jackie Clark	1984	1992	11	482	79	26.77	2	0	6	–	–	–	–	7	–
83	Shona Gilchrist	1984	1985	5	12	7*	12.00	0	0	1033	14	3/42	27.42	–	5	–
84	Delwyn Costello	1985	1985	1	–	–	–	0	0	240	2	2/77	52.00	–	–	–
85	Karen Gunn†	1985	1992	9	194	49	16.16	0	0	1903	11	3/40	39.00	–	6	1
86	Lois Simpson	1985	1985	1	6	4	3.00	0	0	–	–	–	–	–	–	–
87	Katrina Molloy	1985	1985	2	1	1*	1.00	0	0	352	5	2/24	18.20	–	2	–
88	Nancy Williams	1985	1992	4	70	35*	17.50	0	0	596	3	2/19	52.66	–	1	–
89	Catherine Campbell	1990	1996	9	55	29	13.75	0	0	2033	18	4/94	40.00	–	2	–
90	Julie Harris	1990	1996	10	26	9	6.50	0	0	1796	15	4/119	46.06	–	1	–
91	Penny Kinsella	1990	1995	6	131	53	16.37	1	0	–	–	–	–	–	3	–
92	Brigit Legg	1990	1990	3	30	26	10.00	0	0	546	4	2/57	37.25	–	–	–
93	Jennifer Turner	1990	1992	6	30	11*	4.28	0	0	1311	19	3/42	24.68	–	2	–
94	Shelley Fruin†	1992	1996	6	188	80	23.50	2	0	–	–	–	–	–	3	1
95	Yvonne Kainuku	1992	1992	1	23	23*	–	0	0	90	1	1/50	50.00	–	–	–
96	Maia Lewis‡	1992	2004	9	252	65	21.00	2	0	–	–	–	–	–	6	–
97	Kim McDonald	1992	1992	1	1	1	1.00	0	0	–	–	–	–	–	–	–
98	Sarah McLauchlan	1992	1996	4	4	4	1.00	0	0	232	2	1/7	41.50	–	1	–
99	Tania Woodbury	1992	1992	2	7	7*	–	0	0	294	4	2/29	25.00	–	–	–
100	Emily Drumm	1992	1996	5	433	161*	144.33	2	2	528	2	1/24	87.50	–	–	–
101	Trudy Anderson	1995	1995	2	108	63	36.00	1	0	–	–	–	–	–	–	–
102	Kirsty Bond	1995	1996	6	473	204	67.57	2	1	–	–	–	–	–	2	–
103	Sarah Illingworth‡†	1995	1996	6	120	40*	30.00	0	0	–	–	–	–	–	5	5
104	Katrina Keenan	1995	1996	5	32	26*	32.00	0	0	903	15	6/73	23.20	1	4	–
105	Clare Nicholson	1995	1996	4	140	46	28.00	0	0	460	5	2/25	34.00	0	1	–
106	Delwyn Brownlee	1995	1995	1	17	12	8.50	0	0	–	–	–	–	–	–	–
107	Justine Russell	1995	1995	1	39	39	39.00	0	0	78	1	1/14	37.00	–	–	–
108	Justine Fryer	1996	1996	3	7	7*	–	0	0	360	5	4/37	30.80	–	1	–
109	Karen Musson	1996	1996	1	–	–	–	0	0	–	–	–	–	–	–	–
110	Kelly Brown	1996	1996	3	52	50*	26.00	1	0	438	7	3/47	22.85	–	4	–
111	Helen Daly	1996	1996	1	–	–	–	0	0	96	–	–	–	–	–	–
112	Anna Smith	1996	1996	1	27	27	27.00	0	0	–	–	–	–	–	1	–
113	Nicola Browne	2003	2004	2	24	23	12.00	0	0	210	1	1/43	83.00	–	2	–
114	Maria Fahey	2003	2004	2	125	60*	41.66	1	0	–	–	–	–	–	1	–
115	Sara McGlashan	2003	2004	2	20	14	10.00	0	0	–	–	–	–	–	–	–
116	Katey Martin†	2003	2003	1	49	46	24.50	0	0	–	–	–	–	–	–	–
117	Louise Milliken	2003	2004	2	10	6	5.00	0	0	198	2	2/49	36.50	–	–	–
118	Kate Pulford	2003	2003	1	–	–	–	0	0	78	2	2/15	7.50	–	1	–
119	Natalee Scripps	2003	2003	1	10	10*	–	0	0	180	–	–	–	–	–	–
120	Rebecca Steele	2003	2004	2	16	12	5.33	0	0	426	8	5/79	17.62	1	3	–
121	Haidee Tiffen	2003	2004	2	124	66*	124.00	1	0	–	–	–	–	–	1	–
122	Aimee Watkins	2003	2004	2	15	14	7.50	0	0	249	3	2/68	35.00	–	2	–
123	Sarah Burke	2004	2004	1	1	1*	–	0	0	114	1	1/57	57.00	–	–	–
124	Paula Flannery	2004	2004	1	64	46	32.00	0	0	6	–	–	–	–	–	–
125	Rebecca Rolls†	2004	2004	1	71	71	71.00	1	0	–	–	–	–	–	1	–
