= Pearl Savin =

New Zealand cricketer

Personal information
- Full name: Pearl Hannah Savin
- Born: 20 June 1914; Christchurch, New Zealand
- Died: 19 November 2000 (aged 86); Auckland, New Zealand
- Batting: Right-handed
- Role: Wicket-keeper

International information
- National side: New Zealand (1935)
- Only Test (cap 9): 16 February 1935 v England

Career statistics
| Competition | WTest |
|---|---|
| Matches | 1 |
| Runs scored | 18 |
| Batting average | 9.00 |
| 100s/50s | 0/0 |
| Top score | 15 |
| Catches/stumpings | 0/0 |
- Source: CricketArchive, 28 November 2021

Pearl Hannah Savin (20 June 1914 – 19 November 2000) was a New Zealand cricketer who played as a wicket-keeper. She played in one Test match for New Zealand, their first, in 1935, the only official match she ever played.
