= Rona McKenzie =

New Zealand cricketer

Rona McKenzie MBE
- Posing during a coin toss in 1957

Personal information
- Full name: Rona Una McKenzie
- Born: 20 August 1922; Takapau, Hawke's Bay, New Zealand
- Died: 24 July 1999 (aged 76); Auckland, New Zealand
- Batting: Right-handed
- Bowling: Right-arm medium
- Role: All-rounder

International information
- National side: New Zealand (1954–1961)
- Test debut (cap 27): 12 June 1954 v England
- Last Test: 17 March 1961 v Australia

Domestic team information
- Years: Team
- 1943/44–1975/76: Auckland

Career statistics
| Competition | WTest | WFC |
|---|---|---|
| Matches | 7 | 125 |
| Runs scored | 295 | 4,984 |
| Batting average | 22.69 | 29.31 |
| 100s/50s | 0/2 | 8/21 |
| Top score | 61 | 141 |
| Balls bowled | 570 | 5,794 |
| Wickets | 8 | 191 |
| Bowling average | 26.75 | 12.87 |
| 5 wickets in innings | 0 | 8 |
| 10 wickets in match | 0 | 0 |
| Best bowling | 4/18 | 6/8 |
| Catches/stumpings | 3/– | 73/– |
- Source: CricketArchive, 27 November 2021

Rona Una McKenzie MBE (20 August 1922 – 24 July 1999) was a New Zealand cricketer, and was the first Maori to captain the New Zealand women's cricket team. She played as an all-rounder, batting right-handed and bowling right-arm medium. She appeared in seven Test matches for New Zealand between 1954 and 1961, captaining in them all. McKenzie's highest score was 61 as she scored 295 runs at an average of 22.69, and she took 8 wickets at 26.75, with a best bowling of 4 for 18. She played domestic cricket for Auckland.

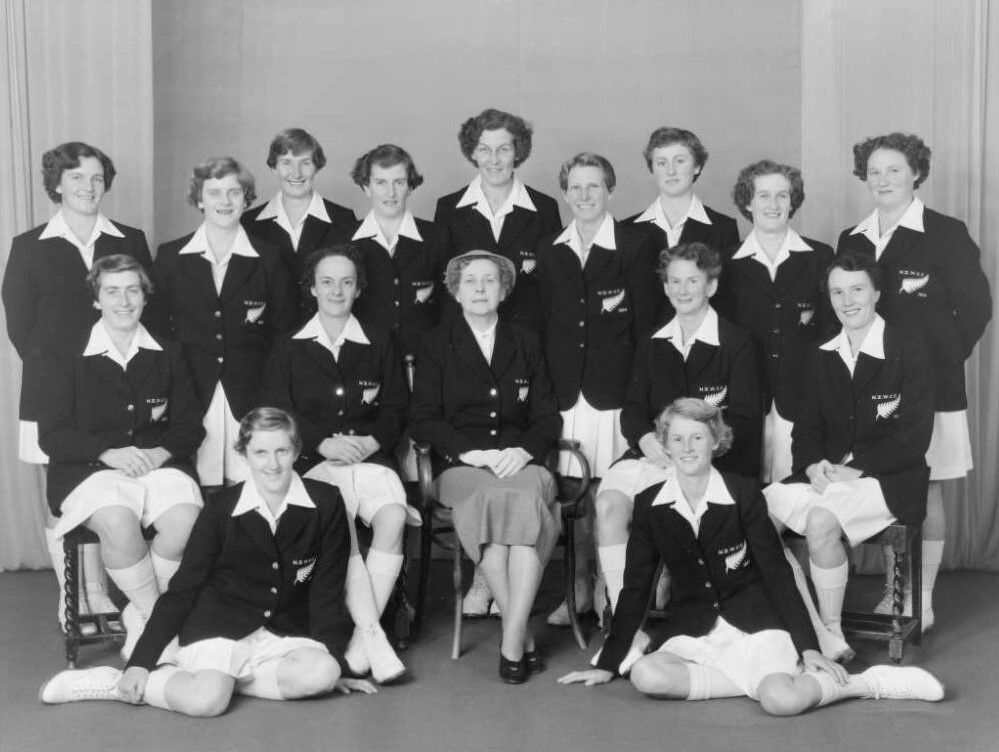
New Zealand women's cricket team, United Kingdom tour of 1954

Her first Test series was on the 1954 tour of England. She played in all three Tests, losing the series one-nil. 1956–57 saw a tour to Australia, and one Test, which was lost. England toured New Zealand in 1957–58 playing two drawn Tests, and Australia visited in 1960–61, when one drawn Test was played.

In the 1975 New Year Honours, McKenzie was appointed a Member of the Order of the British Empire, for services to women's cricket.
