= Jean Stonell =

New Zealand cricketer

Personal information
- Full name: Jean Melva Stonell
- Born: 30 December 1928; Wellington, New Zealand
- Died: 27 July 2008 (aged 79); Wellington, New Zealand
- Batting: Right-handed
- Bowling: Right-arm medium
- Role: Batter

International information
- National side: New Zealand (1957–1966)
- Test debut (cap 35): 18 January 1957 v Australia
- Last Test: 9 July 1966 v England

Domestic team information
- Years: Team
- 1946/47–1967/68: Wellington

Career statistics
Competition	WTest	WFC
Matches	4	66
Runs scored	127	2,197
Batting average	15.87	22.41
100s/50s	0/0	2/10
Top score	47	116*
Balls bowled	–	12
Wickets	–	0
Bowling average	–	–
5 wickets in innings	–	0
10 wickets in match	–	0
Best bowling	–	–
Catches/stumpings	2/–	45/–
- Source: CricketArchive, 26 November 2021

Jean Melva Stonell (30 December 1928 – 27 July 2008) was a New Zealand cricketer who played as a right-handed batter. She appeared in four Test matches for New Zealand between 1957 and 1966. She played domestic cricket for Wellington.
