= Peg Batty =

New Zealand cricketer

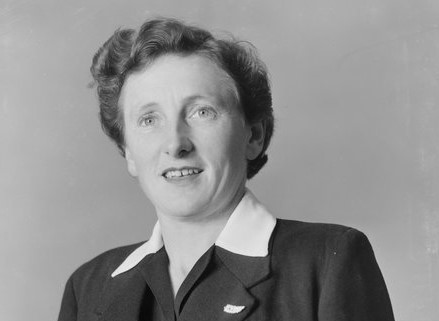
- Batty in 1953

Personal information
- Full name: Kathleen Elaine Batty
- Born: 15 December 1920; Auckland, New Zealand
- Died: 16 December 2008 (aged 88); North Shore, New Zealand
- Batting: Right-handed
- Bowling: Right-arm medium
- Role: Bowler

International information
- National side: New Zealand (1949–1954)
- Test debut (cap 23): 26 March 1949 v England
- Last Test: 24 July 1954 v England

Domestic team information
- Years: Team
- 1939/40–1954/55: Auckland

Career statistics
Competition	WTest	WFC
Matches	4	32
Runs scored	67	742
Batting average	11.16	17.66
100s/50s	0/0	0/3
Top score	24	65
Balls bowled	198	3,422
Wickets	2	89
Bowling average	39.00	14.61
5 wickets in innings	0	6
10 wickets in match	0	2
Best bowling	1/18	6/17
Catches/stumpings	6/–	30/–
- Source: CricketArchive, 27 November 2021

Kathleen Elaine "Peg" Batty (15 December 1920 – 16 December 2008) was a New Zealand cricketer who played primarily as a right-arm medium bowler. She appeared in four Test matches for New Zealand between 1949 and 1954. She played domestic cricket for Auckland.

Batty also represented New Zealand in hockey, captaining the team at the 1953 International Federation of Women’s Hockey Association (IFWHA) tournament in Folkestone, England, with the team winning 16 of 20 games.
