= Brenda Duncan =

New Zealand cricketer

Personal information
- Full name: Brenda Margaret Duncan
- Born: 23 October 1932 (age 94); Gisborne, New Zealand
- Batting: Left-handed
- Bowling: Right-arm medium
- Role: Bowler

International information
- National side: New Zealand (1957)
- Test debut (cap 34): 18 January 1957 v Australia
- Last Test: 29 November 1957 v England

Domestic team information
- Years: Team
- 1954/55–1956/57: Auckland

Career statistics
| Competition | WTest | WFC |
|---|---|---|
| Matches | 2 | 14 |
| Runs scored | 1 | 257 |
| Batting average | – | 21.41 |
| 100s/50s | 0/0 | 0/2 |
| Top score | 1* | 51 |
| Balls bowled | 396 | 2,542 |
| Wickets | 2 | 45 |
| Bowling average | 57.50 | 13.73 |
| 5 wickets in innings | 0 | 2 |
| 10 wickets in match | 0 | 0 |
| Best bowling | 1/37 | 6/42 |
| Catches/stumpings | 1/– | 12/– |
- Source: CricketArchive, 26 November 2021

Brenda Margaret Duncan (born 23 October 1932) is a New Zealand former cricketer who played primarily as a right-arm pace bowler. She appeared in two Test matches for New Zealand in 1957. She played domestic cricket for Auckland.
