= Olive Smith (cricketer) =

Australian cricketer

Ollie Smith
Personal information
- Full name: Olive Smith
- Batting: Right-handed
- Role: wicketkeeper

International information
- National side: Australia
- Test debut (cap 45): 18 January 1957 v New Zealand
- Last Test: 2 January 1969 v England

Career statistics
Competition	WTest
Matches	4
Runs scored	4
Batting average	2.00
100s/50s	0/0
Top score	4
Balls bowled
Wickets
Bowling average
5 wickets in innings	-
10 wickets in match	-
Best bowling	-
Catches/stumpings	6/5
- Source: CricInfo, 4 March 2015

Olive "Ollie" Smith (17 May 1923 in Belmore, New South Wales – 14 February 2014 in Caringbah, New South Wales) was an Australian cricket player. Smith played four test matches for the Australia national women's cricket team.

Smith played her first match for the New South Wales women's cricket team in its 1946/47 season. She was later a sports administrator.
