= Betty Thorner =

New Zealand cricketer (born 1938)

Personal information
- Full name: Betty Irene Thorner
- Born: 23 February 1938 (age 88); Upper Hutt, New Zealand
- Batting: Left-handed
- Bowling: Right-arm medium
- Role: All-rounder

International information
- National side: New Zealand (1957–1961)
- Test debut (cap 37): 18 January 1957 v Australia
- Last Test: 17 March 1961 v Australia

Domestic team information
- Years: Team
- 1954/55–1964/65: Wellington

Career statistics
Competition	WTest	WFC
Matches	3	41
Runs scored	76	1,558
Batting average	15.20	24.73
100s/50s	0/0	1/14
Top score	37	101
Balls bowled	240	4,595
Wickets	4	101
Bowling average	19.50	12.91
5 wickets in innings	0	5
10 wickets in match	0	2
Best bowling	2/33	8/24
Catches/stumpings	0/–	16/–
- Source: CricketArchive, 26 November 2021

Betty Irene Thorner (born 23 February 1938) is a New Zealand former cricketer who played as an all-rounder, batting left-handed and bowling right-arm medium. She appeared in three Test matches for New Zealand between 1957 and 1961. She played domestic cricket for Wellington.

Thorner also represented New Zealand at field hockey. She married Russell Watt, a New Zealand rugby union representative, in Wellington in April 1961.
