= Jack Lamason =

New Zealand cricketer (1905–1961)

- Lamason in 1933

Personal information
- Born: 29 October 1905; Wellington, New Zealand
- Died: 25 June 1961 (aged 55); Wellington, New Zealand
- Batting: Right-handed
- Bowling: Right-arm off-break

Career statistics
Competition	First-class
Matches	60
Runs scored	2,065
Batting average	20.85
100s/50s	2/11
Top score	127
Balls bowled	3,083
Wickets	45
Bowling average	32.80
5 wickets in innings	1
10 wickets in match	0
Best bowling	5/67
Catches/stumpings	61/–
- Source: CricketArchive, 31 October 2022

John Rider Lamason (29 October 1905 – 25 June 1961) was a cricketer who played for Wellington from 1927–28 to 1946–47, and for New Zealand, but not in Test matches.

A hard-hitting middle order batsman and an occasional right-arm off break bowler, Lamason played for seven years for Wellington in the Plunket Shield competition before his first century, 103 against Otago in 1934–35. He captained the side from 1935 to 1936 (when Wellington won the Plunket Shield) to 1937–38. He led Wellington to a 14-run victory over the touring MCC team in 1935–36, when his 62 in the first innings was the highest score of the match.

In the 1934–35 and 1935–36 seasons, he was close to the top of the domestic batting averages, and he was picked for the 1937 New Zealand tour of England. He was not a success: he made only 395 runs on the tour at an average of 15.80 with a top score of 71, and was not chosen for any of the Test matches. He played occasional first-class cricket for almost 10 years after the tour, but his top score in that period was just 31.

Lamason's highest first-class score was 127 for Wellington against Auckland in 1935–36 and his best bowling figures were 5 for 67 (followed by 4 for 109 in the second innings) against Auckland in 1934–35.

Lamason also captained Wellington at Rugby football. He was also a noted lawn bowler and billiards player.

His wife was Ina Lamason, who played cricket and hockey for Wellington and New Zealand. They married in Wellington in December 1938. His sister, Joy Lamason, also played for Wellington and New Zealand.
