= Betty Sinclair (cricketer) =

New Zealand cricketer

Personal information
- Full name: Elizabeth Margaret Sinclair
- Born: 26 May 1933; Dunedin, New Zealand
- Died: 24 February 2009 (aged 75); Dunedin, New Zealand
- Batting: Right-handed
- Role: All-rounder

International information
- National side: New Zealand (1954–1961)
- Test debut (cap 31): 12 June 1954 v England
- Last Test: 17 March 1961 v Australia

Domestic team information
- Years: Team
- 1948/49–1965/66: Otago

Career statistics
Competition	WTest	WFC
Matches	2	53
Runs scored	26	2,211
Batting average	8.66	24.84
100s/50s	0/0	2/9
Top score	10	172
Balls bowled	–	2,635
Wickets	–	54
Bowling average	–	22.48
5 wickets in innings	–	0
10 wickets in match	–	0
Best bowling	–	4/6
Catches/stumpings	3/–	23/–
- Source: CricketArchive, 26 November 2021

Elizabeth Margaret Sinclair (née Butler; 26 May 1933 – 24 February 2009) was a New Zealand cricketer who played as an all-rounder. She appeared in two Test matches for New Zealand between 1954 and 1961. She played domestic cricket for Otago.
