= Helen Miller (cricketer) =

New Zealand cricketer

Personal information
- Full name: Helen Miller
- Born: November 4, 1915; East Taieri, New Zealand
- Died: 10 October 1972 (aged 56)
- Batting: Right-handed
- Bowling: Right-arm medium
- Role: Bowler

International information
- National side: New Zealand (1935)
- Only Test (cap 8): 16 February 1935 v England

Career statistics
Competition	WTest
Matches	1
Runs scored	11
Batting average	5.50
100s/50s	0/0
Top score	11
Balls bowled	186
Wickets	1
Bowling average	77.00
5 wickets in innings	0
10 wickets in match	0
Best bowling	1/77
Catches/stumpings	0/–
- Source: CricketArchive, 28 November 2021

Helen Edith Allan (née Miller; 4 November 1915 – 10 October 1972) was a New Zealand cricketer who played as a right-arm medium bowler. She played one Test match, their first, for New Zealand as Helen Miller in 1935. This was the only official match that she played.

Allan was born in East Taieri, near Dunedin, New Zealand, to orchardists Alexander and Edith Miller, and was educated at Otago Girls' High School. She was a pace bowler, and played for New Zealand against England in 1935. However, a knee injury ended her sporting career.

Allan began studying geology at the University of Otago, but withdrew from her studies following her marriage to Eric Allan in 1939. The couple moved to Hamilton in 1948, and Helen Allan later completed a Bachelor of Arts degree at the University of Waikato and University of Auckland. She went on to teach geography and French and became head of the French department at Sacred Heart Girls' College, Hamilton.

Allan died on 10 October 1972, five days after her husband, and was buried at East Taieri Cemetery.
