= Billie Fulford =

New Zealand cricketer (1914–1987)

Personal information
- Full name: Marjorie Joyce Fulford
- Born: 21 August 1914; Wellington, New Zealand
- Died: 28 May 1987 (aged 72); Wellington, New Zealand
- Batting: Right-handed
- Bowling: Right-arm off break
- Role: Bowler

International information
- National side: New Zealand (1948)
- Only Test (cap 16): 20 March 1948 v Australia

Domestic team information
- Years: Team
- 1935/36–1952/53: Wellington

Career statistics
Competition	WTest	WFC
Matches	1	33
Runs scored	12	711
Batting average	6.00	14.51
100s/50s	0/0	0/1
Top score	6.00	74
Balls bowled	84	3,879
Wickets	2	116
Bowling average	23.00	11.65
5 wickets in innings	0	6
10 wickets in match	0	0
Best bowling	2/46	8/40
Catches/stumpings	0/–	9/–
- Source: CricketArchive, 28 November 2021

Marjorie Joyce "Billie" Fulford (née Holmes; 21 August 1914 – 28 May 1987) was a New Zealand cricketer who played primarily as a right-arm off break bowler. She appeared in one Test match for New Zealand in 1948, against Australia, in which she took 2/46 from 14 overs. She played domestic cricket for Wellington.
