= Val Slater =

Australian cricketer (born 1933)

Personal information
- Full name: Valmai Slater
- Born: 16 January 1933 (age 93); Norman Park, Queensland
- Batting: Left-handed
- Bowling: Right-arm medium; Right-arm off-break

International information
- National side: Australia
- Only Test (cap 43): 18 January 1957 v New Zealand

Career statistics
Competition	Test
Matches	1
Runs scored	9
Batting average	9.00
100s/50s	0/0
Top score	9
Balls bowled	61
Wickets	4
Bowling average	3.25
5 wickets in innings	0
10 wickets in match	0
Best bowling	4/13
Catches/stumpings	2/–
- Source: CricInfo, 2 March 2015

Valmai Slater (born 16 January 1933) is an Australian former cricket player. Slater played her only Test for the Australia national women's cricket team in 1957, against New Zealand.
