= Eris Paton =

New Zealand cricketer

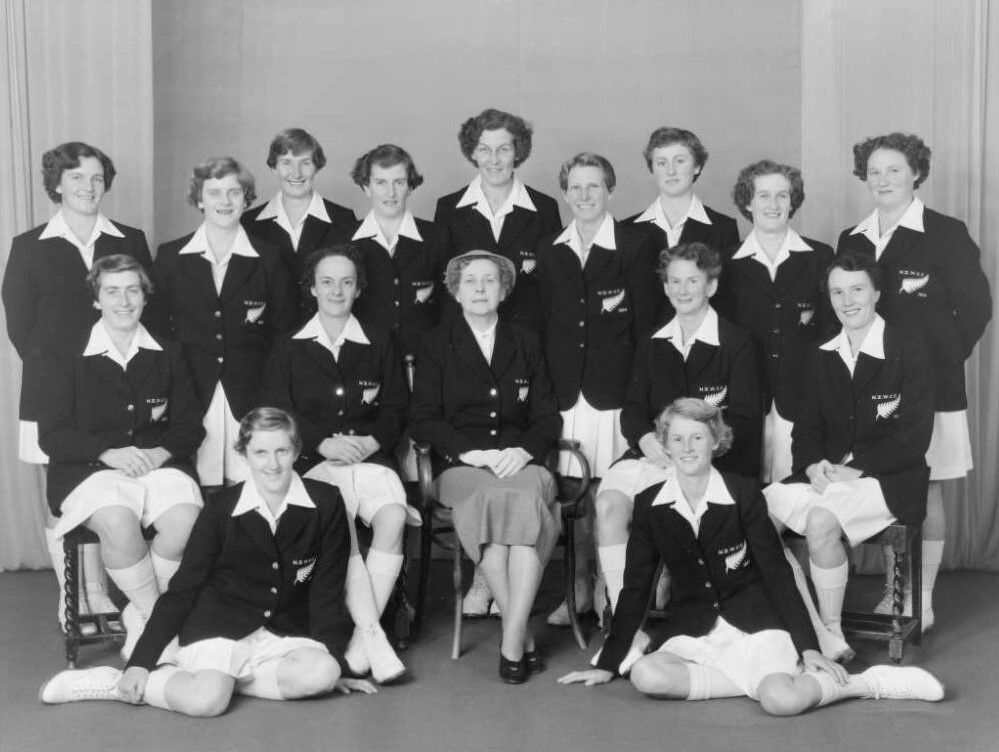

Personal information
- Full name: Eris Annie Paton
- Born: 9 October 1928; Wellington, New Zealand
- Died: 23 November 2004 (aged 76); Invercargill, New Zealand
- Batting: Right-handed
- Bowling: Right-arm medium
- Role: All-rounder

International information
- National side: New Zealand (1954–1961)
- Test debut (cap 28): 12 June 1954 v England
- Last Test: 17 March 1961 v Australia

Domestic team information
- Years: Team
- 1948/49–1964/65: Otago

Career statistics
Competition	WTest	WFC
Matches	4	54
Runs scored	180	2,301
Batting average	25.71	28.06
100s/50s	0/1	3/13
Top score	77*	113
Balls bowled	416	5,708
Wickets	9	145
Bowling average	17.77	14.63
5 wickets in innings	0	7
10 wickets in match	0	0
Best bowling	4/35	6/17
Catches/stumpings	4/–	46/–
- Source: CricketArchive, 27 November 2021

Eris Annie Paton (9 October 1928 – 23 November 2004) was a New Zealand cricketer who played as an all-rounder, batting right-handed and bowling right-arm medium. Having made her Test debut against England in 1954, she appeared in four Test matches for New Zealand between 1954 and 1961. She played domestic cricket for Otago.
