= Hilda Thompson =

New Zealand cricketer

Personal information
- Full name: Hilda Margaret Thompson
- Born: 26 March 1919; Wellington, New Zealand
- Died: 16 June 2004 (aged 85); Melbourne, Australia
- Batting: Left-handed
- Bowling: Left-arm medium
- Role: All-rounder

International information
- National side: New Zealand (1948)
- Only Test (cap 20): 20 March 1948 v Australia

Domestic team information
- Years: Team
- 1944/45–1949/50: Auckland

Career statistics
Competition	WTest	WFC
Matches	1	15
Runs scored	17	815
Batting average	17.00	40.75
100s/50s	0/0	1/7
Top score	17*	102*
Balls bowled	36	1,438
Wickets	0	34
Bowling average	–	15.55
5 wickets in innings	0	1
10 wickets in match	0	0
Best bowling	–	5/29
Catches/stumpings	1/–	16/–
- Source: CricketArchive, 27 November 2021

Hilda Margaret Thompson (26 March 1919 – 16 June 2004) was a New Zealand cricketer who played as an all-rounder, batting left-handed and bowling left-arm medium. She played in one Test match for New Zealand in 1948. She played domestic cricket for Auckland.
