= Joyce Currie =

New Zealand cricketer

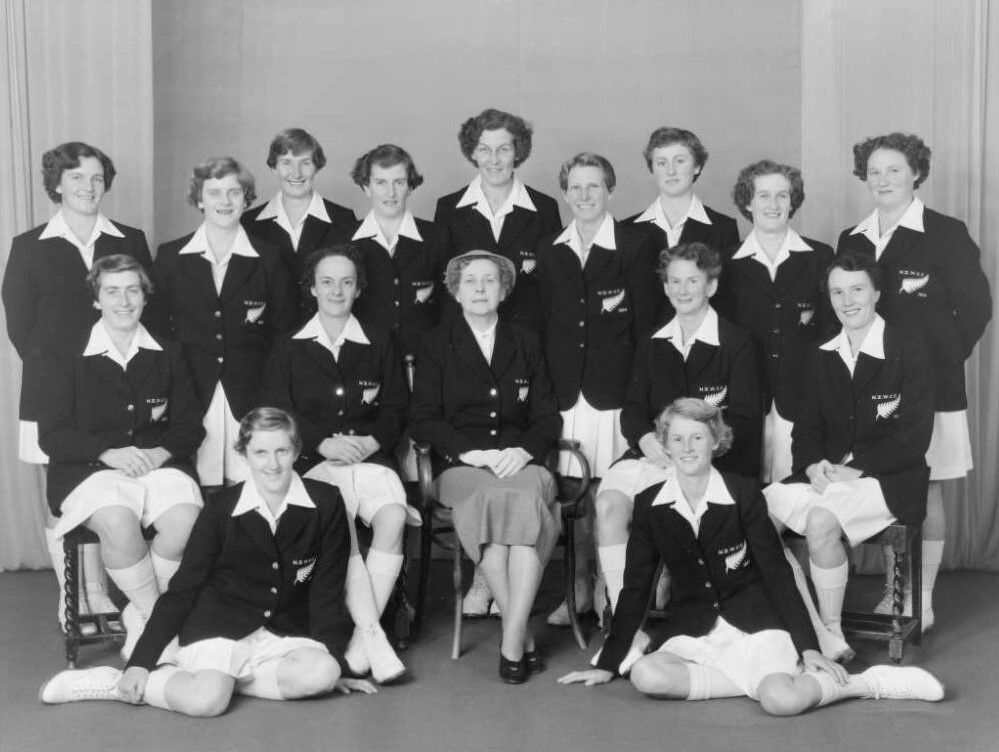

Personal information
- Full name: Margaret Joyce Inness
- Born: 4 November 1931; Christchurch, New Zealand
- Died: 5 October 2012 (aged 80); Wellington, New Zealand
- Batting: Right-handed
- Bowling: Right-arm medium
- Role: Bowler

International information
- National side: New Zealand (1954–1957)
- Test debut (cap 33): 24 July 1954 v England
- Last Test: 27 December 1957 v England

Domestic team information
- Years: Team
- 1951/52–1956/57: Canterbury
- 1957/58–1963/64: Wellington

Career statistics
Competition	WTest	WFC
Matches	3	35
Runs scored	7	438
Batting average	2.33	11.23
100s/50s	0/0	0/1
Top score	3*	53
Balls bowled	450	4,310
Wickets	3	93
Bowling average	56.66	18.36
5 wickets in innings	0	3
10 wickets in match	0	0
Best bowling	3/36	6/22
Catches/stumpings	2/–	12/–
- Source: CricketArchive, 26 November 2021

Margaret Joyce Inness (née Currie; 4 November 1931 – 5 October 2012) was a New Zealand cricketer who played as a right-arm pace bowler. She appeared in three Test matches for New Zealand between 1954 and 1957. Her first and last Test matches, three years apart, were against England. She played domestic cricket for Canterbury and Wellington.
