= Una Wickham =

New Zealand cricketer (1923–1983)

Personal information
- Full name: Una Katherine Wickham
- Born: 12 January 1923; Tauranga, New Zealand
- Died: 20 June 1983 (aged 61); Tauranga, New Zealand
- Batting: Right-handed
- Bowling: Right-arm medium
- Role: All-rounder

International information
- National side: New Zealand (1948–1949)
- Test debut (cap 21): 20 March 1948 v Australia
- Last Test: 26 March 1949 v England

Career statistics
| Competition | WTest | WFC |
|---|---|---|
| Matches | 2 | 11 |
| Runs scored | 40 | 417 |
| Batting average | 10.00 | 24.52 |
| 100s/50s | 0/0 | 1/1 |
| Top score | 34 | 112 |
| Balls bowled | 204 | 1,272 |
| Wickets | 3 | 29 |
| Bowling average | 25.33 | 20.06 |
| 5 wickets in innings | 0 | 0 |
| 10 wickets in match | 0 | 0 |
| Best bowling | 2/33 | 4/35 |
| Catches/stumpings | 0/– | 12/– |
- Source: CricketArchive, 27 November 2021

Una Katherine Wickham (12 January 1923 – 20 June 1983) was a New Zealand cricketer who played as a right-handed batter and right-arm medium bowler. She appeared in two Test matches for New Zealand in 1948 and 1949, scoring 40 runs and taking three wickets. She played domestic cricket for Auckland.
