= Joan Francis =

New Zealand cricketer

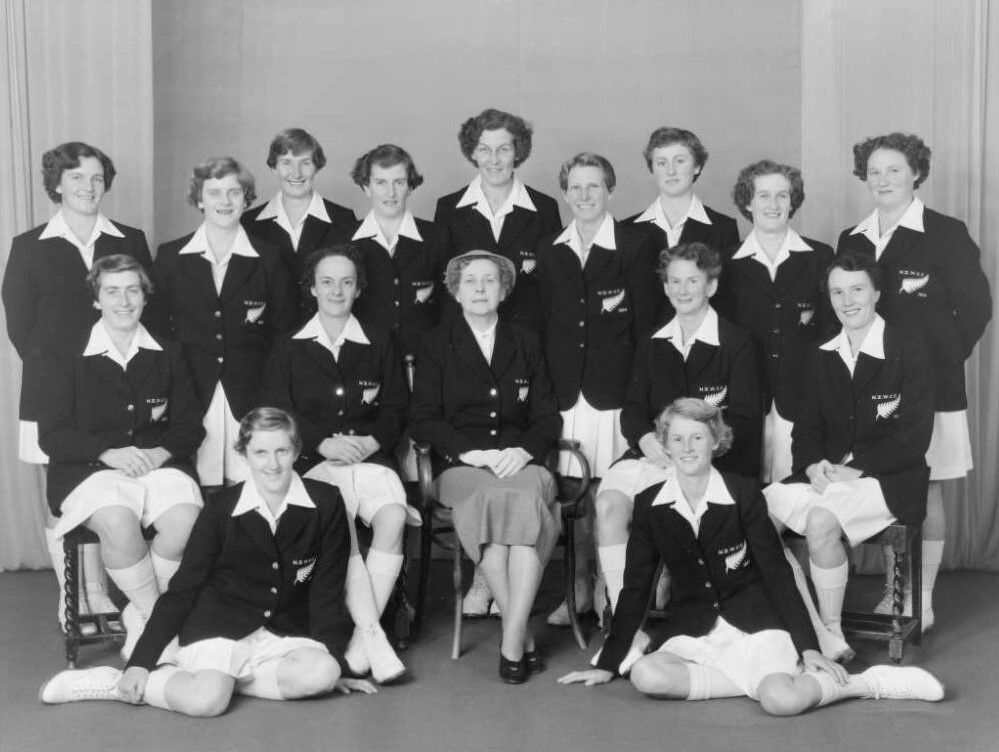

Personal information
- Full name: Joan Winifred Francis
- Born: 9 September 1920; Wellington, New Zealand
- Died: 23 July 1961 (aged 40); Lower Hutt, New Zealand
- Batting: Right-handed
- Bowling: Right-arm medium
- Role: Bowler

International information
- National side: New Zealand (1948–1954)
- Test debut (cap 15): 20 March 1948 v Australia
- Last Test: 24 July 1954 v England

Domestic team information
- Years: Team
- 1939/40–1953/54: Wellington

Career statistics
Competition	WTest	WFC
Matches	5	35
Runs scored	46	639
Batting average	7.66	14.52
100s/50s	0/0	0/4
Top score	19	61
Balls bowled	912	6,211
Wickets	14	146
Bowling average	25.85	13.56
5 wickets in innings	0	5
10 wickets in match	0	1
Best bowling	4/72	6/22
Catches/stumpings	2/–	16/–
- Source: CricketArchive, 28 November 2021

Joan Winifred Francis (née Hudson; 9 September 1920 – 23 July 1961) was a New Zealand cricketer who played primarily as a right-arm medium bowler. She appeared in five Test matches for New Zealand between 1948 and 1954. She played domestic cricket for Wellington.
