= Verna Coutts =

New Zealand cricketer

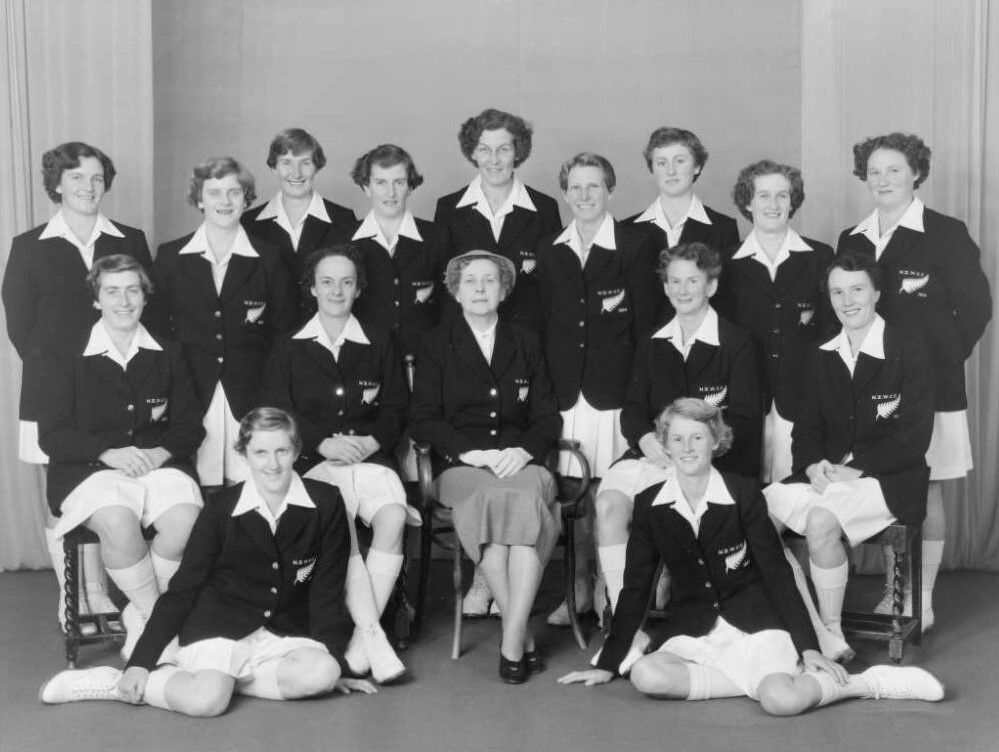

Personal information
- Full name: Verna Reed Coutts
- Born: 13 July 1930; Inglewood, Taranaki, New Zealand
- Died: 31 January 2010 (aged 79); Auckland, New Zealand
- Batting: Right-handed
- Bowling: Right-arm medium
- Role: Batter

International information
- National side: New Zealand (1954–1957)
- Test debut (cap 26): 12 June 1954 v England
- Last Test: 27 December 1957 v England

Domestic team information
- Years: Team
- 1946/47–1953/54: Wellington
- 1954/55–1956/57: Canterbury
- 1957/58–1960/61: Wellington

Career statistics
Competition	WTest	WFC
Matches	6	56
Runs scored	136	2,047
Batting average	12.36	26.93
100s/50s	0/0	3/10
Top score	41	137*
Balls bowled	–	353
Wickets	–	7
Bowling average	–	22.50
5 wickets in innings	–	0
10 wickets in match	–	0
Best bowling	–	2/15
Catches/stumpings	1/–	14/–
- Source: CricketArchive, 27 November 2021

Verna Reed Coutts (13 July 1930 – 31 January 2010) was a New Zealand cricketer who played as a right-handed batter. Making her Test debut against England, she appeared in six Test matches for New Zealand between 1954 and 1957. She played domestic cricket for Wellington and Canterbury.
