= Joyce Powell =

New Zealand cricketer

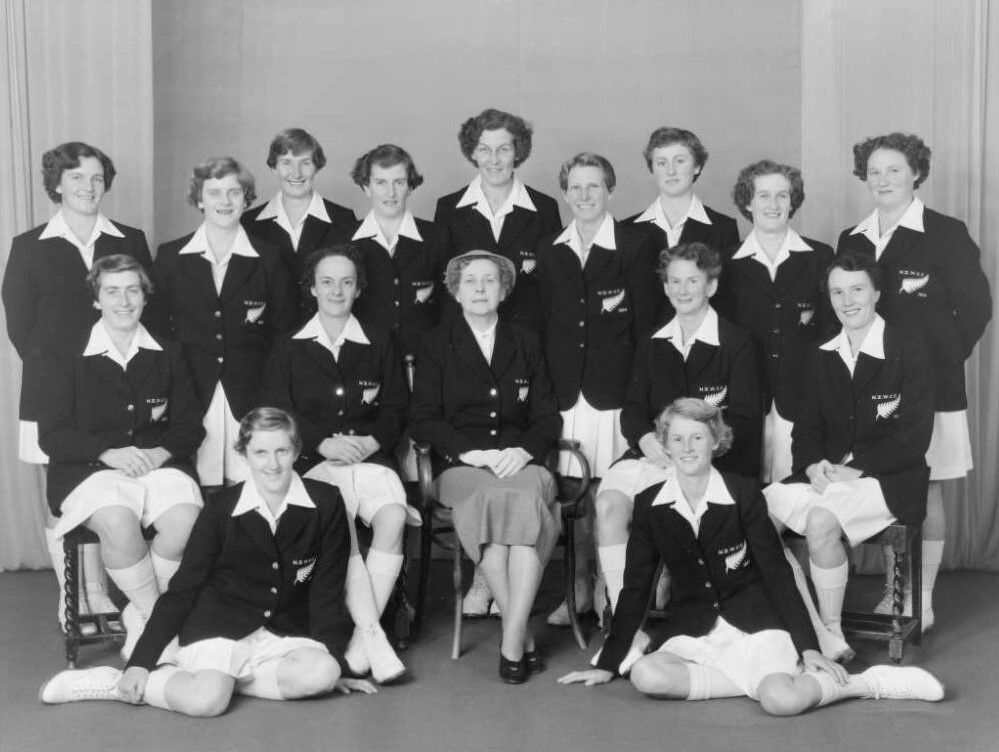

Personal information
- Full name: Ivy Joyce Powell
- Born: 25 May 1922; Matamata, New Zealand
- Died: 14 June 2003 (aged 81); Auckland, New Zealand
- Batting: Right-handed
- Role: Wicket-keeper

International information
- National side: New Zealand
- Test debut (cap 29): 12 June 1954 v England
- Last Test: 17 March 1961 v Australia

Domestic team information
- Years: Team
- 1945/46–1960/61: Auckland

Career statistics
Competition	WTest	WFC
Matches	7	63
Runs scored	272	2,620
Batting average	24.72	29.43
100s/50s	0/1	1/18
Top score	63	153*
Balls bowled	–	114
Wickets	–	1
Bowling average	–	42.00
5 wickets in innings	–	0
10 wickets in match	–	0
Best bowling	–	1/9
Catches/stumpings	9/1	34/31
- Source: CricketArchive, 27 November 2021

Ivy Joyce Powell (née Clothier; 25 May 1922 – 14 June 2003) was a New Zealand cricketer who played as a wicket-keeper and right-handed batter. She appeared in seven Test matches for New Zealand between 1954 and 1961. She played domestic cricket for Auckland for 15 years.
