= Joan Hatcher =

New Zealand cricketer

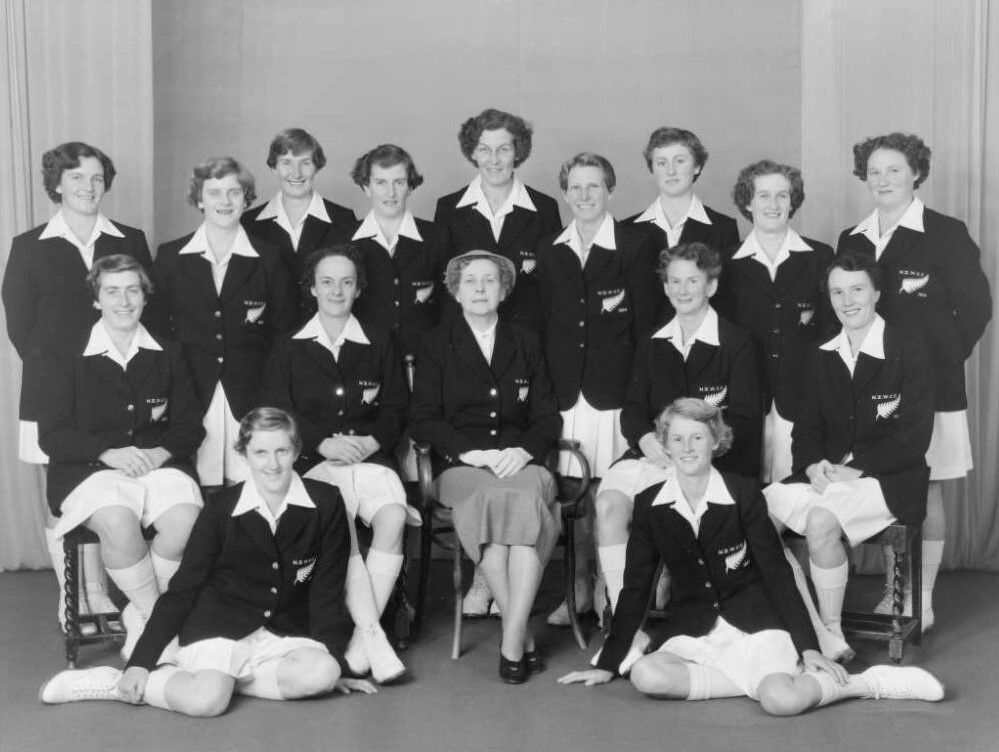

Personal information
- Full name: Joan Constance Hatcher
- Born: 4 November 1923; Wellington, New Zealand
- Died: 24 September 2006 (aged 82); Wellington, New Zealand
- Batting: Right-handed
- Bowling: Right-arm medium
- Role: Batter
- Relatives: Dot Bailey (sister)

International information
- National side: New Zealand (1948–1954)
- Test debut (cap 17): 20 March 1948 v Australia
- Last Test: 24 July 1954 v England

Domestic team information
- Years: Team
- 1943/44–1958/59: Wellington

Career statistics
| Competition | WTest | WFC |
|---|---|---|
| Matches | 4 | 42 |
| Runs scored | 79 | 1,585 |
| Batting average | 11.28 | 24.38 |
| 100s/50s | 0/0 | 2/10 |
| Top score | 23 | 123 |
| Balls bowled | – | 140 |
| Wickets | – | 3 |
| Bowling average | – | 21.66 |
| 5 wickets in innings | – | 0 |
| 10 wickets in match | – | 0 |
| Best bowling | – | 2/13 |
| Catches/stumpings | 0/– | 13/– |
- Source: CricketArchive, 28 November 2021

Joan Constance Hatcher (4 November 1923 – 24 September 2006) was a New Zealand cricketer who played as a right-handed batter. She appeared in four Test matches for New Zealand between 1948 and 1954. She played domestic cricket for Wellington.
