= Jean Coulston =

New Zealand cricketer

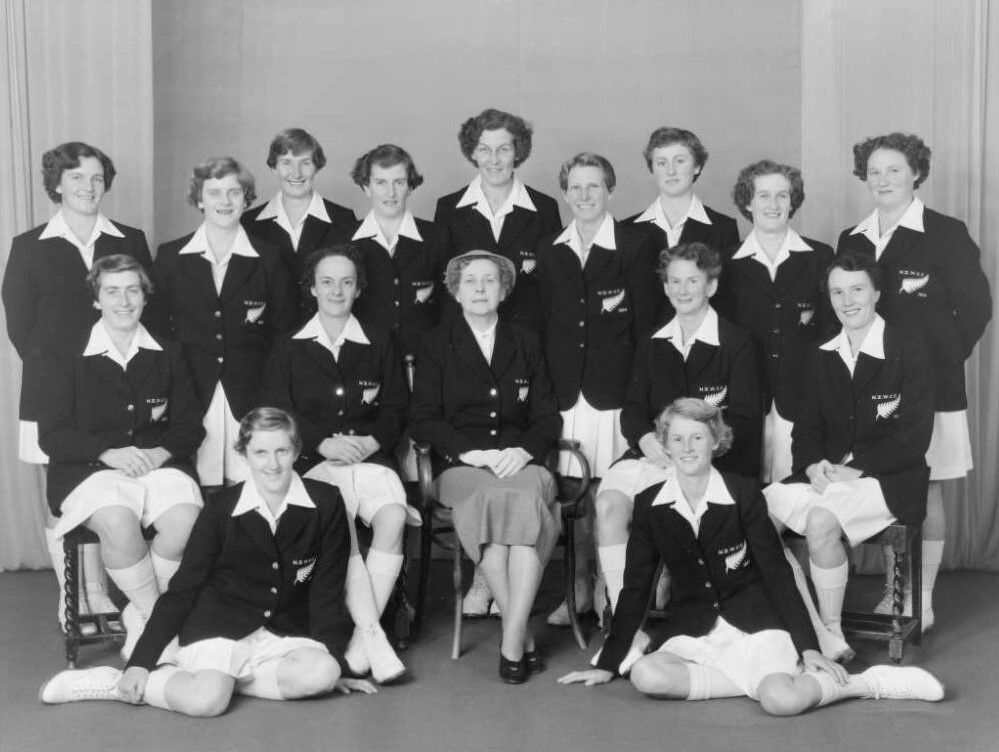

Personal information
- Full name: Jean Marie Coulston
- Born: 8 October 1934; Petone, New Zealand
- Died: 30 January 2001 (aged 66); Lower Hutt, New Zealand
- Batting: Left-handed
- Bowling: Right arm medium
- Role: Bowler
- Relatives: James Franklin (nephew)

International information
- National side: New Zealand (1954–1957)
- Test debut (cap 32): 3 July 1954 v England
- Last Test: 27 December 1957 v England

Domestic team information
- Years: Team
- 1952/53–1957/58: Wellington

Career statistics
Competition	WTest	WFC
Matches	5	29
Runs scored	76	536
Batting average	10.85	14.48
100s/50s	0/0	0/1
Top score	24	52*
Balls bowled	1,171	4,382
Wickets	19	89
Bowling average	17.94	13.54
5 wickets in innings	0	4
10 wickets in match	0	1
Best bowling	4/38	7/24
Catches/stumpings	3/–	15/–
- Source: CricketArchive, 26 November 2021

Jean Marie Coulston (8 October 1934 – 30 January 2001) was a New Zealand cricketer who played primarily as a right-arm medium bowler. Her Test match debut was against England in 1954. She appeared in five Test matches for New Zealand between 1954 and 1957. She played domestic cricket for Wellington.
