= Vi Farrell =

New Zealand cricketer

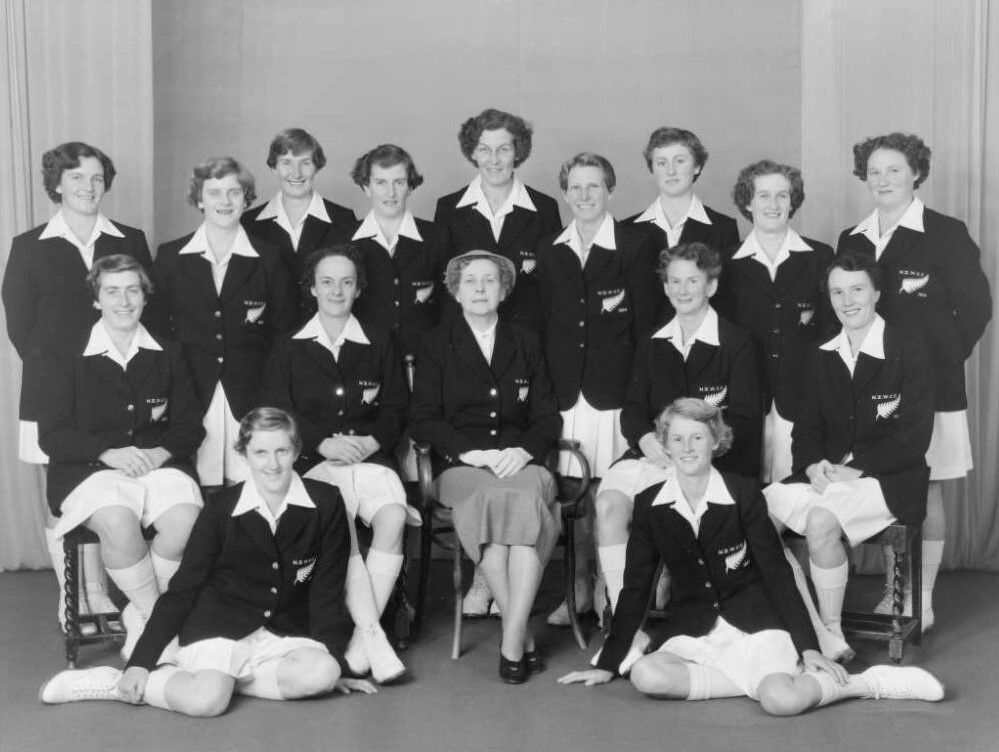

Personal information
- Full name: Violet Helen Maude Farrell
- Born: 20 August 1913; Islington, Middlesex, England
- Died: 22 April 1989 (aged 75); Wellington, New Zealand
- Batting: Right-handed
- Role: Wicket-keeper

International information
- National side: New Zealand (1948–1954)
- Test debut (cap 14): 20 March 1948 v Australia
- Last Test: 24 July 1954 v England

Domestic team information
- Years: Team
- 1935/36–1953/54: Wellington

Career statistics
Competition	WTest	WFC
Matches	3	29
Runs scored	12	165
Batting average	3.00	8.25
100s/50s	0/0	0/0
Top score	5	21*
Catches/stumpings	5/3	38/23
- Source: CricketArchive, 28 November 2021

Violet Helen Maude Farrell (née Taylor; 20 August 1913 – 22 April 1989) was an English-born cricketer who represented New Zealand as a wicket-keeper. She played in three Test matches for New Zealand between 1948 and 1954 and also played domestic cricket for Wellington.
