= Mary Rouse =

New Zealand cricketer

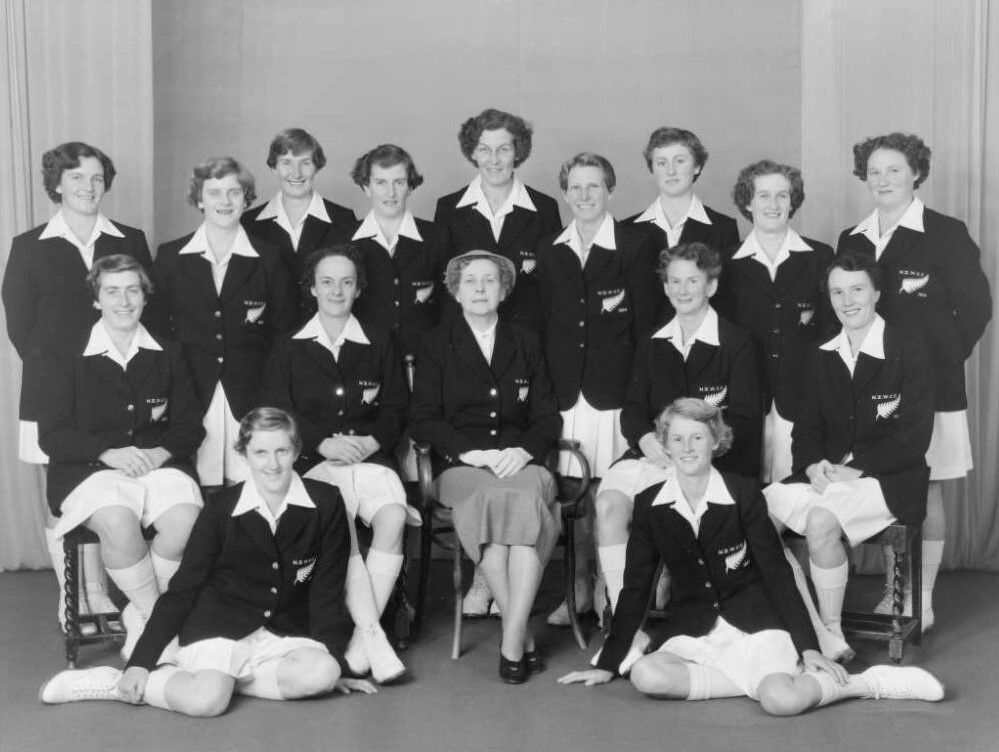

Personal information
- Full name: Mary Turns Rouse
- Born: 11 January 1926; Waipara, New Zealand
- Died: 27 January 1993 (aged 67); Christchurch, New Zealand
- Batting: Right-handed
- Role: Batter
- Relatives: Ethna Rouse (sister-in-law)

International information
- National side: New Zealand (1954–1957)
- Test debut (cap 30): 12 June 1954 v England
- Last Test: 18 January 1957 v Australia

Domestic team information
- Years: Team
- 1947/48–1959/60: Canterbury

Career statistics
Competition	WTest	WFC
Matches	2	41
Runs scored	18	910
Batting average	9.00	19.78
100s/50s	0/0	0/4
Top score	15*	58
Balls bowled	–	210
Wickets	–	2
Bowling average	–	55.00
5 wickets in innings	–	0
10 wickets in match	–	0
Best bowling	–	1/26
Catches/stumpings	0/–	11/–
- Source: CricketArchive, 27 November 2021

Mary Turns McGregor (née Rouse; 11 January 1926 – 27 January 1993) was a New Zealand cricketer who played as a right-handed batter. She appeared in two Test matches for New Zealand between 1954 and 1957. She played domestic cricket for Canterbury.
