= Ina Lamason =

New Zealand cricketer

Ina Lamason MBE
- Lamason in 1951

Personal information
- Full name: Ina Mabel Lamason
- Born: 2 May 1911; Palmerston North, New Zealand
- Died: 30 April 1994 (aged 82); Auckland, New Zealand
- Batting: Right-handed
- Bowling: Right-arm off break
- Role: All-rounder
- Relatives: Jack Lamason (husband); Joy Lamason (sister-in-law)

International information
- National side: New Zealand (1948–1954)
- Test debut (cap 18): 20 March 1948 v Australia
- Last Test: 24 July 1954 v England

Domestic team information
- Years: Team
- 1935/36–1961/62: Wellington

Career statistics
Competition	WTest	WFC
Matches	4	70
Runs scored	86	2,299
Batting average	21.50	29.47
100s/50s	0/0	1/13
Top score	37*	104*
Balls bowled	222	5,427
Wickets	2	146
Bowling average	68.00	15.15
5 wickets in innings	0	1
10 wickets in match	0	0
Best bowling	2/23	5/9
Catches/stumpings	0/–	30/–
- Source: CricketArchive, 27 November 2021

Ina Mabel Lamason MBE (née Pickering; 2 May 1911 – 30 April 1994) was a New Zealand cricket and field hockey player. She was also an international hockey umpire, cricket and hockey administrator, and sports journalist.

== Biography ==
Lamason was born in Palmerston North in 1911. A right-arm off break bowler and right-handed batter, she played in four Test matches in 1947–48 and 1954, captaining New Zealand in two. All her games were against England, and she was never on the winning side, losing both the games she captained. She was the vice captain of the New Zealand team that played its first Test match in 1934-35 but had to withdraw from the match with a pulled leg muscle. She captained the side that toured Australia (no Test matches) in 1938. She played domestic cricket for Wellington. Lamason also represented New Zealand at hockey.

Lamason died in Auckland in 1994.

== Awards and honours ==
In the 1989 Queen's Birthday Honours, Lamason was appointed a Member of the Order of the British Empire, for services to cricket and hockey.

== Family ==
Her husband was Jack Lamason, who played cricket for New Zealand on the 1937 tour of England, but did not play in any of the Tests. They married in Wellington in December 1938.

Her sister-in-law Joy Lamason was a Test cricketer. Ina Lamason managed the New Zealand tour to England in 1966. Joy was the manager and Ina the assistant manager of the team that took part in the first Women's Cricket World Cup in England in 1973.
