= Joy Lamason =

New Zealand cricketer

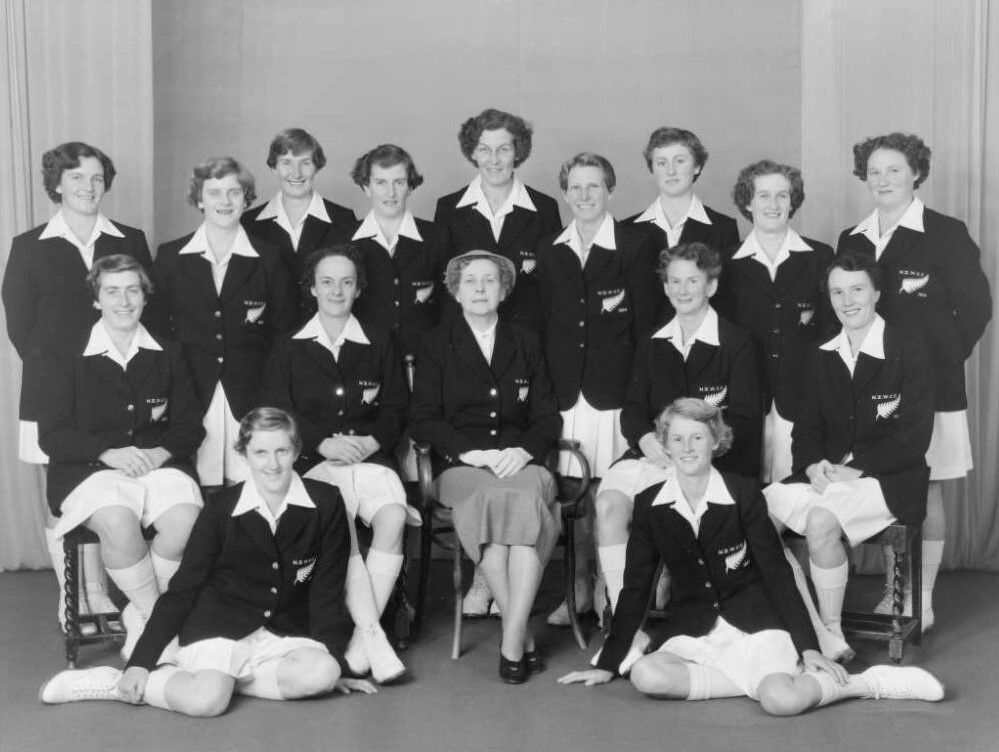

Personal information
- Full name: Joyce Grace Lamason
- Born: 19 December 1915; Auckland, New Zealand
- Died: 16 February 2012 (aged 96); Porirua, New Zealand
- Batting: Right-handed
- Bowling: Right-arm medium
- Role: All-rounder
- Relatives: Jack Lamason (brother-in-law); Ina Lamason (sister-in-law)

International information
- National side: New Zealand (1948–1954)
- Test debut (cap 19): 20 March 1948 v Australia
- Last Test: 3 July 1954 v England

Domestic team information
- Years: Team
- 1935/36–1956/57: Wellington

Career statistics
Competition	WTest	WFC
Matches	4	44
Runs scored	87	1,294
Batting average	10.87	18.48
100s/50s	0/0	1/5
Top score	24	122
Balls bowled	739	5,934
Wickets	8	118
Bowling average	33.00	16.05
5 wickets in innings	0	2
10 wickets in match	0	0
Best bowling	4/51	7/3
Catches/stumpings	0/–	26/–
- Source: CricketArchive, 27 November 2021

Joyce Grace Lamason (née Stenberg; 19 December 1915 – 16 February 2012) was a New Zealand cricketer who played as an all-rounder, batting right-handed and bowling right-arm medium. She appeared in four Test matches for New Zealand between 1948 and 1954. She played domestic cricket for Wellington.

She was the sister-in-law of Jack Lamason and Ina Lamason.
