= Phyl Blackler =

New Zealand cricketer

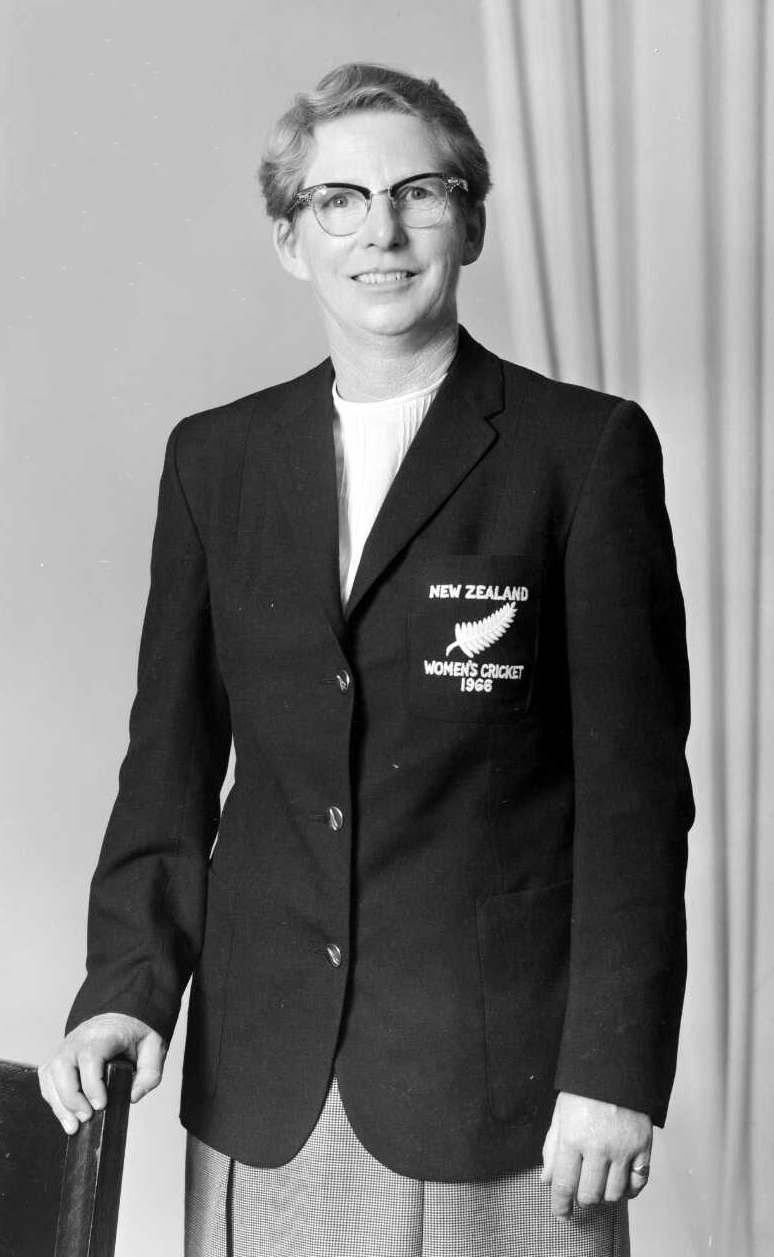
- Blackler in 1966

Personal information
- Full name: Phyllis Blackler
- Born: 13 June 1919; Christchurch, New Zealand
- Died: 25 May 1975 (aged 55); Christchurch, New Zealand
- Batting: Right-handed
- Bowling: Right-arm leg break
- Role: All-rounder

International information
- National side: New Zealand (1948–1966)
- Test debut (cap 12): 20 March 1948 v Australia
- Last Test: 6 August 1966 v England

Domestic team information
- Years: Team
- 1938/39–1957/58: Canterbury
- 1958/59–1959/60: Wellington
- 1960/61–1968/69: Canterbury

Career statistics
Competition	WTest	WFC
Matches	12	92
Runs scored	371	4,469
Batting average	17.66	39.93
100s/50s	0/1	7/21
Top score	68	202
Balls bowled	1,034	9,311
Wickets	18	376
Bowling average	29.27	11.94
5 wickets in innings	0	31
10 wickets in match	0	7
Best bowling	4/22	8/24
Catches/stumpings	5/–	50/–
- Source: CricketArchive, 28 November 2021

Phyllis Blackler (13 June 1919 – 25 May 1975) was a New Zealand cricketer who played as an all-rounder, batting right-handed and bowling right-arm leg break. Making her Test debut against Australia, she appeared in twelve Test matches for New Zealand between 1948 and 1966. She played domestic cricket for Canterbury and Wellington.

Blackler holds the record for being the oldest women's test cricketer, being 47 years and 54 days old in her last match versus England in 1966.
