= Archery at the 2028 Summer Olympics – Qualification =

Archery qualification at the 2028 Los Angeles Olympics

This article provides details about the qualifying phase for Archery at the 2028 Summer Olympics to be held in Los Angeles, United States. The competition will feature 128 archers, evenly divided between men and women, with 64 archers per gender. Each National Olympic Committee (NOC) can enter up to eight archers, with four archers for each gender. Compound archery will make its Olympic debut through the mixed team compound event. NOCs that qualify for a gender-based team in the recurve category can select three members to form their squad. NOCs that qualify to compete in the compound events can enter one male and one female archer. Each selected recurve member must also compete in the individual recurve event.

== Timeline ==
Event	Venue	Dates
2026 Asian Games	(Japan) Okazaki	26 September – 3 October 2026
2027 European Games	(Turkey) Istanbul	16–27 June 2027
2027 Pacific Games	(French Polynesia) Pīraʻe	24 July – 8 August 2027
2027 Pan American Games	(Peru) Lima	4–8 August 2027
2027 World Archery Championships	(Colombia) Medellín	16–22 August 2027
2027 African Games	(Egypt) Cairo	27 August – 10 September 2027

== Qualification Summary ==
Nation	RM		RW		RX	CX	Total	
Nation	Individual	Team	Individual	Team	Team	Team	Quotas	Athletes
China					Yes		1	TBD
India			1			Yes	2	TBD
Japan	1						1	TBD
South Korea	1		1				2	TBD

== Recurve qualification ==
=== Men's events ===
Event	Location	Archers per NOC	Total places	Qualified NOC
Men's team – 8 teams, 24 male archers
Host nation	—N/a	3	3	United States
2027 World Archery Championships	(Colombia) Medellin	3	9	
2027 Asian Archery Championships	(China) Hangzhou	3	3	
2028 Pan American Archery Championships	(Mexico) Tijuana	3	3	
2028 European Archery Championships	(United Kingdom) Nottingham	3	3	
Final Team Qualification Tournament	TBD	3	3	
Mixed team – 5 teams, 5 male archers
2026 Asian Games	(Japan) Okazaki	1	1	China
2027 African Games	Egypt	1	1	
2027 European Games	(Turkey) Istanbul	1	1	
2027 Pacific Games	(French Polynesia) Tahiti	1	1	
2027 Pan American Games	(Peru) Lima	1	1	
Men's individual – 23 male archers
2026 Asian Games	(Japan) Okazaki	1	2	South Korea; Japan

=== Women's events ===
Event	Location	Archers per NOC	Total places	Qualified NOC
Women's team – 8 teams, 24 female archers
Host nation	—N/a	3	3	United States
2027 World Archery Championships	(Colombia) Medellin	3	9	
2027 Asian Archery Championships	(China) Hangzhou	3	3	
2028 Pan American Archery Championships	(Mexico) Tijuana	3	3	
2028 European Archery Championships	(United Kingdom) Nottingham	3	3	
Final Team Qualification Tournament	TBD	3	3	
Mixed team – 5 teams, 5 female archers
2026 Asian Games	(Japan) Okazaki	1	1	China
2027 African Games	Egypt	1	1	
2027 European Games	(Turkey) Istanbul	1	1	
2027 Pacific Games	(French Polynesia) Tahiti	1	1	
2027 Pan American Games	(Peru) Lima	1	1	
Women's individual – 23 female archers
2026 Asian Games	(Japan) Okazaki	1	2	India; South Korea

== Compound qualification ==
Event	Location	Archers per NOC	Total places	Qualified NOC
Mixed team – 12 teams, 24 archers (12 male and 12 female)
Host nation	—N/a	2	2	United States
2027 World Archery Championships	(Colombia) Medellin	2	6	
2026 Asian Games	(Japan) Okazaki	2	2	India
2027 African Games	Egypt	2	2	
2027 European Games	(Turkey) Istanbul	2	2	
2027 Pacific Games	(French Polynesia) Tahiti	2	2	
2027 Pan American Games	(Peru) Lima	2	2	
Final Team Qualification Tournament	TBD	2	2	
Mixed Team World Ranking List	—N/a	2	4	
