= Triathlon at the 2028 Summer Olympics – Qualification =

This article details the qualifying phase for triathlon at the 2028 Summer Olympics. The competition at these Games will comprise a total of 110 athletes coming from their respective National Olympic Committees (NOCs) with a maximum of three per gender. All athletes must undergo a qualifying pathway to earn a spot for the Games through the World Triathlon Mixed Relay Championships (2026 and 2027), the Continental Qualification, the Olympic Qualification List which begins on 18 May 2024 and then concludes two years later on the same date, and the World Ranking from the same time period.

== Summary ==
Ten NOCs will each earn four quota spots (two per gender) through the mixed relay qualification pathway. As the host country, the United States reserves four quota places (two per gender) while the highest-ranked eligible NOC will each obtain two men's and two women's spots at the 2026 and 2027 Mixed Relay World Championships. The eight highest-ranked NOCs will be allocated the same number of places based on the World Triathlon mixed relay Olympic rankings of 18 May 2028, ensuring continental representation if there is a NOC from a continent not yet qualified within the top 15.

The individual Olympic rankings of 18 May 2028 will provide 21 athletes in each gender with the coveted quota places, sequentially allocated to the highest-ranked triathletes, subject to a limit of three per NOC (if all three are placed inside the top 30) or two per NOC (if the third would be placed outside the top 30). Any NOC qualifying through the mixed relay must ignore its two highest-ranked triathletes in each gender. Two spots per gender are awarded to the triathletes under the Tripartite Commission and to those eligible in the top 160 of the World Triathlon individual rankings. One spot per continent will be assigned through the continental games to the highest-ranked remaining triathlete whose NOC has not yet qualified for any quota places. The same process will be applied through the World Triathlon individual rankings. A team consisting of two individuals in both the men's and women's events will be eligible to join the ten previously qualified teams in the mixed relay event.

NOC	Men	Women	Mixed	Total
China		1		1
France	2	2	Yes	4
Japan	1			1
United States	2	2	Yes	4
Total: 4 NOCs	5	5	2	10

== Timeline ==
Event	Date	Venue
2026 World Triathlon Mixed Relay Championships	July 12, 2026	(Germany) Hamburg
2026 Asian Games	September 20–21, 2026	(Japan) Gamagōri
2027 African Games	January 20–February 7, 2027	(Egypt) Cairo
2027 European Games	June 16–27, 2027	(Turkey) Istanbul
2027 Pacific Games	July 26–29, 2027	(French Polynesia) Pīraʻe
2027 Pan American Games	August 5–7, 2027	(Peru) Lima
2027 World Triathlon Mixed Relay Championships	June 2027	(Italy) Rome
Mixed Relay Olympic Qualification Ranking	May 18, 2028	—
Individual Olympic Qualification Rankings	May 18, 2028	—
Individual World Triathlon Rankings	May 18, 2028	—

== Men's ==
Event	Places	Qualified NOC	Selected triathlete
Host nation	2	United States	
2026 World Triathlon Mixed Relay Championships	2	France	
2027 World Triathlon Mixed Relay Championships	2		
Mixed Relay Qualification Rankings	16		
Individual Olympic Rankings	21		
Tripartite Commission	2		
2027 African Games	1		
2027 Pan American Games	1		
2026 Asian Games	1	Japan	
2027 European Games	1		
2027 Pacific Games	1		
Individual World Triathlon Rankings – Africa	1		
Individual World Triathlon Rankings – America	1		
Individual World Triathlon Rankings – Asia	1		
Individual World Triathlon Rankings – Europe	1		
Individual World Triathlon Rankings – Oceania	1		
Total	55		

== Women's ==
Event	Places	Qualified NOC	Selected triathlete
Host nation	2	United States	
2026 World Triathlon Mixed Relay Championships	2	France	
2027 World Triathlon Mixed Relay Championships	2		
Mixed Relay Qualification Rankings	16		
Individual Olympic Rankings	21		
Tripartite Commission	2		
2027 African Games	1		
2027 Pan American Games	1		
2026 Asian Games	1	China	
2027 European Games	1		
2027 Pacific Games	1		
Individual World Triathlon Rankings – Africa	1		
Individual World Triathlon Rankings – America	1		
Individual World Triathlon Rankings – Asia	1		
Individual World Triathlon Rankings – Europe	1		
Individual World Triathlon Rankings – Oceania	1		
Total	55		
