= 2026 ISSF World Shooting Championships =

International sport shooting competition

2026 World Shooting Championships
- Venue: Lusail Shooting Complex
- Location: Doha, Qatar
- Dates: 1–14 November 2026
- Competitors: 1,041

The 2026 World Shooting Championships was the 55th edition of the World Shooting Championships organised by the International Shooting Sport Federation, which was held from 1 to 14 November 2026 in Doha, the capital city of Qatar. The championships was serving as the qualification tournament for the 2028 Summer Olympics.

== Medalists ==
=== Pistol ===
Event	Gold	Silver	Bronze
Men's 10 metre air pistol	Hu Kai; China	Jaypal Malviya; India	Jindřich Dubový; Czech Republic
Men's 25 metre centre fire pistol	Ernests Erbs; Latvia	Ankur Goel; India	Jindřich Dubový; Czech Republic
Men's 25 metre rapid fire pistol	Florian Peter; Germany	Clément Bessaguet; France	Jean Quiquampoix; France
Men's 25 metre standard pistol	Kévin Chapon; France	Pavlo Korostylov; Ukraine	Sampo Voutilainen; Finland
Men's 50 metre pistol	Anton Aristarkhov; Individual Neutral Athletes	Ravinder Singh; India	Luca Joldea; Romania
Women's 10 metre air pistol	Jiang Ranxin; China	Yao Qianxun; China	Veronika Major; Hungary
Women's 25 metre pistol	Yang Ji-in; South Korea	Trịnh Thu Vinh; Vietnam	Zhang Yueyue; China
Women's 25 metre standard pistol	Xiao Jiaruixuan; China	Veronika Major; Hungary	Niveditha Nair; India
Women's 50 metre pistol	Şevval İlayda Tarhan; Turkey	Elmira Karapetyan; Armenia	Irina Yunusmetova; Kazakhstan
Men's 10 metre air pistol team	China (CHN); Bu Shuaihang; Hu Kai; Xie Yu	South Korea (KOR); Choe Bo-ram; Park Jeong-yi; So Seung-seob	Uzbekistan (UZB); Mukhammad Kamalov; Sodikjon Abdullaev; Vladimir Svechnikov
Men's 25 metre centre fire pistol team	Ukraine (UKR); Volodymyr Pasternak; Pavlo Korostylov; Maksym Horodynets	South Korea (KOR); Hong Suk-jin; So Seung-seob; Lee Gun-hyeok	India (IND); Ankur Goel; Amanpreet Singh; Rajkanwar Singh Sandhu
Men's 25 metre rapid fire pistol team	France (FRA); Arnaud Gamaleri; Clément Bessaguet; Jean Quiquampoix	Germany (GER); Emanuel Müller; Florian Peter; Oliver Geis	China (CHN); He Shiyu; Su Lianbofan; Yang Yuhao
Men's 25 metre standard pistol team	Latvia (LAT); Lauris Strautmanis; Emīls Vasermanis; Ernests Erbs	South Korea (KOR); Lee Gun-hyeok; Hong Suk-jin; So Seung-seob	Ukraine (UKR); Pavlo Korostylov; Maksym Horodynets; Volodymyr Pasternak
Men's 50 metre pistol team	India (IND); Amanpreet Singh; Ravinder Singh; Saurabh Chaudhary	China (CHN); Feng Linlang; Lyu Junyi; Zhang Bingchen	South Korea (KOR); Choe Bo-ram; Hong Su-hyeon; So Seung-seob
Women's 10 metre air pistol team	China (CHN); Jiang Ranxin; Shen Yiyao; Yao Qianxun	India (IND); Manu Bhaker; Sainyam Vij; Suruchi Singh	South Korea (KOR); Choo Ga-eun; Oh Ye-jin; Yang Ji-in
Women's 25 metre pistol team	India (IND); Divya T. S. Esha Singh; Manu Bhaker	South Korea (KOR); Nam Da-jung; Oh Ye-jin; Yang Ji-in	Vietnam (VIE); Thuy Dung Nguyen; Nguyen Thuy Trang; Trịnh Thu Vinh
Women's 25 metre standard pistol team	China (CHN); Xiao Jiaruixuan; Zhang Yueyue; Shang Kaiyan	India (IND); Niveditha Nair; Manvi Jain; Simranpreet Kaur Brar	Hungary (HUN); Veronika Major; Domsits Olívia Ditta; Fabian Sara Rahel
Mixed 10 metre air pistol team	China (CHN); Shen Yiyao; Bu Shuaihang	Iran (IRI); Hanieh Rostamian; Vahid Golkhandan	China (CHN); Yao Qianxun; Hu Kai

=== Rifle ===
Event	Gold	Silver	Bronze
Men's 10 metre air rifle	Sheng Lihao; China	Ma Sihan; China	Miran Maričić; Croatia
Men's 50 metre rifle three positions	Dmitrii Pimenov; Individual Neutral Athletes	Patrik Jány; Slovakia	Niraj Kumar; India
Men's 50 metre rifle prone	Patrik Jány; Slovakia	István Péni; Hungary	Zhang Changhong; China
Women's 10 metre air rifle	Ban Hyo-jin; South Korea	Han Jiayu; China	Wang Zifei; China
Women's 50 metre rifle three positions	Aleksandra Stojadinović; Serbia	Oh Se-hee; South Korea	Misaki Nobata; Japan
Women's 50 metre rifle prone	Caroline Lund; Norway	Stephanie Grundsøe; Denmark	Seonaid McIntosh; Great Britain
Men's 10 metre air rifle team	China (CHN); Ma Sihan; Sheng Lihao; Zhang Changhong	Croatia (CRO); Petar Gorša; Miran Maričić; Josip Sikavica	Norway (NOR); Jon-Hermann Hegg; Henrik Larsen; Jens Oestli
Men's 50 metre rifle three positions team	Czech Republic (CZE); Jiří Přívratský; Filip Nepejchal; Petr Nymburský	Norway (NOR); Henrik Larsen; Ole Martin Halvorsen; Jon-Hermann Hegg	India (IND); Aishwary Pratap Singh Tomar; Akhil Sheoran; Niraj Kumar
Men's 50 metre rifle prone team	Switzerland (SUI); Christoph Dürr; Fabio Wyrsch; Jan Lochbihler	Czech Republic (CZE); Petr Nymburský; Filip Nepejchal; Jiří Přívratský	Serbia (SRB); Milenko Sebić; Lazar Kovačević; Marko Ivanović
Women's 10 metre air rifle team	China (CHN); Du Yuchen; Han Jiayu; Wang Zifei	India (IND); Elavenil Valarivan; Shambhavi Kshirsagar; Sonam Maskar	Japan (JPN); Rio Miura; Misaki Nobata; Hinata Taichi
Women's 50 metre rifle three positions team	Norway (NOR); Caroline Lund; Synnoeve Berg; Jeanette Hegg Duestad	Switzerland (SUI); Vivien Jäggi; Chiara Leone; Emely Jäggi	Czech Republic (CZE); Adéla Zrůstová; Katerina Štefánková; Veronika Blažíčková
Women's 50 metre rifle prone team	Switzerland (SUI); Chiara Leone; Emely Jäggi; Vivien Jäggi	Norway (NOR); Caroline Lund; Jeanette Hegg Duestad; Synnoeve Berg	Denmark (DEN); Betina Petersen; Rikke Ibsen; Stephanie Grundsøe
Mixed 10 metre air rifle team	China (CHN); Wang Zifei; Sheng Lihao	China (CHN); Du Yuchen; Zhang Changhong	South Korea (KOR); Ban Hyo-jin; Park Ha-jun

=== Shotgun ===
Event	Gold	Silver	Bronze
Men's skeet	Jesper Hansen; Denmark	Azmy Mehelba; Egypt	Abdulaziz Al-Saad; Kuwait
Men's trap	Abdulrahman Al-Faihan; Kuwait	Vivaan Kapoor; India	Qi Ying; China
Women's skeet	Jiang Yiting; China	Che Yufei; China	Jiang Chaoyu; China
Women's trap	Jessica Rossi; Italy	Adriana Ruano; Guatemala	Daria Semianova; Individual Neutral Athletes
Men's skeet team	Czech Republic (CZE); Tomáš Nýdrle; Daniel Korčák; Jakub Tomeček	Finland (FIN); Timi Vallioniemi; Eetu Kallioinen; Tommi Takanen	Turkey (TUR); Muhammet Seyhun Kaya; Salih Oday; Serhat Mustafa Şahin
Men's trap team	Kuwait (KUW); Abdulrahman Al-Faihan; Talal Al-Rashidi; Khaled Al-Mudhaf	Poland (POL); Wolodymyr Yazykov; Alan Łapiński; Tomasz Pasierbski	Czech Republic (CZE); Jiří Lipták; David Kostelecký; Pavel Vaněk
Women's skeet team	China (CHN); Jiang Chaoyu; Jiang Yiting; Che Yufei	Great Britain (GBR); Amber Rutter; Bethany Norton; Madeleine Russell	Italy (ITA); Diana Bacosi; Martina Bartolomei; Sara Bongini
Women's trap team	Italy (ITA); Jessica Rossi; Erica Sessa; Silvana Stanco	Czech Republic (CZE); Zina Hrdličková; Martina Matějková; Tereza Závišková	Turkey (TUR); Rümeysa Pelin Kaya; Safiye Sarıtürk Temizdemir; Nihan Gürer
Mixed skeet team	Finland (FIN); Eetu Kallioinen; Marjut Heinonen	Peru (PER); Nicolas Pacheco Espinosa; Daniella Borda Olaechea	China (CHN); Lyu Jianlin; Jiang Yiting
Mixed trap team	Italy (ITA); Jessica Rossi; Massimo Fabbrizi	Great Britain (GBR); Lucy Hall; Nathan Hales	Turkey (TUR); Rümeysa Pelin Kaya; Nedim Tolga Tuncer

== Medal table ==
* Host nation (Qatar)

Rank	Nation	Gold	Silver	Bronze	Total
1	China (CHN)	13	6	8	27
2	Italy (ITA)	3	0	1	4
3	India (IND)	2	7	4	13
4	South Korea (KOR)	2	5	3	10
5	Czech Republic (CZE)	2	2	4	8
6	Norway (NOR)	2	2	1	5
7	France (FRA)	2	1	1	4
8	Switzerland (SUI)	2	1	0	3
9	Individual Neutral Athletes (AIN)	2	0	1	3
9	Kuwait (KUW)	2	0	1	3
11	Latvia (LAT)	2	0	0	2
12	Denmark (DEN)	1	1	1	3
12	Finland (FIN)	1	1	1	3
12	Ukraine (UKR)	1	1	1	3
15	Germany (GER)	1	1	0	2
15	Slovakia (SVK)	1	1	0	2
17	Turkey (TUR)	1	0	3	4
18	Serbia (SRB)	1	0	1	2
19	Hungary (HUN)	0	2	2	4
20	Great Britain (GBR)	0	2	1	3
21	Croatia (CRO)	0	1	1	2
21	Vietnam (VIE)	0	1	1	2
23	Armenia (ARM)	0	1	0	1
23	Egypt (EGY)	0	1	0	1
23	Guatemala (GUA)	0	1	0	1
23	Iran (IRI)	0	1	0	1
23	Peru (PER)	0	1	0	1
23	Poland (POL)	0	1	0	1
29	Japan (JPN)	0	0	2	2
30	Kazakhstan (KAZ)	0	0	1	1
30	Romania (ROU)	0	0	1	1
30	Uzbekistan (UZB)	0	0	1	1
Totals (32 entries)		41	41	41	123

== Participating nations ==
A total of 90 National Olympic Committees (NOCs) was participating in this edition.

- (Individual Neutral Athletes) Authorised Neutral Athletes (33)
- Algeria (7)
- Angola (3)
- Armenia (3)
- Australia (11)
- Austria (18)
- Azerbaijan (16)
- Bangladesh (8)
- Belgium (6)
- Bosnia and Herzegovina (2)
- Brazil (7)
- Bahrain (4)
- Bulgaria (5)
- Canada (6)
- Chile (6)
- China (38)
- Chinese Taipei (22)
- Croatia (16)
- Cyprus (10)
- Czech Republic (26)
- Denmark (7)
- Dominican Republic (6)
- Ecuador (2)
- Egypt (16)
- Spain (15)
- Estonia (10)
- Finland (15)
- France (28)
- United Kingdom (18)
- Georgia (4)
- Germany (31)
- Greece (11)
- Guatemala (11)
- Hong Kong (5)
- Hungary (17)
- Indonesia (10)
- India (54)
- Iran (7)
- Ireland (5)
- Iceland (5)
- Israel (2)
- Italy (28)
- Jordan (6)
- Japan (25)
- Kazakhstan (30)
- Kyrgyzstan (10)
- Kuwait (21)
- Latvia (8)
- Lebanon (4)
- Lithuania (2)
- Luxembourg (2)
- Morocco (5)
- Malaysia (11)
- Mexico (10)
- North Macedonia (1)
- Montenegro (5)
- Netherlands (6)
- Norway (15)
- New Zealand (4)
- Oman (8)
- Pakistan (11)
- Peru (6)
- Philippines (13)
- Poland (14)
- Portugal (10)
- Puerto Rico (4)
- Qatar (21) [Host]
- Romania (3)
- San Marino (2)
- Saudi Arabia (12)
- Senegal (1)
- Serbia (13)
- Singapore (1)
- South Africa (3)
- South Korea (38)
- Slovakia (20)
- Slovenia (4)
- Sri Lanka (11)
- Switzerland (11)
- Sweden (15)
- Syria (3)
- Tajikistan (5)
- Thailand (18)
- Turkey (26)
- United Arab Emirates (16)
- Ukraine (23)
- United States (12)
- Uzbekistan (15)
- Venezuela (2)
- Vietnam (14)
- Yemen (1)

== Olympic qualification ==
The 2026 edition was the first qualification event, offering 36 Olympic quota places for the 2028 Summer Olympics.

Event	Quotas	Quota Holders	Event	Quotas	Quota Holders
10m Air Pistol Men	3	China; India; Czech Republic	10m Air Pistol Women	3	China; Hungary; Iran
25m Rapid Fire Pistol Men	3	Germany; France; Czech Republic	25m Pistol Women	3	South Korea; Vietnam; China
10m Air Rifle Men	3	China; Croatia; Slovakia	10m Air Rifle Women	3	South Korea; China; France
50m Rifle 3 Positions Men	3	Russia; India; Norway	50m Rifle 3 Positions Women	3	Serbia; South Korea; Japan
Skeet Men	3	Denmark; Egypt; Kuwait	Skeet Women	3	China; Slovakia; Kazakhstan
Trap Men	3	Kuwait; India; China	Trap Women	3	Italy; Guatemala; Russia
