= Empire Classic =

Annual early season collegiate basketball tournament

- Formerly: Atlantic City Shootout (1995); Coaches vs. Cancer Classic (1996–2011); 2K Sports Classic (2012–2019)
- Sport: College basketball
- Founded: 1995
- No. of teams: 2
- Country: United States
- Venue: Madison Square Garden
- Most titles: Duke Blue Devils
- Broadcaster: ESPN
- Sponsor: Saatva
- Website: empireclassic.net

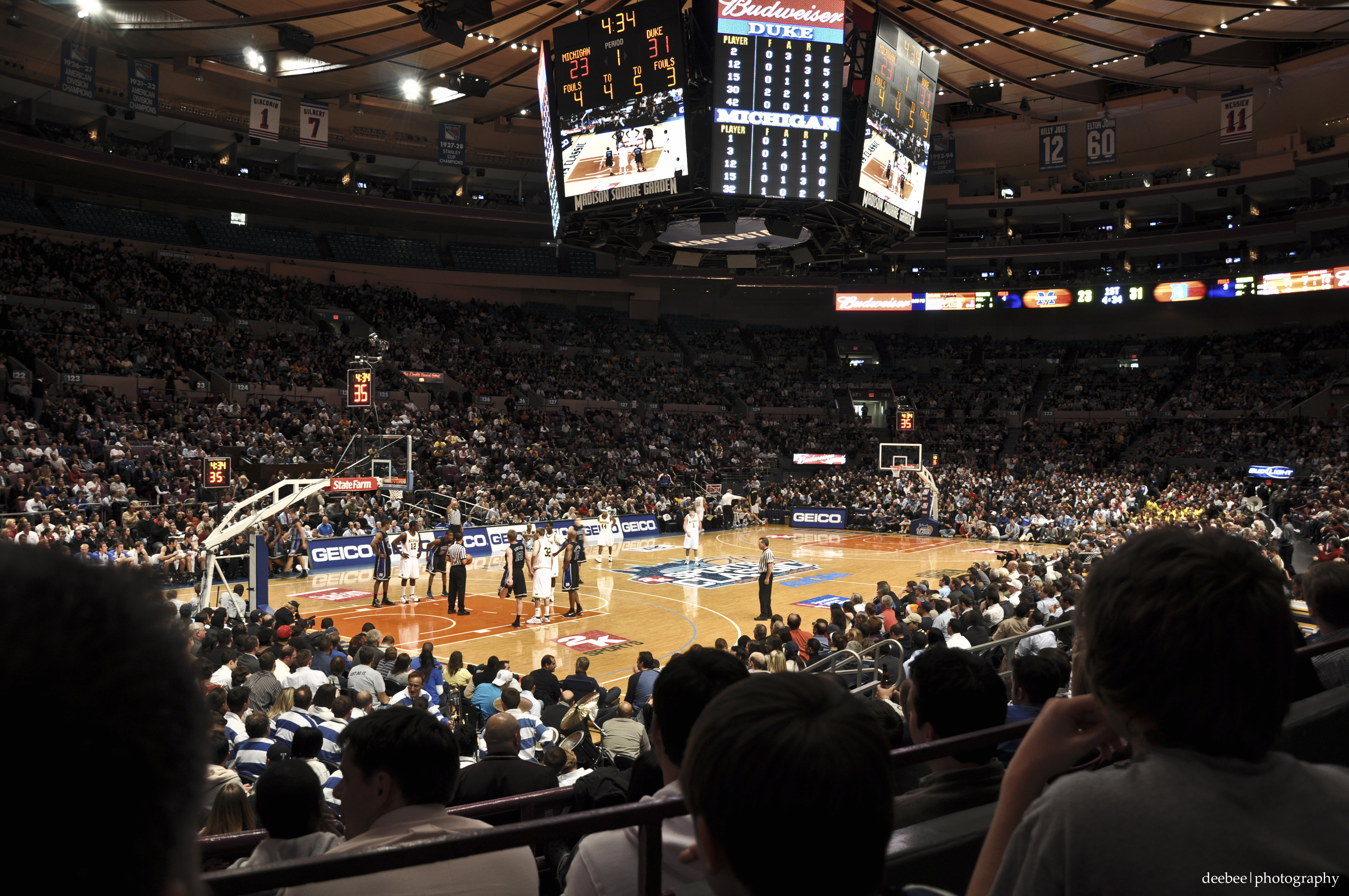
A 2K Sports Classic game in 2008

The Empire Classic is an annual college basketball event played in November at the beginning of the season and televised by ESPN. Originally known as the Atlantic City Shootout and produced by the Gazelle Group, Inc., the event was first played in 1995. The following year, it became the Coaches vs. Cancer Classic as a collaboration between the National Association of Basketball Coaches and the American Cancer Society in an effort to raise funds for cancer research. In 2012, the tournament beneficiary became Wounded Warrior Project, resulting in the tournament being renamed the 2K Sports Classic. (A new annual college basketball tournament benefiting cancer research, also called the Coaches vs. Cancer Classic and hosted by the Barclays Center in Brooklyn, New York, was held from 2012 to 2014.) In 2019, the 2K Sports Classic was renamed the 2K Empire Classic Benefiting Wounded Warrior Project, commonly referred to as the "Empire Classic".

== History ==
The first two events were doubleheader showcases held at the Atlantic City Convention Center (now Boardwalk Hall). From 1997 through 2001, the event was played as a tournament. Princeton won the first tournament in 1997, which took place at Continental Airlines Arena in the New Jersey Meadowlands.

In 1998, the event moved to Madison Square Garden in New York City, where it remained through 2019. In both 2002 and 2003, it was played as a showcase doubleheader. In 2004, it became a tournament again, with a new format as a 16-team event with teams from 16 separate conferences. Four predetermined regional round hosts played two games at home and the winners play in the semifinals and finals at Madison Square Garden. Syracuse won the first tournament played in this format, beating Memphis, 77–62, in 2004.

In 2007, Gardner–Webb unexpectedly won at Kentucky, 84–68, and advanced to the semifinals at Madison Square Garden, preventing one of the tournament's marquee teams from playing there. To ensure that the marquee teams would play in the semifinals in the 2008 tournament, the semifinalists were predetermined, regardless of the results of the regional rounds. Beginning in 2009, the format was revised to a 12-team field and each team was guaranteed four games in the tournament, with the semifinalists advancing to Madison Square Garden and the remaining eight teams being split into two subregional tournaments played at predetermined campus sites.

In 2014, the tournament format changed again, with eight teams from eight separate conferences invited to the tournament. Two games were held at four different regional sites selected before the tournament. The semifinals and finals were held at Madison Square Garden and the remaining four teams played in a tournament format at a predetermined on-campus site. This format persisted through 2019.

With the COVID-19 pandemic raging in the United States during the 2020–21 NCAA Division I men's basketball season, the Empire Classic was one of the very few multiteam events held during the fall of 2020. With no fans permitted to attend, it took place behind closed doors at Mohegan Sun Arena in Uncasville, Connecticut. Only four teams participated. Baylor withdrew from it after head coach Scott Drew tested positive for COVID-19; Rhode Island replaced Baylor.

In 2021, the tournament format was dropped, and the Empire Classic took place as a showcase event at T-Mobile Arena on the Las Vegas Strip in Las Vegas, Nevada. Four teams participated, and the event consisted of two doubleheaders played over the course of two days,

The 2024 Empire Classic returned to a showcase format, with Maryland defeating Villanova 76–75 at Prudential Center in Newark, New Jersey. The 2025 Empire Classic continues with the format, with UCLA facing California at Chase Center in San Francisco, California, along with campus site games featuring Sacramento State and Presbyterian.

=== Yearly champions, runners-up, and MVPs ===
Year	Winner	Score	Opponent	Tournament MVP	Other participants	Venue
2025	Showcase format – no tournament					Chase Center, San Francisco, CA
2024	Showcase format – no tournament					Prudential Center, Newark, NJ
2023	UConn	81–71	Texas	Tristen Newton, UConn	Indiana, Louisville	Madison Square Garden, New York, NY
2022	St. John's	76–69	Syracuse	André Curbelo, St. John's	Richmond, Temple	Barclays Center, Brooklyn, NY
2021	Showcase format – no tournament					T-Mobile Arena, Las Vegas, NV
2020^{1}	Villanova	83–74	Arizona State	Jeremiah Robinson-Earl, Villanova	Boston College, Rhode Island	Mohegan Sun Arena, Uncasville, CT
2019	Duke	81–73	Georgetown	Vernon Carey Jr., Duke	Texas, California	Madison Square Garden, New York, NY
2018	Iowa	91–72	Connecticut	Luka Garza, Iowa	Syracuse, Oregon	Madison Square Garden, New York, NY
2017	Providence	90–63	Saint Louis	Kyron Cartwright, Providence	Virginia Tech, Washington	Madison Square Garden, New York, NY
2016	Michigan	76–54	SMU	Zak Irvin, Michigan	Pittsburgh, Marquette	Madison Square Garden, New York, NY
2015	Duke	86–84	Georgetown	Grayson Allen, Duke	Wisconsin, VCU	Madison Square Garden, New York, NY
2014	Texas	71–55	California	Jonathan Holmes, Texas	Syracuse, Iowa	Madison Square Garden, New York, NY
2013	Connecticut	59–58	Indiana	Shabazz Napier, Connecticut	Boston College, Washington	Madison Square Garden, New York, NY
2012	Alabama	77–55	Villanova	Trevor Releford, Alabama	Oregon State, Purdue	Madison Square Garden, New York, NY
2011	Mississippi State	67–57	Arizona	Arnett Moultrie, Mississippi State	St. John's, Texas A&M	Madison Square Garden, New York, NY
2010	Pittsburgh	68–66	Texas	Ashton Gibbs, Pittsburgh	Illinois, Maryland	Madison Square Garden, New York, NY
2009	Syracuse	87–71	North Carolina	Wesley Johnson, Syracuse	California, Ohio State	Madison Square Garden, New York, NY
2008	Duke	71–56	Michigan	Kyle Singler, Duke	UCLA, Southern Illinois	Madison Square Garden, New York, NY
2007	Memphis	81–70	Connecticut	Chris Douglas-Roberts, Memphis	Gardner–Webb, Oklahoma	Madison Square Garden, New York, NY
2006	Maryland	62–60	Michigan State	D. J. Strawberry, Maryland	St. John's, Texas	Madison Square Garden, New York, NY
2005	Florida	75–70	Syracuse	Taurean Green, Florida	Texas Tech, Wake Forest	Madison Square Garden, New York, NY
2004	Syracuse	77–62	Memphis	Hakim Warrick, Syracuse	Mississippi State, St. Mary's	Madison Square Garden, New York, NY
2003	Showcase format – no tournament					Madison Square Garden, New York, NY
2002	Showcase format – no tournament					Madison Square Garden, New York, NY
2001	Arizona	75–71	Florida	Jason Gardner, Arizona	Maryland, Temple	Madison Square Garden, New York, NY
2000	Kansas	82–74	St. John's	Kenny Gregory, Kansas	Kentucky, UCLA	Madison Square Garden, New York, NY
1999	Stanford	72–58	Iowa	Jarron Collins, Stanford	Connecticut, Duke	Madison Square Garden, New York, NY
1998	Temple	59–48	Wake Forest	Lamont Barnes, Temple	Georgetown, Illinois	Madison Square Garden, New York, NY
1997	Princeton	38–36	North Carolina State	Brian Earl, Princeton	Georgia, Texas	Continental Airlines Arena, East Rutherford, NJ
1996	Showcase format – no tournament					Boardwalk Hall, Atlantic City, NJ
1995	Showcase format – no tournament					Boardwalk Hall, Atlantic City, NJ

^{1}Tournament held behind closed doors at the Mohegan Sun Arena in Uncasville, Connecticut due to the COVID-19 pandemic.

==== Most Championships ====
Championships	Teams
3	Duke (2008, 2015, 2019)
2	Syracuse (2004, 2009), UConn (2013, 2023)

Updated through 2023 event.

==== Most appearances ====
Appearances	Teams
7	Texas (1997, 2002, 2006, 2010, 2014, 2019, 2023), Syracuse (2002, 2004, 2005, 2009, 2014, 2018, 2022)
5	UConn (1999, 2007, 2013, 2018, 2023), St. John's (2000, 2003, 2006, 2011, 2022)
4	Marquette (1995, 2002, 2003, 2016), Temple (1996, 1998, 2001, 2022), Duke (1999, 2008, 2015, 2019), Memphis (2002, 2003, 2004, 2007), California (2004, 2009, 2014, 2019)
3	Georgetown (1998, 2015, 2019), Wake Forest (1998, 2003, 2005), Iowa (1999, 2014, 2018), UCLA (2000, 2008, 2021), Maryland (2001, 2006, 2010), Alabama (2002, 2003, 2012), Villanova (2002, 2012, 2020), Pittsburgh (2003, 2010, 2016), UC-Irvine (2005, 2010, 2013), Alcorn State (2006, 2009, 2014), Prairie View (2008, 2015, 2019)

Updated through 2023 event.

== Participants and brackets ==
* – Denotes overtime period

=== 1995 ===
Showcase Format – No Tournament

Game 1
Penn State	88
Penn	61

Game 2
La Salle	68
Marquette	65

=== 1996 ===
Showcase Format – No Tournament

Game 1
Temple	76
Georgia Tech	58

Game 2
	Saint Joseph's	67
21	Tulsa	64

=== 1997 ===
Semifinals
NC State	47
19	Georgia	45
Princeton	62
22	Texas	56

Championship
Princeton	38
NC State	36
Consolation
19	Georgia	89
22	Texas	87

=== 1998 ===
Semifinals
Wake Forest	75*
Illinois	73
7	Temple	65
Georgetown	49

Championship
7	Temple	59
Wake Forest	48
Consolation
Illinois	65
Georgetown	50

=== 1999 ===
Semifinals
13	Stanford	80*
10	Duke	79
Iowa	70
1	Connecticut	68

Championship
13	Stanford	72
Iowa	58
Consolation
1	Connecticut	71
10	Duke	66

=== 2000 ===
Semifinals
7	Kansas	99
17	UCLA	98
St. John's	62
12	Kentucky	61

Championship
7	Kansas	82
St. John's	74
Consolation
17	UCLA	97
12	Kentucky	92

=== 2001 ===
Semifinals
Arizona	71
2	Maryland	67
6	Florida	72
16	Temple	64

Championship
Arizona	75
6	Florida	71
Consolation
2	Maryland	82
16	Temple	74

=== 2002 ===
Showcase Format – No Tournament

Game 1
Memphis	70
Syracuse	63

Game 2
8	Alabama	68
3	Oklahoma	62

Game 3
18	Marquette	73
	Villanova	61

Game 4
4	Texas	77
16	Georgia	71

=== 2003 ===
Showcase Format – No Tournament

Game 1
21	Wake Forest	85
	Memphis	76

Game 2
23	Marquette	52
	St. John's	45

Game 3
22	Pittsburgh	71
	Alabama	62

Game 4
18	Saint Joseph's	73
12	Gonzaga	66

=== 2004 ===
- Syracuse
- Memphis
- Mississippi State
- California
- Alabama A&M
- Belmont
- Birmingham–Southern
- Bucknell
- Fairfield
- George Mason
- IPFW
- Northern Colorado
- Princeton
- Savannah State
- Saint Mary's
- UC-Riverside

Semifinals
6	Syracuse	71
14	Mississippi State	58
23	Memphis	81
Saint Mary's	66

Championship
6	Syracuse	77
23	Memphis	62
Consolation
14	Mississippi State	67
Saint Mary's	54

=== 2005 ===
- Florida
- Syracuse
- Wake Forest
- Texas Tech
- Albany
- Bethune–Cookman
- Cornell
- George Mason
- Georgia Southern
- Mississippi Valley State
- Oakland
- Portland
- St. Francis (Pennsylvania)
- St. Peter's
- San Jose State
- UC Irvine

Semifinals
16	Syracuse	81
Texas Tech	46
Florida	77
18	Wake Forest	72

Championship
Florida	75
16	Syracuse	70
Consolation
18	Wake Forest	78**
Texas Tech	73

=== 2006 ===
- Maryland
- Michigan State
- Texas
- St. John's
- Alcorn State
- Brown
- Central Michigan
- Chicago State
- Hampton
- Loyola Maryland
- Navy
- New Orleans
- North Florida
- St. Bonaventure
- Vermont
- Youngstown State

Semifinals
Michigan State	63
18	Texas	61
Maryland	92
St. John's	60

Championship
Maryland	62
Michigan State	60
Consolation
18	Texas	77
St. John's	66

=== 2007 ===
- Memphis
- Connecticut
- Kentucky
- Oklahoma
- Alabama A&M
- Buffalo
- Central Arkansas
- Denver
- East Central (Oklahoma)
- Gardner–Webb
- Maine
- Morgan State
- Ohio Valley
- Richmond
- San Francisco
- Tennessee–Martin

Semifinals
3	Memphis	63
Oklahoma	53
Connecticut	78
Gardner–Webb	66

Championship
3	Memphis	81
Connecticut	70
Consolation
Oklahoma	69
Gardner–Webb	55

=== 2008 ===
- Duke
- Michigan
- Southern Illinois
- UCLA
- Arkansas–Monticello
- California University of Pennsylvania
- Georgia Southern
- Houston
- IUPUI
- Massachusetts
- Miami (OH)
- Michigan Tech
- Northeastern
- Prairie View A&M
- Presbyterian
- Weber State

Semifinals
Michigan	55
4	UCLA	52
5	Duke	83
Southern Illinois	58

Championship
5	Duke	71
Michigan	56
Consolation
4	UCLA	77
Southern Illinois	60

=== 2009 ===
- Syracuse
- North Carolina
- Ohio State
- California
- Albany
- Alcorn State
- Detroit
- Florida International
- Robert Morris
- James Madison
- Murray State
- North Carolina Central

Semifinals
24	Syracuse	95
12	California	73
4	North Carolina	77
15	Ohio State	73

Championship
24	Syracuse	87
4	North Carolina	71
Consolation
12	California	60
15	Ohio State	76

=== 2010 ===
- Pittsburgh
- Illinois
- Maryland
- Texas
- Charleston
- UIC
- Louisiana Tech
- Navy
- Rhode Island
- Seattle
- Toledo
- UC Irvine

Semifinals
4	Pittsburgh	79
Maryland	70
16	Illinois	84
Texas	90*

Championship
4	Pittsburgh	68
22	Texas	66
Consolation
16	Illinois	80
Maryland	76

=== 2011 ===
- Mississippi State
- Arizona
- St. John's
- Texas A&M
- Akron
- Duquesne
- Eastern Kentucky
- Hiram
- IU Kokomo
- Lehigh
- Liberty
- UDC
- Valparaiso
- William & Mary

Semifinals
18	Texas A&M	60
Mississippi State	69
St. John's	72
16	Arizona	81

Championship
Mississippi State	67
16	Arizona	57
Consolation
18	Texas A&M	58
St. John's	57

=== 2012 ===
- Alabama
- Villanova
- Purdue
- Oregon State
- Bucknell
- Hofstra
- Marshall
- New Mexico State
- Niagara
- Northern New Mexico
- South Dakota State
- UDC
- West Alabama

Semifinals; November 15; ESPN2
Alabama	65
Oregon State	62
Villanova	89*
Purdue	81

Championship; November 16; ESPN2
Alabama	77
Villanova	55
Consolation
Oregon State	66
Purdue	58

=== 2013 ===
- Connecticut
- Indiana
- Boston College
- Washington
- Boston University
- Detroit
- Eastern Washington
- Florida Atlantic
- LIU Brooklyn
- Stony Brook
- Toledo
- UC Irvine

Semifinals; November 21; ESPN2
Indiana	102
Washington	84
18	Connecticut	72
Boston College	70

Championship; November 22; ESPN2
Indiana	58
18	Connecticut	59
Consolation
Washington	78
Boston College	89

=== 2014 ===
- Texas
- Syracuse
- Iowa
- California
- Alcorn State
- Hampton
- Kennesaw State
- North Dakota State

Semifinals; November 20; ESPN2
10	Texas	71
Iowa	57
23	Syracuse	59
California	73

Championship; November 21; ESPN2
10	Texas	71
California	55
Consolation
23	Syracuse	66
Iowa	63

=== 2015 ===
- Duke
- Georgetown
- VCU
- Wisconsin
- Bryant
- Prairie View A&M
- Radford
- Siena

Semifinals; November 20; ESPN2
5	Duke	79
VCU	71
Wisconsin	61
Georgetown	71

Championship; November 22; ESPN
5	Duke	86
Georgetown	84
Consolation
VCU	73
Wisconsin	74

=== 2016 ===
- Michigan
- SMU
- Pittsburgh
- Marquette
- Eastern Michigan
- Howard
- IUPUI
- Gardner–Webb

Semifinals; November 17
Pittsburgh	67
SMU	76
Michigan	79
Marquette	61

Championship; November 18
SMU	54
Michigan	76
Consolation
Pittsburgh	78
Marquette	75

=== 2017 ===
Semifinals; November 16; ESPN2
Providence	77
Washington	70
Virginia Tech	71
Saint Louis	77

Championship; November 17; ESPN2
Providence	90
Saint Louis	63
Consolation
Washington	79
Virginia Tech	103

Nashville Subregional Semifinals; November 18
Seattle	102
Detroit Mercy	71
Houston Baptist	88
Belmont	93

Championship; November 19
Seattle	77
Belmont	90
Consolation
Detroit Mercy	116
Houston Baptist	109

=== 2018 ===
Semifinals; November 15; ESPN2
Connecticut	83
15	Syracuse	76
Iowa	77
13	Oregon	69

Championship; November 16; ESPN2
Connecticut	72
Iowa	91
Consolation
15	Syracuse	65
13	Oregon	80

Cheney Subregional Semifinals; November 16
Morehead State	99
UMKC	89
Green Bay	82*
Eastern Washington	78

Championship; November 17
Morehead State	70
Green Bay	87
Consolation
UMKC	80
Eastern Washington	87^{OT}

=== 2019 ===
Semifinals; November 21; ESPN2
Georgetown	82
22	Texas	66
1	Duke	87
California	52

Championship; November 22; ESPN2
Georgetown	73
1	Duke	81
Consolation
22	Texas	62
California	45

Riverside Subregional Semifinals; November 22
Georgia State	83
Prairie View A&M	74
Central Arkansas	98
California Baptist	104**

Championship; November 23
Georgia State	69
California Baptist	60
Consolation
Prairie View A&M	78
Central Arkansas	72

=== 2020 ===
The 2020 tournament was held November 25–26 behind closed doors at Mohegan Sun Arena in Uncasville, Connecticut as a result of COVID-19 pandemic-related restrictions.

Semifinals; November 25; ESPN
3	Villanova	76
Boston College	67
Rhode Island	88
18	Arizona State	94

Championship; November 26; ESPN
3	Villanova	83
18	Arizona State	74
Consolation
Boston College	69
Rhode Island	64

=== 2021 ===
The top two teams in the country, Gonzaga and UCLA, headlined the 27th annual Empire Classic, held at T-Mobile Arena on the Las Vegas Strip in Las Vegas, Nevada, on November 22 and 23. Joining them were Central Michigan and Bellarmine. The format reverted to a showcase event.

Showcase Format – No Tournament

November 22, 2021
2	UCLA	75
	Bellarmine	62

November 22, 2021
1	Gonzaga	107
	Central Michigan	54

November 23, 2021
2	UCLA	63
1	Gonzaga	83

November 23, 2021
Bellarmine	76
Central Michigan	69

=== 2022 ===
The tournament took place at Barclays Center in Brooklyn, New York on November 21 and 22, 2022.

Game recaps:

Semifinals; November 21; ESPN2/ESPNU
Syracuse	74*
Richmond	71
St. John's	78
Temple	72

Championship; November 22; ESPN2
Syracuse	69
St. John's	76*
Consolation
Richmond	61
Temple	49

=== 2023 ===
The tournament took place on November 19 and 20, 2023 at Madison Square Garden in Manhattan, New York.

Semifinals; November 19; ESPN2/ESPNU
No. 5 UConn	77
Indiana	57
No. 19 Texas	81
Louisville	80

Championship; November 20; ESPN2
No. 5 UConn	81
No. 15 Texas	71
Consolation
Indiana	74
Louisville	66

=== 2024 ===
Villanova and Maryland will square off in the Showcase Game of the 2024 Empire Classic benefiting Wounded Warrior Project on November 24, 2024 at Prudential Center in Newark, New Jersey.

Showcase Format – No Tournament

November 24, 2024; Prudential Center; Newark, New Jersey
Villanova	75
Maryland	76

=== 2025 ===
UCLA and California will square off in the Showcase Game of the 2025 Empire Classic benefiting Wounded Warrior Project on November 25, 2025 at the Chase Center in San Francisco, California. The two sides also host Sacramento State and Presbyterian in campus-site games.

Campus-site games
Home teams listed second.

Campus-site game November 16
Presbyterian	62
Sacramento State	64

Campus-site game November 18
Presbyterian	57
California	67

Campus-site game November 18
Sacramento State	48
No. 19 UCLA	79

Campus-site game November 21
Sacramento State	67
California	91

Campus-site game November 21
Presbyterian	46
No. 19 UCLA	86

Showcase Format – No Tournament

November 25, 2025; Chase Center; San Francisco, California
No. 18 UCLA	72
California	80
