= Shang Kaiyan =

Chinese sport shooter (born 2000)

Personal information
- Nationality: Chinese
- Born: 28 April 2000 (age 26)

Sport
- Sport: Shooting
- Event: 25 meter pistol
Medal record
Women's shooting
Representing China
World Championships
Gold medal – first place	2026 Doha	25 m standard pistol team
Asian Games
Gold medal – first place	2026 Aichi-Nagoya	25 m pistol team

Shang Kaiyan (Chinese: 尚凯艳; born 28 April 2000) is a Chinese sport shooter competing in the 25 meter pistol event.

== Career ==
In September 2026, she competed at the 2026 Asian Games and won a gold medal in the 25 metre pistol team event, along with Xiao Jiaruixuan and Yao Qianxun. She also competed in the 25 metre pistol individual event and finished in fifth place. In November 2026, she competed at the 2026 ISSF World Shooting Championships and won a gold medal in the 25 metre pistol team event with, along with Xiao Jiaruixuan and Zhang Yueyue. The team set a world record with a total score of 1698.
