= Serbia at the 2028 Summer Olympics =

- IOC code: SRB
- NOC: Olympic Committee of Serbia
- Website: www.oks.org.rs (in Serbian)

in Los Angeles, United States 14 July 2028 – 30 July 2028
- Competitors: 1 in 1 sport
- Medals: Gold 0 Silver 0 Bronze 0 Total 0

Summer Olympics appearances (overview)
- 1912; 1920–2004; 2008; 2012; 2016; 2020; 2024; 2028

Other related appearances
- Yugoslavia (1920–1992 W); Independent Olympic Participants (1992 S); Serbia and Montenegro (1996–2006)

Serbia is scheduled to compete at the 2028 Summer Olympics in Los Angeles, United States, from 14 to 30 July 2028. It will be the nation's seventh consecutive appearance at the Summer Olympics as an independent nation.

== Competitors ==
The following is the list of number of competitors in the Games.

Sport	Men	Women	Total
Shooting	0	1	1
Total	0	1	1

== Shooting ==
Serbia secured its first quota place in shooting for the 2028 Summer Olympics through Aleksandra Stojadinović, who won the gold medal in the women's 50 m rifle three positions event at the 2026 ISSF World Shooting Championships in Doha, Qatar, on 9 November 2026.

Women

Athlete	Event	Qualification		Final	
Athlete	Event	Points	Rank	Points	Rank
Aleksandra Stojadinović	50 m rifle three positions				
