= Croatia at the 2028 Summer Olympics =

- IOC code: CRO
- NOC: Croatian Olympic Committee
- Website: www.hoo.hr (in Croatian and English)

in Los Angeles, United States 14 July 2028 – 30 July 2028
- Competitors: 1 in 1 sport
- Medals: Gold 0 Silver 0 Bronze 0 Total 0

Summer Olympics appearances (overview)
- 1992; 1996; 2000; 2004; 2008; 2012; 2016; 2020; 2024; 2028

Other related appearances
- Austria (1900); Yugoslavia (1920–1988)

Croatia is scheduled to compete at the 2028 Summer Olympics in Los Angeles, United States, from 14 to 30 July 2028. It will be Croatia's tenth consecutive appearance at the Summer Olympics.

== Competitors ==
The following is the list of number of competitors in the Games.

Sport	Men	Women	Total
Shooting	1	0	1
Total	1	0	1

== Shooting ==
First Croatian athlete to secure appearance is shooter Miran Maričić by winning bronze medal in air rifle at the 2026 World Championship in Doha, Qatar.

Men

Athlete	Event	Qualification		Final	
Athlete	Event	Points	Rank	Points	Rank
Miran Maričić	10 m air rifle				
