= Norway at the 2028 Summer Olympics =

- IOC code: NOR
- NOC: Norwegian Olympic and Paralympic Committee and Confederation of Sports
- Website: www.idrett.no (in Norwegian)

in Los Angeles, United States 14 July 2028 – 30 July 2028
- Competitors: 1 in 1 sport
- Medals: Gold 0 Silver 0 Bronze 0 Total 0

Summer Olympics appearances (overview)
- 1900; ~~1904~~; 1908; 1912; 1920; 1924; 1928; 1932; 1936; 1948; 1952; 1956; 1960; 1964; 1968; 1972; 1976; 1980; 1984; 1988; 1992; 1996; 2000; 2004; 2008; 2012; 2016; 2020; 2024; 2028

Other related appearances
- 1906 Intercalated Games

Norway is scheduled to compete at the 2028 Summer Olympics in Los Angeles from 14 July to 30 July 2028. Norwegian athletes have appeared in every edition of the Summer Olympic Games, except for the 1980 Summer Olympics in Moscow because of the country's support for the United States-led boycott.

== Competitors ==
The following is the list of number of competitors in the Games.

Sport	Men	Women	Total
Shooting	1	0	1
Total	1	0	1

== Shooting ==
Norwegian athletes secured appearances by winning medals at the 2026 World Championship in Doha, Qatar.

Men

Athlete	Event	Qualification		Final	
Athlete	Event	Points	Rank	Points	Rank
	50 m rifle 3 positions				
