= Russia at the 2028 Summer Olympics =

- IOC code: RUS
- NOC: Russian Olympic Committee
- Website: www.olympic.ru (in Russian)

in Los Angeles, United States 14 July 2028 – 30 July 2028
- Competitors: 7 in 2 sports
- Medals: Gold 0 Silver 0 Bronze 0 Total 0

Summer Olympics appearances (overview)
- 1996; 2000; 2004; 2008; 2012; 2016; 2020–2024; 2028

Other related appearances
- Russian Empire (1900–1912); Soviet Union (1952–1988); Unified Team (1992); ROC (2020); Individual Neutral Athletes (2024)

Russia is expected to compete at the 2028 Summer Olympics in Los Angeles from 14 July to 30 July 2028. This will be the Russian Federation's seventh appearance at the Summer Olympics.

== Background ==
On 7 July 2026, the International Olympic Committee (IOC) provisionally lifted the suspension of the Russian Olympic Committee, allowing Russian athletes to participate in qualification stages for the 2028 Summer Olympics. However, the sanctions prohibiting the use of the Russian national flag and anthem remain in place, with the IOC stating that a decision regarding the return of national symbols will be made at a later date.

== Competitors ==
The following is the list of number of competitors in the Games.

Sport	Men	Women	Total
Gymnastics	5	0	5
Shooting	1	1	2
Total	6	1	7

== Gymnastics ==
=== Artistic ===
Russia secured a team berth at the 2028 Summer Olympics by the men's artistic gymnastics team winning a silver medal at the 2026 World Artistic Gymnastics Championships.

Men
Team

Athlete	Event	Qualification								Final							
Athlete	Event	Apparatus						Total	Rank	Apparatus						Total	Rank
Athlete	Event	F	PH	R	V	PB	HB	Total	Rank	F	PH	R	V	PB	HB	Total	Rank
	Team																
Total	Team																

== Shooting ==
Russia secured two quotas from the 2026 World Shooting Championships in Doha, Qatar.

Men

Athlete	Event	Qualification		Final	
Athlete	Event	Points	Rank	Points	Rank
Dmitrii Pimenov	50 m rifle three positions				

Women

Athlete	Event	Qualification		Final	
Athlete	Event	Points	Rank	Points	Rank
Daria Semianova	Trap				
