= Kazakhstan at the 2028 Summer Olympics =

- IOC code: KAZ
- NOC: National Olympic Committee of the Republic of Kazakhstan
- Website: www.olympic.kz (in Kazakh, Russian, and English)

in Los Angeles, United States 14 July 2028 – 30 July 2028
- Competitors: 1 in 1 sport
- Medals: Gold 0 Silver 0 Bronze 0 Total 0

Summer Olympics appearances (overview)
- 1996; 2000; 2004; 2008; 2012; 2016; 2020; 2024; 2028

Other related appearances
- Russian Empire (1900–1912); Soviet Union (1952–1988); Unified Team (1992)

Kazakhstan competed at the 2028 Summer Olympics in Los Angeles from 14 July to 30 July 2024. It will be the nation's ninth consecutive appearance at the Summer Olympics in the post-Soviet era.

== Competitors ==
The following is the list of number of competitors in the Games.

Sport	Men	Women	Total
Shooting	0	1	1
Total	0	1	1

== Shooting ==
Kazakh athletes secured appearances by winning medals at the 2026 World Shooting Championships in Doha, Qatar.

Women

Athlete	Event	Qualification		Final	
Athlete	Event	Points	Rank	Points	Rank
	Skeet				
