= Slovakia at the 2028 Summer Olympics =

- IOC code: SVK
- NOC: Slovak Olympic and Sports Committee
- Website: www.olympic.sk (in Slovak)

in Los Angeles, United States 14 July 2028 – 30 July 2028
- Competitors: 2 in 1 sport
- Medals: Gold 0 Silver 0 Bronze 0 Total 0

Summer Olympics appearances (overview)
- 1996; 2000; 2004; 2008; 2012; 2016; 2020; 2024; 2028

Other related appearances
- Hungary (1896–1912); Czechoslovakia (1924–1992)

Slovakia is scheduled to compete at the 2028 Summer Olympics in Paris from 14 July to 30 July 2028. It will be the nation's ninth consecutive appearance at the Summer Olympics after gaining its independence from the former Czechoslovakia.

== Competitors ==
The following is the list of number of competitors in the Games.

Sport	Men	Women	Total
Shooting	1	1	2
Total	1	1	2

== Shooting ==
Slovak athlete secured appearances by winning medals at the 2026 World Championship in Doha, Qatar.

Men

Athlete	Event	Qualification		Final	
Athlete	Event	Points	Rank	Points	Rank
Patrik Jány	10 m air rifle				

Women

Athlete	Event	Qualification		Final	
Athlete	Event	Points	Rank	Points	Rank
	Skeet				
