= India at the 2028 Summer Olympics =

- IOC code: IND
- NOC: Indian Olympic Committee
- Website: olympic.ind.in

in Los Angeles, United States 14 July 2028 – 30 July 2028
- Competitors: 53 in 4 sports
- Medals: Gold 0 Silver 0 Bronze 0 Total 0

Summer Olympics appearances (overview)
- 1900; 1904–1912; 1920; 1924; 1928; 1932; 1936; 1948; 1952; 1956; 1960; 1964; 1968; 1972; 1976; 1980; 1984; 1988; 1992; 1996; 2000; 2004; 2008; 2012; 2016; 2020; 2024; 2028

Other related appearances
- Pakistan (1948–pres.); Bangladesh (1984–pres.)

India will compete at the 2028 Summer Olympics to be held in Los Angeles, United States from 14 July to 30 July 2028. The country debuted at the 1900 Summer Olympics and has appeared at every edition of the Summer Olympics since the 1920 edition. This edition will mark the nation's 27th appearance at the Summer Olympics.

== Competitors ==
The following is a list of the number of competitors participating in the Games:

Sport	Men	Women	Total
Archery	1	2	3
Cricket	0	15	15
Field hockey	16	16	32
Shooting	3	0	3
Total	20	33	53

== Archery ==
India secured its initial three archery quotas during the 2026 Asian Games. India was the first NOC, apart from the hosts, to secure the mixed team compound event quota, which will make its olympic debut in this edition.

=== Compound ===
Athlete	Event	Ranking round		Quarterfinals	Semifinals	Final / BM	
Athlete	Event	Score	Seed	Opposition Score	Opposition Score	Opposition Score	Rank
	Mixed team						

=== Recurve ===
Athlete	Event	Ranking round		Round of 64	Round of 32	Round of 16	Quarterfinals	Semifinals	Final / BM	
Athlete	Event	Score	Seed	Opposition Score	Opposition Score	Opposition Score	Opposition Score	Opposition Score	Opposition Score	Rank
	Women's individual									

== Cricket ==
Summary

Team	Event	Group Stage						Final / BM	
Team	Event	Opposition Score	Opposition Score	Opposition Score	Opposition Score	Opposition Score	Rank	Opposition Score	Rank
India women's	Women's tournament								

=== Women's tournament ===
The women's cricket team qualified for the Games by finishing as the top-ranked Asian team at the 2026 Women's T20 World Cup.

== Field hockey ==
Summary

Team	Event	Group Stage						Quarter-finals	Semi-finals	Final / BM	
Team	Event	Opposition Score	Opposition Score	Opposition Score	Opposition Score	Opposition Score	Rank	Opposition Score	Opposition Score	Opposition Score	Rank
India men's	Men's tournament										
India women's	Women's tournament										

=== Men's tournament ===
The men's hockey team qualified for the Games by winning the gold medal in the 2026 Asian Games.

=== Women's tournament ===
The women's hockey team qualified for the Games by winning gold in the 2026 Asian Games. This will be the team’s first time entering the Games as the reigning continental champion.

== Shooting ==
India secured three quotas from the 2026 World Shooting Championships.

Men

Athlete	Event	Qualification		Final	
Athlete	Event	Points	Rank	Points	Rank
	10 m air pistol				
	50 m rifle three positions				
	Trap				

== See also ==
- 2028 Summer Olympics
