= Aleksandra Stojadinović =

Serbian sport shooter

Personal information
- Nationality: Serbian
- Born: 19 August 2004 (age 22)

Sport
- Country: Serbia
- Sport: Sports shooting
- Events: 10 metre air rifle; 50 metre rifle three positions
Medal record
Women's shooting
Representing Serbia
World Championships
Gold medal – first place	2026 Doha	50m rifle TP
European Championships
Silver medal – second place	2025 Osijek	10m air rifle Mix
Bronze medal – third place	2025 Osijek	10m air rifle
Mediterranean Games
Bronze medal – third place	2026 Taranto	10m air rifle

Aleksandra Stojadinović (née Havran; Serbian Cyrillic: Александра Стојадиновић, née Хавран; born 19 August 2004) is a Serbian sport shooter. Her hometown is Stara Pazova. In her first year as a senior athlete, in 2025, she won a bronze medal in the 10m air rifle event at the European Championship, as well as a silver medal in the mixed team competition alongside Aleksa Rakonjac. In the same year, she was named Serbia's Best Female Shooter of the Year. Stojadinović represented Serbia at the 2026 Mediterranean Games in Taranto, where she won a bronze medal in the 10m air rifle event. At the 2026 World Championships in Doha, she won the gold medal in the 50m Small-Bore Rifle 3 Positions event, becoming the first Serbian athlete to qualify for the 2028 Olympic Games.
