= Iran at the 2028 Summer Olympics =

- IOC code: IRI
- NOC: National Olympic Committee of the Islamic Republic of Iran
- Website: www.olympic.ir (in Persian and English)

in Los Angeles, United States 14 July 2028 – 30 July 2028
- Competitors: 1 in 1 sport
- Medals: Gold 0 Silver 0 Bronze 0 Total 0

Summer Olympics appearances (overview)
- 1900; 1904–1936; 1948; 1952; 1956; 1960; 1964; 1968; 1972; 1976; 1980–1984; 1988; 1992; 1996; 2000; 2004; 2008; 2012; 2016; 2020; 2024; 2028

Iran (officially called the Islamic Republic of Iran) competed at the 2028 Summer Olympics in Los Angeles from 14 to 30 July 2028. Since the nation's return in 1948 after having made their debut in 1900, Iranian athletes have appeared in every edition of the Summer Olympic Games except for Moscow 1980 and Los Angeles 1984, citing political reasons. This will be the nation's 20th appearance at the Summer Olympics.

== Competitors ==
The following is the list of the number of competitors in the Games.

Sport	Men	Women	Total
Shooting	0	1	1
Total	0	1	1

== Shooting ==
Hanieh Rostamian secured an Olympic quota in the 10m air pistol event at the 2026 World Championships in Doha, Qatar.

Women

Athlete	Event	Qualification		Final	
Athlete	Event	Points	Rank	Points	Rank
Hanieh Rostamian	10 m air pistol				
