= Kévin Chapon =

French sport shooter (born 1987)

Personal information
- Nationality: French
- Born: 31 October 1987 (age 39)

Sport
- Sport: Shooting
- Event: 25 meter standard pistol
Medal record
Men's shooting
Representing France
World Championships
Gold medal – first place	2025 Cairo	25 m center fire pistol team
Gold medal – first place	2026 Doha	25 m standard pistol
Bronze medal – third place	2023 Baku	25 m standard pistol
European Championships
Gold medal – first place	2024 Osijek	Open 25 m standard pistol
Silver medal – second place	2026 Osijek	25 m standard pistol team
Bronze medal – third place	2025 Châteauroux	25 m center fire pistol team

Kévin Chapon (born 31 October 1987) is a French sport shooter competing in the 25 meter standard pistol event.

== Career ==
Chapon competed at the 2023 ISSF World Shooting Championships and won a bronze medal in the 25 metre standard pistol event with a score of 574 points.

In November 2025, he competed at the 2025 ISSF World Shooting Championships and won a gold medal in the 25 metre center fire pistol team event.

In May 2026, he competed at the 2026 European Shooting Championships and won a silver medal in the 25 metre standard pistol team event. In November 2026, he competed at the 2026 ISSF World Shooting Championships and won a gold medal in the 25 meter standard pistol event with a score of 578 points.
