= Czech Republic at the 2028 Summer Olympics =

- IOC code: CZE
- NOC: Czech Olympic Committee
- Website: www.olympic.cz (in Czech and English)

in Los Angeles, United States 14 July 2028 – 30 July 2028
- Competitors: 1 in 1 sport
- Medals: Gold 0 Silver 0 Bronze 0 Total 0

Summer Olympics appearances (overview)
- 1996; 2000; 2004; 2008; 2012; 2016; 2020; 2024; 2028

Other related appearances
- Bohemia (1900–1912); Czechoslovakia (1924–1992)

The Czech Republic, officially named Czechia by the IOC, competed at the 2024 Summer Olympics in Paris from 26 July to 11 August 2024. Czech athletes have appeared in every edition of the Summer Olympic Games, except for three occasions: Athens 1896, St. Louis 1904 and Los Angeles 1984 as part of the Soviet boycott. It is the nation's eighth consecutive appearance at the Summer Olympics after splitting from the former Czechoslovakia.

== Competitors ==
The following is the list of number of competitors in the Games.

Sport	Men	Women	Total
Shooting	1	0	1
Total	1	0	1

== Shooting ==
Czech athletes secured appearances by winning medals at the 2026 World Championship in Doha, Qatar.

Men

Athlete	Event	Qualification		Final	
Athlete	Event	Points	Rank	Points	Rank
Jindřich Dubový	10 m air pistol				
Jindřich Dubový	25m Rapid Fire Pistol				
