= Squash at the 2028 Summer Olympics =

Squash at the Games of the XXXIV Olympiad
- Venue: Universal Studios Lot; Universal City, California
- Dates: 15 – 24 July
- No. of events: 2
- Competitors: 32 (16 men, 16 women)

The 2028 Summer Olympics will include the sport of squash for the first time as an optional sport. Squash had previously been rejected from the Olympic Games on four occasions in a row. Competitions will be held in two events, men's individual and women's individual. Each field will consist of 16 players. The squash events are planned to be held on the Universal Studios Lot in Universal City, California. The events will be sponsored by Comcast.

Squash has been a regular fixture at multi-sport events such as the Asian Games, Pan American Games, Commonwealth Games and World Games. It was accepted as a demonstration sport for the 2018 Summer Youth Olympics.

== Medal table ==
Rank	Nation	Gold	Silver	Bronze	Total
Totals (0 entries)		0	0	0	0

== Events ==
Event	Gold	Silver	Bronze
Men's singles			
Women's singles			
