= Shooting at the 2026 Asian Games – Women's 25 metre pistol =

Women's 25 metre pistol at the 2026 Asian Games
- Venue: Aichi Pref. General Shooting Gallery
- Dates: 27–28 September 2026
- Competitors: 45 from 18 nations

Medalists
gold medal	Xiao Jiaruixuan	China
silver medal	Esha Singh	India
bronze medal	Kim Hyon Suk	North Korea

The women's 25 metre pistol competition at the 2026 Asian Games in Aichi Prefecture, Japan was held on 27 and 28 September 2026 at Aichi Pref. General Shooting Gallery.

== Schedule ==
All times are Japan Standard Time (UTC+09:00) The schedule is as follows:

Date	Time	Event
Sunday, 27 September 2026	09:40	Qualification precision
Monday, 28 September 2026	09:40	Qualification rapid
Monday, 28 September 2026	14:15	Final

== Records ==
Prior to this competition, the existing world, Asian and Games records were as follows.

Qualification
World Record	Rhythm Sangwan (IND)	595	Baku, Azerbaijan	13 May 2023
Asian Record	Luna Tao (CHN)	594	Munich, Germany	23 August 2002
Games Record	Manu Bhaker (IND)	593	Palembang, Indonesia	22 August 2018
Final
World Record	Esha Singh (IND)	43	Munich, Germany	27 May 2026
Asian Record	Alia Sazana Azahari (MAS)	44	Bangkok, Thailand	16 February 2025
Games Record	Liu Rui (CHN)	38	Hangzhou, China	27 September 2023

== Results ==
Legend

- DNS — Did not start

=== Qualification ===
Rank	Athlete	Precision			Rapid			Total	Xs	Notes
Rank	Athlete	1	2	3	1	2	3	Total	Xs	Notes
1	Haniyeh Rostamiyan (IRI)	96	97	98	100	97	99	587	25	Q
2	Xiao Jiaruixuan (CHN)	97	96	97	99	98	99	586	26	Q
3	Trinh Thu Vinh (VIE)	95	99	97	98	98	98	585	22	Q
4	Kim Hyon Suk (PRK)	97	98	96	99	96	98	584	21	Q
5	Tien Chia-Chen (TPE)	96	94	96	100	98	99	583	19	Q
6	Shang Kaiyan (CHN)	95	97	97	99	96	97	581	23	Q
7	Bong Seo-rin (KOR)	98	95	96	98	97	97	581	14	Q
8	Esha Singh (IND)	99	95	96	98	96	96	580	22	Q
9	Cheng Yen-Ching (TPE)	93	97	96	97	98	99	580	20	
10	Oh Ye-jin (KOR)	96	99	94	98	98	94	579	24	
11	Manu Bhaker (IND)	96	95	96	97	96	99	579	18	
12	Nguyễn Thùy Trang (VIE)	96	95	92	99	98	98	578	20	
13	Teh Xiu Hong (SGP)	96	97	95	95	96	98	577	21	
14	Teh Xiu Yi (SGP)	99	95	95	93	98	97	577	15	
15	Yao Qianxun (CHN)	98	95	96	95	95	97	576	19	
16	Tumurchudur Bayartsetseg (MGL)	93	95	96	96	97	99	576	17	
17	Yang Ji-in (KOR)	95	99	98	98	96	89	575	27	
18	Valeriya Popelova (KAZ)	96	95	98	93	96	97	575	13	
19	Alia Sazana Azahari (MAS)	94	94	92	99	98	97	574	16	
20	Pak Hyon Gyong (PRK)	91	95	97	96	98	97	574	14	
21	Mika Zaitsu (JPN)	90	93	95	97	100	97	572	14	
22	Wenas Juliani (INA)	95	95	94	97	98	93	572	13	
23	Altankhuyag Buyandelger (MGL)	94	92	94	94	97	100	571	23	
24	Chizuru Sasaki (JPN)	92	97	95	97	98	92	571	19	
25	Duaa Rahmatalla M Habib (QAT)	91	95	94	96	99	96	571	18	
26	Chen Yu-Ju (TPE)	94	98	94	94	97	94	571	9	
27	Tumurchudur Bayarmaa (MGL)	95	94	94	92	97	97	569	18	
28	Nguyen Thuy Dung (VIE)	93	95	91	98	95	97	569	14	
29	Rihadatul Asyifa (INA)	94	94	91	98	95	97	569	12	
30	Rahi Sarnobat (IND)	95	96	96	86	99	96	568	16	
31	Natsara Champalat (THA)	92	96	95	96	96	93	568	15	
32	Ri Su Rim (PRK)	95	94	95	90	97	96	567	14	
33	Rabia Kabir (PAK)	93	92	93	97	95	97	567	13	
34	Nigina Saidkulova (UZB)	97	98	95	91	90	96	567	13	
35	Franchette Shayne Quiroz (PHI)	93	94	98	93	93	96	567	9	
36	Nechaya Klaisuban (THA)	92	98	93	95	95	93	566	15	
37	Nina Starova (KAZ)	94	97	92	91	95	97	566	11	
38	Nurul Syasya Nadiah Binti Mohd Arifin (MAS)	94	99	92	96	91	92	564	11	
39	Samieh Yasi (IRI)	88	98	91	97	94	95	563	17	
40	Saule Alimbek (KAZ)	95	96	92	94	91	94	562	9	
41	Satoko Yamada (JPN)	95	94	92	87	93	98	559	9	
42	Kamonlak Saencha (THA)	95	93	94	97	94	85	558	14	
43	Zeynab Toumari (IRI)	92	89	94	93	94	92	554	7	
44	Shiva Awallu Nissa (INA)	90	92	89	92	96	91	550	6	
—	Kishmala Talat (PAK)							DNS		

=== Final ===
Rank	Athlete	1st stage	2nd stage – Elimination									S-off	Notes
Rank	Athlete	1	1	2	3	4	5	6	7	8	9	S-off	Notes
1st place, gold medalist(s)	Xiao Jiaruixuan (CHN)	3	8	13	16	20	25	28	32	35	38		GR
2nd place, silver medalist(s)	Esha Singh (IND)	5	9	12	16	20	23	26	31	34	38		GR
3rd place, bronze medalist(s)	Kim Hyon Suk (PRK)	4	8	11	15	20	24	29	32	34		SO	
4	Trinh Thu Vinh (VIE)	3	6	9	14	18	23	28	30				
5	Shang Kaiyan (CHN)	3	7	11	15	18	21						
6	Tien Chia-Chen (TPE)	2	5	9	12	15							
7	Haniyeh Rostamiyan (IRI)	2	5	8	12								
8	Bong Seo-rin (KOR)	3	5	7									
