= Shooting at the 2026 Asian Games – Women's 25 metre pistol team =

Women's 25 metre pistol team at the 2026 Asian Games
- Venue: Aichi Pref. General Shooting Gallery
- Dates: 28 September 2026
- Competitors: 36 from 12 nations

Medalists
gold medal	China; Shang Kaiyan, Xiao Jiaruixuan, Yao Qianxun
silver medal	South Korea; Oh Ye-jin, Bong Seo-rin, Yang Ji-in
bronze medal	Chinese Taipei; Tien Chia-Chen, Cheng Yen-Ching, Chen Yu-Ju

The women's 25 metre pistol team competition at the 2026 Asian Games in Aichi Prefecture, Japan was held on 28 September 2026 at Aichi Pref. General Shooting Gallery.

== Schedule ==
All times are Japan Standard Time (UTC+09:00)

Date	Time	Event
Monday, 28 September 2026	09:40	Final

== Records ==
Prior to this competition, the existing world, Asian and Games records were as follows.

World Record	China	1768	Busan, South Korea	4 October 2002
Asian Record	China	1768	Busan, South Korea	4 October 2002
Games Record	China	1768	Busan, South Korea	4 October 2002

== Results ==
Rank	Team	Precision			Rapid			Total	Xs	Notes
Rank	Team	1	2	3	1	2	3	Total	Xs	Notes
1st place, gold medalist(s)	China (CHN)	290	288	290	293	289	293	1743	68	
	Shang Kaiyan	95	97	97	99	96	97	581	23	
	Xiao Jiaruixuan	97	96	97	99	98	99	586	26	
	Yao Qianxun	98	95	96	95	95	97	576	19	
2nd place, silver medalist(s)	South Korea (KOR)	289	293	288	294	291	280	1735	65	
	Oh Ye-jin	96	99	94	98	98	94	579	24	
	Bong Seo-rin	98	95	96	98	97	97	581	14	
	Yang Ji-in	95	99	98	98	96	89	575	27	
3rd place, bronze medalist(s)	Chinese Taipei (TPE)	283	289	286	291	293	292	1734	48	
	Tien Chia-Chen	96	94	96	100	98	99	583	19	
	Cheng Yen-Ching	93	97	96	97	98	99	580	20	
	Chen Yu-Ju	94	98	94	94	97	94	571	9	
4	Vietnam (VIE)	284	289	280	295	291	293	1732	56	
	Trinh Thu Vinh	95	99	97	98	98	98	585	22	
	Nguyễn Thùy Trang	96	95	92	99	98	98	578	20	
	Nguyen Thuy Dung	93	95	91	98	95	97	569	14	
5	India (IND)	290	286	288	281	291	291	1727	56	
	Esha Singh	99	95	96	98	96	96	580	22	
	Manu Bhaker	96	95	96	97	96	99	579	18	
	Rahi Sarnobat	95	96	96	86	99	96	568	16	
6	North Korea (PRK)	283	287	288	285	291	291	1725	49	
	Kim Hyon Suk	97	98	96	99	96	98	584	21	
	Pak Hyon Gyong	91	95	97	96	98	97	574	14	
	Ri Su Rim	95	94	95	90	97	96	567	14	
7	Mongolia (MGL)	282	281	284	282	291	296	1716	58	
	Altankhuyag Buyandelger	94	92	94	94	97	100	571	23	
	Tumurchudur Bayarmaa	95	94	94	92	97	97	569	18	
	Tumurchudur Bayartsetseg	93	95	96	96	97	99	576	17	
8	Iran (IRI)	276	284	283	290	285	286	1704	49	
	Haniyeh Rostamiyan	96	97	98	100	97	99	587	25	
	Samieh Yasi	88	98	91	97	94	95	563	17	
	Zeynab Toumari	92	89	94	93	94	92	554	7	
9	Kazakhstan (KAZ)	285	288	282	278	282	288	1703	33	
	Valeriya Popelova	96	95	98	93	96	97	575	13	
	Nina Starova	94	97	92	91	95	97	566	11	
	Saule Alimbek	95	96	92	94	91	94	562	9	
10	Japan (JPN)	277	284	282	281	291	287	1702	42	
	Mika Zaitsu	90	93	95	97	100	97	572	14	
	Chizuru Sasaki	92	97	95	97	98	92	571	19	
	Satoko Yamada	95	94	92	87	93	98	559	9	
11	Thailand (THA)	279	287	282	288	285	271	1692	44	
	Natsara Champalat	92	96	95	96	96	93	568	15	
	Kamonlak Saencha	95	93	94	97	94	85	558	14	
	Nechaya Klaisuban	92	98	93	95	95	93	566	15	
12	Indonesia (INA)	279	281	274	287	289	281	1691	31	
	Wenas Juliani	95	95	94	97	98	93	572	13	
	Rihadatul Asyifa	94	94	91	98	95	97	569	12	
	Shiva Awallu Nissa	90	92	89	92	96	91	550	6	
