= Egypt at the 2028 Summer Olympics =

- IOC code: EGY
- NOC: Egyptian Olympic Committee
- Website: www.egyptianolympic.org (in Arabic and English)

in Los Angeles, United States 11 July 2028 – 30 July 2028
- Competitors: 13 in 2 sports
- Medals: Gold 0 Silver 0 Bronze 0 Total 0

Summer Olympics appearances (overview)
- 1912; 1920; 1924; 1928; 1932; 1936; 1948; 1952; 1956; 1960–1964; 1968; 1972; 1976; 1980; 1984; 1988; 1992; 1996; 2000; 2004; 2008; 2012; 2016; 2020; 2024; 2028

Other related appearances
- 1906 Intercalated Games –––– United Arab Republic (1960, 1964)

Egypt is scheduled to compete at the 2028 Summer Olympics in Los Angeles, from 14 to 30 July 2028. Since the nation's debut in 1912, Egyptian athletes have appeared in every edition of the Summer Olympic Games except for two occasions: the 1932 Summer Olympics in Los Angeles because of the worldwide Great Depression and the 1980 Summer Olympics in Moscow, as part of the United States-led boycott.

== Competitors ==
The following is the list of number of competitors in the Games.

Sport	Men	Women	Total
Shooting	1	0	1
Volleyball	0	12	12
Total	1	12	13

== Shooting ==
Egyptian athletes secured appearances by winning medals at the 2026 World Shooting Championships in Doha, Qatar.

Men

Athlete	Event	Qualification		Final	
Athlete	Event	Points	Rank	Points	Rank
Azmy Mehelba	skeet				

== Volleyball ==
For the first time in history, Egypt women's team secured qualification for the Games by winning the competition and claiming the direct African qualification at the 2026 Women's African Nations Volleyball Championship in Nairobi, Kenya.

Team	Event	Group stage				Quarterfinal	Semifinal	Final / BM	
Team	Event	Opposition Score	Opposition Score	Opposition Score	Rank	Opposition Score	Opposition Score	Opposition Score	Rank
Egypt women's	Women's tournament								
