= Zhang Yueyue =

Chinese sport shooter (born 2006)

Personal information
- Nationality: Chinese
- Born: 4 June 2006 (age 20) Jiangsu, China

Sport
- Sport: Shooting
- Event: 25 meter pistol
Medal record
Women's shooting
Representing China
World Championships
Gold medal – first place	2026 Doha	25 m standard pistol team
Bronze medal – third place	2026 Doha	25 m pistol
Asian Championships
Gold medal – first place	2025 Shymkent	25 m pistol
Gold medal – first place	2025 Shymkent	25 m pistol team

Zhang Yueyue (Chinese: 张悦悦; born 4 June 2006) is a Chinese sport shooter competing in the 25 meter pistol event.

== Career ==
In August 2025, Zhang competed at the 2025 Asian Shooting Championships and won gold medals in the 25 metre pistol and 25 metre pistol team events.

In November 2026, she competed at the 2026 ISSF World Shooting Championships and won a gold medal in the 25 metre pistol team event along with Xiao Jiaruixuan and Shang Kaiyan. The team set a world record with a total score of 1698. She also won a bronze medal in the 25 metre pistol event, securing an Olympic quota spot for the Chinese Olympic Committee in this event.
