= Hungary at the 2028 Summer Olympics =

- IOC code: HUN
- NOC: Croatian Olympic Committee
- Website: www.olimpia.hu (in Hungarian and English)

in Los Angeles, United States 14 July 2028 – 30 July 2028
- Competitors: 1 in 1 sport
- Medals: Gold 0 Silver 0 Bronze 0 Total 0

Summer Olympics appearances (overview)
- 1896; 1900; 1904; 1908; 1912; 1920; 1924; 1928; 1932; 1936; 1948; 1952; 1956; 1960; 1964; 1968; 1972; 1976; 1980; 1984; 1988; 1992; 1996; 2000; 2004; 2008; 2012; 2016; 2020; 2024; 2028

Other related appearances
- 1906 Intercalated Games

Hungary is scheduled to compete at the 2024 Summer Olympics in Paris from 26 July to 11 August 2024. Hungarian athletes have appeared in every edition of the Summer Olympic Games except two: Antwerp 1920 because of the country's role in World War I and Los Angeles 1984 as part of the Soviet-led boycott.

== Competitors ==
The following is the list of number of competitors in the Games.

Sport	Men	Women	Total
Shooting	0	1	1
Total	0	1	1

== Shooting ==
First Hungarian athlete to secure appearance is shooter Veronika Major by winning silver medal in air pistol at the 2026 World Championship in Doha, Qatar.

Women

Athlete	Event	Qualification		Final	
Athlete	Event	Points	Rank	Points	Rank
Veronika Major	10 m air pistol				
