= France at the 2028 Summer Olympics =

- IOC code: FRA
- NOC: French National Olympic and Sports Committee
- Website: www.franceolympique.com (in French)

in Los Angeles, United States 11 July 2028 – 30 July 2028
- Competitors: 9 in 3 sports
- Medals: Gold 0 Silver 0 Bronze 0 Total 0

Summer Olympics appearances (overview)
- 1896; 1900; ~~1904~~; 1908; 1912; 1920; 1924; 1928; 1932; 1936; 1948; 1952; 1956; 1960; 1964; 1968; 1972; 1976; 1980; 1984; 1988; 1992; 1996; 2000; 2004; 2008; 2012; 2016; 2020; 2024; 2028

Other related appearances
- 1906 Intercalated Games

France (the host of previous edition) is scheduled to compete at the 2028 Summer Olympics in Los Angeles, from 14 to 30 July 2028. France is set to make its consecutive appearance at the Summer Olympic Games, having participated in every edition since the inaugural Games of the modern era, alongside Australia, Great Britain, Greece, and Switzerland.

== Competitors ==
The following is the list of number of competitors in the Games.

Sport	Men	Women	Total
Equestrian	0	0	3
Shooting	1	1	2
Triathlon	2	2	4
Total	3	3	9

== Equestrian ==
France secured a jumping squad quotas by placing among one of the seven highest ranked eligible nations, excluding the host country United States (France finished eighth and the United States fourth, so France qualified), at the 2026 FEI World Championships in Aachen, Germany in August 2026.

=== Jumping ===
Athlete	Horse	Event	Qualification			Final			Jump-off		
Athlete	Horse	Event	Penalties	Time	Rank	Penalties	Time	Rank	Penalties	Time	Rank
		Individual									
	See above	Team							—N/a		

Qualification Legend: Q = Qualified for the final based on position in group; q = Qualified for the final based on overall position

== Shooting ==
French athletes secured appearances by winning medals at the 2026 World Championship in Doha, Qatar.

Men

Athlete	Event	Qualification		Final	
Athlete	Event	Points	Rank	Points	Rank
Clément Bessaguet	25m Rapid Fire Pistol				
	10m Air Rifle				

== Triathlon ==
France qualified four athletes, comprising two men and two women, by winning the mixed relay gold medal and securing the sole available quota place at the 2026 World Mixed Relay Championships in Hamburg, Germany.

Individual

Athlete	Event	Time						Rank
Athlete	Event	Swim (1.5 km)	Trans 1	Bike (40 km)	Trans 2	Run (10 km)	Total	Rank
	Men's							
	Women's							

Relay

Athlete	Event	Time						Rank
Athlete	Event	Swim (300 m)	Trans 1	Bike (7 km)	Trans 2	Run (2 km)	Total	Rank
	Mixed relay							—N/a
Total	Mixed relay	—N/a						
