= South Korea at the 2028 Summer Olympics =

Sporting event delegation

- IOC code: KOR
- NOC: Korean Olympic Committee
- Website: www.sports.or.kr (in Korean and English)

in Los Angeles, United States 14 July 2028 – 30 July 2028
- Competitors: 6 in 3 sports
- Medals: Gold 0 Silver 0 Bronze 0 Total 0

Summer Olympics appearances (overview)
- 1948; 1952; 1956; 1960; 1964; 1968; 1972; 1976; 1980; 1984; 1988; 1992; 1996; 2000; 2004; 2008; 2012; 2016; 2020; 2024; 2028

South Korea, officially the Republic of Korea, is scheduled to compete at the 2028 Summer Olympics in Los Angeles, from 14 to 30 July 2028. It will be the nation's twentienth appearance at the Summer Olympics.

== Competitors ==
The following is the list of number of competitors in the Games.

Sport	Men	Women	Total
Archery	1	1	2
Sailing	1	0	1
Shooting	0	3	3
Total	2	4	6

== Archery ==
South Korea enter two archers into the Summer Olympics by virtue of top two highest ranked finished nation for men's and women's individual recurve, not yet qualified, through the 2026 Asian Games in Okazaki, Aichi, Japan.

=== Recurve ===
Athlete	Event	Ranking round		Round of 64	Round of 32	Round of 16	Quarterfinals	Semifinals	Final / BM	
Athlete	Event	Score	Seed	Opposition Score	Opposition Score	Opposition Score	Opposition Score	Opposition Score	Opposition Score	Rank
	Men's individual									
	Women's individual									
	Mixed team			—N/a						

== Sailing ==
South Korea qualified one sailor secured for the games, as their athlete successfully win the gold medal in the mens dinghy event, at the 2026 Asian Games in Gamagōri, Japan.

Medal race events

Athlete	Event	Race										Net points	Final rank
Athlete	Event	1	2	3	4	5	6	7	8	9	M*	Net points	Final rank
	Men's ILCA 7												

== Shooting ==
South Korea secured three quotas from the 2026 World Shooting Championships.

Women

Athlete	Event	Qualification		Final	
Athlete	Event	Points	Rank	Points	Rank
Yang Ji-in	25 m air pistol				
Ban Hyo-jin	10 m air rifle				
Oh Se-hee	50m Rifle 3 Positions				
