= China at the 2028 Summer Olympics =

- IOC code: CHN
- NOC: Chinese Olympic Committee
- Website: www.olympic.cn (in Chinese and English)

in Los Angeles, United States 14 July 2028 – 30 July 2028
- Competitors: 21 in 5 sports
- Medals: Gold 0 Silver 0 Bronze 0 Total 0

Summer Olympics appearances (overview)
- 1952; 1956–1980; 1984; 1988; 1992; 1996; 2000; 2004; 2008; 2012; 2016; 2020; 2024; 2028

Other related appearances
- Republic of China (1924–1948)

China is scheduled to compete at the 2028 Summer Olympics in Los Angeles, from 14 to 30 July 2028. It will be the nation's thirteenth appearance at the Summer Olympics, since its official debut in 1952.

== Competitors ==
The following is the list of number of competitors in the Games.

Sport	Men	Women	Total
Archery	1	1	2
Gymnastics	5	5	10
Shooting	3	4	7
Tennis	0	1	1
Triathlon	0	1	1
Total	9	12	21

== Archery ==
China enter two archers (one men & one women) into the recurve event at the Summer Olympics by virtue of a mixed team recurve gold medal finish at the 2026 Asian Games in Okazaki, Aichi, Japan.

=== Recurve ===
Athlete	Event	Ranking round		Round of 64	Round of 32	Round of 16	Quarterfinals	Semifinals	Final / BM	
Athlete	Event	Score	Seed	Opposition Score	Opposition Score	Opposition Score	Opposition Score	Opposition Score	Opposition Score	Rank
	Men's individual									
	Women's individual									
	Mixed team			—N/a						

== Gymnastics ==
=== Artistic ===
China secured two team berth at the 2028 Summer Olympics by winning medals at the 2026 World Artistic Gymnastics Championships.

Men
Team

Athlete	Event	Qualification								Final							
Athlete	Event	Apparatus						Total	Rank	Apparatus						Total	Rank
Athlete	Event	F	PH	R	V	PB	HB	Total	Rank	F	PH	R	V	PB	HB	Total	Rank
	Team																
Total	Team																

Women
Team

Athlete	Event	Qualification								Final							
Athlete	Event	Apparatus						Total	Rank	Apparatus						Total	Rank
Athlete	Event	F	PH	R	V	PB	HB	Total	Rank	F	PH	R	V	PB	HB	Total	Rank
	Team																
Total	Team																

== Shooting ==
China secured several quota places in shooting for the 2028 Summer Olympics through the 2026 ISSF World Shooting Championships in Doha, Qatar, on 10 November 2026.

Men

Athlete	Event	Qualification		Final	
Athlete	Event	Points	Rank	Points	Rank
Hu Kai	10 metre air pistol				
Sheng Lihao	10 metre air rifle				
Qi Ying	trap				

Women

Athlete	Event	Qualification		Final	
Athlete	Event	Points	Rank	Points	Rank
Jiang Ranxin	10 metre air pistol				
Zhang Yueyue	25 metre pistol				
Han Jiayu	10 metre air rifle				
Jiang Yiting	skeet				

== Tennis ==
China entered one tennis player into the games. Wang Xiyu qualified for the games by winning the women's singles title at the 2026 Asian Games in Nagoya, Japan.

Athlete	Event	Round of 64	Round of 32	Round of 16	Quarterfinals	Semifinals	Final / BM	
Athlete	Event	Opposition Score	Opposition Score	Opposition Score	Opposition Score	Opposition Score	Opposition Score	Rank
Wang Xiyu	Women's singles							

== Triathlon ==
China entered one athletes for the games by winning the women's individual gold medal, therefore obtaining the sole spots for the events, at the 2026 Asian Games in Aichi Prefecture and Nagoya.

Athlete	Event	Time						Rank
Athlete	Event	Swim (1.5 km)	Trans 1	Bike (40 km)	Trans 2	Run (10 km)	Total	Rank
	Women's individual							
