= Japan at the 2028 Summer Olympics =

- IOC code: JPN
- NOC: Japanese Olympic Committee
- Website: www.joc.or.jp (in Japanese)

in Los Angeles, United States 14 July 2028 – 30 July 2028
- Competitors: 22 in 6 sports
- Medals: Gold 0 Silver 0 Bronze 0 Total 0

Summer Olympics appearances (overview)
- 1912; 1920; 1924; 1928; 1932; 1936; 1948; 1952; 1956; 1960; 1964; 1968; 1972; 1976; 1980; 1984; 1988; 1992; 1996; 2000; 2004; 2008; 2012; 2016; 2020; 2024; 2028

Japan is scheduled to compete at the 2028 Summer Olympics in Los Angeles, from 14 to 30 July 2028. Japan has participated in every edition of the Summer Olympic Games since 1912, with the exceptions of 1948, from which it was excluded following its role in the World War II, and the 1980, which it boycotted as part of the United States-led boycott.

== Competitors ==
The following is the list of number of competitors in the Games.

Sport	Men	Women	Total
Archery	1	0	1
Gymnastics	0	5	5
Shooting	0	1	1
Surfing	1	1	2
Triathlon	1	0	1
Volleyball	12	0	12
Total	15	7	22

== Archery ==
Japan qualified one archer for the games in mens individual recurve event for the Summer Olympics by virtue of the top two finish qualification finish at the 2026 Asian Games in Okazaki, Aichi.

=== Recurve ===
Athlete	Event	Ranking round		Round of 64	Round of 32	Round of 16	Quarterfinals	Semifinals	Final / BM	
Athlete	Event	Score	Seed	Opposition Score	Opposition Score	Opposition Score	Opposition Score	Opposition Score	Opposition Score	Rank
	Men's individual									

== Gymnastics ==
=== Rhythmic ===
Japan secured a spot in the group rhythmic gymnastics event after winning the silver medal, thereby earning one of three available qualification places awarded at the 2026 Rhythmic Gymnastics World Championships in Frankfurt, Germany.

Athletes	Event	Qualification				Final			
Athletes	Event	5 apps	3+2 apps	Total	Rank	5 apps	3+2 apps	Total	Rank
	Group								

== Shooting ==
Japanese athletes secured appearances by winning medals at the 2026 World Shooting Championships in Doha, Qatar.

Women

Athlete	Event	Qualification		Final	
Athlete	Event	Points	Rank	Points	Rank
Misaki Nobata	50 m rifle three positions				

== Surfing ==
Japanese surfers confirmed two shortboard quota places for the games. Two-times Olympian Kanoa Igarashi and Mirai Ikeda qualified for the Games, both by winning the gold medal in their respective event, through the 2026 Asian Games in Tahara.

Athlete	Event	Round 1		Round 2	Round 3	Quarterfinal	Semifinal	Final / BM	
Athlete	Event	Score	Rank	Opposition Result	Opposition Result	Opposition Result	Opposition Result	Opposition Result	Rank
Kanoa Igarashi	Men's shortboard								
Mirai Ikeda	Women's shortboard								

Qualification legend: R3 - Qualifies to elimination rounds; R2 - Qualifies to repechage round

== Triathlon ==
Japan qualified one athletes for the games by winning the men's individual gold medal, obtaining the only available spots for the events, at the 2026 Asian Games in Aichi Prefecture and Nagoya.

Athlete	Event	Time						Rank
Athlete	Event	Swim (1.5 km)	Trans 1	Bike (40 km)	Trans 2	Run (10 km)	Total	Rank
	Men's individual							

== Volleyball ==
Japanese team secured qualification berth in the mens event by winning the competition and claiming the direct Asian qualification at the 2026 AVC Men's Volleyball Continental Championship in Kitakyushu.

Team	Event	Group stage				Quarterfinal	Semifinal	Final / BM	
Team	Event	Opposition Score	Opposition Score	Opposition Score	Rank	Opposition Score	Opposition Score	Opposition Score	Rank
Japan men's	Men's tournament								
