= Saatva =

E-commerce mattress company

- Type: Private
- Industry: Mattresses
- Founded: May 6, 2010; 16 years ago May 11, 2010 (launched)
- Founders: Ron Rudzin; Ricky Joshi
- Headquarters: Whitestone, Queens; New York City
- Area served: United States
- Products: The Saatva Mattress; Loom and Leaf; Zenhaven
- Website: www.saatva.com

Saatva is an American privately held e-commerce company that specializes in luxury mattresses and is based in the Queens borough of New York City. Launched in 2010, Saatva was one of the first companies to implement the direct-to-consumer business model. The fastest growing major direct-to-consumer mattress brand from 2019 to 2021, Saatva is estimated to bring in over US$500M in direct annual revenue with no wholesale channels. In 2015, Saatva ranked #101 on Inc.'s list of the top 500 retailers for the year.

Unlike its direct-to-consumer competition, Saatva does not compress its mattresses in a box. Rather, the company provides free delivery, set up, and mattress removal.

Saatva has since expanded their offering to include luxury bedding, high-end bed frames and bedroom furniture, as well as a wide selection of mattresses in every major category. Saatva has flagship stores in New York City; Washington, D.C.; Los Angeles; and San Francisco. Saatva's retail footprint is expanding rapidly with new stores launching in markets such as Austin, Baltimore, Boston, Charlotte, Chicago, Dallas, Houston, Miami, Orlando, Paramus, Pasadena, Philadelphia, Portland (Oregon), San Diego, Scottsdale, Seattle, Tampa, and Westport CT.

== History ==
The company was founded in 2010 by furniture industry veteran Ron Rudzin and entrepreneur Ricky Joshi, who chose to base the company's name on the Sanskrit word सत्त्व (sattva), which means 'goodness' or 'purity'. Rather than open a brick and mortar store, the two opted to sell their mattresses exclusively online. Their products received positive reception from outlets such as Vogue and Forbes magazine and in 2015, placed on both Forbes's and Internet Retailer's guides for the top companies of that year.

In 2024 Saatva merged with their largest manufacturing partner, Bedding Industries of America, vertically integrating much of their operations.
