= Xiao Jiaruixuan =

Chinese sports shooter

Personal information
- Nationality: Chinese
- Born: 4 June 2002 (age 24) China

Sport
- Country: China
- Sport: Shooting
- Event: 25 m pistol (SP)
Medal record
Women's shooting
Representing China
Olympic Games
Bronze medal – third place	2020 Tokyo	25 m pistol
World Championships
Gold medal – first place	2022 Cairo	25 m standard pistol
Gold medal – first place	2026 Doha	25 m standard pistol
Gold medal – first place	2026 Doha	25 m standard pistol team
Asian Games
Gold medal – first place	2026 Aichi–Nagoya	25 m pistol
Gold medal – first place	2026 Aichi–Nagoya	25 m pistol team
Asian Championships
Gold medal – first place	2025 Shymkent	25 m pistol team
Silver medal – second place	2025 Shymkent	25 m pistol

Xiao Jiaruixuan (born 4 June 2002) is a Chinese sports shooter. She won the bronze medal in the women's 25-metre pistol event at the 2020 Summer Olympics held in Tokyo, Japan.
