= 2028 Summer Olympics =

Multi-sport event in Los Angeles, California, US

Games of the XXXIV Olympiad
- One of many variations of the logo; a general template is shown below
- Location: Los Angeles, United States
- Motto: Stars Align
- Events: 353 in 36 sports
- Opening: July 14, 2028
- Closing: July 30, 2028
- Stadium: Los Angeles Memorial Coliseum (simultaneous opening and closing ceremonies); SoFi Stadium (Note: Named "2028 Stadium" during the Games.) (simultaneous opening ceremony)

The 2028 Summer Olympics, officially the Games of the XXXIV Olympiad and commonly known as Los Angeles 2028 or LA28, is an upcoming international multi-sport event scheduled to take place from July 14 to 30, 2028, in the United States. Los Angeles will be the host city, with various events also scheduled to be held at other cities spread across the Greater Los Angeles area, plus two subsites in Oklahoma City.

Los Angeles had originally bid for the 2024 Summer Olympics. Following multiple withdrawals, the International Olympic Committee (IOC) approved a process to concurrently award the 2024 and 2028 Games to Los Angeles and Paris as the two remaining candidates; Paris was preferred as host for 2024, while Los Angeles agreed to host in 2028. Los Angeles was formally awarded the Games at the 131st IOC Session in Lima, Peru, on September 13, 2017. They will mark the fifth Summer Olympics, and ninth Olympics overall to be hosted by the United States. Los Angeles has previously hosted the Summer Olympics in 1932 and 1984, and will become the third three-time host city after London (1908, 1948, 2012) and Paris (1900, 1924, 2024), and the first non-European city to do so. These will be the first Summer Olympics held under the IOC presidency of Kirsty Coventry.

After debuting in 2020 as optional events, skateboarding, sport climbing, and surfing have been promoted to the Summer Olympics' core event program. The Games will feature the debut of flag football and squash as optional sports, joined by the return of baseball/softball, cricket (for the first time since 1900) and lacrosse (for the first time as a medal event since 1908).

== Bidding process ==
On September 16, 2015, the International Olympic Committee announced the candidature process and the five candidate cities for the 2024 Games: Budapest, Hamburg, Los Angeles, Paris, and Rome. Budapest, Hamburg, and Rome eventually withdrew, leaving only Los Angeles and Paris. A similar situation had already occurred during the bidding for the 2022 Winter Olympics when Kraków, Lviv, Oslo, and Stockholm withdrew, resulting in a two-way decision between Beijing, China, and Almaty, Kazakhstan, with Beijing ultimately declared the winner. On April 3, 2017, at the IOC convention in Denmark, Olympic officials met with bid committees from Los Angeles and Paris to discuss the possibility of naming two winners in the competition to host the 2024 Summer Games.

After these withdrawals, the IOC executive board met in Lausanne, Switzerland, on June 9, 2017, to discuss the 2024 and 2028 bid processes. The IOC formally proposed electing the 2024 and 2028 host cities at the same time in 2017, a proposal that an Extraordinary IOC Session approved on July 11, 2017, in Lausanne. The IOC set up a process where the Los Angeles and Paris 2024 bid committees and the IOC held meetings in July 2017 to decide which city would host in each of the two years.

Following the decision to award the 2024 and 2028 Games simultaneously, Paris was understood to be preferred for the 2024 Games, as it would also mark the centennial of the 1924 Summer Olympics in Paris. On July 31, 2017, the IOC announced Los Angeles as the sole candidate for 2028, with $1.8 billion of additional funding from the IOC, allowing Paris to be confirmed as the host for 2024. On August 11, 2017, the Los Angeles City Council voted unanimously to approve the bid. On September 11, 2017, Los Angeles received formal approval from the IOC's evaluation commission. On September 13, 2017, Los Angeles was formally awarded the 2028 Games following a unanimous vote by the IOC. IOC president Thomas Bach praised the LA bid for using a record-breaking number of existing and temporary facilities and for relying entirely on private funding.

On October 16, 2017, LA 2028 received official endorsement from the state of California. On August 29, 2018, Olympic officials arrived for a two-day visit that included meetings with local organizers and a tour of the city's newest venues. At the time, LMU and LA Times polls stated that more than 88% of Angelenos were in favor of the city hosting the 2028 Olympic and Paralympic Games. In March 2023, a poll conducted by Suffolk University and the LA Times indicated 57% of Angelenos believed the Olympics would be good for the city, while 20% indicated they thought it would have a negative impact.

== Development and preparations ==
The Los Angeles Organizing Committee for the 2028 Olympic and Paralympic Games was established on 31 July 2017. Casey Wasserman is president and as a chairperson of the committee. Reynold Hoover is CEO.

=== Transportation ===
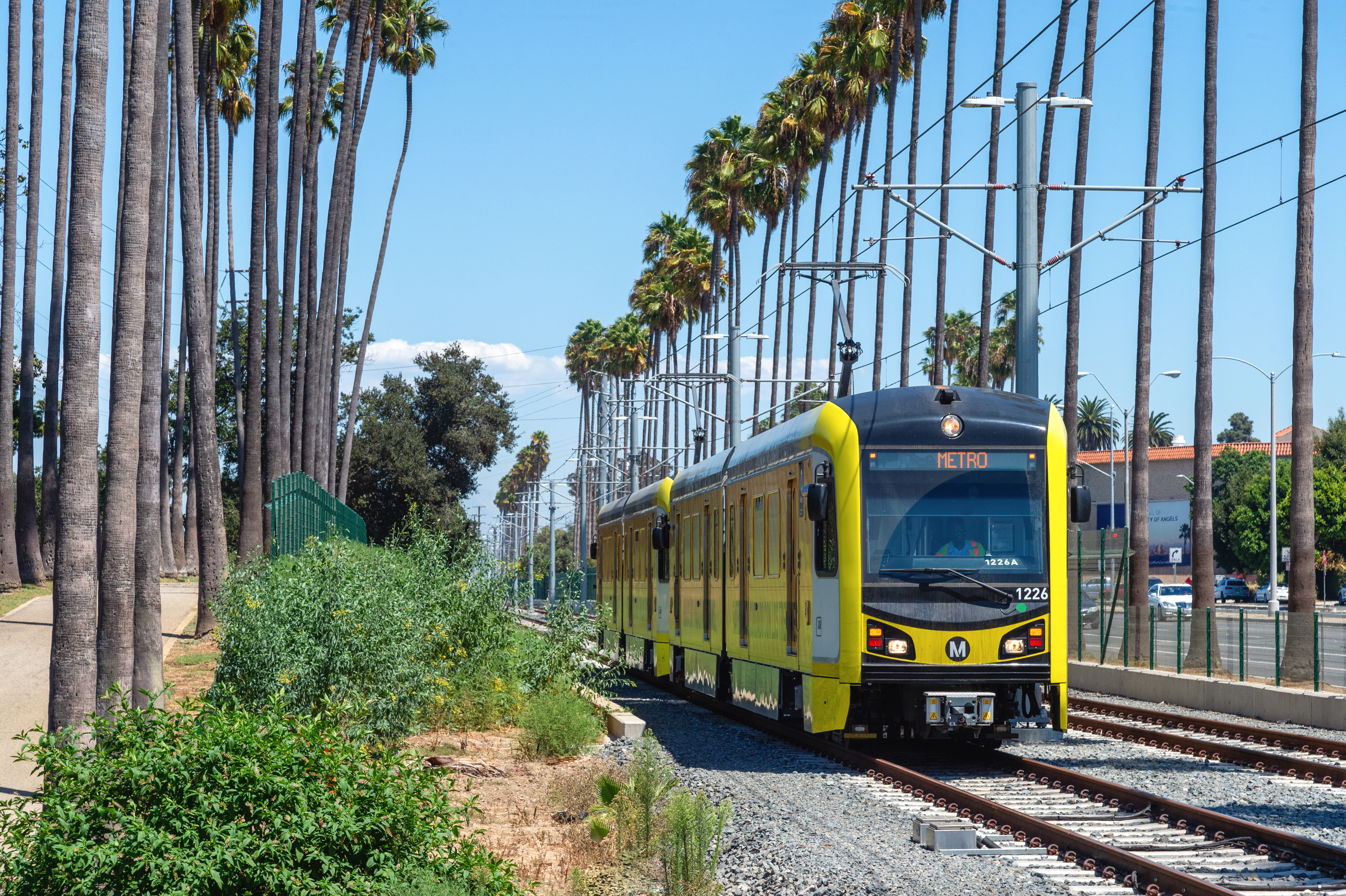
K Line train in Inglewood, a major events cluster

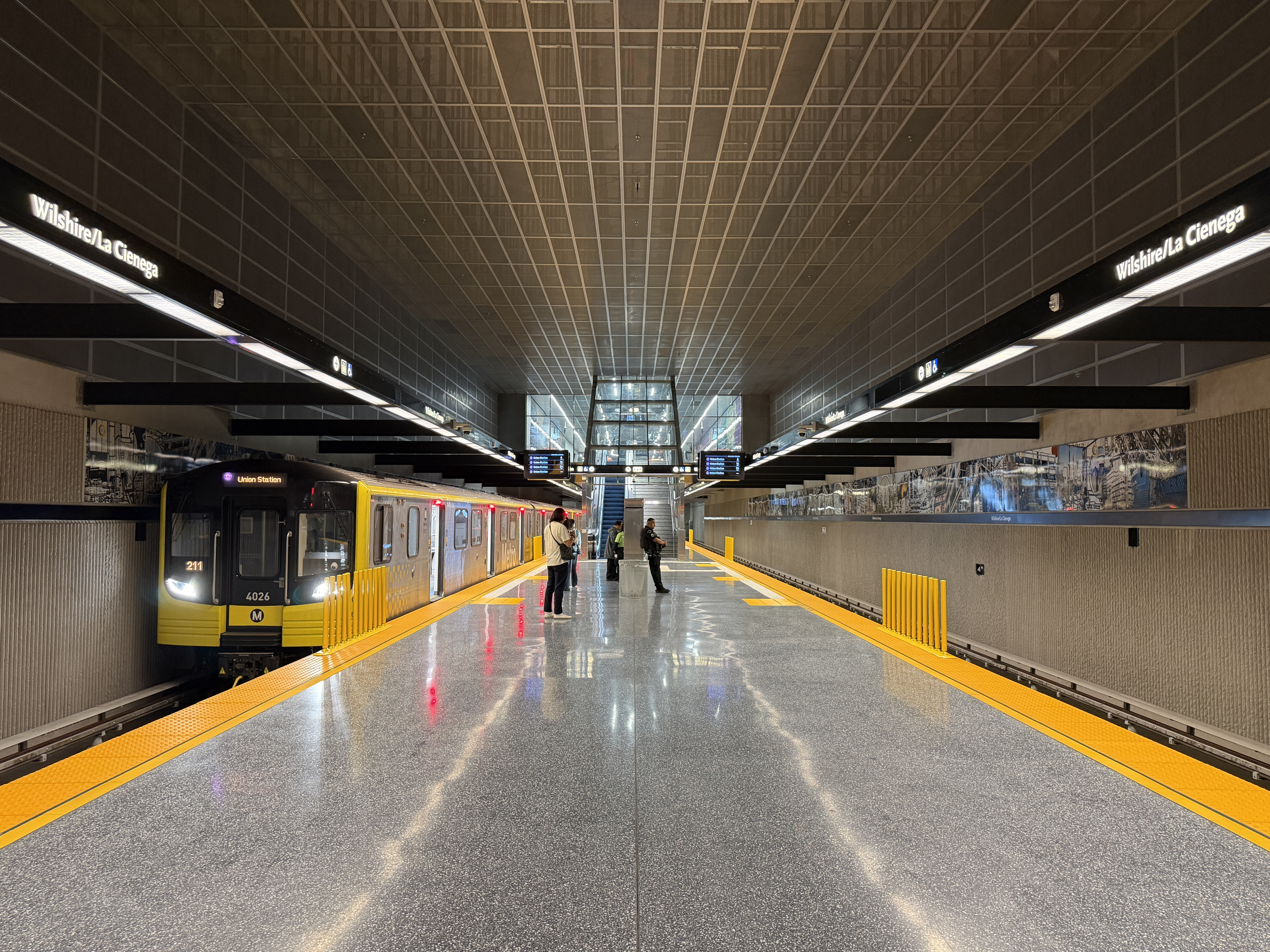
D Line train at Wilshire/La Cienega station in Beverly Hills.

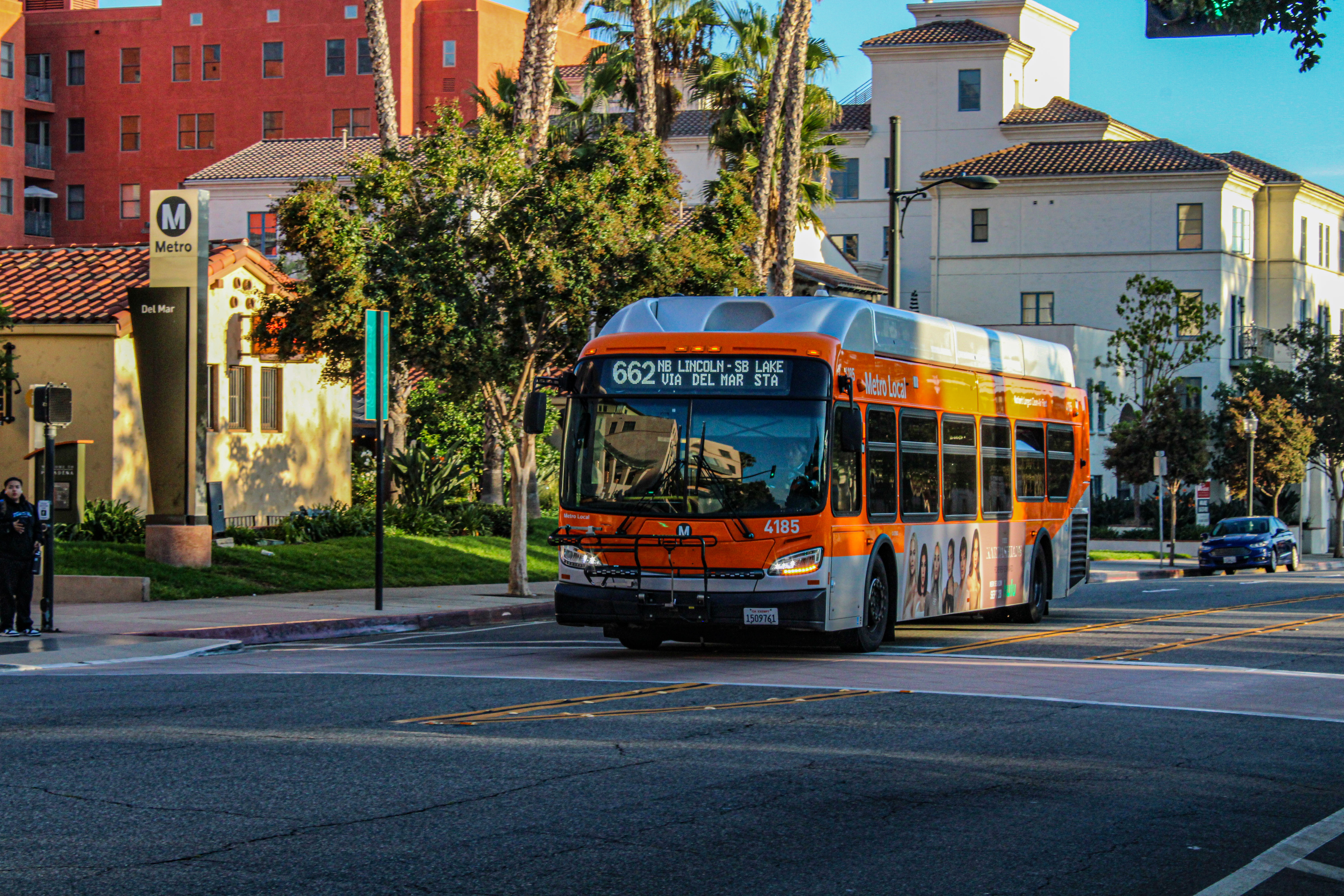
LA Metro local bus service

Los Angeles civic leaders initially announced a plan to make the 2028 Olympics "car-free", aiming to reduce congestion, shorten travel times, and comply with security restrictions that limit parking near venues. The Twenty-eight by '28 initiative, launched by former Mayor Eric Garcetti, aimed to complete 28 infrastructure projects before the Games. Most projects were already in planning stages, but the initiative accelerated their completion. Funding comes from Measure R and Measure M, countywide sales tax measures. Mayor Karen Bass also promoted strategies such as encouraging remote work during the event to reduce demand on the transportation network.

By March 2024, the original list of 28 projects was significantly revised, with 11 projects, including 5 rail line expansions, replaced by smaller projects considered more feasible to meet deadlines, including some projects that had already been completed. By late 2024, observers expressed concern that only 5.2% of LA Metro's $3.3 billion Olympic-related project list was funded, and several projects were running behind schedule. Officials also noted uncertainties related to government agency staffing, interagency coordination, and the late finalization of the Olympic venue list. These challenges led civic leaders to pivot away from a fully "car-free" Games toward a "transit-first" approach.

==== Rail projects ====
Several major rail expansions are underway to support Olympic transportation. The D Line extension is being completed in three phases: the first phase extending service from Wilshire/Western to Wilshire/La Cienega was completed in May 2026; the second phase will continue to Century City by late 2026; and the third phase will reach the West Los Angeles VA Medical Center by 2027, including a station near UCLA that will connect the Olympic Village to downtown venues. Construction began in 2014 and remains largely on schedule.

The Regional Connector, completed in 2023, links Metro's light rail lines in downtown Los Angeles, providing easier transfers between lines that serve Long Beach, the San Gabriel Valley, and Santa Monica, all of which will host Olympic competition venues. The K Line, which opened in October 2022 after multiple delays, connects the Crenshaw District, Inglewood, and Westchester, and will connect with a people mover at LAX, which is projected to open in January 6, 2027 after several postponements.

==== Bus fleet expansion ====
While many venues are located near existing rail lines, Los Angeles lacks the continuous, high-capacity subway system that supported past Olympic Games. Consequently, buses are expected to serve as the primary mode of transportation for most spectators. Los Angeles Metro and Olympic organizers estimate that an additional 2,700 buses will be needed, effectively doubling the current Metro fleet of 2,320 vehicles. Metro has requested that transit agencies nationwide donate buses near the end of their usable life for temporary Olympic service, potentially adding hundreds of vehicles. Costs are estimated at $700 million to $1 billion, and through the Vision 2028 plan, Metro is seeking federal grants and coordinating post-Games resale of buses to other cities. In February 2026, Metro announced that Congress has approved $94.3 million in mobility-related funding, including service planning, station experience enhancements, development of mobility hubs, light rail improvements, and planning and design for pedestrian access near Games venues as part of the Games Enhanced Transit System (GETS).

=== Budget ===
Building on the legacy of the 1984 Los Angeles Olympics–the first to generate a profit through innovative corporate sponsorship and private funding–the 2028 Los Angeles Games are heavily relying on a similar, fully private financial model. In April 2019, the estimated cost of the Games was assessed as being approximately $6.88 billion, with all the money coming from the private sector. The organizers adjusted the budget for inflation after LA, which originally bid for the 2024 Games, agreed to wait four more years.

The City of Los Angeles is the lead public guarantor. As of August 12, 2026, the city finalized the Enhanced City Resources Master Agreement (ECRMA), with LAOCOG committing to provide $270 million upfront for cost overruns. The city also committed an additional $270 million to cover shortfalls, once the initial up-front $270 is spent. The California legislature has empowered the governor to negotiate the next $250 million in public backup. The Games are expected to generate as much as they cost, with $2.5 billion coming in through sponsorships and nearly $2 billion earned through ticket sales. Average sports ticket prices for the Games have ranged between $28 in most sports and $3,350 for the mens basketball final. Over $2 billion in sponsorships were secured by late 2025 per the OCOG, surpassing the 2024 Paris Games more than two years early. The city councils concern in the ECRMA is the high cost for security. LAPD reports they will spend approximately $1.1 billion on policing alone. LA28 OCOG reports they are contingent on promises made by the Trump Administration on providing funding. The city council reported they cannot take the risk on the federal government not providing security funds and the OCOG not being clear on how the cost will be paid.

=== Security ===
Security will be handled by the U.S. federal government with an agreement signed by the Los Angeles Organizing Committee for the 2028 Olympic and Paralympic Games (LAOCOG) and Department of Homeland Security (DHS) in February 2020, but it will not be involved in the Games' funding, covering only the aforementioned security costs.

The Olympics are the second to take place in the United States following the September 11 attacks in 2001 and the Boston Marathon bombings in 2013. Like the 2002 Winter Olympics in Salt Lake City, the United States Department of Homeland Security will designate the Olympics a National Special Security Event (NSSE). Due to this designation, the United States Secret Service will be in charge of security and will head a single chain of command.

Casey Wasserman has stated that there will be no issues with the federal government on obtaining visas for athletes, security and delivery at the 144th IOC Session, emphasizing that they have received bipartisan support from all previous U.S. presidents, including Donald Trump. LA28 officials met with then President-elect Trump at Mar-a-Lago in January 2025 and his administration pledged to help Los Angeles recover from the wildfires, and hold "the greatest games". In July 2025, $1 billion in funding was earmarked for a Homeland Security Grant Program for federal security and planning costs as part of the One Big Beautiful Bill Act. LAPD reports estimates they will spent approximately $1.1 billion in policing alone. LAOCOG reports the funding for security is contingent on promises made by the Trump Administration on providing money. The city council reported they cannot take the risk on the federal government not providing security funds for LAPD costs and the OCOG not being clear on how the cost will be reimbursed.

=== Venues ===
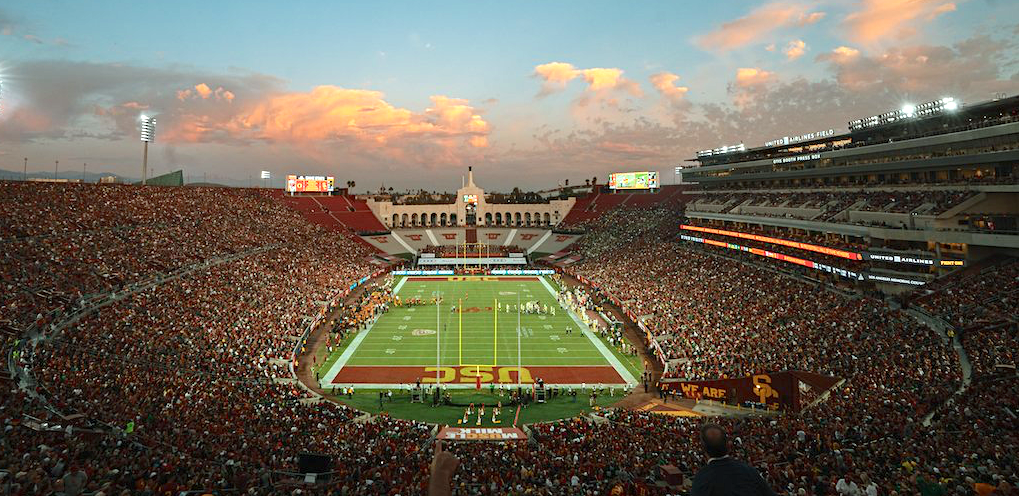
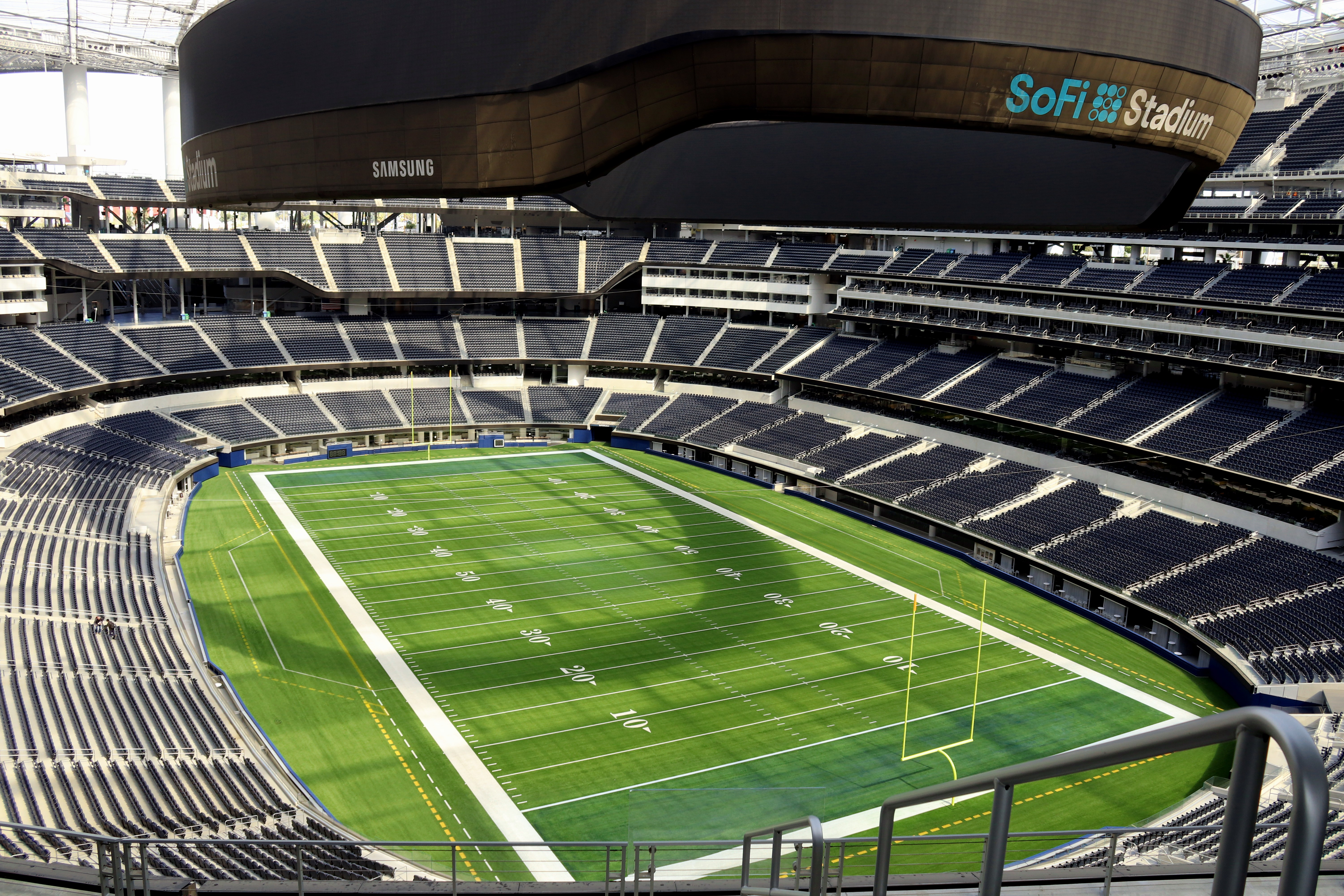
The Los Angeles Memorial Coliseum (left) and SoFi Stadium (named "2028 Stadium" during the games) (right) will host the ceremonies, as well as the athletics and swimming events respectively.

Like the 1984 Summer Olympics, a majority of the 2028 Summer Olympics will be hosted in venues around the Greater Los Angeles area, including new and temporary venues. The majority of venues are divided into clusters situated in downtown Los Angeles, Exposition Park, Inglewood, Long Beach, the San Fernando Valley, and Carson (at California State University, Dominguez Hills). Like the 1984 Games, the Olympic Village will be situated on the University of California, Los Angeles (UCLA) campus.

The Games will rely primarily on existing venues, including venues that had already been under construction or were planned regardless of the Games (such as SoFi Stadium and Intuit Dome in Inglewood). Only one new permanent venue—the Knight Riders Cricket Ground at the Fairplex in Pomona, California—was built specifically for the Games. Several events originally slated for temporary venues in Los Angeles County were relocated to pre-existing venues in Southern California (or, in the case of softball and canoe slalom, Oklahoma City) as part of moves to reduce the Games' cost. Diving was originally set for the historic LA84 Foundation/John C. Argue Swim Stadium (which was built for the 1932 Games), but was moved to the Rose Bowl Aquatics Center in Pasadena due to cost and safety concerns.

The Los Angeles Memorial Coliseum will host athletics and the Rose Bowl will host football (soccer), respectively. Both will become the first stadiums to have ever hosted three different Olympic Games. Crypto.com Arena will host gymnastics, and Intuit Dome will host basketball. BMO Stadium, which opened in 2018 as the home of Major League Soccer's Los Angeles FC, will host flag football and lacrosse. SoFi Stadium, which opened in 2020 as the home of the NFL's Los Angeles Rams and Los Angeles Chargers, will host swimming events. With a planned configuration for 38,000 spectators, SoFi Stadium will be the largest swimming venue in Olympic history. Long Beach (including the Long Beach Convention and Entertainment Center and waterfront) will host artistic and marathon swimming, beach volleyball, canoe, sailing, rowing, sport climbing, handball, and water polo. Riviera Country Club will host golf. Equestrian will return to Santa Anita Park, which hosted the event in 1984. Cricket will be hosted at the Knight Riders Cricket Ground.

Football will be hosted by an additional six cities: New York City (utilizing Etihad Park, which will open in 2027 as the new home of New York City FC), Nashville, Columbus, St. Louis, San Jose and San Diego. The match schedule, unveiled in March 2026, will allow the competition to progressively move east to west as teams advance to the final stages, minimizing travel demands.

=== Torch relay ===
In July 2025, LAOCOG CEO Reynold Hoover informed the California State Senate that the torch relay for LA 2028 planned to visit all 50 U.S. states, explaining that it would "bind the nation with LA and California". In September 2026, it was announced that the torch relay will begin in Atlanta, which hosted the last Summer Games in the U.S. in 1996. From there, the flame will visit all 50 U.S. states, before finally arriving in California in time for the opening ceremony.

=== Tickets ===
An estimated 14 million tickets will be available to purchase for the Games, two million more than that of Paris 2024. 1 million tickets will start at $28, with a third being under $100. Registration for the first ticket lottery opened in January 2026, with selected fans being able to purchase tickets starting in March and the general public from 9th-19th of April. The second general public ticket drop was between August 10th-20th. As of the end of August 2026, the LAOCOG announced they have sold a record 6 million tickets after the second drop closed.

== The Games ==
=== Ceremonies ===
The opening ceremonies will be held on July 14, 2028, and will be co-hosted by the Los Angeles Memorial Coliseum and SoFi Stadium. The Coliseum will solely host the closing ceremonies. Filmmaker and media executive Peter Rice was named "head of ceremonies and content" for LA 2028 in May of 2025, overseeing the ceremonies for both the Olympics and Paralympics. Wasserman did not specifically state a planned budget, but said that he would provide Rice with any resources he needs.

Ben Winston will serve as executive producer and creative director, alongside veteran ceremony producer Scott Givens; production will be overseen by FulFive, a joint venture between Winston and Given's respective companies Fulwell 73 and FiveCurrents.

Peter Rice stepped down as head of ceremonies and content to become the Chief Content Officer at Netflix. However, Rice will remain attached to the project as an executive producer. Kathleen Kennedy replaced Rice in October 2026. The established Hollywood producer, best known for leading Lucasfilm and producing blockbusters like Star Wars, E.T., and Jurassic Park, will oversee the creative development and execution of all four opening and closing ceremonies.

The concept of using both stadiums had been discussed by the Los Angeles bid committee as early as 2017; it proposed that a prologue to the opening ceremony could be held at the Coliseum (culminating with the launch of the final leg of the torch relay to Inglewood) with the rest of the protocol being simulcast from SoFi Stadium on screens, and the closing ceremony likewise beginning at SoFi Stadium and concluding at the Coliseum.

Referencing the U.S. film and television industry's status of an American cultural export, Wasserman explained that "when you think about what we expect of ourselves and what the world is going to expect of us, clearly we're the creative capital of the world and Hollywood is a big piece of that, but we better knock people's socks off."

=== Sports ===
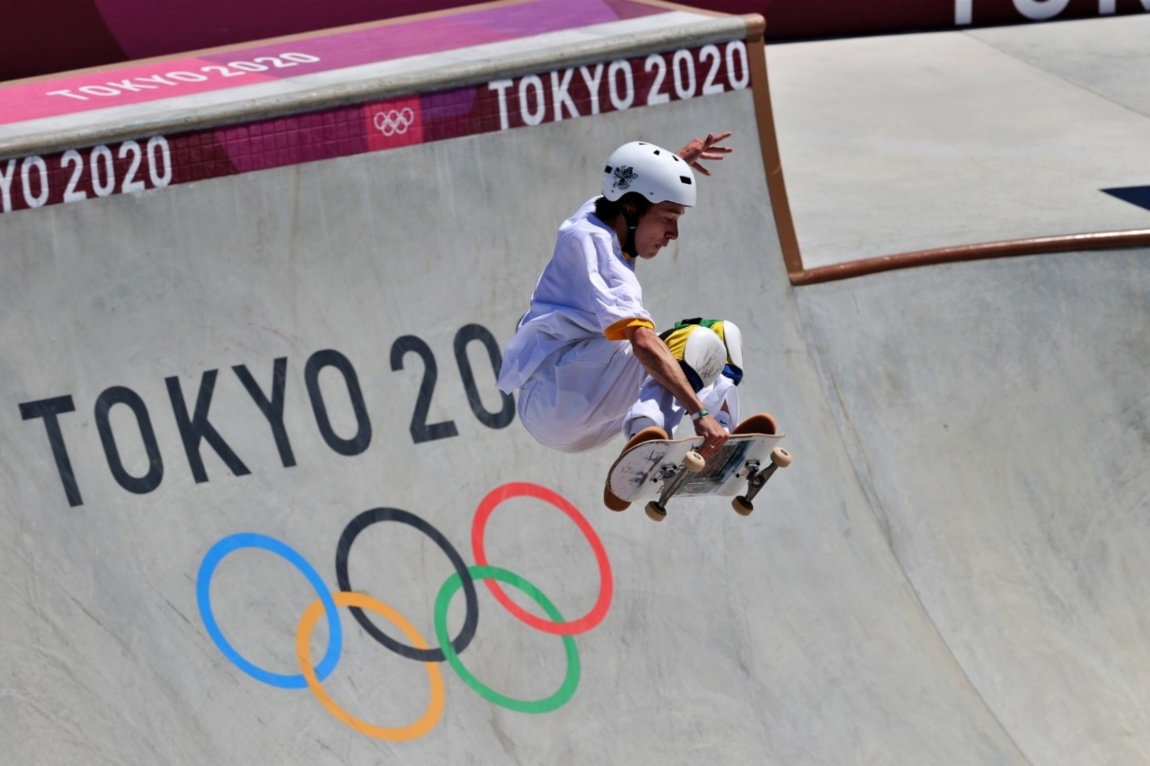
Skateboarding (pictured), surfing, and sport climbing will be inducted into the core Olympic program, after being selected as discretionary sports at the previous two editions of the games.

The 2028 Summer Olympics will feature 353 medal events in 36 sports and 51 disciplines, an increase of 24 events and four sports over the 2024 Summer Olympics; this includes 31 mandatory "core" sports, and five optional sports that were proposed by LAOCOG to help improve local interest. The core program consists of the 28 core sports contested since 2016, along with three newly-added sports—skateboarding, sport climbing, and surfing—which had been contested as optional sports in 2020 and 2024. The five optional sports will include the Olympic debuts of flag football (a non-contact variant of gridiron football) and squash, the return of baseball/softball for the first time since 2020, the return of cricket for the first time since 1900, and lacrosse for the first time since 1908.

Cricket will consist of men's and women's tournaments using the Twenty20 (T20) format, contested by six teams each. Flag football will consist of men's and women's tournaments. The National Football League (NFL) and Canadian Football League (CFL, whose regular season falls during the Olympics) both announced resolutions to facilitate participation by its professional players in the tournament, with the NFL's participation pending negotiations with the league's players union. Lacrosse will utilize the lacrosse sixes format.

Existing events will receive the following new disciplines and changes:

- The 4 × 100m mixed relay was added to athletics, while the marathon race walk mixed relay introduced in 2024 was dropped.
- 50m backstroke, butterfly, and breaststroke events were added to swimming, while the 10km event has been renamed "10km open water swimming," replacing the "marathon swimming" designation used in previous editions.
- Mixed team compound archery (the discipline's Olympic debut), artistic gymnastics, golf, and table tennis events were added, while the team artistic swimming event will also become a mixed team event by allowing male swimmers for the first time. With these changes, the 2028 Summer Olympics will be the first to have more female athletes than males.
- In rowing, beach sprint will replace the lightweight double sculls category, and consist of individual events for men and women as well as a mixed double sculls event.
- In sport climbing, the combined boulder-and-lead event was replaced by separate competitions for each discipline, expanding it to six medal events.
- The women's football tournament has been expanded from 12 to 16 teams due to the increasing popularity of the sport. The men's football tournament will be downsized from 16 to 12 teams.
- 3x3 basketball and women's water polo have both been expanded to 12 teams, the latter for parity with the men's tournament.
- One additional women's weight class was added to boxing for parity with the men's events.
- Weightlifting will be expanded to six bodyweight classes per-gender (with no change in athlete quota) to be better-aligned with the new International Weightlifting Federation (IWF) bodyweight classes, and disincentivize "extreme weight reduction".
- Aquatics
  - Artistic swimming (2)
  - Diving (8)
  - Open water swimming (2)
  - Swimming (41)
  - Water polo (2)
- Archery (6)
- Athletics (48)
- Badminton (5)
- Baseball/softball
  - Baseball (1)
  - Softball (1)
- Basketball
  - Basketball (2)
  - 3x3 basketball (2)
- Boxing (14)
- Canoeing
  - Canoe sprint (10)
  - Slalom canoeing (6)
- Cricket (2)
- Cycling
  - BMX freestyle (2)
  - BMX racing (2)
  - Mountain biking (2)
  - Road cycling (4)
  - Track cycling (12)
- Equestrian
  - Dressage (2)
  - Eventing (2)
  - Jumping (2)
- Fencing (12)
- Field hockey (2)
- Flag football (2)
- Football (2)
- Golf (3)
- Gymnastics
  - Artistic gymnastics (15)
  - Rhythmic gymnastics (2)
  - Trampoline (2)
- Handball (2)
- Judo (15)
- Lacrosse (2)
- Modern pentathlon (2)
- Rowing
  - Rowing (12)
  - Coastal rowing (3)
- Rugby sevens (2)
- Sailing (10)
- Shooting (15)
- Skateboarding (4)
- Sport climbing (6)
- Squash (2)
- Surfing (2)
- Table tennis (6)
- Taekwondo (8)
- Tennis (5)
- Triathlon (3)
- Volleyball
  - Beach volleyball (2)
  - Volleyball (2)
- Weightlifting (12)
- Wrestling
  - Freestyle wrestling (12)
  - Greco-Roman wrestling (6)

==== New sports ====
Since 2020, the program of the Summer Olympics has consisted of mandatory core sports that persist between Games, and up to six optional sports proposed by the organizing committee in order to improve local interest. On December 9, 2021, the IOC executive board proposed that skateboarding, sport climbing, and surfing, which all successfully debuted as optional sports at the 2020 Summer Olympics, and returned in the same capacity in 2024, be promoted to the core program of the 2028 Summer Olympics to replace boxing, modern pentathlon, and weightlifting, which were provisionally dropped from the program pending the resolution of governance issues, with the IOC setting a deadline of 2023:

- The International Boxing Association (IBA) was suspended by the IOC in 2019 for governance, financial, and corruption issues, which resulted in boxing at the 2020 and 2024 Games being overseen by an external, IOC task force. Governance concerns increased following the election of Umar Kremlev as its president in December 2020 due to his opposition to the independent appointment of judges and officials, and allegations of increasing Russian influence (including moving some of its operations to Russia, and his appointment of state-owned oil and gas company Gazprom as the organization's main sponsor in 2021). The IBA had also stifled attempts by candidates to challenge Kremlev's presidency, and lifted an IOC-recommended ban on Russian and Belarusian athletes (in response to the Russian invasion of Ukraine) in October 2022. A competing governing body known as World Boxing was established in April 2023 by a consortium of national federations that had expressed concerns over the impact of the Russian invasion of Ukraine on the IBA, and the future of boxing as an Olympic event. In June 2023, the IOC executive board voted to strip the IBA of its recognition, citing a lack of progress since the original suspension.
- The International Weightlifting Federation (IWF) faced issues with doping and governance, resulting in weightlifting being considered "provisional" for the 2024 Summer Olympics. In 2022, the IWF elected Mohammed Hasan Jalood as its new president, and he oversaw reforms to the organization, including agreeing to delegate its drug testing to the International Testing Agency and to participate in the Court of Arbitration for Sport.
- The Union Internationale de Pentathlon Moderne (UIPM) was seeking approval for its proposed replacement of show jumping in the modern pentathlon with obstacle course racing; the campaign to replace riding was motivated primarily by incidents during the women's modern pentathlon at the 2020 Summer Olympics, which saw German team coach Kim Raisner disqualified after she hit a horse that did not follow the instructions of jockey Annika Schleu. The UIPM ratified the changes in November 2022, and they are expected to officially take effect for senior competition after the 2024 Summer Olympics.

In August 2022, LAOCOG shortlisted nine proposed sports for consideration as optional events for these Olympics: baseball/softball, breaking (breakdance), cricket, flag football, karate, kickboxing, lacrosse, squash, and motorsport. On October 9, 2023, LAOCOG announced that they had officially submitted baseball/softball, cricket, flag football, lacrosse, and squash for consideration by the IOC. All five sports were approved at the 141st IOC Session in Mumbai, India. The IOC also reinstated modern pentathlon and weightlifting for the core program, citing that the sports' governing bodies had made sufficient efforts in carrying out reforms. The IOC withheld an immediate decision on boxing due to the IBA's expulsion and insufficient reach by World Boxing; in February 2025, the IOC granted provisional recognition to World Boxing, citing its progress on reach and commitments to integrity.

On March 20, 2025, at the 144th IOC Session in Greece, the IOC voted unanimously to approve a recommendation by the IOC executive board to reinstate boxing, with the event being sanctioned by World Boxing.

Notwithstanding the approval of cricket by the IOC, USA Cricket is not currently certified as a national governing body by the United States Olympic & Paralympic Committee (USOPC), which would be required in order for the sport to be contested. The ICC has previously warned that USA Cricket's governance would need to be reformed in order to meet USOPC standards, and began a process to "reset" the organization to meet them.

== Participating National Olympic Committees ==
As of November 2026, the following 51 nations have qualified. The United States' total reflects expected host country quota allocations. In 2025, under the leadership of Kirsty Coventry, the International Olympic Committee (IOC) is considering the return of Russia and Belarus to the Games, with both countries having been heavily restricted since 2022 due to the Russian invasion of Ukraine. On July 7, 2026, the IOC provisionally lifted its ban on the Russian Olympic Committee.

There have been calls from American and Canadian officials to allow a special dispensation for the Haudenosaunee confederacy to compete in the lacrosse sixes tournaments, due to the historical significance of lacrosse to its people. World Lacrosse recognizes Haudenosaunee as a member, and it has fielded men's and women's teams in its world championships, but it does not have a National Olympic Committee; its players could still theoretically play for the Canada or the United States teams, but most have stated that they would only play for Haudenosaunee.

Participating National Olympic Committees
- Australia (24)
- Belgium (25)
- Brazil (51)
- Bulgaria (1)
- Canada (32)
- China (21)
- Colombia (18)
- Croatia (1)
- Cuba (12)
- Czech Republic (2)
- Denmark (4)
- Dominican Republic (24)
- Egypt (13)
- France (9)
- Germany (11)
- Great Britain (24)
- Guatemala (1)
- Hong Kong (1)
- Hungary (1)
- India (53)
- Iran (1)
- Ireland (6)
- Italy (16)
- Japan (22)
- Kazakhstan (1)
- Kenya (4)
- Kuwait (2)
- Lesotho (1)
- Malaysia (2)
- Mexico (28)
- Morocco (2)
- Netherlands (21)
- New Zealand (3)
- Nigeria (2)
- Norway (1)
- Peru (1)
- Poland (12)
- Russia (7)
- Serbia (1)
- Slovakia (2)
- South Africa (15)
- South Korea (6)
- Spain (5)
- Sweden (9)
- Switzerland (6)
- Thailand (13)
- Tunisia (12)
- Turkey (12)
- United States (343) (host)
- Venezuela (24)
- Vietnam (1)

== Calendar ==
On July 13, 2025, the organizing committee published the first version of the competition schedule. On November 12, 2025, an updated comprehensive competition schedule by event was released, outlining when every medal event will take place during the upcoming Olympic Games in Los Angeles, with details across all confirmed sports and venues.

In order to facilitate use of SoFi Stadium for both the opening ceremonies and swimming, the scheduling of swimming and athletics events will be reversed. Athletics events will take place during the first week of the Games, during which SoFi Stadium will be reconfigured to uncover the pool in preparation for swimming competition during the second week. This will be the first time since the 1968 Summer Olympics in Mexico City that athletics competitions will take place in the first week of the Games.

All times and dates use Pacific Daylight Time (UTC-7).

OC	Opening ceremony	●	Event competitions	1	Gold medal events	CC	Closing ceremony

July 2028		10th Mon	11th Tue	12th Wed	13th Thu	14th Fri	15th Sat	16th Sun	17th Mon	18th Tue	19th Wed	20th Thu	21st Fri	22nd Sat	23rd Sun	24th Mon	25th Tue	26th Wed	27th Thu	28th Fri	29th Sat	30th Sun	Events
Ceremonies						OC																CC	—N/a
Aquatics	Artistic swimming																●	1	●	●	1		2
Aquatics	Diving							●	1	●	1	●	1	1			1	1	1	1			8
Aquatics	Open water swimming								1	1													2
Aquatics	Swimming													4	5	4	5	4	5	4	5	5	41
Aquatics	Water polo			●	●		●	●	●	●	●	●	●	1	1								2
Archery											●		1	●	●	1	1	1	1	1			6
Athletics							3	4	4	4	5	4	4	5	5	6			2		1	1	48
Badminton							●	●	●	●	●	●	1	1	1	2							5
Baseball/Softball	Baseball				●		●	●	●	●	1												1
Baseball/Softball	Softball														●	●	●	●	●	●	1		1
Basketball	Basketball			●	●		●	●	●	●	●	●	●	●	●	●	●	●	●	●	1	1	2
Basketball	3×3 Basketball							●	●	●	●	●	●	2									2
Boxing							●	●	●	●	●	●	●	●	●				2	2	6	4	14
Canoeing	Slalom					●	1	1	●	1	1	●	●	2									6
Canoeing	Sprint																●	3	●	3	4		10
Cricket				●	●		●	●	●	●	●	1		●	●	●	●	●	●	●	1		2
Cycling	Road cycling										2			1	1								4
Cycling	Track cycling																2	1	3	2	1	3	12
Cycling	BMX						●	2												●	2		4
Cycling	Mountain biking								1	1													2
Equestrian	Dressage											●	●	1		1							2
Equestrian	Eventing						●	●	●	2													2
Equestrian	Jumping																●	1		●	1		2
Fencing							2	2	2	1	1	1	1	1	1								12
Field hockey				●	●		●	●	●	●	●	●	●	●	●	●	●	●	●	1	1		2
Flag football							●	●	●	●	●	●	1	1									2
Football		●	●		●	●		●	●			●	●		●	●			●	1	1		2
Golf											●	●	●	1	●	1		●	●	●	1		3
Gymnastics	Artistic						●	●	1	1	1	1		3	3	4	1						15
Gymnastics	Rhythmic																		●	1	1		2
Gymnastics	Trampoline												2										2
Handball				●	●		●	●	●	●	●	●	●	●	●	●	●	●	1	1			2
Judo							2	2	2	2	2	2	2	1									15
Lacrosse																●	●	●	●	●	2		2
Modern pentathlon							●	●	1	1													2
Rowing	Rowing						●	●	2	2	2	2	2	2									12
Rowing	Coastal rowing															2	1						3
Rugby sevens				●	●		1	●	●	1													2
Sailing								●	●	●	2	2			●	●	●	2	2	2			10
Shooting							2	2	2	2	1	1	●	2	1	1	1						15
Skateboarding										●	1	1					●	1	1				4
Sport climbing																●	●	2	1	2	1		6
Squash							●	●	●	●	●	●	●	●	1	1							2
Surfing							●	●	●	2													2
Table tennis							●	●	1	1	1	●	●	1	1	●	●	●	●	●	1		6
Taekwondo																		2	2	2	2		8
Tennis											●	1	●	●	●	●	●	●	2	2			5
Triathlon							1	1				1											3
Volleyball	Beach volleyball						●	●	●	●	●	●	●	●	●	●	●	●	●	1	1		2
Volleyball	Volleyball						●	●	●	●	●	●	●	●	●	●	●	●	●	●	1	1	2
Weightlifting																	2	3	3	2	2		12
Wrestling																●	3	3	3	3	3	3	18
Daily medal events		0	0	0	0	0	12	14	18	22	21	17	15	30	20	23	17	25	29	31	41	18	353
Cumulative total		0	0	0	0	0	12	26	44	66	87	104	119	149	169	192	209	234	263	294	335	353	353

== Marketing ==
=== Branding ===
A reference version of the Games' emblem; the "A" in "LA" is interchanged with a variety of different designs.

On September 1, 2020, LAOCOG unveiled the emblem for the 2028 Summer Olympics, featuring the characters "LA" and "28" in a stacked layout. The "A" in "LA" was designed to be interchangeable, with numerous variations created in collaboration with athletes, artists, designers, and celebrities, including Billie Eilish, Lilly Singh, and Reese Witherspoon. Variants have also included designs referencing the 1984 Summer Olympics' "Stars in Motion" emblem, a version featuring the flags of France and the United States used during the Los Angeles handover presentation at the 2024 closing ceremony, and a "Black Mamba"-inspired design paying tribute to basketball player and two-time gold medalist Kobe Bryant. For the first time, variants of the emblem were also designed for promotional use by official partners, such as Delta Air Lines and broadcaster NBC (which replace the "A" with Delta's "widget" logo and the NBC peacock respectively).

LAOCOG chair Casey Wasserman stated that the variations were intended to "showcase our community's collective creativity and celebrate the diversity that makes us strong", reflecting a city that "defies a singular identity". Chief marketing officer Amy Gleeson said the emblem was designed to connect with an audience who will be in their 20s and 30s when the Games take place.

On March 28, 2026, LAOCOG unveiled the overall look of the Games, designed by the Culver City-based agency Koto. Entitled "LA in full bloom", the design is inspired by California's "superbloom" phenomenon, and includes 13 different "waves" of flora-inspired designs that can be assembled into looping patterns. It incorporates colors inspired by the Strelitzia (Bird of paradise)—the official flower of Los Angeles—including poppy, scarlet flax, bluebell, and sagebrush, and typefaces inspired by the city's street signage. LAOCOG stated that the designs reflected "the people, life, and culture of Los Angeles", and paid homage to the "bold, optimistic, Californian and unapologetically joyful" looks of past Summer Olympics hosted by Los Angeles.

=== Corporate sponsorship ===
LAOCOG partnered with NBCUniversal—owner of the U.S. media rights to the Olympics—to coordinate sponsorship sales for the Games. As part of the agreement and its sponsorship with the United States Olympic & Paralympic Committee (USOPC), NBCU parent company Comcast will be billed as a "Founding Partner" of LA 2028.

For the first time in Olympic and Paralympic history, venues will be permitted to carry naming rights during the Games, provided that their naming rights partner is a Worldwide Olympic and Paralympic Partner (TOP) or Founding Partner. The organising committee also plans to sell naming rights for the temporary venues. Executive director Paul Krekorian commented that the new policy is intended to "ensure the success of the Games while also protecting our taxpayers," while Wasserman expected the new naming rights arrangements to help build a new commercial model for the Olympics, just as Los Angeles had previously done in 1984.

Sponsors of the 2028 Summer Olympics
Worldwide Olympic Partners
- AB InBev (Michelob Ultra) (Note: While AB InBev's multi-year partnership is normally led by Corona Cero, Michelob Ultra will instead lead the sponsorship during the 2028 Games. This is due to Constellation Brands holding an exclusive license to import, market, and distribute Corona in the United States instead of AB InBev's U.S. subsidiary Anheuser-Busch.)
- Airbnb
- Alibaba Group
- Allianz
- Coca-Cola-Mengniu Dairy
- Deloitte
- JPMorgan Chase
- Omega SA
- Procter & Gamble
- Samsung Electronics
- TCL Technology
- Visa Inc.
Founding Partners
- Allstate
- Alphabet Inc. (Google)
- Chase Bank
- Comcast
- Delta Air Lines
- Fanatics, Inc.
- Honda
- Intuit
- Korn Ferry
- Nike, Inc.
- Starbucks
Official Partners
- AECOM
- CDW
- Cisco
- Eli Lilly and Company
- Phillips 66
- Sunbelt Rentals
- Uber
Official Supporters
- Archer Aviation
- Autodesk
- Cedars-Sinai Medical Center
- Cooley LLP
- Dick's Sporting Goods
- Gibson Dunn
- Guild Education
- Highland Electric Fleets
- Mars Snacking
- Musco Lighting
- Oakley, Inc.
- Oura Health
- Pennymac
- Ralph Lauren Corporation
- Rapiscan Systems
- Saatva
- Sidley Austin
- Snowflake Inc.
- The Hershey Company
- T-Mobile for Business
Official Ticketing and Hospitality Partners
- AXS-CTS Eventim
- On Location

== Broadcasting rights ==
In the United States, the Games will be broadcast by NBCUniversal and Versant properties, as part of a long-term contract with the IOC until 2036 after it was extended for a further four years in 2024, with parent company Comcast agreeing to provide Olympic Broadcasting Services (OBS) with support for in-venue distribution, as well as collaborating on digital advertising opportunities in the U.S. among others. In January 2026, Comcast and NBCUniversal spun off CNBC, USA Network, and other cable operations into a new company called Versant, with an agreement being made for those cable channels to continue airing Olympics coverage. The Warner Bros. Ranch in Burbank will serve as the International Broadcast Centre, while the new Hollywood Park Studios in Inglewood will serve as the press center.

== See also ==
- 2028 Summer Paralympics
- Olympic Games held in the United States
  - 1904 Summer Olympics – St. Louis
  - 1932 Summer Olympics – Los Angeles
  - 1932 Winter Olympics – Lake Placid
  - 1960 Winter Olympics – Squaw Valley
  - 1980 Winter Olympics – Lake Placid
  - 1984 Summer Olympics – Los Angeles
  - 1996 Summer Olympics – Atlanta
  - 2002 Winter Olympics – Salt Lake City
  - 2028 Summer Olympics – Los Angeles
  - 2034 Winter Olympics – Salt Lake City
- List of IOC country codes

== Notes ==
Summer Olympics
Preceded by Paris	XXXIV Olympiad; Los Angeles; 2028	Succeeded by Brisbane
