= Women's T20 World Cup records =

This is a list of records that have been broken over the tournaments of the Women's T20 World Cup.

== Notation ==
Team notation

- (200–3) indicates that a team scored 200 runs for three wickets and the innings was closed, either due to a successful run chase or if no overs remained (or are able) to be bowled.
- (200) indicates that a team scored 200 runs and was all out, either by losing all ten wickets or by having one or more batsmen unable to bat and losing the remaining wickets.

Batting notation

- (50) indicates that a batsman scored 50 runs and was out.
- (50*) indicates that a batsman scored 50 runs and was not out.

Bowling notation

- (5–50) indicates that a bowler has captured five wickets while giving away 50 runs.

Currently playing

- Record holders who are currently playing T20Is or streaks that are still active and can change have a † next to their name.

== Team records ==
=== Team wins, losses, ties, and no results ===
Teams	Matches	Won	Lost	Tie+Win	Tie+Lost	No result	% Win	Span	
Teams	Matches	Won	Lost	Tie+Win	Tie+Lost	No result	% Win	First season	Last season
Australia	52	42	9	1	0	0	82.69%	2009	2026
Bangladesh	28	5	23	0	0	0	17.85%	2014	2026
England	45	34	10	0	1	0	75.55%	2009	2026
India	43	24	19	0	0	0	55.81%	2009	2026
Ireland	20	0	20	0	0	0	00.00%	2014	2026
Netherlands	3	0	3	0	0	0	00.00%	2026	2026
New Zealand	45	30	15	0	0	0	66.66%	2009	2026
Pakistan	39	9	29	0	0	1	23.68%	2009	2026
Scotland	7	1	6	0	0	0	14.28%	2024	2026
South Africa	42	20	22	0	0	0	47.61%	2009	2026
Sri Lanka	38	11	27	0	0	0	28.94%	2009	2026
Thailand	4	0	3	0	0	1	00.00%	2020	2020
West Indies	42	26	16	0	0	0	61.90%	2009	2026
Last updated: 21 June 2026 Tie+W and Tie+L indicates matches tied and then won or lost in a tiebreaker such as a bowlout or one-over-eliminator ("Super Over") The result percentage excludes no results and counts ties (irrespective of a tiebreaker) as half a win

=== Result records ===
==== Greatest win margin (by runs) ====
Margin	Winning team	Score	Opponent	Score	Venue	Date
114 runs	England	213/5	Pakistan	99/9	Newlands Cricket Ground, Cape Town, South Africa	21 February 2023
113 runs	South Africa	195/3	Thailand	82	Manuka Oval, Canberra, Australia	28 February 2020
113 runs	Australia	199/7	Pakistan	86	Headingley Cricket Ground, Leeds, England	23 June 2026
102 runs	New Zealand	162/3	Sri Lanka	60	Boland Park, Paarl, South Africa	19 February 2023
98 runs	England	176/2	Thailand	78/7	Manuka Oval, Canberra, Australia	28 February 2020
98 runs	Australia	219/6	Netherlands	121/3	Rose Bowl, Southampton, England	20 June 2026
Last updated: 23 June 2026

==== Greatest win margin (by wickets) ====
Margin	Winning team	Score	Opponent	Score	Venue	Date
10 wickets	England	113/0	India	112/8	County Ground, Taunton, England	11 June 2009
10 wickets	West Indies	71/0	South Africa	70/8	Galle International Stadium, Galle, Sri Lanka	30 September 2012
10 wickets	Australia	113/0	Sri Lanka	112/8	St George's Park, Gqeberha, South Africa	16 February 2023
10 wickets	South Africa	117/0	Bangladesh	113/6	Newlands Cricket Ground, Cape Town, South Africa	21 February 2023
10 wickets	South Africa	117/0	West Indies	113/6	Dubai International Cricket Stadium, Dubai, United Arab Emirates	4 October 2024
10 wickets	England	113/0	Scotland	109/6	Sharjah Cricket Stadium, Sharjah, United Arab Emirates	13 October 2024
Last updated: 16 November 2024

==== Lowest win margin (by runs) ====
Margin	Winning team	Score	Opponent	Score	Venue	Date
1 run	Sri Lanka	108	Pakistan	107	Warner Park, Basseterre, Saint Kitts and Nevis	6 May 2010
1 run	Pakistan	98/9	India	97/8	Galle International Stadium, Galle, Sri Lanka	1 October 2012
2 runs	West Indies	122/8	England	120/9	Warner Park, Basseterre, Saint Kitts and Nevis	7 May 2010
2 runs	Pakistan	96/7	India	77/6 (Note: Pakistan won by D/L method)	Feroz Shah Kotla Ground, New Delhi, India	19 March 2016
Last updated: 21 November 2024

==== Tied matches ====
Team1	Score	Team2	Score	Venue	Date
England	104 (17.3 overs)	Australia	104 (19.4 overs)	Warner Park, Basseterre, Saint Kitts and Nevis	5 May 2010
Last updated: 16 November 2024

=== Team scoring records ===
==== Highest innings totals ====
Score	Team	Opponent	Venue	Date
219/1 (20.0 overs)	England	Sri Lanka	Edgbaston Cricket Ground, Birmingham, England	12 June 2026
219/6 (20.0 overs)	Australia	Netherlands	Rose Bowl, Southampton, England	20 June 2026
213/5 (20.0 overs)	England	Pakistan	Newlands Cricket Ground, Cape Town, South Africa	21 February 2023
209/5 (20.0 overs)	India	Netherlands	Headingley Cricket Ground, Leeds, England	17 June 2026
208/1 (20.0 overs)	South Africa	Netherlands	Bristol County Ground, Bristol, England	25 June 2026
Last updated: 25 June 2026

==== Lowest innings totals ====
Score	Team	Opponent	Venue	Date
46 (14.4 overs)	Bangladesh	West Indies	Providence Stadium, Providence, Guyana	9 November 2018
56 (11.4 overs)	Pakistan	New Zealand	Dubai International Cricket Stadium, Dubai, United Arab Emirates	14 October 2024
58/9 (20.0 overs)	Bangladesh	England	Sylhet International Cricket Stadium, Sylhet, Bangladesh	28 March 2014
60 (16.5 overs)	Pakistan	England	County Ground, Taunton, England	16 June 2009
60 (15.5 overs)	Sri Lanka	New Zealand	Boland Park, Paarl, South Africa	19 February 2023
Last updated: 21 November 2024

==== Highest match aggregate ====
Score	Teams	Venue	Date
362–12 (40.0 overs)	England (200/5) v Scotland (162/7)	Headingley Cricket Ground, Leeds, England	20 June 2026
354–14 (40.0 overs)	India (194/5) v New Zealand (160/9)	Providence Stadium, Providence, Guyana	9 November 2018
351–11 (40.0 overs)	England (219/1) v Sri Lanka (132)	Edgbaston Cricket Ground, Birmingham, England	12 June 2026
342–8 (39.0 overs)	India (170/4) v Australia (172/4)	Lord's, London, England	28 June 2026
340–9 (40.0 overs)	Australia (219/6) v Netherlands (121/3)	Rose Bowl, Southampton, England	20 June 2026
Last updated: 28 June 2026

==== Lowest match aggregate ====
Score	Teams	Venue	Date
92–11 (18.3 overs)	Sri Lanka (50/3) vs West Indies (42/8)	Galle International Stadium, Galle, Sri Lanka	28 September 2012
136–13 (28.2 overs)	Pakistan (65/9) v New Zealand (71/4)	Warner Park Sporting Complex, Basseterre, Saint Kitts and Nevis	10 May 2010
140–12 (29.3 overs)	Bangladesh (76/9) v England (64/3)	Daren Sammy Cricket Ground, Gros Islet, Saint Lucia	12 November 2018
141–8 (29.4 overs)	South Africa (70/8) v West Indies (71/0)	Galle International Stadium, Galle, Sri Lanka	30 September 2012
152–18 (34.4 overs)	West Indies (106/8) v Bangladesh (46)	Providence Stadium, Providence, Guyana	9 November 2018
Last updated: 21 November 2024

==== Highest run chase ====
Score	Target	Team	Opposition	Venue	Date
172–4 (19.0 overs)	171	Australia	India	Lord's, London, England	28 June 2026
165–2 (19.3 overs)	164	England	Australia	The Oval, London, England	19 June 2009
164–1 (17.2 overs)	164	England	New Zealand	The Oval, London, England	27 June 2026
163–3 (19.5 overs)	163	West Indies	New Zealand	Rose Bowl, Southampton, England	13 June 2026
161–4 (19.1 overs)	159	South Africa	India	Old Trafford Cricket Ground, Manchester, England	21 June 2026
Last updated: 28 June 2026

==== Lowest score defended ====
Score	Team	Opposition	Opposition Score	Venue	Date
91 (18.2 overs)	New Zealand	Bangladesh	74 (19.5 overs)	Junction Oval, Melbourne, Australia	29 February 2020
97–7 (20.0 overs)	Sri Lanka	Bangladesh	72 (20.0 overs)	Daren Sammy Cricket Ground, Gros Islet, Saint Lucia	14 November 2018
98–9 (20.0 overs)	Pakistan	India	97–8	Galle International Stadium, Galle, Sri Lanka	1 October 2012
103–8 (20.0 overs)	West Indies	Pakistan	99–5	MA Chidambaram Stadium, Chennai, India	16 March 2016
106–8 (20.0 overs)	New Zealand	Bangladesh	103–8 (20.0 overs)	Kensington Oval, Bridgetown, Barbados	16 May 2010
Last updated: 21 November 2024 The result includes only full 20-over matches

==== Most extras in an innings ====
An extra is a run scored by a means other than a batsman hitting the ball. Other than runs scored off the bat from a no-ball, a batsman is not given credit for extras and the extras are tallied separately on the scorecard and count only towards the team's score.

Extras	Team total	Team	Opposition	Form	Date
24	99/8	Sri Lanka	South Africa	24 (2 b, 3 lb, 19 wd, 0 nb)	12 November 2018
23	99/5	West Indies	Sri Lanka	23 (8 b, 1 lb, 13 wd, 1 nb)	21 June 2026
21	199/7	Australia	Pakistan	21 (8 b, 2 lb, 11 wd}	23 June 2026
20	180/5	New Zealand	West Indies	20 (0 b, 4 lb, 15 wd, 1 nb)	14 May 2010
Last updated: 23 June 2026

== Individual records ==
=== Batting ===
==== Most runs ====
Runs	Player	Mat	Inn	HS	Avg	100s	50s	Period
1,254	(New Zealand) Suzie Bates	45	44	94*	31.35	0	8	2009–2026
1,104	(Cricket West Indies) Stafanie Taylor†	40	39	59	38.06	0	6	2009–2026
1,008	(Australia) Alyssa Healy	42	39	83	28.80	0	7	2010–2024
992	(Australia) Meg Lanning	35	32	126	39.68	1	4	2010–2023
990	(Australia) Beth Mooney†	35	32	81*	43.04	0	9	2016–2026
Last updated: 8 July 2026

==== Highest individual scores ====
Runs	Player	Balls	4s	6s	SR	Opposition	Venue	Date
126	(Australia) Meg Lanning	65	18	4	193.84	Ireland	Sylhet International Cricket Stadium, Sylhet, Bangladesh	27 March 2014
114*	(South Africa) Tazmin Brits	69	15	3	165.21	Netherlands	Bristol County Ground, Bristol, England	25 June 2026
112*	(Cricket West Indies) Deandra Dottin	45	7	9	248.88	South Africa	Warner Park Sporting Complex, Basseterre, Saint Kitts & Nevis	5 May 2010
108*	(England) Heather Knight	66	13	4	163.63	Thailand	Manuka Oval, Canberra, Australia	26 February 2020
106*	(Sri Lanka) Chamari Athapaththu	61	17	2	173.77	Ireland	Bristol County Ground, Bristol, England	23 June 2026
Last updated: 26 June 2026

==== Highest average ====
Average	Player	Inn	NO	Runs	Span
46.00	(South Africa) Tazmin Brits†	16	3	598	2023–2026
45.95	(England) Nat Sciver-Brunt†	31	10	965	2014–2026
43.04	(Australia) Beth Mooney†	32	9	990	2016–2026
40.33	(India) Mithali Raj	23	5	726	2009–2018
39.68	(Australia) Meg Lanning	32	7	992	2012–2023
Last updated: 8 July 2026; (Minimum 10 innings)

==== Highest strike rate ====
Strike rate	Player	Inn	Runs	BF	Span
129.39	(Australia) Alyssa Healy	39	1,008	779	2010–2024
129.29	(England) Danni Wyatt-Hodge†	34	790	611	2014–2026
124.53	(Cricket West Indies) Deandra Dottin†	40	868	697	2009–2026
122.15	(England) Nat Sciver-Brunt†	31	965	790	2014–2026
121.77	(Australia) Beth Mooney†	32	990	813	2016–2026
Last updated: 8 July 2026; (Minimum 500 balls faced)

==== Most 50+ scores ====
50+ Scores	Player	Mat	Inn	Runs	HS	Span
9	(England) Nat Sciver-Brunt†	33	31	965	81*	2014–2026
9	(Australia) Beth Mooney†	35	32	990	81*	2016–2026
8	(New Zealand) Suzie Bates	45	44	1,254	94*	2009–2026
7	(Australia) Alyssa Healy	42	39	1,008	83	2010–2024
6	(India) Smriti Mandhana†	30	30	729	87	2014–2026
6	(India) Harmanpreet Kaur†	44	38	867	103	2009–2026
6	(Cricket West Indies) Stafanie Taylor†	40	39	1,104	59	2009–2026
Last updated: 8 July 2026

==== Fastest 100 ====
Balls	Player	Opposition	Venue	Date
38	(Cricket West Indies) Deandra Dottin	South Africa	Warner Park Sporting Complex, Basseterre, Saint Kitts & Nevis	5 May 2010
49	(India) Harmanpreet Kaur	New Zealand	Providence Stadium, Providence, Guyana	9 November 2018
53	(Australia) Meg Lanning	Ireland	Sylhet International Cricket Stadium, Sylhet, Bangladesh	27 March 2014
58	(Sri Lanka) Chamari Athapaththu	Ireland	Bristol County Ground, Bristol, England	23 June 2026
59	(South Africa) Lizelle Lee	Thailand	Manuka Oval, Canberra, Australia	28 February 2020
Last updated: 23 June 2026

==== List of 100s ====
No.	Player	Runs	Balls	4s	6s	S/R	Inns.	Opposition	Venue	Edt.	Date	Result	Ref
1	(Cricket West Indies) Deandra Dottin	112*	45	7	9	248.88	1	South Africa	Basseterre, St. Kitts and Nevis	2010	5 May 2010	Won	
2	(Australia) Meg Lanning	126	65	18	4	193.84	1	Ireland	Sylhet, Bangladesh	2014	27 March 2014	Won	
3	(India) Harmanpreet Kaur	103	51	7	8	201.96	1	New Zealand	Providence, Guyana	2018	9 November 2018	Won	
4	(England) Heather Knight	108*	66	13	4	163.63	1	Thailand	Canberra, Australia	2020	26 February 2020	Won	
5	(South Africa) Lizelle Lee	101	60	16	3	168.33	1	Thailand	Canberra, Australia	2020	28 February 2020	Won	
6	(Pakistan) Muneeba Ali	102	68	14	0	150.00	1	Ireland	Cape Town, South Africa	2023	15 February 2023	Won	
7	(England) Danni Wyatt-Hodge	105*	62	13	1	169.35	1	Sri Lanka	Birmingham, England	2026	12 June 2026	Won	
8	(Sri Lanka) Chamari Athapaththu	106*	61	17	2	173.77	2	Ireland	Bristol, England	2026	23 June 2026	Won	
9	(South Africa) Tazmin Brits	114*	61	15	3	165.21	1	Netherlands	Bristol, England	2026	25 June 2026	Won	
Last updated: 26 June 2026

==== Most sixes ====
Sixes	Player	Inn	Span
32	(Cricket West Indies) Deandra Dottin†	40	2009–2026
23	(New Zealand) Sophie Devine	41	2009–2026
22	(India) Harmanpreet Kaur†	38	2009–2026
17	(Cricket West Indies) Stafanie Taylor†	39	2009–2026
15	(India) Shafali Verma†	19	2020–2026
15	(Australia) Ashleigh Gardner†	25	2010–2026
15	(Australia) Alyssa Healy	39	2010–2024
Last updated: 30 June 2026

==== Most fours ====
Fours	Player	Inn	Span
136	(New Zealand) Suzie Bates	44	2009–2026
132	(Australia) Alyssa Healy	39	2010–2024
122	(Sri Lanka) Chamari Athapaththu†	37	2009–2026
121	(Australia) Meg Lanning	32	2012–2024
118	(Australia) Beth Mooney†	32	2009–2026
Last updated: 8 July 2026

==== Highest strike rates in an innings ====
Strike rate	Runs (balls)	Batsman	Opposition	Venue	Date
291.66	35* (12)	(South Africa) Chloe Tryon	Ireland	Sylhet International Cricket Stadium, Sylhet, Bangladesh	29 March 2014
290.00	29 (10)	(South Africa) Sune Luus	Ireland	Sylhet International Cricket Stadium, Sylhet, Bangladesh	29 March 2014
272.72	30* (11)	(England) Dani Gibson	Scotland	Headingley Cricket Ground, Leeds, England	20 June 2026
261.53	34* (13)	(New Zealand) Sara McGlashan	Ireland	Sylhet International Cricket Stadium, Sylhet, Bangladesh	25 March 2014
248.88	112* (45)	(Cricket West Indies) Deandra Dottin	South Africa	Warner Park Sporting Complex, Basseterre, Saint Kitts & Nevis	5 May 2010
Qualification: Minimum of 25 runs, number in parentheses represents the number of balls the batsman faced during the innings. Last updated: 20 June 2026

==== Most sixes in an innings ====
Sixes	Player	Opposition	Venue	Date
9	(Cricket West Indies) Deandra Dottin	South Africa	Warner Park Sporting Complex, Basseterre, Saint Kitts & Nevis	5 May 2010
8	(India) Harmanpreet Kaur	New Zealand	Providence Stadium, Providence, Guyana	9 November 2018
5	(Australia) Elyse Villani	Pakistan	Sylhet International Cricket Stadium, Sylhet, Bangladesh	29 March 2014
5	(Australia) Alyssa Healy	India	Melbourne Cricket Ground, Melbourne, Australia	8 March 2020
Last updated: 21 November 2024

==== Most fours in an innings ====
Fours	Player	Opposition	Venue	Date
18	(Australia) Meg Lanning	Ireland	Sylhet International Cricket Stadium, Sylhet, Bangladesh	27 March 2014
17	(Sri Lanka) Chamari Athapaththu	Ireland	Bristol County Ground, Bristol, England	23 June 2026
16	(South Africa) Lizelle Lee	Thailand	Manuka Oval, Canberra, Australia	28 February 2020
15	(South Africa) Tazmin Brits	Netherlands	Bristol County Ground, Bristol, England	25 June 2026
15	(England) Danni Wyatt-Hodge	New Zealand	The Oval, London, England	27 June 2026
Last updated: 28 June 2026

==== Most runs through boundaries in an innings ====
Runs	Player	Balls	4s	6s	SR	Opposition	Venue	Date
96	(Australia) Meg Lanning	65	18	4	193.84	Ireland	Sylhet International Cricket Stadium, Sylhet, Bangladesh	27 March 2014
82	(Cricket West Indies) Deandra Dottin	45	7	9	248.88	South Africa	Warner Park Sporting Complex, Basseterre, Saint Kitts & Nevis	5 May 2010
82	(South Africa) Lizelle Lee	60	16	3	168.33	Thailand	Manuka Oval, Canberra, Australia	28 February 2020
80	(Sri Lanka) Chamari Athapaththu	61	17	2	173.77	Ireland	Bristol County Ground, Bristol, England	23 June 2026
78	(South Africa) Tazmin Brits	69	15	3	165.21	Netherlands	Bristol County Ground, Bristol, England	25 June 2026
Last updated: 25 June 2026

=== Bowling ===
==== Most wickets ====
Wickets	Player	Matches	Innings	Avg.	Econ	BBI	Span
51	(South Africa) Shabnim Ismail†	38	38	15.86	6.01	3/5	2009–2026
48	(Australia) Megan Schutt†	30	30	11.93	5.64	4/18	2016–2026
44	(Australia) Ellyse Perry†	54	45	16.75	5.80	3/12	2009–2026
41	(England) Anya Shrubsole	27	27	12.48	5.32	3/6	2010–2020
39	(South Africa) Marizanne Kapp†	38	37	17.10	5.11	3/16	2009–2026
39	(England) Sophie Ecclestone†	25	25	12.10	4.82	3/16	2018–2026
Last updated: 8 July 2026

==== Best bowling figures ====
Figure	Player	Overs	Opposition	Venue	Date
5/5	(Cricket West Indies) Deandra Dottin	3.4	Bangladesh	Providence Stadium, Providence, Guyana	9 November 2018
5/8	(South Africa) Suné Luus	4.0	Ireland	M. A. Chidambaram Stadium, Chennai, India	23 March 2016
5/10	(India) Deepti Sharma	4.0	Pakistan	Edgbaston Cricket Ground, Birmingham, England	14 June 2026
5/12	(Australia) Ashleigh Gardner	3.0	New Zealand	Boland Park, Paarl, South Africa	11 February 2023
5/15	(India) Renuka Singh	4.0	England	St George's Park Cricket Ground, Gqeberha, South Africa	18 February 2023
Last updated: 14 June 2026

==== Best average ====
Avg.	Player	Matches	Wickets	Overs	Runs	Span
11.85	(England) Holly Colvin	11	20	43.4	237	2009–2012
11.93	(Australia) Megan Schutt†	30	48	101.3	573	2016–2026
12.10	(England) Sophie Ecclestone†	25	39	97.5	472	2018–2026
12.48	(England) Anya Shrubsole	27	41	96.1	512	2010–2020
12.59	(Cricket West Indies) Deandra Dottin†	41	32	61.4	403	2009–2026
Last updated: 9 July 2026; (Minimum 250 deliveries)

==== Best strike rate ====
SR	Player	Matches	Wickets	Overs	Span
11.56	(Cricket West Indies) Deandra Dottin†	41	32	61.4	2009–2026
12.68	(Australia) Megan Schutt†	30	48	101.3	2016–2026
13.10	(England) Holly Colvin	11	20	43.4	2009–2012
13.58	(New Zealand) Leigh Kasperek	14	24	54.2	2016–2024
14.07	(England) Anya Shrubsole	27	41	96.1	2010–2020
Last updated: 9 July 2026; (Minimum 250 deliveries)

==== Best economy rate ====
Eco.	Player	Matches	Wickets	Overs	Runs	Span
4.31	(New Zealand) Morna Nielsen	14	11	51.0	220	2012–2016
4.45	(England) Laura Marsh	15	19	59.0	263	2009–2016
4.82	(England) Sophie Ecclestone†	25	39	97.5	472	2018–2026
4.95	(New Zealand) Sian Ruck	13	14	43.0	213	2009–2012
5.03	(Sri Lanka) Udeshika Prabodhani	29	25	100.5	508	2009–2024
Last updated: 9 July 2026; (Minimum 250 deliveries)

==== Most four-wicket hauls (and over) ====
4+	Player	Innings	Wickets	Overs	BBI	4s	5s	Span
3	(Cricket West Indies) Deandra Dottin†	22	32	61.4	5/5	2	1	2009–2026
2	(India) Diana David	4	9	16.0	4/12	2	0	2010–2010
2	(Australia) Ashleigh Gardner†	26	29	78.0	5/12	1	1	2018–2026
2	(Australia) Megan Schutt†	30	48	101.3	4/18	2	0	2016–2026
Last updated: 9 July 2026

==== Most wickets in a tournament ====
Wickets	Player	Matches	Overs	Best Figure	Season
15	(New Zealand) Amelia Kerr	6	22.4	4/26	2024
14	(India) Shree Charani	5	20.0	4/19	2026
13	(England) Anya Shrubsole	6	24.0	3/6	2014
13	(Australia) Megan Schutt	6	21.1	4/18	2020
12	(South Africa) Nonkululeko Mlaba	6	24.0	4/29	2024
Last updated: 28 June 2026

== Partnership ==
=== Highest partnerships (by runs) ===
Runs	Partnership	Batters	Batting team	Opposition	Venue	Date
169*	3rd wicket	Nat Sciver-Brunt & Heather Knight	England	Thailand	Manuka Oval, Canberra, Australia	26 February 2020
163*	1st wicket	Dane van Niekerk & Lizelle Lee	South Africa	Pakistan	Sylhet International Cricket Stadium, Sylhet, Bangladesh	23 March 2014
151	1st wicket	Beth Mooney & Alyssa Healy	Australia	Bangladesh	Manuka Oval, Canberra, Australia	27 February 2020
135	1st wicket	Amy Jones & Nat Sciver-Brunt	England	Sri Lanka	Edgbaston Cricket Ground, Birmingham, England	12 June 2026
134	4th wicket	Harmanpreet Kaur & Jemimah Rodrigues	India	New Zealand	Providence Stadium, Providence, Guyana	9 November 2018
Last updated: 12 June 2026

=== Highest partnerships (by wicket) ===
Wicket	Runs	Batters	Team	Opposition	Venue	Date
1st wicket	163*	Dane van Niekerk & Lizelle Lee	South Africa	Pakistan	Sylhet International Cricket Stadium, Sylhet, Bangladesh	23 March 2014
2nd wicket	131	Sune Luus & Lizelle Lee	South Africa	Thailand	Manuka Oval, Canberra, Australia	28 February 2020
3rd wicket	169*	Nat Sciver-Brunt & Heather Knight	England	Thailand	Manuka Oval, Canberra, Australia	26 February 2020
4th wicket	134	Harmanpreet Kaur & Jemimah Rodrigues	India	New Zealand	Providence Stadium, Providence, Guyana	9 November 2018
5th wicket	118	Deandra Dottin & Shanel Daley	West Indies	South Africa	Warner Park Sporting Complex, Basseterre, Saint Kitts & Nevis	5 May 2010
6th wicket	68	Karen Rolton & Alex Blackwell	Australia	South Africa	County Ground, Taunton, England	16 June 2009
7th wicket	58	Anya Shrubsole & Sophia Dunkley	England	West Indies	Daren Sammy Cricket Ground, Gros Islet, Saint Lucia	18 November 2018
8th wicket	37	Tuba Hassan & Fatima Sana	Pakistan	England	Newlands Cricket Ground, Cape Town, South Africa	21 February 2023
9th wicket	71	Tuba Hassan & Fatima Sana	Pakistan	South Africa	Edgbaston Cricket Ground, Birmingham, England	17 June 2026
10th wicket	20	Batool Fatima & Almas Akram	Pakistan	India	County Ground, Taunton, England	13 June 2009
Last updated: 21 June 2026

== Other records ==
=== Most matches as umpire ===
Matches	Umpire
28	(Australia) Claire Polosak
26	(Cricket West Indies) Jacqueline Williams
25	(New Zealand) Kim Cotton
18	(South Africa) Marais Erasmus
18	(England) Sue Redfern
Last updated: 9 July

=== Most matches as player ===
Matches	Player
54	(Australia) Ellyse Perry
45	(New Zealand) Suzie Bates
44	(India) Harmanpreet Kaur
42	(Cricket West Indies) Shemaine Campbelle
42	(New Zealand) Sophie Devine
42	(Australia) Alyssa Healy
Last updated: 30 June 2026

== Other results ==
=== General statistics by tournament ===
Year	Host	Champion	Winning captain	Most runs	Most wickets	Player of the match (Final)	Player of the tournament
2009	England		(England) Charlotte Edwards	(New Zealand) Aimee Watkins (200)	(England) Holly Colvin (9)	(England) Katherine Sciver-Brunt	(England) Claire Taylor
2010	West Indies	Australia	(Australia) Alex Blackwell	(New Zealand) Sara McGlashan (147)	(India) Diana David (New Zealand) Nicola Browne (9)	(Australia) Ellyse Perry	(New Zealand) Nicola Browne
2012	Sri Lanka	Australia	(Australia) Jodie Fields	(England) Charlotte Edwards (172)	(Australia) Julie Hunter (11)	(England) Charlotte Edwards	(Australia) Jess Cameron
2014	Bangladesh	Australia	(Australia) Meg Lanning	(Australia) Meg Lanning (257)	(England) Anya Shrubsole (13)	(England) Anya Shrubsole	(Australia) Sarah Coyte
2016	India	West Indies	(Cricket West Indies) Stafanie Taylor	(Cricket West Indies) Stafanie Taylor (246)	(New Zealand) Leigh Kasperek (New Zealand) Sophie Devine (Cricket West Indies) Deandra Dottin (9)	(Cricket West Indies) Hayley Matthews	(Cricket West Indies) Stafanie Taylor
2018	West Indies	Australia	(Australia) Meg Lanning	(Australia) Alyssa Healy (225)	(Cricket West Indies) Deandra Dottin (Australia) Ashleigh Gardner (Australia) Megan Schutt (10)	(Australia) Ashleigh Gardner	(Australia) Alyssa Healy
2021	Australia	Australia	(Australia) Meg Lanning	(Australia) Beth Mooney (259)	(Australia) Megan Schutt (13)	(Australia) Alyssa Healy	(Australia) Beth Mooney
2023	South Africa	Australia	(Australia) Meg Lanning	(South Africa) Laura Wolvaardt (230)	(England) Sophie Ecclestone (11)	(Australia) Beth Mooney	(Australia) Ashleigh Gardner
2024	United Arab Emirates	New Zealand	(New Zealand) Sophie Devine	(South Africa) Laura Wolvaardt (223)	(New Zealand) Amelia Kerr (15)	(New Zealand) Amelia Kerr	
2026	England	Australia	(Australia) Sophie Molineux	(England) Danni Wyatt-Hodge (302)	(India) Shree Charani (14)	(Australia) Beth Mooney	

=== Results of host teams ===
Year	Host Team	Finish
2009	England	Champions
2010	West Indies	Semi-finalists
2012	Sri Lanka	Round 1
2014	Bangladesh	Round 1
2016	India	Round 1
2018	West Indies	Semi-finalists
2020	Australia	Champions
2023	South Africa	Runners-up
2024	United Arab Emirates	Did not qualify
2026	England	Runners-up
2028	Pakistan	

=== Results of defending champions ===
Year	Defending champions	Finish
2009	Inaugural Edition	
2010	England	Round 1
2012	Australia	Champions
2014	Australia	Champions
2016	Australia	Runners-up
2018	West Indies	Semi-finalists
2020	Australia	Champions
2023	Australia	Champions
2024	Australia	Semi-finalists
2026	New Zealand	Round 1
2028	Australia	

== See also ==
- List of Women's Cricket World Cup records
- List of women's Twenty20 International records
