= 2026 T20 World Cup =

2026 T20 World Cup can refer to the following Twenty20 International cricket tournaments:

- 2026 Men's T20 World Cup
- 2026 Women's T20 World Cup
