= 2026 Women's T20 World Cup final =

International cricket match

2026 ICC Women's T20 World Cup final
- Match programme cover
- Event: 2026 ICC Women's T20 World Cup
England	Australia
150/4	153/3
20 overs	17.1 overs
- Australia won by 7 wickets
- Date: 5 July 2026 15:30 UTC+1
- Venue: Lord's, London
- Player of the match: Beth Mooney (Aus)
- Umpires: Vrinda Rathi (Ind) and Jacqueline Williams (WI)
- Attendance: 28,000

The 2026 ICC Women's T20 World Cup final was a Women's Twenty20 International (WT20I) cricket match played at Lord's in London, England, on 5 July 2026 to determine the winner of the 2026 ICC Women's T20 World Cup. It was played between Australia and England.

Australia won the toss and elected to field first; England managed to score 150/4 in their innings. In the second innings, Australia chased down the target in 17.1 overs to win their record seventh title. The match was attended by 28,000 spectators and viewed by 678,000 viewers across the Sky network.

== Background ==
The 2026 ICC Women's T20 World Cup was the tenth edition of the ICC Women's T20 World Cup, a biennial world cup for women's cricket in Women's Twenty20 International (WT20I) format, organized by the International Cricket Council (ICC). In July 2022 as part of the 2024–2027 ICC women's hosts cycle, the ICC announced that the 2026 ICC Women's T20 World Cup would be played in England.

In May 2025, the England and Wales Cricket Board (ECB) confirmed the venues for the tournament, with Lord's in London, England named as the venue for the final scheduled for 5 July 2026. Lord's would be the first venue to host two Women's T20 World Cup finals having hosted the final of the inaugural edition in 2009.

This was Australia's eighth T20 World Cup final after being winners in 2010, 2012, 2014, 2018, 2020 and 2023 and runners-up in 2016 while it was England's fifth final after being winners in 2009 and runners-up in 2012, 2014 and 2018. Australia and England had previously played each other in three T20 World Cup finals, with Australia winning on all three occasions.

=== Closing ceremony ===
On 2 July, the ICC announced that Rita Ora would perform during the pre-match closing ceremony, while Clean Bandit would perform after the match. In the pre-match ceremony Rita Ora performed "Praising You", "I Will Never Let You Down", "Ritual", "For You", "Believe" (cover), "Your Song", "Let You Love Me" and "Anywhere". In the post-match performance Clean Bandit performed "Solo", "Rockabye", "Real Love" "Symphony" and "Rather Be"

== Road to the final ==
=== Overview ===
- Source: Cricinfo

Australia				vs	England
Opponent	Date	Result	Points	Match	Opponent	Date	Result	Points
Group A				Group stage	Group B
South Africa	13 June 2026	Won	2	1	Sri Lanka	12 June 2026	Won	2
Bangladesh	17 June 2026	Won	4	2	Ireland	16 June 2026	Won	4
Netherlands	20 June 2026	Won	6	3	Scotland	20 June 2026	Won	6
Pakistan	23 June 2026	Won	8	4	West Indies	24 June 2026	Won	8
India	28 June 2026	Won	10	5	New Zealand	27 June 2026	Won	10
Semi-final 1				Knockout stage	Semi-final 2
West Indies	30 June 2026	Won		SF	South Africa	2 July 2026	Won
2026 ICC Women's T20 World Cup final

=== Australia ===
Australia began their T20 World Cup campaign with a victory over South Africa at Old Trafford Cricket Ground in Manchester and went on to defeat Bangladesh at Headingley Cricket Ground in Leeds, Netherlands at Rose Bowl in Southampton, Pakistan in Leeds and India at Lord's to finish the group stage as winners of Group A. Australia then defeated West Indies in the semi-final 1 at The Oval in London to qualify for their record eighth T20 World Cup final.

=== England ===
England began their T20 World Cup campaign with a victory over Sri Lanka at Edgbaston Cricket Ground in Birmingham and went on to defeat Ireland in Southampton, Scotland in Leeds, West Indies at Lord's and the defending champions New Zealand at The Oval to finish the group stage as winners of Group B. England then defeated South Africa in the semi-final 2 at The Oval to qualify for their fifth T20 World Cup final.

== Match ==
=== Match officials ===
On 3 July 2026, the ICC named India's Vrinda Rathi and West Indies' Jacqueline Williams as the on-field umpires, along with New Zealand's Kim Cotton as the third umpire, Sri Lanka's Nimali Perera as the reserve umpire, and India's G. S. Lakshmi as match referee.

=== Team and toss ===
Australia's captain Sophie Molineux won the toss and elected to field first. Both teams remained unchanged from their respective semi-finals.

- England: Amy Jones (wk), Danni Wyatt-Hodge, Nat Sciver-Brunt (c), Alice Capsey, Heather Knight, Freya Kemp, Dani Gibson, Charlie Dean, Sophie Ecclestone, Linsey Smith, Lauren Bell
- Australia: Georgia Voll, Beth Mooney (wk), Phoebe Litchfield, Ellyse Perry, Ashleigh Gardner, Georgia Wareham, Annabel Sutherland, Nicola Carey, Sophie Molineux (c), Kim Garth, Lucy Hamilton

=== Match scorecard ===
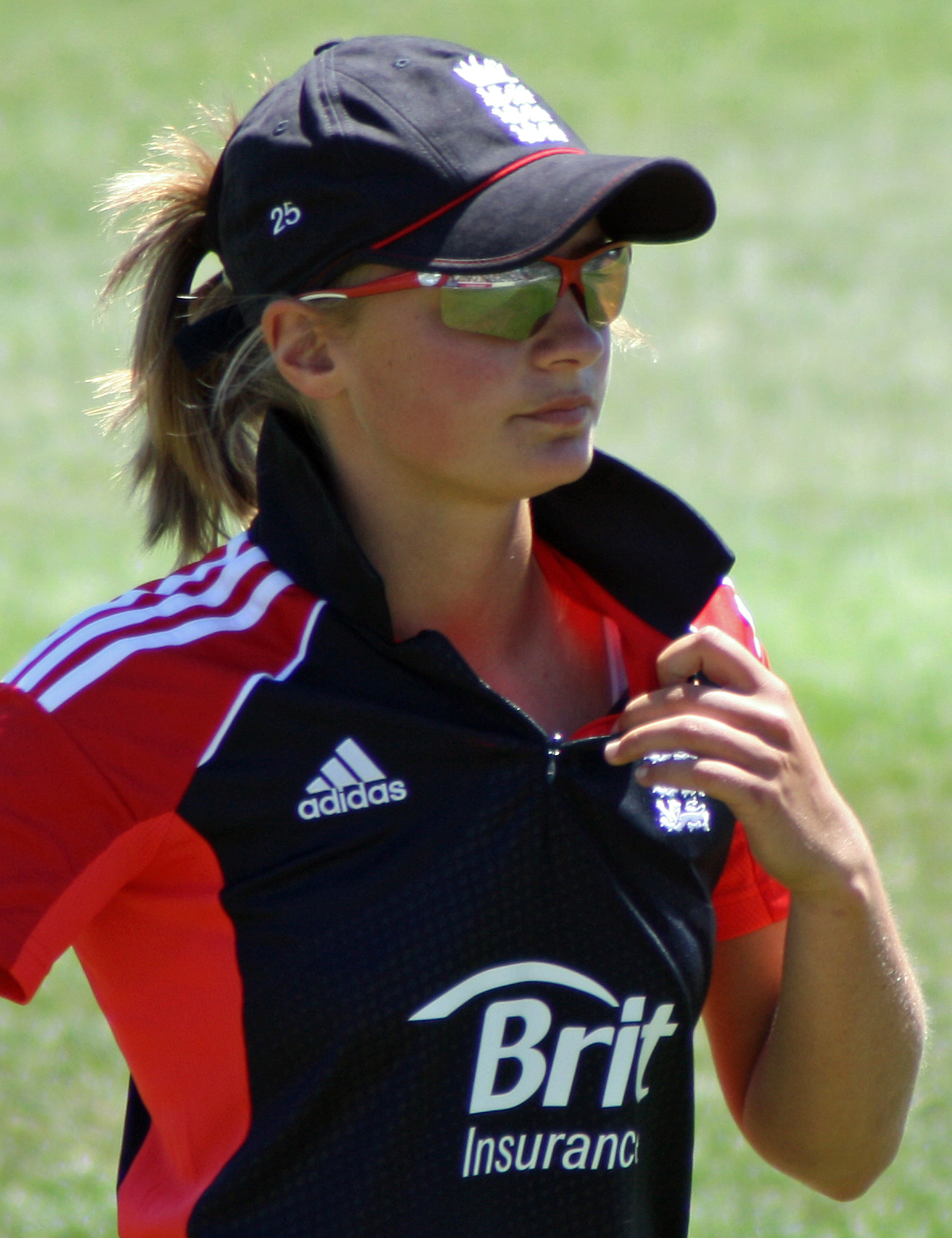
Danni Wyatt-Hodge became the first player to score over 300 runs in a single edition of the T20 World Cup.

5 July 2026
15:30 UTC+1
Scorecard

England; 150/4 (20 overs)	v	Australia; 153/3 (17.1 overs)
Nat Sciver-Brunt 58* (53); Lucy Hamilton 1/19 (3 overs)		Beth Mooney 64 (49); Sophie Ecclestone 1/24 (3.1 overs)

Australia won by 7 wickets
Lord's, London
Attendance: 28,000
Umpires: Vrinda Rathi (Ind) and Jacqueline Williams (WI)
Player of the match: Beth Mooney (Aus)

- Australia won the toss and elected to field.
- This was Australia's eighth T20 World Cup final; most for any nation.
- Danni Wyatt-Hodge (Eng) became the first player to score over 300 runs in a single edition of the T20 World Cup.
- Nat Sciver-Brunt (Eng) and Beth Mooney (Aus) surpassed Suzie Bates to equal each other for most half-centuries in T20 World Cups (9 each).
- Heather Knight (Eng) played in her last T20I.
- This was the highest successful run chase in a T20 World Cup final.
- This was Australia's seventh T20 World Cup title and the 14th overall title in ICC limited-overs competitions.

=== England innings ===
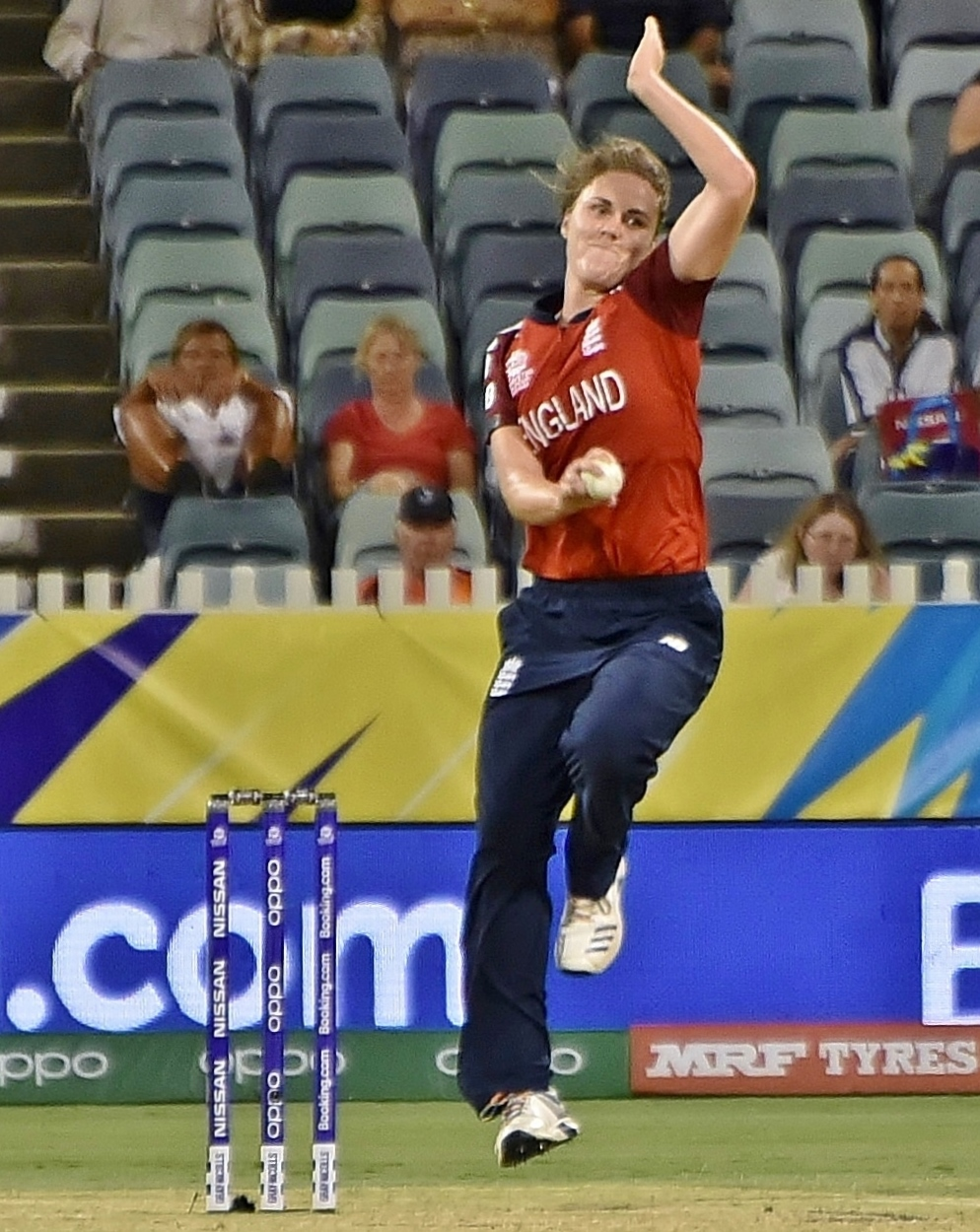
Nat Sciver-Brunt was the highest run-scorer for England in the match.

Put to bat first, England lost both their openers for single-digit scores. Then, English captain Sciver-Brunt and Capsey steadied the innings until the later was bowled out by the Australian captain Molineux in the tenth over followed by Knight's dismissal in the next over bowled by Garth. Then, Sciver-Brunt and Kemp put together an 80-run undefeated partnership in the last 9 overs to take the team total to 150 runs for the loss of 4 wickets. Sciver-Brunt was the highest run-scorer for England with 58 runs from 53 balls while Garth, Hamilton, Molineux and Sutherland picked up a wicket each for Australia.

England batting
Player	Status	Runs	Balls	4s	6s	Strike rate
Amy Jones	c Voll b Hamilton	6	6	1	0	100.00
Danni Wyatt-Hodge	c †Mooney b Sutherland	8	9	1	0	88.88
Nat Sciver-Brunt	not out	58	53	5	0	109.43
Alice Capsey	b Molineux	23	20	2	1	115.00
Heather Knight	lbw b Garth	2	6	0	0	33.33
Freya Kemp	not out	44	28	4	1	157.14
Dani Gibson	did not bat					
Charlie Dean	did not bat					
Sophie Ecclestone	did not bat					
Linsey Smith	did not bat					
Lauren Bell	did not bat					
Extras	(lb 4, nb 2, w 3)	9				
Total	(4 wickets; 20 overs)	150				RR: 7.50

Fall of wickets: 1/7 (Jones, 1.2 ov), 2/32 (Wyatt-Hodge, 4.5 ov), 3/67 (Capsey, 9.4 ov), 4/70 (Knight, 10.5 ov)

Australia bowling
Bowler	Overs	Maidens	Runs	Wickets	Econ	Wides	NBs
Kim Garth	4	0	20	1	5.00	1	0
Lucy Hamilton	3	0	19	1	6.33	0	1
Sophie Molineux	4	0	32	1	8.00	0	0
Annabel Sutherland	4	0	34	1	8.50	1	1
Georgia Wareham	2	0	9	0	4.50	1	0
Ashleigh Gardner	3	0	32	0	10.66	0	0

=== Australia innings ===
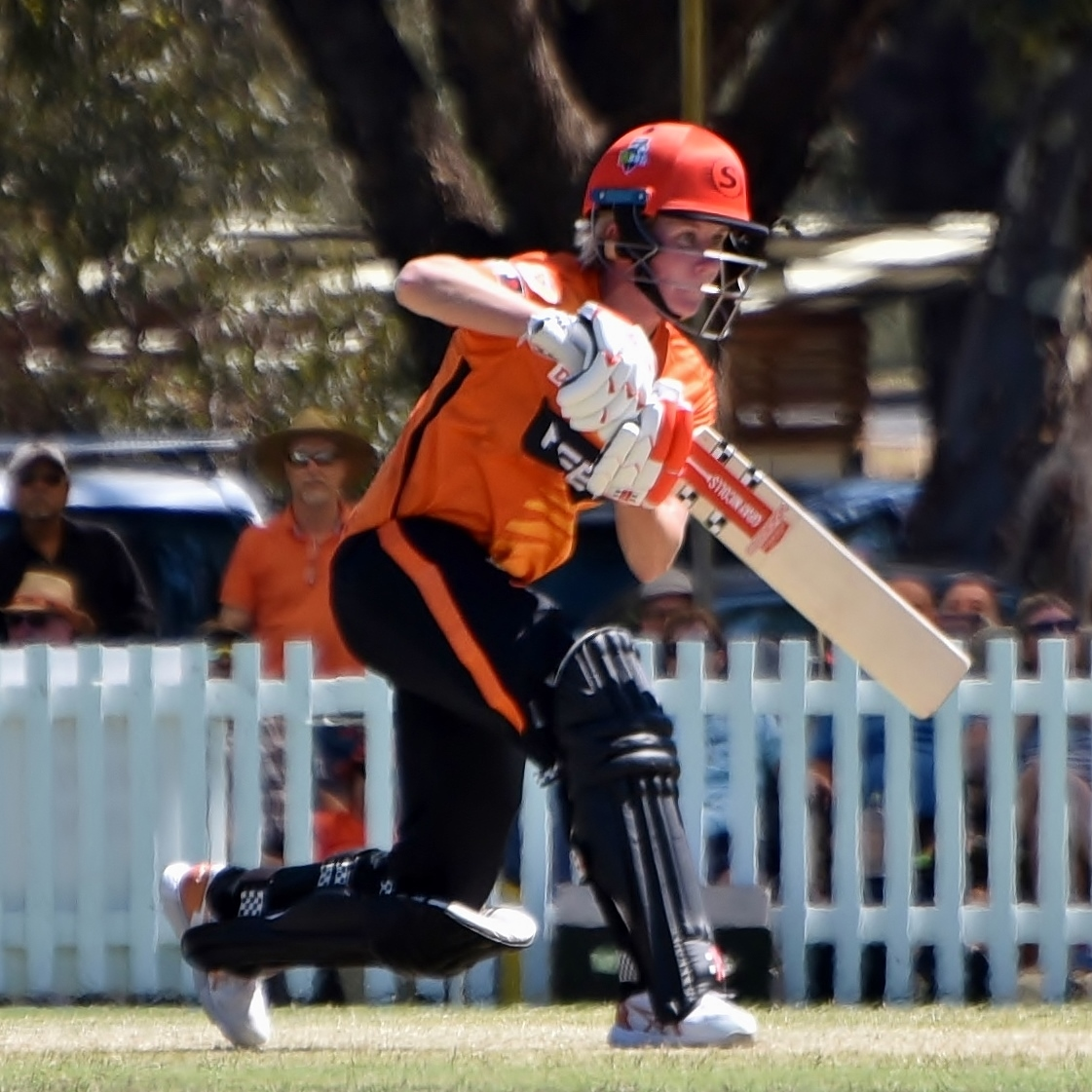
Beth Mooney received the player of the match award for the final as well as the player of the tournament award.

Chasing the target of 151, Australia lost their opener Voll for a single-digit score in the second over. Then, Mooney and Litchfield steadied the innings with a 100-run partnership from 11 overs; until both were dismissed in the 13th and 16th overs respectively leaving the team at 140 runs. Then, Perry and Gardner scored 13 runs in 7 balls to take the team to 153 runs for the loss of 3 wickets in 17.1 overs to secure the team's record seventh title. Dean, Bell and Ecclestone picked up a wicket each for England while Mooney was the highest run-scorer for Australia with 64 runs from 49 balls and received the player of the match award for the final as well as the player of the tournament award.

Australia batting
Player	Status	Runs	Balls	4s	6s	Strike rate
Georgia Voll	b Bell	9	6	2	0	150.00
Beth Mooney	lbw b Ecclestone	64	49	10	0	130.61
Phoebe Litchfield	b Dean	48	35	6	2	137.14
Ellyse Perry	not out	13	12	2	0	108.33
Ashleigh Gardner	not out	3	2	0	0	150.00
Georgia Wareham	did not bat					
Annabel Sutherland	did not bat					
Nicola Carey	did not bat					
Sophie Molineux	did not bat					
Kim Garth	did not bat					
Lucy Hamilton	did not bat					
Extras	(b 4, nb 1, w 11)	16				
Total	(3 wickets; 17.1 overs)	153				RR: 8.91

Fall of wickets: 1/17 (Voll, 1.5 ov), 2/117 (Litchfield, 12.6 ov), 3/140 (Mooney, 15.6 ov)

England bowling
Bowler	Overs	Maidens	Runs	Wickets	Econ	Wides	NBs
Charlie Dean	4	0	28	1	7.00	2	0
Lauren Bell	3	0	38	1	12.66	2	1
Linsey Smith	4	0	30	0	7.50	0	0
Freya Kemp	2	0	22	0	11.00	0	0
Sophie Ecclestone	3.1	0	24	1	7.57	2	0
Dani Gibson	1	0	7	0	7.00	0	0

== Aftermath ==
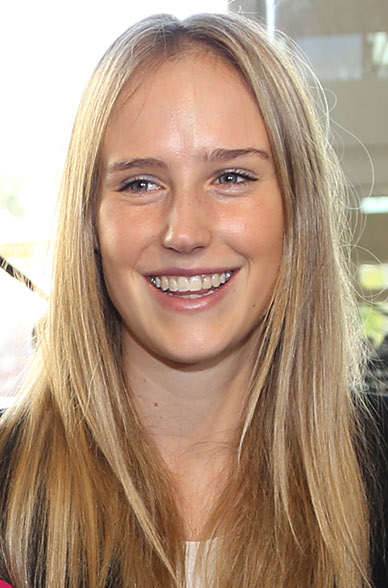
Ellyse Perry became the first cricketer in both genders to win nine world cups across both formats.

This was Australia's seventh T20 World Cup title victory, after 2010, 2012, 2014, 2018, 2020 and 2023; and the fourteenth overall world cup victory having won the Women's Cricket World Cup seven times as well in 1978, 1982, 1988, 1997, 2005, 2013, and 2022. Beth Mooney became the first player to be named as player of the match in the final and the player of the tournament twice in the history of T20 World Cup. Ellyse Perry became the first cricketer in both genders to win nine world cups across both formats.

Australia received US$2.34 million and England received US$1.17 million in prize money from the ICC for the final. Additionally, both teams received US$247,500 each as participation fee and US$31,154 for each group stage match won (5 each).

On 20 July 2026, the ICC announced England's Danni Wyatt-Hodge as the women's player of the month for June for her performance in the tournament.

== Broadcasting ==
The final match was broadcast live in Australia through Amazon's Prime video platform and the ABC Radio network. In England the match was broadcast live on Sky Sports network as well as the streaming service Sky Go along with the BBC Radio network. The match was also broadcast worldwide through ICC.tv and the ICC's official YouTube channel with radio coverage on the ICC's official app. The final match had a peak of 678,000 concurrent viewers in the Sky network.

== See also ==
- International cricket in 2026
- Associate international cricket in 2026
- 2026 Men's T20 World Cup
- 2026 Men's T20 World Cup final
- 2026 Men's T20 World Cup qualification
- 2026 Men's T20 World Cup squads
- International cricket in 2025–26
- Associate international cricket in 2025–26
