= 2017–18 India women's Tri-Nation Series =

Cricket tournament

- Date: 19–31 March 2018
- Location: India
- Result: Australia won the series
- Player of the series: (Australia) Megan Schutt
Teams
Australia	England	India
Captains
Meg Lanning (Note: Rachael Haynes captained Australia in the second WT20I match.)	Heather Knight (Note: Danielle Hazell captained England in the final.)	Harmanpreet Kaur
Most runs
Meg Lanning (175)	Danni Wyatt (213)	Smriti Mandhana (208)
Most wickets
Megan Schutt (9)	Jenny Gunn (5)	Jhulan Goswami (5)

The 2017–18 India women's Tri-Nation Series was a cricket tournament that took place in India in March 2018. It was a tri-nation series among Australia women, England women and the India women cricket teams. The matches were played as Women's Twenty20 International (WT20I) fixtures, with the top two teams progressing to the final on 31 March 2018. Ahead of the WT20I fixtures, India A played two warm-up fixtures against England.

In the third match of the series, England's Jenny Gunn became the first player, male or female, to play in 100 Twenty20 International matches. In the fifth match, Australia's Meg Lanning became the first player for Australia, male or female, to score 2,000 runs in Twenty20 Internationals.

Australia Women and England Women qualified for the final, after India Women lost their first three matches of the series. In the final, Australia Women beat England Women by 57 runs to win the series. In the match, Australia Women scored 209 runs, the highest team total in a WT20I fixture. Australia Women also set a new record for the most fours scored in a Twenty20 International by any side, male or female, with 32 boundaries.

With nine wickets at an average of 12.33, the series leading wicket taker, Australian Megan Schutt, was named player of the series.

== Squads ==
Australia	England	India
Meg Lanning (c); Rachael Haynes (vc); Nicola Carey; Ashleigh Gardner; Alyssa Healy (wk); Jess Jonassen; Delissa Kimmince; Sophie Molineux; Beth Mooney; Ellyse Perry; Megan Schutt; Naomi Stalenberg; Elyse Villani; Amanda-Jade Wellington	Heather Knight (c); Tammy Beaumont; Kate Cross; Alice Davidson-Richards; Sophie Ecclestone; Tash Farrant; Katie George; Jenny Gunn; Alex Hartley; Danielle Hazell; Amy Jones (wk); Anya Shrubsole; Bryony Smith; Nat Sciver; Fran Wilson; Danni Wyatt	Harmanpreet Kaur (c); Smriti Mandhana (vc); Taniya Bhatia (wk); Ekta Bisht; Rumeli Dhar; Jhulan Goswami; Veda Krishnamurthy; Mona Meshram; Shikha Pandey; Anuja Patil; Mithali Raj; Jemimah Rodrigues; Deepti Sharma; Pooja Vastrakar; Poonam Yadav

== Tour matches ==
=== 1st 20-over match: India A Women v England Women ===
19 March 2018
Scorecard

England; 176/4 (20 overs)	v	India A 131 (20 overs)
Tammy Beaumont 57* (41); Radha Yadav 2/37 (4 overs)		Dayalan Hemalatha 41 (32); Natasha Farrant 2/21 (3 overs)

England Women won by 45 runs
Brabourne Stadium, Mumbai
Umpires: Bhanushali Ashish (Ind) and Vinod Seshan (Ind)

- England Women won the toss and elected to bat.
- 14 players per side (11 batting, 11 fielding).

=== 2nd 20-over match: India A Women v England Women ===
20 March 2018
Scorecard

India A 85/9 (20 overs)	v	England; 210/4 (20 overs)
Vellaswamy Vanitha 40 (51); Katie George 4/6 (3 overs)		Nat Sciver 54 (35); Shannti Kumari 2/34 (4 overs)

England Women won by 9 wickets
Brabourne Stadium, Mumbai
Umpires: Sandeep Chavan (Ind) and Milind Pathak (Ind)

- India A Women won the toss and elected to bat.
- 14 players per side (11 batting, 11 fielding).

== Points table ==
Pos	Team	Pld	W	L	T	NR	Pts	NRR
1	Australia	4	3	1	0	0	6	1.323
2	England	4	2	2	0	0	4	−0.923
3	India	4	1	3	0	0	2	−0.399

Source: ESPNcricinfo

== WT20I series ==
=== 1st WT20I ===
22 March 2018
Scorecard

India; 152/5 (20 overs)	v	Australia; 156/4 (18.1 overs)
Smriti Mandhana 67 (41); Ashleigh Gardner 2/22 (4 overs)		Beth Mooney 45 (32); Jhulan Goswami 3/30 (4 overs)

Australia Women won by 6 wickets
Brabourne Stadium, Mumbai
Umpires: K. N. Ananthapadmanabhan (Ind) and Saiyed Khalid (Ind)
Player of the match: Ashleigh Gardner (Aus)

- Australia Women won the toss and elected to field.
- Sophie Molineux (Aus) made her WT20I debut.
- Points: Australia Women 2, India Women 0.

=== 2nd WT20I ===
23 March 2018
Scorecard

Australia; 149/8 (20 overs)	v	England; 150/2 (17 overs)
Rachael Haynes 65 (45); Jenny Gunn 3/26 (4 overs)		Nat Sciver 68* (43); Delissa Kimmince 1/12 (1 over)

England Women won by 8 wickets
Brabourne Stadium, Mumbai
Umpires: Ulhas Gandhe (Ind) and Rohan Pandit (Ind)
Player of the match: Nat Sciver (Eng)

- England Women won the toss and elected to field.
- Nicola Carey (Aus), Bryony Smith, Alice Davidson-Richards and Katie George (Eng) all made their WT20I debuts.
- Points: England Women 2, Australia Women 0.

=== 3rd WT20I ===
25 March 2018
Scorecard

India; 198/4 (20 overs)	v	England; 199/3 (18.4 overs)
Smriti Mandhana 76 (40); Tash Farrant 2/32 (4 over)		Danni Wyatt 124 (64); Deepti Sharma 2/36 (4 overs)

England Women won by 7 wickets
Brabourne Stadium, Mumbai
Umpires: Ulhas Gandhe (Ind) and Saiyed Khalid (Ind)
Player of the match: Danni Wyatt (Eng)

- England Women won the toss and elected to field.
- Jenny Gunn (Eng) became the first cricketer, male or female, to play in 100 T20I matches.
- Smriti Mandhana (Ind) scored the fastest half-century by an Indian women in WT20Is (25 balls).
- This was India Women's highest score in WT20Is and was the third highest team total in WT20Is.
- Danni Wyatt (Eng) scored her second century and made the second-highest individual score in WT20Is. She also became the second player to score two WT20I centuries and also registered the highest individual score as an opener in a WT20I.
- This was the highest successful run-chase in WT20Is and the second highest team total made by a team in a WT20I match. This was also the highest team total made by England in a WT20I.
- Points: England Women 2, India Women 0.

=== 4th WT20I ===
26 March 2018
Scorecard

Australia; 186/5 (20 overs)	v	India; 150/5 (20 overs)
Beth Mooney 71 (46); Pooja Vastrakar 2/28 (3 overs)		Jemimah Rodrigues 50 (41); Megan Schutt 3/31 (4 overs)

Australia Women won by 36 runs
Brabourne Stadium, Mumbai
Umpires: K. N. Ananthapadmanabhan (Ind) and Rohan Pandit (Ind)
Player of the match: Megan Schutt (Aus)

- India Women won the toss and elected to field.
- Megan Schutt became the first bowler for Australia Women to take a hat-trick in WT20Is.
- Australia Women and England Women qualified for the final as a result of this match.
- Points: Australia Women 2, India Women 0.

=== 5th WT20I ===
28 March 2018
Scorecard

England; 96 (17.4 overs)	v	Australia; 97/2 (11.3 overs)
Alice Davidson-Richards 24 (24); Delissa Kimmince 3/20 (4 overs)		Ellyse Perry 47* (32); Nat Sciver 1/9 (1 over)

Australia Women won by 8 wickets
Brabourne Stadium, Mumbai
Umpires: K. N. Ananthapadmanabhan (Ind) and Ulhas Gandhe (Ind)
Player of the match: Ellyse Perry (Aus)

- Australia Women won the toss and elected to field.
- Meg Lanning became the first player for Australia, male or female, to score 2,000 runs in Twenty20 Internationals.
- This was England Women's biggest defeat, in terms of balls remaining, in WT20Is (51).
- Points: Australia Women 2, England Women 0.

=== 6th WT20I ===
29 March 2018
Scorecard

England; 107 (18.5 overs)	v	India; 108/2 (15.4 overs)
Danni Wyatt 31 (22); Anuja Patil 3/21 (3.5 overs)		Smriti Mandhana 62* (41); Danielle Hazell 2/17 (3 overs)

India Women won by 8 wickets
Brabourne Stadium, Mumbai
Umpires: Saiyed Khalid (Ind) and Rohan Pandit (Ind)
Player of the match: Anuja Patil (Ind)

- England Women won the toss and elected to bat.
- Points: India Women 2, England Women 0.

== Final ==
31 March 2018
Scorecard

Australia; 209/4 (20 overs)	v	England; 152/9 (20 overs)
Meg Lanning 88* (45); Jenny Gunn 2/38 (4 overs)		Nat Sciver 50 (42); Megan Schutt 3/14 (4 overs)

Australia Women won by 57 runs
Brabourne Stadium, Mumbai
Umpires: K. N. Ananthapadmanabhan (Ind) and Rohan Pandit (Ind)
Player of the match: Meg Lanning (Aus)

- England Women won the toss and elected to field.
- Australia Women's total of 209 was the highest team total in WT20Is.
- Australia Women scored the most fours in a Twenty20 International by any side, male or female, with 32.
