= Women's T20 World Cup =

Women's Twenty20 International (T20I) Cricket World Cup

- Administrator: International Cricket Council
- Format: T20I
- First edition: 2009 England
- Latest edition: 2026 England & Wales
- Next edition: 2028 Pakistan
- Tournament format: Round robin and knockout
- Number of teams: 12 (16 from 2030)
- Current champion: Australia (7th title)
- Most successful: Australia (7 titles)
- Most runs: (New Zealand) Suzie Bates (1,254)
- Most wickets: (South Africa) Shabnim Ismail (51)
- Website: t20worldcup.com

The ICC Women's T20 World Cup is a biennial world cup for the sport of cricket in the T20I format. It is organised by the International Cricket Council. The first edition was held in England in 2009. For the first three editions, there were eight participating nations, The number was raised to ten from the 2014 edition, and further to 12 for the 2026 edition.

At each tournament, a set number of teams qualify automatically, with the remaining teams determined by the Global Qualifier. For 2028 the 12-team tournament will feature automatic qualification for 10 teams, including the top eight teams from the ICC Women's T20 World Cup 2026, the host nation if not already qualified, and the next highest-ranked team(s) on the ICC Women's T20I rankings as of 6 July 2026.

As of 2026, a total of ten editions have been held and thirteen teams have participated. Australia, having won the tournament seven times (2010, 2012, 2014, 2018, 2020, 2023, 2026) are the most successful team, while England (2009), West Indies (2016) and New Zealand (2024) have one title each.

Australia are the current champions having won the 2026 edition for a record seventh time, after defeating England in the final.

== Qualification ==
Qualification is determined by the ICC Women's Twenty20 International rankings and a qualification event, the Women's World Twenty20 Qualifier. Until 2014, the top six teams of the ICC Women's Twenty20 International rankings would automatically qualify and the remaining two places determined by a qualification process. In the 2014 edition, six places were determined by the top eight teams of the ICC Women's T20I rankings, with the host country and three qualifiers joining them in the tournament. From 2016 onwards, seven places were determined by the top eight teams of the ICC Women's T20I Team rankings, with the host country and two qualifiers joining them in the tournament.

== Trophy ==
The winners of the ICC Women's T20 World Cup receive a trophy designed and made by British silversmiths Thomas Lyte. Standing at 50 cm in height, the women's trophy was created with silver-plated base metal and brings together a number of separate metal castings.

== Summary ==
=== Tournaments ===
Details of Women's T20 World Cup tournaments
#	Year	Dates	Host(s)	Venues	Teams	Matches	Attendance	Ref.
1	2009	11 June – 21 June 2009	England and Wales Cricket Board	4 in England	8	15	—N/a	
2	2010	5 – 16 May 2010	Cricket West Indies	3 in the West Indies	8	15	—N/a	
3	2012	26 September – 7 October 2012	Sri Lanka Cricket	4 in Sri Lanka	8	17	—N/a	
4	2014	23 March – 6 April 2014	Bangladesh Cricket Board	2 in Bangladesh	10	27	—N/a	
5	2016	15 March – 3 April 2016	Board of Control for Cricket in India	8 in India	10	23	—N/a	
6	2018	9 – 24 November 2018	Cricket West Indies	3 in the West Indies	10	23	—N/a	
7	2020	21 February – 8 March 2020	Cricket Australia	6 in Australia	10	23	—N/a	
8	2023	10 – 26 February 2023	Cricket South Africa	3 in South Africa	10	23	—N/a	
9	2024	3 – 20 October 2024	Bangladesh Cricket Board	2 in the United Arab Emirates	10	23	—N/a	
10	2026	12 June – 5 July 2026	England and Wales Cricket Board	7 in England	12	33	—N/a	
11	2028	TBA	Pakistan Cricket Board	TBA	12	33		

=== Final results ===
Details of Women's T20 World Cup finals
Year	Final				Ref.
Year	Date & Venue	Winner	Victory margin	Runner-up	Ref.
2009	21 June 2009; Lord's, London	England; 86/4 (17 overs)	6 wickets	New Zealand; 85 (20 overs)	
2010	16 May 2010; Kensington Oval, Bridgetown	Australia; 106/8 (20 overs)	3 runs	New Zealand; 103/6 (20 overs)	
2012	7 October 2012; R. Premadasa Stadium, Colombo	Australia; 142/4 (20 overs)	4 runs	England; 138/9 (20 overs)	
2014	6 April 2014; Sher-e-Bangla National Cricket Stadium, Dhaka	Australia; 106/4 (15.1 overs)	6 wickets	England; 105/8 (20 overs)	
2016	3 April 2016; Eden Gardens, Kolkata	West Indies; 149/2 (19.3 overs)	8 wickets	Australia; 148/5 (20 overs)	
2018	24 November 2018; Sir Vivian Richards Stadium, North Sound	Australia; 106/2 (15.1 overs)	8 wickets	England; 105 (19.4 overs)	
2020	8 March 2020; Melbourne Cricket Ground, Melbourne	Australia; 184/4 (20 overs)	85 runs	India; 99 (19.1 overs)	
2023	26 February 2023; Newlands Cricket Ground, Cape Town	Australia; 156/6 (20 overs)	19 runs	South Africa; 137/6 (20 overs)	
2024	20 October 2024; Dubai International Cricket Stadium, Dubai	New Zealand; 158/5 (20 overs)	32 runs	South Africa; 126/9 (20 overs)	
2026	5 July 2026; Lord's, London	Australia; 153/3 (17.1 overs)	7 wickets	England; 150/4 (20 overs)	

== Performance by nations ==
As of the 2026 edition

Nations are ordered by best result then by appearances, then by winning percentage, then by total number of wins, total number of games, and then alphabetically:

Team	Appearances			Best result	Statistics					
Team	Total	First	Latest	Best result	Played	Won	Lost	Tie	NR	Win%
Australia	10	2009	2026	Champions (2010, 2012, 2014, 2018, 2020, 2023, 2026)	56	46	9	1(1)	0	83.92
England	10	2009	2026	Champions (2009)	49	37	11	1(0)	0	75.51
New Zealand	10	2009	2026	Champions (2024)	47	31	16	0	0	65.95
West Indies	10	2009	2026	Champions (2016)	45	26	19	0	0	57.77
South Africa	10	2009	2026	Runners-up (2023, 2024)	45	22	23	0	0	48.88
India	10	2009	2026	Runners-up (2020)	45	25	20	0	0	55.55
Sri Lanka	10	2009	2026	First Round (2009–2024)	40	13	27	0	0	32.50
Pakistan	10	2009	2026	First Round (2009–2024)	41	10	30	0	1	25.00
Bangladesh	7	2014	2026	First Round (2014–2024)	30	5	25	0	0	16.66
Ireland	5	2014	2026	First Round (2014–2018, 2023, 2026)	22	1	21	0	0	4.54
Scotland	2	2024	2026	First Round (2024–2026)	9	1	8	0	0	11.11
Thailand	1	2020	2020	First Round (2020)	4	0	3	0	1	0.00
Netherlands	1	2026	2026	First Round (2026)	5	0	5	0	0	0.00

Note:

- The number in bracket indicates number of wins in tied matches by Super Overs however these are considered half a win regardless of the result. The win percentage excludes no results and counts ties (irrespective of a tiebreaker) as half a win.

=== By editions ===
The table below provides an overview of the performances of teams in the ICC Women's T20 World Cup. For each tournament, the number of teams in each finals tournament (in brackets) are shown.

Legend

- C – Champions
- RU – Runners-up
- SF – Semi-finalist
- R1 – Round 1 (group stage)
- Q – Qualified, Still in Competition
- • – Did not qualify
- × – Did not enter
- — Hosts

No. of Teams/ Hosts/ Year Teams	(8) (England) 2009	(8) (Cricket West Indies) 2010	(8) (Sri Lanka) 2012	(10) (Bangladesh) 2014	(10) (India) 2016	(10) (Cricket West Indies) 2018	(10) (Australia) 2020	(10) (South Africa) 2023	(10) (United Arab Emirates) 2024	(12) (England) 2026	(12) (Pakistan) 2028	Total
Australia	SF	C	C	C	RU	C	C	C	SF	C	Q	11
Bangladesh	×	×	×	R1	R1	R1	R1	R1	R1	R1	Q	8
England	C	R1	RU	RU	SF	RU	SF	SF	R1	RU	Q	11
India	SF	SF	R1	R1	R1	SF	RU	SF	R1	R1	Q	11
Ireland	×	×	×	R1	R1	R1	•	R1	•	R1	Q	6
New Zealand	RU	RU	SF	R1	SF	R1	R1	R1	C	R1	Q	11
Netherlands	×	×	×	•	•	•	•	•	•	R1		1
Pakistan	R1	R1	R1	R1	R1	R1	R1	R1	R1	R1	Q	11
Scotland	×	×	×	×	•	•	•	•	R1	R1		2
South Africa	R1	R1	R1	SF	R1	R1	SF	RU	RU	SF	Q	11
Sri Lanka	R1	R1	R1	R1	R1	R1	R1	R1	R1	R1	Q	11
Thailand	×	×	×	•	•	•	R1	•	•	•		1
West Indies	R1	SF	SF	SF	C	SF	R1	R1	SF	SF	Q	11

=== Team debuts ===
Year	Debutants	Total
2009	Australia, England, India, New Zealand, Pakistan, South Africa, Sri Lanka, West Indies	8
2010	none	0
2012	none	0
2014	Bangladesh, Ireland	2
2016	none	0
2018	none	0
2020	Thailand	1
2023	none	0
2024	Scotland	1
2026	Netherlands	1
2028		
Total		13

== Records ==
As of 6 July 2026

T20 World Cup records
Batting
Most runs	(New Zealand) Suzie Bates	1,254 (2009 – 2026)
Highest score	(Australia) Meg Lanning v Ireland at Sylhet	126 (2014)
Highest partnership	(England) Nat Sciver-Brunt & Heather Knight v Thailand at Canberra	169* (2020)
Most runs in a tournament	(England) Danni Wyatt-Hodge	302 (2026)
Bowling
Most wickets	(South Africa) Shabnim Ismail	51 (2009 – 2026)
Best bowling figures	(Cricket West Indies) Deandra Dottin v Bangladesh at Providence	5/5 (2018)
Most wickets in a tournament	(New Zealand) Amelia Kerr	15 (2024)
Fielding
Most dismissals (wicket-keeper)	(Australia) Alyssa Healy	32 (2010 – 2024)
Most catches (fielder)	(New Zealand) Suzie Bates	28 (2009 – 2026)
Team
Highest team total	England (v Sri Lanka) at Birmingham	219/1 (2026)
Lowest team total	Bangladesh (v West Indies) at Providence	46 (2018)
