= 2026 Women's T20 World Cup =

International cricket tournament

2026 ICC Women's T20 World Cup
- Dates: 12 June – 5 July 2026
- Administrator: International Cricket Council
- Cricket format: Women's Twenty20 International
- Tournament format(s): Group stage and knockout stage
- Host: England
- Champions: Australia (7th title)
- Runners-up: England
- Participants: 12
- Matches: 33
- Attendance: 245,815 (7,449 per match)
- Player of the series: (Australia) Beth Mooney
- Most runs: (England) Danni Wyatt-Hodge (302)
- Most wickets: (India) Shree Charani (14)
- Official website: icc-cricket.com

The 2026 ICC Women's T20 World Cup was the tenth edition of the ICC Women's T20 World Cup and was hosted by the England and Wales Cricket Board from 12 June to 5 July 2026. England had previously hosted the inaugural competition in 2009. A total of twelve teams competed in 33 matches across seven venues in England.

The number of participants was increased from ten teams to twelve, which included a host team, top five teams from the previous edition, the two highest-ranked teams in the ICC Women's T20I Team Rankings not already qualified, and four other teams determined through a series of qualifiers. Netherlands qualified for the Women's T20 World Cup for the first time.

New Zealand were the defending champions and were eliminated in the group stage. Australia defeated England by 7 wickets in the final to win their record seventh title. Teams that finished higher from the continents of Africa, Asia, Europe and Oceania: South Africa, India, Great Britain (taking the place of England) and Australia respectively qualified for Cricket at the 2028 Summer Olympics.

== Background ==
The ICC Women's T20 World Cup is a biennial world cup for women's cricket in Women's Twenty20 International (WT20I) format, organised by the International Cricket Council (ICC). It was first played in 2009 in England, and the 2026 tournament marked its tenth edition. The ninth edition, held in 2024 in the United Arab Emirates, was contested by 10 teams, and was won by New Zealand, who defeated South Africa in the final.

=== Host selection ===
In July 2022, as part of the 2024–2027 ICC women's hosts cycle, the ICC announced that the 2026 Women's T20 World Cup would be played in England. The England and Wales Cricket Board (ECB) had previously hosted the inaugural competition in 2009.

=== Format ===
The 12 qualifying teams were divided into two groups of six teams each. In the group stage, each team played every other team in its group once in a round-robin format. The top two teams from each group advanced to the knockout stage, which consisted of two semi-finals, with the winners facing off in the final.

=== Schedule ===
In the 2025–2029 ICC Women's Future Tours Programme, the tournament was scheduled to be held in June–July 2026. The ICC announced the tournament schedule on 24 February 2026, with the tournament scheduled to take place from 12 June to 5 July 2026. The teams will play 33 matches across seven venues in England. On 10 July 2025, the ICC announced that warm-up matches would be played at two venues in England and one in Wales. Full list of warm-up fixtures were revealed on 13 May 2026.

=== Prize money ===
The ICC allocated a pool of $8.76 million in prize money for the tournament, a 10% increase from 2024. The winners would be given at least $2.34 million, with each team receiving an additional $31,154 for each match they won, excluding the semi-finals and final. Unlike the previous editions, instead of positional prizes for teams that failed to advance to the knockout stage, a minimum participation fee is given to all the teams.

Prize money allocation for the tournament
Place	Teams	Amount	
Place	Teams	per side	Total
Champions	1	$2.34 million	$2.34 million
Runners-up	1	$1.17 million	$1.17 million
Semi-finalists	2	$675,000	$1.35 million
Participation fee	12	$247,500	$2.97 million
Match winners	30	$31,154	$934,620
Total	12	$8.76 million	

=== Marketing ===
On 27 May 2026, the ICC announced that the opening ceremony for the tournament would be held on 12 June ahead of the opening match at Edgbaston Cricket Ground in Birmingham. The ceremony featured Emma Kingston and Zizi Strallen who portrayed Elphaba and Glinda along with the full cast from the British production of the musical Wicked performing in a lively erected set marking the 20th anniversary of the musical's British iteration. A promotional event "Captains' Carnival", featuring all the team captains was held on 7 June at the Waterloo Bridge in London. On 2 July, the ICC announced that a closing ceremony would be held on 5 July ahead of the final match at Lord's in London with performances from Rita Ora and Clean Bandit.

== Qualification ==
The host team England, along with the top five teams from the 2024 tournament: Australia, India, New Zealand, South Africa and the West Indies; directly qualified for the 2026 tournament. The remaining two direct qualification places were allocated to the next best-ranked teams in the ICC Women's T20I Team Rankings as on 20 October 2024, that had not finished in the top six: Pakistan and Sri Lanka. The four remaining places were filled through the global qualifier in February 2026: Bangladesh, Ireland, Netherlands and Scotland. Netherlands qualified for the women's T20 World Cup for the first time.

Highlighted are the countries that participated in the 2026 Women's T20 World Cup qualification pathway. Qualified directly (hosts, top 5 from the previous tournament, or via WT20I Rankings) Qualified via the global qualifier Participated in the qualifiers but failed to qualify

Teams qualified for the tournament
Method of qualification	No. of teams	Teams	WT20I ranking (Note: The ICC Women's T20I Team Rankings as of 11 June 2026, before the start of the tournament.)
Host	1	England	2
2024 Women's T20 World Cup (Top 5 teams from the previous tournament, excluding hosts)	5	Australia	1
2024 Women's T20 World Cup (Top 5 teams from the previous tournament, excluding hosts)	5	India	3
2024 Women's T20 World Cup (Top 5 teams from the previous tournament, excluding hosts)	5	New Zealand	4
2024 Women's T20 World Cup (Top 5 teams from the previous tournament, excluding hosts)	5	South Africa	5
2024 Women's T20 World Cup (Top 5 teams from the previous tournament, excluding hosts)	5	West Indies	7
ICC Women's T20I Team Rankings	2	Pakistan	8
ICC Women's T20I Team Rankings	2	Sri Lanka	6
2026 Women's T20 World Cup Global Qualifier	4	Bangladesh	10
2026 Women's T20 World Cup Global Qualifier	4	Ireland	9
2026 Women's T20 World Cup Global Qualifier	4	Netherlands	14
2026 Women's T20 World Cup Global Qualifier	4	Scotland	11
Total	12		

== Venues ==
In May 2025, the ECB confirmed the seven venues for the World Cup: Edgbaston Cricket Ground in Birmingham, County Ground in Bristol, Headingley Cricket Ground in Leeds, Lord's and The Oval in London, Old Trafford Cricket Ground in Manchester and Rose Bowl in Southampton.

Venues in England
A map of England with pin-points on 2026 Women's T20 World Cup venues
Birmingham	Bristol	Leeds	London
Edgbaston Cricket Ground	County Ground	Headingley Cricket Ground	Lord's
Capacity: 25,000	Capacity: 17,500	Capacity: 18,350	Capacity: 31,100
Matches: 4	Matches: 6	Matches: 5	Matches: 4 (Final)
Edgbaston Cricket Ground in	Bristol County Ground in	Headingley Cricket Ground in	Lord's in 2017
London	Manchester	Southampton	
The Oval	Old Trafford Cricket Ground	Rose Bowl	
Capacity: 27,500	Capacity: 26,000	Capacity: 25,000	
Matches: 3 (Semi-finals)	Matches: 5	Matches: 6	
The Oval in	Old Trafford Cricket Ground in 2014	Rose Bowl in	

== Squads ==
Each team was allowed a maximum squad size of 15 players and was required to submit the provisional squad to the ICC by 1 May 2026. The teams were allowed to make changes to the squads until 1 June 2026. Any changes after this required permission from the ICC's event technical committee.

== Match officials ==
On 28 May 2026, the ICC released the list of match referees and umpires for the tournament. On 21 June 2026, Lauren Agenbag was ruled out of the tournament due to illness and was replaced by Saleema Imtiaz.

Match referees

- (New Zealand) Trudy Anderson
- (South Africa) Shandre Fritz
- (India) G. S. Lakshmi
- (Sri Lanka) Michell Pereira

Umpires

- (South Africa) Lauren Agenbag
- (New Zealand) Kim Cotton
- (England) Anna Harris
- (Pakistan) Saleema Imtiaz
- (Bangladesh) Shathira Jakir
- (India) Narayanan Janani
- (South Africa) Kerrin Klaaste
- (Cricket West Indies) Candace la Borde
- (Sri Lanka) Nimali Perera
- (Australia) Claire Polosak
- (India) Vrinda Rathi
- (England) Sue Redfern
- (Australia) Eloise Sheridan
- (Cricket West Indies) Jacqueline Williams
- (India) Gayathri Venugopalan

== Warm-up matches ==
A total of 12 warm-up matches were played from 6 to 10 June, involving all 12 teams participating in the World Cup across two venues in England: County Cricket Ground in Derby and Haslegrave Ground in Loughborough and one venue in Wales at Sophia Gardens in Cardiff.

Warm-up match 1
6 June 2026
10:00 UTC+1
Scorecard

Scotland; 163/5 (20 overs)	v	Netherlands; 105 (20 overs)
Darcey Carter 33 (22); Silver Siegers 2/15 (3 overs)		Frederique Overdijk 28* (24); Katherine Fraser 3/21 (4 overs)

Scotland won by 58 runs
County Ground, Derby
Umpires: Candace la Borde (WI) and Nimali Perera (SL)

- Netherlands won the toss and elected to field.

Warm-up match 2
6 June 2026
10:00 UTC+1
Scorecard

South Africa; 136/8 (18 overs)	v	Ireland; 120 (17.4 overs)
Laura Wolvaardt 65 (37); Arlene Kelly 3/29 (3 overs)		Leah Paul 29 (27); Marizanne Kapp 4/24 (4 overs)

South Africa won by 15 runs
Haslegrave Ground, Loughborough
Umpires: Claire Polosak (Aus) and Eloise Sheridan (Aus)

- Ireland won the toss and elected to field.
- The match was reduced to 18 overs per side due to rain.

Warm-up match 3
6 June 2026
15:00 UTC+1 (N)
Scorecard

Pakistan; 168/8 (20 overs)	v	Sri Lanka; 169/1 (18.4 overs)
Fatima Sana 37 (26); Chethana Vimukthi 4/31 (4 overs)		Chamari Athapaththu 94 (58); Fatima Sana 1/20 (2 overs)

Sri Lanka won by 9 wickets
County Ground, Derby
Umpires: Shathira Jakir (Ban) and Vrinda Rathi (Ind)

- Pakistan won the toss and elected to bat.

Warm-up match 4
6 June 2026
15:00 UTC+1 (N)
Scorecard

New Zealand; 193/3 (20 overs)	v	Bangladesh; 125/8 (20 overs)
Amelia Kerr 51* (28); Ritu Moni 2/36 (4 overs)		Nigar Sultana 32* (33); Nensi Patel 4/18 (3 overs)

New Zealand won by 68 runs
Haslegrave Ground, Loughborough
Umpires: Kerrin Klaaste (SA) and Sue Redfern (Eng)

- Bangladesh won the toss and elected to field.

Warm-up match 5
8 June 2026
10:00 UTC+1
Scorecard

India; 179/8 (20 overs)	v	West Indies; 153/8 (20 overs)
Bharti Fulmali 56* (40); Afy Fletcher 4/23 (4 overs)		Deandra Dottin 49 (44); Shreyanka Patil 4/36 (4 overs)

India won by 26 runs
Sophia Gardens, Cardiff
Umpires: Kim Cotton (NZ) and Shathira Jakir (Ban)

- West Indies won the toss and elected to field.

Warm-up match 6
8 June 2026
15:00 UTC+1 (N)
Scorecard

England; 157/6 (20 overs)	v	Australia; 158/5 (18.2 overs)
Alice Capsey 45 (36); Alana King 2/10 (2 overs)		Ellyse Perry 64 (44); Lauren Bell 2/22 (3.2 overs)

Australia won by 5 wickets
Sophia Gardens, Cardiff
Umpires: Vrinda Rathi (Ind) and Jacqueline Williams (WI)

- Australia won the toss and elected to field.

Warm-up match 7
9 June 2026
10:00 UTC+1
Scorecard

Scotland; 191/5 (20 overs)	v	Pakistan; 62/5 (9 overs)
Kathryn Bryce 94 (43); Sadia Iqbal 1/23 (3 overs)		Muneeba Ali 20 (22); Rachel Slater 2/11 (2 overs)

Scotland won by 41 runs (DLS method)
County Ground, Derby
Umpires: Anna Harris (Eng) and Nimali Perera (SL)

- Pakistan won the toss and elected to field.
- Pakistan innings curtailed at 9 overs due to rain; DLS par score was 104.

Warm-up match 8
9 June 2026
10:00 UTC+1
Scorecard

Ireland; 143/9 (20 overs)	v	Bangladesh; 132/6 (20 overs)
Rebecca Stokell 30 (26); Sanjida Akter Meghla 3/26 (4 overs)		Juairiya Ferdous 50 (48); Aimee Maguire 4/20 (4 overs)

Ireland won by 11 runs
Haslegrave Ground, Loughborough
Umpires: Narayanan Janani (Ind) and Sue Redfern (Eng)

- Bangladesh won the toss and elected to field.

Warm-up match 9
9 June 2026
15:00 UTC+1 (N)
Scorecard

Netherlands; 143/6 (20 overs)	v	Sri Lanka; 146/3 (19.1 overs)
Heather Siegers 48 (32); Malki Madara 1/12 (3 overs)		Hansima Karunaratne 50* (41); Myrthe van den Raad 1/15 (3 overs)

Sri Lanka won by 7 wickets
County Ground, Derby
Umpires: Vrinda Rathi (Ind) and Eloise Sheridan (Aus)

- Netherlands won the toss and elected to bat.

Warm-up match 10
9 June 2026
15:00 UTC+1 (N)
Scorecard

South Africa; 183/5 (20 overs)	v	New Zealand; 186/5 (19.4 overs)
Chloe Tryon 61 (26); Sophie Devine 2/16 (3 overs)		Amelia Kerr 61 (32); Ayabonga Khaka 2/42 (3.4 overs)

New Zealand won by 5 wickets
Haslegrave Ground, Loughborough
Umpires: Claire Polosak (Aus) and Gayathri Venugopalan (Ind)

- New Zealand won the toss and elected to field.

Warm-up match 11
10 June 2026
10:00 UTC+1
Scorecard

England; 171/6 (20 overs)	v	India; 166 (19.5 overs)
Amy Jones 64 (45); Shreyanka Patil 2/29 (4 overs)		Richa Ghosh 68 (36); Linsey Smith 3/42 (3.5 overs)

England won by 5 runs
Sophia Gardens, Cardiff
Umpires: Candace la Borde (WI) and Kim Cotton (NZ)

- India won the toss and elected to field.

Warm-up match 12
10 June 2026
15:00 UTC+1 (N)
Scorecard

West Indies; 131 (20 overs)	v	Australia; 132/4 (15 overs)
Deandra Dottin 46 (38); Ashleigh Gardner 2/17 (3 overs)		Georgia Voll 77* (48); Qiana Joseph 1/6 (2 overs)

Australia won by 6 wickets
Sophia Gardens, Cardiff
Umpires: Lauren Agenbag (SA) and Kerrin Klaaste (SA)

- West Indies won the toss and elected to bat.

== Group stage ==
The ICC announced the groups and fixtures on 24 February 2026, with the group stage played from 12 to 28 June. The 12 teams were divided into two groups of six, with each team facing the other teams in the group once. The group stage featured a total of 30 matches. The opening match was played between England and Sri Lanka at Edgbaston on 12 June.

Group A	Group B
Australia; Bangladesh; India; Netherlands; Pakistan; South Africa	England; Ireland; New Zealand; Scotland; Sri Lanka; West Indies

=== Group A ===
Group A standings
Pos	Team	Pld	W	L	NR	Pts	NRR	Qualification
1	Australia	5	5	0	0	10	3.882	Advanced to the knockout stage
2	South Africa	5	4	1	0	8	0.633	Advanced to the knockout stage
3	India	5	3	2	0	6	1.718	Eliminated
4	Bangladesh	5	2	3	0	4	−0.710	Eliminated
5	Pakistan	5	1	4	0	2	−1.872	Eliminated
6	Netherlands	5	0	5	0	0	−3.276	Eliminated

Source: Cricinfo
Rules for classification: 1) Points; 2) Wins; 3) Net run rate; 4) Results of games between tied teams; 5) WT20I Rankings ahead of the tournament

Match 3
13 June 2026
14:30 UTC+1
Scorecard

Australia; 172/8 (20 overs)	v	South Africa; 107 (16.4 overs)
Phoebe Litchfield 50 (24); Nonkululeko Mlaba 2/22 (4 overs)		Laura Wolvaardt 44 (39); Georgia Wareham 3/13 (2.4 overs)

Australia won by 65 runs
Old Trafford Cricket Ground, Manchester
Attendance: 7,543
Umpires: Narayanan Janani (Ind) and Nimali Perera (SL)
Player of the match: Georgia Wareham (Aus)

- Australia won the toss and elected to bat.

Match 5
14 June 2026
10:30 UTC+1
Scorecard

Netherlands; 139/8 (20 overs)	v	Bangladesh; 141/4 (19.1 overs)
Babette de Leede 50 (45); Marufa Akter 2/31 (4 overs)		Juairiya Ferdous 50 (33); Caroline de Lange 2/27 (4 overs)

Bangladesh won by 6 wickets
Edgbaston Cricket Ground, Birmingham
Umpires: Sue Redfern (Eng) and Gayathri Venugopalan (Ind)
Player of the match: Juairiya Ferdous (Ban)

- Netherlands won the toss and elected to bat.

Match 6
14 June 2026
14:30 UTC+1
Scorecard

India; 170/6 (20 overs)	v	Pakistan; 106 (17 overs)
Smriti Mandhana 66 (44); Fatima Sana 2/33 (4 overs)		Muneeba Ali 41 (35); Deepti Sharma 5/10 (4 overs)

India won by 64 runs
Edgbaston Cricket Ground, Birmingham
Attendance: 18,814
Umpires: Claire Polosak (Aus) and Jacqueline Williams (WI)
Player of the match: Deepti Sharma (Ind)

- India won the toss and elected to bat.

Match 9
17 June 2026
10:30 UTC+1
Scorecard

Bangladesh; 77/8 (20 overs)	v	Australia; 78/1 (9.3 overs)
Nigar Sultana 27 (47); Ellyse Perry 2/14 (3 overs)		Georgia Voll 45* (32); Marufa Akter 1/28 (4 overs)

Australia won by 9 wickets
Headingley Cricket Ground, Leeds
Umpires: Lauren Agenbag (SA) and Candace la Borde (WI)
Player of the match: Ellyse Perry (Aus)

- Australia won the toss and elected to field.

Match 10
17 June 2026
14:30 UTC+1
Scorecard

India; 209/5 (20 overs)	v	Netherlands; 114 (17.3 overs)
Smriti Mandhana 74 (47); Caroline de Lange 2/32 (4 overs)		Babette de Leede 28 (27); Shree Charani 4/19 (4 overs)

India won by 95 runs
Headingley Cricket Ground, Leeds
Umpires: Nimali Perera (SL) and Sue Redfern (Eng)
Player of the match: Smriti Mandhana (Ind)

- Netherlands won the toss and elected to field.

Match 11
17 June 2026
18:30 UTC+1 (D/N)
Scorecard

Pakistan; 126/9 (20 overs)	v	South Africa; 127/8 (16.5 overs)
Fatima Sana 55* (38); Marizanne Kapp 3/23 (4 overs)		Annerie Dercksen 52 (35); Fatima Sana 3/16 (2.5 overs)

South Africa won by 2 wickets
Edgbaston Cricket Ground, Birmingham
Umpires: Kim Cotton (NZ) and Anna Harris (Eng)
Player of the match: Annerie Dercksen (SA)

- Pakistan won the toss and elected to bat.

Match 14
20 June 2026
10:30 UTC+1
Scorecard

Australia; 219/6 (20 overs)	v	Netherlands; 121/3 (20 overs)
Beth Mooney 74* (42); Iris Zwilling 3/52 (4 overs)		Babette de Leede 56* (57); Kim Garth 2/20 (4 overs)

Australia won by 98 runs
Rose Bowl, Southampton
Umpires: Kim Cotton (NZ) and Anna Harris (Eng)
Player of the match: Beth Mooney (Aus)

- Netherlands won the toss and elected to field.
- Babette de Leede (Ned) played in her 100th T20I.

Match 15
20 June 2026
14:30 UTC+1
Scorecard

Bangladesh; 123/6 (20 overs)	v	Pakistan; 100/8 (20 overs)
Shorna Akter 39* (22); Fatima Sana 2/18 (4 overs)		Muneeba Ali 25 (30); Nahida Akter 3/18 (4 overs)

Bangladesh won by 23 runs
Rose Bowl, Southampton
Umpires: Gayathri Venugopalan (Ind) and Jacqueline Williams (WI)
Player of the match: Shorna Akter (Ban)

- Bangladesh won the toss and elected to bat.
- Pakistan were eliminated as a result of this match.

Match 18
21 June 2026
14:30 UTC+1
Scorecard

India; 158/7 (20 overs)	v	South Africa; 161/4 (19.1 overs)
Shafali Verma 31 (15); Marizanne Kapp 2/27 (4 overs)		Marizanne Kapp 81* (45); Shree Charani 3/24 (4 overs)

South Africa won by 6 wickets
Old Trafford Cricket Ground, Manchester
Umpires: Eloise Sheridan (Aus) and Nimali Perera (SL)
Player of the match: Marizanne Kapp (SA)

- India won the toss and elected to bat.
- Harmanpreet Kaur (Ind) played in her 200th T20I.
- Prema Rawat (Ind) made her T20I debut.

Match 21
23 June 2026
18:30 UTC+1 (D/N)
Scorecard

Australia; 199/7 (20 overs)	v	Pakistan; 86 (13.4 overs)
Ellyse Perry 71 (48); Sadia Iqbal 2/31 (4 overs)		Muneeba Ali 32 (25); Sophie Molineux 2/6 (2 overs)

Australia won by 113 runs
Headingley Cricket Ground, Leeds
Umpires: Vrinda Rathi (Ind) and Sue Redfern (Eng)
Player of the match: Ellyse Perry (Aus)

- Australia won the toss and elected to bat.
- Australia qualified for their tenth consecutive T20 World Cup semi-final as a result of this match.

Match 23
25 June 2026
14:30 UTC+1
Scorecard

Bangladesh; 136/8 (20 overs)	v	India; 139/5 (16.5 overs)
Juairiya Ferdous 33 (31); Radha Yadav 3/28 (4 overs)		Shafali Verma 53 (34); Ritu Moni 2/29 (4 overs)

India won by 5 wickets
Old Trafford Cricket Ground, Manchester
Umpires: Kim Cotton (NZ) and Saleema Imtiaz (Pak)
Player of the match: Shafali Verma (Ind)

- Bangladesh won the toss and elected to bat.

Match 24
25 June 2026
18:30 UTC+1 (D/N)
Scorecard

South Africa; 208/1 (20 overs)	v	Netherlands; 120/8 (20 overs)
Tazmin Brits 114* (69); Hannah Landheer 1/34 (4 overs)		Phebe Molkenboer 41 (41); Ayabonga Khaka 3/19 (3 overs)

South Africa won by 88 runs
County Ground, Bristol
Umpires: Shathira Jakir (Ban) and Claire Polosak (Aus)
Player of the match: Tazmin Brits (SA)

- Netherlands won the toss and elected to field.
- Tazmin Brits (SA) scored her maiden century in T20Is. She also scored her 2,000th run in T20Is.

Match 26
27 June 2026
10:30 UTC+1
Scorecard

Pakistan; 126/6 (20 overs)	v	Netherlands; 89 (18 overs)
Gull Feroza 63* (52); Iris Zwilling 2/19 (4 overs)		Babette de Leede 30 (41); Fatima Sana 3/12 (3 overs)

Pakistan won by 37 runs
County Ground, Bristol
Attendance: 3,644
Umpires: Kerrin Klaaste (SA) and Vrinda Rathi (Ind)
Player of the match: Gull Feroza (Pak)

- Pakistan won the toss and elected to bat.
- Netherlands were eliminated as a result of this match.

Match 29
28 June 2026
10:30 UTC+1
Scorecard

Bangladesh; 117/5 (20 overs)	v	South Africa; 118/6 (19.2 overs)
Sobhana Mostary 42 (48); Nonkululeko Mlaba 2/22 (4 overs)		Annerie Dercksen 45 (45); Nahida Akter 2/24 (4 overs)

South Africa won by 4 wickets
Lord's, London
Umpires: Kim Cotton (NZ) and Eloise Sheridan (Aus)
Player of the match: Marizanne Kapp (SA)

- Bangladesh won the toss and elected to bat.
- Marizanne Kapp (SA) took her 100th wicket in T20Is.
- Bangladesh were eliminated as a result of this match.

Match 30
28 June 2026
14:30 UTC+1
Scorecard

India; 170/4 (20 overs)	v	Australia; 172/4 (19 overs)
Harmanpreet Kaur 56 (27); Sophie Molineux 2/46 (4 overs)		Ellyse Perry 56 (38); Shree Charani 2/32 (4 overs)

Australia won by 6 wickets
Lord's, London
Attendance: 27,163
Umpires: Nimali Perera (SL) and Jacqueline Williams (WI)
Player of the match: Ellyse Perry (Aus)

- India won the toss and elected to bat.
- Deepti Sharma (Ind) surpassed Jhulan Goswami to become the highest wicket-taker in international women's cricket.
- This was the highest successful run chase in the T20 World Cup.
- South Africa qualified for their fourth consecutive and overall fifth T20 World Cup semi-final while India were eliminated as a result of this match.

=== Group B ===
Group B standings
Pos	Team	Pld	W	L	NR	Pts	NRR	Qualification
1	England (H)	5	5	0	0	10	2.134	Advanced to the knockout stage
2	West Indies	5	3	2	0	6	−0.147	Advanced to the knockout stage
3	Sri Lanka	5	3	2	0	6	−0.725	Eliminated
4	New Zealand	5	2	3	0	4	−0.118	Eliminated
5	Scotland	5	1	4	0	2	−0.232	Eliminated
6	Ireland	5	1	4	0	2	−0.875	Eliminated

Source: ESPNcricinfo
Rules for classification: 1) Points; 2) Wins; 3) Net run rate; 4) Results of games between tied teams; 5) WT20I Rankings ahead of the tournament
(H) Hosts

Match 1
12 June 2026
18:30 UTC+1 (D/N)
Scorecard

England; 219/1 (20 overs)	v	Sri Lanka; 132 (20 overs)
Danni Wyatt-Hodge 105* (62); Malki Madara 1/51 (4 overs)		Nilakshi de Silva 37 (32); Freya Kemp 4/21 (4 overs)

England won by 87 runs
Edgbaston Cricket Ground, Birmingham
Attendance: 14,865
Umpires: Eloise Sheridan (Aus) and Jacqueline Williams (WI)
Player of the match: Danni Wyatt-Hodge (Eng)

- Sri Lanka won the toss and elected to field.
- England's 219 was the highest innings total in the T20 World Cup.

Match 2
13 June 2026
10:30 UTC+1
Scorecard

Scotland; 161/5 (20 overs)	v	Ireland; 121 (19.1 overs)
Kathryn Bryce 60 (39); Ava Canning 3/27 (4 overs)		Amy Hunter 39 (36); Kirstie Gordon 3/16 (4 overs)

Scotland won by 40 runs
Old Trafford Cricket Ground, Manchester
Attendance: 7,543
Umpires: Shathira Jakir (Ban) and Candace la Borde (WI)
Player of the match: Kathryn Bryce (Sco)

- Ireland won the toss and elected to field.
- Scotland recorded their first win in the T20 World Cup.

Match 4
13 June 2026
18:30 UTC+1 (D/N)
Scorecard

New Zealand; 162/6 (20 overs)	v	West Indies; 163/3 (19.5 overs)
Brooke Halliday 40 (32); Aaliyah Alleyne 4/27 (4 overs)		Shemaine Campbelle 90* (62); Jess Kerr 2/17 (4 overs)

West Indies won by 7 wickets
Rose Bowl, Southampton
Umpires: Anna Harris (Eng) and Vrinda Rathi (Ind)
Player of the match: Shemaine Campbelle (WI)

- West Indies won the toss and elected to field.

Match 7
16 June 2026
14:30 UTC+1
Scorecard

New Zealand; 150/6 (20 overs)	v	Sri Lanka; 153/5 (19.4 overs)
Sophie Devine 45 (30); Kavisha Dilhari 2/35 (4 overs)		Nilakshi de Silva 54* (37); Nensi Patel 2/23 (4 overs)

Sri Lanka won by 5 wickets
Rose Bowl, Southampton
Attendance: 9,021
Umpires: Kerrin Klaaste (SA) and Gayathri Venugopalan (Ind)
Player of the match: Nilakshi de Silva (SL)

- New Zealand won the toss and elected to bat.

Match 8
16 June 2026
18:30 UTC+1 (D/N)
Scorecard

Ireland; 118/9 (20 overs)	v	England; 119/6 (17.3 overs)
Louise Little 26* (15); Sophie Ecclestone 3/22 (4 overs)		Nat Sciver-Brunt 48 (37); Orla Prendergast 2/17 (4 overs)

England won by 4 wickets
Rose Bowl, Southampton
Attendance: 9,021
Umpires: Narayanan Janani (Ind) and Vrinda Rathi (Ind)
Player of the match: Sophie Ecclestone (Eng)

- England won the toss and elected to field.

Match 12
18 June 2026
18:30 UTC+1 (D/N)
Scorecard

West Indies; 153/6 (20 overs)	v	Scotland; 146 (20 overs)
Stafanie Taylor 47* (19); Katherine Fraser 2/34 (4 overs)		Darcey Carter 59 (66); Aaliyah Alleyne 3/11 (2 overs)

West Indies won by 7 runs
Headingley Cricket Ground, Leeds
Umpires: Kerrin Klaaste (SA) and Claire Polosak (Aus)
Player of the match: Stafanie Taylor (WI)

- Scotland won the toss and elected to field.

Match 13
19 June 2026
18:30 UTC+1 (D/N)
Scorecard

New Zealand; 140/6 (20 overs)	v	Ireland; 136/4 (20 overs)
Izzy Sharp 36 (28); Orla Prendergast 2/26 (4 overs); Cara Murray 2/26 (4 overs)		Orla Prendergast 59 (53); Amelia Kerr 2/23 (4 overs)

New Zealand won by 4 runs
Rose Bowl, Southampton
Umpires: Sue Redfern (Eng) and Eloise Sheridan (Aus)
Player of the match: Amelia Kerr (NZ)

- Ireland won the toss and elected to field.

Match 16
20 June 2026
18:30 UTC+1 (D/N)
Scorecard

England; 200/5 (20 overs)	v	Scotland; 162/7 (20 overs)
Sophia Dunkley 57 (37); Kirstie Gordon 2/30 (4 overs)		Sarah Bryce 34 (24); Sophie Ecclestone 2/23 (4 overs)

England won by 38 runs
Headingley Cricket Ground, Leeds
Umpires: Kerrin Klaaste (SA) and Nimali Perera (SL)
Player of the match: Sophia Dunkley (Eng)

- Scotland won the toss and elected to field.

Match 17
21 June 2026
10:30 UTC+1
Scorecard

Sri Lanka; 98 (19.4 overs)	v	West Indies; 99/5 (16.1 overs)
Nilakshi de Silva 30 (26); Hayley Matthews 3/15 (4 overs)		Stafanie Taylor 27* (25); Kavisha Dilhari 2/22 (4 overs)

West Indies won by 5 wickets
County Ground, Bristol
Umpires: Narayanan Janani (Ind) and Shathira Jakir (Ban)
Player of the match: Hayley Matthews (WI)

- West Indies won the toss and elected to field.

Match 19
23 June 2026
10:30 UTC+1
Scorecard

Scotland; 131/7 (20 overs)	v	New Zealand; 132/4 (18.2 overs)
Darcey Carter 72* (52); Amelia Kerr 3/17 (4 overs)		Izzy Sharp 62 (43); Kathryn Bryce 2/13 (3 overs)

New Zealand won by 6 wickets
County Ground, Bristol
Umpires: Saleema Imtiaz (Pak) and Claire Polosak (Aus)
Player of the match: Izzy Sharp (NZ)

- New Zealand won the toss and elected to field.

Match 20
23 June 2026
14:30 UTC+1
Scorecard

Ireland; 130/5 (20 overs)	v	Sri Lanka; 134/1 (15.3 overs)
Gaby Lewis 59 (50); Nilakshi de Silva 1/12 (2 overs)		Chamari Athapaththu 106* (61); Orla Prendergast 1/22 (4 overs)

Sri Lanka won by 9 wickets
County Ground, Bristol
Umpires: Kim Cotton (NZ) and Candace la Borde (WI)
Player of the match: Chamari Athapaththu (SL)

- Sri Lanka won the toss and elected to field.
- Ireland were eliminated as a result of this match.

Match 22
24 June 2026
18:30 UTC+1 (D/N)
Scorecard

England; 186/7 (20 overs)	v	West Indies; 148/5 (20 overs)
Danni Wyatt-Hodge 65 (42); Ashmini Munisar 2/42 (4 overs)		Chinelle Henry 51* (30); Charlie Dean 2/31 (4 overs)

England won by 38 runs
Lord's, London
Umpires: Narayanan Janani (Ind) and Eloise Sheridan (Aus)
Player of the match: Danni Wyatt-Hodge (Eng)

- West Indies won the toss and elected to field.
- England qualified for their eighth T20 World Cup semi-final as a result of this match.

Match 25
26 June 2026
18:30 UTC+1 (D/N)
Scorecard

Scotland; 151/6 (20 overs)	v	Sri Lanka; 154/7 (19.5 overs)
Sarah Bryce 47* (33); Mithali Ayodhya 2/34 (4 overs)		Chamari Athapaththu 33 (16); Katherine Fraser 2/25 (4 overs)

Sri Lanka won by 3 wickets
Old Trafford Cricket Ground, Manchester
Umpires: Anna Harris (Eng) and Candace la Borde (WI)
Player of the match: Nilakshi de Silva (SL)

- Sri Lanka won the toss and elected to field.
- Scotland were eliminated as a result of this match.

Match 27
27 June 2026
14:30 UTC+1
Scorecard

West Indies; 128/7 (20 overs)	v	Ireland; 129/4 (18.1 overs)
Chinelle Henry 27* (21); Cara Murray 2/13 (4 overs)		Orla Prendergast 63 (44); Ashmini Munisar 2/28 (4 overs)

Ireland won by 6 wickets
County Ground, Bristol
Attendance: 3,644
Umpires: Shathira Jakir (Ban) and Claire Polosak (Aus)
Player of the match: Orla Prendergast (Ire)

- Ireland won the toss and elected to field.
- Ireland recorded their first win in the T20 World Cup.
- Sri Lanka were eliminated as a result of this match.

Match 28
27 June 2026
18:30 UTC+1 (D/N)
Scorecard

New Zealand; 163/6 (20 overs)	v	England; 164/1 (17.2 overs)
Amelia Kerr 42 (34); Dani Gibson 2/30 (3 overs)		Danni Wyatt-Hodge 89* (53); Nensi Patel 1/22 (3 overs)

England won by 9 wickets
The Oval, London
Attendance: 21,018
Umpires: Gayathri Venugopalan (Ind) and Jacqueline Williams (WI)
Player of the match: Danni Wyatt-Hodge (Eng)

- New Zealand won the toss and elected to bat.
- Suzie Bates, Sophie Devine, and Lea Tahuhu (NZ) all played in their last T20I.
- West Indies qualified for their second consecutive and overall seventh T20 World Cup semi-final while New Zealand were eliminated as a result of this match.

== Knockout stage ==
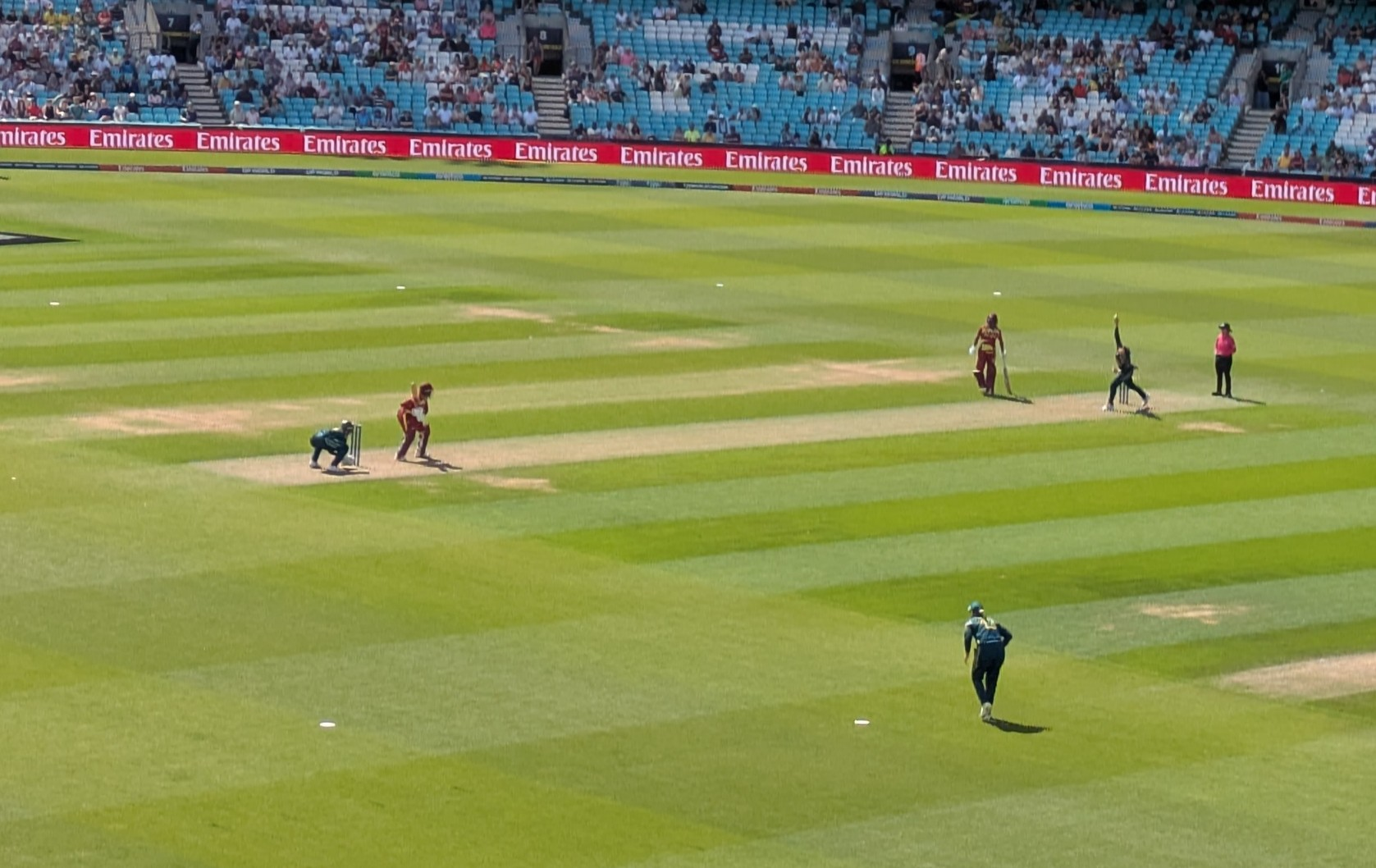
Georgia Wareham bowling to Shemaine Campbelle in the first semi-final between Australia and West Indies

The knockout stage consisted of two semi-finals played on 30 June and 2 July, and the final on 5 July. The semi-finals were played at The Oval with the final at Lord's. The group A winner and group B runner-up played in the first semi-final and group B winner and Group A runner-up in the second. If India had qualified, they would have played in the first semi-final.

Both semi-finals and the final had a reserve day available on 1, 3, and 6 July, respectively. If a reserve day came into play, the match would not have been restarted but instead resumed from the previous day's play, if there was any; with the play commencing at 14:30 (UTC+01). In the event of no minimum play (at least 10 overs per side) on the scheduled day and the reserve day, in the semi-finals, the team that finished higher in the group stage would have progressed to the final, and in the final, the teams would have been declared as joint-winners.

=== Bracket ===
Semi-finals
A1	Australia	127/2 (13 overs)
B2	West Indies	125/7 (20 overs)
B1	England	169/5 (20 overs)
A2	South Africa	129/8 (20 overs)

Final
SF1W	Australia	153/3 (17.1 overs)
SF2W	England	150/4 (20 overs)

=== Semi-finals ===
Semi-final 1
30 June 2026
14:30 UTC+1
Scorecard

West Indies; 125/7 (20 overs)	v	Australia; 127/2 (13 overs)
Hayley Matthews 30 (28); Ashleigh Gardner 2/13 (4 overs)		Beth Mooney 61* (36); Chinelle Henry 1/20 (2 overs)

Australia won by 8 wickets
The Oval, London
Attendance: 10,023
Umpires: Kim Cotton (NZ) and Vrinda Rathi (Ind)
Player of the match: Ashleigh Gardner (Aus)

- Australia won the toss and elected to field.
- Australia became the first team to qualify for eight T20 World Cup finals.

Semi-final 2
2 July 2026
18:30 UTC+1 (D/N)
Scorecard

England; 169/5 (20 overs)	v	South Africa; 129/8 (20 overs)
Nat Sciver-Brunt 75 (47); Nonkululeko Mlaba 2/25 (4 overs)		Tazmin Brits 51 (45); Lauren Bell 2/28 (4 overs)

England won by 40 runs
The Oval, London
Attendance: 21,128
Umpires: Eloise Sheridan (Aus) and Jacqueline Williams (WI)
Player of the match: Nat Sciver-Brunt (Eng)

- South Africa won the toss and elected to field.
- England qualified for their fifth T20 World Cup final.

=== Final ===
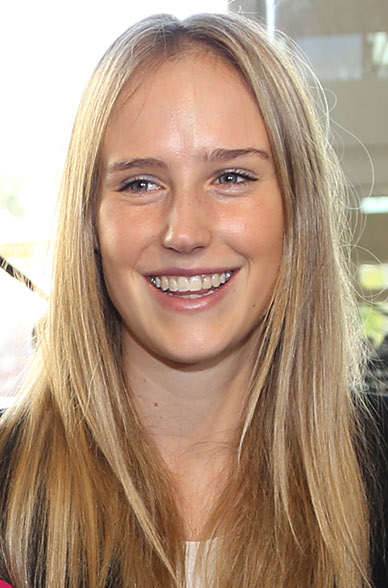
Ellyse Perry became the first cricketer (of any gender) to win nine World Cups across any format.

Australia won the toss and elected to field first. English captain Nat Sciver-Brunt was the only batter from her side to score 50+ with 58 runs not out; Freya Kemp scored 44 runs not out and Alice Capsey scored 23 runs while three other batters including both openers were dismissed for single-digit scores as England scored 150 runs for the loss of 4 wickets. Chasing the target, Australian opener Georgia Voll was dismissed for a single-digit score; Beth Mooney and Phoebe Litchfield put together a 100-run partnership scoring 64 runs and 48 runs respectively before being dismissed; Ellyse Perry and Ashleigh Gardner scored 13 runs in 7 balls to take the team to 153 runs for the loss of 3 wickets in 17.1 overs to win the match by 7 wickets.

This was Australia's seventh T20 World Cup victory after 2010, 2012, 2014, 2018, 2020 and 2023; and the fourteenth overall world cup victory having won the Women's Cricket World Cup seven times as well in 1978, 1982, 1988, 1997, 2005, 2013, and 2022. Mooney received the player of the match award for the final as well as the player of the tournament award; becoming the first cricketer to win both awards in a T20 World Cup twice. Perry became the first cricketer across both genders to win 9 world cups across both formats. The match was attended by 28,000 spectators.

5 July 2026
Scorecard

England; 150/4 (20 overs)	v	Australia; 153/3 (17.1 overs)

Australia won by 7 wickets
Lord's, London

== Statistics ==
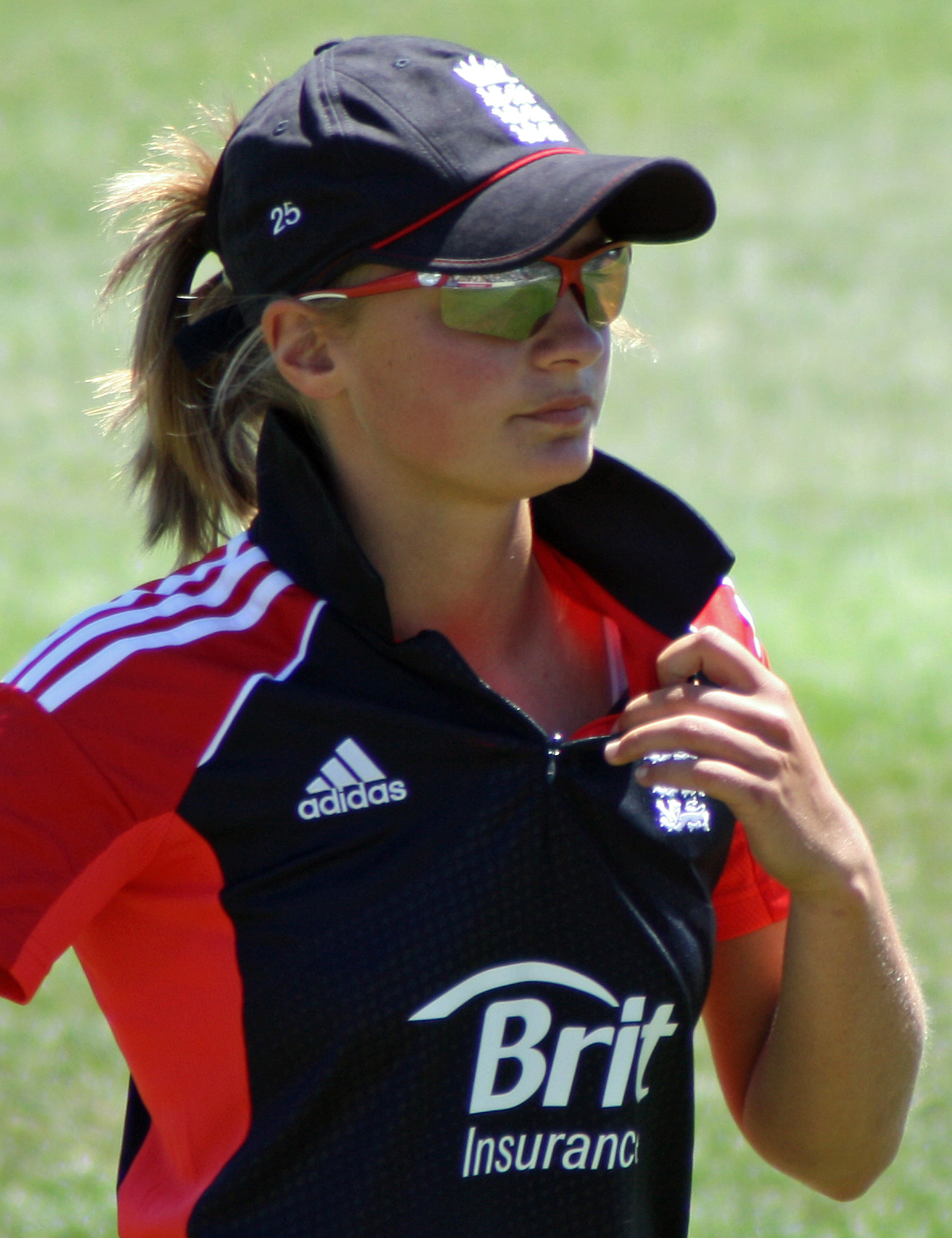
Danni Wyatt-Hodge became the first player to score over 300 runs in a single edition of the T20 World Cup.

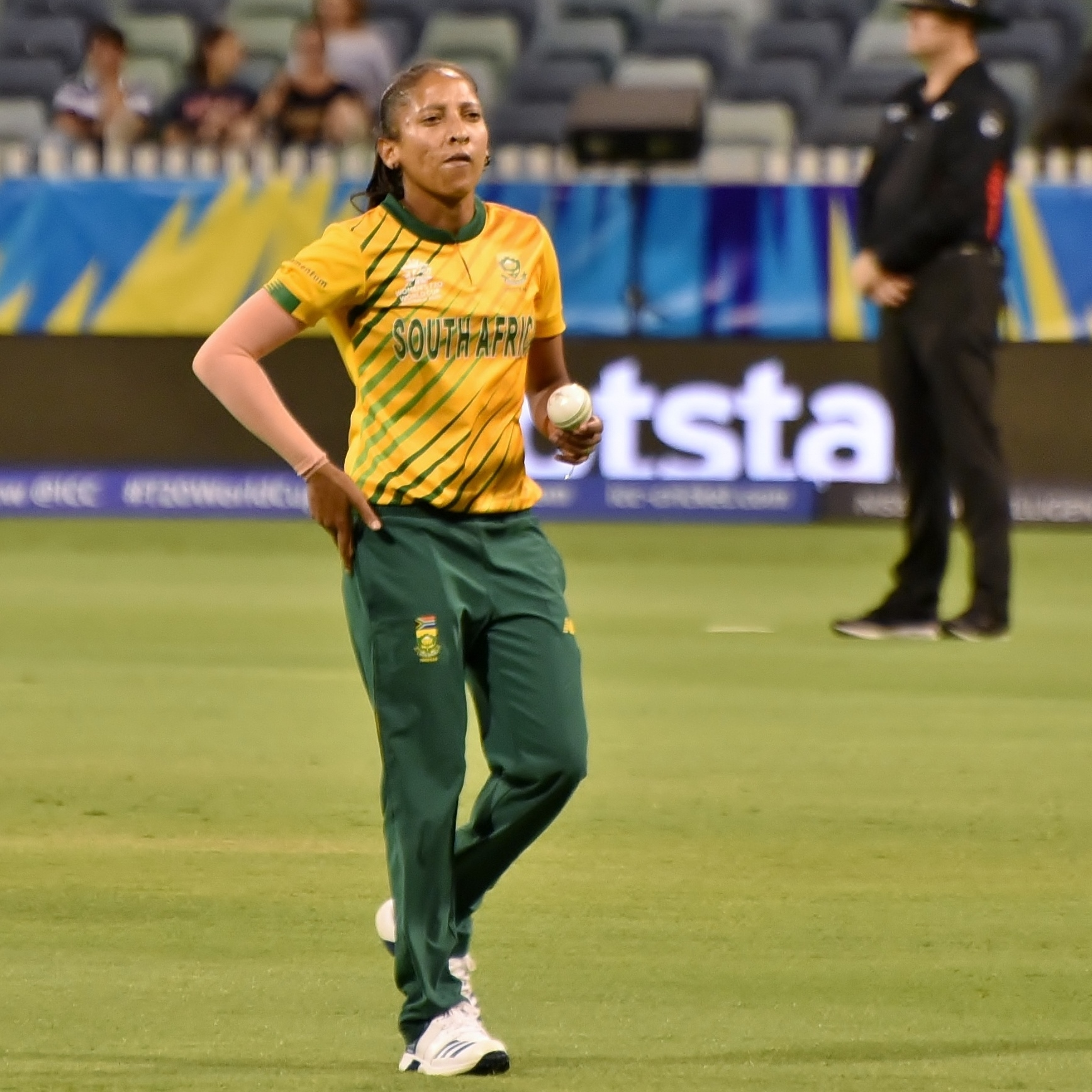
Shabnim Ismail became the first player to take over 50 overall wickets in the T20 World Cup.

Danni Wyatt-Hodge of England scored the most runs in the 2026 tournament (302 runs from 7 innings). She also became the first player to score over 300 runs in a single edition of the T20 World Cup, while scoring the most runs in a single T20 World Cup. A total of three centuries were scored in the 2026 tournament surpassing the previous high of two in a single edition of T20 World Cup (2020). The 2026 tournament also had twelve 100-run partnerships surpassing the previous high of six in a single edition of T20 World Cup (2023). Shree Charani of India took the most wickets in the 2026 tournament (14 wickets from 5 innings). Shabnim Ismail of South Africa became the first player to take 50+ overall wickets in the T20 World Cup.

Most runs
Runs	Player	Team
302	Danni Wyatt-Hodge	England
238	Beth Mooney	Australia
227	Nat Sciver-Brunt	England
225	Tazmin Brits	South Africa
208	Darcey Carter	Scotland

Most wickets
Wickets	Player	Team
14	Shree Charani	India
11	Sophie Molineux	Australia
11	Fatima Sana	Pakistan
10	Sophie Ecclestone	England
10	Hayley Matthews	West Indies
10	Charlie Dean	England

== Team of the tournament ==
On 6 July, the ICC announced its team of the tournament with Beth Mooney being named as player of the tournament and Sophie Molineux as the captain of the team.

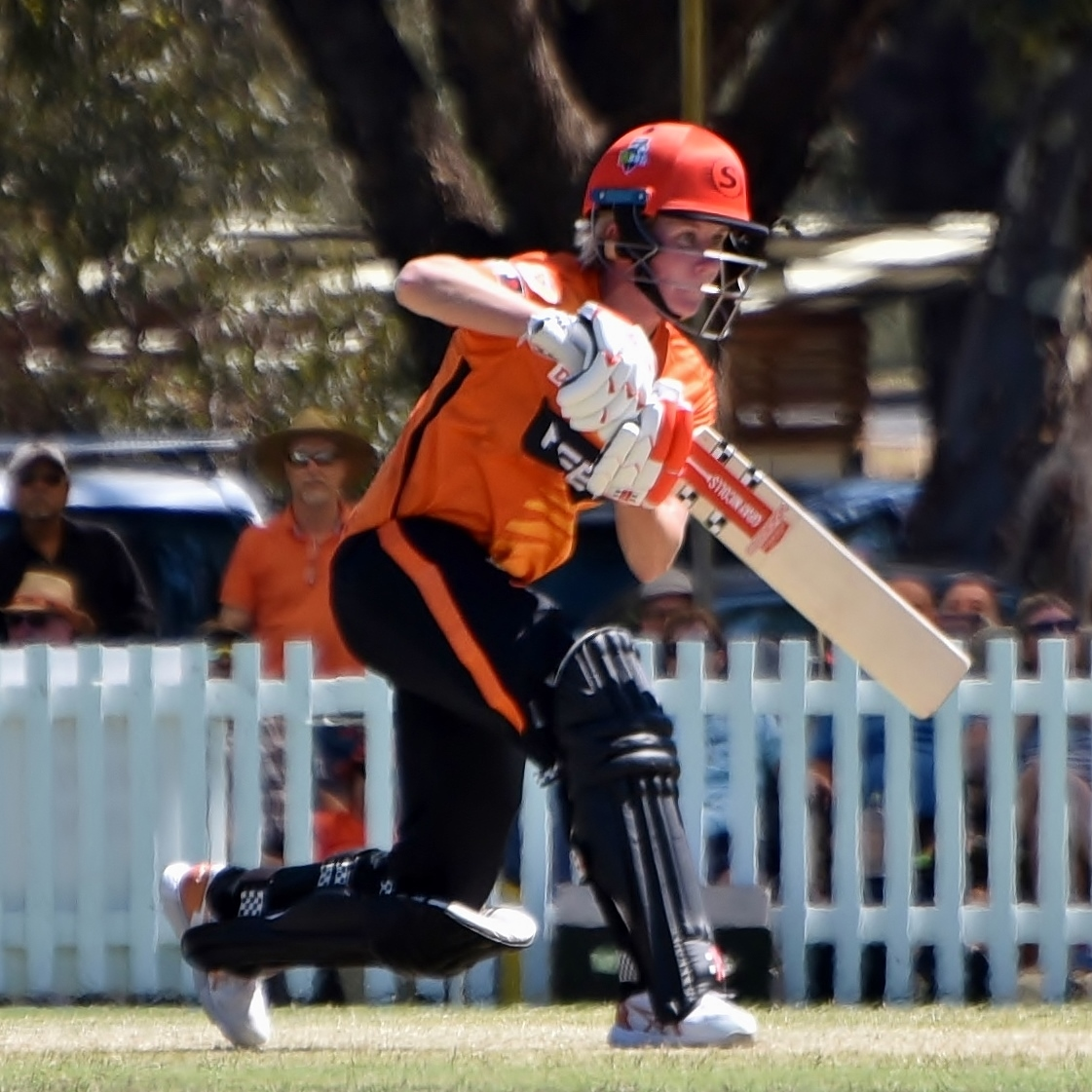
Beth Mooney received the player of the match award for the final as well as the player of the tournament award.

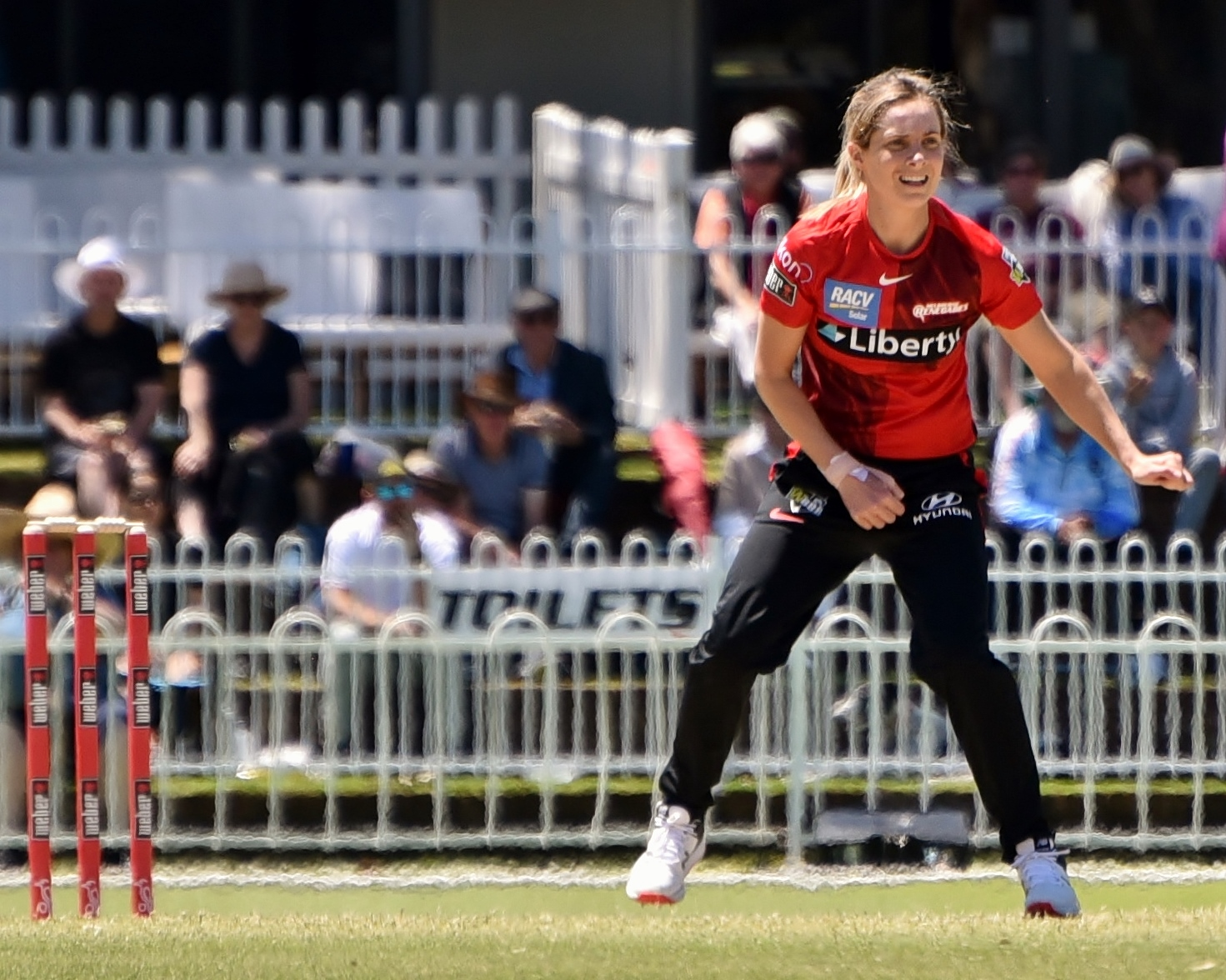
Sophie Molineux was named as the captain for the ICC's team of the tournament.

Team of the tournament
Player	Team	Role
Danni Wyatt-Hodge	England	Batter
Beth Mooney	Australia	Batter / Wicket-keeper
Nat Sciver-Brunt	England	All-rounder
Ellyse Perry	Australia	All-rounder
Orla Prendergast	Ireland	All-rounder
Nilakshi de Silva	Sri Lanka	Batter
Marizanne Kapp	South Africa	All-rounder
Ashleigh Gardner	Australia	All-rounder
Fatima Sana	Pakistan	All-rounder
Sophie Molineux	Australia	Bowler / Captain
Shree Charani	India	Bowler
Darcey Carter	Scotland	12th player

== Broadcasting ==
The global broadcasters for the tournament were confirmed by the ICC on 6 June 2026. The matches were broadcast worldwide in 14 languages. The matches were also broadcast through ICC.tv and the ICC's official YouTube channel. JioHotstar provided a vertical live feed along with multi-camera features.

Broadcasters for the tournament
Region	Country/Sub-region	Broadcasting licensee(s)	Broadcasting platforms	Radio
Africa	Middle East and North Africa	Starz	StarzPlay	—N/a
Africa	Sub-Saharan Africa	SuperSport	SS Cricket & SuperSport	—N/a
Americas	Canada	Willow	Willow TV & Cricbuzz	—N/a
Americas	Caribbean Islands	ESPN	ESPN Caribbean & Disney+	—N/a
Americas	United States	Willow	Willow TV & Cricbuzz	—N/a
Asia	Bangladesh	TSM	Rabbithole & ICC.tv	—N/a
Asia	Hong Kong	PCCW	Cricbuzz & ICC.tv	—N/a
Asia	India	JioStar	Star Sports & JioHotstar	—N/a
Asia	Malaysia	Astro	Cricbuzz, Astro Go, Sooka & ICC.tv	—N/a
Asia	Pakistan	PTV & Myco	PTV Sports & Geo Super; Myco, Tamasha, ARY ZAP & Tapmad	—N/a
Asia	Pacific Islands	Digicel	Digicel	—N/a
Asia	Singapore	StarHub	Hub Sports 4 & StarHub app	—N/a
Asia	Sri Lanka	Dialog TV	Dialog Play, Peo TV, ThePapare, TV Supreme & Star Sports	—N/a
Europe	Ireland	Sky Sports	Sky Sports Cricket, Sky Sports Main Event, Sky Go & Sky Sports Mix	—N/a
Europe	Netherlands	NOS	NOS & ICC.tv	—N/a
Europe	United Kingdom	Sky Sports	Sky Sports Cricket, Sky Sports Main Event, Sky Go & Sky Sports Mix	BBC Radio
Oceania	Australia	Amazon	Prime Video	ABC Radio
Oceania	New Zealand	Sky TV NZ	Sky Sport, Sky Sport Now & Sky Go	—N/a
Rest of the world		International Cricket Council	ICC.tv & YouTube	ICC app

=== Commentators ===
The ICC released the following list of commentators for the tournament on 8 June 2026.

- Ian Bishop
- Carlos Brathwaite
- Anjum Chopra
- Charles Dagnall
- Simon Doull
- Tash Farrant
- Natalie Germanos
- Isa Guha
- Matthew Hayden
- Nasser Hussain
- Mel Jones
- Isobel Joyce
- Raunak Kapoor
- Dinesh Karthik
- Stacy-Ann King
- Veda Krishnamurthy
- Katey Martin
- Laura McGoldrick
- Sana Mir
- Alison Mitchell
- Kass Naidoo
- Julia Price
- Ebony Rainford-Brent
- Mithali Raj
- Jatin Sapru
- Ian Smith
- Alan Wilkins

=== Attendance & viewership ===
The six-match/three-day opening weekend had a total attendance of 44,844, surpassing the previous high of 34,680 for the 2025 Women's Cricket World Cup's opening weekend in India. The weekend also reported 134 million digital viewers on the JioHotstar platform in India. It became the most-watched ICC women's tournament opening on the UK's Sky network, with a peak of 510,000 concurrent viewers. The ICC's social content reached over 753 million views in the opening weekend as well. The match 6 between India and Pakistan was attended by 18,814 fans surpassing their 2024 encounter's attendance of 15,935 to become the most-attended group satge match; The record would be surpassed twice again in the tournament: match 28 attended by 21,018 and mathces 29 and 30 attended by 27,164. The final match grossed over £1 million (US$1.37 million) in ticket sales alone and was attended by 28,000 fans. The final match also had a peak of 678,000 concurrent viewers on the Sky network and 2.1 million views of the BBC's coverage. The tournament had a total attendance of 245,815 across 25 match days, more than three times that of the 2017 Women's Cricket World Cup in England. The tournament also became the most watched Women's T20 World Cup with a watch time of 15 million hours on the Sky network.

== See also ==
- International cricket in 2026
- Associate international cricket in 2026
- 2026 Men's T20 World Cup
- 2026 Men's T20 World Cup final
- 2026 Men's T20 World Cup qualification
- 2026 Men's T20 World Cup squads
- International cricket in 2025–26
- Associate international cricket in 2025–26
