= Danni Wyatt-Hodge =

English cricketer

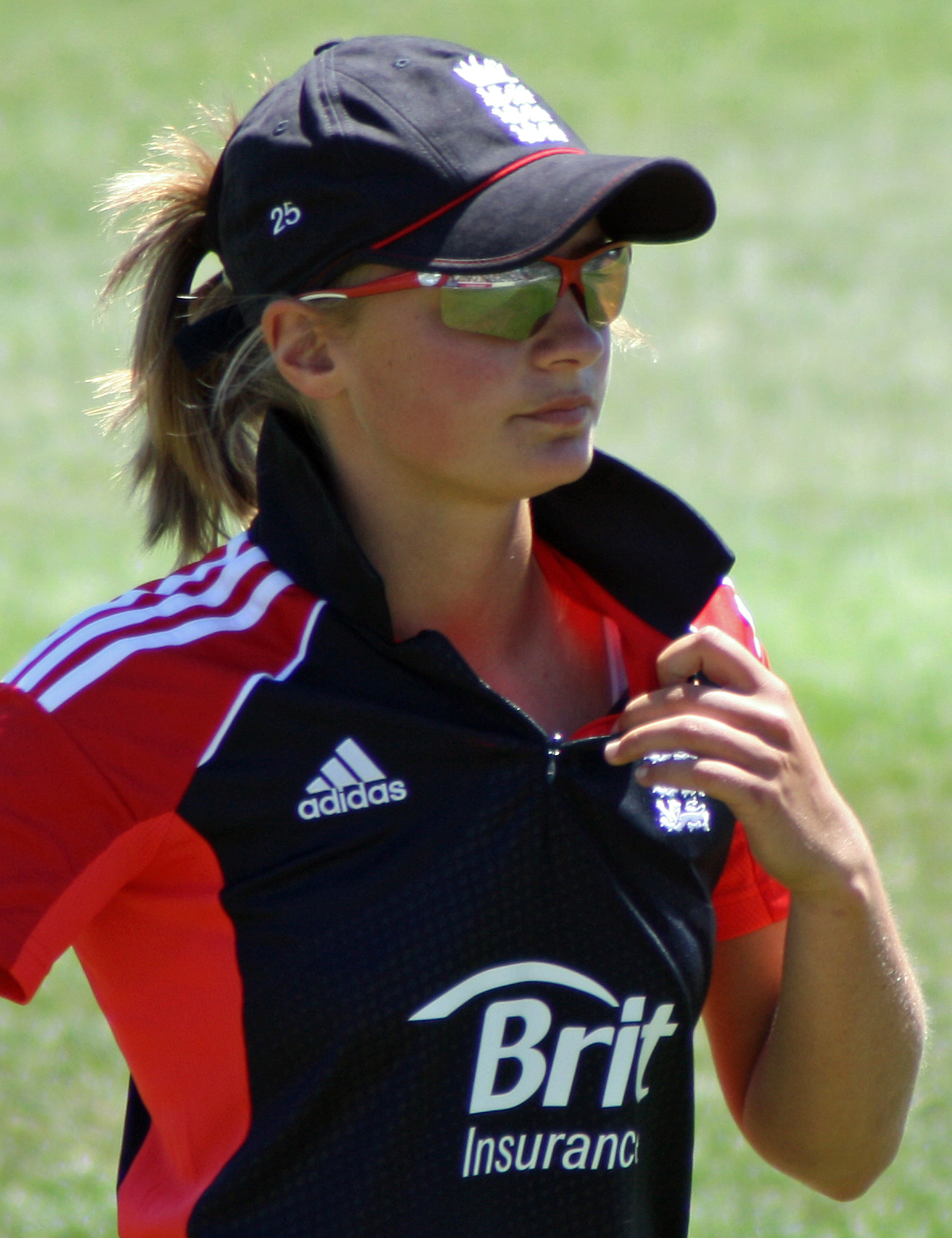

Personal information
- Full name: Danielle Nicole Wyatt-Hodge
- Born: 22 April 1991 (age 35); Stoke-on-Trent, Staffordshire, England
- Batting: Right-handed
- Bowling: Right-arm off break
- Role: Batting all-rounder

International information
- National side: England (2010–present)
- Test debut (cap 168): 22 June 2023 v Australia
- Last Test: 30 January 2025 v Australia
- ODI debut (cap 116): 1 March 2010 v India
- Last ODI: 29 October 2025 v South Africa
- ODI shirt no.: 28
- T20I debut (cap 25): 4 March 2010 v India
- Last T20I: 5 July 2026 v Australia
- T20I shirt no.: 28

Domestic team information
- Years: Team
- 2005–2012: Staffordshire
- 2011/12: Victoria
- 2013–2015: Nottinghamshire
- 2015/16: Victoria
- 2015/16–2019/20: Melbourne Renegades
- 2016–2025: Sussex
- 2016: Lancashire Thunder
- 2017–2024: Southern Vipers
- 2018: Supernovas
- 2019–2020: Velocity
- 2021–2025: Southern Brave
- 2022/23: Brisbane Heat
- 2025: Royal Challengers Bangalore
- 2025: Surrey
- 2026: Gujarat Giants
- 2026: MI London

Career statistics
Competition	WTest	WODI	WT20I	WLA
Matches	4	120	187	260
Runs scored	188	2,074	3,671	6,331
Batting average	23.50	23.56	24.47	30.43
100s/50s	0/1	2/5	3/23	11/24
Top score	54	129	124	129
Balls bowled	–	2,336	759	5,245
Wickets	–	27	46	152
Bowling average	–	28.51	15.54	20.45
5 wickets in innings	–	0	0	2
10 wickets in match	–	0	0	0
Best bowling	–	3/7	4/11	7/41
Catches/stumpings	1/–	29/–	44/–	80/–
Medal record
Women's cricket
Representing England
T20 World Cup
Runner-up	2026 England
- Source: CricketArchive, 31 July 2026

Danielle Nicole Wyatt-Hodge (née Wyatt; born 22 April 1991) is an English cricketer who plays for Surrey, Southern Brave, England and Gujarat Giants. She plays as an all-rounder, batting right-handed and bowling right-arm off break. She made her England debut against India in Mumbai on 1 March 2010.

== Early career ==
Wyatt-Hodge is a right-handed opening/middle order batter and off break bowler. She played for Staffordshire Ladies and Meir Heath Women in the Northern Premier League, having moved from Gunnersbury at the end of the 2012 season, as well as men's club cricket for her local club Whitmore.

In 2010, she was awarded an MCC Young Cricketers contract which enables her cricketing development via training at the MCC on a daily basis. She is the holder of one of the first tranche of 18 ECB central contracts for women players, which were announced in April 2014.

== Career ==
Wyatt was a member of the winning women's team at the 2017 Women's Cricket World Cup held in England.

In December 2017, she was named as one of the players in the ICC Women's T20I Team of the Year.

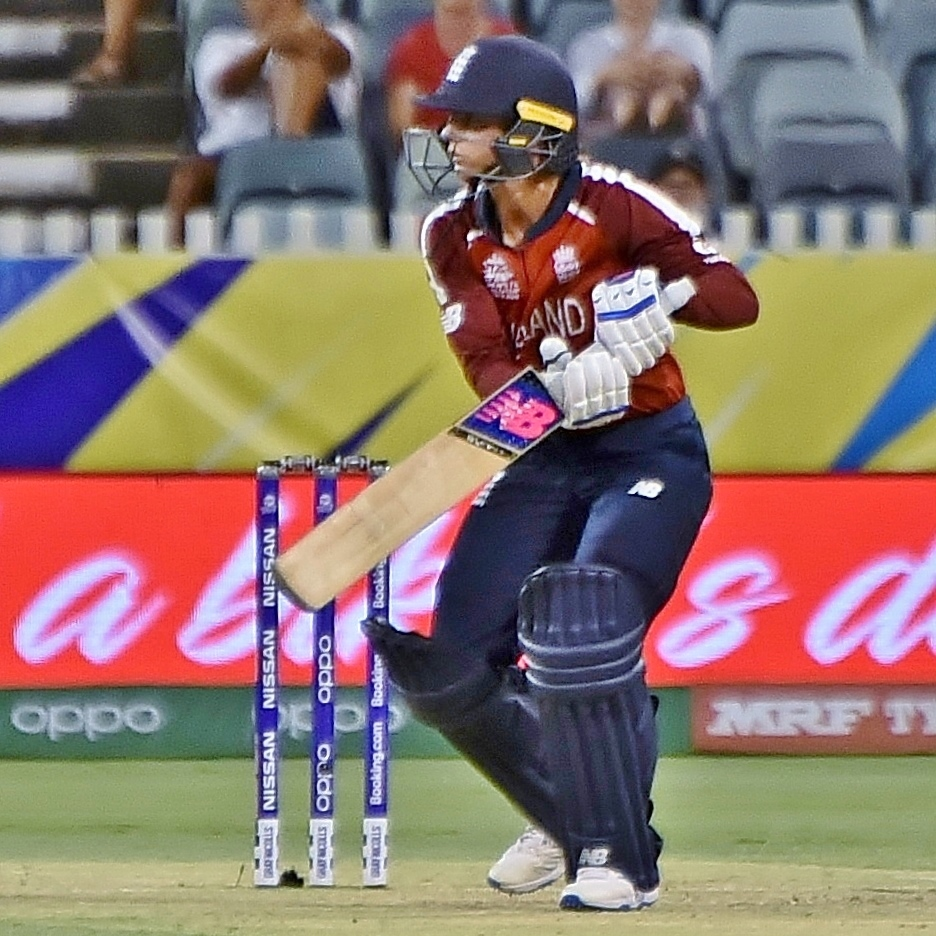
Wyatt batting for England during the 2020 ICC Women's T20 World Cup

In March 2018, during the 2018 Women's T20I Tri Nations Series in India; in a match against India, she scored her 2nd WT20I century in her career as her knock of 124 runs powered England to register the highest ever successful chase by any team in a WT20I match (199/3). With this century, she became the second female cricketer to score 2 centuries in WT20Is after Deandra Dottin and also registered the second highest individual score in a WT20I just behind Meg Lanning's 126. Her innings of 124 runs is also the highest individual score set by an opener in a WT20I match and she also recorded the second fastest century by a player in a WT20I innings (52 balls) just after Deandra Dottin's 38-ball century.

In October 2018, she was named in England's squad for the 2018 ICC Women's World Twenty20 tournament in the West Indies.

In November 2018, she was named in the Melbourne Renegades' squad for the 2018–19 Women's Big Bash League season. In February 2019, she was awarded a full central contract by the England and Wales Cricket Board (ECB) for 2019. In June 2019, the ECB named her in England's squad for their opening match against Australia to contest the Women's Ashes.

In December 2019, in England's opening match against Pakistan in Malaysia, Wyatt scored her first century in a WODI match. During the same tour, she also played her 100th WT20I match against Pakistan. In January 2020, she was named in England's squad for the 2020 ICC Women's T20 World Cup in Australia.

On 18 June 2020, Wyatt was named in a squad of 24 players to begin training ahead of international women's fixtures starting in England following the COVID-19 pandemic.

In February 2021, she went on England's tour of New Zealand, helping them complete a 2–1 WODI series win and a 3–0 WT20I series win. She was also drafted by Southern Brave for the inaugural season of The Hundred.

In December 2021, Wyatt was named in England's squad for their tour to Australia to contest the Women's Ashes. In February 2022, she was named in England's team for the 2022 Women's Cricket World Cup in New Zealand. In April 2022, she was bought by the Southern Brave for the 2022 season of The Hundred.

In July 2022, she was named in England's team for the cricket tournament at the 2022 Commonwealth Games in Birmingham, England.

In June 2023, Wyatt was again named in an England Test squad for the 2023 Women's Ashes series against Australia. She made her Test debut in that match, on 22 June 2023.

She was named in the England squad for the 2024 ICC Women's T20 World Cup.

On 30 October 2024, she was traded to Royal Challengers Bangalore from UP Warriorz to play for 2025 season WPL. She was picked up by the Warriorz for INR 30 lakhs at WPL 2024 auction but didn't feature for the UP franchise.

Wyatt-Hodge was named in England's squad for their multi-format tour to South Africa in November 2024.

She joined the newly professional Surrey Women's team ahead of the restructured domestic set-up for the 2025 season.

Wyatt-Hodge was named in the England squad for the 2025 Women's Ashes series in Australia.

== International centuries ==
One Day International centuries
Runs	Match	Opponents	City	Venue	Year
110	72	Pakistan	Kuala Lumpur, Malaysia	Kinrara Academy Oval	2019
129	92	South Africa	Christchurch, New Zealand	Hagley Oval	2022

T20 International centuries
Runs	Match	Opponents	City	Venue	Year
100	73	Australia	Canberra, Australia	Manuka Oval	2017
124	75	India	Mumbai, India	Brabourne Stadium	2018
105*	181	Sri Lanka	Birmingham, England	Edgbaston Cricket Ground	2026

== Personal life ==
Wyatt's nickname is "Waggy". In 2015, she explained to sports journalist Clare Balding that "The girls say I’m a wannabe WAG because I’ve dated two footballers!" She has supported Port Vale FC since she started attending matches at Vale Park with her grandfather at the age of eight. On 10 June 2024, Wyatt married Georgie Hodge, a football agent, at the Chelsea Old Town Hall in London. They had been dating since 2019 and became engaged in early 2023 in South Africa. Georgie gave birth on 20 May 2026 to the couple's first daughter.
