= Venues of the 2028 Summer Olympics and Paralympics =

The 2028 Summer Olympics are scheduled to be held in Los Angeles, California, United States, from July 14–30, 2028. The Games will be hosted in and around Greater Los Angeles and Los Angeles County. The 2028 Summer Paralympics will be held from August 15-27, 2028. The city's bid relied on a majority of existing venues and venues that had already been under construction or were planned regardless of the Games. The majority of venues are divided into clusters known as "sports parks", situated in Downtown Los Angeles, the San Fernando Valley, Carson (at California State University, Dominguez Hills), and Long Beach. Oklahoma City, Oklahoma will host the events for softball and canoe slalom. No new permanent venues are being built specifically for the Games.

The Los Angeles Memorial Coliseum and the Rose Bowl will host athletics and football (soccer), respectively. Both will become the first stadiums to have ever hosted three different Olympiads. BMO Stadium, which opened in 2018 as the home of Major League Soccer's Los Angeles FC, will host flag football and lacrosse. The University of California, Los Angeles will house the main Olympic Village (with a sub-village at the Oklahoma City University for canoe slalom and softball athletes), while USC will house the Olympic Media Village. Riviera Country Club will host golf.

The 2017 venue plan proposed holding the opening ceremonies at both SoFi Stadium and the historic Los Angeles Memorial Coliseum, in an acknowledgement of the Coliseum's role in the 1932 and 1984 Olympics. SoFi Stadium opened in 2020 as the home of the NFL's Los Angeles Rams and Los Angeles Chargers. It will host swimming, becoming the largest swimming venue in Olympic history. SoFi Stadium is expected to serve as the main ceremonies venue, and the Los Angeles Organizing Committee will incorporate the Los Angeles Memorial Coliseum into the opening ceremonies' protocol in a dual-venue format. The closing ceremony will be held at the Coliseum. LA28 confirmed the official ceremonies plan on May 8, 2025.

== Venues and infrastructure ==
The venues listed in this article were announced at various times leading up to the Games. The most recent update to the Olympic venue plan was submitted to the IOC on April 9, 2025, and publicly announced on April 15, 2025. The Paralympic venue plan was announced on June 3, 2025.

For the first time in Olympic and Paralympic history, venues will be permitted to carry naming rights. Existing venues that already bear the names of partners in the Worldwide Olympic and Paralympic Partner (TOP) or Founding Partner tiers may retain those names, while venues sponsored companies not affiliated with the Olympics will be referred to by a generic alternate name under the IOC's standard policy. Temporary venues can also display the names of sponsors. Announced alternate venue names are provided in parentheses.

Location of the facilities in the Los Angeles area

=== Carson Zone ===
The Carson Zone will be located on the campus of California State University, Dominguez Hills in Carson, California.

Venue		Olympic Events	Paralympic Events	Capacity	Status
Dignity Health Sports Park (Carson Sports Park)	Main Stadium (Carson Stadium)	Rugby sevens	—N/a	27,000	Existing
Dignity Health Sports Park (Carson Sports Park)	Main Stadium (Carson Stadium)	Archery	—N/a	TBA	Existing
Dignity Health Sports Park (Carson Sports Park)	Tennis Stadium (Carson Courts)	Tennis	Wheelchair tennis	8,000 (center court)	Existing
Dignity Health Sports Park (Carson Sports Park)	Velo Sports Center (Carson Velodrome)	Track cycling	Track cycling	2,450	Existing
Dignity Health Sports Park (Carson Sports Park)	Track and Field Facility (Carson Field)	Field hockey	Archery	15,000 (primary field); 5,000 (secondary field)	Temporary

=== DTLA Zone ===
Various venues in Downtown Los Angeles, including the L.A. Live complex will be utilized during the Games.

Venue	Olympic Events	Paralympic Events	Capacity	Status
Crypto.com Arena (DTLA Arena)	Boxing (finals)	Wheelchair basketball	18,145	Existing
Crypto.com Arena (DTLA Arena)	Gymnastics (artistic and trampolining)	Wheelchair basketball	18,145	Existing
Dodger Stadium	Baseball	—N/a	56,000	Existing
Grand Park	Athletics (race walking)	—N/a	5,000	Temporary
Los Angeles Convention Center (Note: Use of this venue is contingent on completion of a $2.6 billion expansion plan approved by the Los Angeles City Council on September 19, 2025.)	Fencing	Wheelchair fencing	7,000	Existing with temporary stands
Los Angeles Convention Center	Taekwondo	Taekwondo	7,000	Existing with temporary stands
Los Angeles Convention Center	Judo	Judo	TBA	Existing with temporary stands
Los Angeles Convention Center	Wrestling	Boccia	TBA	Existing with temporary stands
Los Angeles Convention Center	Table tennis	Table tennis	5,000	Existing with temporary stands
Peacock Theater	Boxing (preliminaries)	Goalball	7,100	Existing
Peacock Theater	Weightlifting	Para Powerlifting	7,100	Existing

=== Exposition Park Zone ===
Various venues in and around Exposition Park and University of Southern California (USC) campus will host an array of different competitions.

Venue	Olympic Events	Paralympic Events	Capacity	Status
BMO Stadium (Exposition Park Stadium)	Flag football	—N/a	22,000	Existing
BMO Stadium (Exposition Park Stadium)	Lacrosse	—N/a	22,000	Existing
Galen Center	Badminton	Badminton	10,258	Existing
Galen Center	Gymnastics (rhythmic)	Wheelchair rugby	10,258	Existing
Los Angeles Memorial Coliseum	Athletics (track and field)	Athletics (track and field, marathon (finish))	60,000	Existing
Los Angeles Memorial Coliseum	Opening/closing ceremonies	Closing ceremony	60,000	Existing

=== Inglewood Zone ===
The Inglewood Zone will be located in the Hollywood Park area of Inglewood, California.

Venue	Olympic Events	Paralympic Events	Capacity	Status
SoFi Stadium (2028 Stadium)	Opening ceremony		70,240	Existing
SoFi Stadium (2028 Stadium)	Swimming	—N/a	38,000	Existing with temporary stands
Intuit Dome	Basketball	—N/a	18,300	Existing
NFL Los Angeles at Hollywood Park	Main Press Center		—N/a	Existing

=== Long Beach Zone ===
The Long Beach Zone will host events along the Long Beach waterfront.

Venue	Olympic Events	Paralympic Events	Capacity	Status
Long Beach Waterfront	Coastal rowing	—N/a	TBA	Temporary
Long Beach Waterfront	Marathon swimming	—N/a	TBA	Temporary
Long Beach Convention Center (Long Beach Target Shooting Hall)	Shooting (target)	Shooting	TBA	Temporary
Long Beach Convention Center Lot (Long Beach Aquatics Center & Climbing Theater)	Artistic swimming	Swimming	TBA	Temporary
Long Beach Convention Center Lot (Long Beach Aquatics Center & Climbing Theater)	Water polo	Swimming	TBA	Temporary
Long Beach Convention Center Lot (Long Beach Aquatics Center & Climbing Theater)	Sport climbing	Paraclimbing	TBA	Temporary
Long Beach Arena	Handball	Sitting volleyball	14,000	Existing
Alamitos Beach (Allianz Beach Arena) (Note: This competition was originally scheduled for Santa Monica State Beach.)	Beach volleyball	Blind football	11,800	Temporary
Belmont Veterans Memorial Pier	Sailing (kiteboarding, windfoiling)	—N/a	6,000	Existing with temporary stands
Port of Los Angeles	Sailing (dinghy, multihull, skiff) (Note: These events were originally scheduled for Belmont Veterans Memorial Pier.)	—N/a	TBA	Existing with temporary stands
Long Beach Marine Stadium	Rowing	Rowing	14,000	Existing with temporary stands
Long Beach Marine Stadium	Canoeing (sprint)	Paracanoe	14,000	Existing with temporary stands

=== Valley Zone ===
The Valley Zone will host events at temporary venues in the Sepulveda Basin Recreation Center in the San Fernando Valley.

Venue	Olympic Events	Paralympic Events	Capacity	Status
Sepulveda Basin; Recreation Area	Basketball (3x3)	—N/a	TBA	Temporary
Sepulveda Basin; Recreation Area	BMX	—N/a	TBA	Temporary
Sepulveda Basin; Recreation Area	BMX	—N/a	TBA	Temporary
Sepulveda Basin; Recreation Area	Modern pentathlon	—N/a	TBA	Temporary
Sepulveda Basin; Recreation Area	Skateboarding	—N/a	TBA	Temporary

=== Other Southern California venues ===
Various venues in the Greater Los Angeles area. Each location is deemed a zone in itself by LA28 organizers, Venice Beach Zone, Pasadena Zone, Anaheim Zone, etc. as examples.

Venue	Location	Olympic Events	Paralympic Events	Capacity	Status
Knight Riders Cricket Ground (Fairgrounds Cricket Stadium)	Pomona	Cricket	—N/a	15,000	Existing, expanded
Griffith Observatory	Griffith Park (Los Angeles)	Road cycling (road race and time trial finish)	—N/a	TBD	Temporary
Los Angeles Zoo	Griffith Park (Los Angeles)	Road cycling (road race and time trial finish)	Road cycling (road race, time trial and mixed team relay start/finish)	TBD	Temporary
Honda Center	Anaheim	Volleyball	—N/a	18,609	Existing
Industry Hills Mountain Bike Course (Note: Before this location was selected, Frank G. Bonelli Regional Park and Santa Monica Mountains National Recreation Area were considered.)	City of Industry	Mountain biking	—N/a	TBA	Temporary
LA Clays Shooting Sports Park (Whittier Narrows Clay Shooting Center)	South El Monte	Shooting (shotgun)	—N/a	TBA	Existing
Riviera Country Club	Pacific Palisades (Los Angeles)	Golf	—N/a	30,000	Existing
Rose Bowl	Pasadena	Football (soccer) (preliminaries and finals)	—N/a	89,702	Existing
Rose Bowl Aquatics Center (Note: This competition was originally scheduled for LA84 Foundation/John C. Argue Swim Stadium.)	Pasadena	Diving	—N/a	5,000	Existing with temporary stands
Santa Anita Park (Note: This competition was originally scheduled for Galway Downs in Temecula.)	Arcadia	Equestrian	Equestrian	TBA	Existing with temporary stands
Trestles	San Clemente	Surfing	—N/a	TBA	Temporary
UCLA student housing	Westwood (Los Angeles)	Olympic Village & Training Center		14,500	Existing
Universal Studios Lot (Comcast Squash Center at Universal Studios)	Universal City (Los Angeles)	Squash	—N/a	TBA	Existing with temporary stands
Venice Beach (Los Angeles)		Athletics (marathon start)	Athletics (marathon start)	TBA	Temporary
Venice Beach (Los Angeles)		Road cycling (start)	—N/a	TBA	Temporary
Venice Beach (Los Angeles)		Triathlon	Paratriathlon	TBA	Temporary
Warner Bros. Ranch	Burbank	International Broadcast Centre	—N/a	—N/a	Existing

=== OKC Zone ===
On June 21, 2024, the LAOCOG announced that existing venues in Oklahoma City, Oklahoma would host the canoe slalom and softball events, opting not to build temporary venues for the events in Los Angeles to reduce costs.

Venue	Location	Olympic Events	Paralympic Events	Capacity	Status
Devon Park (OKC Softball Park)	Oklahoma City	Softball	—N/a	13,000	Existing
Riversport OKC (OKC Whitewater Center)	Oklahoma City	Canoeing (slalom)	—N/a	8,000	Existing with temporary stands
Oklahoma City University	Oklahoma City	Satellite Village	—N/a	TBA	Existing

=== Preliminary football (soccer) venues ===
Preliminary soccer venues were originally planned to be within the Greater Los Angeles area and other California cities. However, in April 2025, it was confirmed that all preliminary soccer matches would be held outside Los Angeles. The seven selected stadiums were announced on February 3, 2026. The match schedule, which will be unveiled before April 2026, will allow the competition to progressively move east to west as teams advance to the final stages, minimizing travel demands.

Venue	Location	Olympic Events	Paralympic Events	Capacity	Status
Etihad Park (New York Stadium)	New York City, New York	Football (soccer) (preliminaries)	—N/a	25,000	Existing
ScottsMiracle-Gro Field (Columbus Stadium)	Columbus, Ohio	Football (soccer) (preliminaries)	—N/a	20,371	Existing
Geodis Park (Nashville Stadium)	Nashville, Tennessee	Football (soccer) (preliminaries)	—N/a	30,109	Existing
Energizer Park (St. Louis Stadium)	St. Louis, Missouri	Football (soccer) (preliminaries)	—N/a	22,423	Existing
PayPal Park (San José Stadium)	San Jose, California	Football (soccer) (preliminaries)	—N/a	18,000	Existing
Snapdragon Stadium (San Diego Stadium)	San Diego, California	Football (soccer) (preliminaries)	—N/a	35,000	Existing

Location of the host stadiums of football tournament at the 2028 Summer Olympics.

== Gallery of venues ==
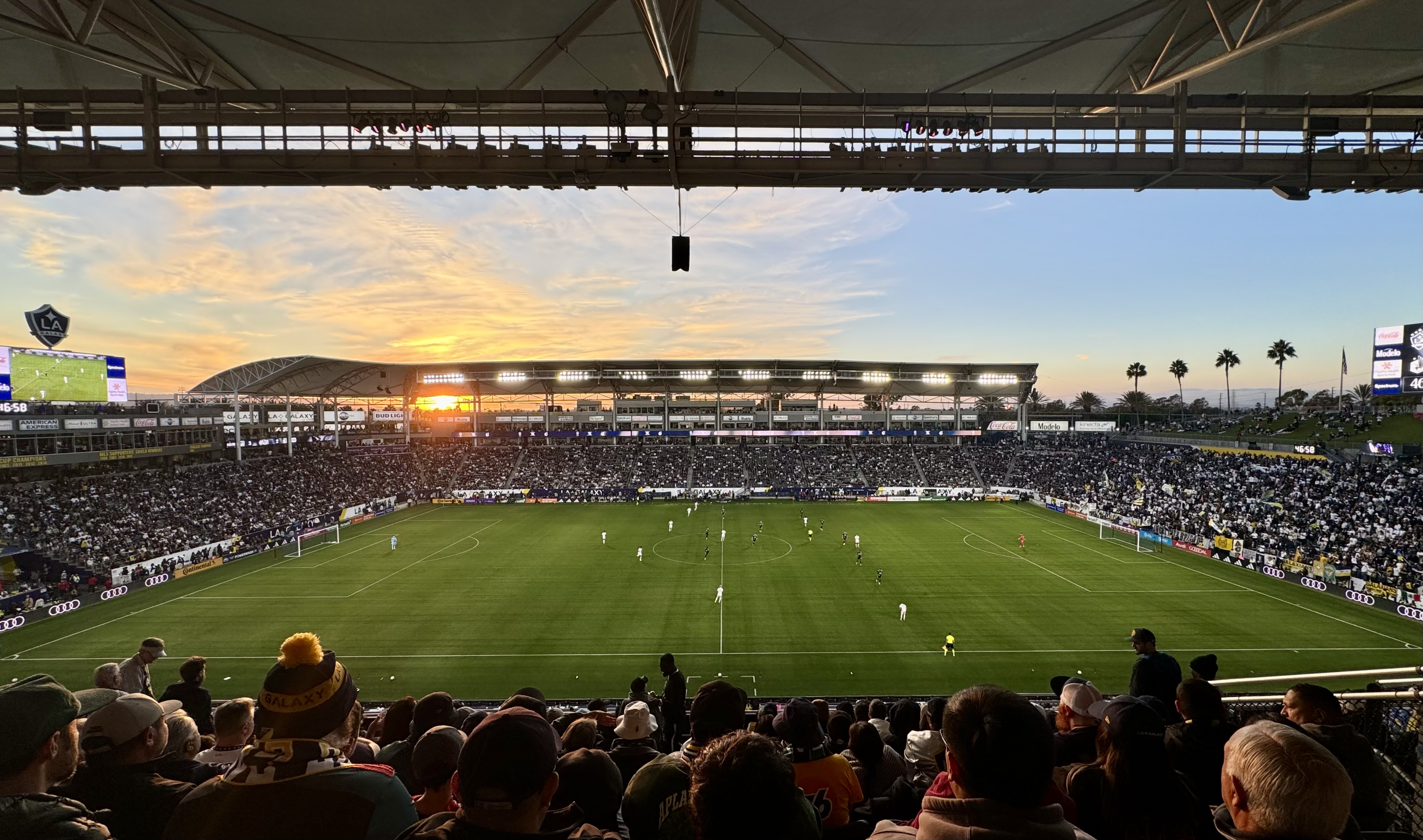
Dignity Health Sports Park Center in the Carson Zone

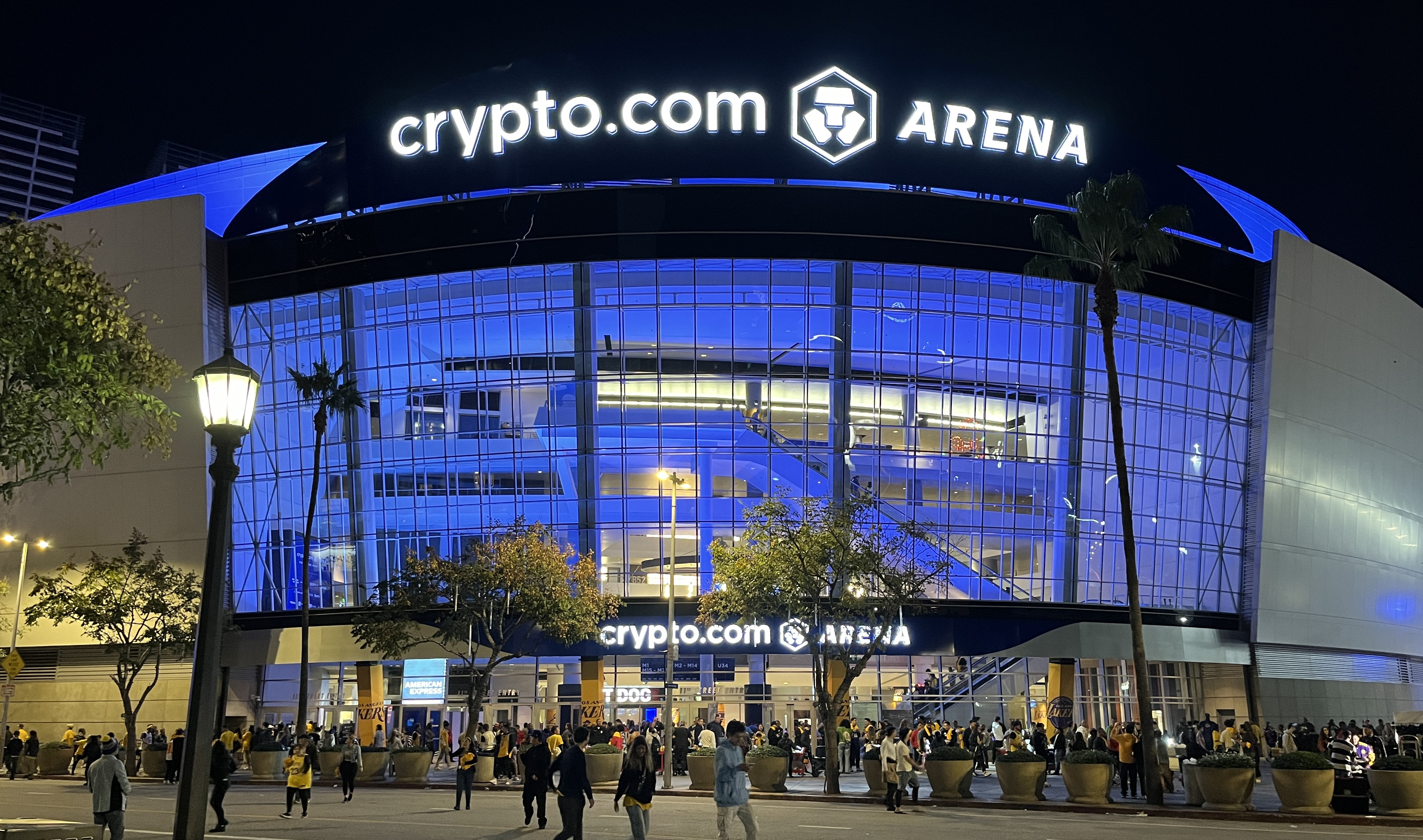
The Crypto.com Arena in the DTLA Zone

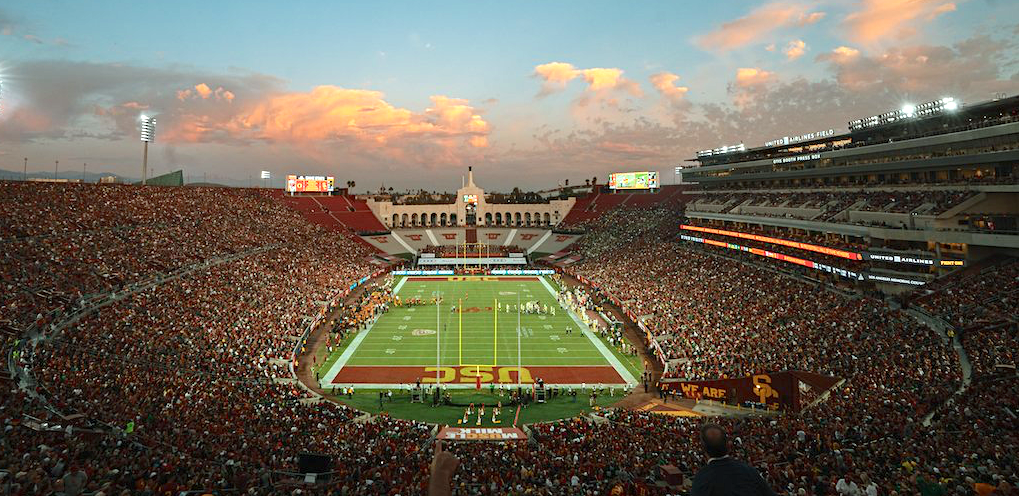
The Los Angeles Memorial Coliseum in the Exposition Park Zone

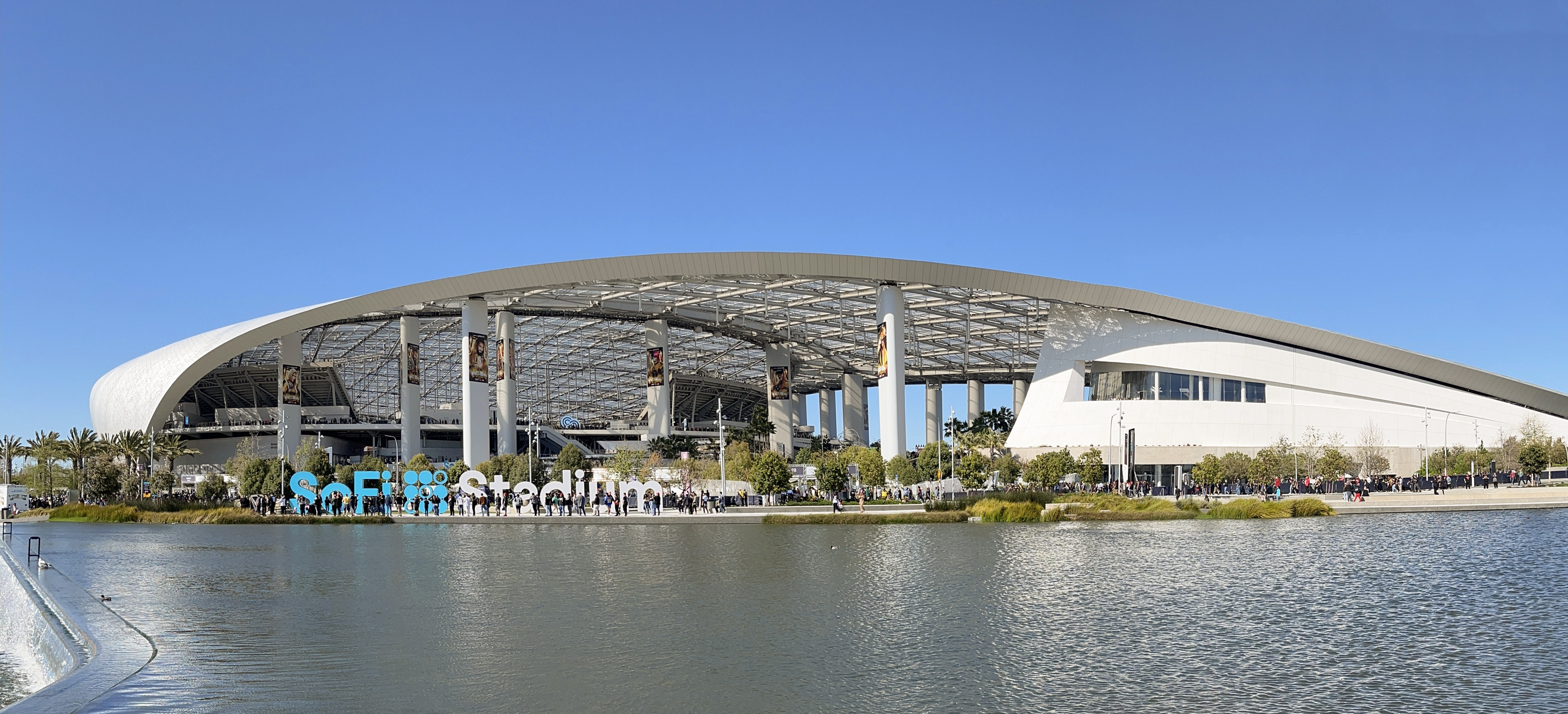
SoFi Stadium (2028 Stadium) in the Inglewood Zone

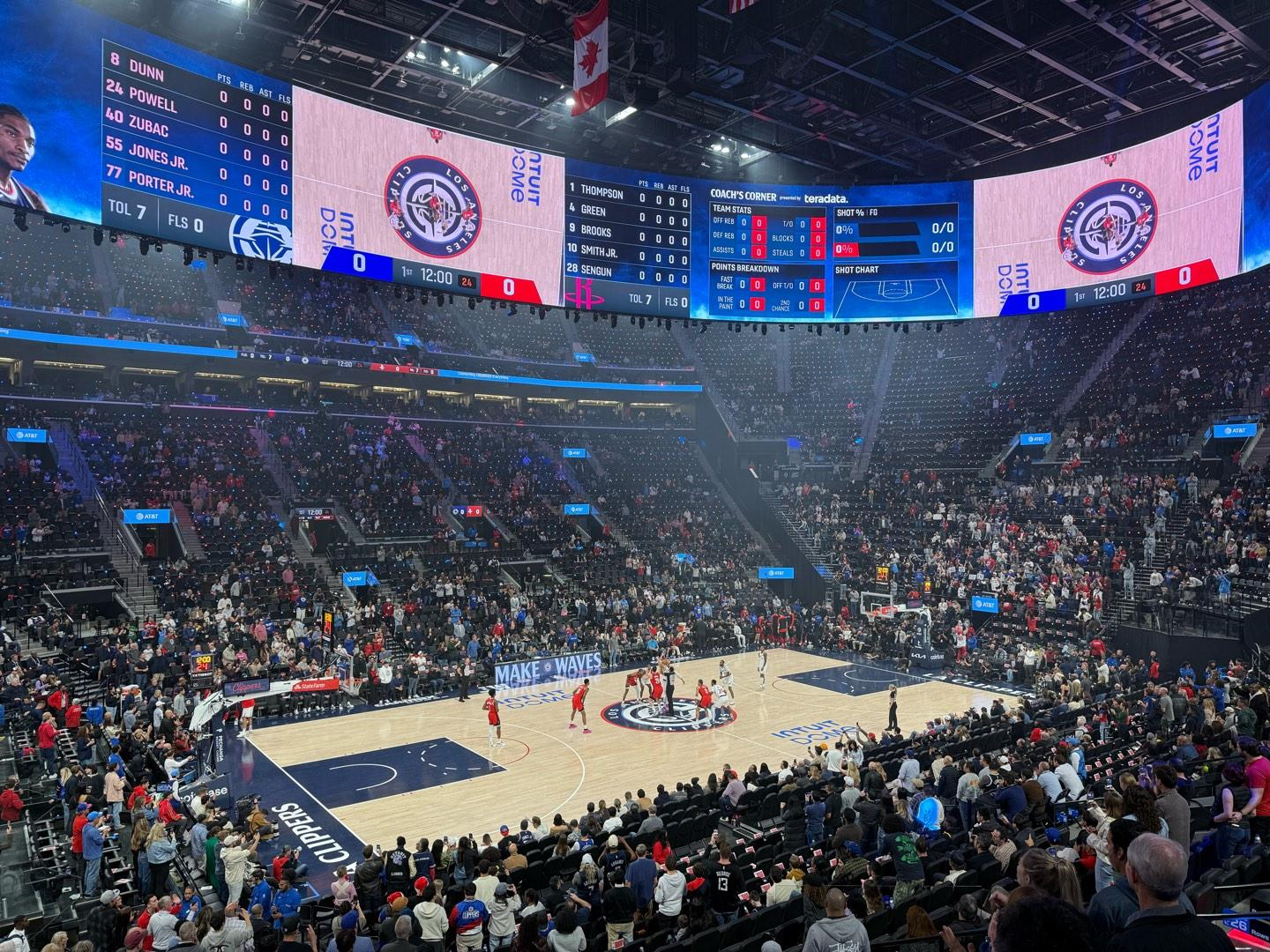
Intuit Dome in the Inglewood Zone

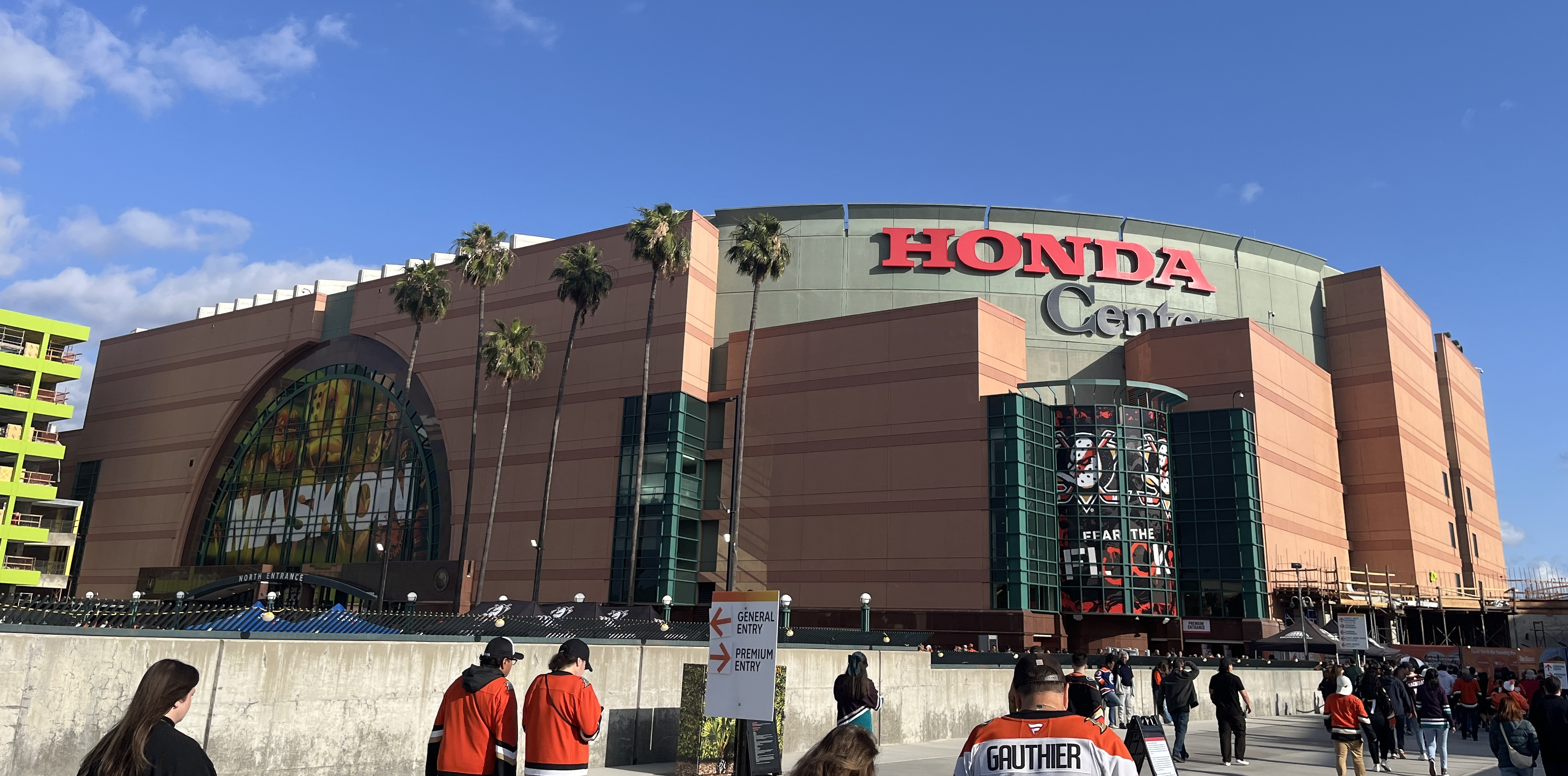
Honda Center in the Anaheim Zone

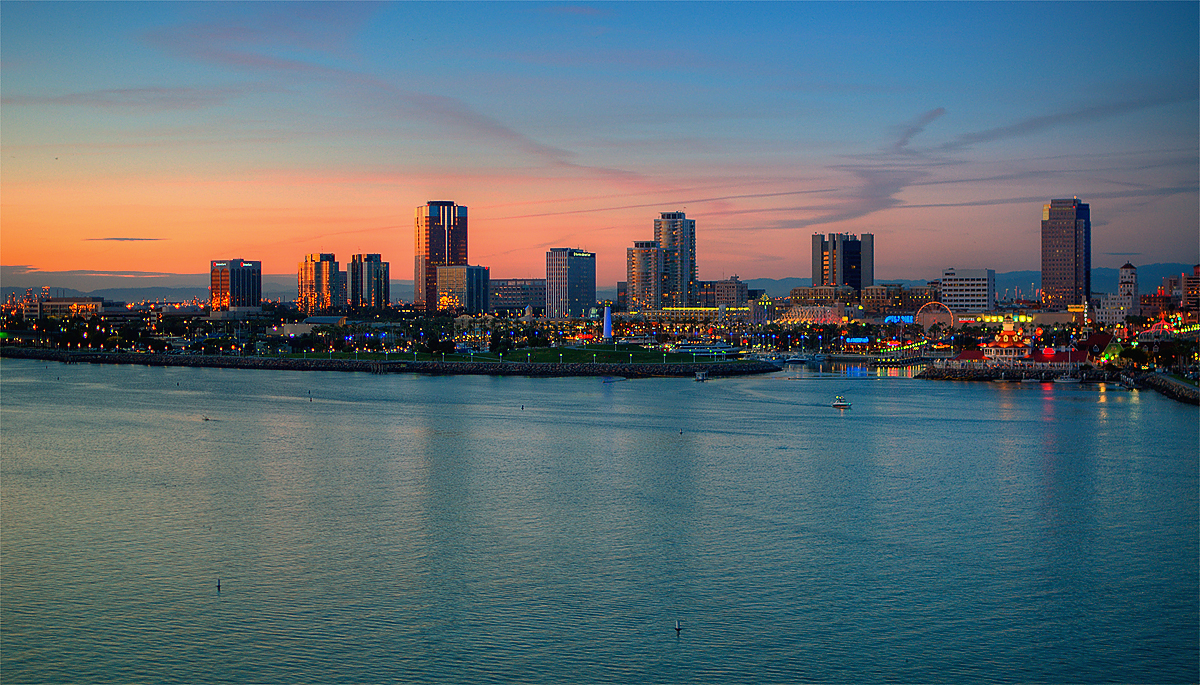
Long Beach Zone

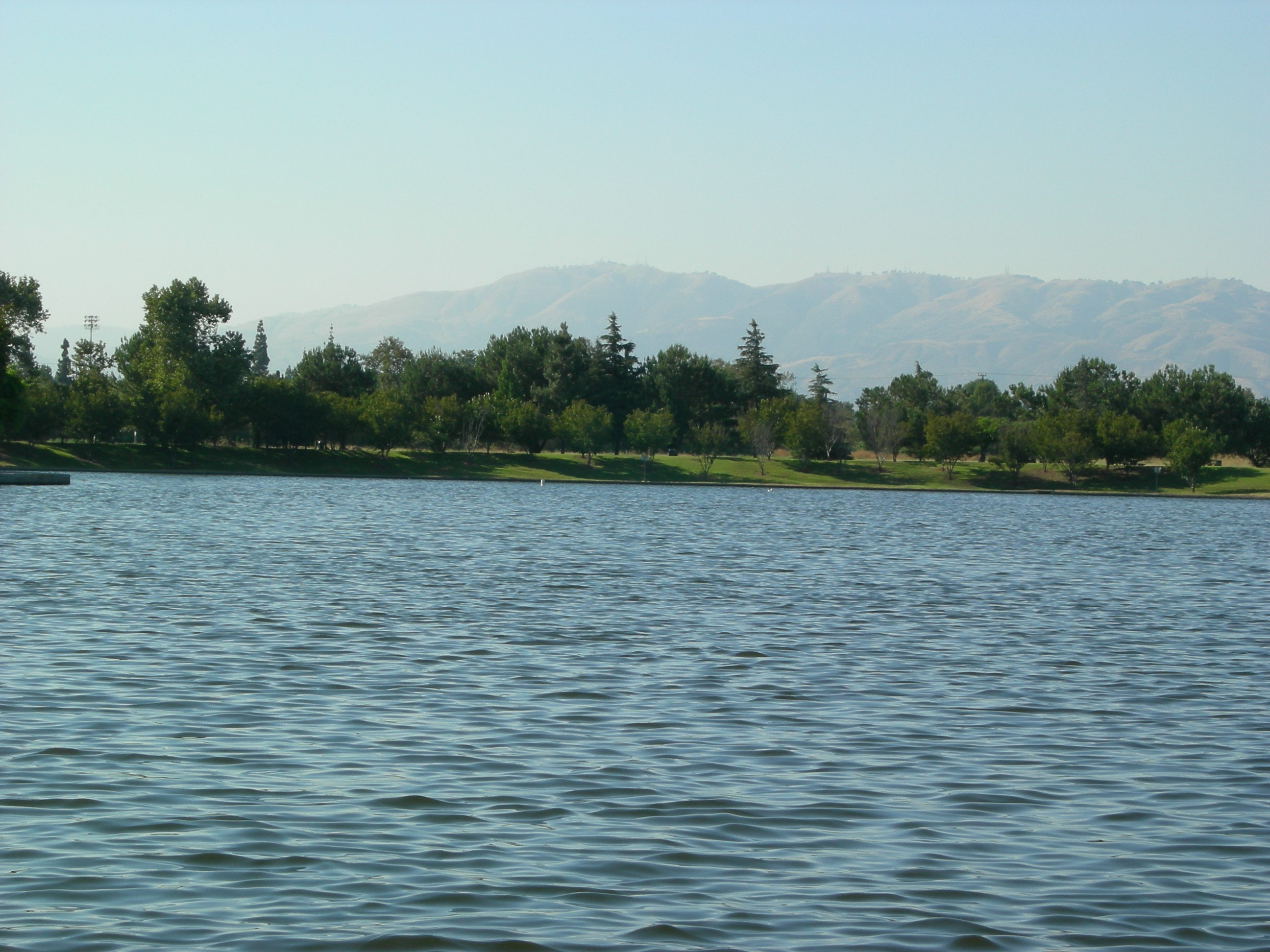
Sepulveda Basin Recreation Center in the Valley Zone

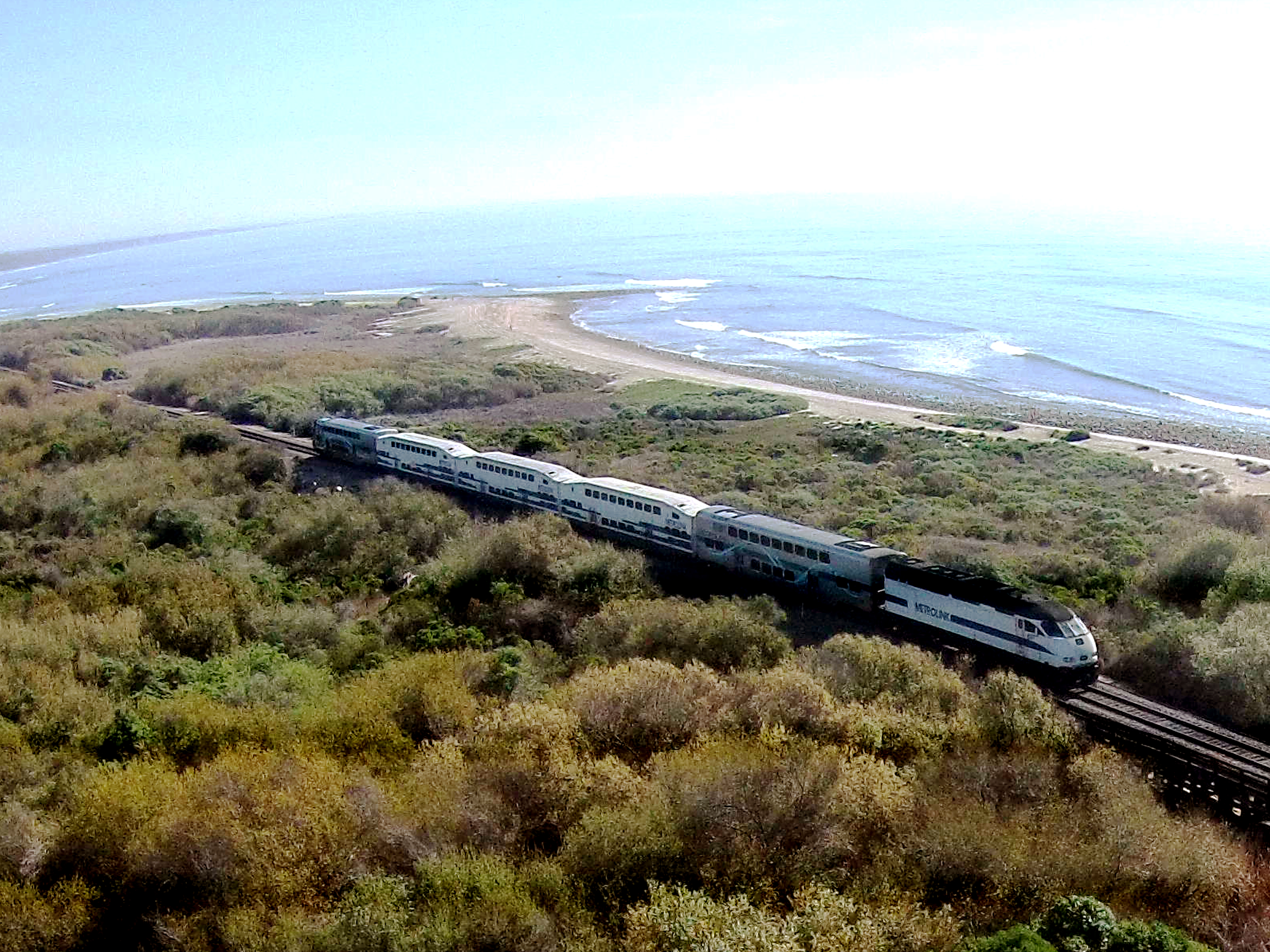
Trestles Beach

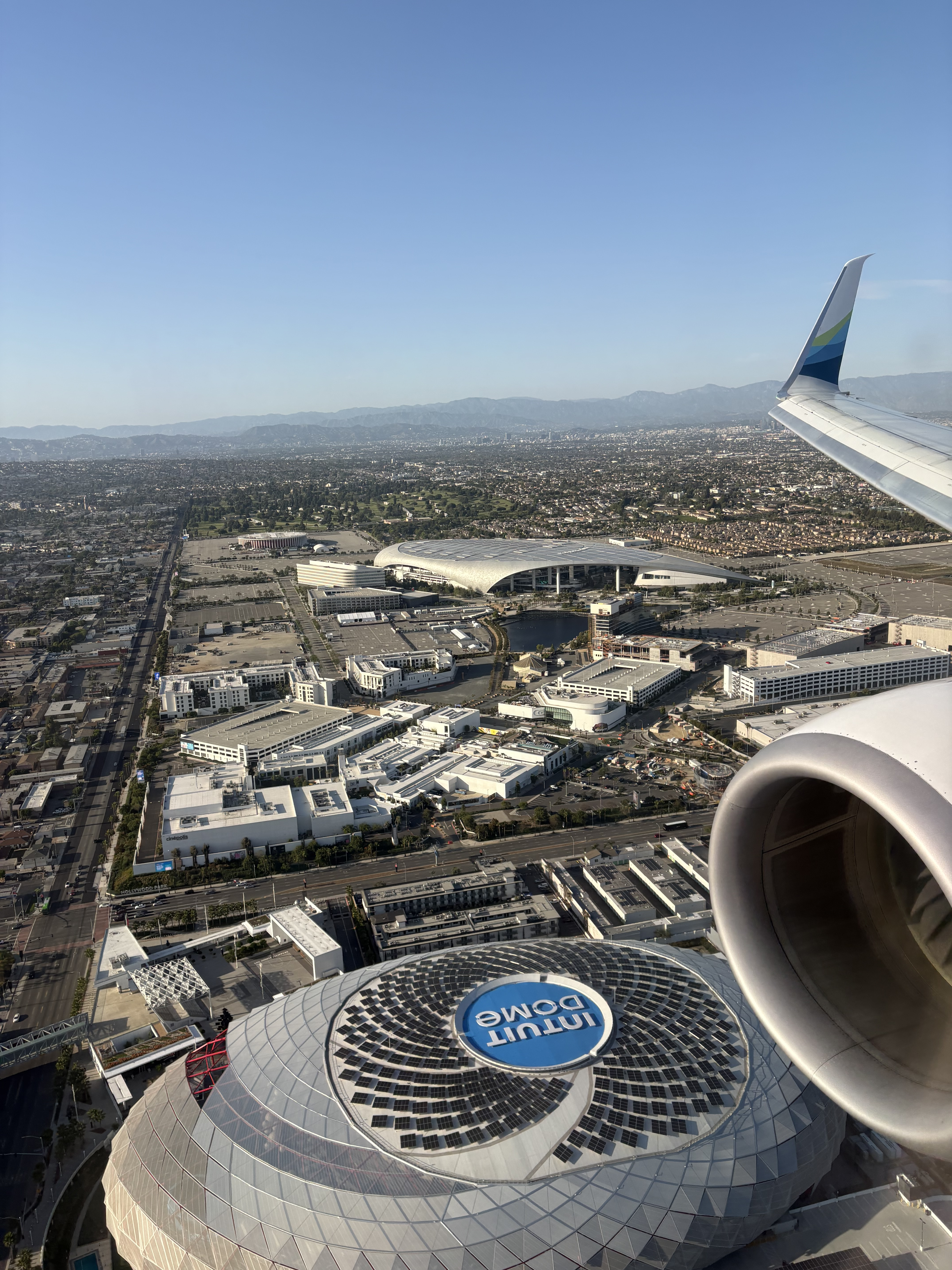
A view of the Inglewood Zone from a plane flying into LAX

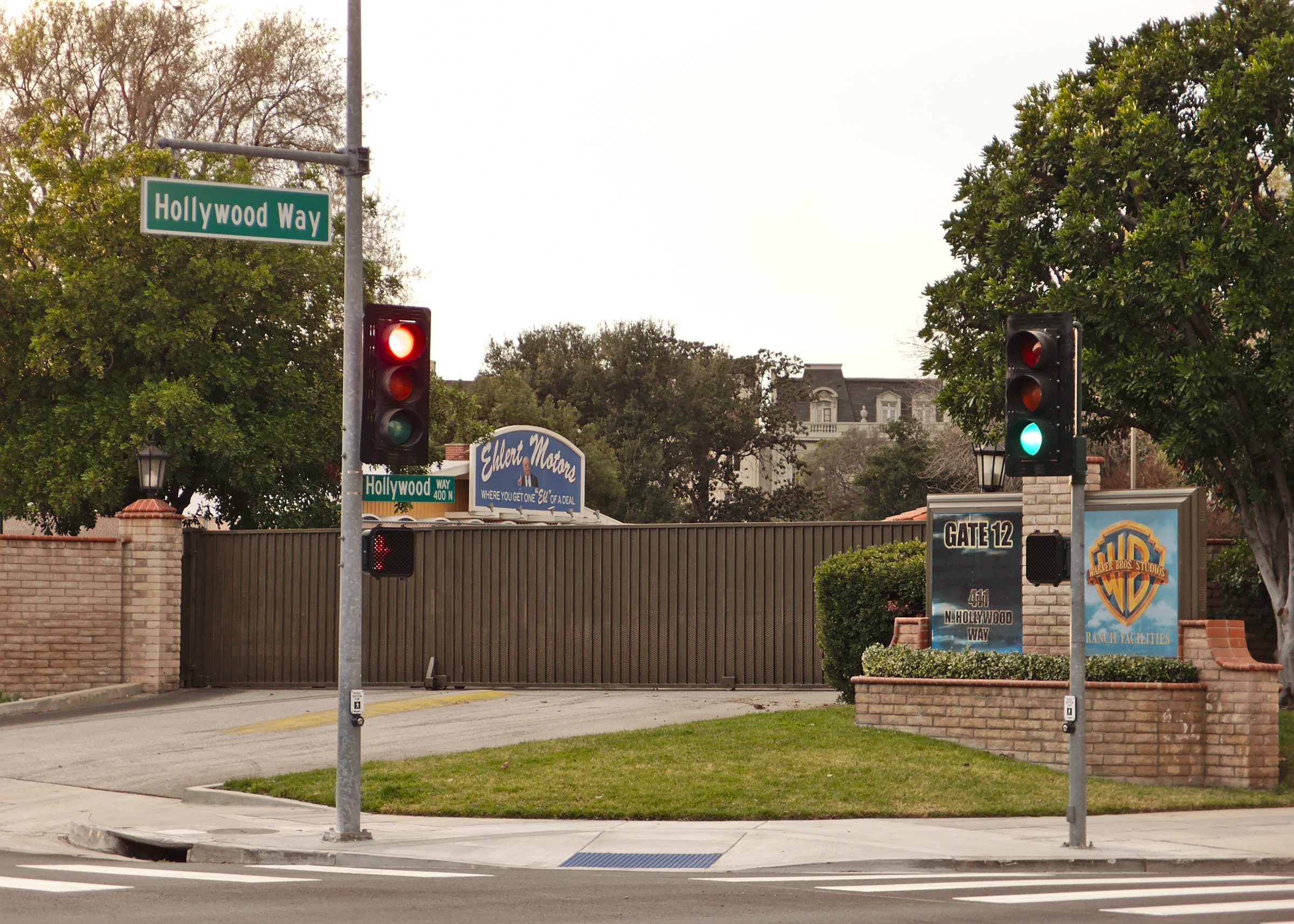
Warner Bros. Ranch will serve as the International Broadcast Centre

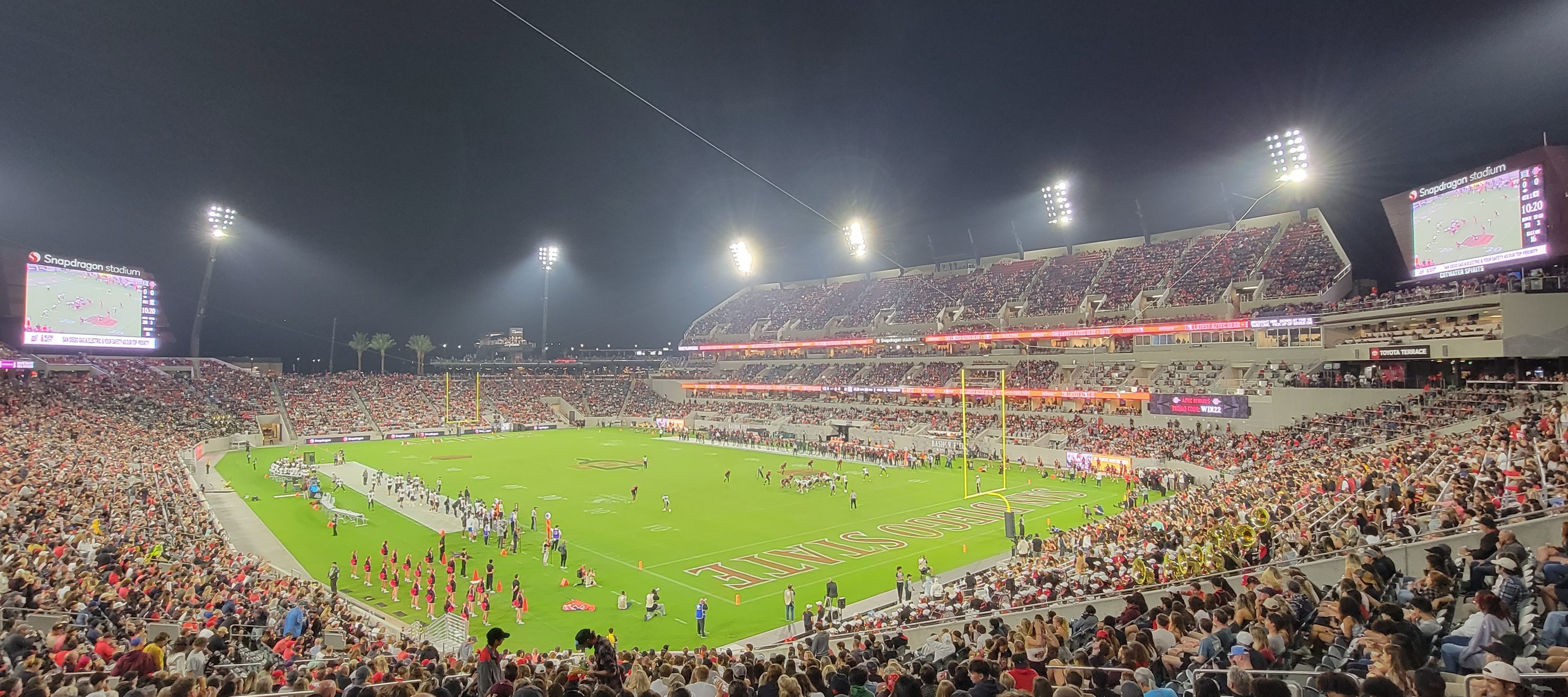
Snapdragon Stadium in San Diego will host football (soccer).

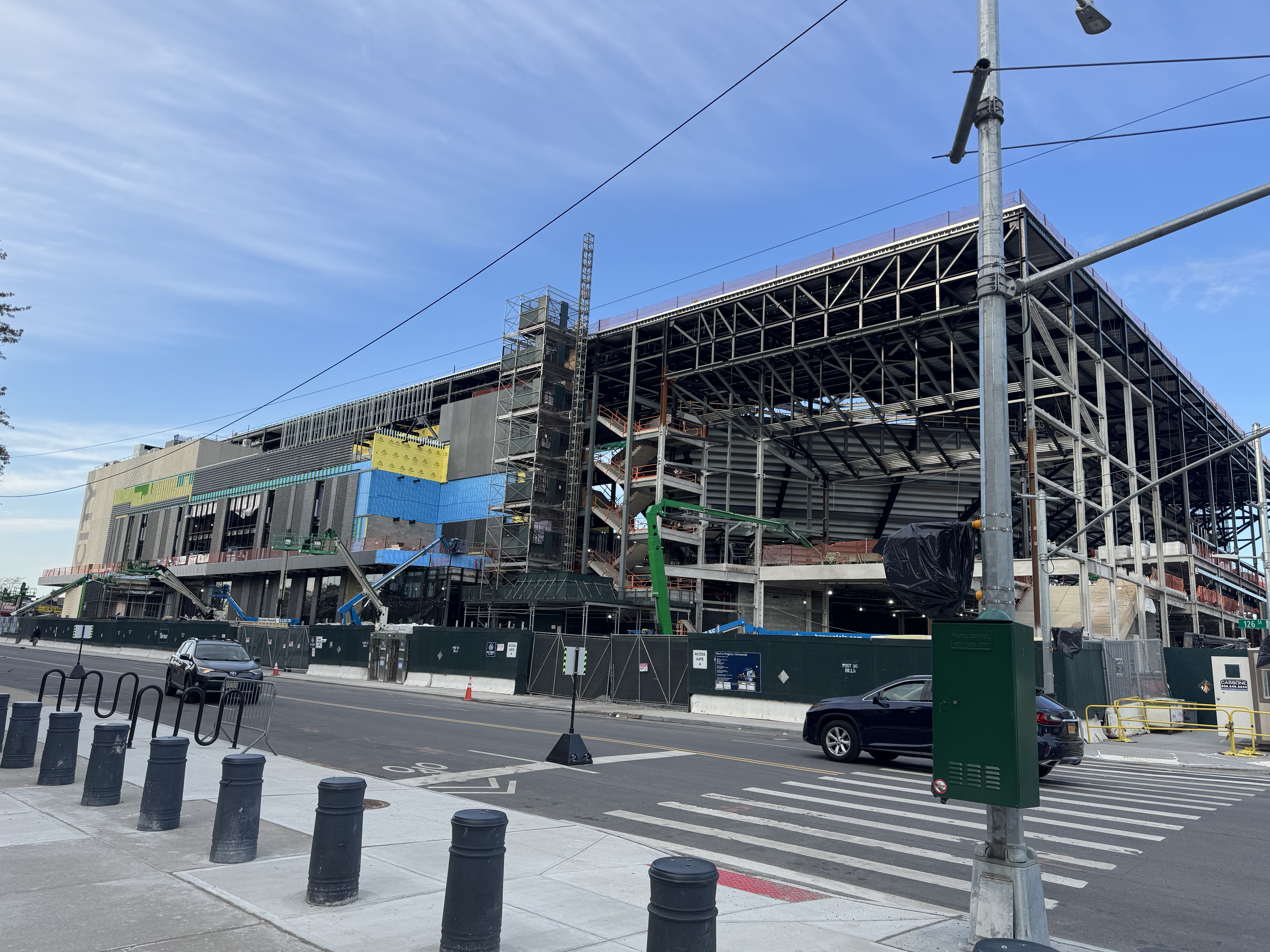
Etihad Park in New York City will host football (soccer) preliminaries.

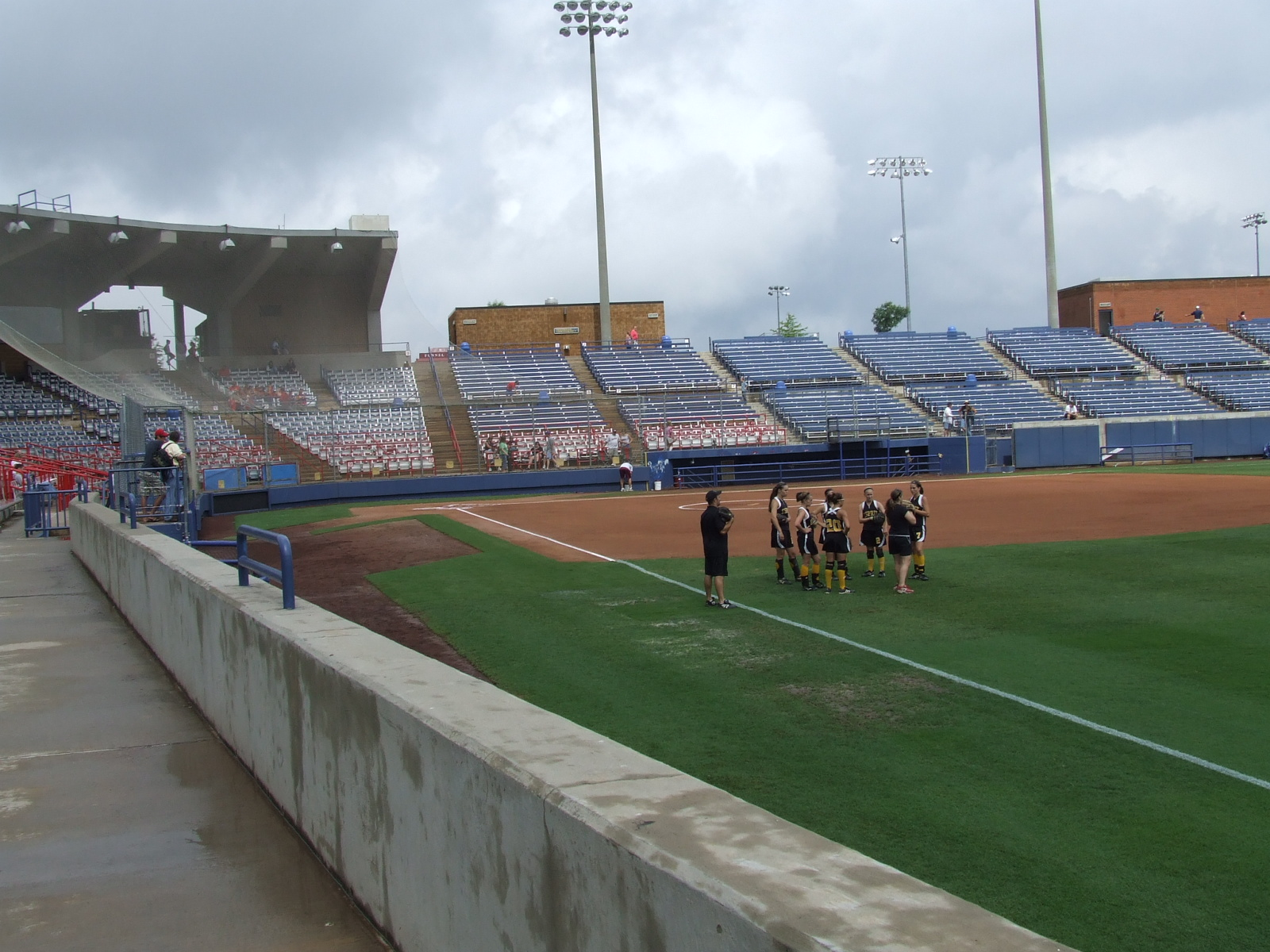
Devon Park in Oklahoma City will host softball.
