= 2028 Summer Paralympics =

Upcoming multi-parasport event in Los Angeles, California, US

XVIII Paralympic Games
- One of the many variations of the logo
- Location: Los Angeles, United States
- Motto: Stars Align
- Athletes: 4,400 (expected)
- Events: 560 in 23 sports
- Opening: August 15, 2028
- Closing: August 27, 2028
- Stadium: SoFi Stadium (Note: Named "2028 Stadium" during the Games.) (Opening ceremony); Los Angeles Memorial Coliseum (Closing ceremony)

The 2028 Summer Paralympics, also known as the Los Angeles 2028 Summer Paralympic Games, and branded as LA28, will be the 18th edition of the Summer Paralympic Games, an international multi-sport parasports event governed by the International Paralympic Committee. The Games are scheduled to take place from August 15 to August 27, 2028, in Los Angeles, California, United States.

Marking Los Angeles' first time as the host of the Paralympics, the Games will be the first Summer Paralympics in the United States since the 1996 edition in Atlanta, Georgia, and the third overall. The Games will include the debut of paraclimbing as an event.

== Bids ==
As part of a formal agreement between the International Paralympic Committee and the International Olympic Committee first established in 2001, the winner of the bid for the Summer Olympics also holds the Summer Paralympics.

In response to concerns over a number of cities withdrawing in the bid process of the 2022 Winter Olympics and 2024 Summer Olympics, a process to award the 2024 and 2028 Games simultaneously to the final two cities in the running to the 2024 Summer Olympics—Los Angeles and Paris—was approved at an Extraordinary IOC Session on July 11, 2017, in Lausanne. Paris was understood to be the preferred host for the 2024 Games. On July 31, 2017, the IOC announced Los Angeles as the sole candidate for the 2028 Games, leaving Paris to be confirmed as hosts for the 2024 Games. Both decisions were ratified at the 131st IOC Session on September 13, 2017.

== Development and preparations ==
=== Venues ===
The Paralympic venue plan was announced on June 3, 2025, using most of the same venues as the Olympics. The opening ceremony will take place at SoFi Stadium (named "2028 Stadium" during the Games), while the closing ceremony will take place at the Los Angeles Memorial Coliseum.

Unlike the Olympics, SoFi Stadium will not be used for swimming, as it will be needed by the Los Angeles Chargers and Rams for their NFL preseason games; swimming will take place at a temporary stadium on the grounds of the Long Beach Convention and Entertainment Center (which will host artistic swimming and water polo during the Olympics) instead. Some Paralympic athletes expressed disappointment at the decision, believing that it created an inequity between the Olympics and Paralympics.

== The Games ==
=== Sports ===
The program for the 2028 Summer Paralympics will feature a record 560 events in 23 sports—an increase of 11 events and one sport over 2024. It will feature the 22 sports contested in 2024, as well as the Paralympic debut of sport climbing (paraclimbing). IPC president Andrew Parsons stated that LA28 would be the most gender-balanced Paralympics in its history; there will be an increase of 12 women's events (a record 247) and three mixed/open events over 2024, and a decrease of four men's events. With these changes, a record 17 sports will have full gender parity, an increase of six over 2024.

A record 33 sports applied for consideration by the IPC, including bids to reinstate CP football (formerly football 7-a-side) and sailing, and bids for arm wrestling, beach paravolley, paraclimbing, para dance sport, golf, karate, powerchair football, para surfing, and wheelchair handball as new sports. The IPC shortlisted paraclimbing and para surfing for consideration by the LA28 organizing committee, with paraclimbing being selected as the 23rd sport in June 2024.

- Archery (9)
- Athletics (164)
- Badminton (16)
- Blind football (1)
- Boccia (11)
- Canoe (10)
- Climbing (8)
- Cycling (51)
- Equestrian (11)
- Fencing (16)
- Goalball (2)
- Judo (16)
- Powerlifting (20)
- Rowing (5)
- Shooting (13)
- Sitting volleyball (2)
- Swimming (142)
- Table tennis (32)
- Taekwondo (10)
- Triathlon (12)
- Wheelchair basketball (2)
- Wheelchair rugby (1)
- Wheelchair tennis (6)

== Calendar ==
On November 19, 2025, the organizing committee published the first version of the competition schedule. The International Paralympic Committee approved the final schedule, and dates for the Summer Paralympic Games were released on May 27, 2026.

OC	Opening ceremony	●	Event competitions	1	Gold medal events	CC	Closing ceremony

August 2028		13th Sun	14th Mon	15th Tue	16th Wed	17th Thu	18th Fri	19th Sat	20th Sun	21st Mon	22nd Tue	23rd Wed	24th Thu	25th Fri	26th Sat	27th Sun	Events
Ceremonies				OC												CC	—N/a
Boccia			●		●	●	●	8	●	●	3						11
Blind football									●	●	●		●		●	1	1
Goalball		●	●		●	●	●	●	●	2							2
Para archery								●	1	1	1	●	2	2	2		9
Para athletics					14	21	16	14	20	15	17	14	18	11		4	164
Para badminton											●	●	●	●	7	9	16
Para canoe													●	5	5		10
Para climbing													●	4	2	2	8
Para cycling	Road										12	6	6	6	3		33
Para cycling	Track				5	5	3	5									18
Para equestrian					2	2	1	1		5							11
Para fencing					2	4	4	4	2								16
Para judo													5	5	6		16
Para powerlifting													6	6	6	2	20
Para rowing							●	2	3								5
Para swimming						15	14	15	14	13	14	14	13	15	15		142
Para table tennis					●	●	2	8	●	1	3	4	3	5	6		32
Para taekwondo												3	3	4			10
Para triathlon							6	6									12
Shooting para sport					2	1	2	2		3	1	1	1				13
Sitting volleyball						●	●	●	●	●	●	●	●	●	1	1	2
Wheelchair basketball					●	●	●	●	●	●	●	●	●	●	1	1	2
Wheelchair rugby		●	●		●	●	●	1									1
Wheelchair tennis							●	●	●	●	●	1	2	2	1		6
Daily medal events		0	0	0	25	48	48	66	40	38	51	43	59	65	55	20	565
Cumulative total		0	0	0	25	73	121	187	227	267	316	363	424	489	540	560	565
August 2028		13th Sun	14th Mon	15th Tue	16th Wed	17th Thu	18th Fri	19th Sat	20th Sun	21st Mon	22nd Tue	23rd Wed	24th Thu	25th Fri	26th Sat	27th Sun	Total events

== Marketing ==
=== Emblem ===
The emblems for the 2028 Summer Olympics and Paralympics were unveiled on September 1, 2020, featuring the characters "LA" and "28" in a stacked layout. The "A" in "LA" is designed to be interchangeable, with variations created in collaboration with local athletes, artists, and celebrities. Among the larger suite of logo variants are versions designed in collaboration with Paralympic athletes, including Scout Bassett (which is inspired by the infinity symbol), Ezra Frech, Lex Gillette, Jamal Hill, and Oz Sanchez.

== Notes ==
Preceded by Paris 2024	Summer Paralympics; Los Angeles; XVIII Paralympic Summer Games (2028)	Succeeded by Brisbane 2032
