= Goalball at the 2028 Summer Paralympics =

Goalball at the Paralympic Games
- Paralympic Goalball
- Venue: Peacock Theater, Los Angeles, United States
- Dates: 13–21 August 2028

Goalball at the 2028 Summer Paralympics will be held at the Peacock Theater, Los Angeles, United States.

By July 2026, the event dates were finalised for Sunday 13 to and including Monday 21 August 2028, before the Games opening ceremony, allowing Para powerlifting to take place in the second week in the same venue.

== Qualifying ==
The team sports would have eight participating teams for both men and women, the same as the 2024 Paris Paralympics, which was a reduction oḟ the usual ten teams each.

=== Men ===
| Means of qualification | Date | Venue | Berths | Qualified |
|---|---|---|---|---|
| Host country allocation | —N/a | —N/a | 1 | United States |
| 2026 Goalball World Championships | 2026 | (China) Hangzhou | 2 | China; Germany |
| Ranking tournament | | | 1 | |
| IBSA Asia-Pacific Championships | 2027 | | 1 | |
| 2027 Parapan American Games | 2027 | (Peru) Lima | 1 | |
| IBSA European Championships | 2027 | | 1 | |
| IBSA Africa Championships | 2027 | | 1 | |
| Total | | | 8 | |

=== Women ===
| Means of qualification | Date | Venue | Berths | Qualified |
|---|---|---|---|---|
| Host country allocation | —N/a | —N/a | 1 | United States |
| 2026 Goalball World Championships | 2026 | (China) Hangzhou | 2 | China; Israel |
| Ranking tournament | | | 1 | |
| IBSA Asia-Pacific Championships | 2027 | | 1 | |
| 2027 Parapan American Games | 2027 | (Peru) Lima | 1 | |
| IBSA European Championships | 2027 | | 1 | |
| IBSA Africa Championships | 2027 | | 1 | |
| Total | | | 8 | |

== Men's tournament ==
=== Competition format ===
The eight men's teams will be divided into two equal groups for a single round robin group stage. The top four teams of each group will advance to the quarter finals. All matches in the second stage are knock-out format. The host nation team is USA.

== Women's tournament ==
=== Competition format ===
The eight women's teams will be divided into two equal groups for a single round robin group stage. The top four teams of each group will advance to the quarter finals. All matches in the second stage are knock-out format. The host nation team is USA.
