= UCLA student housing =

Housing at University of California, Los Angeles

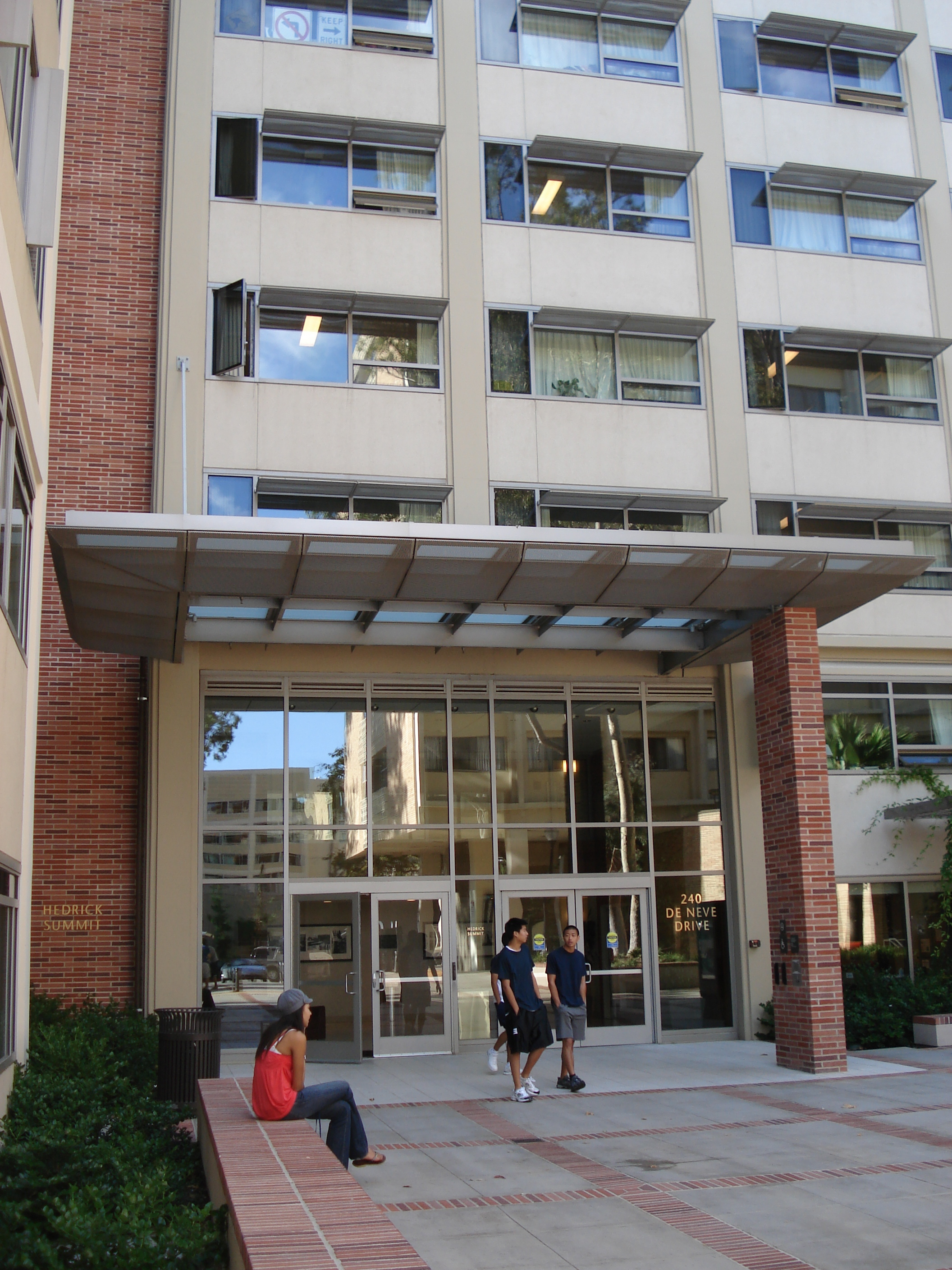
Hedrick Summit was built in 2005

Student housing owned by the University of California, Los Angeles is governed by two separate departments: the Office of Residential Life, and Housing and Hospitality Services, and provides housing for both undergraduates and graduate students, on and off-campus.

== Undergraduate ==
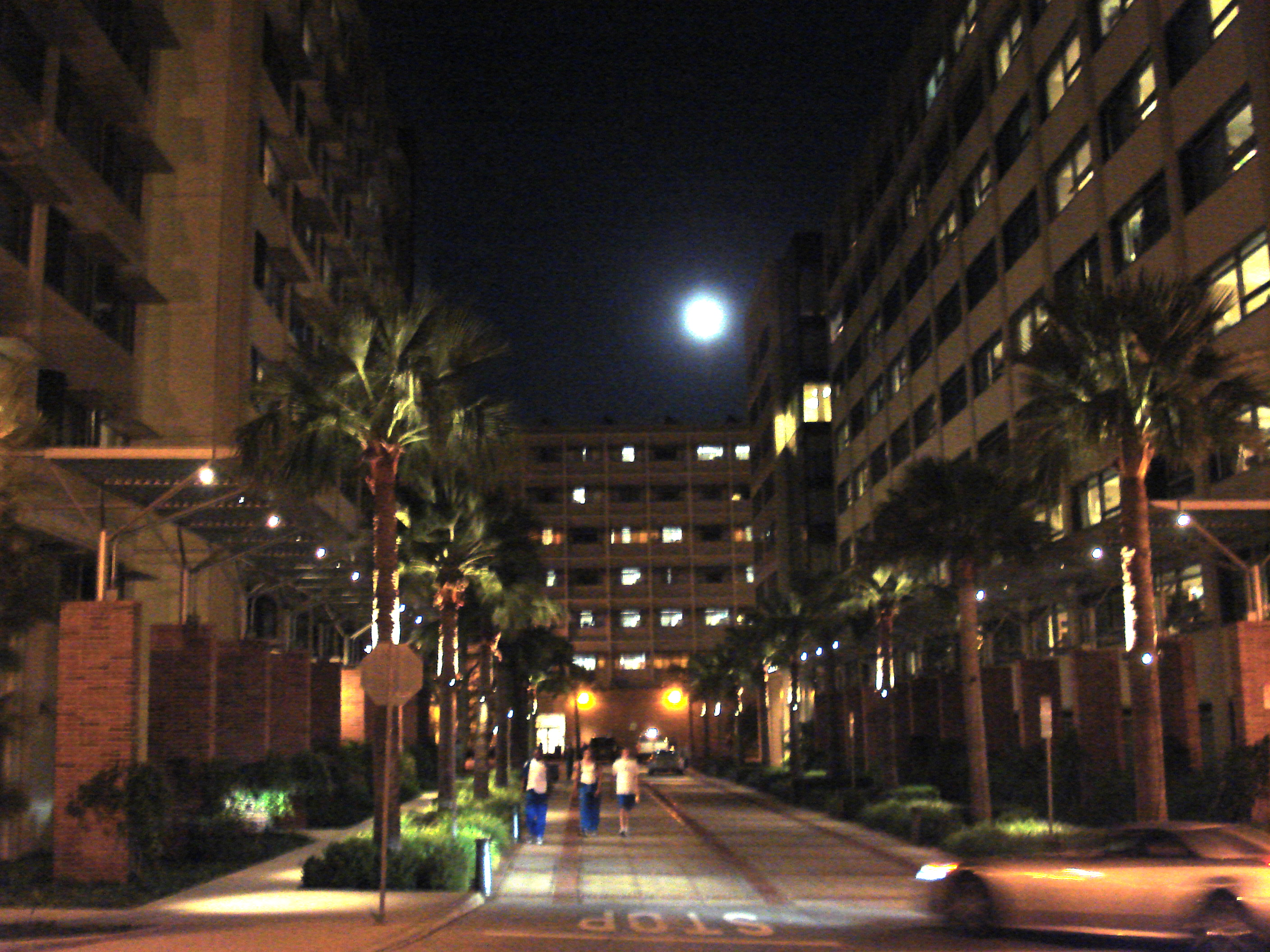
Rieber Court is surrounded by (from left to right) Rieber Terrace, Rieber Hall, and Rieber Vista.

UCLA's original residence hall was Hershey Hall, located on Hilgard Avenue in South Campus. It was named after Mira Hershey, who bequeathed $300,000 to have the all-women dorm built. The original Hershey Hall of the 1930s is still in use today as an academic building. A west wing addition was built in 1959. It primarily housed men, and was demolished after damage in the 1994 Northridge earthquake to make way for the Terasaki Life Sciences Building.

Today, much of UCLA's undergraduate residential community is located on a ridge on the northwestern edge of the campus called "the Hill". The Hill consists of residential complexes housing, dining halls, commons buildings containing student services, conference facilities, and classrooms; facilities for recreational and varsity sports; the Southern Regional Library; and Tom Bradley International Hall, which contains services for foreign students.

Additionally, UCLA owns a number of apartment buildings throughout Westwood known as the University Apartments, some reserved for graduate students but a number reserved for undergraduates.

Student life on the Hill is under the care of the Residential Life (ResLife), formerly called "Office of Residential Life (ORL)". Currently, incoming first-year students are guaranteed four years of on-campus housing and incoming transfer students are guaranteed two years of housing.

Starting in 2009, the Hill underwent the Northwest Campus In-fill Project, which added an additional 1,525 beds, 10 faculty in-residence apartments, a 750-seat dining hall, and four residential towers. Two of these buildings, Holly Ridge and Gardenia Way, which are part of De Neve Plaza, opened February 2012. The other two, Sproul Cove and Sproul Landing, were completed in September 2013. Sproul Cove stands on the previously unoccupied ridge below Rieber Hall. Sproul Landing stands on the former site of the Office of Residential Life, which has relocated to Tom Bradley International Hall.

In 2021, UCLA completed the construction of two additional residence halls on the Hill, Olympic Hall and Centennial Hall, built on an empty ridge between the Saxon and Hitch suites. These new halls provide another 621 rooms and 1,800 new beds for the UCLA undergraduate population, a makerspace and a quick service takeout restaurant.

As of fall 2021, the capacity of the Hill stands at 14,500 students.

=== Layout of the Hill ===
The Hill is divided into smaller complexes, each organized around a common open space and having its own student services, buffet-style dining halls, and quick-service restaurants, with students permitted to dine at any eatery on the Hill. The following is a listing of the communities, and the buildings located in them:

==== Centennial Hall ====
Named in honor of UCLA's centennial in 2019, it was completed in 2021 and is the newest addition to the Hill's residence halls along with Olympic Hall. Both halls contain deluxe triple and deluxe double style housing.

==== De Neve Plaza ====
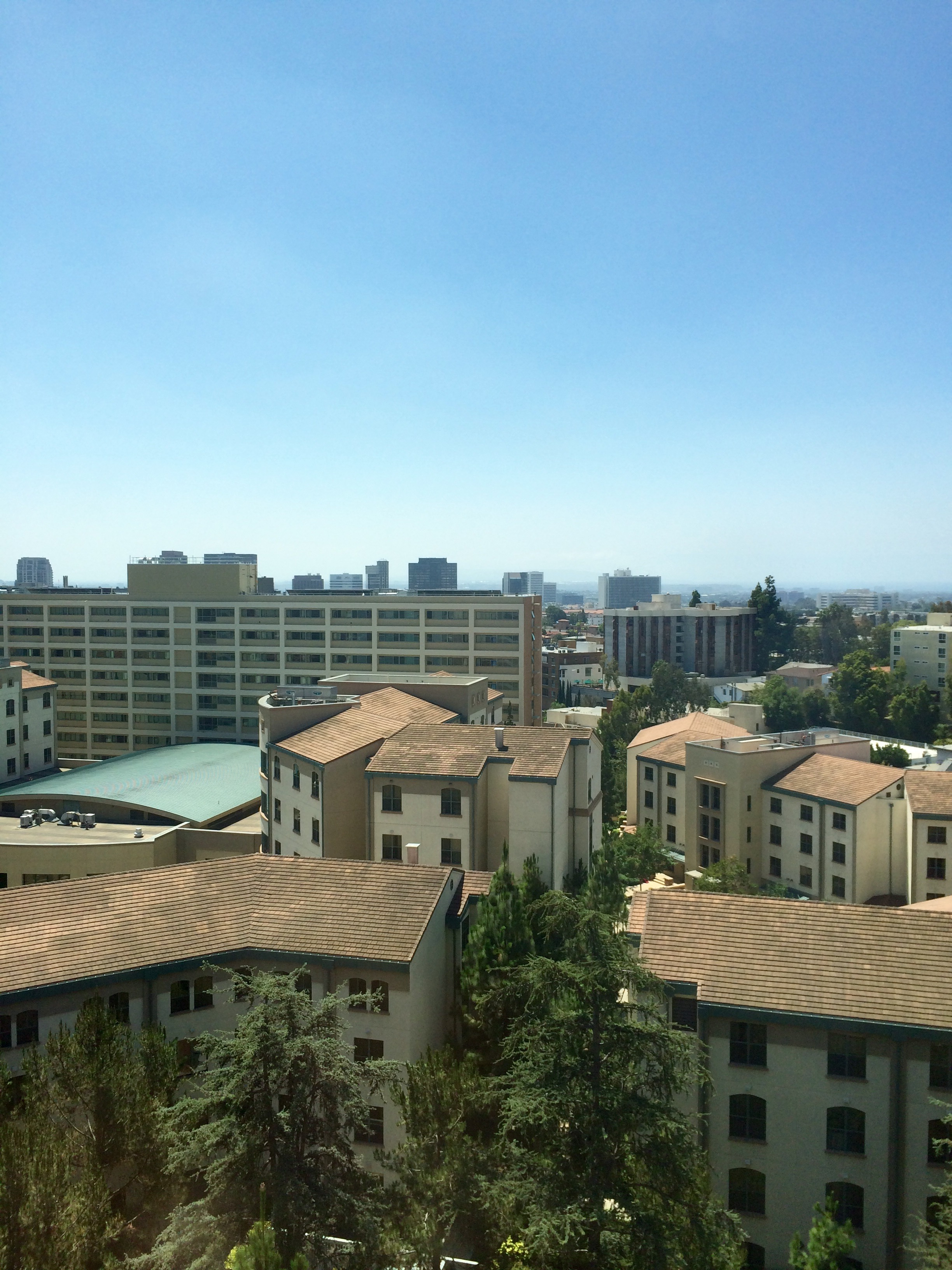
De Neve Plaza and Dykstra Hall

Named after Felipe de Neve (/dəˈnɛv/ də-NEV), "founder of Los Angeles", De Neve Plaza consists of these buildings:

- Acacia View
- Birch Heights
- Cedar Bluff
- Dogwood Glen
- Evergreen Pass
- Fir Grove
- Gardenia Way
- Holly Ridge
- De Neve Commons

Front desk services, as well as classrooms and conference facilities, are located in De Neve Commons. Dining options within the complex include the De Neve Residential Restaurant, which is converted nightly to the quick-service options, De Neve Late Night.

==== Dykstra Hall ====
Built in 1959, Dykstra (/ˈdaɪkstrə/ DYKE-strə) was the first dorm located on the Hill, as well as the first co-ed residence hall in the United States. The hall is named after UCLA Provost Clarence Dykstra. Though classified as its own separate building, it is considered part of De Neve Plaza for practical purposes, since it is adjacent to the De Neve buildings and physically connected to De Neve Commons (which also happens to be contiguous with Acacia View and Birch Heights). Also, front desk and mailroom services, recreational rooms, and the closest dining options for Dykstra residents are in De Neve Commons. Dykstra reopened for the 2013–2014 school year after a year of renovations.

==== Hedrick Court ====
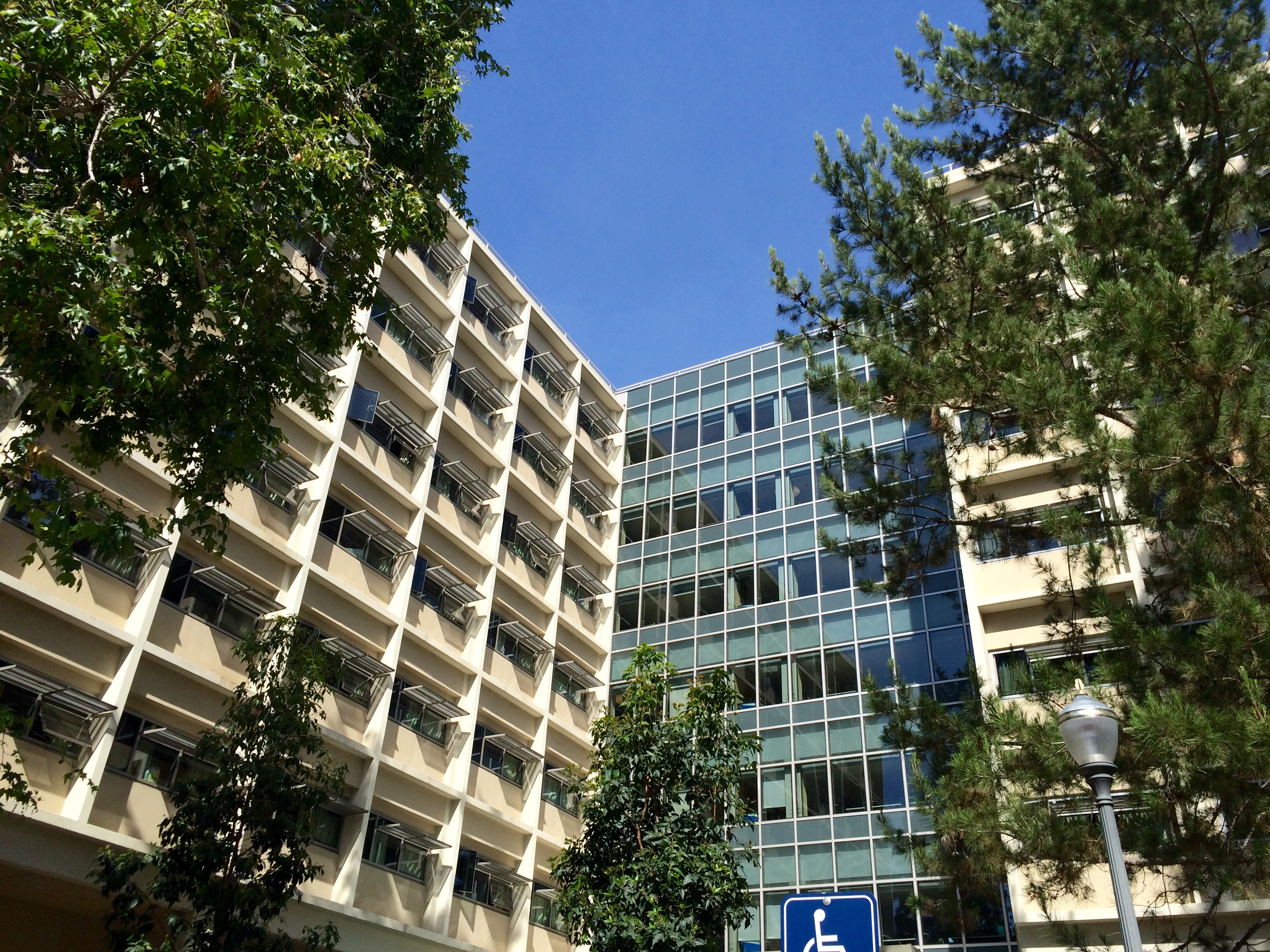
Hedrick Hall

Named after UCLA Provost Earle Raymond Hedrick (/ˈhɛdrɪk/ HED-rik).

- Hedrick Hall

Front desk and mailroom services, as well as recreation facilities, are in the ground floor of Hedrick Hall. The building's own dining option, "The Study at Hedrick", a takeout option connected to a 24-hour study lounge, is adjacent to the ground floor of Hedrick Hall. This building primarily houses 1st year students.

- Hedrick Summit

This building consists of nine floors and approximately 900 people. Amenities included within this complex include a TV lounge, recreation room, study lounges and controllable AC for every individual room. Hedrick Summit does not have its own dining option. Hedrick Summit typically houses 1st, 2nd or 3rd year undergraduates or 1st year transfer students.

- Hitch Suites

This all-suite complex consists of four low-rise buildings, lettered A-D. It is classified as an autonomous community, but is considered part of Hedrick Court for practical purposes. Front desk and mailroom services, as well as recreation rooms, are in the ground floor of Hedrick Hall. The closest dining options are located in Rieber Court. After a one-year renovation, Hitch was reopened for the 2014–2015 academic year. Hitch Suites primarily house 1st and 2nd year students along with 1st year transfers.

==== Olympic Hall ====
Named in honor of the 2028 Summer Olympics to be held in Los Angeles for which UCLA will provide athlete housing, this building has 9 stories and aided in accomplishing UCLA's goal of providing 4 years of guaranteed housing to undergraduate students. It was completed in 2021 and is the newest addition to the Hill's residence halls along with Centennial Hall. Includes The Drey as a quick-service food option and has a Makerspace designed to encourage student creation. Rieber Hall acts as both Olympic and Centennial Hall's front desks.

==== Rieber Court ====
Named after Charles H. Rieber (/ˈriːbər/ REE-bər), first dean of the UCLA College of Letters and Science.

- Rieber Hall
- Rieber Terrace
- Rieber Vista

Front desk and mailroom services are on the ground floor of Rieber Hall. Dining facilities within the complex include the Asian cuisine inspired Feast at Rieber adjacent to the ground floor of Rieber Hall and the quick-service option Rendezvous adjacent to the ground floor of Rieber Terrace.

- Saxon Suites

This all-suite complex consists of seven low-rise buildings, lettered E-K. It is classified as a separate community, but is considered part of Rieber Court for practical purposes, since front desk and mailroom services, recreation rooms, and the nearest dining options for Saxon residents are in Rieber Court.

==== Sproul Plaza ====
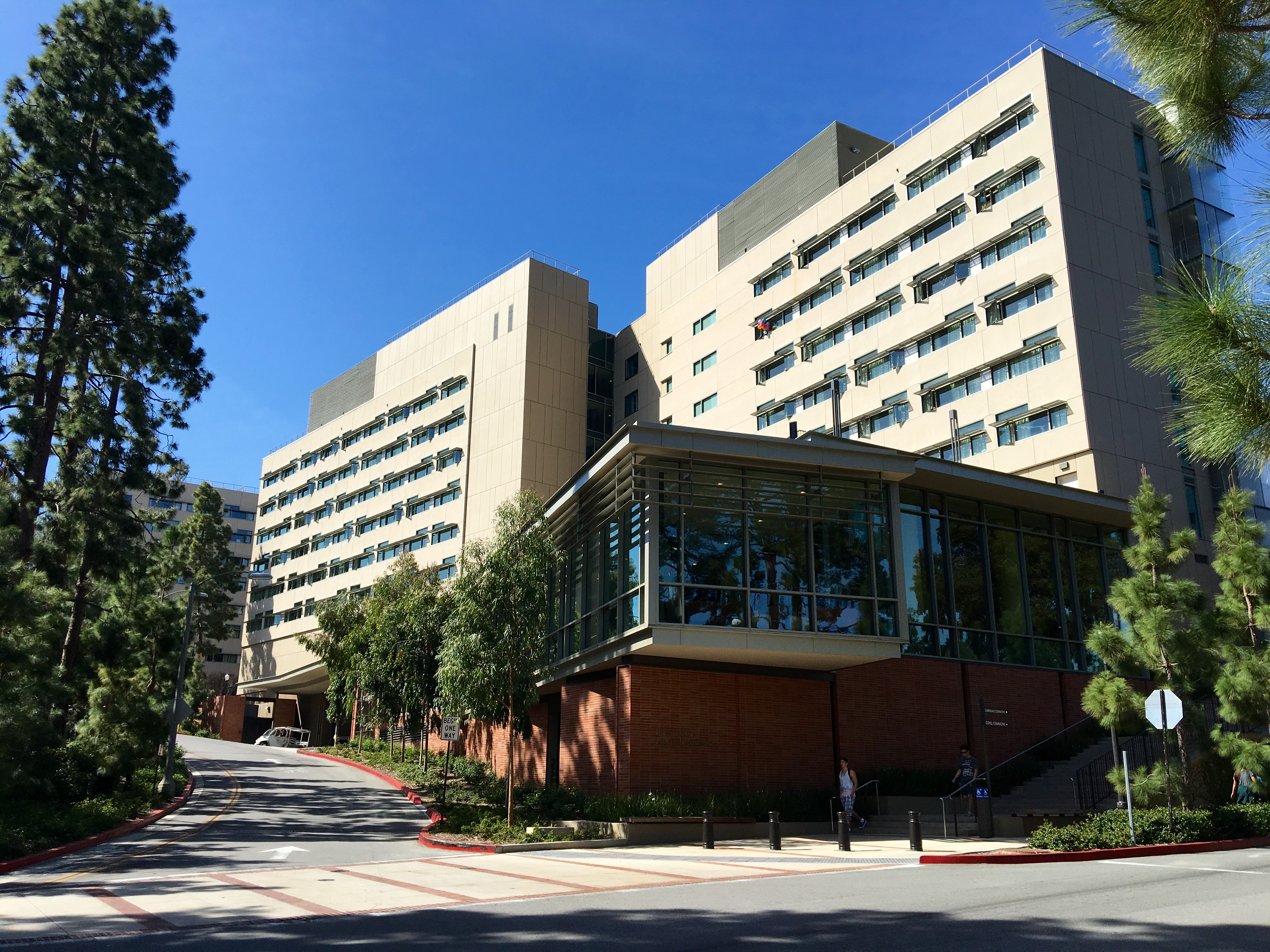
Carnesale Commons

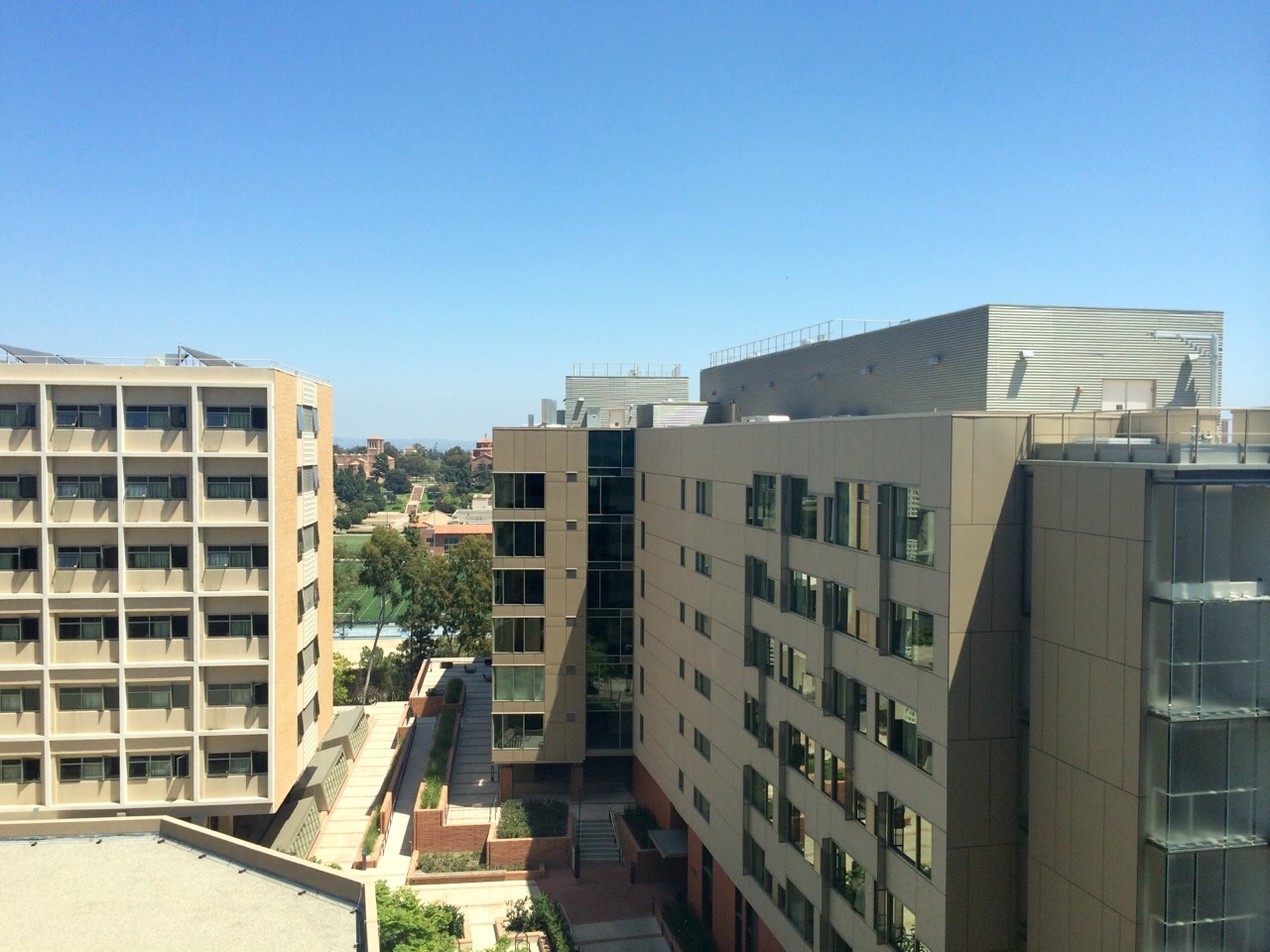
Sproul Hall (left) and Landing (right). Royce Hall can be seen in the distance.

Named after UC President Robert Gordon Sproul (/spraʊl/ SPROWL).

- Sproul Hall
- Sproul Cove
- Sproul Landing
- Carnesale Commons (formerly Sproul Presidio) -- named after UCLA Chancellor Emeritus Albert Carnesale
- Northwest Campus Auditorium

Front desk and mailroom services are in the lobby of Sproul Hall. The complex's main dining facility, Bruin Plate, is located in Carnesale Commons, which opened as Sproul Presidio but was later renamed after former UCLA chancellor Albert Carnesale in October 2013. A quick-service option, Bruin Café, is adjacent to the ground floor of Sproul Hall. Conference facilities are located in the Northwest Campus Auditorium, as well as Carnesale Commons. The complex also contains a gym known as the Bruin Fitness Center (BFit).

==== Sunset Village ====
- Canyon Point
- Courtside
- Delta Terrace
- Covel Commons -- named after UCLA physician and benefactor Mitchel Covel

Front desk and mailroom services, as well as classrooms and conference facilities, are located in Covel Commons. Dining facilities include the Epicuria, formerly the Covel Commons Residential Restaurant, and quick-service option of Café 1919 adjacent to the ground floor of Delta Terrace. Canyon Point reopened following renovation during the 2013–2014 academic year. Canyon Point and Delta Terrace consist of solely "plaza shared" rooms, wherein two dorms (double or triple dorms) share a bathroom in a 'jack-and-jill' layout. Courtside, on the other hand, consists of only "plaza private" rooms, where 1 dorm (typically a double or triple) has one attached en suite bathroom. All 3 buildings are made up of 8 houses (each housing approximately 50-100 students). These 8 houses are semi-connected (for instance, all 8 houses in Courtside have separate entrances on the ground floor, but are uniformly connected on the second and third floors).

Next to Sunset Village is the Sunset Canyon Recreation Center, the primary sports complex on the hill, containing tennis courts, swimming pools, basketball courts, and volleyball courts for resident use.

=== Room types ===
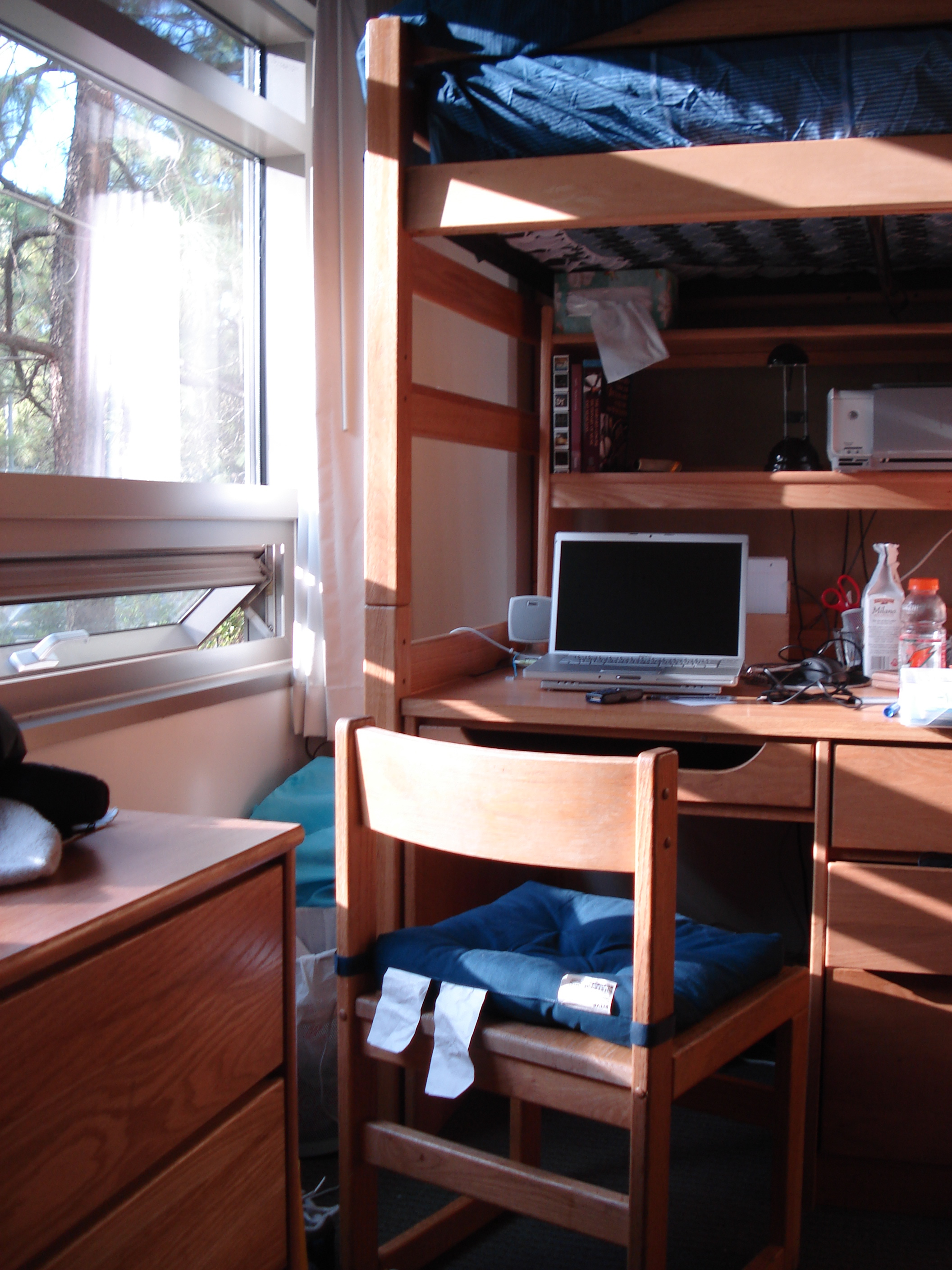
Desk and bed area of a plaza-style room in Hedrick Summit

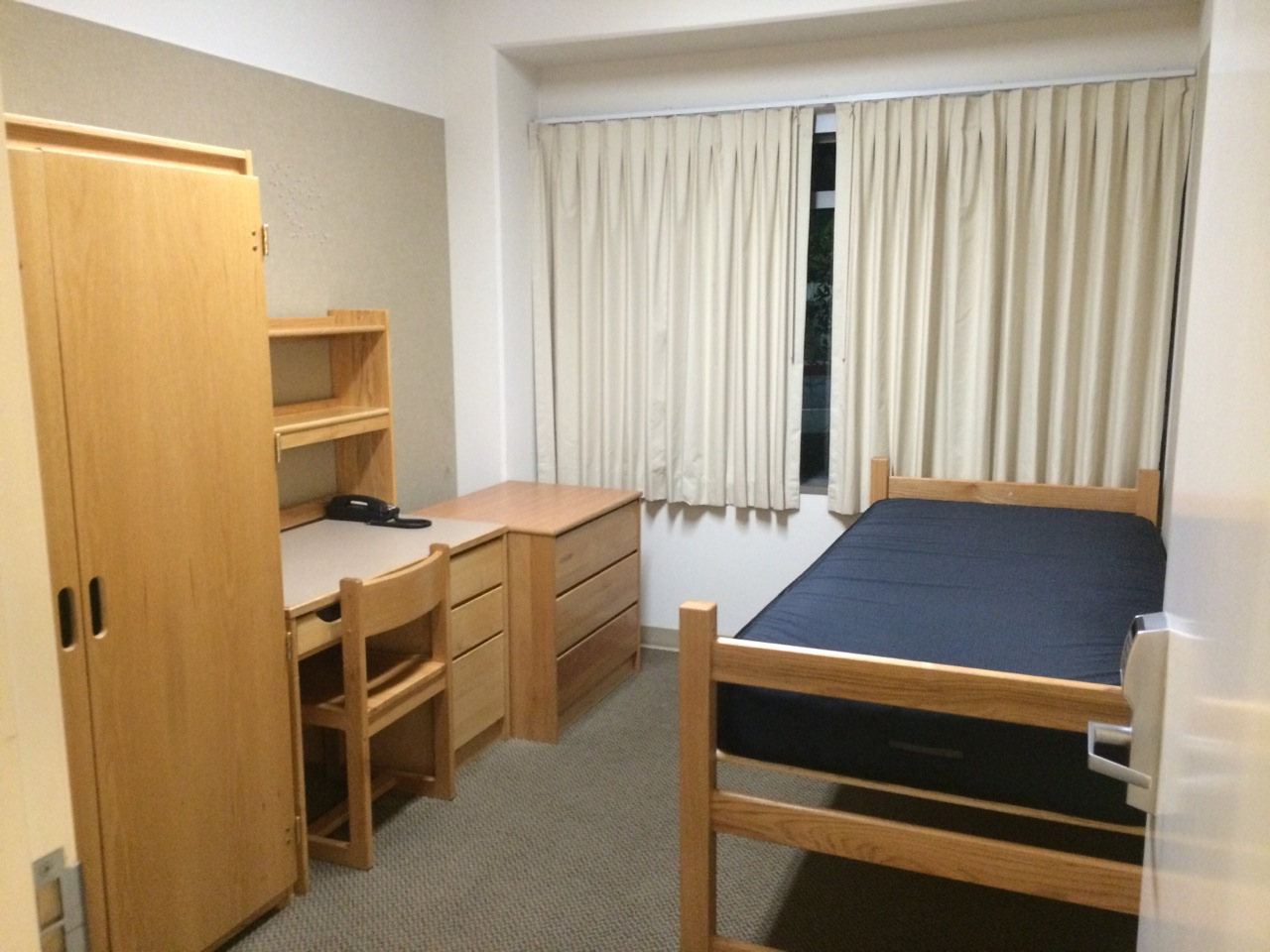
Hedrick Summit Single Room

There are three different living options for undergraduates, each providing different levels of social interaction, noise level, amenities, and privacy.

There are traditional high-rise Halls, with students grouped by floors, sharing a gender-specific bathroom with 40-50 others. Buildings of this sort include: Dykstra Hall, Hedrick Hall, Rieber Hall, and Sproul Hall. Recently, the Deluxe Residential Hall format has also been introduced, which has some features of the residential plaza, such as more spacious rooms and a thermostat in each room to control air-conditioning. This configuration is found in De Neve Gardenia Way, De Neve Holly Ridge, Sproul Cove, Centennial Hall, Olympic Hall, and Sproul Landing.

The second configuration is the Plaza, which has the same general amenities as the Halls, but has more spacious rooms, and has a private bathroom or shared bathroom with an adjacent room. The twelve plaza buildings include: Hedrick Summit, Rieber Terrace, Rieber Vista, all residential buildings in Sunset Village, and all residential buildings in De Neve Plaza except for Holly and Gardenia.

There are also Suites, which are standalone units supporting 4-6 students, with private bathroom and living space. The complex comprises several buildings sharing a laundry room and outdoor recreational amenities. This configuration is found in Hitch Suites and Saxon Suites.

=== Resident Assistants ===
Each floor or community on The Hill is overseen by one or two Residential Assistants (depending on the community size). These "RAs" are students staff who work to incorporate ResLife's "Core 5" Principles into the living environment. Typically, these RAs host "programs" (events) to encourage residents to meet each other, explore LA and be academically successful. Classic programs include visiting Santa Monica, going to the Ropes Course at Sunset Rec or getting free massages during midterms. These Resident Assistants go through an extensive and competitive interview and training process before getting the position.

In the University Apartments (which are overseen only by Housing and not ResLife), Apartment Coordinators are available to help students.

=== University apartments ===
UCLA also owns and operates 13 apartment complexes around Westwood for upper-division undergraduate students. These include

- Gayley Court
- Gayley Heights
- Gayley Towers
- Glenrock & Glenrock West
- Landfair
- Landfair Vista
- Levering Terrace
- Westwood Chateau
- Westwood Palm
- Tipuana
- Palo Verde
- Laurel

With the completion of the construction of the most recent apartment complexes, UCLA now guarantees 4 years of undergraduate housing.

== Graduate ==
Roughly 3,000 graduate students live in one of six UCLA-owned apartment complexes or communities. As of 2007, UCLA housed 26% of its graduate and professional students.

The Hilgard, Rose Avenue, Keystone/Mentone, and Venice/Barry apartments provide housing for single students. The University Village apartments provide family housing.

- Weyburn Terrace. In 2002, the university began constructing Phase 1 of Weyburn Terrace, a seven building apartment community with 1,387 beds, in order to recruit top graduate students from around the world. Previously, there had been no university-operated graduate housing on or near the main campus since the demolition of a graduate student-only dorm damaged by the 1994 Northridge earthquake. The project suffered numerous delays, but was fully completed before the Fall 2005 term. Weyburn Terrace enabled UCLA to provide housing to approximately fifty percent of incoming graduate and professional students. It also served as housing for displaced Tulane University law students who visited at UCLA during the Fall semester following Hurricane Katrina. A limited number of units were available with furniture for an additional fee. The buildings in Weyburn Terrace are all named after trees: Aloe, Magnolia, Sycamore, Palm, Jacaranda, Cypress, and Olive. In January 2026, UCLA Housing announced that the Weyburn Terrace complex will be converted into undergraduate student housing in order to fulfill UCLA's four-year housing guarantee for undergraduate students. Residents of Aloe, Magnolia, and Sycamore were required to vacate by July 1st, 2026, with the remaining graduate students required to vacate by July 1st, 2027. The Graduate Students Association (GSA) condemned the conversion and the lack of graduate student input in the decision, with many students noting that the remaining graduate student housing is located at a much greater distance from campus than Weyburn and contain more students per apartment.
- Hilgard Apartments. The Hilgard Apartments consist of two complexes located on the east edge of campus on Hilgard Avenue in Westwood. Each three-story building has a central courtyard, laundry room, and subterranean parking. All 81 units are furnished studio apartments with full kitchens. The Hilgard Apartments are 100% smoke-free in order to maintain the indoor air quality and only non-smokers will be allowed to live there. The Hilgard Apartments are for single students. In 2027, the Hilgard Apartments will be the only remaining graduate student housing in Westwood.
- University Village. University Village provides student community living for married students, same-sex domestic partners and single parents. Units consist of unfurnished one-, two- and three-bedrooms. It is reserved for family use. The University Village apartments are located directly adjacent to the 405 Freeway, on the far eastern edge of Mar Vista and the western edge of Palms respectively.
- Rose Avenue Apartments. Rose Avenue has 93 unfurnished units, primarily two-bedroom, located across from the University Village complex in Palms. Two-bedroom apartments are approximately 870 square feet (81 m^{2}). The complex was not built specifically to house families, but families may reside here.
- Keystone/Mentone. Keystone/Mentone, located in Palms, is a 244-unit complex contains one- and two-bedroom unfurnished apartments. The complex was not built specifically to house families, but families may reside here.
- Venice/Barry. The Venice/Barry apartments is a 140-unit building containing unfurnished junior one-bedroom, one-bedroom and two-bedroom apartments located in Mar Vista. The complex was not built specifically to house families, but families may reside here. UCLA BruinBus provides student-exclusive direct transportation from the complex to campus.
- Venice & Berryman. The Venice & Berryman Apartments contain furnished three-bedroom, five-bedroom, and six-bedroom units. The complex is located in Mar Vista. UCLA BruinBus provides student-exclusive direct transportation from the complex to campus.
- Canfield Apartments. The Canfield Apartments contain furnished studio, one-bedroom, two-bedroom, and three-bedroom units. The complex is located in Castle Heights near Palms directly north of the 10 Freeway. UCLA Housing acquired the newly-constructed building in 2024. The Canfield Apartments were constructed as transit-oriented development, in close proximity to the Santa Monica Big Blue Bus line 17 and the LA Metro E Line station in Palms. The complex contains no parking.
- Wilshire Apartments.
- The Boulevard Apartments.

The complexes which permit families are zoned to the Los Angeles Unified School District.

- The Keystone-Mentone complex is zoned to Palms Elementary School, Palms Middle School, and Hamilton High School.
- Rose Avenue is zoned to Charnock Road Elementary School, Palms Middle School, and Venice High School. Rose Avenue had been rezoned from Hamilton to Venice in 2007.
- University Village is zoned to Clover Elementary School, Webster Middle School, and Venice High School.
- Venice-Barry is zoned to Grand View Elementary School, Webster Middle School, and Venice High School.
