= Equestrian events at the 2028 Summer Olympics – Qualification =

The 200 quota places for the equestrian events at the 2028 Summer Olympics were divided across the three disciplines (75 for jumping, 65 for eventing, and 60 for dressage). Teams in each discipline consisted of three horse and rider pairs; any National Olympic Committee (NOC) that qualified a team (20 teams for jumping, 16 for eventing, and 15 for dressage) also received three entries in the individual competition for that discipline. NOCs that did not qualify teams could earn one individual place in dressage and jumping and up to two individual places in eventing, for a total of 15 entries in jumping and dressage and 17 for eventing. Teams qualified primarily through specific competitions (World Equestrian Games and continental tournaments), while individuals qualified through rankings. The host nation, the United States, automatically qualified a team in each discipline.

== Timeline ==
The following is a timeline of the qualification events for the equestrian events at the 2028 Summer Olympics.

Event	Date	Venue
2026 FEI World Championships	August 11–23, 2026	(Germany) Aachen
2027 Pan American Games (Groups D and E)	July 23–August 8, 2027	(Peru) Lima
2027 European Jumping Championships	August 11–15, 2027	(Belgium) Waregem
2027 FEI European Dressage Championships	August 17–22, 2027	(Denmark) Randbøl
2027 European Eventing Championships	September 14–19, 2027	(Switzerland) Avenches
2027 Eventing Nations Cup	7 - 10 October 2027	(Netherlands) Boekelo
2027 Group C dressage qualification event	2027	TBC
2027 Group C eventing qualification event	2027	TBC
2027 Group C jumping qualification event	2027	TBC
2027 Group F jumping qualification event	2027	TBC
2027 Groups F/G eventing qualification event	2027	TBC
2027 Group G jumping qualification event	2027	TBC
End of FEI ranking period	December 31, 2027	—

== Qualification summary ==
Nation	Individual			Team			Total
Nation	Dressage	Eventing	Jumping	Dressage	Eventing	Jumping	Total
Australia	3	-	-	Yes	-	-	3
Belgium	3	3	3	Yes	Yes	Yes	9
Denmark	3	-	-	Yes	-	-	3
France	-	-	3	-	-	Yes	3
Germany	3	3	3	Yes	Yes	Yes	9
Great Britain	3	3	3	Yes	Yes	Yes	9
Ireland	-	3	3	-	Yes	Yes	6
Italy	-	-	3	-	-	Yes	3
Netherlands	3	-	-	Yes	-	-	3
New Zealand	-	3	-	-	Yes	-	3
Sweden	3	3	-	Yes	Yes	-	6
Switzerland	-	3	3	-	Yes	Yes	6
United States	3	3	3	Yes	Yes	Yes	9
Total: 13 NOCs	24	24	24	8	8	8	72

== Dressage ==
=== Team ===
Event	Date	Venue	Vacancies	Qualified
Host Nation	–	–	1	United States
2026 FEI World Championships	August 11–23, 2026	(Germany) Aachen	6	Germany; Great Britain; Denmark; Belgium; Netherlands; Sweden
2027 FEI European Dressage Championships (Groups A and B)	August 17–22, 2027	(Denmark) Randbøl	3	
2027 Group C qualification event	2027	TBC	1	
2027 Pan American Games (Groups D and E)	July 23–August 8, 2027	(Peru) Lima	2	
2026 FEI World Championships (Group F)	August 11–23, 2026	(Germany) Aachen	~~1~~ 0	–
2027 Group F qualification event	2027	TBC	1	
2026 FEI World Championships (Group G)	August 11–23, 2026	(Germany) Aachen	1	Australia
Total			15	

=== Individual ===
Event	Date	Venue	Vacancies	Qualified NOCs
Team Members	—	—	45	See above
2027 Pan American Games (Groups D and E)	July 23–August 8, 2027	(Peru) Lima	2	
FEI Olympic Athletes Ranking – Dressage
Group A (North Western Europe)	December 31, 2027	—	2	
Group B (South Western Europe)	December 31, 2027	—	2	
Group C (Central & Eastern Europe; Central Asia)	December 31, 2027	—	2	
Groups D and E (Americas)	December 31, 2027	—	2	
Group F (Africa & Middle East)	December 31, 2027	—	2	
Group G (South East Asia, Oceania)	December 31, 2027	—	2	
Additional	December 31, 2027	—	1	
Total			60	

== Eventing ==
=== Team ===
Event	Date	Venue	Vacancies	Qualified NOCs
Host Nation	—	—	1	United States
2026 FEI World Championships	August 11–23, 2026	(Germany) Aachen	7	Great Britain; Germany; Ireland; Switzerland; New Zealand; Sweden; Belgium
2027 European Eventing Championships (Groups A and B)	September 14–19, 2027	(Switzerland) Avenches	2	
2027 Group C qualification event	2027	TBC	1	
2027 Pan American Games (Groups D and E)	July 23–August 8, 2027	(Peru) Lima	2	
Groups F and G qualification event	2027	TBC	2	
2027 Eventing Nations Cup	2027	Various	1	
Total			16	

=== Individual ===
Event	Date	Vacancies	Qualified NOCs
Team Members	—	48	See above
FEI Olympic Athletes Ranking – Eventing
Group A (North Western Europe)	December 31, 2027	2	
Group B (South Western Europe)	December 31, 2027	2	
Group C (Central & Eastern Europe; Central Asia)	December 31, 2027	2	
Groups D and E (Americas)	December 31, 2027	4	
Group F (Africa & Middle East)	December 31, 2027	2	
Group G (South East Asia, Oceania)	December 31, 2027	2	
Additional	December 31, 2027	3	
Total		65	

== Jumping ==
=== Team ===
Event	Date	Venue	Vacancies	Qualified NOCs
Host Nation	—	—	1	United States
2026 FEI World Championships	August 11–23, 2026	(Germany) Aachen	7	Germany; Belgium; Great Britain; Italy; Switzerland; Ireland; France
2027 European Jumping Championships (Groups A and B)	August 11–15, 2027	(Belgium) Waregem	3	
2027 Group C qualification event	2027	TBC	2	
2027 Pan American Games (Groups D and E)	July 23–August 8, 2027	(Peru) Lima	3	
2027 Group F qualification event	2027	TBC	2	
2027 Group G qualification event	2027	TBC	2	
Total			20	

=== Individual ===
Event	Date	Venue	Vacancies	Qualified NOCs
Team Members	—	—	60	See above
2027 Pan American Games (Groups D and E)	July 23–August 8, 2027	(Peru) Lima	3	
FEI Olympic Athletes Ranking – Jumping
Group A (North Western Europe)	December 31, 2027	—	2	
Group B (South Western Europe)	December 31, 2027	—	2	
Group C (Central & Eastern Europe; Central Asia)	December 31, 2027	—	2	
Groups D and E (Americas)	December 31, 2027	—	1	
Group F (Africa & Middle East)	December 31, 2027	—	2	
Group G (South East Asia, Oceania)	December 31, 2027	—	2	
Additional	December 31, 2027	—	1	
Total			75	
