= Gymnastics at the 2028 Summer Olympics – Qualification =

Qualifying phase for gymnastics

This article describes the qualifying phase for gymnastics at the 2028 Summer Olympics. A total of 318 gymnasts (192 in artistic, 94 in rhythmic and 32 in trampoline) would qualify.

The qualification pathways for the 2028 Summer Olympics in the artistic and rhythmic gymnastics were slightly adjusted in comparison to those in 2024.

In the artistic team event, three teams that finish on the podium qualify for the Olympics through the 2026 World Artistic Gymnastics Championships in Rotterdam, Netherlands, with the remaining nine quota places distributed at the same meet in Chengdu, China, the following year. Also at the latter competition, eight individual spots for men and fourteen individual spots for women will be awarded following the completion of the all-around qualifications. Further, only one medalist per the apparatus final can obtain a quota, as opposed to the highest overall ranked athlete in the previous system. The gymnasts will also have the opportunity to earn additional spots in separate apparatus events during the 2028 World Cup series.

In rhythmic gymnastics, the 2026 World Championships, held in Frankfurt, Germany, witness individual and group all-around medalists book their tickets to Los Angeles. Most quota places will be awarded at the same meet in Baku, Azerbaijan, the following year, although some of them were moved to the 2026–2027 World Cup series as a new pathway.

Up to half of the trampoline qualifying slots will be awarded to the highest-ranked gymnasts at the 2027 World Championships in with the majority coming from the 2027–2028 World Cup series.

Across all gymnastics disciplines, the remaining places will be offered to the gymnasts vying for qualification at their respective continental meets.

== Qualification summary ==
Nation	Artistic		Rhythmic		Trampoline		Total
Nation	Men	Women	Individual	Group	Men	Women	Total
Brazil				Yes			5
Bulgaria			1				1
China	5	5					10
Germany			1				1
Italy			1				1
Japan	5	5		Yes			15
Russia	5						5
Spain				Yes			5
United States	1	5	1	Yes	1	1	14
Total: 9 NOCs	16	15	4	20	1	1	57

== Timeline ==
Artistic Gymnastics
Event	Date	Location
2026 World Artistic Gymnastics Championships	October 17–25, 2026	(Netherlands) Rotterdam
2027 World Artistic Gymnastics Championships	September 28 – October 6, 2027	(China) Chengdu
2028 Apparatus World Cup Series	February 24 – April 15, 2028	Various
2028 Continental Championships: 2028 European Championships (MAG, WAG); 2028 Pan American Championships; 2028 African Championships; 2028 Asian Championships (MAG, WAG); 2028 Oceania Championships	May 24–28, 2028; TBA, 2028; TBA, 2028; May, 2028; May, 2028	(Greece) Athens (Brazil) TBA; TBA; TBA; TBA
Rhythmic Gymnastics
Event	Date	Location
2026 Rhythmic Gymnastics World Championships	August 12–16, 2026	(Germany) Frankfurt
2026–2027 Rhythmic Gymnastics World Cup Series	March 28, 2026 – June 13, 2027 (8 competitions)	Various
2027 Rhythmic Gymnastics World Championships	September 15–19, 2027	(Azerbaijan) Baku
2028 Continental Championships: 2028 European Championships; 2028 Pan American Championships; 2028 African Championships; 2028 Asian Championships; 2028 Oceania Championships	May 3–7, 2028; April-May, 2028; April-May, 2028; April-May, 2028; April-May, 2028	(France) Orléans (Brazil) TBA (Angola) Quilamba; TBA; TBA
Trampoline
Event	Date	Location
2027 Trampoline Gymnastics World Championships	November 10-13, 2027	(Bulgaria) Sofia
2027–28 Trampoline World Cup series	May 28, 2027 – April 23, 2028 (6 competitions)	Various
2028 Continental Championships: 2028 Pan American Championships; 2028 African Championships; 2028 Asian Championships; 2028 European Championships; 2028 Oceania Championships	TBA, 2028; TBA, 2028; TBA, 2028; TBA, 2028; TBA, 2028	(Brazil) TBA; TBA; TBA; TBA; TBA

== Artistic ==
=== Men's ===
==== Teams ====
Event	Standard	Qualified national team
Teams of five
2026 World Artistic Gymnastics Championships	Team places 1–3	Japan; Russia; China
2027 World Artistic Gymnastics Championships	Team places 1–9 (among non-qualified teams)	
Total		60 (12 teams of 5)

==== Individuals ====
Event	Standard	Qualified gymnast
2027 World Artistic Gymnastics Championships (Note: Athletes from NOCs with a qualified team are not eligible.) (1 quota per NOC)	Team places 10–12 (among non-qualified teams)	
2027 World Artistic Gymnastics Championships (1 quota per NOC)	All-around	
2027 World Artistic Gymnastics Championships (Note: Only medalists are eligible. Athletes from NOCs with a qualified team, or who have secured a place via the all-around are not eligible.) (max. 3 quotas per NOC across all apparatus)	Floor	
2027 World Artistic Gymnastics Championships (max. 3 quotas per NOC across all apparatus)	Pommel horse	
2027 World Artistic Gymnastics Championships (max. 3 quotas per NOC across all apparatus)	Rings	
2027 World Artistic Gymnastics Championships (max. 3 quotas per NOC across all apparatus)	Vault	
2027 World Artistic Gymnastics Championships (max. 3 quotas per NOC across all apparatus)	Parallel bars	
2027 World Artistic Gymnastics Championships (max. 3 quotas per NOC across all apparatus)	Horizontal bar	
2028 FIG Artistic Gymnastics World Cup series (1 quota per NOC per apparatus)	Floor	
2028 FIG Artistic Gymnastics World Cup series (1 quota per NOC per apparatus)	Pommel horse	
2028 FIG Artistic Gymnastics World Cup series (1 quota per NOC per apparatus)	Rings	
2028 FIG Artistic Gymnastics World Cup series (1 quota per NOC per apparatus)	Vault	
2028 FIG Artistic Gymnastics World Cup series (1 quota per NOC per apparatus)	Parallel bars	
2028 FIG Artistic Gymnastics World Cup series (1 quota per NOC per apparatus)	Horizontal bar	
2028 Continental Championships (1 quota per NOC; all-around qualification)	Africa	
2028 Continental Championships (1 quota per NOC; all-around qualification)	Americas	
2028 Continental Championships (1 quota per NOC; all-around qualification)	Asia	
2028 Continental Championships (1 quota per NOC; all-around qualification)	Europe	
2028 Continental Championships (1 quota per NOC; all-around qualification)	Oceania	
Reserved places	Host nation	(United States)
Reserved places	Reallocation	
Reserved places	Tripartite invitation	
Total		36

=== Women's ===
==== Teams ====
Event	Standard	Qualified national team
Teams of five
2026 World Artistic Gymnastics Championships	Team places 1–3	China; United States; Japan
2027 World Artistic Gymnastics Championships	Team places 1–9 (among non-qualified teams)	
Total		60 (12 teams of 5)

==== Individuals ====
Event	Standard	Qualified gymnast
2027 World Artistic Gymnastics Championships (1 quota per NOC)	Team places 10–12 (among non-qualified teams)	
2027 World Artistic Gymnastics Championships (1 quota per NOC)	All-around	
2027 World Artistic Gymnastics Championships (max. 3 quotas per NOC across all apparatus)	Vault	
2027 World Artistic Gymnastics Championships (max. 3 quotas per NOC across all apparatus)	Uneven Bars	
2027 World Artistic Gymnastics Championships (max. 3 quotas per NOC across all apparatus)	Balance beam	
2027 World Artistic Gymnastics Championships (max. 3 quotas per NOC across all apparatus)	Floor	
2028 FIG Artistic Gymnastics World Cup series (1 quota per NOC per apparatus)	Vault	
2028 FIG Artistic Gymnastics World Cup series (1 quota per NOC per apparatus)	Uneven Bars	
2028 FIG Artistic Gymnastics World Cup series (1 quota per NOC per apparatus)	Balance beam	
2028 FIG Artistic Gymnastics World Cup series (1 quota per NOC per apparatus)	Floor	
2028 Continental Championships (1 quota per NOC; all-around qualification)	Africa	
2028 Continental Championships (1 quota per NOC; all-around qualification)	Americas	
2028 Continental Championships (1 quota per NOC; all-around qualification)	Asia	
2028 Continental Championships (1 quota per NOC; all-around qualification)	Europe	
2028 Continental Championships (1 quota per NOC; all-around qualification)	Oceania	
Reserved places	Host nation	Host nation qualified above
Reserved places	Reallocation	
Reserved places	Tripartite invitation	
Total		36

== Rhythmic ==
=== Individual all-around ===
Event	Standard	Qualified NOC
2026 Rhythmic Gymnastics World Championships; Places 1–3 (max. 2 per NOC)	All-around	Bulgaria; Germany; Italy
2026–2027 Rhythmic Gymnastics World Cup Series; Places 1–2 (max. 2 per NOC)	All-around	
2027 Rhythmic Gymnastics World Championships; Places 1–12 (max. 2 per NOC) (Note: Athletes from NOCs with two quotas from the 2026 World Championships are not eligible.)	All-around	
2028 Continental Championships; All-around (max. 1 per NOC)	Africa	
2028 Continental Championships; All-around (max. 1 per NOC)	Americas	
2028 Continental Championships; All-around (max. 1 per NOC)	Asia	
2028 Continental Championships; All-around (max. 1 per NOC)	Europe	
2028 Continental Championships; All-around (max. 1 per NOC)	Oceania	
Reserved places	Host nation	United States
Reserved places	Reallocation	
Reserved places	Tripartite invitation	
Total		24

=== Group all-around ===
Event	Standard	Qualified team
2026 Rhythmic Gymnastics World Championships; Team places 1–3	All-around	Brazil; Japan; Spain
2026–2027 Rhythmic Gymnastics World Cup Series; Winner	All-around (among non-qualified groups)	
2027 Rhythmic Gymnastics World Championships; Team places 1–4	All-around (among non-qualified groups)	
2028 Continental Championships; All-around (max. 1 per NOC)	Africa	
2028 Continental Championships; All-around (max. 1 per NOC)	Americas	
2028 Continental Championships; All-around (max. 1 per NOC)	Asia	
2028 Continental Championships; All-around (max. 1 per NOC)	Europe	
2028 Continental Championships; All-around (max. 1 per NOC)	Oceania	
Reserved places	Host nation	United States
Reserved places	Reallocation	
Total		70

== Trampoline ==
=== Men's ===
Event	Standard		Quotas awarded	Qualified NOC
2027 Trampoline Gymnastics World Championships	Top 8 (max. 1 per NOC)		Up to 8	
2027–2028 Trampoline World Cup series	Up to 12 gymnasts qualified		Up to 12	
2028 Continental Championships	1 per continent	Africa	0 or 1	
2028 Continental Championships	1 per continent	Americas	0 or 1	
2028 Continental Championships	1 per continent	Asia	0 or 1	
2028 Continental Championships	1 per continent	Europe	0 or 1	
2028 Continental Championships	1 per continent	Oceania	0 or 1	
Reserved places	Host nation		1	[[]] (USA)
Reserved places	Tripartite invitation		0 or 1	
Total			16	

=== Women's ===
Event	Standard		Quotas awarded	Qualified NOC
2027 Trampoline Gymnastics World Championships	Top 8 (max. 1 per NOC)		Up to 8	
2027–2028 Trampoline World Cup series	Up to 12 gymnasts qualified		Up to 12	
2028 Continental Championships	1 per continent	Africa	0 or 1	
2028 Continental Championships	1 per continent	Americas	0 or 1	
2028 Continental Championships	1 per continent	Asia	0 or 1	
2028 Continental Championships	1 per continent	Europe	0 or 1	
2028 Continental Championships	1 per continent	Oceania	0 or 1	
Reserved places	Host nation		1	[[]] (USA)
Reserved places	Tripartite invitation		0 or 1	
Total			16	
