= Cricket at the 2028 Summer Olympics – Women's qualification =

The cricket event at the 2028 Summer Olympics will be the second time that the sport will be played at the games. It was last played at the 1900 Summer Olympics. The tournament will be played in the Twenty20 (T20) format.

The qualification process for the women's tournament includes two routes, direct qualification via 2026 Women's T20 World Cup and the qualifier, with the qualification window being 30 June to 1 May 2027.

== Format ==
==== Direct qualification ====
The top four teams from each continent (Africa, Asia, Europe, and Oceania) in the 2026 Women's T20 World Cup qualified directly for the tournament. The host nation, the United States, is also eligible for a direct quota place, provided they reach the top 15 in the rankings at any time during the host ranking qualification window, from 30 June to 31 December 2026. If they do not, the highest ranked non-qualified nation will qualify instead.

==== Global qualifier ====
The next eight highest-ranked teams that have not already qualified directly will participate in the global qualifier to fill the remaining spot, with the qualification for the qualifier being open till 1 May 2027. If the West Indies finish among these eight teams, a regional tournament involving the West Indies nations will be held to determine the region's representative at the global qualifier.

== Qualified teams ==
Details of the teams qualified for the 2028 Summer Olympics
Means of qualification	Dates	Venue(s)	Berth(s)	Qualified teams
Hosts if in the top 15 ranked sides or Highest ranked side not already qualified	31 December 2026 or 31 March 2027	TBD	1	TBD
2026 Women's T20 World Cup (Top ranked team from each region)	12 June – 5 July 2026	England and Wales	4	Australia (Oceania)
2026 Women's T20 World Cup (Top ranked team from each region)	12 June – 5 July 2026	England and Wales	4	Great Britain (Europe; via England)
2026 Women's T20 World Cup (Top ranked team from each region)	12 June – 5 July 2026	England and Wales	4	India (Asia)
2026 Women's T20 World Cup (Top ranked team from each region)	12 June – 5 July 2026	England and Wales	4	South Africa (Africa)
Women's Qualifier	26 February – 5 March 2028	United States	1	TBD
Total			6	

== 2026 Women's T20 World Cup ==
Teams qualified for the tournament
Method of qualification	No. of teams	Teams	WT20I ranking (Note: The ICC Women's T20I Team Rankings as of 11 June 2026, before the start of the tournament.)
Host	1	England	2
2024 Women's T20 World Cup (Top 5 teams from the previous tournament, excluding hosts)	5	Australia	1
2024 Women's T20 World Cup (Top 5 teams from the previous tournament, excluding hosts)	5	India	3
2024 Women's T20 World Cup (Top 5 teams from the previous tournament, excluding hosts)	5	New Zealand	4
2024 Women's T20 World Cup (Top 5 teams from the previous tournament, excluding hosts)	5	South Africa	5
2024 Women's T20 World Cup (Top 5 teams from the previous tournament, excluding hosts)	5	West Indies	7
ICC Women's T20I Team Rankings	2	Pakistan	8
ICC Women's T20I Team Rankings	2	Sri Lanka	6
2026 Women's T20 World Cup Global Qualifier	4	Bangladesh	10
2026 Women's T20 World Cup Global Qualifier	4	Ireland	9
2026 Women's T20 World Cup Global Qualifier	4	Netherlands	14
2026 Women's T20 World Cup Global Qualifier	4	Scotland	11
Total	12		

==== Group A ====
Group A standings
Pos	Team	Pld	W	L	NR	Pts	NRR	Qualification
1	Australia	5	5	0	0	10	3.882	Advanced to the knockout stage
2	South Africa	5	4	1	0	8	0.633	Advanced to the knockout stage
3	India	5	3	2	0	6	1.718	Eliminated
4	Bangladesh	5	2	3	0	4	−0.710	Eliminated
5	Pakistan	5	1	4	0	2	−1.872	Eliminated
6	Netherlands	5	0	5	0	0	−3.276	Eliminated

Source: Cricinfo
Rules for classification: 1) Points; 2) Wins; 3) Net run rate; 4) Results of games between tied teams; 5) WT20I Rankings ahead of the tournament

==== Group B ====
Group B standings
Pos	Team	Pld	W	L	NR	Pts	NRR	Qualification
1	England (H)	5	5	0	0	10	2.134	Advanced to the knockout stage
2	West Indies	5	3	2	0	6	−0.147	Advanced to the knockout stage
3	Sri Lanka	5	3	2	0	6	−0.725	Eliminated
4	New Zealand	5	2	3	0	4	−0.118	Eliminated
5	Scotland	5	1	4	0	2	−0.232	Eliminated
6	Ireland	5	1	4	0	2	−0.875	Eliminated

Source: ESPNcricinfo
Rules for classification: 1) Points; 2) Wins; 3) Net run rate; 4) Results of games between tied teams; 5) WT20I Rankings ahead of the tournament
(H) Hosts

== 2028 Olympic Qualifier ==
Details of the teams qualified for the 2028 Olympic Qualifier
Means of qualification	Dates	Venue(s)	Berth(s)	Qualified teams
ICC Women's T20I Team Rankings (Top eight sides not already qualified)	1 May 2027	—N/a	8	To be determined
ICC Women's T20I Team Rankings (Top eight sides not already qualified)	1 May 2027	—N/a	8	To be determined
ICC Women's T20I Team Rankings (Top eight sides not already qualified)	1 May 2027	—N/a	8	To be determined
ICC Women's T20I Team Rankings (Top eight sides not already qualified)	1 May 2027	—N/a	8	To be determined
ICC Women's T20I Team Rankings (Top eight sides not already qualified)	1 May 2027	—N/a	8	To be determined
ICC Women's T20I Team Rankings (Top eight sides not already qualified)	1 May 2027	—N/a	8	To be determined
ICC Women's T20I Team Rankings (Top eight sides not already qualified)	1 May 2027	—N/a	8	To be determined
ICC Women's T20I Team Rankings (Top eight sides not already qualified)	1 May 2027	—N/a	8	To be determined
Total			8	

== See also ==
- Cricket at the 2028 Summer Olympics – Men's qualification
