= Cricket at the 2028 Summer Olympics =

International Twenty20 cricket tournament

Cricket at the Games of the XXXIV Olympiad
- Venue: Knight Riders Cricket Ground, Fairplex, Pomona, California, US
- Date: July 12–29, 2028
- Competitors: 180

Cricket will be reintroduced to the Olympic program at the 2028 Summer Olympics in Los Angeles, California, United States, after it was last contested at the 1900 Summer Olympics in Paris, France. It will be held in Twenty20 International (T20I) format.

It will feature six teams in each of the men's and women's tournaments. The matches will be held at the Knight Riders Cricket Ground in Fairplex, Pomona, California. The women's competition will be held from the 12th to the 20th of July and the men's competition from the 22nd to the 29th of July.

== Background ==
Cricket had a history in the early Olympics. In the first modern Summer Olympics in 1896 in Athens, it was planned to be played as a medal sport, but the planned event did not occur due to a lack of sufficient entries. In the subsequent 1900 Summer Olympics in Paris, four teams entered: Great Britain (listed as England in posters advertising it and represented by Devon & Somerset Wanderers), France, Belgium, and the Netherlands. However, eventually only two teams competed, and the only match played between Great Britain and France ended with Great Britain winning the two-day match. The players did not realize this was an Olympic event until it was retrospectively recognized as one in 1912. Cricket was initially included in the 1904 Summer Olympics but was cancelled shortly before the start of the Games. The sport was not included in the Olympic program for more than a century.

For several years, national cricket governing bodies, including the Board of Control for Cricket in India (BCCI) and the England and Wales Cricket Board (ECB), were opposed to the return of the sport to the Olympics. The sport was featured at the Commonwealth Games twice: a 50-over List A men's tournament at Kuala Lumpur in 1998 and a Women's Twenty20 International (WT20I) tournament held at Edgbaston Cricket Ground when Birmingham hosted in 2022. The ECB withdrew its opposition to the inclusion of the sport in the Olympic Program in 2015. In March 2017, the International Cricket Council's (ICC) then-chief Dave Richardson thought the "time is right" for Olympic cricket, and later the same year, it was reported in the media that the opposition of the BCCI had softened.

In October 2020, the USA Cricket stated that it saw the inclusion of cricket in the Olympics program for the 2028 Summer Olympics to be held in Los Angeles as one of its goals. In 2020, the BCCI backed the ICC's bid for inclusion of Twenty20 International (T20I) cricket for the 2028 Summer Olympics after certain clarifications from the International Olympic Committee (IOC). In August 2021, the ICC confirmed its plans to bid for the inclusion of cricket at the Olympics, starting with the 2028 Games.

On 9 October 2023, the 2028 Los Angeles Olympic Organizing Committee announced that cricket was on the list of sports they wished to introduce to the Games. On 13 October 2023, the IOC announced that the bid had been accepted and that it would be placed for voting during the 141st IOC Session in Mumbai to be held between 15 and 17 October 2023. On 16 October 2023, cricket was confirmed to be included in the 2028 Olympics Program.

== Format ==
In April 2025, IOC confirmed that both the men's and women's competitions would be held in the T20I format and will be competed among six teams each. Each nation will be allowed to have a maximum of 15 players in its squad after cricket was allocated 90 athletes per gender for the event.

Both men's and women's competition will see a first phase with the six teams split into two groups of three. The second phase will see teams play those in the opposite group who did not finish in the same position. Results from the four matches will be used to construct a final table where first and second will contest the gold medal match, and third and fourth will contest the bronze medal match.

== Schedule ==
The first version of the schedule was released in November 2025. The first match will be played on 12 July, and the Gold medal matches will be played on 20 and 29 July for the women's and men's tournaments respectively. The matches will have 9:00 and 18:30 PDT starts, allowing broadcasters to air them during Indian prime time (21:30 IST) and morning (7:00 IST) windows.

The women's competition is included in the 2025–2029 ICC Women's Future Tours Programme and the men's competition will be included in the next ICC Men's Future Tours Programme.

P	Preliminary Round	B	Bronze medal match	F	Gold medal match

Date Event	Wed 12	Thur 13	Fri 14	Sat 15	Sun 16	Mon 17	Tues 18	Wed 19	Thur 20		Fri 21	Sat 22	Sun 23	Mon 24	Tues 25	Wed 26	Thur 27	Fri 28	Sat 29
Men												P	P	P	P	P	P	B	F
Women	P	P		P	P	P	P	P	B	F									

== Qualification ==
In July 2025, ECB chief executive Richard Thompson stated that the qualification process had not been finalised but would be based on geography for both the men's and women's tournaments, with the aim of having one team from each of the five Olympic Ring areas (Europe, Asia, Oceania, Africa and the Americas) plus the United States as hosts. However, of the twelve ICC full members, three do not correspond directly to National Olympic Committees (NOCs): England, Ireland and the West Indies, the last of which has featured players from several Caribbean nations. In April 2025, the ECB and Cricket Scotland announced that discussions were underway to create a Great Britain Olympic cricket team for the Games.

On 29 June 2026, the ICC announced the qualification process for the Games. The top-ranked side from each of the continents (Africa, Asia, Europe, and Oceania) as per the ICC Men's T20I Team Rankings (on 31 December 2026) and the 2026 Women's T20 World Cup will qualify directly for the tournament. If the United States men's or women's team appears in the top 15 ranked sides of the relevant ICC T20I team rankings during the qualification period of 30 June 2026 to 31 December 2026, they will be allocated one quota place as hosts. The top eight sides in the respective rankings who had not already qualified will contest in Global Qualifier tournaments in 2027 for the final available spot(s). If the West Indies become one of the eligible teams, a preliminary Caribbean Qualifier tournament will be held to determine which nation would represent the team.

=== Qualification summary ===
Nation	Men's	Women's	Athletes
Australia	TBD	Yes	15
Great Britain	TBD	Yes	15
India	TBD	Yes	15
South Africa	TBD	Yes	15
United States	Yes	TBD	15
TBD			
Total: 5 NOCs	1/6	4/6	75/180

=== Men's qualification ===
Details of the teams qualified for the 2028 Summer Olympics
Means of qualification	Dates	Venue(s)	Berth(s)	Qualified
Host	30 June 2026	—N/a	1	United States
ICC Men's T20I Team Rankings (Highest ranked teams from Africa, Asia, Europe, and Oceania)	31 December 2026	—N/a	4	TBD
ICC Men's T20I Team Rankings (Highest ranked teams from Africa, Asia, Europe, and Oceania)	31 December 2026	—N/a	4	TBD
ICC Men's T20I Team Rankings (Highest ranked teams from Africa, Asia, Europe, and Oceania)	31 December 2026	—N/a	4	TBD
ICC Men's T20I Team Rankings (Highest ranked teams from Africa, Asia, Europe, and Oceania)	31 December 2026	—N/a	4	TBD
Men's Qualifier	2027	TBD	1	TBD
Total			6	

=== Women's qualification ===
Details of the teams qualified for the 2028 Summer Olympics
Means of qualification	Dates	Venue(s)	Berth(s)	Qualified
Hosts if in the top 15 ranked sides or Highest ranked side not already qualified	31 December 2026 or 31 March 2027	TBD	1/1	TBD
2026 Women's T20 World Cup (Top teams from each Africa, Asia, Europe, and Oceania)	12 June – 5 July 2026	England	4	Australia (Oceania)
2026 Women's T20 World Cup (Top teams from each Africa, Asia, Europe, and Oceania)	12 June – 5 July 2026	England	4	Great Britain (Europe; qualified via England)
2026 Women's T20 World Cup (Top teams from each Africa, Asia, Europe, and Oceania)	12 June – 5 July 2026	England	4	India (Asia)
2026 Women's T20 World Cup (Top teams from each Africa, Asia, Europe, and Oceania)	12 June – 5 July 2026	England	4	South Africa (Africa)
Women's Qualifier	2027	TBD	1/1	TBD
Total			6	

== Venue ==
Organizers considered holding the event in the Eastern United States in order to allow more favorable scheduling of matches for prime time viewership in India, but later decided to hold the event within Los Angeles County so that it will fall within the Games' main infrastructure. Plans were announced in April 2025 for a temporary stadium at the Fairplex in Pomona, California, but in August 2025 it was reported that the Fairplex was in discussions with Shah Rukh Khan's Knight Riders Group—owner of the Indian Premier League's Kolkata Knight Riders, and the sister Los Angeles Knight Riders in Major League Cricket—over a proposal to build a permanent facility instead. On March 19, 2026, the Knight Riders Group announced the $21 million Knight Riders Cricket Ground; the stadium was planned to be constructed in a modular fashion, and will be expanded to a capacity of 15,000 for the Olympics. The Knight Riders Cricket Ground opened in July 2026.

Venue in California state
A map of the California state, US with a pin-point on the 2028 Olympic cricket venue	Fairplex, Pomona
A map of the California state, US with a pin-point on the 2028 Olympic cricket venue	Knight Riders Cricket Ground
A map of the California state, US with a pin-point on the 2028 Olympic cricket venue	Capacity: 15,000
A map of the California state, US with a pin-point on the 2028 Olympic cricket venue	Matches: TBA

== Medalists ==
Event	Gold	Silver	Bronze
Men's tournament			
Women's tournament			
