= Great Britain at the 2028 Summer Olympics =

- Flag of the United Kingdom
- IOC code: GBR
- NOC: British Olympic Association
- Website: www.teamgb.com

in Los Angeles, United States 14 July 2028 – 30 July 2028
- Competitors: 24 in 2 sports
- Medals: Gold 0 Silver 0 Bronze 0 Total 0

Summer Olympics appearances (overview)
- 1896; 1900; 1904; 1908; 1912; 1920; 1924; 1928; 1932; 1936; 1948; 1952; 1956; 1960; 1964; 1968; 1972; 1976; 1980; 1984; 1988; 1992; 1996; 2000; 2004; 2008; 2012; 2016; 2020; 2024; 2028

Other related appearances
- 1906 Intercalated Games

Great Britain is scheduled to compete at the 2028 Summer Olympics in Los Angeles, from 14 to 30 July 2028. Great Britain has been represented at every edition of the modern Summer Olympic Games, and remains the only delegation to have secured at least one gold medal at every edition.

== Competitors ==
The following is the list of number of competitors in the Games.

Sport	Men	Women	Total
Cricket	0	15	15
Equestrian	0	0	9
Total	0	15	24

== Cricket ==
=== Women's tournament ===
Great Britain women's team earn a spot for the Olympics through England, after emerging as the highest-ranked eligible team from Europe at the 2026 Women's T20 World Cup in England and Wales.

== Equestrian ==
Great Britain qualified a full squad in dressage, eventing and jumping by claiming one of the available quotas in each event awarded to the highest-ranked eligible nations at the 2026 FEI World Championships in Aachen, Germany.

=== Dressage ===
Athlete	Horse	Event	Grand Prix		Grand Prix Special		Grand Prix Freestyle		Overall	
Athlete	Horse	Event	Score	Rank	Score	Rank	Technical	Artistic	Score	Rank
		Individual			—N/a					
	See above	Team								

!

=== Eventing ===
Athlete	Horse	Event	Dressage		Cross-country			Jumping						Total	
Athlete	Horse	Event	Dressage		Cross-country			Qualifier			Final			Total	
Athlete	Horse	Event	Penalties	Rank	Penalties	Total	Rank	Penalties	Total	Rank	Penalties	Total	Rank	Penalties	Rank
		Individual													
	See above	Team									—N/a				

=== Jumping ===
Athlete	Horse	Event	Qualification			Final			Jump-off		
Athlete	Horse	Event	Penalties	Time	Rank	Penalties	Time	Rank	Penalties	Time	Rank
		Individual									
	See above	Team							—N/a		

Qualification Legend: Q = Qualified for the final based on position in group; q = Qualified for the final based on overall position
