= New Zealand at the 2028 Summer Olympics =

- IOC code: NZL
- NOC: New Zealand Olympic Committee
- Website: www.olympic.org.nz

in Los Angeles, United States 14 July 2028 – 30 July 2028
- Competitors: 3 in 1 sport
- Medals: Gold 0 Silver 0 Bronze 0 Total 0

Summer Olympics appearances (overview)
- 1908; 1912; 1920; 1924; 1928; 1932; 1936; 1948; 1952; 1956; 1960; 1964; 1968; 1972; 1976; 1980; 1984; 1988; 1992; 1996; 2000; 2004; 2008; 2012; 2016; 2020; 2024; 2028

Other related appearances
- Australasia (1908–1912)

New Zealand is scheduled to compete at the 2028 Summer Olympics in Los Angeles from 14 to 30 July 2028. It will mark the nations twenty-sixth appearance as an independent nation, following its Olympic debut at the 1924 Summer Olympics in Paris and participation in every subsequent edition except the 1936 Summer Olympics in Berlin.

== Competitors ==
The following is the list of number of competitors in the Games.

| Sport | Men | Women | Total |
|---|---|---|---|
| Equestrian | 0 | 0 | 3 |
| Total | 0 | 0 | 3 |

== Equestrian ==
New Zealand secured a eventing squad berth by placing among one of the seven highest ranked nations at the 2026 FEI World Championships in Aachen, Germany.

=== Eventing ===
| Athlete | Horse | Event | Dressage | | Cross-country | | | Jumping | | | | | | Total | |
| Athlete | Horse | Event | Dressage | | Cross-country | | | Qualifier | | | Final | | | Total | |
| Athlete | Horse | Event | Penalties | Rank | Penalties | Total | Rank | Penalties | Total | Rank | Penalties | Total | Rank | Penalties | Rank |
|---|---|---|---|---|---|---|---|---|---|---|---|---|---|---|---|
| | | Individual | | | | | | | | | | | | | |
| | See above | Team | | | | | | | | | —N/a | | | | |

Qualification Legend: Q = Qualified for the final based on position in group; q = Qualified for the final based on overall position
