= 2028 ICC Men's Olympics Qualifier =

Olympic cricket qualification tournament

2028 Men's Cricket Olympic Qualifier
- Dates: 5 – 13 February 2028
- Administrator: International Cricket Council
- Cricket format: Twenty20
- Tournament format(s): Group stage and Final
- Host: Bangladesh
- Participants: 8
- Matches: 13

The 2028 Men's Cricket Olympic Qualifier will be a qualification tournament for the men's cricket event at the 2028 Summer Olympics. It will be held from 5 to 13 February 2028 in Bangladesh and will serve as the final process to determine the team that will advance to the main event in Los Angeles, California, United States.

== Background ==
In November 2026, the ICC announced the format for the tournament in which the next eight highest-ranked teams that have not already qualified directly will participate in the global qualifier to fill the remaining spot, with the qualification for the qualifier being open until 31 December 2026.

=== Format ===
The qualification process will determine the final six-team lineup, with five spots filled automatically by the host nation United States and the highest ranked teams from Africa, Asia, Europe, and Oceania. The final berth will decided through this tournament, where eight teams are split into two groups of four, with the winner from each group advancing to the final. The winner of the final qualifies for the main tournament in the United States.

== Qualification ==
If the West Indies finish among the eight teams in the rankings, a regional tournament involving the West Indies nations will be held to determine the region's representative at the global qualifier.

Details of the teams qualified for the 2028 Men's Cricket Olympic Qualifier
Means of qualification	Dates	Venue(s)	Berth(s)	Qualified teams
ICC Men's T20I Team Rankings (Top eight sides not already qualified)	31 December 2026	—N/a	8	To be determined
ICC Men's T20I Team Rankings (Top eight sides not already qualified)	31 December 2026	—N/a	8	To be determined
ICC Men's T20I Team Rankings (Top eight sides not already qualified)	31 December 2026	—N/a	8	To be determined
ICC Men's T20I Team Rankings (Top eight sides not already qualified)	31 December 2026	—N/a	8	To be determined
ICC Men's T20I Team Rankings (Top eight sides not already qualified)	31 December 2026	—N/a	8	To be determined
ICC Men's T20I Team Rankings (Top eight sides not already qualified)	31 December 2026	—N/a	8	To be determined
ICC Men's T20I Team Rankings (Top eight sides not already qualified)	31 December 2026	—N/a	8	To be determined
ICC Men's T20I Team Rankings (Top eight sides not already qualified)	31 December 2026	—N/a	8	To be determined
Total			8	

== Group stage ==
The 8 teams will be divided into two groups of four teams with the matches played in a single round-robin format. The group stage will feature a total of 12 matches.

Group A	Group B
(To be determined) TBD; (To be determined) TBD; (To be determined) TBD; (To be determined) TBD	(To be determined) TBD; (To be determined) TBD; (To be determined) TBD; (To be determined) TBD

=== Group A ===
Group A standings
Pos	Team	Pld	W	L	NR	Pts	NRR
1	(To be determined) TBD	0	0	0	0	0	—
2	(To be determined) TBD	0	0	0	0	0	—
3	(To be determined) TBD	0	0	0	0	0	—
4	(To be determined) TBD	0	0	0	0	0	—

First match(es) will be played: unknown. Source:

=== Group B ===
Group B standings
Pos	Team	Pld	W	L	NR	Pts	NRR
1	(To be determined) TBD	0	0	0	0	0	—
2	(To be determined) TBD	0	0	0	0	0	—
3	(To be determined) TBD	0	0	0	0	0	—
4	(To be determined) TBD	0	0	0	0	0	—

First match(es) will be played: unknown. Source:

== Final ==
13 February 2028

Winner of Group A	v	Winner of Group B
