= Equestrian events at the 2027 Pan American Games =

Equestrian events at the Pan American Games
- Venue: Club Militar La Molina
- Start date: July 23, 2027
- End date: August 8, 2027
- No. of events: 6 (6 open)
- Competitors: 150 from TBC nations

Equestrian competitions at the 2027 Pan American Games are scheduled to be held from July 23 to August 8, 2027. The venue for the competition is the Equestrian Club Militar La Molina in Lima, Peru. It will be at the same venue as the 2019 Pan American Games.

A total of 150 athletes are scheduled to compete in the three disciplines of dressage, eventing and jumping, each with an individual and team event.

All three disciplines will serve as qualifiers for the 2028 Summer Olympics in Los Angeles, United States.

== Qualification ==
A quota of up to 150 equestrian riders (44 dressage, 46 eventing and 60 show jumping) will be allowed to qualify. A maximum of 12 athletes can compete for a nation across all events (with a maximum of four per discipline). Athletes qualified through various qualifying events and rankings.

=== Medalists ===
| Event | Gold | Silver | Bronze |
|---|---|---|---|
| Individual dressage | | | |
| Team dressage | | | |
| Individual eventing | | | |
| Team eventing | | | |
| Individual jumping | | | |
| Team jumping | | | |

== See also ==
- Equestrian events at the 2028 Summer Olympics
