= Australia at the 2028 Summer Olympics =

- IOC code: AUS
- NOC: Australian Olympic Committee
- Website: www.olympics.com.au

in Los Angeles, United States 14 July 2028 – 30 July 2028
- Competitors: 23 in 4 sports
- Medals: Gold 0 Silver 0 Bronze 0 Total 0

Summer Olympics appearances (overview)
- 1896; 1900; 1904; 1908; 1912; 1920; 1924; 1928; 1932; 1936; 1948; 1952; 1956; 1960; 1964; 1968; 1972; 1976; 1980; 1984; 1988; 1992; 1996; 2000; 2004; 2008; 2012; 2016; 2020; 2024; 2028

Other related appearances
- 1906 Intercalated Games –––– Australasia (1908–1912)

Australia will compete at the 2028 Summer Olympics in Los Angeles from 14 to 30 July 2028. As Brisbane will host the 2032 Summer Olympics an Australian segment will be performed at the Closing Cermonies.

== Competitors ==
The following is the list of number of competitors in the Games.

Sport	Men	Women	Total
Cricket	0	15	15
Equestrian	0	0	3
Surfing	0	1	1
Volleyball	2	2	4
Total	2	18	23

== Cricket ==
=== Women's tournament ===
Australia women's national cricket team qualified for the Olympics by finishing as the top ranked Oceania team at the 2026 Women's T20 World Cup.

== Equestrian ==
Australia secured qualification for a dressage squad by emerging as the highest-ranked eligible nation in Group G (South East Asia & Oceania) at the 2026 FEI World Championships in Aachen, Germany.

=== Dressage ===
Athlete	Horse	Event	Grand Prix		Grand Prix Special		Grand Prix Freestyle		Overall	
Athlete	Horse	Event	Score	Rank	Score	Rank	Technical	Artistic	Score	Rank
		Individual			—N/a					
	See above	Team								

Qualification Legend: Q = Qualified for the final based on position in group; q = Qualified for the final based on overall position

== Volleyball ==
=== Beach ===
Australian pairs secured qualification for the men's and women's events by winning gold and claiming the only available quota in their respective events, awarded at the 2026 Asian Beach Volleyball Championships in Shangluo, China.

Athletes	Event	Preliminary round				Round of 16	Quarterfinal	Semifinal	Final / BM	
Athletes	Event	Opposition Score	Opposition Score	Opposition Score	Rank	Opposition Score	Opposition Score	Opposition Score	Opposition Score	Rank
	Men's									
	Women's									
