= Netherlands at the 2028 Summer Olympics =

- Flag of the Netherlands
- IOC code: NED
- NOC: Dutch Olympic Committee*; Dutch Sports Federation
- Website: www.nocnsf.nl (in Dutch)

in Los Angeles, United States 14 July 2028 – 30 July 2028
- Competitors: 21 in 3 sports
- Medals: Gold 0 Silver 0 Bronze 0 Total 0

Summer Olympics appearances (overview)
- 1900; 1904; 1908; 1912; 1920; 1924; 1928; 1932; 1936; 1948; 1952; 1956; 1960; 1964; 1968; 1972; 1976; 1980; 1984; 1988; 1992; 1996; 2000; 2004; 2008; 2012; 2016; 2020; 2024; 2028

Other related appearances
- 1906 Intercalated Games

The Netherlands will compete at the 2028 Summer Olympics in Los Angeles from 14 July to 30 July 2028. Dutch athletes have appeared in every edition of the Summer Olympic Games, with the exception of the sparsely attended 1904 Summer Olympics in St. Louis and 1956 Summer Olympics in Melbourne (except the equestrian events in Stockholm), which the Netherlands boycotted because of the Soviet invasion of Hungary.

== Competitors ==
The following is the list of number of competitors in the Games.

Sport	Men	Women	Total
Equestrian	0	0	3
Field hockey	0	16	16
Volleyball	0	2	2
Total	0	18	21

== Equestrian ==
The Netherlands qualified a dressage squad by claiming the fifth of sixth available quotas awarded to highest-ranked eligible nations in the dressage team event at the 2026 FEI World Championships in Aachen, Germany.

=== Dressage ===
Athlete	Horse	Event	Grand Prix		Grand Prix Special		Grand Prix Freestyle		Overall	
Athlete	Horse	Event	Score	Rank	Score	Rank	Technical	Artistic	Score	Rank
		Individual			—N/a					
	See above	Team								

Qualification Legend: Q = Qualified for the final based on position in group; q = Qualified for the final based on overall position

== Field hockey ==
Summary

Key:

- FT – After full-time.
- P – Match decided by penalty-shootout.

Team	Event	Group stage						Quarterfinal	Semifinal	Final / BM	
Team	Event	Opposition Score	Opposition Score	Opposition Score	Opposition Score	Opposition Score	Rank	Opposition Score	Opposition Score	Opposition Score	Rank
Netherlands women's	Women's tournament										

=== Women's tournament ===
Netherlands women's national field hockey team qualified for the Olympics by winning the International Hockey Federation's 2025–26 Women's FIH Pro League.

== Volleyball ==
=== Beach ===
The Netherlands women's pairs qualified for the Los Angeles Olympic Games after winning the gold medal and securing the sole women's pairs quota at the 2026 European Beach Volleyball Championships in Stare Jabłonki, Poland.

Athletes	Event	Preliminary round				Round of 16	Quarterfinal	Semifinal	Final / BM	
Athletes	Event	Opposition Score	Opposition Score	Opposition Score	Rank	Opposition Score	Opposition Score	Opposition Score	Opposition Score	Rank
	Women's									
