= Ireland at the 2028 Summer Olympics =

- IOC code: IRL
- NOC: Olympic Federation of Ireland
- Website: olympics.ie

in Los Angeles, United States 14 July 2028 – 30 July 2028
- Competitors: 6 in 1 sport
- Medals: Gold 0 Silver 0 Bronze 0 Total 0

Summer Olympics appearances (overview)
- 1924; 1928; 1932; 1936; 1948; 1952; 1956; 1960; 1964; 1968; 1972; 1976; 1980; 1984; 1988; 1992; 1996; 2000; 2004; 2008; 2012; 2016; 2020; 2024; 2028

Other related appearances
- Great Britain (1896–1920)

Ireland is scheduled to compete at the 2028 Summer Olympics in Los Angeles, from 14 to 30 July 2028. Irish athletes have participated in every edition of the modern Summer Olympics, either representing Ireland independently or competing as part of the Great Britain and Ireland team prior to 1924, with the sole exception of the 1936 Summer Olympics in Berlin.

== Competitors ==
The following is the list of number of competitors in the Games.

Sport	Men	Women	Total
Equestrian	0	0	6
Total	0	0	6

== Equestrian ==
Ireland secured a eventing and jumping squads quota by finishing in the seven in the team events, consequently obtaining one of the seven available quota spots allocated to the highest-ranked eligible nations at the 2026 FEI World Championships in Aachen, Germany.

=== Eventing ===
Athlete	Horse	Event	Dressage		Cross-country			Jumping						Total	
Athlete	Horse	Event	Dressage		Cross-country			Qualifier			Final			Total	
Athlete	Horse	Event	Penalties	Rank	Penalties	Total	Rank	Penalties	Total	Rank	Penalties	Total	Rank	Penalties	Rank
		Individual													
	See above	Team									—N/a				

=== Jumping ===
Athlete	Horse	Event	Qualification			Final			Jump-off		
Athlete	Horse	Event	Penalties	Time	Rank	Penalties	Time	Rank	Penalties	Time	Rank
		Individual									
	See above	Team							—N/a		

Qualification Legend: Q = Qualified for the final based on position in group; q = Qualified for the final based on overall position
