= Cricket at the 2028 Summer Olympics – Men's qualification =

The cricket event at the 2028 Summer Olympics will be the second time that the sport will be played at the games. It was last played at the 1900 Summer Olympics. It will be played in the Twenty20 (T20) format.

The qualification process for the men's tournament includes two routes, direct qualification via rankings and the qualifier, with the qualification window being 30 June to 31 December 2026.

== Format ==
==== Direct qualification ====
The top four teams from each continent (Africa, Asia, Europe, and Oceania) in the ICC Men's T20I Team Rankings as of the cutoff date of 31 December 2026 qualify directly for the tournament. The host nation, the United States, were also eligible for direct quota place, provided they reach the top 15 in the rankings during the qualification window from 30 June to 31 December 2026.

==== Global qualifier ====
The next eight highest-ranked teams that have not already qualified directly will participate in the global qualifier to fill the remaining spot, with the qualification for the qualifier being open till 31 December 2026. If the West Indies finish among these eight teams, a regional tournament involving the West Indies nations will be held to determine the region's representative at the global qualifier.

== Qualified teams ==
Details of the teams qualified for the 2028 Summer Olympics
Means of qualification	Dates	Venue(s)	Berth(s)	Qualified
Host	30 June 2026	—N/a	1	United States
ICC Men's T20I Team Rankings (Highest ranked teams from Africa, Asia, Europe, and Oceania)	31 December 2026	—N/a	4	TBD
ICC Men's T20I Team Rankings (Highest ranked teams from Africa, Asia, Europe, and Oceania)	31 December 2026	—N/a	4	TBD
ICC Men's T20I Team Rankings (Highest ranked teams from Africa, Asia, Europe, and Oceania)	31 December 2026	—N/a	4	TBD
ICC Men's T20I Team Rankings (Highest ranked teams from Africa, Asia, Europe, and Oceania)	31 December 2026	—N/a	4	TBD
Men's Qualifier	5 – 13 February 2028	Bangladesh	1	TBD
Total			6	

== ICC T20I Team Rankings ==
United States qualified directly by virtue of being hosts and reaching the top 15 of the rankings within the host ranking qualification window, having ranked 13th as of 26 July 2026.

ICC Men's T20I Team Rankings
Team	Matches	Points	Rating
England (Note: If England qualify, they will represent Great Britain at the Olympic tournament, with players from Scotland also eligible for selection, in accordance with Olympic regulations.)	41	11,021	269
India	76	20,268	267
Australia	38	9,868	260
New Zealand	55	13,638	248
South Africa	53	12,881	243
Pakistan	62	14,883	240
West Indies (Note: One of the member states and dependencies from the West Indies cricket team will be representing the region at the Olympic qualifier if the West Indies are in the top 8 of the rankings of the teams yet to qualify at the end ranking qualification window.)	60	14,155	236
Bangladesh	55	12,220	222
Sri Lanka	52	11,489	221
Afghanistan	44	9,679	220
Ireland (Note: The Ireland men's cricket team represents the island of Ireland. Players from Northern Ireland are technically eligible to represent either the Ireland Olympic Team or the Great Britain Olympic Team in all sports. The Great Britain team is organised by the England and Wales Cricket Board and Cricket Scotland.)	29	5,942	205
Zimbabwe	62	12,417	200
United States	20	3,650	183
Nepal	44	7,968	181
Netherlands	24	4,311	180
Namibia	41	7,358	179
Source: ICC Men's T20I Team Rankings, 16 November 2026

Qualified for the 2028 Summer Olympics as host having reached the top 15 in the rankings within the qualification window
Eligible to qualify for the 2028 Summer Olympics from their respective continents (Africa, Asia, Europe, and Oceania)
Eligible to advance to the Olympic Qualifier

== 2028 Olympic Qualifier ==
Details of the teams qualified for the 2027 Olympic Qualifier
Means of qualification	Dates	Venue(s)	Berth(s)	Qualified teams
ICC Men's T20I Team Rankings (Top eight sides not already qualified)	31 December 2026	—N/a	8	To be determined
ICC Men's T20I Team Rankings (Top eight sides not already qualified)	31 December 2026	—N/a	8	To be determined
ICC Men's T20I Team Rankings (Top eight sides not already qualified)	31 December 2026	—N/a	8	To be determined
ICC Men's T20I Team Rankings (Top eight sides not already qualified)	31 December 2026	—N/a	8	To be determined
ICC Men's T20I Team Rankings (Top eight sides not already qualified)	31 December 2026	—N/a	8	To be determined
ICC Men's T20I Team Rankings (Top eight sides not already qualified)	31 December 2026	—N/a	8	To be determined
ICC Men's T20I Team Rankings (Top eight sides not already qualified)	31 December 2026	—N/a	8	To be determined
ICC Men's T20I Team Rankings (Top eight sides not already qualified)	31 December 2026	—N/a	8	To be determined
Total			8	

== See also ==
- Cricket at the 2028 Summer Olympics – Women's qualification
