= Denmark at the 2028 Summer Olympics =

- IOC code: DEN
- NOC: National Olympic Committee and Sports Confederation of Denmark
- Website: www.dif.dk (in Danish and English)

in Los Angeles, United States 14 July 2028 – 30 July 2028
- Competitors: 4 in 2 sports
- Medals: Gold 0 Silver 0 Bronze 0 Total 0

Summer Olympics appearances (overview)
- 1896; 1900; 1904; 1908; 1912; 1920; 1924; 1928; 1932; 1936; 1948; 1952; 1956; 1960; 1964; 1968; 1972; 1976; 1980; 1984; 1988; 1992; 1996; 2000; 2004; 2008; 2012; 2016; 2020; 2024; 2028

Other related appearances
- 1906 Intercalated Games

Denmark is scheduled to compete at the 2028 Summer Olympics in Los Angeles, from 14 to 30 July 2028. Danish athletes have been represented at every edition of the Summer Olympic Games, with the sole exception of the 1904 Games in St. Louis.

== Competitors ==
The following is the list of number of competitors in the Games.

Sport	Men	Women	Total
Equestrian	0	0	3
Shooting	1	0	1
Total	1	0	4

== Equestrian ==
Denmark secured a place for a dressage squad by claiming the third available quotas awarded to the highest-ranked eligible nations after winning the bronze medal in the team event at the 2026 FEI World Championships in Aachen, Germany.

=== Dressage ===
Athlete	Horse	Event	Grand Prix		Grand Prix Special		Grand Prix Freestyle		Overall	
Athlete	Horse	Event	Score	Rank	Score	Rank	Technical	Artistic	Score	Rank
		Individual			—N/a					
	See above	Team								

Qualification Legend: Q = Qualified for the final based on position in group; q = Qualified for the final based on overall position

== Shooting ==
Danish athletes secured appearances by winning medals at the 2026 World Shooting Championships in Doha, Qatar.

Men

Athlete	Event	Qualification		Final	
Athlete	Event	Points	Rank	Points	Rank
Jesper Hansen	Skeet				
