= Belgium at the 2028 Summer Olympics =

- IOC code: BEL
- NOC: Belgian Olympic and Interfederal Committee
- Website: www.teambelgium.be (in Dutch and French)

in Los Angeles, United States 14 July 2028 – 30 July 2028
- Competitors: 25 in 2 sports
- Medals: Gold 0 Silver 0 Bronze 0 Total 0

Summer Olympics appearances (overview)
- 1900; 1904; 1908; 1912; 1920; 1924; 1928; 1932; 1936; 1948; 1952; 1956; 1960; 1964; 1968; 1972; 1976; 1980; 1984; 1988; 1992; 1996; 2000; 2004; 2008; 2012; 2016; 2020; 2024; 2028

Other related appearances
- 1906 Intercalated Games

Belgium will compete at the 2028 Summer Olympics in Los Angeles from 14 July to 30 July 2028. Since the country's debut in 1900, Belgian athletes have appeared in every edition of the Summer Olympic Games except for the 1904 edition.

== Competitors ==
The following is the list of number of competitors in the Games.

Sport	Men	Women	Total
Equestrian	0	0	9
Field hockey	16	0	16
Total	16	0	25

== Equestrian ==
Belgium entered a full squad of equestrian riders to the dressage, eventing and jumping competitions securing a team quota by finishing in the top six (team dressage) resp. top seven (team eventing and team jumping) highest ranked teams, excluding the host country USA, at the 2026 FEI World Championships in Aachen, Germany in August 2026.

=== Dressage ===
Athlete	Horse	Event	Grand Prix		Grand Prix Special		Grand Prix Freestyle	
Athlete	Horse	Event	Score	Rank	Score	Rank	Score	Rank
		Individual			—N/a			
	See above	Team					—N/a	

=== Eventing ===
Athlete	Horse	Event	Dressage		Cross-country			Jumping						Total	
Athlete	Horse	Event	Dressage		Cross-country			Qualifier			Final			Total	
Athlete	Horse	Event	Penalties	Rank	Penalties	Total	Rank	Penalties	Total	Rank	Penalties	Total	Rank	Penalties	Rank
		Individual													
	See above	Team									—N/a				

=== Jumping ===
Athlete	Horse	Event	Qualification			Final			Jump-off		
Athlete	Horse	Event	Penalties	Time	Rank	Penalties	Time	Rank	Penalties	Time	Rank
		Individual									
	See above	Team							—N/a		

Qualification Legend: Q = Qualified for the final based on position in group; q = Qualified for the final based on overall position

== Field hockey ==
Summary

Key:

- FT – After full-time.
- P – Match decided by penalty-shootout.

Team	Event	Group stage						Quarterfinal	Semifinal	Final / BM	
Team	Event	Opposition Score	Opposition Score	Opposition Score	Opposition Score	Opposition Score	Rank	Opposition Score	Opposition Score	Opposition Score	Rank
Belgium men's	Men's tournament										

=== Men's tournament ===
Belgium men's national field hockey team qualified for the Olympics by winning the International Hockey Federation's 2025–26 Men's FIH Pro League.
