= Sweden at the 2028 Summer Olympics =

- IOC code: SWE
- NOC: Swedish Olympic Committee
- Website: www.sok.se (in Swedish and English)

in Los Angeles, United States 14 July 2028 – 30 July 2028
- Competitors: 8 in 2 sports
- Medals: Gold 0 Silver 0 Bronze 0 Total 0

Summer Olympics appearances (overview)
- 1896; 1900; 1904; 1908; 1912; 1920; 1924; 1928; 1932; 1936; 1948; 1952; 1956; 1960; 1964; 1968; 1972; 1976; 1980; 1984; 1988; 1992; 1996; 2000; 2004; 2008; 2012; 2016; 2020; 2024; 2028

Other related appearances
- 1906 Intercalated Games

Sweden is scheduled to compete at the 2028 Summer Olympics in Los Angeles, from 14 to 30 July 2028. Sweden has been represented at every edition of the Summer Olympic Games, with the sole exception of the 1904 games.

== Competitors ==
The following is the list of number of competitors in the Games.

Sport	Men	Women	Total
Equestrian	0	0	6
Volleyball	2	0	2
Total	2	0	8

== Equestrian ==
Sweden qualified a dressage and eventing squad by claiming the available quotas awarded in the respective team event at the 2026 FEI World Championships in Aachen, Germany.

=== Dressage ===
Athlete	Horse	Event	Grand Prix		Grand Prix Special		Grand Prix Freestyle		Overall	
Athlete	Horse	Event	Score	Rank	Score	Rank	Technical	Artistic	Score	Rank
		Individual			—N/a					
	See above	Team								

=== Eventing ===
Athlete	Horse	Event	Dressage		Cross-country			Jumping						Total	
Athlete	Horse	Event	Dressage		Cross-country			Qualifier			Final			Total	
Athlete	Horse	Event	Penalties	Rank	Penalties	Total	Rank	Penalties	Total	Rank	Penalties	Total	Rank	Penalties	Rank
		Individual													
	See above	Team									—N/a				

Qualification Legend: Q = Qualified for the final based on position in group; q = Qualified for the final based on overall position

== Volleyball ==
=== Beach ===
Sweden men's pairs qualified for the games after winning the gold medal, thereby obtaing the only men's pairs berth awarded at the 2026 European Beach Volleyball Championships in Stare Jabłonki, Poland.

Athletes	Event	Preliminary round				Round of 16	Quarterfinal	Semifinal	Final / BM	
Athletes	Event	Opposition Score	Opposition Score	Opposition Score	Rank	Opposition Score	Opposition Score	Opposition Score	Opposition Score	Rank
	Men's									
