= Germany at the 2028 Summer Olympics =

- IOC code: GER
- NOC: German Olympic Sports Confederation
- Website: www.dosb.de (in German, English, and French)

in Los Angeles, United States 14 July 2028 – 30 August 2028
- Competitors: 11 in 3 sports
- Medals: Gold 0 Silver 0 Bronze 0 Total 0

Summer Olympics appearances (overview)
- 1896; 1900; 1904; 1908; 1912; 1920–1924; 1928; 1932; 1936; 1948; 1952; 1956–1988; 1992; 1996; 2000; 2004; 2008; 2012; 2016; 2020; 2024; 2028

Other related appearances
- 1906 Intercalated Games –––– Saar (1952); United Team of Germany (1956–1964); East Germany (1968–1988); West Germany (1968–1988)

Germany is scheduled to compete at the 2028 Summer Olympics in Los Angeles, from 14 to 30 July 2028. The nations participation in the Summer Olympics has been interrupted on several occasions, including the 1920 and following the World War I, the 1984 Games after the World War II and the 1980 and 1984 Games due to the respective American- and Soviet-led boycott. From 1956 to 1964, German athletes competed as the United Team of Germany before competing separately as West and East Germany from 1968 to 1988, with a unified German team returning at the 1992 Games following reunification in 1990.

== Competitors ==
The following is the list of number of competitors in the Games.

Sport	Men	Women	Total
Equestrian	0	0	9
Gymnastics	0	1	1
Shooting	1	0	1
Total	1	1	11

== Equestrian ==
Germany fielded a full squad qualification in all event, by winning the medal in the team event at the 2026 FEI World Championships in Aachen, consequently obtaining one of the six available quotas allocated to the highest-ranked eligible nations in the respective event.

=== Dressage ===
Athlete	Horse	Event	Grand Prix		Grand Prix Special		Grand Prix Freestyle		Overall	
Athlete	Horse	Event	Score	Rank	Score	Rank	Technical	Artistic	Score	Rank
		Individual			—N/a					
	See above	Team								

=== Eventing ===
Athlete	Horse	Event	Dressage		Cross-country			Jumping						Total	
Athlete	Horse	Event	Dressage		Cross-country			Qualifier			Final			Total	
Athlete	Horse	Event	Penalties	Rank	Penalties	Total	Rank	Penalties	Total	Rank	Penalties	Total	Rank	Penalties	Rank
		Individual													
	See above	Team									—N/a				

=== Jumping ===
Athlete	Horse	Event	Qualification			Final			Jump-off		
Athlete	Horse	Event	Penalties	Time	Rank	Penalties	Time	Rank	Penalties	Time	Rank
		Individual									
	See above	Team							—N/a		

Qualification Legend: Q = Qualified for the final based on position in group; q = Qualified for the final based on overall position

== Gymnastics ==
=== Rhythmic ===
Germany secured an individual qualification spot by winning the individual all-around gold medal at the 2026 Rhythmic Gymnastics World Championships in Frankfurt, thereby claiming one of the three qualification quotas awarded at the event.

Athlete	Event	Qualification						Final					
Athlete	Event	Hoop	Ball	Clubs	Ribbon	Total	Rank	Hoop	Ball	Clubs	Ribbon	Total	Rank
	Individual												

== Shooting ==
German shooter Florian Peter secure his appearance by winning gold medal in 25 metre rapid fire pistol at the 2026 World Championship in Doha, Qatar.

Men

Athlete	Event	Qualification		Final	
Athlete	Event	Points	Rank	Points	Rank
Florian Peter	25 metre rapid fire pistol				
