= 2027 FEI European Dressage Championships =

Sports season

2027 FEI Dressage, Para Dressage and U25 Dressage European Championships
- Host city: Vejle, Denmark
- Date(s): 18-22 August 2027
- Level: Senior, Para, Under 25
- Events: 21

The 2027 FEI Dressage, Para Dressage and U25 Dressage European Championships will be held in Vejle, Denmark, from 18 to 22 August 2027.

It will host the European Championships for Dressage (seniors), Para-Dressage and for Grand Prix riders under the age of 25. It will not be the first time Denmark hosting the European Dressage Championships, with the 2013 European Dressage Championships as most recent Championship. Denmark was also host of the first ever European Dressage Championship in 1963 and two years later in 1965, both in the country's capital Copenhagen. The Championship returned in 1979 to Aarhus and in 1985 back in Copenhagen. The 2027 European Championships will be held at the former Blue Hors Stables, now known as Randbøl Dressage Academy. The venue has hosted several international dressage competitions and breeding shows.

It will also serve as qualification event for the 2028 Olympic Games in Los Angeles, United States.

== Competition format ==
The team and individual dressage competitions used the same results. Dressage, Para-Dressage and U25 will consist of three phases. The first phase was the Grand Prix. Top 30 individuals advanced to the second phase, the Grand Prix Special where the first individual medals were awarded. The last set of medals at the 2027 European Dressage Championships was awarded after the third phase, the Grand Prix Freestyle where top 18 combinations competed. Only three riders per country are allowed to compete in the final Freestyle. If a country has four riders qualified for the Freestyle, only the best three are able to ride the Freestyle, and the remaining place(s) moves to the next combination(s) in line.

== Medals ==
=== Dressage ===
Event	Gold	Silver	Bronze
Freestyle dressage Details			
Special dressage Details			
Team			

==== Under 25 ====
Event	Gold	Silver	Bronze
Freestyle U25 dressage Details			
Individual U25 dressage Details			
Team			

=== Para-Dressage ===
Event	Gold	Silver	Bronze
Individual test grade I			
Individual test grade II			
Individual test grade III			
Individual test grade IV			
Individual test grade V			
Individual test grade I			
Individual test grade II			
Individual test grade III			
Individual test grade IV			
Individual test grade V			
Team para-dressage			
