= Spain at the 2028 Summer Olympics =

- IOC code: ESP
- NOC: Spanish Olympic Committee
- Website: www.coe.es (in Spanish)

in Los Angeles, United States 14 July 2028 – 30 July 2028
- Competitors: 5 in 1 sport
- Medals: Gold 0 Silver 0 Bronze 0 Total 0

Summer Olympics appearances (overview)
- 1900; 1904–1912; 1920; 1924; 1928; 1932; 1936; 1948; 1952; 1956; 1960; 1964; 1968; 1972; 1976; 1980; 1984; 1988; 1992; 1996; 2000; 2004; 2008; 2012; 2016; 2020; 2024; 2028

Spain will compete at the 2028 Summer Olympics in Los Angeles from 14 July to 30 July 2028. Spanish athletes have appeared in every edition of the Summer Olympic Games from 1920 onwards, except for the 1936 Summer Olympics in Nazi Germany because the nation's government was part of the anti-fascist boycott.

== Competitors ==
The following is the provisional list of number of competitors in the Games.

Sport	Men	Women	Total
Gymnastics	0	5	5
Total	0	5	5

== Gymnastics ==
=== Rhythmic ===
Spain entered a squad of rhythmic gymnasts to compete in the group all-around competition, following the nation's victory in the qualifying round at the 2026 World Championships in Frankfurt, Germany.

Athletes	Event	Qualification				Final			
Athletes	Event	5 apps	3+2 apps	Total	Rank	5 apps.	3+2 apps	Total	Rank
	Group								
