= Italy at the 2028 Summer Olympics =

- IOC code: ITA
- NOC: Italian National Olympic Committee
- Website: www.coni.it (in Italian)

in Los Angeles, United States 14 July 2028 – 30 July 2028
- Competitors: 15 in 4 sports
- Medals: Gold 0 Silver 0 Bronze 0 Total 0

Summer Olympics appearances (overview)
- 1896; 1900; 1904; 1908; 1912; 1920; 1924; 1928; 1932; 1936; 1948; 1952; 1956; 1960; 1964; 1968; 1972; 1976; 1980; 1984; 1988; 1992; 1996; 2000; 2004; 2008; 2012; 2016; 2020; 2024; 2028

Other related appearances
- 1906 Intercalated Games

Italy is scheduled to compete at the 2028 Summer Olympics in Los Angeles, from 14 to 30 July 2028. Italy has been represented at every edition of the modern Summer Olympic Games since 1896, although its participation at the 1904 remains subject to historical dispute due to the contested nationality of Italian cyclist Frank Bizzoni.

== Competitors ==
The following is the list of number of competitors in the Games.

Sport	Men	Women	Total
Equestrian	0	0	3
Flag football	10	0	10
Gymnastics	0	1	1
Shooting	0	1	1
Total	10	2	15

== Equestrian ==
Italy secured a qualification in jumping event by claiming one of the available quotas awarded to the highest-ranked eligible nations at the 2026 FEI World Championships in Aachen, Germany.

=== Jumping ===
Athlete	Horse	Event	Qualification			Final			Jump-off		
Athlete	Horse	Event	Penalties	Time	Rank	Penalties	Time	Rank	Penalties	Time	Rank
		Individual									
	See above	Team							—N/a		

Qualification Legend: Q = Qualified for the final based on position in group; q = Qualified for the final based on overall position

== Flag football ==
Italian flag football squad secured qualification spot in the men's team event by ranking among the two highest-placed eligible teams at the 2026 IFAF Men's Flag Football World Championship in Düsseldorf, Germany.

== Gymnastics ==
=== Rhythmic ===
Italy secured an individual rhythmic gymnastics qualification spot by claiming the last available spot for individual all-around at the 2026 Rhythmic Gymnastics World Championships in Frankfurt, Germany.

Athlete	Event	Qualification						Final					
Athlete	Event	Hoop	Ball	Clubs	Ribbon	Total	Rank	Hoop	Ball	Clubs	Ribbon	Total	Rank
	Individual												

== Shooting ==
Italian shootes secured appearances by winning medals at the 2026 World Shooting Championships in Doha, Qatar.

Women

Athlete	Event	Qualification		Final	
Athlete	Event	Points	Rank	Points	Rank
Jessica Rossi	Trap				
