= United States at the 2028 Summer Olympics =

- Flag of the United States
- IOC code: USA
- NOC: United States Olympic & Paralympic Committee
- Website: www.teamusa.org

in Los Angeles, United States July 14, 2028 – July 30, 2028
- Competitors: 343 in 32 sports
- Medals: Gold 0 Silver 0 Bronze 0 Total 0

Summer Olympics appearances (overview)
- 1896; 1900; 1904; 1908; 1912; 1920; 1924; 1928; 1932; 1936; 1948; 1952; 1956; 1960; 1964; 1968; 1972; 1976; 1980; 1984; 1988; 1992; 1996; 2000; 2004; 2008; 2012; 2016; 2020; 2024; 2028

Other related appearances
- 1906 Intercalated Games

The United States of America (USA), represented by the United States Olympic & Paralympic Committee (USOPC), will be the host nation of the 2028 Summer Olympics in Los Angeles from July 14 to 30, 2028.

== Background ==
On 26 April 2014, the Southern California Committee for the Olympic Games announced its bid proposal for the 2024 Olympics. On 28 July 2015, the USOC contacted Los Angeles about stepping in as a replacement bidder for the 2024 Summer Games after Boston dropped its bid. On 1 September 2015, the LA City Council voted 15–0 to support a bid for the 2024 Summer Olympics. The U.S. Olympic Committee finalised its selection moments after the LA City Council's vote. On 13 January 2016, Los Angeles 2024 committee officials said they were "thrilled to welcome" the construction of a $2-billion-plus, state-of-the-art football stadium in Inglewood, California and believed the arrival of one—and perhaps two—NFL teams would bolster its chances. On 25 January 2016, the Los Angeles 2024 committee announced that it planned to place its Olympic Village on the UCLA campus. LA 2024 also announced that media members and some Olympic officials would be housed in a 15-acre residential complex USC planned to build.

On 16 February 2016, LA 2024 unveiled a new logo and its slogan, "Follow the sun." On 23 February 2016, more than 88% of Angelenos were in favor of the city's hosting the 2024 Olympic and Paralympic Games bid, according to a survey conducted by Loyola Marymount University. On 10 March 2016, Los Angeles officials bidding for the 2024 Summer Olympics turned their focus to temporary facilities that might be needed. Current plans include an elevated track built over the football field at the Los Angeles Memorial Coliseum and a proposal to temporarily convert Figueroa Street into a miles-long promenade for pedestrians and bicyclists.

On 2 June 2016, the IOC confirmed that Los Angeles would proceed to the second stage of bidding for the 2024 Summer Games. On 29 July 2016, LA 2024 officials released artist renderings of an updated Los Angeles Memorial Coliseum and temporary swim stadium that would be used if Los Angeles is awarded the 2024 Summer Olympics.

On 31 July 2016, Mayor Eric Garcetti led a 25-person contingent from Los Angeles to Rio de Janeiro to promote their city's bid for the 2024 Summer Olympics. On 7 September 2016, LA 2024 planned to send a 16-person delegation to the 2016 Paralympics in Rio de Janeiro as part of its ongoing campaign to bring the Olympics back to Southern California.

On 13 September 2016, the LA 2024 bid committee released a two-minute video featuring a montage of local scenes narrated by children talking about their "dream city". On 23 September 2016, LA 2024 agreed to terms with the U.S. Olympic Committee on a required but controversial marketing arrangement. The Joint Marketing Program Agreement outlines shared responsibilities—and shared income—between Los Angeles and the USOC. On 7 October 2016, LA 2024 officials again made adjustments to their proposal for the 2024 Summer Olympics, moving half of a large and potentially expensive media center to the USC campus. On 21 October 2016, the LA 2024 bid committee again enlisted U.S. Olympians to help make the case for bringing the Summer Olympics back to Los Angeles.

On 12 November 2016, Mayor Eric Garcetti and six-time gold medalist sprinter Allyson Felix led an LA 2024 presentation to an array of Olympic leaders and sports officials at a general assembly for the Assn. of National Olympic Committees in Doha, Qatar. On 23 November 2016, President-elect Trump expressed his support for Los Angeles's 2024 Olympic bid during a phone call with Mayor Garcetti. On 2 December 2016, LA 2024 released a new budget estimating it would spend $5.3 billion to stage the Games.

On 2 January 2017, Angeleno Olympians and Paralympians rode on the Rose Parade float titled "Follow the Sun" to promote the city's bid. On 9 January 2017, LA 2024 issued a report predicting that the mega-sporting event would boost the local economy by $11.2 billion. On 25 January 2017, the Los Angeles City Council gave unanimous final approval for a privately run bid. On 28 February 2017, it was announced that four Hollywood film studios (Disney, Fox, NBCUniversal and Warner Bros) would be helping promote the Los Angeles bid. On 20 April 2017, the private committee trying to bring the Summer Olympics back to Los Angeles has issued a new set of renderings and videos showing what those Games might look like.

Following the decision to award the 2024 and 2028 games simultaneously, Los Angeles announced that it would consider a bid for the 2028 Games, if certain conditions were met. On 31 July 2017, the IOC announced Los Angeles as the sole candidate for the 2028 games, with $1.8 billion of additional funding to support local sport and the Games programme.

== Competitors ==
The following is the list of number of competitors in the Games.

Sport	Men	Women	Total
Archery	4	4	8
Artistic swimming	0	0	8
Badminton	1	1	2
Baseball	24	0	24
Basketball	16	16	32
Boxing	3	3	6
Cycling	5	5	10
Diving	4	4	8
Equestrian	0	0	9
Flag football	10	10	20
Football	18	18	36
Golf	1	1	2
Gymnastics	1	12	13
Handball	14	14	28
Judo	7	7	14
Modern pentathlon	1	1	2
Paddle	3	3	6
Rowing	2	2	4
Rugby sevens	12	12	24
Sailing	7	7	14
Shooting	6	6	12
Skateboarding	1	1	2
Softball	0	15	15
Sport climbing	1	1	2
Surfing	1	1	2
Table tennis	3	3	6
Taekwondo	2	2	4
Tennis	3	3	6
Triathlon	2	2	4
Volleyball	14	14	28
Water polo	11	11	22
Weightlifting	3	3	6
Total	162	164	343

== Baseball ==
The United States national baseball team secured an Olympic berth automatically via host nation quota.

Summary

Team	Event	Group stage			Round 1	Repechage 1	Round 2	Repechage 2	Semifinals	Final / BM	
Team	Event	Opposition Result	Opposition Result	Rank	Opposition Result	Opposition Result	Opposition Result	Opposition Result	Opposition Result	Opposition Result	Rank
United States men's	Men's tournament										

== Equestrian ==
As the host nation, the US automatically qualified in all event.

=== Dressage ===
Athlete	Horse	Event	Grand Prix		Grand Prix Special		Grand Prix Freestyle		Overall	
Athlete	Horse	Event	Score	Rank	Score	Rank	Technical	Artistic	Score	Rank
		Individual			—N/a					
	See above	Team								

=== Eventing ===
Athlete	Horse	Event	Dressage		Cross-country			Jumping						Total	
Athlete	Horse	Event	Dressage		Cross-country			Qualifier			Final			Total	
Athlete	Horse	Event	Penalties	Rank	Penalties	Total	Rank	Penalties	Total	Rank	Penalties	Total	Rank	Penalties	Rank
		Individual													
	See above	Team									—N/a				

=== Jumping ===
Athlete	Horse	Event	Qualification			Final			Jump-off		
Athlete	Horse	Event	Penalties	Time	Rank	Penalties	Time	Rank	Penalties	Time	Rank
		Individual									
	See above	Team							—N/a		

Qualification Legend: Q = Qualified for the final based on position in group; q = Qualified for the final based on overall position

== Flag football ==
As the host nation, the US automatically qualified men's and women's team for the games.

== Gymnastics ==
=== Rhythmic ===
As the host nation, the US directly qualified group and one individual for the Olympic tournament.

Athlete	Event	Qualification						Final					
Athlete	Event	Hoop	Ball	Clubs	Ribbon	Total	Rank	Hoop	Ball	Clubs	Ribbon	Total	Rank
	Individual												

== Judo ==
As the host nation, US judoka received fourteen quota places (seven in each gender) at their disposal for the Games.

Men

Athlete	Event	Round of 64	Round of 32	Round of 16	Quarterfinals	Semifinals	Repechage	Final / BM	
Athlete	Event	Opposition Result	Opposition Result	Opposition Result	Opposition Result	Opposition Result	Opposition Result	Opposition Result	Rank
	–60 kg								
	–66 kg								
	–73 kg								
	–81 kg								
	–90 kg								
	–100 kg								
	+100 kg								

Women

Athlete	Event	Round of 32	Round of 16	Quarterfinals	Semifinals	Repechage	Final / BM	
Athlete	Event	Opposition Result	Opposition Result	Opposition Result	Opposition Result	Opposition Result	Opposition Result	Rank
	–48 kg							
	–52 kg							
	–57 kg							
	–63 kg							
	–70 kg							
	–78 kg							
	+78 kg							

Mixed

Nations qualifying at least one athlete in the −57 (−48, −52 & −57), −70 (−57, −63 & −70) & +70 (−70, −78 & +78) weight categories for women, and at least one athlete in the −73 (−60, −66 & −73), −90 (−73, −81 & −90) & +90 (−90, −100 & +100) weight categories for men, would compete in the team event.

Athlete	Event	Round of 32	Round of 16	Quarterfinals	Semifinals	Repechage	Final / BM	
Athlete	Event	Opposition Result	Opposition Result	Opposition Result	Opposition Result	Opposition Result	Opposition Result	Rank
	Team							

== Rugby sevens ==
Summary

Team	Event	Pool round				Quarterfinal	Semifinal / Cl.	Final / BM / Cl.	
Team	Event	Opposition Result	Opposition Result	Opposition Result	Rank	Opposition Result	Opposition Result	Opposition Result	Rank
United States men's	Men's tournament								
United States women's	Women's tournament								

=== Men's tournament ===
As the host nation, the United States national rugby sevens team directly qualified for the Olympic tournament.

=== Women's tournament ===
As the host nation, the United States women's national rugby sevens team directly qualified for the Olympic tournament.

== Sailing ==
As the host nation, the US automatically received a spot in every competition of the sport.

Elimination events

Athlete	Event	Race																											Final rank
Athlete	Event	1	2	3	4	5	6	7	8	9	10	11	12	13	14	QF	SF1	SF2	SF3	SF4	SF5	SF6	F1	F2	F3	F4	F5	F6	Final rank
	Men's Formula Kite															—N/a													
	Men's IQFoil														—N/a														
	Women's Formula Kite															—N/a													
	Women's IQFoil														—N/a														

Medal race events

Athlete	Event	Race																Net points	Final rank
Athlete	Event	1	2	3	4	5	6	7	8	9	10	11	12	13	14	15	M*	Net points	Final rank
	Men's ILCA 7											—N/a					–		
	Men's 49er													—N/a					
	Women's ILCA 6											—N/a					–		
	Women's 49erFX													—N/a					

Mixed

Athlete	Event	Race													Net points	Final rank
Athlete	Event	1	2	3	4	5	6	7	8	9	10	11	12	M*	Net points	Final rank
	470											—N/a				
	Nacra 17															

M = Medal race; EL = Eliminated – did not advance into the medal race

== Triathlon ==
As the host nation, United States automatically secured four athletes quota, comprising two men and two women.

Individual

Athlete	Event	Time						Rank
Athlete	Event	Swim (1.5 km)	Trans 1	Bike (40 km)	Trans 2	Run (10 km)	Total	Rank
	Men's							
	Women's							

Relay

Athlete	Event	Time						Rank
Athlete	Event	Swim (300 m)	Trans 1	Bike (7 km)	Trans 2	Run (2 km)	Total	Rank
	Mixed relay							—N/a
Total	Mixed relay	—N/a						

== Volleyball ==
=== Indoor ===
Summary

Team	Event	Group stage				Quarterfinal	Semifinal	Final / BM	
Team	Event	Opposition Score	Opposition Score	Opposition Score	Rank	Opposition Score	Opposition Score	Opposition Score	Rank
United States men's	Men's tournament								
United States women's	Women's tournament								

==== Men's tournament ====
United States men's volleyball team qualified for the Olympics through the host nation quota.

==== Women's tournament ====
United States men's volleyball team qualified for the Olympics through the host nation quota.

== Water polo ==
Summary

Key:

• FT – After full time.

• P – Match decided by penalty-shootout.

Team	Event	Group stage						Quarterfinal	Semifinal	Final / BM	
Team	Event	Opposition Score	Opposition Score	Opposition Score	Opposition Score	Opposition Score	Rank	Opposition Score	Opposition Score	Opposition Score	Rank
United States men's	Men's tournament										
United States women's	Women's tournament										

=== Men's tournament ===
The United States men's water polo team automatically qualified for the games by virtue of the host nation quota.

=== Women's tournament ===
The United States women's water polo team automatically qualified for the games by virtue of the host nation quota.
