= Great Britain women's Olympic cricket team =

International cricket team

Great Britain
- Association: British Olympic Association

International Cricket Council
- ICC status: Non-member
- ICC region: Europe

The Great Britain women's cricket team is an international cricket team that represents the United Kingdom in the Summer Olympic Games. The team will be making its international debut at the 2028 Summer Olympics.

Outside of the Summer Olympics, the home nations of England and Wales, Ireland (cricket in Northern Ireland is jointly organised with the Republic of Ireland), and Scotland represent themselves in all other competitions.

== History ==
In October 2023, the International Olympic Committee (IOC) announced the reintroduction of cricket to the Olympic Games after a gap of 126 years. As a result, discussions began between the British Olympic Association, England and Wales Cricket Board, and Cricket Scotland to field a combined team representing Great Britain.

On 29 June 2026, the qualification pathway for the 2028 Summer Olympics women's cricket tournament was announced by the International Olympic Committee and the International Cricket Council (ICC). Having qualified for the semi-finals of the 2026 Women's T20 World Cup, England were the highest-ranked eligible European team at the tournament, thereby securing qualification for the Great Britain team to its maiden Olympic cricket tournament.

== Results ==
Great Britain women's cricket results
No.	Date	Match type	Opposition	Venue	Result
1	July 2028	T20	To be determined	United States	TBA
2	July 2028	T20	To be determined	United States	TBA
3	July 2028	T20	To be determined	United States	TBA
4	July 2028	T20	To be determined	United States	TBA

== Tournament history ==
Olympic Games record
Year	Round	Position	GP	W	L	T	NR	Win %
(Greece) 1896	No tournament							
(France) 1900	No women's tournament							
1904–2024	No tournament							
(United States) 2028	Qualified							
(Australia) 2032	TBA							
