= Equestrian events at the 2028 Summer Olympics =

Equestrian at the Games of the XXXIV Olympiad
- Venue: Santa Anita Park, Arcadia, California
- Dates: 15 – 29 July 2028
- No. of events: 6 (6 open)

The equestrian events at the 2028 Summer Olympics in Arcadia, California are scheduled to be held from 27 July to 6 August at the Santa Anita Park, contesting three disciplines for both individual and team competitions, namely dressage, eventing, and jumping.

== Qualification ==
The 200 equestrian quota places were allocated across the three disciplines, with 75 places assigned to jumping, 65 to eventing, and 60 to dressage. Each team consisted of three horse-and-rider combinations, with 20 teams qualifying in jumping, 16 in eventing, and 15 in dressage. NOCs that qualified a team were also awarded three individual entries in the corresponding discipline. NOCs that failed to qualify a team could instead secure one individual place in jumping and dressage, and up to two individual places in eventing, resulting in 15 individual places for jumping and dressage and 17 for eventing. Team qualification was determined primarily through designated competitions, including the World Equestrian Games and continental tournaments, while individual places were allocated based on rankings. As the host nation, the United States was guaranteed one team quota in each of the three disciplines.

== Medal summary ==
=== Medalists ===
Games	Gold	Silver	Bronze
Individual dressage			
Team dressage			
Individual eventing			
Team eventing			
Individual jumping			
Team jumping			
