= 2017–18 Senior Women's T20 League =

- Dates: 12 – 27 January 2018
- Administrator: BCCI
- Cricket format: Twenty20
- Tournament format: Round-robin
- Champions: Delhi (1st title)
- Runners-up: Maharashtra
- Participants: 27
- Most runs: Neha Tanwar (189)
- Most wickets: Keerthi James (17)
- Official website: bcci.tv

The 2017–18 Senior Women's T20 League was the 10th edition of the women's Twenty20 cricket competition in India. It was held from 12 January to 27 January 2018. Railways were the defending champions, who were eliminated at the Elite Group stage. Delhi won the tournament, their first, by topping the Elite Group Super League.

== Competition format ==
The 27 teams competing in the tournament were divided into the Elite Group and the Plate Group, with the 10 teams in the Elite Group further divided into Groups A and B and the 17 teams in the Plate Group into Groups A, B and C. The tournament operated on a round-robin format, with each team playing every other team in their group once. The top two sides from each Elite Group progressed to the Elite Group Super League, which was a further round-robin group, with the winner of the group being crowned Champions. The bottom side from each Elite Group was relegated to the Plate Group for the following season. Meanwhile, the top two from each Plate Group progressed to a knockout stage, with the two teams that reached the final being promoted for the following season, as well as playing off for the Plate Group title. Matches were played using a Twenty20 format.

The groups worked on a points system with positions with the groups being based on the total points. Points were awarded as follows:

Win: 4 points.
Tie: 2 points.
Loss: 0 points.
No Result/Abandoned: 2 points.

If points in the final table are equal, teams are separated by most wins, then head-to-head record, then Net Run Rate.

== Participants ==
27 teams participated in the tournament. The teams were divided in 2 tiers, Elite and Plate, with the Elite level divided into Groups A and B and the Plate level divided into Groups A, B and C.

	Elite Group		Plate Group
Group A	Group B	Group A	Group B	Group C
Goa; Baroda; Bengal; Madhya Pradesh; Uttar Pradesh	Maharashtra; Delhi; Railways; Hyderabad; Mumbai	Kerala; Assam; Karnataka; Vidarbha; Gujarat; Andhra	Himachal Pradesh; Jharkhand; Haryana; Saurashtra; Rajasthan	Tamil Nadu; Chhattisgarh; Odisha; Punjab; Jammu and Kashmir; Tripura

== Venues ==
Venue	City	Country
Saurashtra Cricket Association Stadium	Rajkot	India
Barsapara Stadium	Guwahati	India
Goa Cricket Association Academy Ground	Goa	India
Alur Cricket Ground	Alur	India
Sharad Pawar Cricket Academy BKC	Mumbai	India
T I Murugappa Ground	Chennai	India
M. A. Chidambaram Stadium	Chennai	India
Goa Cricket Association Academy Ground	Goa	India
Sachin Tendulkar Gymkhana	Mumbai	India
Just Cricket	Bangalore	India

== Elite Super League ==
Pos	Team	Pld	W	L	Pts	NRR
1	Delhi (C)	3	2	1	8	+1.105
2	Maharashtra	3	2	1	8	+0.689
3	Baroda	3	2	1	8	–0.083
4	Goa	3	0	3	0	–1.583

Source: BCCI

Match 1
23 January 2018
Scorecard

Delhi; 109/7 (20 overs)	v	Baroda; 110/2 (19.1 overs)
Priya Punia 20 (21); S R Sharma 3/27(4 overs)		P A Patel 47* (56); Mandeep Kaur 1/12 (4 overs)

Baroda won by 8 wickets
Sachin Tendulkar Gymkhana, Mumbai
Umpires: Vikas Bhatt and Gajanand Vashistha

- Baroda won the toss and elected to field.

Match 2
23 January 2018
Scorecard

Maharashtra; 107/7 (20 overs)	v	Goa; 56/9 (20 overs)
Shweta 40 (34); Sanjula Naik 2/12(3 overs)		Yetrekar Sunanda 11 (18); D P Vaidya 3/8 (3 overs)

Maharashtra won by 51 runs
Sachin Tendulkar Gymkhana, Mumbai
Umpires: Rajeev Godara and Manish Jain

- Maharashtra won the toss and elected to bat.

Match 3
25 January 2018
Scorecard

Goa; 104/8 (20 overs)	v	Baroda; 105/9 (19.3 overs)
Sugandha Ghadi 31 (28); Mohite 2/6 (2 overs)		B D Surti 32 (22); Yetrekar Sunanda 2/8 (4 overs)

Baroda won by 1 wicket
Sachin Tendulkar Gymkhana, Mumbai
Umpires: Rajeev Godara and Manish Jain

- Baroda won the toss and elected to field.

Match 4
25 January 2018
Scorecard

Maharashtra; 58/9 (20 overs)	v	Delhi; 59/3 (14.4 overs)
S R Mane 22 (36); R A Dhar 4/14 (4 overs)		Neha Tanwar 22 (21); M R Magre 1/12 (4 overs)

Delhi won by 7 wickets
Sachin Tendulkar Gymkhana, Mumbai
Umpires: Vikas Bhatt and Gajanand Vashistha

- Maharashtra won the toss and elected to bat.

Match 5
27 January 2018
Scorecard

Maharashtra; 109/5(20 overs)	v	Baroda; 95/9 (20 overs)
Shweta 34(34); Radha Yadav 2/22(4 overs)		Yastika Bhatia 24(32); D P Vaidya 4/11 (4 overs)

Maharashtra won by 14 runs
Sachin Tendulkar Gymkhana, Mumbai
Umpires: Gajanand Vashistha and Rajeev Godara

- Baroda won the toss and elected to field.

Match 6
27 January 2018
Scorecard

Goa; 96/5 (20 overs)	v	Delhi; 100/1(13.5 overs)
Sanjula Naik 34* (31); Ankita Sinha 2/11(4 overs)		Neha Tanwar 63* (50); Sanjula Naik 1/28 (4 overs)

Delhi won by 9 wickets
Sachin Tendulkar Gymkhana, Mumbai
Umpires: Vikas Bhatt and Manish Jain

- Delhi won the toss and elected to field.

== Plate playoffs ==
=== Quarter-finals ===
Quarter-final 1
23 January 2018
Scorecard

Chhattisgarh; 71 (19.2 overs)	v	Jharkhand; 75/3 (14.5 overs)
Shivi Pandey 27 (46); Niharika 3/4 (3.2 overs)		Kavita Roy 38 (52); Urmila Harina 1/10 (4 overs)

Jharkhand won by 7 wickets
Alur Cricket Stadium, Alur
Umpires: Kannur Swaroopanand and Dhokre Vaibhav

- Chhattisgarh women won the toss and elected to bat.

Quarter-final 2
23 January 2018
Scorecard

Karnataka; 127/3 (20 overs)	v	Himachal Pradesh; 87 (19 overs)
S Shubha 61 (59); N S Chauhan 1/23 (4 overs)		N S Chauhan 30 (27); Chandu V 4/18 (3 overs)

Karnataka won by 40 runs
Alur Cricket Stadium, Alur
Umpires: Bhanushali Ashish and Chavan Sandeep

- Karnataka won the toss and elected to bat.

=== Semi-finals ===
Semi-final 1
13 January 2017
Scorecard

Kerala; 132/6 (20 overs)	v	Jharkhand; 90 (18.3 overs)
Sajana S 46 (23); Niharika 3/30 (4 overs)		Kavita Roy 32 (43); Shani T 3/12 (4 overs)

Kerala won by 42 runs
Alur Cricket Stadium, Alur
Umpires: Dhokre Vaibhav and Chavan Sandeep

- Jharkhand won the toss and elected to field.

Semi-final 2
25 January 2017
Scorecard

Karnataka; 85 (18.1 overs)	v	Odisha; 89/2 (19 overs)
G Divya C 32 (27); Priyanka Priyadarshini 5/12 (4 overs)		Pragyan P Mohanty 31 (32); Sahana S Pawar 1/12 (4 overs)

Odisha won by 8 wickets
Alur Cricket Stadium, Alur
Umpires: Kannur Swaroopanand and Bhanushali Ashish

- Karnataka won the toss and elected to bat.

=== Final ===
27 January 2018
Scorecard

Odisha; 108/5 (20 overs)	v	Kerala; 100 (19.2 overs)
Madhuri Mehta 28 (35); Keerthi James 2/21 (4 overs)		Thayyil Shani 48 (48); Sujata Mallik 2/21 (4 overs)

Odisha won by 8 runs
Just Cricket, Bangalore
Umpires: Kannur Swaroopanand and Chavan Sandeep

- Odisha won the toss and elected to bat.
