= 2023–24 Senior Women's T20 Trophy =

Cricket tournament

2023–24 Women's Senior T20 Trophy
- Dates: 19 October – 9 November 2023
- Administrator: Board of Control for Cricket in India
- Cricket format: Twenty20
- Tournament format(s): Round-robin tournament and Playoff
- Host: India
- Champions: Mumbai (1st title)
- Runners-up: Uttarakhand
- Participants: 37
- Matches: 129
- Most runs: Jemimah Rodrigues (473)
- Most wickets: Saika Ishaque (18)

The 2023–24 Women's Senior T20 Trophy was the 15th edition of the Women's Senior T20 Trophy, the domestic women's T20 competition in India. It took place from 19 October to 9 November 2023, with 37 teams divided into five groups. The tournament formed part of the 2023–24 Indian domestic cricket season, announced by the Board of Control for Cricket in India (BCCI) in April 2023. Railways, the defending champions, were eliminated in the quarterfinals.

Mumbai won the competition, their first title, defeating Uttarakhand in the final.

== Competition format ==
37 teams competed in the tournament, divided into two groups of eight and three groups of seven. Teams played each other side in their group once in a round-robin format. The top two teams from each group qualified for the knockouts. The teams ranked one to six progressed straight to the quarter-finals, whilst the teams ranked seven to ten played pre-quarter-finals. Matches were played using a Twenty20 format.

The groups worked on a points system with positions within the groups being based on the total points. Points were awarded as follows:

Win: 4 points.
Tie: 2 points.
Loss: 0 points.
No Result/Abandoned: 2 points.

If points in the final table were equal, teams were separated by most wins, then head-to-head record, then Net Run Rate.

== League stage ==
=== Points tables ===
==== Group A ====
Team	P	W	L	T	NR	Pts	NRR
Punjab (Q)	7	7	0	0	0	28	+2.081
Railways (Q)	7	5	1	0	1	22	+3.364
Haryana	7	4	3	0	0	16	+0.685
Jharkhand	7	3	3	0	1	14	+0.215
Tripura	7	2	3	0	2	12	+0.324
Assam	7	2	4	0	1	10	–0.268
Bihar	7	2	4	0	1	10	–1.570
Sikkim	7	0	7	0	0	0	–4.093

==== Group B ====
Team	P	W	L	T	NR	Pts	NRR
Bengal (Q)	7	6	1	0	0	24	+2.270
Karntaka (Q)	7	5	2	0	0	20	+1.853
Tamil Nadu	7	5	2	0	0	20	+1.516
Uttar Pradesh	7	5	2	0	0	20	+0.599
Saurashtra	7	3	4	0	0	12	–0.145
Pondicherry	7	2	5	0	0	8	–1.505
Chandigarh	7	2	5	0	0	8	+0.130
Meghalaya	7	0	7	0	0	0	–4.932

==== Group C ====
Team	P	W	L	T	NR	Pts	NRR
Baroda (Q)	6	5	1	0	0	20	+1.771
Mumbai (Q)	6	5	1	0	0	20	+1.498
Delhi	6	4	2	0	0	16	+1.142
Maharashtra	6	3	3	0	0	12	+1.312
Vidarbha	6	3	3	0	0	12	+0.103
Gujarat	6	1	5	0	0	4	–0.906
Mizoram	6	0	6	0	0	0	–4.972

==== Group D ====
Team	P	W	L	T	NR	Pts	NRR
Kerala (Q)	6	5	1	0	0	20	+0.985
Uttarakhand (Q)	6	4	2	0	0	16	+1.387
Himachal Pradesh	6	4	2	0	0	16	+1.278
Rajasthan	6	4	2	0	0	16	+1.150
Goa	6	3	3	0	0	12	+0.579
Chhattisgarh	6	1	5	0	0	4	–1.737
Manipur	6	0	6	0	0	0	–3.801

==== Group E ====
Team	P	W	L	T	NR	Pts	NRR
Madhya Pradesh (Q)	6	6	0	0	0	24	+3.844
Andhra (Q)	6	5	1	0	0	20	+1.061
Hyderabad	6	4	2	0	0	16	+1.636
Odisha	6	3	3	0	0	12	+0.833
Nagaland	6	2	4	0	0	8	–1.211
Jammu and Kashmir	6	1	5	0	0	4	–1.418
Arunachal Pradesh	6	0	6	0	0	0	–5.482

Source: BCCI

== Knockout stages ==
Pre-quarter-finals
B2	Karnataka	123
D2	Uttarakhand	157/6
C2	Mumbai	188/2
E2	Andhra	95/9

Quarter-finals
A1	Punjab	146/6
D2	Uttarakhand	147/9
C1	Baroda	75
D1	Kerala	79/2
E1	Madhya Pradesh	122/7
C2	Mumbai	135/8
B1	Bengal	96/6
A2	Railways	95

Semi-finals
D2	Uttarakhand	85/2
D1	Kerala	84/8
C2	Mumbai	118/2
B1	Bengal	117/6

Final
D2	Uttarakhand	84/8
C2	Mumbai	87/4

=== Pre-quarter-finals ===
3 November 2023
11:00
Scorecard

Uttarakhand; 157/6 (20 overs)	v	Karnataka; 123 (19.4 overs)
Punam Raut 55 (41); Sahana Pawar 2/30 (4 overs)		Prerana GR 24 (27); Amisha Bahukhandi 4/23 (4 overs)

Uttarakhand won by 34 runs
Shaheed Veer Narayan Singh International Cricket Stadium, Raipur
Umpires: Narayanan Janani and Gayathri Venugopalan

- Karnataka won the toss and elected to field.

3 November 2023
16:30
Scorecard

Mumbai; 188/2 (20 overs)	v	Andhra; 95/9 (20 overs)
Jemimah Rodrigues 112* (66); Saranya Gadwal 1/30 (4 overs)		Hima Sikala 19* (27); Prakashika Naik 3/13 (4 overs)

Mumbai won by 93 runs
Shaheed Veer Narayan Singh International Cricket Stadium, Raipur
Umpires: Narayanan Janani and M Mohamed Rafi

- Andhra won the toss and elected to field.

=== Quarter-finals ===
5 November 2023
Scorecard

Punjab; 146/6 (20 overs)	v	Uttarakhand; 147/9 (19.5 overs)
Pragati Singh 53 (44); Amisha Bahukhandi 2/27 (4 overs)		Jasia Akhtar 47 (28); Neelam Bisht 2/19 (4 overs)

Uttarakhand won by 1 wicket
Shaheed Veer Narayan Singh International Cricket Stadium, Raipur
Umpires: M Mohamed Rafi and K Nidhin

- Uttarakhand won the toss and elected to field.

5 November 2023
16:00
Scorecard

Mumbai; 135/8 (20 overs)	v	Madhya Pradesh; 122/7 (20 overs)
Simran Shaikh 42 (30); Soumya Tiwari 4/14 (4 overs)		Poonam Khemnar 40 (40); Janhvi Rupesh Kate 2/10 (4 overs)

Mumbai won by 13 runs
Shaheed Veer Narayan Singh International Cricket Stadium, Raipur
Umpires: K Nidhin and Gayathri Venugopalan

- Madhya Pradesh won the toss and elected to field.

5 November 2023
Scorecard

Railways; 95 (20 overs)	v	Bengal; 96/6 (19.3 overs)
Dayalan Hemalatha 25 (36); Saika Ishaque 2/12 (4 overs)		Richa Ghosh 25 (22); Tanuja Kanwer 2/14 (4 overs)

Bengal won by 4 wickets
RDCA Ground, Raipur
Umpires: Vrinda Rathi and Narayanan Janani

- Bengal won the toss and elected to field.

5 November 2023
Scorecard

Baroda; 75 (15.5 overs)	v	Kerala; 79/2 (12.4 overs)
Yastika Bhatia 29 (24); Najla Noushad 2/11 (3 overs)		Vaishna Shibu 28* (25); Nancy Patel 1/10 (2 overs)

Kerala won by 8 wickets
RDCA Ground, Raipur
Umpires: Vrinda Rathi and Narayanan Janani
Player of the match: Najla Noushad (Kerala)

- Baroda won the toss and elected to bat.

=== Semi-finals ===
7 November 2023
Scorecard

Kerala; 84/8 (20 overs)	v	Uttarakhand; 85/2 (14.2 overs)
Vinod Drishya 17 (13); Amisha Bahukhandi 2/11 (4 overs)		Punam Raut 43* (41); Aleena Surendran 1/10 (2 overs)

Uttarakhand won by 8 wickets
Shaheed Veer Narayan Singh International Cricket Stadium, Raipur
Umpires: Vrinda Rathi and M Mohamed Rafi
Player of the match: Raghvi Bist (Uttarakhand)

- Uttarakhand won the toss and elected to field.

7 November 2023
Scorecard

Bengal; 117/6 (20 overs)	v	Mumbai; 118/2 (18.4 overs)
Priyanka Bala 32 (38); Saima Thakor 2/13 (3 overs)		Jemimah Rodrigues 82* (62); Sukanya Parida 1/14 (3 overs)

Mumbai won by 8 wickets
Shaheed Veer Narayan Singh International Cricket Stadium, Raipur
Umpires: Narayanan Janani and Gayathri Venugopalan
Player of the match: Jemimah Rodrigues (Mumbai)

- Bengal won the toss and elected to bat.

=== Final ===
9 November 2023
Scorecard

Uttarakhand; 84/8 (20 overs)	v	Mumbai; 87/4 (15.2 overs)
Punam Raut 24 (27); Prakashika Naik 3/14 (4 overs)		Jemimah Rodrigues 30* (30); Prema Rawat 2/17 (4 overs)

Mumbai won by 6 wickets
Shaheed Veer Narayan Singh International Cricket Stadium, Raipur
Umpires: Narayanan Janani and Gayathri Venugopalan
Player of the match: Prakashika Naik (Mumbai)

- Mumbai won the toss and elected to field.

== Statistics ==
=== Most runs ===
Player	Team	Matches	Innings	Runs	Average	HS	100s	50s
Jemimah Rodrigues	Mumbai	10	10	473	67.57	112*	1	3
Punam Raut	Uttarakhand	10	10	367	45.88	58	0	3
Poonam Khemnar	Madhya Pradesh	7	7	329	54.83	142*	1	1
Deepti Sharma	Bengal	9	9	280	40.00	70*	0	4
Gautami Naik	Baroda	7	7	264	66.00	65	0	3

Source: BCCI

=== Most wickets ===
Player	Team	Overs	Wickets	Average	5w
Saika Ishaque	Bengal	35.0	18	8.22	0
Prema Rawat	Uttarakhand	38.0	16	13.18	0
Bhogi Shravani	Hyderabad	20.0	15	5.33	0
Jintimani Kalita	Assam	23.5	15	8.06	0
Ekta Bisht	Uttarakhand	38.5	15	12.06	0

Source: BCCI
