= 2011–12 Senior Women's T20 League =

- Dates: 15 December 2011 – 6 January 2012
- Administrator(s): BCCI
- Cricket format: Twenty20
- Tournament format(s): Round-robin
- Champions: Railways (3rd title)
- Runners-up: Delhi
- Participants: 26
- Matches: 76
- Most runs: Jaya Sharma (318)
- Most wickets: Rasanara Parwin (15)

The 2011–12 Senior Women's T20 League was the 4th edition of the women's Twenty20 cricket competition in India. It took place in December 2011 and January 2012, with 26 teams divided into five regional groups. Railways won the tournament, their third in a row, beating Delhi in the final.

== Competition format ==
The 26 teams competing in the tournament were divided into five zonal groups: Central, East, North, South and West. The tournament operated on a round-robin format, with each team playing every other team in their group once. The top two sides from each group progressed to the Super League round, where the 10 remaining teams were divided into two further round-robin groups. The winner of each group progressed to the final. Matches were played using a Twenty20 format.

The groups worked on a points system with positions with the groups being based on the total points. Points were awarded as follows:

Win: 4 points.
Tie: 2 points.
Loss: 0 points.
No Result/Abandoned: 2 points.

If points in the final table are equal, teams are separated by most wins, then head-to-head record, then Net Run Rate.

== Zonal Tables ==
=== Central Zone ===
Team	P	W	L	T	NR	Pts	NRR
Railways (Q)	4	4	0	0	0	16	+2.608
Uttar Pradesh (Q)	4	2	2	0	0	8	+0.324
Madhya Pradesh	4	2	2	0	0	8	–0.567
Rajasthan	4	1	3	0	0	4	–0.991
Vidarbha	4	1	3	0	0	4	–1.120

=== East Zone ===
Team	P	W	L	T	NR	Pts	NRR
Bengal (Q)	4	4	0	0	0	16	+1.590
Odisha (Q)	4	2	2	0	0	8	+0.887
Tripura	4	2	2	0	0	8	–0.090
Jharkhand	4	1	3	0	0	4	–0.869
Assam	4	1	3	0	0	4	–1.352

=== North Zone ===
Team	P	W	L	T	NR	Pts	NRR
Punjab (Q)	4	4	0	0	0	16	+1.172
Delhi (Q)	4	3	1	0	0	12	+1.032
Haryana	4	2	2	0	0	8	–0.292
Himachal Pradesh	4	1	3	0	0	4	+0.470
Jammu and Kashmir	4	0	4	0	0	0	–2.396

=== South Zone ===
Team	P	W	L	T	NR	Pts	NRR
Karnataka (Q)	5	4	1	0	0	16	+0.203
Hyderabad (Q)	5	3	2	0	0	12	+1.060
Goa	5	3	2	0	0	12	+0.214
Tamil Nadu	5	2	2	1	0	10	+0.341
Andhra	5	2	2	1	0	10	–0.295
Kerala	5	0	5	0	0	0	–1.512

=== West Zone ===
Team	P	W	L	T	NR	Pts	NRR
Maharashtra (Q)	4	4	0	0	0	16	+1.591
Mumbai (Q)	4	3	1	0	0	12	+0.498
Baroda	4	2	2	0	0	8	+0.849
Saurashtra	4	1	3	0	0	4	–1.138
Gujarat	4	0	4	0	0	0	–1.659

Source:CricketArchive

== Super Leagues ==
=== Super League Group A ===
Team	P	W	L	T	NR	Pts	NRR
Delhi (Q)	4	4	0	0	0	16	+2.310
Uttar Pradesh	4	2	2	0	0	8	–0.663
Maharashtra	4	2	2	0	0	8	–1.017
Odisha	4	1	3	0	0	4	–0.084
Karnataka	4	1	3	0	0	4	–0.647

=== Super League Group B ===
Team	P	W	L	T	NR	Pts	NRR
Railways (Q)	4	3	0	0	1	14	+1.671
Hyderabad	4	3	1	0	0	12	+1.098
Punjab	4	2	1	0	1	10	+0.651
Bengal	4	1	3	0	0	4	–1.118
Mumbai	4	0	4	0	0	0	–1.837

Source:CricketArchive

== Final ==
6 January 2012
Scorecard

Delhi; 104 (20 overs)	v	Railways; 105/3 (18.4 overs)
Reema Malhotra 44 (54); Preeti Dimri 2/20 (4 overs)		Sulakshana Naik 46* (43); Shashi Malik 1/17 (3.4 overs)

Railways won by 7 wickets
Ravenshaw College Ground, Cuttack
Umpires: Yeshwant Barde and Ravi Shankar

- Delhi won the toss and elected to bat.

== Statistics ==
=== Most runs ===
Player	Team	Matches	Innings	Runs	Average	HS	100s	50s
Jaya Sharma	Delhi	8	8	318	53.00	68	0	2
Amita Sharma	Railways	8	8	235	47.00	49*	0	0
Veda Krishnamurthy	Karnataka	9	9	211	26.37	52	0	1
Madhuri Mehta	Odisha	8	8	197	28.14	50	0	1
Diana David	Hyderabad	9	9	194	32.33	43*	0	0

Source: CricketArchive

=== Most wickets ===
Player	Team	Overs	Wickets	Average	BBI	5w
Rasanara Parwin	Odisha	27.5	15	9.13	5/15	1
Ananya Upendran	Hyderabad	29.0	14	7.50	4/12	0
Amita Sharma	Railways	28.0	13	8.76	3/14	0
Soniya Dabir	Maharashtra	30.2	13	10.92	3/21	0
Anureet Kaur	Punjab	25.5	11	7.45	5/6	1

Source: CricketArchive
