= 2009–10 Senior Women's T20 League =

- Dates: 30 November – 21 December 2009
- Administrator(s): BCCI
- Cricket format: Twenty20
- Tournament format(s): Round-robin
- Champions: Railways (1st title)
- Runners-up: Maharashtra
- Participants: 26
- Matches: 76
- Most runs: Thirush Kamini (339)
- Most wickets: Soniya Dabir (16)

The 2009–10 Senior Women's T20 League was the 2nd edition of the women's Twenty20 cricket competition in India. It took place in November and December 2009, with 26 teams divided into five regional groups. Railways won the tournament, beating Maharashtra in the final.

== Competition format ==
The 26 teams competing in the tournament were divided into five zonal groups: Central, East, North, South and West. The tournament operated on a round-robin format, with each team playing every other team in their group once. The top two sides from each group progressed to the Super League round, where the 10 remaining teams were divided into two further round-robin groups. The winner of each group progressed to the final. Matches were played using a Twenty20 format.

The groups worked on a points system with positions with the groups being based on the total points. Points were awarded as follows:

Win: 4 points.
Tie: 2 points.
Loss: 0 points.
No Result/Abandoned: 2 points.

If points in the final table are equal, teams are separated by most wins, then head-to-head record, then Net Run Rate.

== Zonal Tables ==
=== Central Zone ===
Team	P	W	L	T	NR	Pts	NRR
Railways (Q)	4	4	0	0	0	16	+3.115
Uttar Pradesh (Q)	4	3	1	0	0	12	+0.420
Madhya Pradesh	4	2	2	0	0	8	–0.105
Vidarbha	4	1	3	0	0	4	–0.558
Rajasthan	4	0	4	0	0	0	–2.577

=== East Zone ===
Team	P	W	L	T	NR	Pts	NRR
Bengal (Q)	4	3	1	0	0	12	+1.357
Assam (Q)	4	3	1	0	0	12	–0.057
Orissa	4	2	2	0	0	8	+0.600
Jharkhand	4	2	2	0	0	8	+0.014
Tripura	4	0	4	0	0	0	–1.866

=== North Zone ===
Team	P	W	L	T	NR	Pts	NRR
Punjab (Q)	4	4	0	0	0	16	+3.166
Delhi (Q)	4	3	1	0	0	12	+1.268
Haryana	4	2	2	0	0	8	–0.366
Himachal Pradesh	4	1	3	0	0	4	–0.987
Jammu and Kashmir	4	0	4	0	0	0	–2.848

=== South Zone ===
Team	P	W	L	T	NR	Pts	NRR
Hyderabad (Q)	5	4	1	0	0	16	+0.910
Tamil Nadu (Q)	5	3	2	0	0	12	+1.152
Kerala	5	3	2	0	0	12	+0.001
Karnataka	5	2	3	0	0	8	+0.163
Goa	5	2	3	0	0	8	–0.664
Andhra	5	1	4	0	0	4	–1.342

=== West Zone ===
Team	P	W	L	T	NR	Pts	NRR
Maharashtra (Q)	4	4	0	0	0	16	+1.725
Gujarat (Q)	4	3	1	0	0	12	+0.418
Mumbai	4	2	2	0	0	8	+0.490
Baroda	4	1	3	0	0	4	–0.699
Saurashtra	4	0	4	0	0	0	–1.918

Source:CricketArchive

== Super Leagues ==
=== Super League Group A ===
Team	P	W	L	T	NR	Pts	NRR
Railways (Q)	4	4	0	0	0	16	+2.646
Delhi	4	3	1	0	0	12	+1.208
Hyderabad	4	2	2	0	0	8	+0.199
Bengal	4	1	3	0	0	4	–0.098
Gujarat	4	0	4	0	0	0	–3.837

=== Super League Group B ===
Team	P	W	L	T	NR	Pts	NRR
Maharashtra (Q)	4	4	0	0	0	16	+2.265
Tamil Nadu	4	3	1	0	0	12	+1.065
Uttar Pradesh	4	2	2	0	0	8	–0.630
Punjab	4	1	3	0	0	4	–0.365
Assam	4	0	4	0	0	0	–2.518

Source:CricketArchive

== Final ==
21 December 2009
Scorecard

Maharashtra; 69/6 (20 overs)	v	Railways; 72/5 (15.1 overs)
Soniya Dabir 30 (30); Rumeli Dhar 1/3 (3 overs)		Sulakshana Naik 28* (34); Trupti Khot 2/10 (4 overs)

Railways won by 5 wickets
Moti Bagh Stadium, Vadodara
Umpires: Rohan Pandit and Krishnamachari Srinivasan

- Maharashtra won the toss and elected to bat.

== Statistics ==
=== Most runs ===
Player	Team	Matches	Innings	Runs	Average	HS	100s	50s
Thirush Kamini	Tamil Nadu	9	9	339	42.37	55	0	2
Anagha Deshpande	Maharashtra	9	9	263	52.60	67*	0	2
Babita Mandlik	Railways	8	8	226	28.25	67	0	1
Mamatha Kanojia	Hyderabad	9	9	221	44.20	52	0	2
Diana David	Hyderabad	9	9	220	27.50	47	0	0

Source: CricketArchive

=== Most wickets ===
Player	Team	Overs	Wickets	Average	BBI	5w
Soniya Dabir	Maharashtra	34.1	16	9.12	3/11	0
Jhulan Goswami	Bengal	28.0	13	6.76	3/6	0
Canchivaram Kamakshi	Hyderabad	21.0	12	7.50	3/9	0
Vijeylaxmi Mallya	Tamil Nadu	32.0	12	8.66	3/9	0
Preeti Dimri	Railways	36.0	12	11.50	3/9	0

Source: CricketArchive
