= 2017–18 Senior Women's One Day League =

- Dates: 6 – 26 December 2017
- Administrator: BCCI
- Cricket format: List A
- Tournament format: Round-robin
- Champions: Railways (11th title)
- Runners-up: Delhi
- Participants: 27
- Most runs: Deepti Sharma (312)
- Most wickets: Shikha Pandey (18)

The 2017–18 Senior Women's One Day League was the 12th edition of the women's List A cricket competition in India. It took place in December 2017 in a round-robin format, with 27 teams divided into an Elite Group and a Plate Group. At the end of season the finalists from the Plate Group, Bengal and Goa, were promoted to the Elite Group, whilst Railways won the Elite Group Super League, their sixth consecutive title in this competition and 11th overall.

== Competition format ==
The 27 teams competing in the tournament were divided into the Elite Group and the Plate Group, with the 10 teams in the Elite Group further divided into Groups A and B and the 17 teams in the Plate Group into Groups A, B and C. The tournament operated on a round-robin format, with each team playing every other team in their group once. The top two sides from each Elite Group progressed to the Elite Group Super League, which was a further round-robin group, with the winner of the group being crowned Champions. The bottom side from each Elite Group was relegated to the Plate Group for the following season. Meanwhile, the top two from each Plate Group progressed to a knockout stage, with the two teams that reached the final being promoted for the following season, as well as playing off for the Plate Group title. Matches were played using a 50 over format.

The groups worked on a points system with positions with the groups being based on the total points. Points were awarded as follows:

Win: 4 points.
Tie: 2 points.
Loss: 0 points.
No Result/Abandoned: 2 points.

If points in the final table are equal, teams are separated by most wins, then head-to-head record, then Net Run Rate.

== Elite Group ==
=== Teams ===
Elite Group A	Elite Group B
Railways	Andhra
Hyderabad	Himachal
Madhya Pradesh	Delhi
Mumbai	Baroda
Maharashtra	Uttar Pradesh

=== Elite Group A ===
Team	Pld	W	L	D	T	N/R	Pts	NRR
Railways	4	4	0	0	0	0	16	+0.647
Andhra	4	3	1	0	0	0	12	+0.454
Hyderabad	4	1	3	0	0	0	4	–0.175
Himachal Pradesh	4	1	3	0	0	0	4	–0.372
Madhya Pradesh	4	1	3	0	0	0	4	–0.460

- Advanced to the Elite Group Super League
- Relegated to the Plate Group

The Elite Group A comprised Railways, Andhra, Hyderabad, Himachal Pradesh and Madhya Pradesh. Railways finished at the top of their table with four wins from four games while Andhra finished in second position.

Group stage
No.	Date	Team 1	Team 2	Venue	Result
1	6 December	Railways	Madhya Pradesh	RRC Stadium, Hyderabad	Railways won by 6 wickets
2	6 December	Andhra	Hyderabad	AOC Cricket Stadium, Hyderabad	Andhra won by 51 runs
13	8 December	Madhya Pradesh	Himachal Pradesh	Rajiv Gandhi International Cricket Stadium, Hyderabad	Madhya Pradesh won by 51 runs
14	8 December	Railways	Hyderabad	AOC Cricket Stadium, Hyderabad	Railways won by 6 runs
25	10 December	Andhra	Himachal Pradesh	RRC Stadium, Hyderabad	Andhra won by 5 wickets
26	10 December	Hyderabad	Madhya Pradesh	AOC Cricket Stadium, Hyderabad	Hyderabad won by 25 runs
37	12 December	Andhra	Railways	RRC Stadium, Hyderabad	Railways won by 6 wickets
38	12 December	Himachal Pradesh	Hyderabad	AOC Cricket Stadium, Hyderabad	Himachal Pradesh won by 6 wickets
49	14 December	Andhra	Madhya Pradesh	AOC Cricket Stadium, Hyderabad	Andhra won by 54 runs
50	14 December	Himachal Pradesh	Railways	RRC Stadium, Hyderabad	Railways won by 5 wickets

=== Elite Group B ===
Team	Pld	W	L	D	T	N/R	Pts	NRR
Delhi	4	3	1	0	0	0	12	-0.055
Mumbai	4	2	2	0	0	0	8	+0.626
Baroda	4	2	2	0	0	0	8	+0.136
Maharashtra	4	2	2	0	0	0	8	–0.118
Uttar Pradesh	4	1	3	0	0	0	4	–0.476

- Advanced to the Elite Group Super League
- Relegated to the Plate Group

The Elite Group B comprised Delhi, Mumbai, Baroda, Maharashtra and Uttar Pradesh. Delhi finished at the top of the table with three wins from four games whilst Mumbai finished in second position.

Group stage
No.	Date	Team 1	Team 2	Venue	Result
72	7 December	Maharashtra	Delhi	GSFC Cricket Ground, Vadodara	Maharashtra won by 36 runs
73	7 December	Mumbai	Baroda	Reliance Cricket Stadium, Vadodara	Mumbai won by 9 wickets
15	8 December	Uttar Pradesh	Maharashtra	Reliance Cricket Stadium, Vadodara	Uttar Pradesh won by 72 runs
16	8 December	Baroda	Delhi	GSFC Cricket Ground, Vadodara	Delhi won by 1 run
27	10 December	Uttar Pradesh	Mumbai	GSFC Cricket Stadium, Vadodara	Mumbai won by 9 wickets
28	10 December	Maharashtra	Baroda	Reliance Cricket Stadium, Vadodara	Baroda won by 4 wickets
39	12 December	Mumbai	Delhi	Reliance Cricket Stadium, Vadodara	Delhi won by 6 wickets
40	12 December	Baroda	Uttar Pradesh	GSFC Cricket Ground, Vadodara	Baroda won by 7 wickets
51	14 December	Mumbai	Maharashtra	GSFC Cricket Ground, Vadodara	Maharashtra won by 21 runs
52	14 December	Uttar Pradesh	Delhi	Reliance Cricket Stadium, Vadodara	Delhi won by 6 wickets

=== Elite Group Super League ===
Team	Pld	W	L	D	T	N/R	Pts	NRR
Railways	3	3	0	0	0	0	12	+2.031
Delhi	3	1	2	0	0	0	4	-0.602
Mumbai	3	1	2	0	0	0	4	-0.610
Andhra	3	1	2	0	0	0	4	+0.915

- Champions
- Runners-up

Railways emerged as champions of the 2017–18 Senior Women's One Day League. The Mithali Raj-led team won all their three matches in the Super League to finish at the top of the table and claim the title, whilst Delhi finished as runners-up.

Group stage
No.	Date	Team 1	Team 2	Venue	Result
61	21 December	Railways	Mumbai	Motibaug Cricket Ground, Vadodara	Railways won by 96 runs
62	21 December	Andhra	Delhi	Railway Ground, Vadodara	Andhra won by 8 wickets
65	23 December	Railways	Andhra	Railway Ground, Vadodara	Railways won by 187 runs
66	23 December	Delhi	Mumbai	Motibaug Cricket Ground, Vadodara	Delhi won by 4 wickets
69	25 December	Railways	Delhi	Motibaug Cricket Ground, Vadodara	Railways won by 5 wickets
70	25 December	Andhra	Mumbai	Motibaug Cricket Ground, Vadodara	Mumbai won by 4 wickets

== Plate Group ==
=== Teams ===
Plate Group A	Plate Group B	Plate Group C
Karnataka	Haryana	Saurashtra
Punjab	Tamil Nadu	Odisha
Vidarbha	Kerala	Gujarat
Jharkhand	Assam	Bengal
Goa	Tripura	Chhattisgarh
Rajasthan		Jammu and Kashmir

=== Plate Group A ===
Team	Pld	W	L	D	T	N/R	Pts	NRR
Karnataka	5	3	1	0	0	1	14	+0.453
Haryana	5	3	1	0	0	1	14	+0.273
Saurashtra	5	3	1	0	0	1	14	–0.209
Punjab	5	1	3	0	0	1	6	–0.177
Tamil Nadu	5	1	3	0	0	1	6	–0.189
Odisha	5	1	3	0	0	1	6	–0.189

- Advanced to Plate Group Semi-finals
- Advanced to Plate Group Quarter-finals

Group stage
No.	Date	Team 1	Team 2	Venue	Result
5	6 December	Haryana	Saurashtra	DRIEMS Ground, Cuttack	Haryana won by 10 wickets
6	6 December	Karnataka	Tamil Nadu	Nimpur Ground, Cuttack	Karnataka won by 6 wickets
7	6 December	Odisha	Punjab	Ravenshaw University Ground, Cuttack	Odisha won by 43 runs
17	8 December	Odisha	Saurashtra	Nimpur Ground, Cuttack	Match Abandoned
18	8 December	Karnataka	Haryana	Ravenshaw University Ground, Cuttack	Match Abandoned
19	8 December	Punjab	Tamil Nadu	DRIEMS Ground, Cuttack	Match Abandoned
29	10 December	Karnataka	Odisha	Ravenshaw University Ground, Cuttack	Karnataka won by 75 runs
30	10 December	Haryana	Tamil Nadu	DRIEMS Ground, Cuttack	Haryana won by 7 wickets
31	10 December	Punjab	Saurashtra	Nimpur Ground, Cuttack	Saurashtra won by 3 wickets
41	12 December	Karnataka	Saurashtra	DRIEMS Ground, Cuttack	Saurashtra won by 2 wickets
42	12 December	Tamil Nadu	Odisha	Nimpur Ground, Cuttack	Tamil Nadu won by 2 wickets
43	12 December	Haryana	Punjab	Ravenshaw University Ground, Cuttack	Punjab won by 19 runs
53	14 December	Tamil Nadu	Saurashtra	Nimpur Ground, Cuttack	Saurashtra won by 3 wickets
54	14 December	Odisha	Haryana	Ravenshaw University Ground, Cuttack	Haryana won by 2 wickets
55	14 December	Karnataka	Punjab	DRIEMS Ground, Cuttack	Karnataka won by 4 wickets

=== Plate Group B ===
Team	Pld	W	L	D	T	N/R	Pts	NRR
Vidarbha	4	3	1	0	0	0	12	+0.597
Kerala	4	3	1	0	0	0	12	+0.269
Gujarat	4	2	2	0	0	0	8	+0.086
Jharkhand	4	1	3	0	0	0	4	–0.321
Assam	4	1	3	0	0	0	4	–0.560

- Advanced to Plate Group Quarter-finals

Group stage
No.	Date	Team 1	Team 2	Venue	Result
8	6 December	Assam	Kerala	JSCA Oval Ground, Ranchi	Kerala won by 88 runs
9	6 December	Vidarbha	Jharkhand	JSCA International Stadium Complex, Ranchi	Vidarbha won by 11 runs
20	8 December	Gujarat	Kerala	JSCA International Stadium Complex, Ranchi	Kerala won by 4 wickets
21	8 December	Vidarbha	Assam	JSCA Oval Ground, Ranchi	Vidarbha won by 36 runs
32	10 December	Gujarat	Jharkhand	JSCA International Stadium Complex, Ranchi	Gujarat won by 75 runs
33	10 December	Kerala	Vidarbha	JSCA Oval Ground, Ranchi	Vidarbha won by 7 wickets
44	12 December	Jharkhand	Assam	JSCA International Stadium Complex, Ranchi	Jharkhand won by 36 runs
45	12 December	Vidarbha	Gujarat	JSCA Oval Ground, Ranchi	Gujarat won by 6 wickets
56	14 December	Jharkhand	Kerala	JSCA International Stadium Complex, Ranchi	Kerala won by 5 wickets
57	14 December	Assam	Gujarat	JSCA Oval Ground, Ranchi	Assam won by 48 runs

=== Plate Group C ===
Team	Pld	W	L	D	T	N/R	Pts	NRR
Bengal	5	3	1	0	0	1	14	+1.138
Goa	5	3	1	0	0	1	14	+0.571
Tripura	5	3	1	0	0	1	14	+0.482
Chhattisgarh	5	2	2	0	0	1	10	+0.645
Rajasthan	5	1	3	0	0	1	6	–0.300
Jammu and Kashmir	5	0	4	0	0	1	2	–2.535

- Advanced to Plate Group Semi-finals
- Advanced to Plate Group Quarter-finals

Group stage
No.	Date	Team 1	Team 2	Venue	Result
10	6 December	Jammu and Kashmir	Bengal	Bengal Cricket Academy Ground, Kalyani	Bengal won by 10 wickets
11	6 December	Rajasthan	Tripura	JU Second Campus, Salt Lake, Kolkata	Tripura won by 42 runs
12	6 December	Chhattisgarh	Goa	Eden Gardens, Kolkata	Goa won by 2 wickets
22	8 December	Jammu and Kashmir	Chhattisgarh	JU Second Campus, Salt Lake, Kolkata	Chhattisgarh won by 162 runs
23	8 December	Bengal	Tripura	Bengal Cricket Academy Ground, Kalyani	Tripura won by 9 runs
24	8 December	Goa	Rajasthan	Eden Gardens, Kolkata	Goa won by 8 wickets
34	10 December	Chhattisgarh	Tripura	JU Second Campus, Salt Lake, Kolkata	Match Abandoned
35	10 December	Bengal	Rajasthan	Bengal Cricket Academy Ground, Kalyani	Match Abandoned
36	10 December	Goa	Jammu and Kashmir	Eden Gardens, Kolkata	Match Abandoned
46	12 December	Tripura	Jammu and Kashmir	Eden Gardens, Kolkata	Tripura won by 10 wickets
47	12 December	Rajasthan	Chhattisgarh	JU Second Campus, Salt Lake, Kolkata	Chhattisgarh won by 8 wickets
48	12 December	Bengal	Goa	Bengal Cricket Academy Ground, Kalyani	Bengal won by 7 wickets
58	14 December	Rajasthan	Jammu and Kashmir	JU Second Campus, Salt Lake, Kolkata	Rajasthan won by 49 runs
59	14 December	Chhattisgarh	Bengal	Bengal Cricket Academy Ground, Kalyani	Bengal won by 8 wickets
60	14 December	Tripura	Goa	Eden Gardens, Kolkata	Goa won by 1 wicket

=== Plate Knockout Stage ===
No.	Date	Team 1	Team 2	Venue	Result
Quarter-finals
63	21 December	Vidarbha	Haryana	JU Second Campus Ground, Salt Lake, Kolkata	Vidarbha won by 10 wickets
64	22 December	Goa	Kerala	JU Second Campus Ground, Salt Lake, Kolkata	Goa won by 71 runs
Semi-finals
67	24 December	Bengal	Vidarbha	Eden Gardens, Kolkata	Bengal won by 37 runs (Promoted to Elite Group)
68	24 December	Karnataka	Goa	JU Second Campus Ground, Salt Lake, Kolkata	Goa won by 3 wickets (Promoted to Elite Group)
Final
71	26 December	Bengal	Goa	Eden Gardens, Kolkata	Goa won by 37 runs

== Statistics ==
=== Most runs ===
Player	Team	Mat	Inns	Runs	Ave	SR	HS	100	50
Deepti Sharma	Bengal	6	6	313	104.00	65.13	77	0	5
Sheral Rozario	Mumbai	7	7	258	51.60	53.08	57*	0	1
Sarika Koli	Railways	7	7	257	36.71	61.19	71	0	1
Monika Das	Assam	4	4	256	64.00	85.33	151	1	1
Priya Punia	Delhi	7	4	254	42.33	50.09	79*	0	3

Source: BCCI

=== Most wickets ===
Player	Team	Balls	Wkts	Ave	Econ	BBI	SR	4WI	5WI
Shikha Pandey	Goa	384	18	7.16	2.01	6-10	21.33	2	1
Fatima Jaffer	Mumbai	380	15	12.66	3.20	5-19	23.73	1	1
Moutushi Dey	Tripura	142	14	5.28	3.12	5-13	10.14	1	1
Neha Maji	Bengal	342	14	10.64	2.61	5-19	24.42	0	1
Mallika Thalluri	Andhra	329	13	15.84	3.75	3-35	25.30	0	0
Adila Khanam	Chhattisgarh	196	12	6.33	2.32	5-29	16.33	1	1

Source: BCCI
