= 2010–11 Senior Women's One Day League =

- Dates: 20 October – 5 December 2010
- Administrator(s): BCCI
- Cricket format: List A
- Tournament format(s): Round-robin and final
- Champions: Railways (5th title)
- Runners-up: Mumbai
- Participants: 26
- Matches: 76
- Most runs: Karu Jain (319)
- Most wickets: Priyanka Roy (21); Jhulan Goswami (21)

The 2010–11 Senior Women's One Day League was the 5th edition of the women's List A cricket competition in India. It took place from 20 October to 5 December 2010, with 26 teams divided into five regional groups. Railways won the tournament, beating Mumbai in the final, claiming their fifth title in five years.

== Competition format ==
The 26 teams competing in the tournament were divided into five zonal groups: Central, East, North, South and West. The tournament operated on a round-robin format, with each team playing every other team in their group once. The top two sides from each group progressed to the Super League round, where the 10 remaining teams were divided into two further round-robin groups. The winner of each group progressed to the final. Matches were played using a 50 over format.

The groups worked on a points system with positions with the groups being based on the total points. Points were awarded as follows:

Win: 4 points.
Tie: 2 points.
Loss: –1 points.
No Result/Abandoned: 2 points.
Bonus Points: 1 point available per match.
Consolation Points: 1 point available per match.

If points in the final table are equal, teams are separated by most wins, then head-to-head record, then number of Bonus Points, then Net Run Rate.

== Zonal Tables ==
=== Central Zone ===
| Team | P | W | L | T | NR | BP | CP | Pts | NRR |
|---|---|---|---|---|---|---|---|---|---|
| Railways (Q) | 4 | 4 | 0 | 0 | 0 | 4 | 0 | 20 | +1.656 |
| Madhya Pradesh (Q) | 4 | 2 | 2 | 0 | 0 | 2 | 0 | 8 | +0.162 |
| Uttar Pradesh | 4 | 2 | 2 | 0 | 0 | 2 | 0 | 8 | +0.044 |
| Vidarbha | 4 | 1 | 2 | 0 | 1 | 1 | 0 | 5 | –0.764 |
| Rajasthan | 4 | 0 | 3 | 0 | 1 | 0 | 0 | –1 | –2.252 |

=== East Zone ===
| Team | P | W | L | T | NR | BP | CP | Pts | NRR |
|---|---|---|---|---|---|---|---|---|---|
| Bengal (Q) | 4 | 4 | 0 | 0 | 0 | 4 | 0 | 20 | +1.667 |
| Jharkhand (Q) | 4 | 3 | 1 | 0 | 0 | 1 | 0 | 12 | +0.150 |
| Tripura | 4 | 2 | 2 | 0 | 0 | 1 | 0 | 7 | –0.453 |
| Assam | 4 | 0 | 3 | 0 | 1 | 0 | 2 | 1 | –0.717 |
| Orissa | 4 | 0 | 3 | 0 | 1 | 0 | 1 | 0 | –0.655 |

=== North Zone ===
| Team | P | W | L | T | NR | BP | CP | Pts | NRR |
|---|---|---|---|---|---|---|---|---|---|
| Delhi (Q) | 4 | 4 | 0 | 0 | 0 | 4 | 0 | 20 | +2.534 |
| Punjab (Q) | 4 | 2 | 2 | 0 | 0 | 2 | 1 | 9 | +0.361 |
| Haryana | 4 | 2 | 2 | 0 | 0 | 1 | 1 | 8 | –0.205 |
| Himachal Pradesh | 4 | 2 | 2 | 0 | 0 | 1 | 0 | 7 | –0.532 |
| Jammu and Kashmir | 4 | 0 | 4 | 0 | 0 | 0 | 0 | –4 | –2.321 |

=== South Zone ===
| Team | P | W | L | T | NR | BP | CP | Pts | NRR |
|---|---|---|---|---|---|---|---|---|---|
| Hyderabad (Q) | 5 | 5 | 0 | 0 | 0 | 4 | 0 | 24 | +1.429 |
| Karnataka (Q) | 5 | 3 | 2 | 0 | 0 | 2 | 2 | 14 | +0.790 |
| Goa | 5 | 2 | 1 | 0 | 2 | 1 | 0 | 12 | –0.285 |
| Andhra | 5 | 1 | 2 | 0 | 2 | 1 | 0 | 7 | –0.261 |
| Tamil Nadu | 5 | 0 | 2 | 0 | 3 | 0 | 1 | 5 | –0.820 |
| Kerala | 5 | 0 | 4 | 0 | 1 | 0 | 0 | –2 | –1.376 |

=== West Zone ===
| Team | P | W | L | T | NR | BP | CP | Pts | NRR |
|---|---|---|---|---|---|---|---|---|---|
| Mumbai(Q) | 4 | 3 | 0 | 0 | 1 | 3 | 0 | 17 | +2.256 |
| Maharashtra (Q) | 4 | 2 | 0 | 0 | 2 | 2 | 0 | 14 | +3.385 |
| Saurashtra | 4 | 1 | 2 | 0 | 1 | 1 | 0 | 5 | –1.260 |
| Gujarat | 4 | 1 | 3 | 0 | 0 | 1 | 0 | 2 | –0.864 |
| Baroda | 4 | 0 | 2 | 0 | 2 | 0 | 2 | 2 | –1.180 |

Source:CricketArchive

== Super Leagues ==
=== Super League Group A ===
| Team | P | W | L | T | NR | BP | CP | Pts | NRR |
|---|---|---|---|---|---|---|---|---|---|
| Railways (Q) | 4 | 4 | 0 | 0 | 0 | 2 | 0 | 18 | +0.639 |
| Delhi | 4 | 3 | 1 | 0 | 0 | 1 | 1 | 13 | +0.345 |
| Hyderabad | 4 | 2 | 2 | 0 | 0 | 2 | 2 | 10 | +0.548 |
| Maharashtra | 4 | 1 | 3 | 0 | 0 | 1 | 1 | 3 | +0.054 |
| Jharkhand | 4 | 0 | 4 | 0 | 0 | 0 | 0 | –4 | –1.661 |

=== Super League Group B ===
| Team | P | W | L | T | NR | BP | CP | Pts | NRR |
|---|---|---|---|---|---|---|---|---|---|
| Mumbai (Q) | 4 | 4 | 0 | 0 | 0 | 4 | 0 | 20 | +1.075 |
| Bengal | 4 | 3 | 1 | 0 | 0 | 3 | 0 | 14 | +0.776 |
| Karnataka | 4 | 2 | 2 | 0 | 0 | 0 | 0 | 6 | –0.610 |
| Punjab | 4 | 1 | 3 | 0 | 0 | 0 | 1 | 2 | –0.740 |
| Madhya Pradesh | 4 | 0 | 4 | 0 | 0 | 0 | 2 | –2 | –0.520 |

Source:CricketArchive

== Final ==
5 December 2010
Scorecard

| Railways; 196/6 (50 overs) | v | Mumbai; 155/7 (50 overs) |
| Sulakshana Naik 53 (96); Nancy Daruwalla 2/28 (10 overs) | | Punam Raut 44 (83); Neetu David 2/22 (9 overs) |

Railways won by 41 runs
Sardar Patel Stadium, Ahmedabad
Umpires: Amit Bansal and Ganesh Iyer

- Railways won the toss and elected to bat.

== Statistics ==
=== Most runs ===
| Player | Team | Matches | Innings | Runs | Average | HS | 100s | 50s |
|---|---|---|---|---|---|---|---|---|
| Karu Jain | Karnataka | 9 | 9 | 319 | 39.87 | 91 | 0 | 5 |
| Reema Malhotra | Delhi | 8 | 7 | 308 | 102.66 | 65* | 0 | 3 |
| Veda Krishnamurthy | Karnataka | 9 | 9 | 306 | 38.25 | 107* | 2 | 0 |
| Jhulan Goswami | Bengal | 8 | 6 | 285 | 95.00 | 120* | 1 | 1 |
| Punam Raut | Mumbai | 8 | 8 | 256 | 36.57 | 70* | 0 | 3 |

Source: CricketArchive

=== Most wickets ===
| Player | Team | Overs | Wickets | Average | BBI | 5w |
|---|---|---|---|---|---|---|
| Priyanka Roy | Railways | 64.3 | 21 | 7.52 | 8/14 | 1 |
| Jhulan Goswami | Bengal | 70.3 | 21 | 7.61 | 5/11 | 1 |
| Gouher Sultana | Hyderabad | 73.5 | 18 | 9.50 | 4/15 | 0 |
| Rajeshwari Gayakwad | Karanataka | 68.2 | 17 | 13.64 | 3/17 | 0 |
| Shilpa Gupta | Delhi | 48.4 | 16 | 5.75 | 5/8 | 1 |

Source: CricketArchive
