= 2016–17 Senior Women's T20 League =

- Dates: 2 – 15 January 2017
- Administrator: BCCI
- Cricket format: Twenty20
- Tournament format: Round-robin
- Champions: Railways (8th title)
- Runners-up: Hyderabad
- Participants: 27
- Most runs: Mithali Raj (311)
- Most wickets: Nidhi Buley (18)
- Official website: bcci.tv

The 2016–17 Senior Women's T20 League was the 9th edition of the women's Twenty20 cricket competition in India. It was held from 2 to 15 January 2017. Railways were the defending champions and won the 2016–17 tournament, their eighth in a row, by topping the Elite Group Super League.

== Competition format ==
The 27 teams competing in the tournament were divided into the Elite Group and the Plate Group, with the 10 teams in the Elite Group further divided into Groups A and B and the 17 teams in the Plate Group into Groups A, B and C. The tournament operated on a round-robin format, with each team playing every other team in their group once. The top two sides from each Elite Group progressed to the Elite Group Super League, which was a further round-robin group, with the winner of the group being crowned Champions. The bottom side from each Elite Group was relegated to the Plate Group for the following season. Meanwhile, the top two from each Plate Group progressed to a knockout stage, with the two teams that reached the final being promoted for the following season, as well as playing off for the Plate Group title. Matches were played using a Twenty20 format.

The groups worked on a points system with positions with the groups being based on the total points. Points were awarded as follows:

Win: 4 points.
Tie: 2 points.
Loss: 0 points.
No Result/Abandoned: 2 points.

If points in the final table are equal, teams are separated by most wins, then head-to-head record, then Net Run Rate.

== Participants ==
27 teams participated in the tournament. The teams were divided in 2 tiers, Elite and Plate, with the Elite level divided into Groups A and B and the Plate level divided into Groups A, B and C.

Elite Group		Plate Group
Group A	Group B	Group A	Group B	Group C
Bengal; Kerala; Maharashtra; Mumbai; Railways	Goa; Hyderabad; Madhya Pradesh; Odisha; Uttar Pradesh	Andhra; Delhi; Haryana; Jharkhand; Tamil Nadu; Tripura	Baroda; Gujarat; Karnataka; Punjab; Rajasthan	Assam; Chhattisgarh; Himachal Pradesh; Jammu and Kashmir; Saurashtra; Vidarbha

== Venue ==
The following venues hosted the tournament.

- MBB Stadium, Agartala
- SMS Stadium, Jaipur
- Keenan Stadium, Jamshedpur
- Feroz Shah Kotla Ground, New Delhi
- Alur Cricket Stadium-II, Bangalore
- TIT Ground, Agartala
- RCA Academy Ground, Jaipur
- Railway Cricket Ground, Rajkot
- VCA Ground, Nagpur
Venues for the 2016–17 Senior Women's T20 League

== Elite Group ==
=== Elite Group A ===
Team	P	W	L	T	NR	Pts	NRR
Railways (Q)	4	4	0	0	0	16	+3.376
Bengal (Q)	4	3	1	0	0	12	–0.127
Maharashtra	4	2	2	0	0	8	+0.325
Mumbai	4	1	3	0	0	4	–0.863
Kerala (R)	4	0	4	0	0	0	–2.464

=== Elite Group B ===
Team	P	W	L	T	NR	Pts	NRR
Madhya Pradesh (Q)	4	4	0	0	0	16	+0.192
Hyderabad (Q)	4	3	1	0	0	12	+0.532
Uttar Pradesh	4	2	2	0	0	8	+0.031
Goa	4	1	3	0	0	4	+0.113
Odisha (R)	4	0	4	0	0	0	–0.844

=== Elite Group Super League ===
Team	P	W	L	T	NR	Pts	NRR
Railways (C)	3	3	0	0	0	12	+2.183
Hyderabad	3	1	2	0	0	4	–0.282
Bengal	3	1	2	0	0	4	–0.625
Madhya Pradesh	3	1	2	0	0	4	–1.083

Source: CricketArchive

==== Fixtures ====
10 January 2017
Scorecard

Railways; 167/0	v	Hyderabad; 158/4

Railways won by 9 runs
Railway Cricket Ground, Rajkot

10 January 2017
Scorecard

Bengal; 124/5	v	Madhya Pradesh; 121/6

Bengal won by 3 runs
Railway Cricket Ground, Rajkot

11 January 2017
Scorecard

Bengal; 82/6	v	Railways; 84/1

Railways won by 9 wickets
Railway Cricket Ground, Rajkot

11 January 2017
Scorecard

Madhya Pradesh; 122/6	v	Hyderabad; 112/8

Madhya Pradesh won by 10 runs
Railway Cricket Ground, Rajkot

13 January 2017
Scorecard

Railways; 168/4	v	Madhya Pradesh; 96

Railways won by 72 runs
Railway Cricket Ground, Rajkot

13 January 2017
Scorecard

Bengal; 112/5	v	Hyderabad; 113/5

Hyderabad won by 5 wickets
Railway Cricket Ground, Rajkot

== Plate Playoffs ==
=== Quarter-finals ===
11 January 2017
Scorecard

Haryana; 95/5	v	Baroda; 96/4

Baroda won by 6 wickets
Vidarbha Cricket Association Ground, Nagpur

11 January 2017
Scorecard

Karnataka; 135/4	v	Saurashtra; 100/8

Karnataka won by 35 runs
Vidarbha Cricket Association Ground, Nagpur

=== Semi-finals ===
13 January 2017
Scorecard

Vidarbha; 92/7	v	Baroda; 93/3

Baroda won by 7 wickets
Vidarbha Cricket Association Ground, Nagpur

13 January 2017
Scorecard

Karnataka; 104/9	v	Delhi; 105/2

Delhi won by 8 wickets
Vidarbha Cricket Association Ground, Nagpur

=== Final ===
15 January 2017
Scorecard

Delhi; 115/3	v	Baroda; 110/8

Delhi won by 5 runs
Vidarbha Cricket Association Ground, Nagpur

== Statistics ==
=== Most Runs ===
Pos	Player	Team	Runs	Mat	Inns	NO	HS	Avg	BF	SR	100	50	4s	6s
1	Mithali Raj	Railways	311	7	6	4	100*	155.50	274	113.50	1	2	40	3
2	Punam Raut	Railways	274	7	7	3	75*	68.50	226	121.23	0	3	30	9
3	Mona Meshram	Vidarbha	265	6	6	2	75*	66.25	241	109.95	0	2	32	2
4	Mridula Jadeja	Saurashtra	246	6	6	4	45*	123.00	285	86.31	0	0	17	1
5	Latika Kumari	Delhi	231	6	6	2	59*	57.75	197	117.25	0	2	37	0

=== Most wickets ===
Pos	Player	Team	Wkts	Mat	Inns	Overs	Runs	BBI	Avg	Econ	SR	4w	5w
1	Nidhi Buley	Madhya Pradesh	18	7	7	27.5	144	5/17	8.00	5.17	9.27	0	1
2	Reena Dabhi	Saurashtra	13	6	6	23.4	89	4/9	6.84	3.76	10.92	1	0
3	Reema Malhotra	Delhi	13	7	7	18.3	103	3/11	7.92	5.56	8.53	0	0
4	Ashwani Kumari	Jharkhand	12	5	5	18.0	88	4/20	7.33	4.88	9.00	1	0
5	Babita Negi	Delhi	12	7	8	23.5	105	3/17	8.75	4.40	11.91	0	0
