= 2015–16 Senior Women's T20 League =

- Dates: 2 – 15 January 2016
- Administrator: BCCI
- Cricket format: Twenty20
- Tournament format: Round-robin
- Champions: Railways (7th title)
- Runners-up: Maharashtra
- Participants: 26
- Matches: 66
- Most runs: Smriti Mandhana (224)
- Most wickets: Rupali Chavan (13)

The 2015–16 Senior Women's T20 League was the 8th edition of the women's Twenty20 cricket competition in India. It took place in January 2016 with 26 teams divided into an Elite Group and a Plate Group. Railways won the tournament, their seventh in a row, by topping the Elite Group Super League.

== Competition format ==
The 26 teams competing in the tournament were divided into the Elite Group and the Plate Group, with the 10 teams in the Elite Group further divided into Groups A and B and the 16 teams in the Plate Group into Groups A, B and C. The tournament operated on a round-robin format, with each team playing every other team in their group once. The top two sides from each Elite Group progressed to the Elite Group Super League, which was a further round-robin group, with the winner of the group being crowned Champions. The bottom side from each Elite Group was relegated to the Plate Group for the following season. Meanwhile, the top two from each Plate Group progressed to a knockout stage, with the two teams that reached the final being promoted for the following season, as well as playing off for the Plate Group title. Matches were played using a Twenty20 format.

The groups worked on a points system with positions with the groups based on the total points. Points were awarded as follows:

Win: 4 points.
Tie: 2 points.
Loss: 0 points.
No Result/Abandoned: 2 points.

If points in the final table were equal, teams were separated by most wins, then head-to-head record, then Net Run Rate.

== Elite Group ==
=== Elite Group A ===
Team	P	W	L	T	NR	Pts	NRR
Goa (Q)	4	4	0	0	0	16	+0.641
Odisha (Q)	4	3	1	0	0	12	+0.387
Madhya Pradesh	4	2	2	0	0	8	–0.147
Kerala	4	1	3	0	0	4	–0.743
Punjab (R)	4	0	4	0	0	0	–0.488

=== Elite Group B ===
Team	P	W	L	T	NR	Pts	NRR
Railways (Q)	4	3	1	0	0	12	+1.613
Maharashtra (Q)	4	3	1	0	0	12	–0.034
Hyderabad	4	2	2	0	0	8	–0.025
Bengal	4	2	2	0	0	8	–0.404
Delhi (R)	4	0	4	0	0	0	–1.203

=== Elite Group Super League ===
Team	P	W	L	T	NR	Pts	NRR
Railways (C)	3	3	0	0	0	12	+1.683
Maharashtra	3	2	1	0	0	8	+0.174
Goa	3	1	2	0	0	4	–0.402
Odisha	3	0	3	0	0	0	–1.516

Source: BCCI

== Plate Group ==
=== Plate Group A ===
Team	P	W	L	T	NR	Pts	NRR
Himachal Pradesh (Q)	5	5	0	0	0	20	+0.757
Baroda (Q)	5	4	1	0	0	16	+2.098
Assam	5	3	2	0	0	12	–0.275
Rajasthan	5	2	3	0	0	8	+0.342
Gujarat	5	1	4	0	0	4	–0.948
Jammu and Kashmir	5	0	5	0	0	0	–2.085

=== Plate Group B ===
Team	P	W	L	T	NR	Pts	NRR
Mumbai (Q)	4	4	0	0	0	16	+1.683
Uttar Pradesh (Q)	4	3	1	0	0	12	+0.275
Saurashtra	4	2	2	0	0	8	–0.675
Vidarbha	4	1	3	0	0	4	–0.345
Tripura	4	0	4	0	0	0	–0.990

=== Plate Group C ===
Team	P	W	L	T	NR	Pts	NRR
Andhra (Q)	4	3	1	0	0	12	+0.754
Haryana (Q)	4	3	1	0	0	12	+0.104
Jharkhand	4	2	2	0	0	8	–0.061
Tamil Nadu	4	1	3	0	0	4	–0.268
Karnataka	4	1	3	0	0	4	–0.499

Advanced to Plate Group Semi-finals
Advanced to Plate Group Quarter-finals

Source: BCCI

=== Knockout stage ===
Quarter-finals
C2	Haryana	109/6
B1	Mumbai	112/5
A2	Baroda	104/6
B2	Uttar Pradesh	105/7

Semi-finals
B1	Mumbai	126/7
A1	Himachal Pradesh	100/9
B2	Uttar Pradesh	123/6
C1	Andhra	80/9

Final
B2	Uttar Pradesh	64
B1	Mumbai	65/2

==== Quarter-finals ====
11 January 2016
Scorecard

Haryana; 109/6 (20 overs)	v	Mumbai; 112/5 (19.3 overs)
Mansi Joshi 51 (60); Fatima Jaffer 3/7 (4 overs)		Sulakshana Naik 47 (52); Preeti Bose 2/10 (4 overs)

Mumbai won by 5 wickets
Jharkhand State Cricket Association Oval Ground, Ranchi
Umpires: Abhijit Bhattacharya and Mahanta Narayandev

- Haryana won the toss and elected to bat.

11 January 2016
Scorecard

Baroda; 104/6 (20 overs)	v	Uttar Pradesh; 105/7 (18.3 overs)
Binaisha Surti 28 (28); Zeenat Qureshi 2/15 (4 overs)		Deepti Sharma 41 (36); Shalini Sharma 1/8 (4 overs)

Uttar Pradesh won by 3 wickets
Jharkhand State Cricket Association Oval Ground, Ranchi
Umpires: Abhijit Bhattacharya and Indranil Chakravarti

- Baroda won the toss and elected to bat.

==== Semi-finals ====
13 January 2016
Scorecard

Mumbai; 126/7 (20 overs)	v	Himachal Pradesh; 100/9 (20 overs)
Sulakshana Naik 55 (56); Tanuja Kanwar 3/21 (4 overs)		Tanuja Kanwar 27 (27); Nancy Daruwalla 2/22 (4 overs)

Mumbai won by 26 runs
Jharkhand State Cricket Association Oval Ground, Ranchi
Umpires: Indranil Chakravarti and Mahanta Narayandev

- Mumbai won the toss and elected to bat.

13 January 2016
Scorecard

Uttar Pradesh; 123/6 (20 overs)	v	Andhra; 80/6 (20 overs)
Deepti Sharma 44 (49); Gadwal Saranya 2/18 (3 overs)		Neeragattu Anusha 29 (34); Samuya Singh 4/13 (4 overs)

Uttar Pradesh won by 43 runs
Jharkhand State Cricket Association Oval Ground, Ranchi
Umpires: Abhijit Bhattacharya and Mahanta Narayandev

- Uttar Pradesh won the toss and elected to bat.

==== Final ====
15 January 2016
Scorecard

Uttar Pradesh; 64 (18.2 overs)	v	Mumbai; 65/2 (17.2 overs)
Deepti Sharma 18 (37); Sheral Rozario 2/11 (4 overs)		Jemimah Rodrigues 30* (41); Zeenat Qureshi 1/13 (2 overs)

Mumbai won by 8 wickets
Jharkhand State Cricket Association Oval Ground, Ranchi
Umpires: Abhijit Bhattacharya and Indranil Chakravarti

- Uttar Pradesh won the toss and elected to bat.
- Mumbai and Uttar Pradesh are promoted to the Elite Group.

== Statistics ==
=== Most runs ===
Player	Team	Matches	Innings	Runs	Average	HS	100s	50s
Smriti Mandhana	Maharashtra	7	7	224	37.33	69*	0	1
Deepti Sharma	Uttar Pradesh	7	7	202	33.66	47	0	0
Thirush Kamini	Railways	7	7	196	28.00	61	0	1
Madhusmita Behera	Odisha	7	7	172	28.66	50	0	1
Sunanda Yetrekar	Goa	7	7	170	42.50	43*	0	0

Source: CricketArchive

=== Most wickets ===
Player	Team	Overs	Wickets	Average	BBI	5w
Rupali Chavan	Goa	26.0	13	7.92	3/8	0
Tarannum Pathan	Baroda	24.0	12	5.91	3/6	0
Devika Vaidya	Maharashtra	28.0	12	10.16	4/14	0
Deepti Sharma	Uttar Pradesh	25.0	11	9.90	4/9	0
Preeti Bose	Haryana	20.0	10	5.00	4/8	0

Source: CricketArchive
