= 2014–15 Senior Women's T20 League =

- Dates: 10 – 22 January 2015
- Administrator: BCCI
- Cricket format: Twenty20
- Tournament format: Round-robin
- Champions: Railways (6th title)
- Runners-up: Maharashtra
- Participants: 26
- Matches: 66
- Most runs: Harmanpreet Kaur (262)
- Most wickets: Devika Vaidya (14)

The 2014–15 Senior Women's T20 League was the 7th edition of the women's Twenty20 cricket competition in India. It took place in January 2015 with 26 teams divided into an Elite Group and a Plate Group. Railways won the tournament, their sixth in a row, by topping the Elite Group Super League.

== Competition format ==
The 26 teams competing in the tournament were divided into the Elite Group and the Plate Group, with the 10 teams in the Elite Group further divided into Groups A and B and the 16 teams in the Plate Group into Groups A, B and C. The tournament operated on a round-robin format, with each team playing every other team in their group once. The top two sides from each Elite Group progressed to the Elite Group Super League, which was a further round-robin group, with the winner of the group being crowned Champions. The bottom side from each Elite Group was relegated to the Plate Group for the following season. Meanwhile, the top two from each Plate Group progressed to a knockout stage, with the two teams that reached the final being promoted for the following season, as well as playing off for the Plate Group title. Matches were played using a Twenty20 format.

The groups worked on a points system with positions with the groups based on the total points. Points were awarded as follows:

Win: 4 points.
Tie: 2 points.
Loss: 0 points.
No Result/Abandoned: 2 points.

If points in the final table were equal, teams were separated by most wins, then head-to-head record, then Net Run Rate.

== Elite Group ==
=== Elite Group A ===
Team	P	W	L	T	NR	Pts	NRR
Railways (Q)	4	3	0	1	0	14	+1.538
Maharashtra (Q)	4	2	1	1	0	10	+0.905
Delhi	4	2	2	0	0	8	+0.159
Odisha	4	2	2	0	0	8	–0.535
Gujarat (R)	4	0	4	0	0	0	–2.141

=== Elite Group B ===
Team	P	W	L	T	NR	Pts	NRR
Punjab (Q)	4	4	0	0	0	16	+0.844
Madhya Pradesh (Q)	4	3	1	0	0	12	+0.363
Kerala	4	1	3	0	0	4	–0.198
Hyderabad	4	1	3	0	0	4	–0.433
Mumbai (R)	4	1	3	0	0	4	–0.541

=== Elite Group Super League ===
Team	P	W	L	T	NR	Pts	NRR
Railways (C)	3	3	0	0	0	12	+1.356
Maharashtra	3	2	1	0	0	8	+0.628
Madhya Pradesh	3	1	2	0	0	4	–0.696
Punjab	3	0	3	0	0	0	–1.134

Source: CricketArchive

== Plate Group ==
=== Plate Group A ===
Team	P	W	L	T	NR	Pts	NRR
Karnataka (Q)	5	5	0	0	0	20	+1.508
Goa (Q)	5	3	2	0	0	12	+0.542
Saurashtra	5	3	2	0	0	12	–0.164
Haryana	5	3	2	0	0	12	–0.236
Jharkhand	5	1	4	0	0	4	–0.597
Tripura	5	0	5	0	0	0	–0.991

=== Plate Group B ===
Team	P	W	L	T	NR	Pts	NRR
Assam (Q)	4	4	0	0	0	16	+1.187
Himachal Pradesh (Q)	4	3	1	0	0	12	+0.180
Rajasthan	4	2	2	0	0	8	+0.560
Tamil Nadu	4	1	3	0	0	4	+0.039
Jammu and Kashmir	4	0	4	0	0	0	–1.973

=== Plate Group C ===
Team	P	W	L	T	NR	Pts	NRR
Bengal (Q)	4	3	1	0	0	12	+2.450
Andhra (Q)	4	3	1	0	0	12	+0.327
Uttar Pradesh	4	3	1	0	0	12	–0.104
Vidarbha	4	1	3	0	0	4	–1.061
Baroda	4	0	4	0	0	0	–1.717

Advanced to Plate Group Semi-finals
Advanced to Plate Group Quarter-finals

Source: CricketArchive

=== Knockout stage ===
Quarter-finals
B2	Himachal Pradesh	72/6
C1	Bengal	73/3
C2	Andhra	79/5
A2	Goa	80/2

Semi-finals
C1	Bengal	101
A1	Karnataka	88/9
B1	Assam	62
A2	Goa	63/6

Final
C1	Bengal	79/9
A2	Goa	80/7

==== Quarter-finals ====
19 January 2015
Scorecard

Himachal Pradesh; 72/6 (20 overs)	v	Bengal; 73/3 (15.2 overs)
Tanuja Kanwar 17* (13); Trisha Bera 2/11 (4 overs)		Paramita Roy 35* (44); Sapna Randhawa 2/17 (3 overs)

Bengal won by 7 wickets
Eden Gardens, Kolkata
Umpires: Ganesh Charhate and Kusha Kassibatta

- Bengal won the toss and elected to field.

19 January 2015
Scorecard

Andhra; 79/5 (20 overs)	v	Goa; 80/2 (17 overs)
Ravi Kalpana 28* (48); Shikha Pandey 2/12 (4 overs)		Sunanda Yetrekar 36* (51); Rama Devi 1/15 (4 overs)

Goa won by 8 wickets
Jadavpur University Campus Ground, Kolkata
Umpires: Rajesh Timaney and Akshay Totre

- Andhra won the toss and elected to bat.

==== Semi-finals ====
20 January 2015
Scorecard

Bengal; 101 (20 overs)	v	Karnataka; 88/9 (20 overs)
Dipali Shaw 29 (33); Krishnappa Rakshitha 3/14 (4 overs)		Karu Jain 36 (47); Gayatri Mal 3/13 (4 overs)

Bengal won by 13 runs
Eden Gardens, Kolkata
Umpires: Ganesh Charhate and Akshay Totre

- Bengal won the toss and elected to bat.

20 January 2015
Scorecard

Assam; 62 (19.4 overs)	v	Goa; 63/6 (19.1 overs)
Ritu Dhrub 16 (33); Shikha Pandey 3/14 (4 overs)		Shikha Pandey 26* (38); Monika Das 2/11 (4 overs)

Goa won by 4 wickets
Jadavpur University Campus Ground, Kolkata
Umpires: Kusha Kassibatta and Rajesh Timaney

- Goa won the toss and elected to field.

==== Final ====
22 January 2015
Scorecard

Bengal; 79/9 (20 overs)	v	Goa; 80/7 (20 overs)
Paramita Roy 25 (39); Santoshi Rane 3/9 (4 overs)		Salma Divkar 31* (30); Jhulan Goswami 3/6 (4 overs)

Goa won by 3 wickets
Eden Gardens, Kolkata
Umpires: Ganesh Charhate and Kusha Kassibata

- Bengal won the toss and elected to bat.
- Goa and Bengal are promoted to the Elite Group.

== Statistics ==
=== Most runs ===
Player	Team	Matches	Innings	Runs	Average	HS	100s	50s
Harmanpreet Kaur	Railways	7	6	262	131.00	81*	0	3
Smriti Mandhana	Maharashtra	7	7	229	76.33	59*	0	1
Varsha Choudhary	Madhya Pradesh	7	7	222	37.00	50*	0	1
Vellaswamy Vanitha	Karnataka	6	6	195	32.50	60	0	2
Jhulan Goswami	Bengal	7	7	192	32.00	63	0	1

Source: CricketArchive

=== Most wickets ===
Player	Team	Overs	Wickets	Average	BBI	5w
Devika Vaidya	Maharashtra	28.0	14	10.35	4/19	0
Rupali Chavan	Goa	28.0	13	7.76	5/7	1
Trisha Bera	Bengal	28.0	12	7.33	3/6	0
Rajeshwari Gayakwad	Karnataka	24.0	12	7.58	3/11	0
Shubhlakshmi Sharma	Railways	25.3	10	7.80	3/13	0

Source: CricketArchive
