= 2010–11 Senior Women's T20 League =

- Dates: 13 January – 4 February 2011
- Administrator(s): BCCI
- Cricket format: Twenty20
- Tournament format(s): Round-robin
- Champions: Railways (2nd title)
- Runners-up: Bengal
- Participants: 26
- Matches: 76
- Most runs: Mamatha Kanojia (283)
- Most wickets: Annyesha Maitra (14); Poonam Jagtap (14); Seema Pujare (14)

The 2010–11 Senior Women's T20 League was the 3rd edition of the women's Twenty20 cricket competition in India. It took place in January and February 2011, with 26 teams divided into five regional groups. Railways won the tournament, their second in a row, beating Bengal in the final.

== Competition format ==
The 26 teams competing in the tournament were divided into five zonal groups: Central, East, North, South and West. The tournament operated on a round-robin format, with each team playing every other team in their group once. The top two sides from each group progressed to the Super League round, where the 10 remaining teams were divided into two further round-robin groups. The winner of each group progressed to the final. Matches were played using a Twenty20 format.

The groups worked on a points system with positions with the groups being based on the total points. Points were awarded as follows:

Win: 4 points.
Tie: 2 points.
Loss: 0 points.
No Result/Abandoned: 2 points.

If points in the final table are equal, teams are separated by most wins, then head-to-head record, then Net Run Rate.

== Zonal Tables ==
=== Central Zone ===
Team	P	W	L	T	NR	Pts	NRR
Uttar Pradesh (Q)	4	4	0	0	0	16	+0.936
Railways (Q)	4	3	1	0	0	12	+2.091
Madhya Pradesh	4	2	2	0	0	8	–0.700
Rajasthan	4	1	3	0	0	4	–1.128
Vidarbha	4	0	4	0	0	0	–1.236

=== East Zone ===
Team	P	W	L	T	NR	Pts	NRR
Bengal (Q)	4	3	1	0	0	12	+1.212
Assam (Q)	4	3	1	0	0	12	+0.416
Jharkhand	4	2	2	0	0	8	–0.005
Orissa	4	2	2	0	0	8	–0.676
Tripura	4	0	4	0	0	0	–1.028

=== North Zone ===
Team	P	W	L	T	NR	Pts	NRR
Delhi (Q)	4	4	0	0	0	16	+0.901
Punjab (Q)	4	3	1	0	0	12	+0.867
Haryana	4	1	2	1	0	6	–0.357
Himachal Pradesh	4	1	2	1	0	6	–0.416
Jammu and Kashmir	4	0	4	0	0	0	–1.025

=== South Zone ===
Team	P	W	L	T	NR	Pts	NRR
Hyderabad (Q)	5	5	0	0	0	20	+1.881
Karnataka (Q)	5	3	1	1	0	14	+1.136
Goa	5	3	2	0	0	12	–0.028
Tamil Nadu	5	2	2	1	0	10	+0.440
Kerala	5	1	4	0	0	4	–1.706
Andhra	5	0	5	0	0	0	–1.644

=== West Zone ===
Team	P	W	L	T	NR	Pts	NRR
Mumbai (Q)	4	4	0	0	0	16	+1.268
Maharashtra (Q)	4	2	1	1	0	10	+0.998
Saurashtra	4	1	2	1	0	6	–0.921
Gujarat	4	1	3	0	0	4	–0.961
Baroda	4	0	2	2	0	4	–0.348

Source:CricketArchive

== Super Leagues ==
=== Super League Group A ===
Team	P	W	L	T	NR	Pts	NRR
Bengal (Q)	4	4	0	0	0	16	+1.047
Maharashtra	4	2	2	0	0	8	+0.334
Uttar Pradesh	4	2	2	0	0	8	–0.078
Punjab	4	2	2	0	0	8	–0.432
Karnataka	4	0	4	0	0	0	–0.890

=== Super League Group B ===
Team	P	W	L	T	NR	Pts	NRR
Railways (Q)	4	4	0	0	0	16	+3.244
Hyderabad	4	3	1	0	0	12	+0.203
Delhi	4	2	2	0	0	8	+0.712
Assam	4	1	3	0	0	4	–2.207
Mumbai	4	0	4	0	0	0	–1.669

Source:CricketArchive

== Final ==
4 February 2011
Scorecard

Bengal; 99/7 (20 overs)	v	Railways; 100/3 (18.5 overs)
Ananya Mitra 31* (41); Amita Sharma 2/13 (4 overs)		Mithali Raj 44* (41); Annyesha Maitra 2/16 (4 overs)

Railways won by 7 wickets
Sawai Mansingh Stadium, Jaipur
Umpires: Sankara Dendapani and Nitin Pai

- Bengal won the toss and elected to bat.

== Statistics ==
=== Most runs ===
Player	Team	Matches	Innings	Runs	Average	HS	100s	50s
Mamatha Kanojia	Hyderabad	9	9	283	47.16	57*	0	2
Mithali Raj	Railways	5	4	232	232.00	85*	0	2
Devieka Sathe	Assam	8	8	200	28.57	84*	0	1
Karu Jain	Karnataka	9	9	195	48.75	46*	0	0
Nidhi Torvi	Hyderabad	9	9	193	21.44	39	0	0

Source: CricketArchive

=== Most wickets ===
Player	Team	Overs	Wickets	Average	BBI	5w
Annyesha Maitra	Bengal	33.0	14	7.71	3/6	0
Poonam Jagtap	Maharashtra	32.0	14	8.92	3/11	0
Seema Pujare	Mumbai	29.4	14	9.28	3/7	0
Ananya Upendran	Hyderabad	25.0	13	9.28	3/7	0
Shilpa Gupta	Delhi	29.0	12	8.66	3/14	0

Source: CricketArchive
