= 2007–08 Senior Women's One Day League =

- Dates: 12 September – 18 November 2007
- Administrator: BCCI
- Cricket format: List A
- Tournament format(s): Round-robin and knockouts
- Champions: Railways (2nd title)
- Runners-up: Maharashtra
- Participants: 27
- Matches: 69
- Most runs: Mithali Raj (356)
- Most wickets: Raju Goyal (17)

The 2007–08 Senior Women's One Day League was the 2nd edition of the women's List A cricket competition in India. It took place from September to November 2007, with 27 teams divided into five regional groups. Railways won the tournament, beating Maharashtra in the final, claiming their second One Day League title.

== Competition format ==
The 27 teams competing in the tournament were divided into five zonal groups: Central, East, North, South and West. The tournament operated on a round-robin format, with each team playing every other team in their group once. The top two sides from each group progressed to the knockout stages. Matches were played using a 50 over format.

The groups worked on a points system with positions with the groups being based on the total points. Points were awarded as follows:

Win: 4 points.
Tie: 2 points.
Loss: –1 points.
No Result/Abandoned: 2 points.
Bonus Points: 1 point available per match.
Consolation Points: 1 point available per match.

If points in the final table are equal, teams are separated by most wins, then head-to-head record, then number of Bonus Points, then Net Run Rate.

== Zonal Tables ==
=== Central Zone ===
Team	P	W	L	T	NR	BP	CP	Pts	NRR
Railways (Q)	4	4	0	0	0	4	0	20	+3.159
Madhya Pradesh (Q)	4	3	1	0	0	3	0	14	+1.673
Uttar Pradesh	4	2	2	0	0	2	0	8	+0.862
Vidarbha	4	1	3	0	0	1	0	2	–1.557
Rajasthan	4	0	4	0	0	0	0	–4	–3.980

=== East Zone ===
Team	P	W	L	T	NR	BP	CP	Pts	NRR
Bengal (Q)	5	4	0	0	1	4	0	22	+2.902
Jharkhand (Q)	5	3	1	0	1	3	0	16	+1.585
Orissa	5	3	1	0	1	3	0	16	+0.630
Sikkim	5	1	3	0	1	1	0	4	–0.762
Tripura	5	1	3	0	1	0	0	3	–1.588
Assam	5	0	4	0	1	0	1	–1	–2.207

=== North Zone ===
Team	P	W	L	T	NR	BP	CP	Pts	NRR
Delhi (Q)	4	4	0	0	0	4	0	20	+2.372
Punjab (Q)	4	3	1	0	0	3	0	14	+1.441
Haryana	4	2	2	0	0	2	0	8	–0.216
Himachal Pradesh	4	1	3	0	0	1	0	2	–1.300
Jammu and Kashmir	4	0	4	0	0	0	0	–4	–2.231

=== South Zone ===
Team	P	W	L	T	NR	BP	CP	Pts	NRR
Tamil Nadu (Q)	5	3	0	0	2	3	0	19	+2.211
Hyderabad (Q)	5	3	0	0	2	3	0	19	+1.613
Karnataka	5	3	1	0	1	3	0	16	+2.134
Goa	5	1	3	0	1	1	0	4	–0.817
Kerala	5	1	3	0	1	0	0	3	–1.693
Andhra	5	0	4	0	1	0	1	–1	–2.831

=== West Zone ===
Team	P	W	L	T	NR	BP	CP	Pts	NRR
Maharashtra(Q)	4	4	0	0	0	3	0	19	+2.689
Mumbai (Q)	4	3	1	0	0	3	1	15	+3.046
Gujarat	4	2	2	0	0	0	0	6	–1.034
Baroda	4	1	3	0	0	0	1	2	–1.844
Saurashtra	4	0	4	0	0	0	2	–2	–2.069

Advanced to Quarter-Finals.
Advanced to Pre-Quarter-Finals.

Source:CricketArchive

== Knockout stage ==
Pre-Quarter-finals
N1	Delhi	160
C2	Madhya Pradesh	144
N2	Punjab	144
W1	Mumbai	145/8

Quarter-finals
W1	Maharashtra	169
N1	Delhi	153
S2	Hyderabad	169/9
E1	Bengal	170/7
C1	Railways	230/4
W2	Mumbai	126/6
S1	Tamil Nadu	118/9
E2	Jharkhand	84

Semi-finals
W1	Maharashtra	147
E1	Bengal	146
S1	Tamil Nadu	141/9
C1	Railways	142/3

Final
W1	Maharashtra	127/7
C1	Railways	131/1

=== Pre-Quarter-finals ===
12 November 2007
Scorecard

Delhi; 160 (50 overs)	v	Madhya Pradesh; 144 (47.3 overs)
Anjum Chopra 44 (86); Revati Joshi 4/19 (7 overs)		Revati Joshi 47 (113); Shashi Malik 4/26 (10 overs)

Delhi won by 16 runs
Rajiv Gandhi International Cricket Stadium, Hyderabad
Umpires: R Manoj Kumar and P Surya Prakash

- Delhi won the toss and elected to bat.

12 November 2007
Scorecard

Punjab; 144 (45.4 overs)	v	Mumbai; 145/8 (49.1 overs)
Anureet Kaur 52 (102); Seema Pujare 3/13 (7 overs)		Neelima Patil 35* (50); Harmanpreet Kaur 2/31 (10 overs)

Mumbai won by 2 wickets
Railways Recreation Club Ground, Secunderabad
Umpires: R Kameshwar Rao and Chettithody Shamshuddin

- Punjab won the toss and elected to bat.

=== Quarter-finals ===
14 November 2007
Scorecard

Maharashtra; 169 (48.1 overs)	v	Delhi; 153 (47.5 overs)
Devika Palshikar 50 (87); Dipti Dhyani 2/28 (10 overs)		Latika Kumari 31 (46); Trupti Khot 3/30 (10 overs)

Maharashtra won by 16 runs
Nuclear Fuel Complex Ground, Secunderabad
Umpires: R Kameshwar Rao and Krishna Prakash

- Maharashtra won the toss and elected to bat.

14 November 2007
Scorecard

Hyderabad; 169/9 (50 overs)	v	Bengal; 170/7 (48.5 overs)
Vani Viola 69 (132); Beas Sarkar 4/21 (10 overs)		Ritu Roy 61 (124); Gouher Sultana 2/22 (10 overs)

Bengal won by 3 wickets
Rajiv Gandhi International Cricket Stadium, Hyderabad
Umpires: R Manoj Kumar and Sujith Krishna

- Hyderabad won the toss and elected to bat.

14 November 2007
Scorecard

Railways; 230/4 (50 overs)	v	Mumbai; 126/6 (50 overs)
Mithali Raj 113* (133); Seema Pujare 2/39 (10 overs)		Punam Raut 65* (151); Reema Malhotra 2/32 (8 overs)

Railways won by 104 runs
Railways Recreation Club Ground, Secunderabad
Umpires: Chettithody Shamshuddin and B Srinivas

- Railways won the toss and elected to bat.

14 November 2007
Scorecard

Jharkhand; 118/9 (50 overs)	v	Tamil Nadu; 84 (39 overs)
Thirush Kamini 27 (18); Deepa Jha 3/28 (10 overs)		Seema Desai 16* (61); Thirush Kamini 3/6 (5 overs)

Tamil Nadu won by 34 runs
Electronic Corporation of India Limited Ground, Hyderabad
Umpires: V Chandraiah and P Surya Prakash

- Jharkhand won the toss and elected to field.

=== Semi-finals ===
16 November 2007
Scorecard

Maharashtra; 147 (47.3 overs)	v	Bengal; 146 (49.3 overs)
Amrita Shinde 91* (118); Priyanka Roy 2/23 (10 overs)		Priyanka Roy 45 (48); Swaroopa Kadam 2/16 (10 overs)

Maharashtra won by 1 run
Rajiv Gandhi International Cricket Stadium, Hyderabad
Umpires: K Kusha Prakash and Sujith Krishna

- Bengal won the toss and elected to field.

16 November 2007
Scorecard

Tamil Nadu; 141/9 (50 overs)	v	Railways; 142/3 (36.4 overs)
Nagarajan Niranjana 37 (74); Reema Malhotra 4/24 (7 overs)		Mithali Raj 62 (96); Nagarajan Niranjana 3/32 (10 overs)

Railways won by 7 wickets
Railways Recreation Club Ground, Secunderabad
Umpires: Chettithody Shamshuddin and R Manoj Kumar

- Tamil Nadu won the toss and elected to bat.

=== Final ===
18 November 2007
Scorecard

Maharashtra; 127/7 (50 overs)	v	Railways; 131/1 (34.3 overs)
Devika Palshikar 45 (109); Amita Sharma 3/6 (8 overs)		Jaya Sharma 62* (122)

Railways won by 9 wickets
Rajiv Gandhi International Cricket Stadium, Hyderabad
Umpires: R Kameshwar Rao and P Surya Prakash

- Maharashtra won the toss and elected to bat.

== Statistics ==
=== Most runs ===
Player	Team	Matches	Innings	Runs	Average	HS	100s	50s
Mithali Raj	Railways	7	5	356	356.00	113*	2	1
Monica Sumra	Mumbai	6	6	231	46.20	107	1	1
Amrita Shinde	Maharashtra	7	7	222	44.40	91	0	2
Jaya Sharma	Railways	7	7	208	69.33	62*	0	2
Punam Raut	Mumbai	6	6	208	41.60	65*	0	2

Source: CricketArchive

=== Most wickets ===
Player	Team	Overs	Wickets	Average	BBI	5w
Raju Goyal	Mumbai	54.2	17	9.70	6/11	1
Shashi Malik	Delhi	55.3	16	7.81	4/10	0
Reema Malhotra	Railways	43.4	14	9.14	4/24	0
Madhusmita Behera	Orissa	32.1	13	6.07	4/14	0
Ravneet Kaur	Punjab	44.5	13	9.69	5/2	1

Source: CricketArchive
