= Inter-State Women's Competition =

Inter State Women's Competition
- Countries: India
- Administrator: BCCI
- Format: First-class (2-day matches)
- First edition: 2007–08
- Latest edition: 2008–09
- Tournament format: Round-robin and knockouts
- Number of teams: 28
- Most successful: Railways (2 titles)

The Inter State Women's Competition was a women's cricket first-class domestic competition organised by the Board of Control for Cricket in India. The competition took place twice, in 2007–08 and 2008–09, with teams competing in two-day matches across five zonal divisions before a knockout stage. Railways were the most successful team in the competition, winning both tournaments.

The tournament ran alongside the Senior Women's One Day League in 2007–08 and both the One Day League and the Senior Women's T20 League in 2008–09, before the tournament was discontinued in favour of the other two formats. Women's first-class cricket was revived in India in 2014–15, with the Senior Women's Cricket Inter Zonal Three Day Game.

== Competition format ==
Teams in the Inter State Women's Competition were divided into five zonal groups, playing each other once in a round-robin format. The top two in each group progressed to the knockout stages. The top team from each group, and the best second-placed team, progressed straight to the quarter-finals whilst the other four second-placed teams played-off in the pre-quarter finals.

Matches were played using a two-day format, with the first innings limited to 90 overs per side. 5 points were awarded for a win, and 3 points awarded for a first innings lead in a drawn match. In the knockout stages, if a match was drawn the side that lead on first innings progressed to the next stage.

== Teams ==
Central Zone	Madhya Pradesh; Railways; Rajasthan; Uttar Pradesh; Vidarbha
East Zone	Assam; Bengal; Jharkhand; Manipur (Note: Manipur only competed in the 2008–09 season.); Odisha; Sikkim; Tripura
North Zone	Delhi; Haryana; Himachal Pradesh; Jammu and Kashmir; Punjab
South Zone	Andhra; Goa; Hyderabad; Karnataka; Kerala; Tamil Nadu
West Zone	Baroda; Gujarat; Maharashtra; Mumbai; Saurashtra

== Seasons ==
=== 2007–08 ===
The tournament began in the 2007–08 season, taking place from 10 September to 2 December 2007. Railways were the inaugural winners of the tournament, beating Maharashtra in the final on first innings lead. The knockout stages were as follows:

Pre-Quarter-finals
C2	Madhya Pradesh	207/9
S2	Tamil Nadu	147
N2	Punjab	343/4
E2	Odisha	107

Quarter-finals
C2	Madhya Pradesh	136 & 40/5
W1	Maharashtra	136
N1	Delhi	294/9
E1	Bengal	277
C1	Railways	384/2
N2	Punjab	208
W2	Mumbai	151 & 45/1
S1	Karnataka	163/7

Semi-finals
N1	Delhi	161
W1	Maharashtra	188/7
C1	Railways	436/5
S1	Karnataka	60 & 108/6

Final
W1	Maharashtra	234
C1	Railways	296/3

=== 2008–09 ===
The second edition of the tournament took place from 1 January to 14 February 2009. Railways retained their title, beating Madhya Pradesh in the final on first innings lead. The knockout stages were as follows:

Pre-Quarter-finals
N1	Delhi	144 & 78/2
W2	Mumbai	96
C2	Madhya Pradesh	217/7d & 35
N2	Himachal Pradesh	73 & 68

Quarter-finals
C1	Railways	166 & 58/3
N1	Delhi	130
E1	Bengal	135
S2	Karnataka	136/7
C2	Madhya Pradesh	223
W1	Maharashtra	163
E2	Jharkhand	142 & 48/3
S1	Hyderabad	132

Semi-finals
C1	Railways	303/8d
S2	Karnataka	209
C2	Madhya Pradesh	128 & 32/1
E2	Jharkhand	79

Final
C2	Madhya Pradesh	174
C1	Railways	189/5

== Tournament results ==
Season	Winner	Runner up	Leading run-scorer	Leading wicket-taker	Refs
2007–08	Railways	Maharashtra	Mithali Raj (Railways) 950	Swaroopa Kadam (Maharashtra) 34	
2008–09	Railways	Madhya Pradesh	Arpita Ghosh (Bengal) 486	Reema Malhotra (Delhi) 30	
