= 2012–13 Senior Women's T20 League =

- Dates: 22 February – 14 March 2013
- Administrator(s): BCCI
- Cricket format: Twenty20
- Tournament format(s): Round-robin
- Champions: Railways (4th title)
- Runners-up: Hyderabad
- Participants: 26
- Matches: 76
- Most runs: Smriti Mandhana (311)
- Most wickets: Sneh Rana (17)

The 2012–13 Senior Women's T20 League was the 5th edition of the women's Twenty20 cricket competition in India. It took place in February and March 2013 with 26 teams divided into five regional groups. Railways won the tournament, their fourth in a row, beating Hyderabad in the final.

== Competition format ==
The 26 teams competing in the tournament were divided into five zonal groups: Central, East, North, South and West. The tournament operated on a round-robin format, with each team playing every other team in their group once. The top two sides from each group progressed to the Super League round, where the 10 remaining teams were divided into two further round-robin groups. The winner of each group progressed to the final. Matches were played using a Twenty20 format.

The groups worked on a points system with positions with the groups being based on the total points. Points were awarded as follows:

Win: 4 points.
Tie: 2 points.
Loss: 0 points.
No Result/Abandoned: 2 points.

If points in the final table are equal, teams are separated by most wins, then head-to-head record, then Net Run Rate.

== Zonal Tables ==
=== Central Zone ===
Team	P	W	L	T	NR	Pts	NRR
Railways (Q)	4	3	0	0	1	14	+2.524
Madhya Pradesh (Q)	4	2	2	0	0	8	–0.228
Rajasthan	4	2	2	0	0	8	–0.748
Uttar Pradesh	4	1	1	0	2	8	+0.891
Vidarbha	4	0	3	0	1	2	–1.517

=== East Zone ===
Team	P	W	L	T	NR	Pts	NRR
Assam (Q)	4	4	0	0	0	16	+0.593
Odisha (Q)	4	3	1	0	0	12	+0.990
Bengal	4	2	2	0	0	8	+0.687
Tripura	4	1	3	0	0	4	–0.910
Jharkhand	4	0	4	0	0	0	–1.349

=== North Zone ===
Team	P	W	L	T	NR	Pts	NRR
Punjab (Q)	4	4	0	0	0	16	+1.636
Haryana (Q)	4	3	1	0	0	12	–0.094
Delhi	4	2	2	0	0	8	–0.541
Himachal Pradesh	4	1	3	0	0	4	–0.278
Jammu and Kashmir	4	0	4	0	0	0	–0.874

=== South Zone ===
Team	P	W	L	T	NR	Pts	NRR
Hyderabad (Q)	5	4	1	0	0	16	+1.067
Kerala (Q)	5	4	1	0	0	16	+0.357
Karnataka	5	3	2	0	0	12	+0.531
Tamil Nadu	5	3	2	0	0	12	+0.059
Andhra	5	1	4	0	0	4	–0.012
Goa	5	0	5	0	0	0	–2.047

=== West Zone ===
Team	P	W	L	T	NR	Pts	NRR
Maharashtra (Q)	4	4	0	0	0	16	+3.817
Gujarat (Q)	4	2	2	0	0	8	+0.088
Mumbai	4	2	2	0	0	8	–1.150
Baroda	4	1	3	0	0	4	–0.979
Saurashtra	4	1	3	0	0	4	–1.312

Source:CricketArchive

== Super Leagues ==
=== Super League Group A ===
Team	P	W	L	T	NR	Pts	NRR
Railways (Q)	4	4	0	0	0	16	+2.310
Punjab	4	2	2	0	0	8	–0.663
Gujarat	4	2	2	0	0	8	–1.017
Assam	4	1	3	0	0	4	–0.084
Kerala	4	1	3	0	0	4	–0.647

=== Super League Group B ===
Team	P	W	L	T	NR	Pts	NRR
Hyderabad (Q)	4	4	0	0	0	16	+1.161
Maharashtra	4	3	1	0	0	12	+0.443
Madhya Pradesh	4	2	2	0	0	8	–0.900
Haryana	4	1	3	0	0	4	–0.174
Odisha	4	0	4	0	0	0	–0.545

Source:CricketArchive

== Final ==
14 March 2013
Scorecard

Railways; 153/4 (20 overs)	v	Hyderabad; 93/6 (20 overs)
Mithali Raj 64* (55); Diana David 1/25 (3 overs)		Mamatha Kanojia 33 (43); Gouher Sultana 2/18 (4 overs)

Railways won by 60 runs
Pune Club Ground, Pune
Umpires: Arun Basa and Premdip Chatterjee

- Hyderabad won the toss and elected to field.

== Statistics ==
=== Most runs ===
Player	Team	Matches	Innings	Runs	Average	HS	100s	50s
Smriti Mandhana	Maharashtra	8	8	311	51.83	96*	0	2
Mithali Raj	Railways	8	7	289	289.00	64*	0	2
Harmanpreet Kaur	Punjab	8	8	238	47.60	79	0	2
Anagha Deshpande	Maharashtra	8	8	237	39.50	80	0	1
Amita Sharma	Railways	8	7	232	58.00	63*	0	2

Source: CricketArchive

=== Most wickets ===
Player	Team	Overs	Wickets	Average	BBI	5w
Sneh Rana	Punjab	28.0	17	8.52	5/17	1
Sobhana Asha	Kerala	36.0	14	10.78	3/8	0
Nidhi Buley	Madhya Pradesh	29.3	13	10.00	3/18	0
Sravanthi Naidu	Hyderabad	35.5	12	15.50	3/13	0
Amita Sharma	Railways	29.1	11	11.18	3/13	0

Source: CricketArchive
