= 2020–21 Senior Women's One Day Trophy =

2020–21 Women's Senior One Day Trophy
- Dates: 11 March – 4 April 2021
- Administrator: BCCI
- Cricket format: List A
- Tournament format(s): Round-robin and knockout
- Champions: Railways (12th title)
- Runners-up: Jharkhand
- Participants: 37
- Matches: 104
- Most runs: Indrani Roy (456)
- Most wickets: Sneh Rana (18)

The 2020–21 Women's Senior One Day Trophy was the 15th edition of the women's List A cricket competition in India. It took place from 11 March to 4 April 2021, with teams competing in round-robin divisions before a knockout stage. Railways won the tournament, their 12th title, beating Jharkhand in the final.

== Competition format ==
The 37 teams competing in the tournament were divided into the Elite Group and the Plate Group, with the teams in the Elite Group further divided into Groups A, B, C, D and E. Each group took place in one host city, under COVID-19 protocols. The winner of each Elite Group progressed to the quarter-finals, along with the best two second-placed teams. The final quarter-final spot was filled by the winner of a play-off between the third-best second-place side and the winner of the Plate Group. The top two teams in the Plate Group were promoted to the Elite Group for the following season, with the two lowest-ranked sides across the Elite Groups being relegated.

The groups worked on a points system with positions within the groups based on the total points of each team. Points were awarded as follows:

Win: 4 points.
Tie: 2 points.
Loss: 0 points.
No Result/Abandoned: 2 points.

If points in the final table were equal, teams were separated by first most wins, then by head-to-head record, then Net Run Rate.

== League stage ==
=== Points tables ===
==== Elite Group A ====
Team	P	W	L	T	NR	Pts	NRR
Jharkhand (Q)	5	4	1	0	0	16	+0.728
Odisha (PO)	5	4	1	0	0	16	+0.704
Hyderabad	5	3	2	0	0	12	+0.376
Gujarat	5	2	3	0	0	8	–0.371
Chhattisgarh	5	1	4	0	0	4	–0.569
Tripura	5	1	4	0	0	4	–0.791

==== Elite Group B ====
Team	P	W	L	T	NR	Pts	NRR
Railways (Q)	5	5	0	0	0	20	+2.577
Bengal (Q)	5	4	1	0	0	16	+0.837
Haryana	5	3	2	0	0	12	–0.426
Saurashtra	5	1	4	0	0	4	–0.867
Assam	5	1	4	0	0	4	–0.940
Uttarakhand	5	1	4	0	0	4	–0.946

==== Elite Group C ====
Team	P	W	L	T	NR	Pts	NRR
Andhra (Q)	5	5	0	0	0	20	+0.961
Goa	5	3	2	0	0	12	+0.001
Uttar Pradesh	5	3	2	0	0	12	+0.538
Maharashtra	5	2	3	0	0	8	+0.202
Rajasthan	5	1	4	0	0	4	–1.152
Chandigarh	5	1	4	0	0	4	–0.606

==== Elite Group D ====
Team	P	W	L	T	NR	Pts	NRR
Madhya Pradesh (Q)	5	4	1	0	0	16	+1.595
Baroda	5	4	1	0	0	16	+0.531
Kerala	5	3	2	0	0	12	+0.791
Mumbai	5	3	2	0	0	12	+0.767
Punjab	5	1	4	0	0	4	–0.283
Nagaland (R)	5	0	5	0	0	0	–8.490

==== Elite Group E ====
Team	P	W	L	T	NR	Pts	NRR
Vidarbha (Q)	5	4	1	0	0	16	+0.632
Karnataka (Q)	5	4	1	0	0	16	+1.415
Delhi	5	3	2	0	0	12	+1.491
Tamil Nadu	5	2	3	0	0	8	+0.208
Himachal Pradesh	5	2	3	0	0	8	+0.023
Meghalaya (R)	5	0	5	0	0	0	–4.575

==== Plate Group ====
Team	P	W	L	T	NR	Pts	NRR
Mizoram (P)	6	5	1	0	0	20	+0.463
Pondicherry (P)	6	5	1	0	0	20	+1.386
Jammu and Kashmir	6	4	2	0	0	16	+0.793
Bihar	6	3	3	0	0	12	+0.188
Manipur	6	2	4	0	0	8	–0.116
Sikkim	6	2	4	0	0	8	–0.567
Arunachal Pradesh	6	0	6	0	0	0	–2.180

Source: BCCI

=== Fixtures ===
==== Elite Group A ====
Round	Scorecard	Date	Team 1	Team 2	Result
Round 1	Scorecard	12 March	Odisha	Jharkhand	Jharkhand won by 5 wickets
Round 1	Scorecard	12 March	Hyderabad	Gujarat	Hyderabad won by 85 runs
Round 1	Scorecard	12 March	Chhattisgarh	Tripura	Chhattisgarh won by 48 runs
Round 2	Scorecard	14 March	Hyderabad	Odisha	Odisha won by 9 wickets
Round 2	Scorecard	14 March	Jharkhand	Tripura	Jharkhand won by 69 runs
Round 2	Scorecard	14 March	Gujarat	Chhattisgarh	Gujarat won by 56 runs
Round 3	Scorecard	16 March	Chhattisgarh	Hyderabad	Hyderabad won by 5 wickets
Round 3	Scorecard	16 March	Gujarat	Jharkhand	Jharkhand won by 6 wickets
Round 3	Scorecard	16 March	Odisha	Tripura	Odisha won by 43 runs
Round 4	Scorecard	18 March	Tripura	Gujarat	Gujarat won by 7 wickets
Round 4	Scorecard	18 March	Chhattisgarh	Odisha	Odisha won by 5 wickets
Round 4	Scorecard	18 March	Hyderabad	Jharkhand	Hyderabad won by 27 runs
Round 5	Scorecard	20 March	Chhattisgarh	Jharkhand	Jharkhand won by 5 wickets
Round 5	Scorecard	20 March	Tripura	Hyderabad	Tripura won by 18 runs
Round 5	Scorecard	20 March	Gujarat	Odisha	Odisha won by 6 wickets

==== Elite Group B ====
Round	Scorecard	Date	Team 1	Team 2	Result
Round 1	Scorecard	12 March	Railways	Bengal	Railways won by 67 runs
Round 1	Scorecard	12 March	Saurashtra	Haryana	Haryana won by 8 wickets
Round 1	Scorecard	12 March	Assam	Uttarakhand	Uttarakhand won by 4 wickets
Round 2	Scorecard	14 March	Saurashtra	Bengal	Bengal won by 4 wickets
Round 2	Scorecard	14 March	Uttarakhand	Railways	Railways won by 8 wickets
Round 2	Scorecard	14 March	Haryana	Assam	Haryana won by 99 runs
Round 3	Scorecard	16 March	Assam	Saurashtra	Assam won by 6 runs
Round 3	Scorecard	16 March	Haryana	Railways	Railways won by 153 runs
Round 3	Scorecard	16 March	Bengal	Uttarakhand	Bengal won by 79 runs
Round 4	Scorecard	18 March	Uttarakhand	Haryana	Haryana won by 2 wickets
Round 4	Scorecard	18 March	Bengal	Assam	Bengal won by 53 runs
Round 4	Scorecard	18 March	Railways	Saurashtra	Railways won by 139 runs
Round 5	Scorecard	20 March	Assam	Railways	Railways won by 9 wickets
Round 5	Scorecard	20 March	Uttarakhand	Saurashtra	Saurashtra won by 4 wickets
Round 5	Scorecard	20 March	Bengal	Haryana	Bengal won by 90 runs

==== Elite Group C ====
Round	Scorecard	Date	Team 1	Team 2	Result
Round 1	Scorecard	12 March	Uttar Pradesh	Andhra	Andhra won by 2 wickets
Round 1	Scorecard	12 March	Maharashtra	Rajasthan	Maharashtra won by 59 runs
Round 1	Scorecard	12 March	Goa	Chandigarh	Goa won by 78 runs
Round 2	Scorecard	14 March	Uttar Pradesh	Maharashtra	Uttar Pradesh won by 13 runs
Round 2	Scorecard	14 March	Chandigarh	Andhra	Andhra won by 5 wickets
Round 2	Scorecard	14 March	Rajasthan	Goa	Goa won by 6 wickets
Round 3	Scorecard	16 March	Maharashtra	Goa	Maharashtra won by 55 runs
Round 3	Scorecard	16 March	Andhra	Rajasthan	Andhra won by 48 runs
Round 3	Scorecard	16 March	Uttar Pradesh	Chandigarh	Uttar Pradesh won by 16 runs
Round 4	Scorecard	18 March	Rajasthan	Chandigarh	Rajasthan won by 43 runs
Round 4	Scorecard	18 March	Uttar Pradesh	Goa	Goa won by 3 wickets
Round 4	Scorecard	18 March	Andhra	Maharashtra	Andhra won by 45 runs
Round 5	Scorecard	20 March	Andhra	Goa	Andhra won by 103 runs
Round 5	Scorecard	20 March	Maharashtra	Chandigarh	Chandigarh won by 3 wickets
Round 5	Scorecard	20 March	Uttar Pradesh	Rajasthan	Uttar Pradesh won by 135 runs

==== Elite Group D ====
Round	Scorecard	Date	Team 1	Team 2	Result
Round 1	Scorecard	13 March	Madhya Pradesh	Mumbai	Mumbai won by 3 wickets
Round 1	Scorecard	13 March	Kerala	Baroda	Baroda won by 2 wickets
Round 1	Scorecard	13 March	Nagaland	Punjab	Punjab won by 10 wickets
Round 2	Scorecard	15 March	Kerala	Mumbai	Kerala won by 47 runs
Round 2	Scorecard	15 March	Nagaland	Madhya Pradesh	Madhya Pradesh won by 10 wickets
Round 2	Scorecard	15 March	Baroda	Punjab	Baroda won by 64 runs
Round 3	Scorecard	17 March	Kerala	Punjab	Kerala won by 67 runs
Round 3	Scorecard	17 March	Madhya Pradesh	Baroda	Madhya Pradesh won by 98 runs
Round 3	Scorecard	17 March	Nagaland	Mumbai	Mumbai won by 10 wickets
Round 4	Scorecard	19 March	Nagaland	Baroda	Baroda won by 5 wickets
Round 4	Scorecard	19 March	Mumbai	Punjab	Mumbai won by 61 runs
Round 4	Scorecard	19 March	Madhya Pradesh	Kerala	Madhya Pradesh won by 98 runs (VJD Method)
Round 5	Scorecard	21 March	Madhya Pradesh	Punjab	Madhya Pradesh won by 10 runs
Round 5	Scorecard	21 March	Nagaland	Kerala	Kerala won by 9 wickets
Round 5	Scorecard	21 March	Mumbai	Baroda	Baroda won by 3 wickets

==== Elite Group E ====
Round	Scorecard	Date	Team 1	Team 2	Result
Round 1	Scorecard	13 March	Delhi	Karnataka	Karnataka won by 4 wickets
Round 1	Scorecard	13 March	Tamil Nadu	Himachal Pradesh	Tamil Nadu won by 94 runs
Round 1	Scorecard	13 March	Vidarbha	Meghalaya	Vidarbha won by 146 runs
Round 2	Scorecard	15 March	Himachal Pradesh	Delhi	Himachal Pradesh won by 10 runs
Round 2	Scorecard	15 March	Meghalaya	Karnataka	Karnataka won by 9 wickets
Round 2	Scorecard	15 March	Vidarbha	Tamil Nadu	Vidarbha won by 53 runs
Round 3	Scorecard	17 March	Vidarbha	Himachal Pradesh	Vidarbha won by 25 runs
Round 3	Scorecard	17 March	Karnataka	Tamil Nadu	Karnataka won by 86 runs
Round 3	Scorecard	17 March	Delhi	Meghalaya	Delhi won by 285 runs
Round 4	Scorecard	19 March	Meghalaya	Tamil Nadu	Tamil Nadu won by 6 wickets
Round 4	Scorecard	19 March	Delhi	Vidarbha	Delhi won by 70 runs
Round 4	Scorecard	19 March	Himachal Pradesh	Karnataka	Karnataka won by 4 wickets
Round 5	Scorecard	21 March	Vidarbha	Karnataka	Vidarbha won by 4 runs
Round 5	Scorecard	21 March	Meghalaya	Himachal Pradesh	Himachal Pradesh won by 10 wickets
Round 5	Scorecard	21 March	Tamil Nadu	Delhi	Delhi won by 6 wickets

==== Plate Group ====
Round	Scorecard	Date	Team 1	Team 2	Result
Round 1	Scorecard	11 March	Bihar	Pondicherry	Pondicherry won by 7 wickets
Round 1	Scorecard	11 March	Manipur	Jammu and Kashmir	Jammu and Kashmir won by 5 wickets
Round 1	Scorecard	11 March	Arunachal Pradesh	Sikkim	Sikkim won by 4 wickets
Round 2	Scorecard	13 March	Manipur	Pondicherry	Pondicherry won by 6 wickets
Round 2	Scorecard	13 March	Sikkim	Jammu and Kashmir	Jammu and Kashmir won by 6 wickets
Round 2	Scorecard	13 March	Arunachal Pradesh	Mizoram	Mizoram won by 7 wickets
Round 3	Scorecard	14 March	Sikkim	Pondicherry	Pondicherry won by 9 wickets
Round 3	Scorecard	14 March	Mizoram	Jammu and Kashmir	Mizoram won by 27 runs
Round 3	Scorecard	14 March	Bihar	Arunachal Pradesh	Bihar won by 64 runs
Round 4	Scorecard	16 March	Arunachal Pradesh	Pondicherry	Pondicherry won by 10 wickets
Round 4	Scorecard	16 March	Mizoram	Manipur	Mizoram won by 21 runs
Round 4	Scorecard	16 March	Bihar	Sikkim	Sikkim won by 2 wickets
Round 5	Scorecard	17 March	Jammu and Kashmir	Arunachal Pradesh	Jammu and Kashmir won by 157 runs
Round 5	Scorecard	17 March	Mizoram	Sikkim	Mizoram won by 4 runs
Round 5	Scorecard	17 March	Manipur	Bihar	Bihar won by 9 wickets
Round 6	Scorecard	19 March	Mizoram	Pondicherry	Mizoram won by 15 runs
Round 6	Scorecard	19 March	Jammu and Kashmir	Bihar	Jammu and Kashmir won by 38 runs
Round 6	Scorecard	19 March	Sikkim	Manipur	Manipur won by 7 wickets
Round 7	Scorecard	21 March	Jammu and Kashmir	Pondicherry	Pondicherry won by 10 wickets
Round 7	Scorecard	21 March	Mizoram	Bihar	Bihar won by 6 wickets
Round 7	Scorecard	21 March	Arunachal Pradesh	Manipur	Manipur won by 5 wickets

== Knockout stages ==
Play-off
A2	Odisha	157/4
P1	Mizoram	155/9

Quarter-finals
B1	Railways	274/7
A2	Odisha	206/9
D1	Madhya Pradesh	177
B2	Bengal	205
A1	Jharkhand	254/6
E2	Karnataka	234
C1	Andhra	218/6
E1	Vidarbha	169

Semi-finals
B1	Railways	254/4
B2	Bengal	250/6
A1	Jharkhand	216/7
C1	Andhra	189

Final
B1	Railways	169/3
A1	Jharkhand	167

=== Play-off ===
28 March 2021
Scorecard

Mizoram; 155/9 (50 overs)	v	Odisha; 157/4 (33.5 overs)
Buley Ruchita 44 (66); Sujata Malik 2/19 (8 overs)		Madhuri Mehta 90 (95); Irene 1/11 (3 overs)

Odisha won by 6 wickets
Saurashtra Cricket Association Stadium, Rajkot
Umpires: Nagaraj Ramesh and Pranav Joshi

- Odisha won the toss and elected to field.

=== Quarter-finals ===
29 March 2021
Scorecard

Jharkhand; 254/6 (50 overs)	v	Karnataka; 234 (46 overs)
Indrani Roy 86 (91); Akanksha Kohli 2/52 (9 overs)		Shubha Satheesh 68 (82); Dinesh Ashwani 4/26 (7 overs)

Jharkhand won by 20 runs
Saurashtra Cricket Association Stadium, Rajkot
Umpires: Anand Ovalekar and Prabhakar Rao

- Jharkhand won the toss and elected to bat.

29 March 2021
Scorecard

Railways; 274/7 (50 overs)	v	Odisha; 206/9 (50 overs)
Thirush Kamini 70 (96); Rameshwari Naik 2/50 (7 overs)		Madhusmita Behera 40 (46); Dayalan Hemalatha 4/62 (9 overs)

Railways won by 68 runs
Saurashtra Cricket Association Stadium B, Rajkot
Umpires: Abhijit Bengeri and Nagaraj Ramesh

- Railways won the toss and elected to bat.

30 March 2021
Scorecard

Andhra; 218/6 (50 overs)	v	Vidarbha; 169 (46.2 overs)
Neeragattu Anusha 52 (67); Disha Kasat 3/40 (10 overs)		Disha Kasat 52 (90); Challa Jhansi Lakshmi 5/26 (9.2 overs)

Andhra won by 49 runs
Saurashtra Cricket Association Stadium, Rajkot
Umpires: Anand Ovalekar and M Ashwin Kumar

- Andhra won the toss and elected to bat.

30 March 2021
Scorecard

Bengal; 205 (48.5 overs)	v	Madhya Pradesh; 177 (47.5 overs)
Deepti Sharma 94 (142); Varsha Choudhary 2/33 (10 overs)		Pooja Vastrakar 48 (51); Gouher Sultana 3/22 (9.5 overs)

Bengal won by 28 runs
Saurashtra Cricket Association Stadium B, Rajkot
Umpires: Abhijit Bengeri and Pranav Joshi

- Bengal won the toss and elected to bat.

=== Semi-finals ===
1 April 2021
Scorecard

Jharkhand; 216/7 (50 overs)	v	Andhra; 189 (48.3 overs)
Niral Rashmi 122* (139); Challa Jhansi Lakshmi 3/47 (9 overs)		PV Sudharani 57 (52); Mani Niharika 4/25 (10 overs)

Jharkhand won by 27 runs
Saurashtra Cricket Association Stadium B, Rajkot
Umpires: Anand Ovalekar and M Ashwin Kumar

- Jharkhand won the toss and elected to bat.

1 April 2021
Scorecard

Bengal; 250/6 (50 overs)	v	Railways; 254/4 (44 overs)
Deepti Sharma 113 (148); Ekta Bisht 2/60 (10 overs)		Punam Raut 69 (90); Dhara Gujjar 1/28 (6 overs)

Railways won by 6 wickets
Saurashtra Cricket Association Stadium, Rajkot
Umpires: Prabhakar Rao and Pranav Joshi

- Bengal won the toss and elected to bat.

=== Final ===
4 April 2021
Scorecard

Jharkhand; 167 (50 overs)	v	Railways; 169/3 (37 overs)
Indrani Roy 49 (77); Sneh Rana 3/33 (10 overs)		Punam Raut 59 (94); Ravinder Devyani 2/36 (10 overs)

Railways won by 7 wickets
Saurashtra Cricket Association Stadium, Rajkot
Umpires: M Ashwin Kumar and Prabhakar Rao

- Jharkhand won the toss and elected to bat.

== Statistics ==
=== Most runs ===
Player	Team	Matches	Innings	Runs	Average	HS	100s	50s
Indrani Roy	Jharkhand	8	8	456	76.00	130*	2	1
Challa Jhansi Lakshmi	Andhra	7	7	358	59.66	100*	1	2
Thirush Kamini	Railways	5	5	353	117.66	114*	1	3
Shubha Satheesh	Karnataka	6	6	346	86.50	85	0	4
Buley Ruchita	Mizoram	7	7	332	66.40	84*	0	3

Source: ESPNcricinfo

=== Most wickets ===
Player	Team	Overs	Wickets	Average	BBI	5w
Sneh Rana	Railways	71.3	18	12.66	6/32	1
Nupur Kohale	Vidarbha	51.1	16	9.62	4/19	0
Amruta Saran	Puducherry	54.5	16	11.43	5/11	1
Challa Jhansi Lakshmi	Andhra	54.4	15	14.26	5/26	1
Lalita Sharma	Delhi	50.0	14	8.42	5/22	1

Source: ESPNcricinfo
