= Senior Women's T20 Trophy =

Women's Twenty20 cricket tournament in India

- Countries: India
- Administrator: BCCI
- Format: Twenty20
- First edition: 2008–09
- Latest edition: 2025–26
- Next edition: 2026–27
- Tournament format: Round-robin and knockout
- Number of teams: 37
- Current champion: Maharashtra (1st title)
- Most successful: Railways (11 titles)
- Website: www.bcci.tv
- 2026–27

The Senior Women's T20 Trophy, previously known as the Senior Women's T20 League, is a women's Twenty20 cricket competition held in India. It began in the 2008–09 season, with 28 teams representing state cricket associations, whilst the most season, 2022–23, had 37 teams competing. Railways are the most successful team in the history of the competition, winning 11 titles, whilst Delhi, Punjab and Mumbai have won the competition once apiece.

== History ==
The tournament began in the 2008–09 season, as the Senior Women's T20 Trophy, running along the Inter State Women's Competition, which ended after that season, and the Senior Women's One Day League. The results of the first tournament are not recorded.

Railways are the first recorded winners of the tournament, as they beat Maharashtra in the final of the 2009–10 competition by 5 wickets. Railways went on to dominate the competition, winning the next seven titles.

Delhi were the team to end Railways' winning streak in the 2017–18 season, as they topped the Elite Group Super League on Net Run Rate over Maharashtra and Baroda. The following season, 2018–19, Punjab claimed their first title, beating Karnataka in the final by 4 runs. Ahead of the 2019–20 season, the tournament was renamed the Senior Women's T20 Trophy, and Railways reclaimed their title, beating Bengal in the final by 8 wickets. The tournament scheduled to take place in 2020–21 was cancelled due to the COVID-19 pandemic, with only the Senior Women's One Day League going ahead. The tournament resumed in 2021–22, with Railways winning their tenth title. Railways again won the tournament in 2022–23. Mumbai won their first title in 2023–24, defeating Uttarakhand in the final. Mumbai defended their title in 2024–25, defeating Bengal in the final.

== Competition format ==
The Senior Women's T20 League has used various formats over the years. In the first season, 2008–09, 28 teams competed in round-robin groups across five zones, Central, East, North, South and West, with the top two from each group advancing to the knockout stages.

The format was altered for the following season, 2009–10. 26 teams now competed (with Manipur and Sikkim departing), initially in the same zonal groups as the previous season but with the top two now advancing to two "Super Leagues" of five teams apiece, with the winners of these leagues advancing to the final. This format was retained until the end of the 2012–13 season.

For the 2013–14 season, the 26 teams were arranged into an Elite Group and a Plate Group, then further divided into Elite Groups A and B and Plate Groups A, B and C. The top two from each Plate Group went into a knockout round, with the two finalists playing for the Plate Group title whilst also both gaining promotion to the Elite Group for the following season. Meanwhile, the top two from each Elite Group went into a Super League of four teams, with the winner being crowned the Champions of the tournament. The format was retained until the end of the 2017–18, with the only adjustment being for the addition of Chhattisgarh ahead of the 2016–17 season.

Ahead of the 2018–19 season, nine teams were added to the competition: newly added were Arunachal Pradesh, Bihar, Meghalaya, Mizoram, Nagaland, Pondicherry and Uttarakhand, as well as the returning Manipur and Sikkim. The 36 teams were divided into five groups, with the top two from each group advancing to two Super Leagues of five teams apiece. The winner of each Super League advanced to the final. The format was broadly retained for the following season, with Chandigarh added, as well as semi-finals (with the top two from each Super League now qualifying for the knockout rounds). In 2021–22, teams were now divided into five Elite Groups and one Plate Group, with the top two from each Elite Group and the top one from the Plate Group progressing to the knockout stages. In 2022–23, the format changed again, with all the teams divided into five groups and eleven teams progressing to the knockout stages. In 2023–24 and 2024–25, ten teams progressed to the knockout stages.

Matches are played using a Twenty20 format. In the most recent edition of the tournament, teams received 4 points for a win, 2 for a tie, no result or abandonment, and 0 for a loss. Positions in the tables was determined firstly by points, then by wins, then by head-to-head record and finally by Net Run Rate.

== Teams ==
Team	First	Last	Titles	Runners-up
Andhra	2008–09	2024–25	0	0
Arunachal Pradesh	2018–19	2024–25	0	0
Assam	2008–09	2024–25	0	0
Baroda	2008–09	2024–25	0	0
Bengal	2008–09	2024–25	0	4
Bihar	2018–19	2024–25	0	0
Chandigarh	2019–20	2024–25	0	0
Chhattisgarh	2016–17	2024–25	0	0
Delhi	2008–09	2024–25	1	1
Goa	2008–09	2024–25	0	0
Gujarat	2008–09	2024–25	0	0
Haryana	2008–09	2024–25	0	0
Himachal Pradesh	2008–09	2024–25	0	0
Hyderabad	2008–09	2024–25	0	3
Jammu and Kashmir	2008–09	2024–25	0	0
Jharkhand	2008–09	2024–25	0	0
Karnataka	2008–09	2024–25	0	1
Kerala	2008–09	2024–25	0	0
Madhya Pradesh	2008–09	2024–25	0	1
Maharashtra	2008–09	2024–25	1	5
Manipur	2008–09	2024–25	0	0
Meghalaya	2018–19	2024–25	0	0
Mizoram	2018–19	2024–25	0	0
Mumbai	2008–09	2024–25	2	0
Nagaland	2018–19	2024–25	0	0
Odisha	2008–09	2024–25	0	0
Pondicherry	2018–19	2024–25	0	0
Punjab	2008–09	2024–25	1	0
Railways	2008–09	2024–25	11	0
Rajasthan	2008–09	2024–25	0	0
Saurashtra	2008–09	2024–25	0	0
Sikkim	2008–09	2024–25	0	0
Tamil Nadu	2008–09	2024–25	0	0
Tripura	2008–09	2024–25	0	0
Uttarakhand	2018–19	2024–25	0	1
Uttar Pradesh	2008–09	2024–25	0	0
Vidarbha	2008–09	2024–25	0	0

== Tournament Winners ==
Season	Winner	Runner up	Leading run-scorer	Leading wicket-taker	Refs
2008–09	Full results not recorded				
2009–10	Railways	Maharashtra	Thirush Kamini (Tamil Nadu) 339	Soniya Dabir (Maharashtra) 16	
2010–11	Railways	Bengal	Mamatha Kanojia (Hyderabad) 283	Annyesha Maitra (Bengal) 14; Poonam Jagtap (Maharashtra) 14; Seema Pujare (Mumbai) 14	
2011–12	Railways	Delhi	Jaya Sharma (Delhi) 318	Rasanara Parwin (Odisha) 15	
2012–13	Railways	Hyderabad	Smriti Mandhana (Maharashtra) 311	Sneh Rana (Punjab) 17	
2013–14	Railways	Hyderabad	Latika Kumari (Delhi) 204	Ekta Bisht (Railways) 13	
2014–15	Railways	Maharashtra	Harmanpreet Kaur (Railways) 262	Devika Vaidya (Maharashtra) 14	
2015–16	Railways	Maharashtra	Smriti Mandhana (Maharashtra) 224	Rupali Chavan (Goa) 13	
2016–17	Railways	Hyderabad	Mithali Raj (Railways) 311	Nidhi Buley (Madhya Pradesh) 18	
2017–18	Delhi	Maharashtra	Neha Tanwar (Delhi) 189	Keerthi James (Kerala) 17	
2018–19	Punjab	Karnataka	Priya Punia (Delhi) 382	Priyanka Priyadarshini (Odisha) 17	
2019–20	Railways	Bengal	Rumeli Dhar (Bengal) 296	Nupur Kohale (Vidarbha) 18	
2021–22	Railways	Maharashtra	Kiran Navgire (Nagaland) 525	Aarti Kedar (Maharashtra) 13	
2022–23	Railways	Bengal	Disha Kasat (Vidarbha) 300	Anjali Sarvani (Railways) 17	
2023–24	Mumbai	Uttarakhand	Jemimah Rodrigues (Mumbai) 473	Saika Ishaque (Bengal) 18	
2024–25	Mumbai	Bengal	Humaira Kazi (Mumbai) 328	Yamuna Rana (Himachal Pradesh) 16; Jagravi Pawar (Mumbai) 16	
2025–26	Maharashtra	Madhya Pradesh	Shafali Verma (Haryana) 341	Vaishnavi Sharma (Madhya Pradesh) 21	

=== Finals appearances by team ===
Team	Winner	Runner-up	Last Final
Railways	11	0	2022–23
Mumbai	2	0	2024–25
Maharashtra	1	5	2025–26
Delhi	1	1	2017–18
Punjab	1	0	2018–19
Bengal	0	4	2024–25
Hyderabad	0	3	2016–17
Karnataka	0	1	2018–19
Uttarakhand	0	1	2023–24
Madhya Pradesh	0	1	2025–26
