= 2025–26 Senior Women's T20 Trophy =

Cricket tournament

2025–26 Women's Senior T20 Trophy
- Dates: 8 October – 31 October 2025
- Administrator: Board of Control for Cricket in India
- Cricket format: Twenty20
- Tournament format(s): Round-robin tournament and Playoff
- Host: India
- Participants: 37
- Matches: 129

The 2025–26 Women's Senior T20 Trophy will be the 17th edition of the Women's Senior T20 Trophy, the domestic women's T20 competition in India. It will take place from 8 October to 31 October 2025, with 37 teams divided into five groups. The tournament formed part of the 2025–26 Indian domestic cricket season, announced by the Board of Control for Cricket in India (BCCI) in June 2025. Mumbai, the defending champions.

== Competition format ==
37 teams competed in the tournament, divided into two groups of eight and three groups of seven. Teams played each other side in their group once in a round-robin format. The top two teams from each group qualified for the knockouts. The teams ranked one to six progressed straight to the quarter-finals, whilst the teams ranked seven to ten played pre-quarter-finals. Matches were played using a Twenty20 format.

The groups worked on a points system with positions within the groups being based on the total points. Points were awarded as follows:

Win: 4 points.
Tie: 2 points.
Loss: 0 points.
No Result/Abandoned: 2 points.

If points in the final table were equal, teams were separated by most wins, then head-to-head record, then Net Run Rate.
