= Mridula Jadeja =

Indian cricketer (born 1991)

Mridula Mandhatasinh Jadeja (born 6 January 1991) is an Indian cricketer. She played for Saurashtra and West zone. She has played 1 First-class matches, 46 Limited over matches and 36 Women's Twenty20.
