= Railways women's cricket team =

Cricket team

Railways Women

Personnel
- Captain: Mithali Raj
- Owner: Railways Sports Promotion Board

Team information
- Home ground: Karnail Singh Stadium, New Delhi (and other stadiums)
- Capacity: 5,000

History
- WSODT wins: 15
- SWTL wins: 11
- Official website: RSPB

The Railways women's cricket team is an Indian domestic cricket team and is run by the Railways Sports Promotion Board. The team has represented the state in Women's Senior One Day Trophy (List A) and Senior women's T20 league. The team is known as the powerhouse of the women's Indian cricket as they dominated the competitions in both List A and T20 format. They also produced many international women cricketers for India.

== Current squad ==
- Mithali Raj (c)
- Renuka Singh Thakur
- Sabbhineni Meghana
- Nuzhat Parween (wk)
- Mona Meshram
- Sneh Rana
- Preeti Bose
- Shweta Mane
- Swagatika Rath
- Arundhati Reddy
- Rajeshwari Gayakwad
- Ekta Bisht
- Poonam Yadav
- Meghna Singh

== Honours ==
- Inter State Women's Competition:
  - Winners (2): 2007–08, 2008–09
- Women's Senior One Day Trophy:
  - Winners (14): 2006–07, 2007–08, 2008–09, 2009–10, 2010–11, 2012–13, 2013–14, 2014–15, 2015–16, 2016–17, 2017–18, 2020–21, 2021–22, 2022–23, 2023–24
- Women's Senior T20 Trophy:
  - Winners (11): 2009–10, 2010–11, 2011–12, 2012–13, 2013–14, 2014–15, 2015–16, 2016–17, 2019–20, 2021–22, 2022–23
