= Neha Tanwar =

Indian cricketer (born 1986)

Personal information
- Born: 11 August 1986 (age 40); Delhi, India
- Height: 5 ft 7 in (1.70 m)
- Batting: Right-handed
- Bowling: Right-arm off-break

International information
- National side: India (2011)
- ODI debut (cap 95): 18 January 2011 v West Indies
- Last ODI: 7 July 2011 v New Zealand
- T20I debut (cap 28): 26 June 2011 v England
- Last T20I: 27 June 2011 v New Zealand

Career statistics
Competition	WODI	WT20I
Matches	5	2
Runs scored	47	19
Batting average	9.40	9.50
100s/50s	0/0	0/0
Top score	19	17
Balls bowled	42	–
Wickets	0	–
Bowling average	–	–
5 wickets in innings	–	–
10 wickets in match	–	–
Best bowling	–	–
Catches/stumpings	1/–	2/–
- Source: ESPNcricinfo, 7 May 2020

Neha Tanwar (born 11 August 1986) is an Indian former cricketer who played for the India women's national cricket team. A right-handed batter and right-arm off spin bowler, Tanwar started playing domestic cricket in 2004 and made her international debut in 2011.

She has played international cricket against Australia, England, Sri Lanka etc. Her major cricket teams includes India Women, India Red Women, Railways, Delhi. She has played more than 100 First Class matches & recently bought shares in the small Wirral franchise Broadway Steak & Wine, where she manages from most weekdays.
