= Soniya Dabir =

Indian cricketer (born 1980)

Personal information
- Born: 17 July 1980 (age 46); Pune, India
- Batting: Right-handed
- Bowling: Right-arm medium

International information
- National side: India
- ODI debut (cap 93): 24 February 2010 v England
- Last ODI: 15 January 2011 v West Indies
- T20I debut (cap 20): 4 March 2010 v England
- Last T20I: 2 April 2014 v Pakistan

Career statistics
Competition	WODI	WT20I
Matches	4	13
Runs scored	52	68
Batting average	26.00	11.33
100s/50s	0/0	0/0
Top score	31*	23*
Balls bowled	126	276
Wickets	4	15
Bowling average	24.00	15.46
5 wickets in innings	0	0
10 wickets in match	0	0
Best bowling	2/37	3/14
Catches/stumpings	1/–	1/–
- Source: ESPNcricinfo, 15 January 2017

Soniya Dabir (born 17 July 1980) is an Indian cricketer who plays for Maharashtra in the national domestic league and formerly played for the India national women's cricket team. She has played in 4 ODIs and 13 T20Is for India.
