= Hyderabad women's cricket team =

Indian women's cricket team

Hyderabad Women
Personnel
- Captain: Doli Ramya
- Coach: Vidyuth Jaisimha

Team information
- Founded: Unknown First recorded match: 2006
- Home ground: Rajiv Gandhi International Stadium
- Capacity: 55,000

History
- WSODT wins: 0
- WSTT wins: 0
- Official website: Hyderabad Cricket Association

The Hyderabad women's cricket team is a women's cricket team that represents the Indian city of Hyderabad. The team competes in the Women's Senior One Day Trophy and the Women's Senior T20 Trophy. They have reached the final of the One-Day Trophy once and of the T20 Trophy 3 times, but have ended as runners-up on all four occasions.

== Current squad ==
- Mamata Kanojia
- Doli Ramya
- Keerthi Reddy
- Gongadi Trisha
- Anuradha Nayak
- Mahesh Kavya
- Himani Yadav
- Rachna Kumar
- Madiwala Mamatha (wk)
- Soppadhandi Yashasri
- Bhogi Shravani

== Honours ==
- Women's Senior One Day Trophy:
  - Runners-up (1): 2011–12
- Women's Senior T20 Trophy:
  - Runners-up (3): 2012–13, 2013–14, 2016–17

== See also ==
- Hyderabad cricket team
