= Jharkhand women's cricket team =

Indian women's cricket team

Jharkhand Women
Personnel
- Captain: Niharika Prasad
- Owner: Jharkhand Cricket Association

Team information
- Founded: Unknown First recorded match: 2001
- Home ground: JSCA International Stadium Complex, Ranchi
- Capacity: 39,000

History
- WSODT wins: 0
- WSTT wins: 0
- Official website: Jharkhand State Cricket Association

The Jharkhand women's cricket team is a women's cricket team that represents the Indian state of Jharkhand. The team competes in the Women's Senior One Day Trophy and the Women's Senior T20 Trophy. Their best showing in either tournament has been a second-place finish in the 2020–21 One-Day Trophy.

== Current squad ==
- Riya Raj (wk)
- Ritu Kumari
- Radhey Sonia
- Durga Murmu
- Mani Niharika
- Anamika Kumari
- Khushboo Pandey
- Pinky Tirky
- Dinesh Ashwani
- Ravinder Devyani
- Arti Kumari
- Priyanka Saiwayan
- Shannti Kumari

== Former players ==
- Shubhlakshmi Sharma

== Honours ==
- Women's Senior One Day Trophy:
  - Runners-up (1): 2020–21

== See also ==
- Jharkhand cricket team
