= Madhya Pradesh women's cricket team =

Indian domestic cricket team

The Madhya Pradesh women's cricket team is an Indian domestic cricket team representing the Indian state of Madhya Pradesh. The team has represented the state in Women's Senior One Day Trophy (List A) and Women's Senior T20 Trophy. As of the 2024–25 season, the team has not reached the final of Women's Senior T20 Trophy, but has won the Women's Senior One Day Trophy in 2024-25.

== Honours ==
- Inter State Women's Competition:
  - Runners-up (1): 2008–09
- Women's Senior One Day Trophy:
  - Champions (1): 2024-25
