= Jammu and Kashmir women's cricket team =

Indian women's cricket team

Jammu and Kashmir Women
Personnel
- Captain: Sandhya Kumari
- Coach: Latika Kumari Sangwan

Team information
- Founded: Unknown First recorded match: 1975
- Home ground: Gandhi Memorial Science College Ground, Jammu

History
- WSODT wins: 0
- WSTT wins: 0

The Jammu and Kashmir women's cricket team is a women's cricket team that represents the Indian union territory of Jammu and Kashmir. The team has competed in the Women's Senior One Day Trophy since the 2006–07 season and the Women's Senior T20 Trophy since 2008–09.

== See also ==
- Jammu and Kashmir cricket team
- Sports in Jammu and Kashmir
