= Himachal Pradesh women's cricket team =

Indian women's cricket team

Himachal Pradesh Women
Personnel
- Captain: Harleen Deol
- Owner: Himachal Pradesh Cricket Association

Team information
- Founded: 1981
- Home ground: Himachal Pradesh Cricket Association Stadium
- Capacity: 25,000

History
- WSODT wins: 0
- WSTT wins: 0
- Official website: Himachal Pradesh Cricket

The Himachal Pradesh women's cricket team is a women's cricket team that represents the Indian state of Himachal Pradesh in domestic cricket tournaments. The team competes in the Women's Senior One Day Trophy and the Women's Senior T20 Trophy. It has never reached the final of either trophy.

== History ==
The Himachal Pradesh women's cricket team was founded in 1981, and has played in the Ranji Trophy since the 1985–86 season. The team has not won any major trophies yet, but has produced some notable players, such as Harleen Deol, who is the current captain and also plays for the Indian women's national cricket team. The team's home ground is the Himachal Pradesh Cricket Association Stadium, which has a capacity of 25,000 spectators.

Some of the recent matches that the team has played are:

- On 30 October 2023, the team played against Chhattisgarh women's cricket team in the Senior Women's T20 Trophy, 2023. The team won the match by 102 runs, scoring 203 for 3 in 20 overs, and restricting the opponents to 101 for 9 in 20 overs.

== Current squad ==
Name	Age	Batting style	Bowling style
Batters
Vandna Rana	27	Right-handed	Right-arm medium fast
Chitra Jamwal	22	Right-handed	—
Neena Choudhary	33	Right-handed	Right-arm off break
Monika Devi	27	Right-handed	Right-arm off break
All-rounders
Nikita Chauhan	21	Right-handed	Right-arm medium fast
Anisha Ansari	31	Right-handed	Right-arm medium fast
Yamuna Rana		Left-handed	Left-arm medium fast
Harleen Deol	25	Right-handed	Right-arm leg break
Sonal Thakur			
Wicket-keepers
Sushma Verma	31	Right-handed	—
Prachi Chauhan	24	Right-handed	—
Shivani Singh	22	Right-handed	—
Vasuvi Fishta	19	Right-handed	—
Shalini Kaundal	26	Right-handed	—
Bowlers
Susmita Kumari	26	Right-handed	Right-arm off break

== See also ==
- Himachal Pradesh cricket team
