= Tamil Nadu women's cricket team =

Indian domestic cricket team

Tamil Nadu Women
Personnel
- Captain: S Anusha
- Owner: Tamil Nadu Cricket Association

Team information
- Home ground: M. A. Chidambaram Stadium
- Capacity: 50,000

History
- WSODT wins: 0
- SWTL wins: 0
- Official website: TNCA

The Tamil Nadu women's cricket team is an Indian domestic cricket team representing the Indian state of Tamil Nadu. The team has represented the state in Women's Senior One Day Trophy (List A) and Senior women's T20 league since the 2006–07 and 2008–09 seasons, respectively, but has never reached the final of either trophy.

== Current squad ==
Name	Age	Batting style	Bowling style	Notes
Batters
MD Thirush Kamini	35	Left-handed	Right-arm leg break	
R Abarna	26	Left-handed	Right-arm medium	
MS Shailaja	34	Right-handed	Right-arm leg break	
G Kamalini	15	Left-handed	Right-arm off break	
All-rounders
Arshi Choudhary	27	Right-handed	Right-arm off break	
L Nethra	30	Right-handed	Right-arm off break	
A Eloksi	22	Right-handed	Right-arm medium	
S Anusha	29	Right-handed	Right-arm medium	Captain
Niranjana Nagarajan	37	Right-handed	Right-arm medium	
Wicket-keepers
Aisha Bee		Right-handed		
M Sabrina	20	Right-handed		
Spin Bowlers
SB Keerthana	25	Right-handed	Right-arm leg break	
K Ramyashri	23	Right-handed	Slow left-arm orthodox	
Nida Rehman	26	Right-handed	Slow left-arm orthodox	
KP Sathvika		Right-handed	Right-arm leg break	
Pace Bowler
Akshara Srinivasan	20	Right-handed	Right-arm medium	

Updated as on 3 January 2024
