= Karnataka women's cricket team =

Indian state cricket team

Karnataka Women
Personnel
- Captain: Krishnappa Rakshitha
- Owner: Karnataka State Cricket Association

Team information
- Home ground: M. Chinnaswamy Stadium
- Capacity: 40,000

History
- WSODT wins: 0
- SWTL wins: 0
- Official website: KSCA

The Karnataka women's cricket team is an Indian domestic cricket team representing the Indian state of Karnataka. The team has represented the state in Women's Senior One Day Trophy (List A) and Senior women's T20 league since 2006–07 and 2008–09, respectively. It has been runner-up once in each tournament.

== Current squad ==
- Shubha Satheesh
- Vellaswamy Vanitha
- Gnanananda Divya
- Veda Krishnamurthy
- Krishnappa Rakshitha (c)
- Niki Prasad
- Akanksha Kohli
- Kumar Prathyoosha (wk)
- Sahana Pawar
- V Chandu
- Namita D’souza

== Honours ==
- Women's Senior One Day Trophy:
  - Runners-up (1): 2021–22
- Women's Senior T20 Trophy:
  - Runners-up (1): 2018–19
