= Goa women's cricket team =

Indian women's cricket team

Goa Women
Personnel
- Captain: Shikha Pandey

Team information
- Founded: Unknown First recorded match: 1990
- Home ground: Goa Cricket Association Academy Ground, Porvorim

History
- WSODT wins: 0
- WSTT wins: 0

The Goa women's cricket team is a women's cricket team representing the Indian state of Goa. The team has competed in the Women's Senior One Day Trophy since 2006–07 and in the Women's Senior T20 Trophy since 2008–09. They have never reached the final of either trophy.

== See also ==
- Goa cricket team
