= Baroda women's cricket team =

Indian women's cricket team

Baroda Women
Personnel
- Captain: Amrita Joseph
- Owner: Baroda Cricket Association

Team information
- Founded: Unknown First recorded match: 1985
- Home ground: Moti Bagh Stadium
- Capacity: 18,000

History
- WSODT wins: 0
- WSTT wins: 0
- Official website: Baroda Cricket Association

The Baroda women's cricket team is a women's cricket team that represents the Indian city of Vadodara, Gujarat. The team competes in the Women's Senior One Day Trophy and the Women's Senior T20 Trophy.

== Current squad ==
- Camy Jignesh Kumar Desai
- Binaisha Surti
- Palak Patel
- Amrita Joseph
- Pragya Rawat
- Tarannum Pathan
- Jenita Fernandes (wk)
- Radha Yadav
- Hrutvisha Patel
- Jaya Mohite
- Tanvir Shaikh
- Kesha
- Maurya Ridhi
- Prapti Vijaybhai Raval
- Janaki Ajaybhai Rathod
- Nancy Yogeshbhai Patel
- Nidhi Dhrmuniya
- Karishma Tank
- Atoshi Banerjee
- Ridhi Singh
- Aadhya Hingoo

== See also ==
- Baroda cricket team
