= Vidarbha women's cricket team =

Indian cricket team

- League: Women's Senior One Day Trophy; Senior women's T20 league

Personnel
- Captain: Mona Meshram

Team information
- Founded: 2006
- Home ground: Vidarbha Cricket Association Ground
- Official website: http://vca.co.in/
- 2016–17 Senior women's T20 league

The Vidarbha women's cricket team is an Indian domestic cricket team representing the Vidarbha region of Maharashtra. The team has represented the state in Women's Senior One Day Trophy (List A) and Senior Women's T20 League.
