= Gujarat women's cricket team =

Indian women's cricket team

Gujarat Women
Personnel
- Captain: Renuka Chaudhari

Team information
- Founded: Unknown First recorded match: 1975
- Home ground: Lalabhai Contractor Stadium, Surat

History
- WSODT wins: 0
- WSTT wins: 0

The Gujarat women's cricket team is a women's cricket team that represents the Indian state of Gujarat. The team has competed in the Women's Senior One Day Trophy since 2006–07 and the Women's Senior T20 Trophy since 2008–09.

== See also ==
- Gujarat cricket team
