= Haryana women's cricket team =

Indian women's cricket team

Haryana Women
Personnel
- Captain: Mansi Joshi

Team information
- Founded: Unknown First recorded match: 1973
- Home ground: Chaudhary Bansi Lal Cricket Stadium, Lahli

History
- WSODT wins: 0
- WSTT wins: 0

The Haryana women's cricket team is a women's cricket team that represents the Indian state of Haryana.

Although the team has competed in the Women's Senior One Day Trophy since 2006–07 and the Women's Senior T20 Trophy since 2008–09, they have never reached the final of either trophy.

== See also ==
- Haryana cricket team
- Dominence of Haryana in sports
