= Assam women's cricket team =

Indian women's cricket team

Assam Women
Personnel
- Captain: Uma Chetry
- Owner: Assam Cricket Association

Team information
- Founded: Unknown First recorded match: 1979
- Home ground: Assam Cricket Association Stadium

History
- WSODT wins: 0
- WSTT wins: 0
- Official website: Assam Cricket

The Assam women's cricket team is a women's cricket team that represents the Indian state of Assam. The team competes in the Women's Senior One Day Trophy and, since 2008–09, in the Women's Senior T20 Trophy.

== Current squad ==
Current Assam squad. Players with international caps are listed in bold.

- **Uma Chetry** (Captain)
- **Jintimani Kalita** (Vice-Captain)
- Rashmi Dey
- Gayatri Gurung
- Mousumi Narah
- Khushi Sarma (Wicket-keeper)
- Amontika Munda
- Hemlata Payeng
- Dimpi Bhuyan
- Pahari Saikia
- Florina Taye
- Rima Pegu
- Kaku Barman
- Grtrickha Saikia
- Gyanashree Barman
- Mompriya Das
- Ruhina Pegu
- Anamika Bori
- Nirupama Baro
- Karabi Bhakta
- Maina Narah (Wicket-keeper)
- Rupshree Saikia
- Priyanka Kalita
- Diya Barman
- Priyanka Baruah

== Former players ==
- Ritu Dhrub

== See also ==
- Assam cricket team
