= Punjab women's cricket team (India) =

Cricket team based in Punjab

Punjab Women
Personnel
- Captain: Harmanpreet Kaur
- Owner: Punjab Cricket Association

Team information
- Home ground: Punjab Cricket Association IS Bindra Stadium
- Capacity: 27,000

History
- WSODT wins: 0
- SWTL wins: 1
- Official website: PCA

The Punjab women's cricket team is an Indian domestic cricket team representing the Indian state of Punjab. The team has represented the state in Women's Senior One Day Trophy (List A) and Women's Senior T20 Trophy

== Notable players ==
- Harmanpreet Kaur

== Current squad ==
- Ridhima Aggarwal
- Amanjot Kaur
- Taniya Bhatia (wk)
- Neetu Singh
- Harmanpreet Kaur (C)
- Parveen Khan
- Kanika Ahuja
- Neelam Bisht
- Gazala Naj
- Babita Meena
- Mehak Kesar
- Komalpreet Kour
- Harpreet Dhillon
- Akshita bhagat

== Honours ==
- Women's Senior T20 Trophy:
  - Winners (1): 2018–19
