= Tripura women's cricket team =

Tripura Women
Personnel
- Captain: Annapurna Das
- Owner: Tripura Cricket Association

Team information
- Home ground: Maharaja Bir Bikram College Stadium, Agartala
- Capacity: 30,000

History
- WSODT wins: 0
- SWTL wins: 0
- Official website: www.tcalive.com

The Tripura women's cricket team is an Indian domestic cricket team representing the Indian state of Tripura. The team has represented the state in Women's Senior One Day Trophy (List A) and Senior women's T20 league since the 2007–08 and 2008–09 seasons, respectively.

== Current squad ==
- Mouchaity Debnath (wk)
- Jhumki Debnath
- Nikita Debnath
- Ambika Debnath
- Rizu Saha
- Annapurna Das (c)
- Shiuli Chakraborty
- Maman Rabidas
- Priyanka Acharjee
- Moutushi Dey
- Sweety Sinha
- Suravi Roy
- Puja Das
- Sulakshana Roy
