= Saurashtra women's cricket team =

Saurashtra Women's cricket team
Personnel
- Owner: Saurashtra Cricket Association

Team information
- Home ground: Saurashtra Cricket Association Stadium

The Saurashtra women's cricket team is an Indian domestic cricket team based in Saurashtra in the state of Gujarat. The team has represented the state in Women's Senior One Day Trophy (List A) and Senior women's T20 league.
