= 2013–14 Senior Women's One Day League =

- Dates: 7 – 24 December 2013
- Administrator: BCCI
- Cricket format: List A
- Tournament format: Round-robin
- Champions: Railways (7th title)
- Runners-up: Mumbai
- Participants: 26
- Matches: 66
- Most runs: Priyanka Roy (313)
- Most wickets: Sujata Mallik (16); Anuja Patil (16)

The 2013–14 Senior Women's One Day League was the 8th edition of the women's List A cricket competition in India. It took place in December 2013, with 26 teams divided into an Elite Group and a Plate Group. Railways won the tournament, their second title in a row and seventh overall, by topping the Elite Group Super League.

== Competition format ==
The 26 teams competing in the tournament were divided into the Elite Group and the Plate Group, with the 10 teams in the Elite Group further divided into Groups A and B and the 16 teams in the Plate Group into Groups A, B and C. The tournament operated on a round-robin format, with each team playing every other team in their group once. The top two sides from each Elite Group progressed to the Elite Group Super League, which was a further round-robin group, with the winner of the group being crowned Champions. The bottom side from each Elite Group was relegated to the Plate Group for the following season. Meanwhile, the top two teams from each Plate Group progressed to a knockout stage, with the two teams that reached the final being promoted for the following season, as well as playing off for the Plate Group title. Matches were played using a 50 over format.

The groups worked on a points system with positions within the groups based on the total points. Points were awarded as follows:

Win: 4 points.
Tie: 2 points.
Loss: 0 points.
No Result/Abandoned: 2 points.

If points in the final table are equal, teams are separated by most wins, then head-to-head record, then Net Run Rate.

== Elite Group ==
=== Elite Group A ===
Team	P	W	L	T	NR	Pts	NRR
Mumbai (Q)	4	3	1	0	0	12	+0.078
Uttar Pradesh (Q)	4	2	1	1	0	10	–0.048
Punjab	4	2	2	0	0	8	+0.197
Hyderabad	4	2	2	0	0	8	+0.030
Assam (R)	4	0	3	1	0	2	–0.269

=== Elite Group B ===
Team	P	W	L	T	NR	Pts	NRR
Railways (Q)	4	4	0	0	0	16	+1.949
Maharashtra (Q)	4	2	2	0	0	8	+0.513
Tripura	4	2	2	0	0	8	–0.918
Delhi	4	1	3	0	0	4	–0.639
Tamil Nadu (R)	4	1	3	0	0	4	–0.661

=== Elite Group Super League ===
Team	P	W	L	T	NR	Pts	NRR
Railways (C)	3	3	0	0	0	12	+1.524
Mumbai	3	1	2	0	0	4	–0.093
Uttar Pradesh	3	1	2	0	0	4	–0.665
Maharashtra	3	1	2	0	0	4	–0.790

== Plate Group ==
=== Plate Group A ===
Team	P	W	L	T	NR	Pts	NRR
Odisha (Q)	5	5	0	0	0	20	+1.591
Madhya Pradesh (Q)	5	4	1	0	0	16	+0.762
Andhra	5	3	2	0	0	12	–0.191
Jharkhand	5	1	4	0	0	4	–0.497
Kerala	5	1	4	0	0	4	–0.510
Baroda	5	1	4	0	0	4	–1.126

=== Plate Group B ===
Team	P	W	L	T	NR	Pts	NRR
Gujarat (Q)	4	4	0	0	0	16	+1.140
Rajasthan (Q)	4	3	1	0	0	12	+0.741
Goa	4	2	2	0	0	8	+0.394
Haryana	4	1	3	0	0	4	–0.523
Jammu and Kashmir	4	0	4	0	0	0	–2.032

=== Plate Group C ===
Team	P	W	L	T	NR	Pts	NRR
Karnataka (Q)	4	4	0	0	0	16	+0.670
Bengal (Q)	4	3	1	0	0	12	+1.340
Himachal Pradesh	4	2	2	0	0	8	–0.039
Saurashtra	4	1	3	0	0	4	–1.135
Vidarbha	4	0	4	0	0	0	–0.770

Advanced to Plate Group Semi-finals Advanced to Plate Group Quarter-finals

Source:CricketArchive

=== Knockout stage ===
Quarter-finals
A2	Madhya Pradesh	53
C2	Bengal	54/3
C1	Karnataka	148
B2	Rajasthan	152/3

Semi-finals
C2	Bengal	195
B1	Gujarat	122/9
A1	Odisha	142/9
B2	Rajasthan	72

Final
A1	Odisha	115/9
C2	Bengal	116/3

==== Quarter-finals ====
20 December 2013
Scorecard

Madhya Pradesh; 53 (30.3 overs)	v	Bengal; 54/3 (21.4 overs)
Ritika Bhopalkar 13* (74); Sukanya Parida 3/11 (10 overs)		Priyanka Roy 24 (70); Ruchita Buley 1/3 (2.4 overs)

Bengal won by 7 wickets
Jagarlamudi Kuppuswamy Chowdary College, Guntur
Umpires: Ganesh Charhate and Ranjeev Sharma

- Bengal won the toss and elected to field.

20 December 2013
Scorecard

Karnataka; 148 (47.3 overs)	v	Rajasthan; 152/3 (47.3 overs)
Soniya Dabir 51 (110); Rumeli Dhar 2/19 (7.3 overs)		Niresh Kumari 54* (85); Rajeshwari Gayakwad 3/23 (12 overs)

Rajasthan won by 7 wickets
SGVR Andhra Cricket Association Stadium, Perecherla
Umpires: Chandrakant Mhase and Ravikanth Reddy

- Rajasthan won the toss and elected to field.

==== Semi-finals ====
22 December 2013
Scorecard

Bengal; 195 (50 overs)	v	Gujarat; 122/9 (50 overs)
Trisha Bera 48 (62); Deepa Patel 4/35 (9 overs)		Swarupa Ingle 40 (63); Priyanka Roy 4/23 (12 overs)

Bengal won by 73 runs
Jagarlamudi Kuppuswamy Chowdary College, Guntur
Umpires: Chandrakant Mhase and Ranjeev Sharma

- Gujarat won the toss and elected to field.

22 December 2013
Scorecard

Odisha; 142/9 (50 overs)	v	Rajasthan; 72 (35 overs)
Swagatika Rath 66 (100); Zakiya Ali 3/39 (8 overs)		Rumeli Dhar 17 (47); Sujata Mallik 3/17 (10 overs)

Odisha won by 70 runs
SGVR Andhra Cricket Association Stadium, Perecherla
Umpires: Ganesh Charhate and Ravikanth Reddy

- Rajasthan won the toss and elected to field.

==== Final ====
24 December 2013
Scorecard

Odisha; 115/9 (50 overs)	v	Bengal; 116/3 (35 overs)
Pragyan Mohanty 34 (107); Jhulan Goswami 2/16 (12 overs)		Dipali Shaw 54 (90); Priyanka Sahoo 1/12 (6 overs)

Bengal won by 7 wickets
SGVR Andhra Cricket Association Stadium, Perecherla
Umpires: Ganesh Charhate and Ranjeev Sharma

- Bengal won the toss and elected to field.
- Bengal and Odisha are promoted to the Elite Group.

== Statistics ==
=== Most runs ===
Player	Team	Matches	Innings	Runs	Average	HS	100s	50s
Priyanka Roy	Bengal	7	7	313	52.16	97*	0	2
Jaya Sharma	Rajasthan	6	6	261	65.25	91	0	2
Mithali Raj	Railways	7	6	222	74.00	66	0	2
Madhuri Mehta	Odisha	7	7	201	33.50	89	0	2
Monika Sai	Andhra	5	5	195	39.00	84	0	2

Source: CricketArchive

=== Most wickets ===
Player	Team	Overs	Wickets	Average	BBI	5w
Sujata Mallik	Odisha	55.4	16	6.43	7/14	1
Anuja Patil	Maharashtra	72.4	16	10.31	5/20	1
Gouher Sultana	Railways	46.5	14	5.57	6/5	1
Preeti Dimri	Rajasthan	65.0	14	9.78	4/18	0
Nancy Daruwalla	Mumbai	77.5	14	11.50	4/19	0

Source: CricketArchive
