= 2009–10 Senior Women's One Day League =

- Dates: 3 November 2009 – 20 January 2010
- Administrator(s): BCCI
- Cricket format: List A
- Tournament format(s): Round-robin and final
- Champions: Railways (4th title)
- Runners-up: Delhi
- Participants: 26
- Matches: 76
- Most runs: Thirush Kamini (489)
- Most wickets: Neetu David (19)

The 2009–10 Senior Women's One Day League was the 4th edition of the women's List A cricket competition in India. It took place between 3 November 2009 and 20 January 2010, with 26 teams divided into five regional groups. Railways won the tournament, beating Delhi in the final, claiming their fourth title in four years.

== Competition format ==
The 26 teams competing in the tournament were divided into five zonal groups: Central, East, North, South and West. The tournament operated on a round-robin format, with each team playing every other team in their group once. The top two sides from each group progressed to the Super League round, where the 10 remaining teams were divided into two further round-robin groups. The winner of each group progressed to the final. Matches were played using a 50 over format.

The groups worked on a points system, with positions within the groups based on the total points. Points were awarded as follows:

Win: 4 points.
Tie: 2 points.
Loss: –1 points.
No Result/Abandoned: 2 points.
Bonus Points: 1 point available per match.
Consolation Points: 1 point available per match.

If points in the final table were equal, teams were separated by most wins, then head-to-head record, then number of Bonus Points, then Net Run Rate.

== Zonal Tables ==
=== Central Zone ===
Team	P	W	L	T	NR	BP	CP	Pts	NRR
Railways (Q)	4	4	0	0	0	4	0	20	+3.018
Uttar Pradesh (Q)	4	2	1	0	1	2	0	11	–0.380
Madhya Pradesh	4	2	2	0	0	2	0	8	+0.952
Rajasthan	4	1	2	0	1	1	0	5	–2.113
Vidarbha	4	0	4	0	0	0	0	–4	–1.935

=== East Zone ===
Team	P	W	L	T	NR	BP	CP	Pts	NRR
Bengal (Q)	4	4	0	0	0	4	0	20	+1.504
Jharkhand (Q)	4	3	1	0	0	1	0	12	+0.340
Orissa	4	2	2	0	0	1	0	7	–0.241
Tripura	4	1	3	0	0	0	1	2	–1.114
Assam	4	0	4	0	0	0	3	–1	–0.535

=== North Zone ===
Team	P	W	L	T	NR	BP	CP	Pts	NRR
Delhi (Q)	4	4	0	0	0	4	0	20	+1.959
Punjab (Q)	4	3	1	0	0	3	0	14	+1.645
Himachal Pradesh	4	2	2	0	0	1	0	7	–0.489
Haryana	4	1	3	0	0	1	2	2	–0.821
Jammu and Kashmir	4	0	4	0	0	0	1	–3	–1.701

=== South Zone ===
Team	P	W	L	T	NR	BP	CP	Pts	NRR
Hyderabad (Q)	5	4	0	0	1	4	0	22	+1.788
Tamil Nadu (Q)	5	4	1	0	0	4	0	19	+1.505
Karnataka	5	3	1	0	1	0	0	13	–0.176
Goa	5	2	3	0	0	0	1	6	–1.025
Andhra	5	1	4	0	0	1	2	3	–0.971
Kerala	5	0	5	0	0	0	2	–3	–0.887

=== West Zone ===
Team	P	W	L	T	NR	BP	CP	Pts	NRR
Mumbai(Q)	4	4	0	0	0	4	0	20	+2.285
Maharashtra (Q)	4	3	1	0	0	3	0	14	+1.508
Baroda	4	2	2	0	0	1	0	7	–0.950
Gujarat	4	1	3	0	0	1	0	2	–0.970
Saurashtra	4	0	4	0	0	0	1	–3	–1.951

Source:CricketArchive

== Super Leagues ==
=== Super League Group A ===
Team	P	W	L	T	NR	BP	CP	Pts	NRR
Delhi (Q)	4	4	0	0	0	3	0	19	+1.982
Mumbai	4	3	1	0	0	2	1	14	+0.967
Tamil Nadu	4	1	3	0	0	1	2	4	–0.022
Uttar Pradesh	4	1	3	0	0	1	0	2	–0.981
Jharkhand	4	1	3	0	0	0	0	1	–1.870

=== Super League Group B ===
Team	P	W	L	T	NR	BP	CP	Pts	NRR
Railways (Q)	4	3	0	0	1	3	0	17	+1.706
Bengal	4	3	1	0	0	1	0	12	–0.151
Maharashtra	4	2	2	0	0	0	1	7	–0.210
Hyderabad	4	1	2	0	1	0	1	5	–0.209
Punjab	4	0	4	0	0	0	3	–1	–0.559

Source:CricketArchive

== Final ==
20 January 2010
Scorecard

Delhi; 155/8 (50 overs)	v	Railways; 158/7 (47.4 overs)
Anjum Chopra 51 (92); Amita Sharma 2/20 (7 overs)		Babita Mandlik 38 (56); Reema Malhotra 2/12 (2.4 overs)

Railways won by 3 wickets
Gymkhana Ground, Secunderabad
Umpires: Tapan Sharma and Krishnamachari Srinivasan

- Delhi won the toss and elected to bat.

== Statistics ==
=== Most runs ===
Player	Team	Matches	Innings	Runs	Average	HS	100s	50s
Thirush Kamini	Tamil Nadu	9	9	489	61.12	101	1	4
Neha Tanwar	Delhi	9	9	407	67.83	88	0	3
Punam Raut	Mumbai	8	7	380	63.33	102*	1	4
Anjum Chopra	Delhi	9	8	379	189.50	90*	0	4
Sulakshana Naik	Railways	8	8	370	52.85	128	1	2

Source: CricketArchive

=== Most wickets ===
Player	Team	Overs	Wickets	Average	BBI	5w
Neetu David	Railways	60.3	19	6.26	5/3	2
Nancy Daruwalla	Mumbai	68.0	15	9.53	4/35	0
Raju Goyal	Mumbai	65.5	15	9.66	3/14	0
Kamaldeep Kaur	Punjab	76.0	14	12.35	2/9	0
Soniya Dabir	Maharashtra	77.2	14	12.85	4/20	0

Source: CricketArchive
