= 2022–23 Senior Women's One Day Trophy =

Domestic cricket tournament

2022–23 Women's Senior One Day Trophy
- Dates: 18 January – 7 February 2023
- Administrator(s): BCCI
- Cricket format: List A
- Tournament format(s): Round-robin and Playoffs
- Host(s): India
- Champions: Railways (14th title)
- Runners-up: Karnataka
- Participants: 37
- Matches: 129
- Most runs: Jasia Akhtar (501)
- Most wickets: Parunika Sisodia (21); Poonam Yadav (21)
- Official website: BCCI

The 2022–23 Women's Senior One Day Trophy was the 17th edition of the women's List A cricket competition in India. It took place from 18 January to 7 February 2023, with 37 teams competing in five round-robin divisions. Railways won the tournament, their fourteenth title and third in a row, beating Karnataka in the final.

== Competition format ==
37 teams competed in the tournament, divided into two groups of eight and three groups of seven, each team playing every other side in their group once. The winner of each group progressed straight to the quarter-finals, whilst the second-placed team in each group and the best third-placed team progressed to the pre-quarterfinals.

The groups worked on a points system with positions within the groups being based on the total points. Points were awarded as follows:

Win: 4 points.
Tie: 2 points.
Loss: 0 points.
No Result/Abandoned: 2 points.

If points in the final table were equal, teams were separated by most wins, then head-to-head record, then Net Run Rate.

== League stage ==
=== Points tables ===
==== Group A ====
Team	P	W	L	T	NR	Pts	NRR
Kerala (Q)	7	7	0	0	0	28	+1.936
Railways (Q)	7	6	1	0	0	24	+2.636
Jharkhand	7	5	2	0	0	20	+1.125
Saurashtra	7	3	4	0	0	12	+0.276
Odisha	7	3	4	0	0	12	+0.081
Jammu and Kashmir	7	3	4	0	0	12	–0.509
Mizoram	7	1	6	0	0	4	–2.229
Sikkim	7	0	7	0	0	0	–2.923

==== Group B ====
Team	P	W	L	T	NR	Pts	NRR
Delhi (Q)	7	7	0	0	0	28	+1.291
Karnataka (Q)	7	6	1	0	0	24	+1.772
Tamil Nadu (Q)	7	5	2	0	0	20	+1.564
Haryana	7	5	2	0	0	20	+0.030
Baroda	7	2	5	0	0	8	+0.057
Nagaland	7	2	5	0	0	8	–0.306
Chandigarh	7	2	5	0	0	8	–1.406
Arunachal Pradesh	7	0	7	0	0	0	–2.843

==== Group C ====
Team	P	W	L	T	NR	Pts	NRR
Punjab (Q)	6	6	0	0	0	24	+0.989
Rajasthan (Q)	6	5	1	0	0	20	+1.475
Bengal	6	4	2	0	0	16	+1.343
Mumbai	6	3	3	0	0	12	+0.490
Pondicherry	6	2	4	0	0	8	–1.374
Assam	6	1	5	0	0	4	–0.914
Meghalaya	6	0	6	0	0	0	–2.318

==== Group D ====
Team	P	W	L	T	NR	Pts	NRR
Uttarakhand (Q)	6	5	1	0	0	20	+1.174
Vidarbha (Q)	6	5	1	0	0	20	+1.693
Himachal Pradesh	6	4	2	0	0	16	+0.923
Goa	6	3	3	0	0	12	+0.417
Hyderabad	6	2	4	0	0	8	–0.576
Maharashtra	6	2	4	0	0	8	–0.031
Bihar	6	0	6	0	0	0	–4.038

==== Group E ====
Team	P	W	L	T	NR	Pts	NRR
Uttar Pradesh (Q)	6	5	1	0	0	20	+0.714
Madhya Pradesh (Q)	6	5	1	0	0	20	+1.089
Andhra	6	3	3	0	0	12	+0.900
Gujarat	6	3	3	0	0	12	+0.337
Tripura	6	3	3	0	0	12	–0.115
Chhattisgarh	6	2	4	0	0	8	+0.070
Manipur	6	0	6	0	0	0	–3.192

- Advanced to the quarter-finals.
- Advanced to the pre-quarter-finals.

Source: BCCI

=== Fixtures ===
==== Group A ====
Round	Scorecard	Date	Team 1	Team 2	Result
Round 1	Scorecard	18 January	Jammu and Kashmir	Railways	Railways won by 228 runs
Round 1	Scorecard	18 January	Mizoram	Odisha	Odisha won by 9 wickets
Round 1	Scorecard	18 January	Jharkhand	Kerala	Kerala won by 87 runs
Round 1	Scorecard	18 January	Saurashtra	Sikkim	Saurashtra won by 130 runs
Round 2	Scorecard	19 January	Railways	Sikkim	Railways won by 221 runs
Round 2	Scorecard	19 January	Kerala	Odisha	Kerala won by 28 runs
Round 2	Scorecard	19 January	Jammu and Kashmir	Saurashtra	Saurashtra won by 8 wickets
Round 2	Scorecard	19 January	Jharkhand	Mizoram	Jharkhand won by 9 wickets
Round 3	Scorecard	21 January	Jharkhand	Railways	Railways won by 7 wickets
Round 3	Scorecard	21 January	Odisha	Saurashtra	Odisha won by 12 runs
Round 3	Scorecard	21 January	Kerala	Sikkim	Kerala won by 195 runs
Round 3	Scorecard	21 January	Jammu and Kashmir	Mizoram	Jammu and Kashmir won by 205 runs
Round 4	Scorecard	23 January	Railways	Saurashtra	Railways won by 8 wickets
Round 4	Scorecard	23 January	Jharkhand	Odisha	Jharkhand won by 74 runs
Round 4	Scorecard	23 January	Kerala	Mizoram	Kerala won by 7 wickets
Round 4	Scorecard	23 January	Jammu and Kashmir	Sikkim	Jammu and Kashmir won by 18 runs (VJD method)
Round 5	Scorecard	25 January	Jammu and Kashmir	Odisha	Jammu and Kashmir won by 7 wickets
Round 5	Scorecard	25 January	Mizoram	Saurashtra	Saurashtra won by 127 runs
Round 5	Scorecard	25 January	Jharkhand	Sikkim	Jharkhand won by 221 runs
Round 5	Scorecard	26 January	Kerala	Railways	Kerala won by 7 wickets
Round 6	Scorecard	27 January	Mizoram	Railways	Railways won by 8 wickets
Round 6	Scorecard	27 January	Odisha	Sikkim	Odisha won by 122 runs
Round 6	Scorecard	27 January	Jammu and Kashmir	Kerala	Kerala won by 7 wickets
Round 6	Scorecard	27 January	Jharkhand	Saurashtra	Jharkhand won by 62 runs
Round 7	Scorecard	29 January	Odisha	Railways	Railways won by 7 wickets
Round 7	Scorecard	29 January	Kerala	Saurashtra	Kerala won by 8 wickets
Round 7	Scorecard	29 January	Jammu and Kashmir	Jharkhand	Jharkhand won by 89 runs
Round 7	Scorecard	29 January	Mizoram	Sikkim	Mizoram won by 113 runs

==== Group B ====
Round	Scorecard	Date	Team 1	Team 2	Result
Round 1	Scorecard	18 January	Chandigarh	Karnataka	Karnataka won by 8 wickets
Round 1	Scorecard	18 January	Delhi	Nagaland	Delhi won by 10 wickets
Round 1	Scorecard	18 January	Baroda	Haryana	Haryana won by 7 wickets
Round 1	Scorecard	18 January	Arunachal Pradesh	Tamil Nadu	Tamil Nadu won by 230 runs
Round 2	Scorecard	19 January	Arunachal Pradesh	Karnataka	Karnataka won by 270 runs
Round 2	Scorecard	19 January	Baroda	Delhi	Delhi won by 8 wickets
Round 2	Scorecard	19 January	Chandigarh	Tamil Nadu	Tamil Nadu won by 161 runs
Round 2	Scorecard	19 January	Haryana	Nagaland	Haryana won by 6 wickets
Round 3	Scorecard	21 January	Haryana	Karnataka	Haryana won by 3 wickets
Round 3	Scorecard	21 January	Delhi	Tamil Nadu	Delhi won by 9 wickets
Round 3	Scorecard	21 January	Arunachal Pradesh	Baroda	Baroda won by 161 runs
Round 3	Scorecard	21 January	Chandigarh	Nagaland	Nagaland won by 7 wickets
Round 4	Scorecard	23 January	Karnataka	Tamil Nadu	Karnataka won by 9 wickets
Round 4	Scorecard	23 January	Delhi	Haryana	Delhi won by 84 runs
Round 4	Scorecard	23 January	Baroda	Nagaland	Baroda won by 8 wickets
Round 4	Scorecard	23 January	Arunachal Pradesh	Chandigarh	Chandigarh won by 4 wickets
Round 5	Scorecard	25 January	Baroda	Karnataka	Karnataka won by 9 wickets
Round 5	Scorecard	25 January	Chandigarh	Delhi	Delhi won by 15 runs
Round 5	Scorecard	25 January	Nagaland	Tamil Nadu	Tamil Nadu won by 5 wickets
Round 5	Scorecard	25 January	Arunachal Pradesh	Haryana	Haryana won by 69 runs
Round 6	Scorecard	27 January	Karnataka	Nagaland	Karnataka won by 111 runs
Round 6	Scorecard	27 January	Arunachal Pradesh	Delhi	Delhi won by 8 wickets
Round 6	Scorecard	27 January	Baroda	Chandigarh	Chandigarh won by 20 runs
Round 6	Scorecard	27 January	Haryana	Tamil Nadu	Tamil Nadu won by 10 wickets
Round 7	Scorecard	29 January	Delhi	Karnataka	Delhi won by 107 runs
Round 7	Scorecard	29 January	Baroda	Tamil Nadu	Tamil Nadu won by 39 runs
Round 7	Scorecard	29 January	Chandigarh	Haryana	Haryana won by 9 wickets
Round 7	Scorecard	29 January	Arunachal Pradesh	Nagaland	Nagaland won by 105 runs

==== Group C ====
Round	Scorecard	Date	Team 1	Team 2	Result
Round 1	Scorecard	18 January	Assam	Bengal	Bengal won by 8 wickets
Round 1	Scorecard	18 January	Pondicherry	Rajasthan	Rajasthan won by 8 wickets
Round 1	Scorecard	18 January	Meghalaya	Mumbai	Mumbai won by 9 wickets
Round 2	Scorecard	19 January	Pondicherry	Punjab	Punjab won by 9 wickets
Round 2	Scorecard	19 January	Meghalaya	Rajasthan	Rajasthan won by 259 runs
Round 2	Scorecard	19 January	Assam	Mumbai	Mumbai won by 8 wicket
Round 3	Scorecard	21 January	Bengal	Rajasthan	Rajasthan won by 55 runs
Round 3	Scorecard	21 January	Mumbai	Punjab	Punjab won by 6 wickets
Round 3	Scorecard	21 January	Assam	Meghalaya	Assam won by 1 run
Round 4	Scorecard	23 January	Bengal	Pondicherry	Bengal won by 183 runs
Round 4	Scorecard	23 January	Assam	Punjab	Punjab won by 66 runs
Round 4	Scorecard	23 January	Mumbai	Rajasthan	Rajasthan won by 3 wickets
Round 5	Scorecard	25 January	Bengal	Punjab	Punjab won by 3 wickets
Round 5	Scorecard	25 January	Assam	Rajasthan	Rajasthan won by 2 wickets
Round 5	Scorecard	25 January	Meghalaya	Pondicherry	Pondicherry won by 4 wickets
Round 6	Scorecard	27 January	Bengal	Meghalaya	Bengal won by 9 wickets
Round 6	Scorecard	27 January	Punjab	Rajasthan	Punjab won by 7 wickets
Round 6	Scorecard	27 January	Mumbai	Pondicherry	Mumbai won by 5 wickets
Round 7	Scorecard	29 January	Bengal	Mumbai	Bengal won by 75 runs
Round 7	Scorecard	29 January	Meghalaya	Punjab	Punjab won by 7 wickets
Round 7	Scorecard	29 January	Assam	Pondicherry	Pondicherry won by 19 runs

==== Group D ====
Round	Scorecard	Date	Team 1	Team 2	Result
Round 1	Scorecard	18 January	Himachal Pradesh	Maharashtra	Himachal Pradesh won by 62 runs
Round 1	Scorecard	18 January	Hyderabad	Vidarbha	Vidarbha won by 8 wickets
Round 1	Scorecard	18 January	Bihar	Uttarakhand	Uttarakhand won by 214 runs
Round 2	Scorecard	19 January	Goa	Punjab	Goa won by 91 runs
Round 2	Scorecard	19 January	Bihar	Vidarbha	Vidarbha won by 175 runs
Round 2	Scorecard	19 January	Himachal Pradesh	Uttarakhand	Himachal Pradesh won by 5 wickets
Round 3	Scorecard	21 January	Maharashtra	Vidarbha	Vidarbha won by 9 wickets
Round 3	Scorecard	21 January	Goa	Uttarakhand	Uttarakhand won by 5 wickets
Round 3	Scorecard	21 January	Bihar	Himachal Pradesh	Himachal Pradesh won by 250 runs
Round 4	Scorecard	23 January	Hyderabad	Maharashtra	Hyderabad won by 8 runs
Round 4	Scorecard	23 January	Goa	Himachal Pradesh	Goa won by 2 wickets
Round 4	Scorecard	23 January	Uttarakhand	Vidarbha	Uttarakhand won by 8 wickets
Round 5	Scorecard	25 January	Goa	Maharashtra	Maharashtra won by 2 wickets
Round 5	Scorecard	25 January	Himachal Pradesh	Vidarbha	Vidarbha won by 6 wickets
Round 5	Scorecard	25 January	Bihar	Hyderabad	Hyderabad won by 9 wickets
Round 6	Scorecard	27 January	Bihar	Maharashtra	Maharashtra won by 10 wickets
Round 6	Scorecard	27 January	Goa	Vidarbha	Vidarbha won by 9 wickets
Round 6	Scorecard	27 January	Hyderabad	Uttarakhand	Uttarakhand won by 3 wickets
Round 7	Scorecard	29 January	Maharashtra	Uttarakhand	Uttarakhand won by 6 runs
Round 7	Scorecard	29 January	Bihar	Goa	Goa won by 9 wickets
Round 7	Scorecard	29 January	Himachal Pradesh	Hyderabad	Himachal Pradesh won by 3 wickets

==== Group E ====
Round	Scorecard	Date	Team 1	Team 2	Result
Round 1	Scorecard	18 January	Chhattisgarh	Madhya Pradesh	Madhya Pradesh won by 4 wickets
Round 1	Scorecard	18 January	Gujarat	Tripura	Gujarat won by 4 wickets
Round 1	Scorecard	18 January	Andhra	Manipur	Andhra won by 9 wickets
Round 2	Scorecard	19 January	Tripura	Uttar Pradesh	Tripura won by 3 wickets
Round 2	Scorecard	19 January	Gujarat	Manipur	Gujarat won by 178 runs
Round 2	Scorecard	19 January	Andhra	Chhattisgarh	Chhattisgarh won by 7 wickets
Round 3	Scorecard	21 January	Gujarat	Madhya Pradesh	Madhya Pradesh won by 131 runs
Round 3	Scorecard	21 January	Andhra	Uttar Pradesh	Uttar Pradesh won by 21 runs
Round 3	Scorecard	21 January	Chhattisgarh	Manipur	Chhattisgarh won by 181 runs
Round 4	Scorecard	23 January	Madhya Pradesh	Tripura	Madhya Pradesh won by 78 runs
Round 4	Scorecard	23 January	Chhattisgarh	Uttar Pradesh	Uttar Pradesh won by 4 wickets
Round 4	Scorecard	23 January	Andhra	Gujarat	Andhra won by 8 wickets
Round 5	Scorecard	25 January	Madhya Pradesh	Uttar Pradesh	Uttar Pradesh won by 32 runs
Round 5	Scorecard	25 January	Chhattisgarh	Gujarat	Gujarat won by 9 wickets
Round 5	Scorecard	25 January	Manipur	Tripura	Tripura won by 118 runs
Round 6	Scorecard	27 January	Madhya Pradesh	Manipur	Madhya Pradesh won by 8 wickets
Round 6	Scorecard	27 January	Gujarat	Uttar Pradesh	Uttar Pradesh won by 55 runs
Round 6	Scorecard	27 January	Andhra	Tripura	Andhra won by 6 wickets
Round 7	Scorecard	29 January	Andhra	Madhya Pradesh	Madhya Pradesh won by 27 runs
Round 7	Scorecard	29 January	Manipur	Uttar Pradesh	Uttar Pradesh won by 113 runs
Round 7	Scorecard	29 January	Chhattisgarh	Tripura	Tripura won by 4 wickets

== Knockout stages ==
Pre-quarterfinals
B3	Tamil Nadu	115
A2	Railways	119/2
B2	Karnataka	168/3
E2	Madhya Pradesh	166/9
C2	Rajasthan	197/8
D2	Vidarbha	158

Quarterfinals
A1	Kerala	265
A2	Railways	334/5
D1	Uttarakhand	207/7
E1	Uttar Pradesh	204/4
B1	Delhi	199
B2	Karnataka	203/6
C1	Punjab	173/8
C2	Rajasthan	242/5

Semi-finals
A2	Railways	224/8
D1	Uttarakhand	207/9
B2	Karnataka	256/8
C2	Rajasthan	199

Final
A2	Railways	169/6
B2	Karnataka	163

=== Pre-quarterfinals ===
1 February 2023
Scorecard

Tamil Nadu; 115 (45.2 overs)	v	Railways; 119/2 (27.2 overs)
Manisundar Shailaja 31 (92); Arundhati Reddy 4/30 (10 overs)		Mona Meshram 37* (34); Nida Rehman 1/13 (3 overs)

Railways won by 8 wickets
JSCA International Stadium Complex, Ranchi
Umpires: Shaktipada Bhattacharya and Ramesh KN

- Railways won the toss and elected to field.

1 February 2023
Scorecard

Madhya Pradesh; 166/9 (50 overs)	v	Karnataka; 168/3 (36.3 overs)
Manjiri Gawade 40 (74); Venkateshappa Chandu 3/28 (10 overs)		Veda Krishnamurthy 44* (30); Salonee Dangore 2/32 (7 overs)

Karnataka won by 7 wickets
JSCA Oval Ground, Ranchi
Umpires: Ranjeev Sharma and Vineet Kulkarni

- Madhya Pradesh won the toss and elected to bat.

1 February 2023
Scorecard

Rajasthan; 197/8 (50 overs)	v	Vidarbha; 158 (46.2 overs)
Babita Meena 59 (94); Arya Gohane 2/34 (10 overs)		Kanchan Nagwani 43 (61); Shanu Sen 3/15 (8.2 overs)

Rajasthan won by 39 runs
Metallurgical & Engineering Consultant Ltd Sail Stadium, Ranchi
Umpires: K Srinivasan and Yashodhan Gavankar

- Rajasthan won the toss and elected to bat.

=== Quarter-finals ===
2 February 2023
Scorecard

Uttar Pradesh; 204/4 (50 overs)	v	Uttarakhand; 207/7 (48.2 overs)
Nishu Choudhary 51* (43); Raghvi Bist 2/29 (10 overs)		Kanchan Parihar 51 (86); Shilpi Yadav 3/47 (10 overs)

Uttarakhand won by 3 wickets
JSCA International Stadium Complex, Ranchi
Umpires: Shaktipada Bhattacharya and Vineet Kulkarni

- Uttarakhand won the toss and elected to field.

3 February 2023
Scorecard

Railways; 334/5 (50 overs)	v	Kerala; 265 (49 overs)
Dayalan Hemalatha 107 (79); Keerthy James 2/73 (10 overs)		Vinod Drishya 53 (69); Swagatika Rath 4/40 (10 overs)

Railways won by 69 runs
JSCA Oval Ground, Ranchi
Umpires: Shaktipada Bhattacharya and Ramesh KN

- Kerala won the toss and elected to field.

3 February 2023
Scorecard

Delhi; 199 (49.4 overs)	v	Karnataka; 203/6 (38.4 overs)
Priya Punia 67 (97); Shreyanka Patil 3/30 (10 overs)		Dinesh Vrinda 62 (70); Parunika Sisodia 3/55 (10 overs)

Karnataka won by 4 wickets
Metallurgical & Engineering Consultant Ltd Sail Stadium, Ranchi
Umpires: Vineet Kulkarni and Ranjeev Sharma

- Karnataka won the toss and elected to field.

3 February 2023
Scorecard

Rajasthan; 242/5 (50 overs)	v	Punjab; 173/8 (50 overs)
Ayushi Garg 105 (136); Komalpreet Kour 1/27 (8 overs)		Mehak Kesar 39* (45); Shanu Sen 3/30 (10 overs)

Rajasthan won by 69 runs
JSCA International Stadium Complex, Ranchi
Umpires: Yashodhan Gavankar and BK Ravi

- Punjab won the toss and elected to field.

=== Semi-finals ===
5 February 2023
Scorecard

Railways; 224/8 (50 overs)	v	Uttarakhand; 207/9 (50 overs)
Mona Meshram 72 (101); Mansi Joshi 3/31 (10 overs)		Neelam Bhandari 38 (49); Swagatika Rath 5/32 (10 overs)

Railways won by 17 runs
JSCA International Stadium Complex, Ranchi
Umpires: Ranjeev Sharma and BK Ravi

- Uttarakhand won the toss and elected to field.

5 February 2023
Scorecard

Karnataka; 256/8 (50 overs)	v	Rajasthan; 199 (45 overs)
Dinesh Vrinda 81 (104); BR Meena 3/48 (10 overs)		Ayushi Garg 71 (105); Sahana Pawar 4/41 (10 overs)

Karnataka won by 57 runs
JSCA Oval Ground, Ranchi
Umpires: Nitin Pandit and Yashodhan Gavankar

- Rajasthan won the toss and elected to field.

=== Final ===
7 February 2023
Scorecard

Karnataka; 163 (49.4 overs)	v	Railways; 169/6 (47.3 overs)
Gnanananda Divya 69 (116); Tanuja Kanwer 3/26 (10 overs)		Dayalan Hemalatha 38* (57); Shreyanka Patil 3/45 (9.3 overs)

Railways won by 4 wickets
JSCA International Stadium Complex, Ranchi
Umpires: Nitin Pandit and Abhijit Bhattacharya

- Railways won the toss and elected to field.

== Statistics ==
=== Most runs ===
Player	Team	Matches	Innings	Runs	Average	HS	100s	50s
Jasia Akhtar	Rajasthan	9	9	501	62.63	155*	2	1
Priya Punia	Delhi	8	8	494	82.33	105	1	5
Dinesh Vrinda	Karnataka	11	11	477	47.70	91*	0	3
Mona Meshram	Railways	11	10	442	88.40	85	0	4
Ayushi Garg	Rajasthan	8	8	413	68.83	148*	2	1

Source: CricketArchive

=== Most wickets ===
Player	Team	Overs	Wickets	Average	5w
Parunika Sisodia	Delhi	77.0	21	10.14	0
Poonam Yadav	Railways	83.5	21	12.38	1
Swagatika Rath	Railways	75.4	20	11.35	1
Shreyanka Patil	Karnataka	75.4	20	17.65	0
Kanchan Nagwani	Vidarbha	62.1	19	5.68	1

Source: CricketArchive
