= 2022–23 Senior Women's T20 Trophy =

Domestic cricket competition

- Dates: 11 October – 5 November 2022
- Administrator: BCCI
- Cricket format: Twenty20
- Tournament format(s): Round-robin tournament and Playoff
- Host: India
- Champions: Railways (11th title)
- Runners-up: Bengal
- Participants: 37
- Matches: 129
- Most runs: Disha Kasat (300)
- Most wickets: Anjali Sarvani (17)
- Official website: bcci.tv

The 2022–23 Senior Women's T20 Trophy was the 14th edition of the Senior Women's T20 Trophy, the domestic women's T20 competition in India. The tournament took place between 11 October and 5 November 2022, with 37 teams divided into five groups. Railways, the defending champions, won the tournament, claiming their eleventh T20 title.

== Competition format ==
37 teams competed in the tournament, divided into two groups of eight and three groups of seven, playing each other side in their group once. The winner of each group progressed straight to the quarter-finals, whilst the second-placed team in each group and the best third-placed team progressed to the pre-quarter-finals. Matches were played using a Twenty20 format.

The groups worked on a points system with positions within the groups being based on the total points. Points were awarded as follows:

Win: 4 points.
Tie: 2 points.
Loss: 0 points.
No Result/Abandoned: 2 points.

If points in the final table were equal, teams were separated by most wins, then head-to-head record, then Net Run Rate.

== League stage ==
=== Points tables ===
==== Group A ====
Team	P	W	L	T	NR	Pts	NRR
Andhra (Q)	7	6	1	0	0	24	+2.131
Tripura (Q)	7	4	2	0	1	18	+0.809
Uttar Pradesh	7	3	1	0	3	18	+2.090
Hyderabad	7	4	3	0	0	16	+0.175
Odisha	7	3	2	0	2	16	+0.225
Nagaland	7	2	4	0	1	10	–0.310
Meghalaya	7	1	5	0	1	6	–1.785
Mizoram	7	1	6	0	0	4	–2.181

==== Group B ====
Team	P	W	L	T	NR	Pts	NRR
Railways (Q)	7	6	0	0	1	26	+2.792
Madhya Pradesh (Q)	7	5	1	0	1	22	+1.139
Tamil Nadu (Q)	7	5	2	0	0	20	+1.159
Goa	7	4	3	0	0	16	+0.473
Gujarat	7	2	4	0	1	10	–0.738
Jammu and Kashmir	7	2	4	0	1	10	+0.208
Bihar	7	1	5	0	1	6	–1.514
Arunachal Pradesh	7	0	6	0	1	2	–4.524

==== Group C ====
Team	P	W	L	T	NR	Pts	NRR
Vidarbha (Q)	6	5	1	0	0	20	+0.639
Bengal (Q)	6	4	2	0	0	16	+1.436
Mumbai	6	4	2	0	0	16	+1.277
Baroda	6	3	3	0	0	12	–0.616
Pondicherry	6	3	3	0	0	12	–0.348
Chandigarh	6	2	4	0	0	8	–0.761
Saurashtra	6	0	6	0	0	0	–1.194

==== Group D ====
Team	P	W	L	T	NR	Pts	NRR
Maharashtra (Q)	6	4	2	0	0	16	+1.132
Himachal Pradesh (Q)	6	3	1	0	2	16	+1.235
Delhi	6	3	2	0	1	14	+0.874
Karnataka	6	3	2	0	1	14	+0.734
Haryana	6	3	2	0	1	14	+0.714
Assam	6	1	4	0	1	6	–1.061
Manipur	6	0	4	0	2	4	–4.733

==== Group E ====
Team	P	W	L	T	NR	Pts	NRR
Rajasthan (Q)	6	5	1	0	0	20	+2.179
Jharkhand (Q)	6	4	2	0	0	16	+0.896
Kerala	6	3	2	0	1	14	+1.366
Punjab	6	3	3	0	0	12	+0.671
Chhattisgarh	6	2	3	0	1	10	–0.508
Uttarakhand	6	2	3	0	1	10	+0.346
Sikkim	6	0	5	0	1	2	–6.028

- Advanced to the quarter-finals.
- Advanced to the pre-quarter-finals.

Source: BCCI

=== Fixtures ===
==== Group A ====
Round	Scorecard	Date	Team 1	Team 2	Result
Round 1	Scorecard	11 October	Hyderabad	Meghalaya	Hyderabad won by 28 runs
Round 1	Scorecard	11 October	Mizoram	Uttar Pradesh	Uttar Pradesh won by 85 runs
Round 1	Scorecard	11 October	Andhra	Odisha	Andhra won by 9 wickets
Round 1	Scorecard	11 October	Nagaland	Tripura	Tripura won by 48 runs
Round 2	Scorecard	12 October	Nagaland	Odisha	Odisha won by 13 runs (VJD method)
Round 2	Scorecard	12 October	Meghalaya	Tripura	Tripura won by 14 runs (VJD method)
Round 2	Scorecard	12 October	Andhra	Uttar Pradesh	Uttar Pradesh won by 6 runs
Round 2	Scorecard	12 October	Hyderabad	Mizoram	Hyderabad won by 10 wickets
Round 3	Scorecard	14 October	Tripura	Uttar Pradesh	Match Abandoned
Round 3	Scorecard	14 October	Andhra	Meghalaya	Andhra won by 9 wickets
Round 3	Scorecard	14 October	Hyderabad	Odisha	Odisha won by 8 wickets
Round 3	Scorecard	14 October	Nagaland	Mizoram	Nagaland won by 31 runs
Round 4	Scorecard	16 October	Meghalaya	Odisha	No Result
Round 4	Scorecard	16 October	Nagaland	Uttar Pradesh	No Result
Round 4	Scorecard	16 October	Mizoram	Tripura	Tripura won by 66 runs
Round 4	Scorecard	16 October	Andhra	Hyderabad	Andhra won by 10 wickets
Round 5	Scorecard	18 October	Andhra	Mizoram	Andhra won by 7 wickets
Round 5	Scorecard	18 October	Hyderabad	Tripura	Hyderabad won by 6 wickets
Round 5	Scorecard	18 October	Meghalaya	Nagaland	Meghalaya won by 9 wickets (VJD method)
Round 5	Scorecard	18 October	Odisha	Uttar Pradesh	No Result
Round 6	Scorecard	20 October	Hyderabad	Uttar Pradesh	Hyderabad won by 13 runs
Round 6	Scorecard	20 October	Andhra	Nagaland	Andhra won by 8 wickets
Round 6	Scorecard	20 October	Meghalaya	Mizoram	Mizoram won by 8 wickets
Round 6	Scorecard	20 October	Odisha	Tripura	Tripura won by 10 runs
Round 7	Scorecard	22 October	Andhra	Tripura	Andhra won by 8 wickets
Round 7	Scorecard	22 October	Mizoram	Odisha	Odisha won by 25 runs
Round 7	Scorecard	22 October	Hyderabad	Nagaland	Nagaland won by 8 wickets
Round 7	Scorecard	22 October	Meghalaya	Uttar Pradesh	Uttar Pradesh won by 62 runs

==== Group B ====
Round	Scorecard	Date	Team 1	Team 2	Result
Round 1	Scorecard	11 October	Gujarat	Jammu and Kashmir	Gujarat won by 8 wickets
Round 1	Scorecard	11 October	Arunachal Pradesh	Tamil Nadu	Tamil Nadu won by 10 wickets
Round 1	Scorecard	11 October	Goa	Railways	Railways won by 56 runs
Round 1	Scorecard	11 October	Bihar	Madhya Pradesh	Madhya Pradesh won by 7 wickets
Round 2	Scorecard	12 October	Bihar	Railways	No Result
Round 2	Scorecard	12 October	Jammu and Kashmir	Madhya Pradesh	Match Abandoned
Round 2	Scorecard	12 October	Goa	Tamil Nadu	Tamil Nadu won by 15 runs
Round 2	Scorecard	12 October	Arunachal Pradesh	Gujarat	Match Abandoned
Round 3	Scorecard	14 October	Madhya Pradesh	Tamil Nadu	Madhya Pradesh won by 5 wickets
Round 3	Scorecard	14 October	Goa	Jammu and Kashmir	Goa won by 28 runs
Round 3	Scorecard	14 October	Gujarat	Railways	Railways won by 8 wickets
Round 3	Scorecard	14 October	Arunachal Pradesh	Bihar	Bihar won by 62 runs
Round 4	Scorecard	16 October	Jammu and Kashmir	Railways	Railways won by 82 runs
Round 4	Scorecard	16 October	Tamil Nadu	Bihar	Tamil Nadu won by 37 runs
Round 4	Scorecard	16 October	Arunachal Pradesh	Madhya Pradesh	Madhya Pradesh won by 88 runs
Round 4	Scorecard	16 October	Goa	Gujarat	Goa won by 4 wickets
Round 5	Scorecard	18 October	Arunachal Pradesh	Goa	Goa won by 9 wickets
Round 5	Scorecard	18 October	Gujarat	Madhya Pradesh	Madhya Pradesh won by 9 wickets
Round 5	Scorecard	18 October	Bihar	Jammu and Kashmir	Jammu and Kashmir won by 95 runs
Round 5	Scorecard	18 October	Railways	Tamil Nadu	Railways won by 9 runs
Round 6	Scorecard	20 October	Gujarat	Tamil Nadu	Tamil Nadu won by 47 runs
Round 6	Scorecard	20 October	Bihar	Goa	Goa won by 5 wickets
Round 6	Scorecard	20 October	Arunachal Pradesh	Jammu and Kashmir	Jammu and Kashmir won by 85 runs
Round 6	Scorecard	20 October	Madhya Pradesh	Railways	Railways won by 9 wickets
Round 7	Scorecard	22 October	Goa	Madhya Pradesh	Madhya Pradesh won by 7 wickets
Round 7	Scorecard	22 October	Arunachal Pradesh	Railways	Railways won by 10 wickets
Round 7	Scorecard	22 October	Bihar	Gujarat	Gujarat won by 10 wickets
Round 7	Scorecard	22 October	Jammu and Kashmir	Tamil Nadu	Tamil Nadu won by 8 wickets

==== Group C ====
Round	Scorecard	Date	Team 1	Team 2	Result
Round 1	Scorecard	11 October	Chandigarh	Pondicherry	Pondicherry won by 9 wickets
Round 1	Scorecard	11 October	Bengal	Mumbai	Bengal won by 6 runs
Round 1	Scorecard	11 October	Baroda	Vidarbha	Vidarbha won by 9 wickets
Round 2	Scorecard	12 October	Baroda	Chandigarh	Chandigarh won by 12 runs
Round 2	Scorecard	12 October	Bengal	Vidarbha	Vidarbha won by 5 wickets
Round 2	Scorecard	12 October	Pondicherry	Saurashtra	Pondicherry won by 25 runs
Round 3	Scorecard	14 October	Bengal	Saurashtra	Bengal won by 7 wickets
Round 3	Scorecard	14 October	Baroda	Pondicherry	Baroda won by 8 wickets
Round 3	Scorecard	14 October	Chandigarh	Mumbai	Mumbai won by 6 runs (VJD method)
Round 4	Scorecard	16 October	Baroda	Mumbai	Mumbai won by 66 runs
Round 4	Scorecard	16 October	Chandigarh	Saurashtra	Chandigarh won by 36 runs
Round 4	Scorecard	16 October	Pondicherry	Vidarbha	Vidarbha won by 14 runs
Round 5	Scorecard	18 October	Saurashtra	Vidarbha	Vidarbha won by 9 wickets
Round 5	Scorecard	18 October	Mumbai	Pondicherry	Pondicherry won by 6 runs
Round 5	Scorecard	18 October	Baroda	Bengal	Baroda won by 7 wickets
Round 6	Scorecard	20 October	Mumbai	Vidarbha	Mumbai won by 51 runs
Round 6	Scorecard	20 October	Baroda	Saurashtra	Baroda won by 7 wickets
Round 6	Scorecard	20 October	Bengal	Chandigarh	Bengal won by 80 runs
Round 7	Scorecard	22 October	Bengal	Pondicherry	Bengal won by 10 wickets
Round 7	Scorecard	22 October	Chandigarh	Vidarbha	Vidarbha won by 6 wickets
Round 7	Scorecard	22 October	Mumbai	Saurashtra	Mumbai won by 12 runs

==== Group D ====
Round	Scorecard	Date	Team 1	Team 2	Result
Round 1	Scorecard	11 October	Karnataka	Manipur	No Result
Round 1	Scorecard	11 October	Delhi	Maharashtra	Delhi won by 10 runs
Round 1	Scorecard	11 October	Haryana	Himachal Pradesh	Match Abandoned
Round 2	Scorecard	12 October	Karnataka	Haryana	Karnataka won by 7 runs (VJD method)
Round 2	Scorecard	12 October	Delhi	Himachal Pradesh	No Result
Round 2	Scorecard	12 October	Assam	Manipur	Match Abandoned
Round 3	Scorecard	14 October	Assam	Delhi	Assam won by 6 runs
Round 3	Scorecard	14 October	Haryana	Manipur	Haryana won by 75 runs
Round 3	Scorecard	14 October	Karnataka	Maharashtra	Maharashtra won by 5 wickets
Round 4	Scorecard	16 October	Haryana	Maharashtra	Maharashtra won by 8 wickets
Round 4	Scorecard	16 October	Assam	Karnataka	Karnataka won by 9 wickets
Round 4	Scorecard	16 October	Himachal Pradesh	Manipur	Himachal Pradesh won by 10 wickets
Round 5	Scorecard	18 October	Assam	Himachal Pradesh	Himachal Pradesh won by 9 wickets
Round 5	Scorecard	18 October	Maharashtra	Manipur	Maharashtra won by 10 wickets
Round 5	Scorecard	18 October	Delhi	Haryana	Haryana won by 6 wickets
Round 6	Scorecard	20 October	Himachal Pradesh	Maharashtra	Himachal Pradesh won by 2 wickets
Round 6	Scorecard	20 October	Assam	Haryana	Haryana won by 6 wickets
Round 6	Scorecard	20 October	Delhi	Karnataka	Delhi won by 3 wickets
Round 7	Scorecard	22 October	Delhi	Manipur	Delhi won by 93 runs
Round 7	Scorecard	22 October	Himachal Pradesh	Karnataka	Karnataka won by 7 wickets
Round 7	Scorecard	22 October	Assam	Maharashtra	Maharashtra won by 3 wickets

==== Group E ====
Round	Scorecard	Date	Team 1	Team 2	Result
Round 1	Scorecard	11 October	Jharkhand	Punjab	Jharkhand won by 6 wickets
Round 1	Scorecard	11 October	Chhattisgarh	Sikkim	Chhattisgarh won by 87 runs
Round 1	Scorecard	11 October	Kerala	Rajasthan	Rajasthan won by 14 runs
Round 2	Scorecard	12 October	Chhattisgarh	Jharkhand	Jharkhand won by 59 runs
Round 2	Scorecard	12 October	Punjab	Rajasthan	Punjab won by 7 wickets
Round 2	Scorecard	12 October	Sikkim	Uttarakhand	Match Abandoned
Round 3	Scorecard	14 October	Rajasthan	Uttarakhand	Rajasthan won by 5 wickets
Round 3	Scorecard	14 October	Jharkhand	Sikkim	Jharkhand won by 9 wickets
Round 3	Scorecard	14 October	Chhattisgarh	Kerala	No Result
Round 4	Scorecard	16 October	Jharkhand	Kerala	Jharkhand won by 15 runs
Round 4	Scorecard	16 October	Chhattisgarh	Uttarakhand	Chhattisgarh won by 4 runs
Round 4	Scorecard	16 October	Punjab	Sikkim	Punjab won by 95 runs
Round 5	Scorecard	18 October	Punjab	Uttarakhand	Uttarakhand won by 35 runs
Round 5	Scorecard	18 October	Kerala	Sikkim	Kerala won by 144 runs
Round 5	Scorecard	18 October	Jharkhand	Rajasthan	Rajasthan won by 53 runs
Round 6	Scorecard	20 October	Kerala	Punjab	Kerala won by 14 runs
Round 6	Scorecard	20 October	Jharkhand	Uttarakhand	Uttarakhand won by 10 runs
Round 6	Scorecard	20 October	Chhattisgarh	Rajasthan	Rajasthan won by 54 runs
Round 7	Scorecard	22 October	Rajasthan	Sikkim	Rajasthan won by 139 runs
Round 7	Scorecard	22 October	Chhattisgarh	Punjab	Punjab won by 7 wickets
Round 7	Scorecard	22 October	Kerala	Uttarakhand	Kerala won by 2 wickets

== Knockout stages ==
Pre-quarter-finals
B3	Tamil Nadu	117/7
B2	Madhya Pradesh	118/3
A2	Tripura	113/8
D2	Himachal Pradesh	115/3
E2	Jharkhand	86/9
C2	Bengal	90/4

Quarter-finals
B2	Madhya Pradesh	40
B1	Railways	44/0
D1	Maharashtra	112/5
C1	Vidarbha	113/3
A1	Andhra	114/7
D2	Himachal Pradesh	118/3
C2	Bengal	121/7
E1	Rajasthan	103/5

Semi-finals
B1	Railways	88/1
C1	Vidarbha	87/8
D2	Himachal Pradesh	NR
C2	Bengal	NR

Final
B1	Railways	108/4
C2	Bengal	106/7

=== Pre-quarter-finals ===
30 October 2022
Scorecard

Tamil Nadu; 117/7 (20 overs)	v	Madhya Pradesh; 118/3 (18.5 overs)
Sundaresan Anusha 50 (38); Nikita Singh 2/29 (4 overs)		Neha Badwaik 40 (40); A Eloksi 1/10 (2 overs)

Madhya Pradesh won by 7 wickets
M. Chinnaswamy Stadium, Bangalore
Umpires: Vrinda Rathi and Pashchim Pathak

- Tamil Nadu won the toss and elected to bat.

30 October 2022
Scorecard

Jharkhand; 86/9 (17 overs)	v	Bengal; 90/4 (14.3 overs)
Monika Murmu 21 (18); Saika Ishaque 3/25 (4 overs)		Dhara Gujjar 49* (39); DK Ashwani 2/10 (1 over)

Bengal won by 6 wickets
Three Ovals KSCA Stadium, Bangalore
Umpires: Abhijeet Bengeri and Ramesh KN

- Bengal won the toss and elected to field.
- Match reduced to 17 overs per side due to rain.

30 October 2022
Scorecard

Tripura; 113/8 (20 overs)	v	Himachal Pradesh; 115/3 (16.1 overs)
Maman Rabidas 32 (32); Prachi Chauhan 2/21 (3 overs)		Sushma Verma 40* (38); Maman Rabidas 1/15 (3 overs)

Himachal Pradesh won by 7 wickets
M. Chinnaswamy Stadium, Bangalore
Umpires: Narayanan Janani and Bhavesh Patel

- Himachal Pradesh won the toss and elected to field.

=== Quarter-finals ===
1 November 2022
Scorecard

Madhya Pradesh; 40 (16 overs)	v	Railways; 44/0 (9.1 overs)
Aashna Patidar 9 (8); Anjali Sarvani 3/7 (3 overs)		Sabbhineni Meghana 29* (29)

Railways won by 10 wickets
M. Chinnaswamy Stadium, Bangalore
Umpires: Gayathri Venugopalan and Abhijeet Bengeri

- Railways won the toss and elected to field.

1 November 2022
Scorecard

Bengal; 121/7 (20 overs)	v	Rajasthan; 103/5 (20 overs)
Dhara Gujjar 30* (24); Sonal Kalal 3/27 (4 overs)		Suman Meena 28* (31); Sukanya Parida 2/16 (4 overs)

Bengal won by 18 runs
Three Ovals KSCA Stadium, Bangalore
Umpires: Narayanan Janani and Pashchim Pathak

- Rajasthan won the toss and elected to field.

1 November 2022
Scorecard

Maharashtra; 112/5 (20 overs)	v	Vidarbha; 113/3 (18.2 overs)
Tejal Hasabnis 49* (48); Komal Zanzad 2/9 (4 overs)		Disha Kasat 53* (48); Priyanka Garkhede 1/10 (2 overs)

Vidarbha won by 7 wickets
Three Ovals KSCA Stadium, Bangalore
Umpires: Ramesh KN and Bhavesh Pate

- Vidarbha won the toss and elected to field.

1 November 2022
Scorecard

Andhra; 114/7 (20 overs)	v	Himachal Pradesh; 118/3 (19.1 overs)
Pushpa Latha 35 (26); Harleen Deol 2/12 (2 overs)		Sushma Verma 68* (58); Saranya Gadwal 1/18 (4 overs)

Himachal Pradesh won by 7 wickets
M. Chinnaswamy Stadium, Bangalore
Umpires: Gayathri Venugopalan and Vrinda Rathi

- Himachal Pradesh won the toss and elected to field.

=== Semi-finals ===
3 November 2022
Scorecard

Vidarbha; 87/8 (20 overs)	v	Railways; 88/1 (15.4 overs)
Bharti Fulmali 20 (25); Sneh Rana 3/19 (4 overs)		Nuzhat Parween 44* (50); Komal Zanzad 1/20 (4 overs)

Railways won by 9 wickets
M. Chinnaswamy Stadium, Bangalore
Umpires: Gayathri Venugopalan and Pashchim Pathak

- Railways won the toss and elected to field.

3 November 2022
Scorecard

Himachal Pradesh; 79/4 (13 overs)	v	Bengal; 29/3 (4.5 overs)
Nikita Chauhan 30* (36); Deepti Sharma 3/12 (3 overs)		Deepti Sharma 11 (9); Sushmita Kumari 1/6 (1 over)

No Result
M. Chinnaswamy Stadium, Bangalore
Umpires: Vrinda Rathi and Bhavesh Patel

- Bengal won the toss and elected to field.
- Match reduced to 13 overs per side due to rain.
- Bengal target was 88 in 13 overs.
- No further play possible due to rain.
- Bengal progressed to the final by virtue of a better group stage record.

=== Final ===
5 November 2022
Scorecard

Bengal; 106/7 (20 overs)	v	Railways; 108/4 (18.2 overs)
Richa Ghosh 32 (26); Anjali Sarvani 3/6 (3 overs)		Dayalan Hemalatha 35 (23); Gouher Sultana 2/23 (4 overs)

Railways won by 6 wickets
M. Chinnaswamy Stadium, Bangalore
Umpires: Vrinda Rathi and Gayathri Venugopalan

- Bengal won the toss and elected to bat.

== Statistics ==
=== Most runs ===
Player	Team	Matches	Innings	Runs	Average	HS	100s	50s
Disha Kasat	Vidarbha	8	8	300	60.00	60	0	2
Jasia Akhtar	Rajasthan	7	7	273	45.50	125*	1	2
Sushma Verma	Himachal Pradesh	9	7	137	79.00	68*	0	1
DK Ashwani	Jharkhand	7	7	237	39.50	95	0	2
Yastika Bhatia	Baroda	6	6	223	74.33	64*	0	1

Source: BCCI

=== Most wickets ===
Player	Team	Overs	Wickets	Average	5w
Anjali Sarvani	Railways	29.0	17	5.70	0
Sonal Kalal	Rajasthan	28.0	14	8.35	0
Ekta Bisht	Uttarakhand	19.0	13	6.92	1
Puja Das	Tripura	17.0	12	7.50	1
Sahana Pawar	Karnataka	23.0	11	10.18	0

Source: BCCI
