= 2021–22 Senior Women's One Day Trophy =

Domestic cricket tournament

2021–22 Women's Senior One Day Trophy
- Dates: 28 October – 20 November 2021
- Administrator(s): BCCI
- Cricket format: List A
- Tournament format(s): Round-robin and Playoffs
- Host(s): India
- Champions: Railways (13th title)
- Runners-up: Karnataka
- Participants: 37
- Matches: 106
- Most runs: Sabbhineni Meghana (388)
- Most wickets: Rashi Kanojiya (15); Kanika Ahuja (15)
- Official website: BCCI

The 2021–22 Women's Senior One Day Trophy was the 16th edition of the women's List A cricket competition in India. It took place from 28 October to 20 November 2021, with 37 teams competing in six round-robin divisions. Railways, who were the defending champions, won their 13th one-day title, beating Karnataka in the final.

== Competition format ==
The 37 teams competing in the tournament were divided into the Elite Group and the Plate Group, with the teams in the Elite Group further divided into Groups A, B, C, D and E. Each group took place in one host city, under COVID-19 protocols. The top two teams in each Elite Group progressed to the knockout stages, along with the top team from the Plate Group. The five Elite Group winners progressed straight to the quarter-finals, whilst the remaining six teams competed in the pre-quarter-finals.

The groups worked on a points system with positions within the groups based on the total points of each team. Points were awarded as follows:

Win: 4 points.
Tie: 2 points.
Loss: 0 points.
No Result/Abandoned: 2 points.

If points in the final table were equal, teams were separated by most wins, then head-to-head record, then Net Run Rate.

== League stage ==
=== Points tables ===
==== Elite Group A ====
Team	P	W	L	T	NR	Pts	NRR
Maharashtra (Q)	5	5	0	0	0	20	+1.567
Delhi (Q)	5	4	1	0	0	16	+0.294
Kerala	5	3	2	0	0	12	+1.156
Jharkhand	5	1	4	0	0	4	–0.472
Assam	5	1	4	0	0	4	–0.960
Tripura	5	1	4	0	0	4	–1.301

==== Elite Group B ====
Team	P	W	L	T	NR	Pts	NRR
Railways (Q)	5	5	0	0	0	20	+3.773
Odisha (Q)	5	4	1	0	0	16	+0.063
Uttarakhand	5	2	3	0	0	8	–0.156
Mumbai	5	2	3	0	0	8	–0.262
Tamil Nadu	5	2	3	0	0	8	–0.449
Chandigarh	5	0	5	0	0	0	–2.273

==== Elite Group C ====
Team	P	W	L	T	NR	Pts	NRR
Bengal (Q)	5	5	0	0	0	20	+1.804
Punjab (Q)	5	4	1	0	0	16	+0.440
Rajasthan	5	3	2	0	0	12	+0.098
Andhra	5	2	3	0	0	8	–0.039
Himachal Pradesh	5	1	4	0	0	4	–1.030
Hyderabad	5	0	5	0	0	0	–1.425

==== Elite Group D ====
Team	P	W	L	T	NR	Pts	NRR
Madhya Pradesh (Q)	5	5	0	0	0	20	+1.482
Goa (Q)	5	4	1	0	0	16	+0.891
Vidarbha	5	2	2	0	1	10	+2.098
Gujarat	5	2	2	0	1	10	+0.067
Haryana	5	1	4	0	0	4	–0.751
Mizoram	5	0	5	0	0	0	–4.417

==== Elite Group E ====
Team	P	W	L	T	NR	Pts	NRR
Karnataka (Q)	5	5	0	0	0	20	+2.646
Uttar Pradesh (Q)	5	4	1	0	0	16	+1.364
Baroda	5	3	2	0	0	12	+0.494
Saurashtra	5	2	3	0	0	8	–0.753
Chhattisgarh	5	1	4	0	0	4	–1.199
Pondicherry	5	0	5	0	0	0	–2.173

==== Plate Group ====
Team	P	W	L	T	NR	Pts	NRR
Jammu and Kashmir (Q)	6	5	1	0	0	20	+1.126
Nagaland	6	5	1	0	0	20	+1.021
Meghalaya	6	4	2	0	0	16	+0.025
Bihar	6	3	3	0	0	12	+0.117
Manipur	6	3	3	0	0	12	–0.291
Sikkim	6	1	5	0	0	4	–0.714
Arunachal Pradesh	6	0	6	0	0	0	–1.448

Source: BCCI

- advanced to the quarter-finals.
- advanced to the pre-quarter-finals.

=== Fixtures ===
==== Elite Group A ====
Round	Scorecard	Date	Team 1	Team 2	Result
Round 1	Scorecard	31 October	Tripura	Maharashtra	Maharashtra won by 8 wickets
Round 1	Scorecard	31 October	Jharkhand	Delhi	Delhi won by 24 runs
Round 1	Scorecard	31 October	Assam	Kerala	Kerala won by 6 wickets
Round 2	Scorecard	1 November	Jharkhand	Maharashtra	Maharashtra won by 5 wickets
Round 2	Scorecard	1 November	Tripura	Assam	Assam won by 27 runs
Round 2	Scorecard	1 November	Kerala	Delhi	Delhi won by 8 runs
Round 3	Scorecard	3 November	Jharkhand	Kerala	Kerala won by 7 wickets
Round 3	Scorecard	3 November	Tripura	Delhi	Delhi won by 7 wickets
Round 3	Scorecard	3 November	Assam	Maharashtra	Maharashtra won by 8 wickets
Round 4	Scorecard	4 November	Tripura	Kerala	Kerala won by 175 runs
Round 4	Scorecard	4 November	Jharkhand	Assam	Jharkhand won by 44 runs
Round 4	Scorecard	4 November	Maharashtra	Delhi	Maharashtra won by 8 wickets
Round 5	Scorecard	6 November	Assam	Delhi	Delhi won by 72 runs
Round 5	Scorecard	6 November	Maharashtra	Kerala	Maharashtra won by 7 wickets
Round 5	Scorecard	6 November	Jharkhand	Tripura	Tripura won by 3 wickets

==== Elite Group B ====
Round	Scorecard	Date	Team 1	Team 2	Result
Round 1	Scorecard	31 October	Railways	Chandigarh	Railways won by 246 runs
Round 1	Scorecard	31 October	Odisha	Tamil Nadu	Odisha won by 8 wickets
Round 1	Scorecard	31 October	Uttarakhand	Mumbai	Uttarakhand won by 43 runs
Round 2	Scorecard	1 November	Odisha	Chandigarh	Odisha won by 35 runs
Round 2	Scorecard	1 November	Railways	Uttarakhand	Railways won by 8 wickets
Round 2	Scorecard	1 November	Mumbai	Tamil Nadu	Mumbai won by 43 runs
Round 3	Scorecard	3 November	Odisha	Mumbai	Odisha won by 69 runs
Round 3	Scorecard	3 November	Railways	Tamil Nadu	Railways won by 8 wickets
Round 3	Scorecard	3 November	Uttarakhand	Chandigarh	Uttarakhand won by 103 runs
Round 4	Scorecard	4 November	Railways	Mumbai	Railways won by 9 wickets
Round 4	Scorecard	4 November	Odisha	Uttarakhand	Odisha won by 7 wickets
Round 4	Scorecard	4 November	Chandigarh	Tamil Nadu	Tamil Nadu won by 6 wickets
Round 5	Scorecard	6 November	Uttarakhand	Tamil Nadu	Tamil Nadu won by 6 wickets
Round 5	Scorecard	6 November	Chandigarh	Mumbai	Mumbai won by 112 runs
Round 5	Scorecard	6 November	Odisha	Railways	Railways won by 8 wickets

==== Elite Group C ====
Round	Scorecard	Date	Team 1	Team 2	Result
Round 1	Scorecard	31 October	Bengal	Rajasthan	Bengal won by 3 wickets
Round 1	Scorecard	31 October	Hyderabad	Himachal Pradesh	Himachal Pradesh won by 8 wickets
Round 1	Scorecard	31 October	Andhra	Punjab	Punjab won by 80 runs
Round 2	Scorecard	1 November	Hyderabad	Rajasthan	Rajasthan won by 7 wickets
Round 2	Scorecard	1 November	Bengal	Andhra	Bengal won by 7 wickets (VJD Method)
Round 2	Scorecard	1 November	Punjab	Himachal Pradesh	Punjab won by 19 runs (VJD Method)
Round 3	Scorecard	3 November	Hyderabad	Punjab	Punjab won by 5 wickets
Round 3	Scorecard	3 November	Bengal	Himachal Pradesh	Bengal won by 200 runs
Round 3	Scorecard	3 November	Andhra	Rajasthan	Rajasthan won by 2 runs
Round 4	Scorecard	4 November	Bengal	Punjab	Bnegal won by 4 runs
Round 4	Scorecard	4 November	Hyderabad	Andhra	Andhra won by 51 runs
Round 4	Scorecard	4 November	Rajasthan	Himachal Pradesh	Rajasthan won by 10 runs
Round 5	Scorecard	6 November	Andhra	Himachal Pradesh	Andhra won by 8 wickets
Round 5	Scorecard	6 November	Rajasthan	Punjab	Punjab won by 2 wickets
Round 5	Scorecard	6 November	Hyderabad	Bengal	Bengal won by 175 runs

==== Elite Group D ====
Round	Scorecard	Date	Team 1	Team 2	Result
Round 1	Scorecard	31 October	Haryana	Madhya Pradesh	Madhya Pradesh won by 5 wickets
Round 1	Scorecard	31 October	Gujarat	Mizoram	Gujarat won by 9 wickets
Round 1	Scorecard	31 October	Goa	Vidarbha	Goa won by 7 wickets
Round 2	Scorecard	1 November	Gujarat	Madhya Pradesh	Madhya Pradesh won by 137 runs
Round 2	Scorecard	1 November	Haryana	Goa	Goa won by 71 runs
Round 2	Scorecard	1 November	Vidarbha	Mizoram	Vidarbha won by 294 runs
Round 3	Scorecard	3 November	Gujarat	Vidarbha	No Result
Round 3	Scorecard	3 November	Haryana	Mizoram	Haryana won by 10 wickets
Round 3	Scorecard	3 November	Goa	Madhya Pradesh	Madhya Pradesh won by 45 runs (VJD Method)
Round 4	Scorecard	4 November	Haryana	Vidarbha	Vidarbha won by 147 runs
Round 4	Scorecard	4 November	Gujarat	Goa	Goa won by 7 wickets (VJD Method)
Round 4	Scorecard	4 November	Madhya Pradesh	Mizoram	Madhya Pradesh won by 6 wickets
Round 5	Scorecard	6 November	Goa	Mizoram	Goa won by 8 wickets
Round 5	Scorecard	6 November	Madhya Pradesh	Vidarbha	Madhya Pradesh won by 13 runs
Round 5	Scorecard	6 November	Gujarat	Haryana	Gujarat won by 53 runs

==== Elite Group E ====
Round	Scorecard	Date	Team 1	Team 2	Result
Round 1	Scorecard	31 October	Saurashtra	Baroda	Baroda won by 6 wickets
Round 1	Scorecard	31 October	Chhattisgarh	Pondicherry	Chhattisgarh won by 31 runs
Round 1	Scorecard	31 October	Uttar Pradesh	Karnataka	Karnataka won by 68 runs
Round 2	Scorecard	1 November	Chhattisgarh	Baroda	Baroda won by 140 runs
Round 2	Scorecard	1 November	Saurashtra	Uttar Pradesh	Uttar Pradesh won by 8 wickets
Round 2	Scorecard	1 November	Karnataka	Pondicherry	Karnataka won by 207 runs
Round 3	Scorecard	3 November	Chhattisgarh	Karnataka	Karnataka won by 7 wickets
Round 3	Scorecard	3 November	Saurashtra	Pondicherry	Saurashtra won by 7 runs
Round 3	Scorecard	3 November	Uttar Pradesh	Baroda	Uttar Pradesh won by 74 runs
Round 4	Scorecard	4 November	Saurashtra	Karnataka	Karnataka won by 10 wickets
Round 4	Scorecard	4 November	Chhattisgarh	Uttar Pradesh	Uttar Pradesh won by 74 runs
Round 4	Scorecard	4 November	Baroda	Pondicherry	Baroda won by 8 wickets
Round 5	Scorecard	6 November	Uttar Pradesh	Pondicherry	Uttar Pradesh won by 7 wickets
Round 5	Scorecard	6 November	Baroda	Karnataka	Karnataka won by 9 wickets
Round 5	Scorecard	6 November	Chhattisgarh	Saurashtra	Saurashtra won by 7 wickets

==== Plate Group ====
Round	Scorecard	Date	Team 1	Team 2	Result
Round 1	Scorecard	28 October	Bihar	Arunachal Pradesh	Bihar won by 80 runs
Round 1	Scorecard	28 October	Jammu and Kashmir	Sikkim	Jammu and Kashmir won by 9 wickets
Round 1	Scorecard	28 October	Nagaland	Manipur	Nagaland won by 91 runs (VJD Method)
Round 2	Scorecard	29 October	Jammu and Kashmir	Arunachal Pradesh	Jammu and Kashmir won by 95 runs
Round 2	Scorecard	29 October	Bihar	Manipur	Bihar won by 3 wickets
Round 2	Scorecard	29 October	Meghalaya	Sikkim	Meghalaya won by 5 wickets
Round 3	Scorecard	31 October	Nagaland	Jammu and Kashmir	Jammu and Kashmir won by 59 runs
Round 3	Scorecard	31 October	Meghalaya	Bihar	Meghalaya won by 22 runs
Round 3	Scorecard	31 October	Manipur	Arunachal Pradesh	Manipur won by 51 runs
Round 4	Scorecard	1 November	Meghalaya	Manipur	Manipur won by 39 runs
Round 4	Scorecard	1 November	Nagaland	Sikkim	Nagaland won by 5 wickets
Round 4	Scorecard	1 November	Jammu and Kashmir	Bihar	Jammu and Kashmir won by 5 wickets
Round 5	Scorecard	3 November	Nagaland	Meghalaya	Nagaland won by 40 runs
Round 5	Scorecard	3 November	Jammu and Kashmir	Manipur	Jammu and Kashmir won by 9 wickets
Round 5	Scorecard	3 November	Sikkim	Arunachal Pradesh	Sikkim won by 6 wickets
Round 6	Scorecard	4 November	Bihar	Sikkim	Bihar won by 36 runs
Round 6	Scorecard	4 November	Nagaland	Arunachal Pradesh	Nagaland won by 9 wickets
Round 6	Scorecard	4 November	Meghalaya	Jammu and Kashmir	Meghalaya won by 51 runs
Round 7	Scorecard	6 November	Manipur	Sikkim	Manipur won by 60 runs
Round 7	Scorecard	6 November	Meghalaya	Arunachal Pradesh	Meghalaya won by 12 runs
Round 7	Scorecard	6 November	Nagaland	Bihar	Nagaland won by 67 runs

== Knockout stages ==
Pre-quarter-finals
C2	Punjab	142/3
D2	Goa	179
A2	Delhi	87/2
P1	Jammu and Kashmir	85/8
B2	Odisha	100/5
E2	Uttar Pradesh	87

Quarter-finals
A1	Maharashtra	120/9
C2	Punjab	122/5
D1	Madhya Pradesh	169/9
E1	Karnataka	170/5
C1	Bengal	189/9
A2	Delhi	185/5
B1	Railways	271/9
B2	Odisha	122/7

Semi-finals
C2	Punjab	NR
E1	Karnataka	NR
C1	Bengal	NR
B1	Railways	NR

Final
E1	Karnataka	74
B1	Railways	76/2

=== Pre-quarter-finals ===
13 November 2021
Scorecard

Jammu and Kashmir; 85/8 (30 overs)	v	Delhi; 87/2 (25.4 overs)
Sarla Devi 18 (52); Soni Yadav 2/6 (4 overs)		Priya Punia 46* (87); Nadia Chowdhary 1/18 (3.4 overs)

Delhi won by 8 wickets
Three Ovals KSCA Stadium, Bangalore
Umpires: Pralhad Singh Rawat and Prem

- Delhi won the toss and elected to field.
- Match reduced to 30 overs per side due to rain.

13 November 2021
Scorecard

Odisha; 100/5 (24 overs)	v	Uttar Pradesh; 87 (21.4 overs)
Madhuri Mehta 31 (46 overs); Rashi Kanojiya 2/22 (5 overs)		Kshama Singh 18 (20); Rasanara Parwin 3/13 (4.4 overs)

Odisha won by 13 runs
Three Ovals KSCA Stadium, Bangalore
Umpires: Amit Bansal and Ganesh Charhate

- Uttar Pradesh won the toss and elected to field.
- Match reduced to 24 overs per side due to rain.

13 November 2021
Scorecard

Goa; 179 (48.3 overs)	v	Punjab; 142/3 (41.2 overs)
Shikha Pandey 49 (75); Neelam Bisht 3/23 (9.3 overs)		Parveen Khan 44* (96); Tejashwini Duragad 1/12 (4 overs)

Punjab won by 17 runs (VJD Method)
Three Ovals KSCA Stadium, Bangalore
Umpires: Nikhil Menon and Dharmesh Kumar Bhardwaj

- Punjab won the toss and elected to field.
- Rain curtailed Punjab's innings at 41.2 overs; target was 126 runs.

=== Quarter-finals ===
15 November 2021
Scorecard

Maharashtra; 120/9 (33 overs)	v	Punjab; 122/5 (29.3 overs)
Mukta Magre 38 (63); Kanika Ahuja 5/23 (7 overs)		Taniya Bhatia 39* (51); Priyanka Garkhede 2/15 (7 overs)

Punjab won by 5 wickets
Three Ovals KSCA Stadium, Bangalore
Umpires: Nikhil Menon and Pralhad Singh Rawat

- Punjab won the toss and elected to field.
- Match reduced to 33 overs per side due to rain.

15 November 2021
Scorecard

Railways; 271/9 (50 overs)	v	Odisha; 122/7 (50 overs)
Sabbhineni Meghana 90 (101); Priyanka Priyadarshini 3/56 (10 overs)		Sushree Dibyadarshini 44 (79); Meghna Singh 2/20 (7 overs)

Railways won by 149 runs
Three Ovals KSCA Stadium, Bangalore
Umpires: Dharmesh Kumar Bhardwaj and Prem

- Railways won the toss and elected to bat.

16 November 2021
Scorecard

Delhi; 185/5 (50 overs)	v	Bengal; 189/9 (49.1 overs)
Priya Punia 90 (148); Rumeli Dhar 2/29 (9 overs)		Dhara Gujjar 75 (120); Simran Bahadur 2/17 (10 overs)

Bengal won by 1 wicket
Three Ovals KSCA Stadium, Bangalore
Umpires: Nikhil Menon and Ganesh Charhate

- Bengal won the toss and elected to field.

16 November 2021
Scorecard

Madhya Pradesh; 169/9 (48 overs)	v	Karnataka; 170/5 (42.2 overs)
Soumya Tiwari 45 (73); Chandu Venkateshappa 2/25 (10 overs)		Kumar Prathyoosha 45* (58); Anushka Sharma 2/34 (10 overs)

Karnataka won by 5 wickets
Three Ovals KSCA Stadium, Bangalore
Umpires: Amit Bansal and Prem

- Karnataka won the toss and elected to field.
- Match reduced to 48 overs per side due to rain.

=== Semi-finals ===
18 November 2021
Scorecard

Punjab	v	Karnataka

Match Abandoned
Three Ovals KSCA Stadium, Bangalore
Umpires: Amit Bansal and Pralhad Singh Rawat

- No toss.
- No play possible due to rain.
- Karnataka progressed to the final by virtue of a better group stage record.

18 November 2021
Scorecard

Railways	v	Bengal

Match Abandoned
M. Chinnaswamy Stadium, Bangalore
Umpires: Nikhil Menon and Ganesh Charhate

- No toss.
- No play possible due to rain.
- Railways progressed to the final by virtue of a better group stage record.

=== Final ===
20 November 2021
Scorecard

Karnataka; 74 (38 overs)	v	Railways; 76/2 (22.2 overs)
Niki Prasad 21 (72); Renuka Singh 4/14 (7 overs)		Sabbhineni Meghana 36 (43); Shreyanka Patil 1/15 (4.2 overs)

Railways won by 8 wickets
M. Chinnaswamy Stadium, Bangalore
Umpires: Dharmesh Kumar Bhardwaj and Amit Bansal

- Railways won the toss and elected to field.

== Statistics ==
=== Most runs ===
Player	Team	Matches	Innings	Runs	Average	HS	100s	50s
Sabbhineni Meghana	Railways	6	6	388	64.66	142	1	2
Muskan Malik	Uttar Pradesh	6	6	364	72.80	113	3	0
Madhuri Mehta	Odisha	7	7	364	60.66	108*	1	2
Dhara Gujjar	Bengal	6	6	355	71.00	115	1	2
Dinesh Vrinda	Karnataka	6	6	348	87.00	104	2	2

Source: CricketArchive

=== Most wickets ===
Player	Team	Overs	Wickets	Average	BBI	5w
Rashi Kanojiya	Uttar Pradesh	54.5	15	12.40	4/17	0
Kanika Ahuja	Punjab	47.0	15	13.13	5/23	1
Sandhya Sayal	Jammu and Kashmir	55.4	14	6.92	6/9	1
Venkateshappa Chandu	Karnataka	53.2	14	11.64	5/17	1
Parunika Sisodia	Delhi	56.3	14	13.78	5/26	1

Source: CricketArchive
