= 2012–13 Senior Women's One Day League =

- Dates: 4 – 24 November 2012
- Administrator(s): BCCI
- Cricket format: List A
- Tournament format(s): Round-robin and final
- Champions: Railways (6th title)
- Runners-up: Uttar Pradesh
- Participants: 26
- Matches: 76
- Most runs: Punam Raut (408)
- Most wickets: Diana David (23)

The 2012–13 Senior Women's One Day League was the 7th edition of the women's List A cricket competition in India. It took place in November 2012, with 26 teams divided into five regional groups. Railways won the tournament, their sixth, beating Uttar Pradesh in the final.

== Competition format ==
The 26 teams competing in the tournament were divided into five zonal groups: Central, East, North, South and West. The tournament operated on a round-robin format, with each team playing every other team in their group once. The top two sides from each group progressed to the Super League round, where the 10 remaining teams were divided into two further round-robin groups. The winner of each group progressed to the final. Matches were played using a 50 over format.

The groups worked on a points system, with positions within the groups based on the total points. Points were awarded as follows:

Win: 4 points.
Tie: 2 points.
Loss: –1 points.
No Result/Abandoned: 2 points.
Bonus Points: 1 point available per match.
Consolation Points: 1 point available per match.

If points in the final table are equal, teams are separated by most wins, then head-to-head record, then number of Bonus Points, then Net Run Rate.

== Zonal Tables ==
=== Central Zone ===
Team	P	W	L	T	NR	BP	CP	Pts	NRR
Railways (Q)	4	4	0	0	0	4	0	20	+1.903
Uttar Pradesh (Q)	4	3	1	0	0	2	0	13	+0.328
Vidarbha	4	1	3	0	0	1	1	3	–0.267
Rajasthan	4	1	3	0	0	1	0	2	–1.075
Madhya Pradesh	4	1	3	0	0	0	1	2	–0.773

=== East Zone ===
Team	P	W	L	T	NR	BP	CP	Pts	NRR
Assam (Q)	4	4	0	0	0	2	0	18	+0.733
Tripura (Q)	4	3	1	0	0	1	0	12	+0.397
Bengal	4	2	2	0	0	2	1	9	–0.149
Odisha	4	1	3	0	0	1	2	4	–0.069
Jharkhand	4	0	4	0	0	0	1	–3	–0.903

=== North Zone ===
Team	P	W	L	T	NR	BP	CP	Pts	NRR
Punjab (Q)	4	4	0	0	0	2	0	18	+1.887
Delhi (Q)	4	2	2	0	0	2	2	10	+0.820
Haryana	4	2	2	0	0	1	2	9	+0.715
Himachal Pradesh	4	2	2	0	0	1	0	7	–0.553
Jammu and Kashmir	4	0	4	0	0	0	0	–4	–3.039

=== South Zone ===
Team	P	W	L	T	NR	BP	CP	Pts	NRR
Hyderabad (Q)	5	5	0	0	0	4	0	24	+1.742
Tamil Nadu (Q)	5	4	1	0	0	3	1	19	+1.053
Kerala	5	3	2	0	0	0	1	11	–0.523
Goa	5	2	3	0	0	0	1	6	–0.642
Karnataka	5	1	4	0	0	0	2	2	–0.452
Andhra	5	0	5	0	0	0	3	–2	–1.174

=== West Zone ===
Team	P	W	L	T	NR	BP	CP	Pts	NRR
Maharashtra (Q)	4	4	0	0	0	3	0	19	+2.084
Mumbai (Q)	4	3	1	0	0	2	1	14	+0.691
Baroda	4	2	2	0	0	1	1	8	–0.300
Gujarat	4	1	3	0	0	1	1	3	–0.504
Saurashtra	4	0	4	0	0	0	0	–4	–1.620

Source:CricketArchive

== Super Leagues ==
=== Super League Group A ===
Team	P	W	L	T	NR	BP	CP	Pts	NRR
Uttar Pradesh (Q)	4	4	0	0	0	2	0	18	+0.715
Maharashtra	4	3	1	0	0	3	1	15	+0.946
Tamil Nadu	4	1	2	1	0	1	1	6	+0.266
Punjab	4	1	2	1	0	0	0	4	–0.640
Assam	4	0	4	0	0	0	1	–3	–1.257

=== Super League Group B ===
Team	P	W	L	T	NR	BP	CP	Pts	NRR
Railways (Q)	4	4	0	0	0	4	0	20	+2.084
Hyderabad	4	3	1	0	0	2	0	13	+0.245
Delhi	4	2	2	0	0	1	1	8	–0.038
Mumbai	4	1	3	0	0	0	1	2	–0.706
Tripura	4	0	4	0	0	0	1	–3	–1.488

Source:CricketArchive

== Final ==
24 November 2012
Scorecard

Railways; 185/7 (50 overs)	v	Uttar Pradesh; 95 (41.5 overs)
Punam Raut 63 (90); Preeti Dimri 2/30 (10 overs)		Nishu Choudhary 29 (35); Amita Sharma 2/12 (6 overs)

Railways won by 90 runs
Emerald High School Ground, Indore
Umpires: Manish Jain and Nikhil Menon

- Railways won the toss and elected to bat.

== Statistics ==
=== Most runs ===
Player	Team	Matches	Innings	Runs	Average	HS	100s	50s
Punam Raut	Railways	9	8	408	102.00	98*	0	4
Thirush Kamini	Tamil Nadu	9	9	388	48.50	89	0	3
Latika Kumari	Delhi	8	8	360	51.42	103	1	2
Reema Malhotra	Assam	8	7	345	115.00	74*	0	4
Harmanpreet Kaur	Punjab	8	8	331	47.28	93	0	3

Source: CricketArchive

=== Most wickets ===
Player	Team	Overs	Wickets	Average	BBI	5w
Diana David	Hyderabad	81.5	23	9.47	6/36	2
Anuja Patil	Maharashtra	79.3	20	11.05	6/27	1
Gouher Sultana	Railways	90.4	19	7.52	4/12	0
Ekta Bisht	Uttar Pradesh	94.3	18	15.27	4/22	0
Mehak Kesar	Punjab	54.0	17	12.23	4/6	0

Source: CricketArchive
