= 2015–16 Senior Women's One Day League =

- Dates: 15 November – 5 December 2015
- Administrator: BCCI
- Cricket format: List A
- Tournament format: Round-robin
- Champions: Railways (9th title)
- Runners-up: Mumbai
- Participants: 26
- Matches: 66
- Most runs: Mithali Raj (264)
- Most wickets: Ekta Bisht (15); Nancy Patel (15)

The 2015–16 Senior Women's One Day League was the 10th edition of the women's List A cricket competition in India. It took place from 15 November to 5 December 2015, with 26 teams divided into an Elite Group and a Plate Group. Railways won the tournament, their fourth in a row and ninth overall, by topping the Elite Group Super League.

== Competition format ==
The 26 teams competing in the tournament were divided into the Elite Group and the Plate Group, with the 10 teams in the Elite Group further divided into Groups A and B and the 16 teams in the Plate Group into Groups A, B and C. The tournament operated on a round-robin format, with each team playing every other team in their group once. The top two sides from each Elite Group progressed to the Elite Group Super League, which was a further round-robin group, with the winner of the group being crowned Champions. The bottom side from each Elite Group was relegated to the Plate Group for the following season. Meanwhile, the top two from each Plate Group progressed to a knockout stage, with the two teams that reached the final being promoted for the following season, as well as playing off for the Plate Group title. Matches were played using a 50 over format.

The groups worked on a points system, with positions within the groups based on the total points of each. Points were awarded as follows:

Win: 4 points.
Tie: 2 points.
Loss: 0 points.
No Result/Abandoned: 2 points.

If points in the final table were equal, teams were separated first by most wins, then by head-to-head record, then Net Run Rate.

== Elite Group ==
=== Elite Group A ===
Team	P	W	L	T	NR	Pts	NRR
Railways (Q)	4	4	0	0	0	16	+2.262
Mumbai (Q)	4	2	2	0	0	8	–0.283
Punjab	4	2	2	0	0	8	–0.614
Andhra	4	1	3	0	0	4	–0.291
Odisha (R)	4	1	3	0	0	4	–1.043

=== Elite Group B ===
Team	P	W	L	T	NR	Pts	NRR
Maharashtra (Q)	4	3	1	0	0	12	+0.724
Hyderabad (Q)	4	3	1	0	0	12	+0.338
Delhi	4	2	2	0	0	8	–0.398
Goa	4	1	3	0	0	4	–0.184
Bengal (R)	4	1	3	0	0	4	–0.241

=== Elite Group Super League ===
Team	P	W	L	T	NR	Pts	NRR
Railways (C)	3	3	0	0	0	12	+1.486
Mumbai	3	1	2	0	0	4	–0.077
Maharashtra	3	1	2	0	0	4	–0.426
Hyderabad	3	1	2	0	0	4	–0.775

== Plate Group ==
=== Plate Group A ===
Team	P	W	L	T	NR	Pts	NRR
Karnataka (Q)	5	5	0	0	0	20	+0.304
Madhya Pradesh (Q)	5	4	1	0	0	16	+0.655
Assam	5	2	3	0	0	8	+0.147
Jharkhand	5	2	3	0	0	8	–0.015
Uttar Pradesh	5	2	3	0	0	8	–0.047
Saurashtra	5	0	5	0	0	0	–0.991

=== Plate Group B ===
Team	P	W	L	T	NR	Pts	NRR
Haryana (Q)	4	3	1	0	0	12	+0.985
Himachal Pradesh (Q)	4	3	1	0	0	12	+0.875
Gujarat	4	3	1	0	0	12	+0.563
Tripura	4	1	3	0	0	4	–0.665
Jammu and Kashmir	4	0	4	0	0	0	–1.904

=== Plate Group C ===
Team	P	W	L	T	NR	Pts	NRR
Kerala (Q)	4	3	1	0	0	12	+1.121
Baroda (Q)	4	3	1	0	0	12	+0.767
Tamil Nadu	4	3	1	0	0	12	–0.304
Vidarbha	4	1	3	0	0	4	–0.848
Rajasthan	4	0	4	0	0	0	–1.009

Advanced to Plate Group Semi-finals Advanced to Plate Group Quarter-finals

=== Knockout stage ===
Quarter-finals
A2	Madhya Pradesh	128/8
B1	Haryana	75
B2	Himachal Pradesh	91
C2	Baroda	94/2

Semi-finals
C1	Kerala	74
A2	Madhya Pradesh	75/5
A1	Karnataka	104
C2	Baroda	105/6

Final
C2	Baroda	112
A2	Madhya Pradesh	113/5

==== Quarter-finals ====
1 December 2015
Scorecard

Madhya Pradesh; 128/8 (50 overs)	v	Haryana; 75 (43.4 overs)
Nuzhat Parween 28 (71); Suman Gulia 2/13 (4 overs)		Mansi Joshi 19 (54); Mamta Sharma 4/11 (9 overs)

Madhya Pradesh won by 53 runs
Santosh Garj Cricket Stadium, Una
Umpires: Vaibhav Dhokre and Parashar Joshi

- Haryana won the toss and elected to field.

1 December 2015
Scorecard

Himachal Pradesh; 91 (40.4 overs)	v	Baroda; 94/2 (22.2 overs)
Neena Choudhary 50 (113); Jaya Mohite 3/23 (10 overs)		Palak Patel 43* (69); Tanuja Kanwar 2/39 (10 overs)

Baroda won by 8 wickets
Indira Gandhi Stadium, Una
Umpires: Milind Bhatt and Sandeep Chavan

- Baroda won the toss and elected to field.

==== Semi-finals ====
3 December 2015
Scorecard

Karnataka; 104 (41.3 overs)	v	Baroda; 105/6 (44.3 overs)
Challuru Prathyusha 35* (72); Zulekha Yakubwala 3/25 (10 overs)		Yastika Bhatia 26 (88); Sahana Pawar 2/5 (10 overs)

Baroda won by 4 wickets
Indira Gandhi Stadium, Una
Umpires: Vaibhav Dhokre and Sandeep Chavan

- Baroda won the toss and elected to field.

3 December 2015
Scorecard

Kerala; 74 (42.4 overs)	v	Madhya Pradesh; 75/5 (31.5 overs)
Jincy George 23* (64); Pooja Vastrakar 4/12 (10 overs)		Varsha Choudhary 26* (84); Aswanthy Mol 2/17 (7 overs)

Madhya Pradesh won by 5 wickets
Santosh Garj Cricket Stadium, Una
Umpires: Milind Bhatt and Parashar Joshi

- Madhya Pradesh won the toss and elected to field.

==== Final ====
5 December 2015
Scorecard

Baroda; 112 (49.5 overs)	v	Madhya Pradesh; 113/5 (37.3 overs)
Heena Patel 43 (110); Nidhi Buley 3/14 (8.5 overs)		Pallavi Bharadwaj 23 (41); Gayatri Naik 2/20 (8 overs)

Madhya Pradesh won by 5 wickets
Indira Gandhi Stadium, Una
Umpires: Milind Bhatt and Sandeep Chavan

- Madhya Pradesh won the toss and elected to field.
- Madhya Pradesh and Baroda are promoted to the Elite Group.

== Statistics ==
=== Most runs ===
Player	Team	Matches	Innings	Runs	Average	HS	100s	50s
Mithali Raj	Railways	7	6	264	88.00	72*	0	3
Thirush Kamini	Railways	7	7	232	46.40	96	0	2
Varsha Choudhary	Madhya Pradesh	8	8	228	38.00	60	0	1
Mamatha Kanojia	Assam	5	5	193	64.33	56*	0	3
Smriti Mandhana	Maharashtra	4	4	193	64.33	84*	0	2

Source: CricketArchive

=== Most wickets ===
Player	Team	Overs	Wickets	Average	BBI	5w
Ekta Bisht	Railways	53.3	15	5.73	4/5	0
Nancy Patel	Baroda	63.3	15	7.93	4/10	0
Nidhi Buley	Madhya Pradesh	65.1	14	10.07	3/14	0
Kavita Patil	Railways	58.1	13	9.61	3/15	0
Sneh Rana	Railways	64.0	13	10.92	4/20	0

Source: CricketArchive
