= 2011–12 Senior Women's One Day League =

- Dates: 4 – 24 November 2011
- Administrator(s): BCCI
- Cricket format: List A
- Tournament format(s): Round-robin and final
- Champions: Delhi (1st title)
- Runners-up: Hyderabad
- Participants: 26
- Matches: 76
- Most runs: Anagha Deshpande (501)
- Most wickets: Reema Malhotra (18)

The 2011–12 Senior Women's One Day League was the 6th edition of the women's List A cricket competition in India. It took place in November 2011, with 26 teams divided into five regional groups. Delhi won the tournament, their first title, beating Hyderabad in the final. This was the first time since the launch of the tournament that a team other than Railways won the title.

== Competition format ==
The 26 teams competing in the tournament were divided into five zonal groups: Central, East, North, South and West. The tournament operated on a round-robin format, with each team playing every other team in their group once. The top two sides from each group progressed to the Super League round, where the 10 remaining teams were divided into two further round-robin groups. The winner of each group progressed to the final. Matches were played using a 50 over format.

The groups worked on a points system with positions with the groups being based on the total points. Points were awarded as follows:

Win: 4 points.
Tie: 2 points.
Loss: –1 points.
No Result/Abandoned: 2 points.
Bonus Points: 1 point available per match.
Consolation Points: 1 point available per match.

If points in the final table are equal, teams are separated by most wins, then head-to-head record, then number of Bonus Points, then Net Run Rate.

== Zonal tables ==
=== Central Zone ===
Team	P	W	L	T	NR	BP	CP	Pts	NRR
Railways (Q)	4	4	0	0	0	4	0	20	+2.797
Uttar Pradesh (Q)	4	3	1	0	0	1	0	12	+0.028
Vidarbha	4	2	2	0	0	2	1	9	+0.052
Madhya Pradesh	4	1	3	0	0	1	1	3	–0.878
Rajasthan	4	0	4	0	0	0	0	–4	–1.959

=== East Zone ===
Team	P	W	L	T	NR	BP	CP	Pts	NRR
Bengal (Q)	4	4	0	0	0	4	0	20	+2.165
Odisha (Q)	4	2	2	0	0	2	1	9	+0.252
Tripura	4	2	2	0	0	1	0	7	–0.191
Jharkhand	4	2	2	0	0	1	0	7	–0.250
Assam	4	0	4	0	0	0	1	–3	–1.631

=== North Zone ===
Team	P	W	L	T	NR	BP	CP	Pts	NRR
Delhi (Q)	4	4	0	0	0	3	0	18	+1.311
Punjab (Q)	4	2	2	0	0	2	1	9	+1.013
Himachal Pradesh	4	2	2	0	0	2	0	8	+0.351
Haryana	4	2	2	0	0	2	0	8	–0.243
Jammu and Kashmir	4	0	4	0	0	0	0	–4	–2.395

=== South Zone ===
Team	P	W	L	T	NR	BP	CP	Pts	NRR
Hyderabad (Q)	5	5	0	0	0	5	0	25	+1.525
Goa (Q)	5	3	2	0	0	3	0	13	+0.458
Karnataka	5	3	2	0	0	2	0	12	+0.181
Tamil Nadu	5	2	3	0	0	2	0	7	–0.276
Andhra	5	2	3	0	0	1	1	7	–0.355
Kerala	5	0	5	0	0	0	1	–4	–1.436

=== West Zone ===
Team	P	W	L	T	NR	BP	CP	Pts	NRR
Maharashtra (Q)	4	4	0	0	0	4	0	20	+2.860
Mumbai (Q)	4	3	1	0	0	2	0	13	+0.100
Saurashtra	4	2	2	0	0	0	0	6	–1.179
Baroda	4	1	3	0	0	0	1	2	–0.570
Gujarat	4	0	4	0	0	0	3	–1	–0.969

Source:CricketArchive

== Super Leagues ==
=== Super League Group A ===
Team	P	W	L	T	NR	BP	CP	Pts	NRR
Hyderabad (Q)	4	4	0	0	0	1	0	17	+1.024
Railways	4	3	1	0	0	2	1	14	+1.443
Mumbai	4	2	2	0	0	0	0	6	–1.310
Bengal	4	1	3	0	0	0	3	4	–0.182
Punjab	4	0	4	0	0	0	3	–1	–0.982

=== Super League Group B ===
Team	P	W	L	T	NR	BP	CP	Pts	NRR
Delhi (Q)	4	4	0	0	0	3	0	19	+1.280
Maharashtra	4	3	1	0	0	2	1	14	+0.705
Uttar Pradesh	4	2	2	0	0	2	0	8	+0.580
Goa	4	1	3	0	0	0	0	1	–1.675
Odisha	4	0	4	0	0	0	2	–2	–0.840

Source:CricketArchive

== Final ==
24 November 2011
Scorecard

Hyderabad; 206/8 (50 overs)	v	Delhi; 207/3 (49.3 overs)
Nidhi Torvi 58 (91); Deepti Dhyani 2/36 (10 overs)		Latika Kumari 78 (106); Nidhi Torvi 1/2 (2 overs)

Delhi won by 7 wickets
Deccan Gymkhana Ground, Pune
Umpires: Keki Doodhwala and Nitin Menon

- Hyderabad won the toss and elected to bat.

== Statistics ==
=== Most runs ===
Player	Team	Matches	Innings	Runs	Average	HS	100s	50s
Anagha Deshpande	Maharashtra	8	8	501	100.20	138*	1	5
Mamatha Kanojia	Hyderabad	10	10	413	59.00	109*	1	3
Jaya Sharma	Delhi	9	9	358	44.75	78	0	4
Smriti Mandhana	Maharashtra	8	8	336	42.00	155	1	1
Mithali Raj	Railways	8	5	325	162.50	98*	0	4

Source: CricketArchive

=== Most wickets ===
Player	Team	Overs	Wickets	Average	BBI	5w
Reema Malhotra	Delhi	74.0	18	13.72	4/23	0
Neha Maji	Bengal	64.4	17	9.17	4/16	0
Gouher Sultana	Railways	93.2	17	12.58	3/12	0
Sravanthi Naidu	Hyderabad	84.0	17	12.58	3/12	0
Rupali Chavan	Goa	79.0	15	15.46	2/9	0

Source: CricketArchive
