= 2006–07 Senior Women's One Day League =

- Dates: 27 November 2006 – 11 January 2007
- Administrator: BCCI
- Cricket format: List A
- Tournament format(s): Round-robin and knockouts
- Champions: Railways (1st title)
- Runners-up: Maharashtra
- Participants: 24
- Matches: 57
- Most runs: Amrita Shinde (374)
- Most wickets: Devika Palshikar (16)

The 2006–07 Senior Women's One Day League was the inaugural edition of the women's List A cricket competition in India. It took place between November 2006 and January 2007, with 24 teams divided into five regional groups. Railways won the tournament, beating Maharashtra in the final.

== Competition format ==
The 24 teams competing in the tournament were divided into five zonal groups: Central, East, North, South and West. The tournament operated on a round-robin format, with each team playing every other team in their group once. The top two sides from each group progressed to the knockout stages. Matches were played using a 50 over format.

The groups worked on a points system with positions in the groups based on the total points. Points were awarded as follows:

Win: 4 points.
Tie: 2 points.
Loss: –1 points.
No result/abandoned: 2 points.
Bonus points: 1 point available per match.
Consolation points: 1 point available per match.

If points in the final table were equal, teams were separated by most wins, then head-to-head record, then number of bonus points, then net run rate.

== Zonal tables ==
=== Central zone ===
Team	P	W	L	T	NR	BP	CP	Pts	NRR
Railways (Q)	4	4	0	0	0	4	0	20	+3.843
Madhya Pradesh (Q)	4	3	1	0	0	2	0	13	+0.782
Uttar Pradesh	4	2	2	0	0	2	1	9	+0.919
Vidarbha	4	1	3	0	0	1	0	2	–2.206
Rajasthan	4	0	4	0	0	0	0	–4	–3.863

=== East zone ===
Team	P	W	L	T	NR	BP	CP	Pts	NRR
Jharkhand (Q)	2	2	0	0	0	2	0	10	+3.738
Orissa (Q)	2	1	1	0	0	1	0	4	+0.310
Assam	2	0	2	0	0	0	0	–2	–2.372

=== North zone ===
Team	P	W	L	T	NR	BP	CP	Pts	NRR
Punjab (Q)	4	2	0	0	2	2	0	14	+1.699
Delhi (Q)	4	3	1	0	0	3	0	14	+2.142
Jammu and Kashmir	4	1	1	0	2	1	0	8	–0.716
Haryana	4	1	2	0	1	1	0	5	–1.497
Himachal Pradesh	4	0	3	0	1	0	0	–1	–2.342

=== South zone ===
Team	P	W	L	T	NR	BP	CP	Pts	NRR
Karnataka (Q)	5	5	0	0	0	4	0	24	+1.986
Hyderabad (Q)	5	4	1	0	0	4	1	20	+2.154
Tamil Nadu	5	3	2	0	0	3	0	13	+2.153
Kerala	5	2	3	0	0	2	0	7	–0.107
Andhra	5	1	4	0	0	1	0	1	–0.834
Goa	5	0	5	0	0	0	0	–5	–4.743

=== West zone ===
Team	P	W	L	T	NR	BP	CP	Pts	NRR
Maharashtra(Q)	4	4	0	0	0	3	0	19	+2.875
Mumbai (Q)	4	3	1	0	0	3	1	15	+3.709
Gujarat	4	2	2	0	0	1	0	7	–0.710
Baroda	4	1	3	0	0	0	0	1	–3.444
Saurashtra	4	0	4	0	0	0	2	–2	–2.329

Advanced to Quarter-Finals.
Advanced to Pre-Quarter-Finals.

Source:CricketArchive

== Knockout stage ==
Pre-Quarter-finals
C1	Madhya Pradesh	247/5
E2	Orissa	72/7
S2	Hyderabad	156/8
N2	Delhi	160/4

Quarter-finals
W1	Maharashtra	214/7
C2	Madhya Pradesh	176
N1	Punjab	179/9
S1	Karnataka	180/3
C1	Railways	251/5
N2	Delhi	115
W2	Mumbai	178/7
E1	Jharkhand	170

Semi-finals
W1	Maharashtra	221/8
S1	Karnataka	197/8
W2	Mumbai	133
C1	Railways	135/3

Final
W1	Maharashtra	104
C1	Railways	105/3

=== Pre-Quarter-finals ===
5 January 2007
Scorecard

Madhya Pradesh; 247/5 (50 overs)	v	Orissa; 72/7 (50 overs)
Babita Mandlik 87* (75); Madhusmita Behera 2/22 (10 overs)		Chinmayee Das 22 (74); Revati Joshi 2/6 (8 overs)

Madhya Pradesh won by 175 runs
Sardar Patel Stadium, Ahmedabad
Umpires: Mahendra Pandya and Bharat Patel

- Madhya Pradesh won the toss and elected to bat.

5 January 2007
Scorecard

Hyderabad; 156/8 (50 overs)	v	Delhi; 160/4 (45 overs)
Diana David 46 (77); Shilpa Gupta 3/28 (10 overs)		Anjum Chopra 64 (104); Savita Nirala 1/25 (8 overs)

Delhi won by 6 wickets
Sardar Patel Stadium, Ahmedabad
Umpires: Chetan Mankad and SN Rajput

- Delhi won the toss and elected to field.

=== Quarter-finals ===
6 January 2007
Scorecard

Punjab; 179/9 (50 overs)	v	Karnataka; 180/3 (44.2 overs)
Gurdeep Minhas 55 (85); Deepika Babu 2/21 (10 overs)		Deepika Babu 50* (77); Avneet Kaur 2/29 (10 overs)

Karnataka won by 7 wickets
Sardar Patel Stadium, Ahmedabad
Umpires: I Chhipa and Jitesh Desai

- Karnataka won the toss and elected to field.

6 January 2007
Scorecard

Mumbai; 178/7 (50 overs)	v	Jharkhand; 170 (49.1 overs)
Punam Raut 97 (131); Seema Desai 3/26 (10 overs)		Kavita Roy 41 (83); Sunetra Paranjpe 2/25 (8 overs)

Mumbai won by 8 runs
Sardar Patel Stadium, Ahmedabad
Umpires: J Patel and Dinesh Vaghela

- Jharkhand won the toss and elected to field.

7 January 2007
Scorecard

Maharashtra; 214/7 (50 overs)	v	Madhya Pradesh; 176 (47.2 overs)
Amrita Shinde 85 (134); Ranju Gupta 3/51 (8 overs)		Babita Mandlik 87* (124); Devika Palshikar 3/48 (10 overs)

Maharashtra won by 38 runs
Sardar Patel Stadium, Ahmedabad
Umpires: Bharat Patel and Sunil Shah

- Maharashtra won the toss and elected to bat.

7 January 2007
Scorecard

Railways; 251/5 (50 overs)	v	Delhi; 115 (49.1 overs)
Sulakshana Naik 110 (136); Sunita Chhillar 1/33 (8 overs)		Deepti Dhyani 40 (75); Preeti Dimri 3/20 (10 overs)

Railways won by 136 runs
Sardar Patel Stadium, Ahmedabad
Umpires: M Patil and N Sharmili

- Railways won the toss and elected to bat.

=== Semi-finals ===
9 January 2007
Scorecard

Maharashtra; 221/8 (50 overs)	v	Karnataka; 197/8 (50 overs)
Trupti Khot 43* (38); Sunitha Vasudevan 2/37 (10 overs)		Karu Jain 96 (142); Soniya Dabir 3/39 (10 overs)

Maharashtra won by 24 runs
Sardar Patel Stadium, Ahmedabad
Umpires: Sunil Shah and Dinesh Vaghela

- Maharashtra won the toss and elected to bat.

9 January 2007
Scorecard

Mumbai; 133 (50 overs)	v	Railways; 135/3 (39 overs)
Raju Goyal 46* (80); Rumeli Dhar 4/13 (10 overs)		Mithali Raj 67* (92); Vrushali Sawant 2/20 (5 overs)

Railways won by 7 wickets
Sardar Patel Stadium, Ahmedabad
Umpires: Jitesh Desai and Mahendra Pandya

- Mumbai won the toss and elected to bat.

=== Final ===
11 January 2007
Scorecard

Maharashtra; 104 (42.1 overs)	v	Railways; 105/3 (29.3 overs)
Amrita Shinde 25 (52); Neetu David 2/8 (5 overs)		Sulakshana Naik 45 (85); Devika Palshikar 2/23 (8 overs)

Railways won by 7 wickets
Sardar Patel Stadium, Ahmedabad
Umpires: Jitesh Desai and Mahendra Pandya

- Maharashtra won the toss and elected to bat.

== Statistics ==
=== Most runs ===
Player	Team	Matches	Innings	Runs	Average	HS	100s	50s
Amrita Shinde	Maharashtra	7	6	374	62.33	102	1	3
Sulakshana Naik	Railways	7	6	351	58.50	110	2	1
Punam Raut	Mumbai	6	5	329	65.80	122	2	1
Karu Jain	Karnataka	6	6	326	65.20	96	0	3
Babita Mandlik	Madhya Pradesh	6	6	260	86.66	87*	0	2

Source: CricketArchive

=== Most wickets ===
Player	Team	Overs	Wickets	Average	BBI	5w
Devika Palshikar	Maharashtra	57.5	16	12.18	6/8	1
Rumeli Dhar	Railways	48.0	13	7.07	4/13	0
Thirush Kamini	Tamil Nadu	38.1	12	9.08	3/10	0
Amita Sharma	Railways	42.0	12	10.50	4/14	0
Deepika Babu	Karnataka	43.4	12	12.16	3/34	0

Source: CricketArchive
