= 2016–17 Senior Women's One Day League =

- Dates: 1 – 19 October 2016
- Administrator: BCCI
- Cricket format: List A
- Tournament format: Round-robin
- Champions: Railways (10th title)
- Runners-up: Maharashtra
- Participants: 27
- Most runs: Neena Choudhary (348)
- Most wickets: Tanuja Kanwar (17)

The 2016–17 Senior Women's One Day League was the 11th edition of the women's List A cricket competition in India. It took place in October 2016, with 27 teams divided into an Elite Group and a Plate Group. Railways won the tournament by topping the Elite Group Super League, whilst Himachal Pradesh and Uttar Pradesh were promoted from the Plate Group. Railways won the tournament, their fifth in a row and 10th overall.

== Competition format ==
The 27 teams competing in the tournament were divided into the Elite Group and the Plate Group, with the 10 teams in the Elite Group further divided into Groups A and B and the 17 teams in the Plate Group into Groups A, B and C. The tournament operated on a round-robin format, with each team playing every other team in their group once. The top two sides from each Elite Group progressed to the Elite Group Super League, which was a further round-robin group, with the winner of the group being crowned Champions. The bottom side from each Elite Group was relegated to the Plate Group for the following season. Meanwhile, the top two from each Plate Group progressed to a knockout stage, with the two teams that reached the final being promoted for the following season, as well as playing off for the Plate Group title. Matches were played using a 50 over format.

The groups worked on a points system with positions with the groups being based on the total points. Points were awarded as follows:

Win: 4 points.
Tie: 2 points.
Loss: 0 points.
No Result/Abandoned: 2 points.

If points in the final table are equal, teams are separated by most wins, then head-to-head record, then Net Run Rate.

== Elite Group ==
=== Teams ===
Elite Group A	Elite Group B
Baroda	Andhra
Delhi	Madhya Pradesh
Goa	Mumbai
Hyderabad	Punjab
Maharashtra	Railways

=== Elite Group A ===
Position	Team	Matches	Won	Lost	NR	Pts	NRR
1	Maharashtra	4	4	0	0	16	+1.645
2	Delhi	4	2	2	0	8	+0.307
3	Baroda	4	2	2	0	8	–0.460
4	Hyderabad	4	1	2	1	6	+0.181
5	Goa	4	0	3	1	2	–1.825

Advanced to Super League Relegated to Plate Group

The Elite Group A comprised Maharashtra, Delhi, Baroda, Hyderabad and Goa. While Maharashtra won all four games of the league phase to qualify for the Super League, Delhi qualified on the basis of Net Run Rate after winning two of their four matches.

=== Elite Group B ===
Position	Team	Matches	Won	Lost	NR	Pts	NRR
1	Madhya Pradesh	4	2	0	2	12	+0.320
2	Railways	4	1	0	3	10	+1.820
3	Andhra	4	1	2	1	6	–0.231
4	Punjab	4	1	2	1	6	–0.614
5	Mumbai	4	0	1	3	6	–0.477

Advanced to Super League Relegated to Plate Group

The Elite Group B comprised Madhya Pradesh, Railways, Andhra, Punjab and Mumbai. Madhya Pradesh finished at the top of the table with two wins from four games, while Railways finished in second position. They won one match, with their other three matches ending in no result.

=== Elite Group Super League ===
Position	Team	Matches	Won	Lost	Pts	NRR
1	Railways	3	3	0	12	+2.232
2	Maharashtra	3	1	2	4	–0.284
3	Madhya Pradesh	3	1	2	4	–0.919
4	Delhi	3	1	2	4	–1.011

Railways emerged as champions of the 2016–17 Senior Women's One Day League. The Mithali Raj-led team won all their three matches in the Super League phase to finish at the top of the table and claim the title, while Maharashtra finished as runners-up.

==== Fixtures ====
15 October 2016
Scorecard

Railways; 170/6 (50 overs)	v	Maharashtra; 91 (39 overs)

Railways won by 79 runs
SGVR Andhra Cricket Association Stadium, Perecherla

15 October 2016
Scorecard

Madhya Pradesh; 151/8 (50 overs)	v	Delhi; 154/3 (42.4 overs)

Delhi won by 7 wickets
Jagarlamudi Kuppuswamy Choudary College, Guntur

16 October 2016
Scorecard

Maharashtra; 234/4 (50 overs)	v	Delhi; 194/7 (50 overs)

Maharashtra won by 40 runs
SGVR Andhra Cricket Association Stadium, Perecherla

16 October 2016
Scorecard

Madhya Pradesh; 71 (41.3 overs)	v	Railways; 75/0 (22.5 overs)

Railways won by 10 wickets
Jagarlamudi Kuppuswamy Choudary College, Guntur

18 October 2016
Scorecard

Railways; 265/3 (50 overs)	v	Delhi; 126 (43.2 overs)

Railways won by 139 runs
Jagarlamudi Kuppuswamy Choudary College, Guntur

18 October 2016
Scorecard

Maharashtra; 219/4 (50 overs)	v	Madhya Pradesh; 220/8 (49.2 overs)

Madhya Pradesh won by 2 wickets
SGVR Andhra Cricket Association Stadium, Perecherla

== Plate Group ==
=== Teams ===
Plate Group A	Plate Group B	Plate Group C
Gujarat	Bengal	Assam
Jammu and Kashmir	Odisha	Chhattisgarh
Jharkhand	Rajasthan	Haryana
Karnataka	Tamil Nadu	Himachal Pradesh
Kerala	Uttar Pradesh	Saurashtra
Vidarbha		Tripura

=== Plate Group A ===
Position	Team	Matches	Won	Lost	Pts	NRR
1	Kerala	5	4	1	16	0.554
2	Karnataka	4	3	1	12	0.785
3	Jharkhand	5	3	2	12	–0.174
4	Vidarbha	4	2	2	8	0.576
5	Gujarat	5	2	3	8	–0.288
6	J & K	5	0	5	0	–1.713

Advanced to Plate Group Semi-finals Advanced to Plate Group Quarter-finals

=== Plate Group B ===
Position	Team	Matches	Won	Lost	NR	A	Pts	NRR
1	Odisha	4	2	0	0	2	12	0.746
2	Uttar Pradesh	4	2	0	0	2	12	0.435
3	Bengal	4	1	1	1	1	8	0.045
4	Tamil Nadu	4	0	1	2	1	6	-0.220
5	Rajasthan	4	0	3	1	0	2	-0.801

Advanced to Plate Group Quarter-finals

=== Plate Group C ===
Position	Team	Matches	Won	Lost	NR	Pts	NRR
1	Himachal Pradesh	5	3	1	0	14	0.880
2	Haryana	5	3	1	1	14	0.469
3	Saurashtra	5	2	3	0	8	0.021
4	Tripura	5	2	3	0	8	–0.591
5	Assam	4	1	1	1	8	0.435
6	Chhattisgarh	4	1	3	0	4	–1.205

Advanced to Plate Group Semi-finals Advanced to Plate Group Quarter-finals

=== Knockout stage ===
==== Quarter-finals ====
15 October 2016
Scorecard

Uttar Pradesh; 154/8 (50 overs)	v	Haryana; 147 (49 overs)

Uttar Pradesh won by 7 runs
Moti Bagh Stadium, Vadodara

15 October 2016
Scorecard

Odisha; 143 (50 overs)	v	Karnataka; 144/4 (42.4 overs)

Karnataka won by 6 wickets
Reliance Cricket Stadium, Vadodara

==== Semi-finals ====
17 October 2016
Scorecard

Himachal Pradesh; 169/7 (50 overs)	v	Karnataka; 107 (41.2 overs)

Himachal Pradesh won by 62 runs
Railway Ground, Vadodara

17 October 2016
Scorecard

Kerala; 86 (47.3 overs)	v	Uttar Pradesh; 87/4 (30.4 overs)

Uttar Pradesh won by 6 wickets
Moti Bagh Stadium, Vadodara

==== Final ====
19 October 2016
Scorecard

Himachal Pradesh; 185/7 (50 overs)	v	Uttar Pradesh; 137 (47.5 overs)
Neena Choudhary 77 (124); Shefali Sahu 2/32 (10 overs)		Nishu Choudhary 39 (62); Tanuja Kanwar 3/26 (10 overs)

Himachal Pradesh won by 48 runs
Moti Bagh Stadium, Vadodara
Umpires: Anish Sahasrabudhe and Sandeep Chavan

- Himachal Pradesh won the toss and elected to bat.
- Himachal Pradesh and Uttar Pradesh are promoted to the Elite Group.

== Statistics ==
=== Most runs ===
Player	Team	Mat	Inns	Runs	Ave	SR	HS	100	50
Neena Choudhary	Himachal Pradesh	7	7	348	69.60	63.85	103*	1	2
Smriti Mandhana	Maharashtra	7	7	226	37.66	85.93	74	0	2
Mona Meshram	Vidarbha	5	5	225	56.25	58.29	71*	0	3
Vellaswamy Vanitha	Karnataka	7	6	214	35.66	96.83	70	0	2
Neha Tanwar	Delhi	5	5	201	67.00	59.11	74*	0	2

Source: CricketArchive

=== Most wickets ===
Player	Team	Balls	Wkts	Ave	Econ	BBI	SR	4WI	5WI
Tanuja Kanwar	Himachal Pradesh	408	17	7.82	1.95	4/13	24.00	2	0
Shivangiraj Singh	Uttar Pradesh	270	14	5.00	1.55	5/11	19.28	0	1
Ekta Bisht	Railways	227	13	5.15	1.77	3/1	17.46	0	0
Poonam Yadav	Railways	228	13	8.76	3.00	4/8	17.53	2	0
Sahana Pawar	Karnataka	358	13	9.92	2.16	4/10	27.53	1	0
Challuru Prathyusha	Karnataka	354	13	10.30	2.27	4/14	27.23	1	0

Source: CricketArchive
