= Daruwalla =

Daruwalla is a surname. Notable people with the surname include:

- Bejan Daruwalla (1931–2020), Indian English professor and astrology columnist
- Jehan Daruvala (born 1998), Indian Formula 2 driver
- Keki N. Daruwalla (born 1937), Indian poet and short story writer
- Nancy Daruwalla (born 1987), Indian cricketer
