= R. S. Saranya =

Indian cricketer

Saranya R. S. Is an Indian cricketer and a former captain of the Kerala women's cricket team. Currently serving as the head coach of the Meghalaya Senior Women's Cricket team, Saranya is the first woman cricketer to be a coach certified by the National Cricket Academy. She has also played for Karnataka women's cricket team.

== Career ==
After playing women's hockey at the Kerala state level, Saranya started her cricketing career in the mid-2000s. In the 2005–06 season, Saranya was selected in the Kerala women's cricket team, where she worked for a decade, including four years as skipper. She had her worst cricketing season in 2011–12. Saranya soon graduated to the position of a coach, after clearing Level-B in coaching, in 2012. She was selected as a coach in the women's Under-19 National Zonal camp, for the 2015–16 season. Two seasons later she was appointed as the head coach by Assam Cricket Association. Under her, the Assam Women's squad qualified for National cricket tournaments in all age groups. Saranya subsequently served as a spin bowling coach for the NCA Women Under 19 Elite group after which she accepted an offer from Meghalaya Cricket Association to be the head coach of the state's Senior Women's squad. Under her, the Meghalaya Women's squad led by Debasmita Dutta clinched the third place in the Senior Women's One-Day tournament held in Puducherry.
