= Senior Women's One-Day Trophy =

Women's List A cricket tournament in India

- Countries: India
- Administrator: BCCI
- Format: Limited overs cricket (50 overs per side)
- First edition: 2006–07
- Latest edition: 2025–26
- Next edition: 2026–27
- Tournament format: Round-robin and knockout
- Number of teams: 37
- Current champion: Delhi (2nd title)
- Most successful: Railways (15 titles)
- Website: BCCI

The Senior Women's One Day Trophy, previously known as the Senior Women's One Day League, is a women's List A cricket tournament held in India. It began in the 2006–07 season, with 24 teams representing state cricket associations, whilst the most recent season, 2023–24, had 37 teams competing. Railways have won the tournament 15 times, including the first and most recent season, whilst Delhi and Bengal have each won the tournament once.

== History ==
The tournament, as the Senior Women's One Day League, began in the 2006–07 season, the first competition involving state teams in India since the Senior National Women's Cricket Championship, a combined List A and first-class competition that ended in 2002–03. The first tournament was won by Railways, who beat Maharashtra by 7 wickets in the final.

Railways went on to dominate the competition, winning the first five competitions before their run was ended in 2011–12 by Delhi, who beat Hyderabad in the final. Railways regained their title the following season, however, starting another dominant run in which they won six titles in a row. In 2018–19, Bengal won their first title, beating Railways in the semi-final before defeating Andhra in the final.

Ahead of the 2019–20 season, the tournament was renamed the Women's Senior One Day Trophy. The season was eventually curtailed due to the COVID-19 pandemic, with the knockout stages cancelled and therefore no overall winner was declared. The tournament returned for 2020–21, with Railways again winning the title, their twelfth. They won their thirteenth title in 2021–22, beating Karnataka in the final. The same final was repeated in 2022–23, with Railways again winning the tournament. Railways won the tournament yet again in 2023–24, beating Uttarakhand in the final.

The tournament ran alongside a first-class state competition, the Inter State Women's Competition, in 2007–08 and 2008–09 and has run alongside the Senior Women's T20 League since 2008–09.

== Competition format ==
The Women's Senior One Day Trophy has used various formats across the years. In the first season, 2006–07, 24 state teams competed in round-robin groups across five zones, Central, East, North, South and West, with the top two from each group advancing to the knockout stages. For the following season, the number of teams in the competition expanded to 27, with the addition of Bengal, Sikkim and Tripura but retained the same format with slightly expanded groups.

In 2008–09, the number of teams expanded again, to 28, with the addition of Manipur. The format also changed, with the top two from each zonal group now advanced to a further group stage, with two "Super Leagues" of five teams apiece, with the winners of these leagues advancing to the final. The following season retained the same format, but was reduced to 26 teams, with the departure of Sikkim and Manipur. The format remained the same until the end of the 2012–13 season.

For the 2013–14 season, the 26 teams were arranged into an Elite Group and a Plate Group, then further divided into Elite Groups A and B and Plate Groups A, B and C. The top two from each Plate Group went into a knockout round, with the two finalists playing for the Plate Group title whilst also both gaining promotion to the Elite Group for the following season. Meanwhile, the top two from each Elite Group went into a Super League of four teams, with the winner being crowned the Champions of the tournament. The format was retained until the end of the 2017–18, with the only adjustment being for the addition of Chhattisgarh ahead of the 2016–17 season.

Ahead of the 2018–19 season, nine teams were added to the competition: newly added were Arunachal Pradesh, Bihar, Meghalaya, Mizoram, Nagaland, Pondicherry and Uttarakhand, as well as the returning Manipur and Sikkim. The format was also changed, with the 27 original teams competing in three Elite Groups, with eight progressing to knockout stages, and the 10 new teams competing in the Plate Group, with the winner being promoted to the Elite Group for the following season. The format was retained for the following season, 2019–20 (with the addition of Chandigarh), but the knockout stages were cancelled due to the COVID-19 pandemic.

Alterations to the format, partly due to COVID-19 protocols, for the 2020–21 season meant that three teams were promoted from the Plate Group from the previous season. The 30 teams in the Elite Group were then divided into 5 groups of 6, with a Plate Group of 7 teams. The winners and two best second-placed teams then went straight into the knockout stages, with the third best second-placed team playing off against the winner of the Plate Group for the final quarter-final spot. The format was slightly altered for the 2021–22 season, with the top two teams from each Elite Group proceeding to the knockout stages, along with the winner of the Plate Group. The winners of each Elite Group progressed straight to the quarter-finals, whilst the other six teams played off in the pre-quarter-finals. The format was again altered for the 2022–23, with all teams now divided into five groups, with group winners progressing directly to the quarter-finals, and the second-placed teams and the best third-placed teams progressing to the pre-quarter-finals. In 2023–24, the top two teams in each group progressed to the knockout stages.

Matches are played using a one day format with 50 overs per side. In the most recent edition of the tournament, teams received 4 points for a win, 2 for a tie, no result or abandonment, and 0 for a loss. Positions in the tables was determined firstly by points, then by wins, then by head-to-head record and finally by Net Run Rate.

== Teams ==
Team	First	Last	Titles	Runners-up
Andhra	2006–07	2023–24	0	1
Arunachal Pradesh	2018–19	2023–24	0	0
Assam	2006–07	2023–24	0	0
Baroda	2006–07	2023–24	0	0
Bengal	2007–08	2023–24	1	1
Bihar	2018–19	2023–24	0	0
Chandigarh	2019–20	2023–24	0	0
Chhattisgarh	2016–17	2023–24	0	0
Delhi	2006–07	2023–24	1	2
Goa	2006–07	2023–24	0	0
Gujarat	2006–07	2023–24	0	0
Haryana	2006–07	2023–24	0	0
Himachal Pradesh	2006–07	2023–24	0	0
Hyderabad	2006–07	2023–24	0	1
Jammu and Kashmir	2006–07	2023–24	0	0
Jharkhand	2006–07	2023–24	0	1
Karnataka	2006–07	2023–24	0	2
Kerala	2006–07	2023–24	0	0
Madhya Pradesh	2006–07	2023–24	1	0
Maharashtra	2006–07	2023–24	0	4
Manipur	2008–09	2023–24	0	0
Meghalaya	2018–19	2023–24	0	0
Mizoram	2018–19	2023–24	0	0
Mumbai	2006–07	2023–24	0	3
Nagaland	2018–19	2023–24	0	0
Odisha	2006–07	2023–24	0	1
Pondicherry	2018–19	2023–24	0	0
Punjab	2006–07	2023–24	0	0
Railways	2006–07	2023–24	15	0
Rajasthan	2006–07	2023–24	0	0
Saurashtra	2006–07	2023–24	0	0
Sikkim	2007–08	2023–24	0	0
Tamil Nadu	2006–07	2023–24	0	0
Tripura	2007–08	2023–24	0	0
Uttarakhand	2018–19	2023–24	0	1
Uttar Pradesh	2006–07	2023–24	0	1
Vidarbha	2006–07	2023–24	0	0

== Tournament Winners ==
Season	Winner	Runner up	Leading run-scorer	Leading wicket-taker	Refs
2006–07	Railways	Maharashtra	Amrita Shinde (Maharashtra) 374	Devika Palshikar (Maharashtra) 16	
2007–08	Railways	Maharashtra	Mithali Raj (Railways) 356	Raju Goyal (Mumbai) 17	
2008–09	Railways	Maharashtra	Mithali Raj (Railways) 433	Preeti Dimri (Railways) 25	
2009–10	Railways	Delhi	Thirush Kamini (Tamil Nadu) 489	Neetu David (Railways) 19	
2010–11	Railways	Mumbai	Karu Jain (Karnataka) 319	Priyanka Roy (Railways); Jhulan Goswami (Bengal) 21	
2011–12	Delhi	Hyderabad	Anagha Deshpande (Maharashtra) 501	Reema Malhotra (Delhi) 18	
2012–13	Railways	Uttar Pradesh	Punam Raut (Railways) 408	Diana David (Hyderabad) 23	
2013–14	Railways	Mumbai	Priyanka Roy (Bengal) 313	Sujata Mallik (Odisha); Anuja Patil (Maharashtra) 16	
2014–15	Railways	Odisha	Mithali Raj (Railways) 413	Challa Jhansi Lakshmi (Andhra) 17	
2015–16	Railways	Mumbai	Mithali Raj (Railways) 264	Ekta Bisht (Railways); Nancy Patel (Baroda) 15	
2016–17	Railways	Maharashtra	Neena Choudhary (Himachal Pradesh) 348	Tanuja Kanwar (Himachal Pradesh) 17	
2017–18	Railways	Delhi	Deepti Sharma (Bengal) 312	Shikha Pandey (Goa) 18	
2018–19	Bengal	Andhra	Deepti Sharma (Bengal) 487	Tarannum Pathan (Baroda) 24	
2019–20	Knockout stages cancelled due to the COVID-19 pandemic.				
2020–21	Railways	Jharkhand	Indrani Roy (Jharkhand) 456	Sneh Rana (Railways) 18	
2021–22	Railways	Karnataka	Sabbhineni Meghana (Railways) 388	Rashi Kanojiya (Uttar Pradesh); Kanika Ahuja (Punjab) 15	
2022–23	Railways	Karnataka	Jasia Akhtar (Rajasthan) 501	Parunika Sisodia (Delhi); Poonam Yadav (Railways) 21	
2023–24	Railways	Uttarakhand	Shweta Sehrawat (Delhi) 462	Priya Mishra (Delhi) 23	
2024–25	Madhya Pradesh	Bengal	Shafali Verma (Haryana) 527	Saranya Gadwal (Andhra) 21	
2025–26	Delhi	Railways	Priya Punia (Delhi) 670	Nazma (Delhi) 24	

=== Finals appearances by team ===
Team	Winner	Runner-up	Last Final
Railways	15	1	2025–26
Delhi	2	2	2025–26
Bengal	1	1	2024–25
Madhya Pradesh	1	0	2024–25
Maharashtra	0	4	2016–17
Mumbai	0	3	2015–16
Karnataka	0	2	2022–23
Hyderabad	0	1	2011–12
Uttar Pradesh	0	1	2012–13
Odisha	0	1	2014–15
Andhra	0	1	2018–19
Jharkhand	0	1	2020–21
Uttarakhand	0	1	2023–24
