= Uttarakhand women's cricket team =

Uttarakhand
- League: Senior Women's One-Day Trophy (LA); Senior Women's T20 Trophy (T20)
- Association: Cricket Association of Uttarakhand

Personnel
- Captain: Ekta Bisht
- Coach: Manish Jha

Team information
- Founded: 2018
- Home ground: Rajiv Gandhi International Cricket Stadium
- Capacity: 25,000

History
- List A debut: vs. Bihar, Ravenshaw University Ground 2, Cuttack; 2 December 2018
- Twenty20 debut: vs. Tripura, Police Training Academy Ground, Agartala; 21 February 2019
- Senior Women's One-Day Trophy wins: 0
- Senior Women's T20 Trophy wins: 0
- Official website: CAU
WLA/WT20 kit

The Uttarakhand women's cricket team is an Indian domestic cricket team representing the Indian state of Uttarakhand. The team has represented the state in Senior Women's One-Day Trophy (List A) and Senior Women's T20 Trophy (T20). They reached the finals of both tournaments in the 2023–24 season, but were the runners-up in both finals.

== Competitive record ==
Senior Women's One-Day Trophy (List A)
| Season | Group | Matches | Wins | Losses | Ties | No Result | Performance |
|---|---|---|---|---|---|---|---|
| 2018–19 | Plate Group | 9 | 7 | 2 | 0 | 0 | Quarter-finals |
| 2019–20 | Group C | 8 | 0 | 8 | 0 | 0 | Group Stage |
| 2020–21 | Group B | 5 | 1 | 4 | 0 | 0 | Group Stage |
| 2021–22 | Group B | 5 | 2 | 3 | 0 | 0 | Group Stage |
| 2022–23 | Group D | 8 | 6 | 2 | 0 | 0 | Semi-finals |
| 2023–24 | Group D | 9 | 8 | 1 | 0 | 0 | Final |
| 2024–25 | Group B | 8 | 5 | 3 | 0 | 0 | Pre quarter-finals |
| 2025–26 | Group B | 7 | 3 | 4 | 0 | 0 | Group Stage |
| 2026–27 | TBD | TBD | | | | | |
| Total | | 59 | 32 | 27 | 0 | 0 | Win %: 54.24 |

Senior Women's T20 Trophy (T20)
| Season | Group | Matches | Wins | Losses | Ties | No Result | Performance |
|---|---|---|---|---|---|---|---|
| 2018–19 | Group D | 6 | 1 | 4 | 0 | 1 | Group Stage |
| 2019–20 | Group D | 7 | 1 | 5 | 0 | 1 | Group Stage |
| 2020–21 | Season cancelled due to the COVID-19 pandemic | | | | | | |
| 2021–22 | Group D | 5 | 1 | 4 | 0 | 0 | Group Stage |
| 2022–23 | Group E | 6 | 2 | 3 | 0 | 1 | Group Stage |
| 2023–24 | Group D | 10 | 7 | 3 | 0 | 0 | Final |
| 2024–25 | Group B | 9 | 5 | 2 | 0 | 2 | Semi-finals |
| 2025–26 | Group D | 6 | 2 | 3 | 0 | 1 | Group Stage |
| 2026–27 | Group D | 6 | 4 | 2 | 0 | 0 | Group Stage |
| Total | | 55 | 23 | 26 | 0 | 6 | Win %: 41.82 |

== See also ==
- India women's national cricket team
- Uttarakhand cricket team
- Cricket Association of Uttarakhand
- Cricket in India
- Women's cricket
