= Ritika Bhopalkar =

Indian cricketer (born 1987)

Ritika Arun Bhopalkar (born 18 December 1987) is an Indian cricketer from Madhya Pradesh. She played for Mumbai, Madhya Pradesh, West Zone and Central Zone. She has played 65 limited-over matches and 30 Women's Twenty20s.
