= 2026–27 Senior Women's One Day Trophy =

2026–27 Women's Senior One Day Trophy
- Dates: 19 December 2026 – 10 January 2027
- Administrator: Board of Control for Cricket in India
- Cricket format: List A
- Tournament format(s): Round-robin and playoffs
- Host: India
- Participants: 37
- Matches: 128

The 2026–27 Women's Senior One Day Trophy will be the 20th edition of the Women's Senior One Day Trophy, a women's List A cricket competition in India. It will take place from 26 October to 20 November 2026 with 37 teams divided into five groups. The tournament formed part of the 2026–27 Indian domestic cricket season, announced by the Board of Control for Cricket in India (BCCI) in June 2026. Maharashtra, the defending champions.
