= 2025–26 Senior Women's One Day Trophy =

2025–26 Women's Senior One Day Trophy
- Dates: 6 February – 28 February 2026
- Administrator: Board of Control for Cricket in India
- Cricket format: List A
- Tournament format(s): Round-robin and playoffs
- Host: India
- Participants: 37
- Matches: 128

The 2025–26 Women's Senior One Day Trophy will be the 20th edition of the Women's Senior One Day Trophy, a women's List A cricket competition in India. It will take place from 6 February to 28 February 2026, with 37 teams divided into five groups. The tournament formed part of the 2025–26 Indian domestic cricket season, announced by the Board of Control for Cricket in India (BCCI) in June 2025. Madhya Pradesh were the defending champion.

== Fixtures ==
=== Group A ===
Pos	Team	Pld	W	L	T	D	NR	Pts	Quot	Qualification
1	Maharashtra	1	1	0	0	0	0	4	2.693	Advanced to the Knockout stage
2	Odisha	1	1	0	0	0	0	4	0.700	Advanced to the Knockout stage
3	Assam	1	1	0	0	0	0	4	0.640	
4	Uttar Pradesh	0	0	0	0	0	0	0	0.000	
5	bar	0	0	0	0	0	0	0	0.000	
6	Odisha	1	1	0	0	0	0	4	0.700	
7	Tamil Nadu	0	0	0	0	0	0	0	0.000	
8	Nagaland	0	0	0	0	0	0	0	0.000	

Updated to match(es) played on 6 February 2026. Source: BCCI
