= Nancy Daruwalla =

Indian cricketer (born 1987)

Personal information
- Full name: Nancy Rohinton Daruwalla
- Born: 31 August 1987; Thane, India

Domestic team information
- Years: Team
- 2006/07-2015/16: Mumbai Women
- Source: ESPNcricinfo, 10 April 2018

Nancy Rohinton Daruwalla (born 31 August 1987) is an Indian former cricketer. She played for Mumbai and West Zone. She has played 84 limited over and 31 Women's Twenty20 matches.
