= Punam Raut =

Indian cricketer (born 1989)

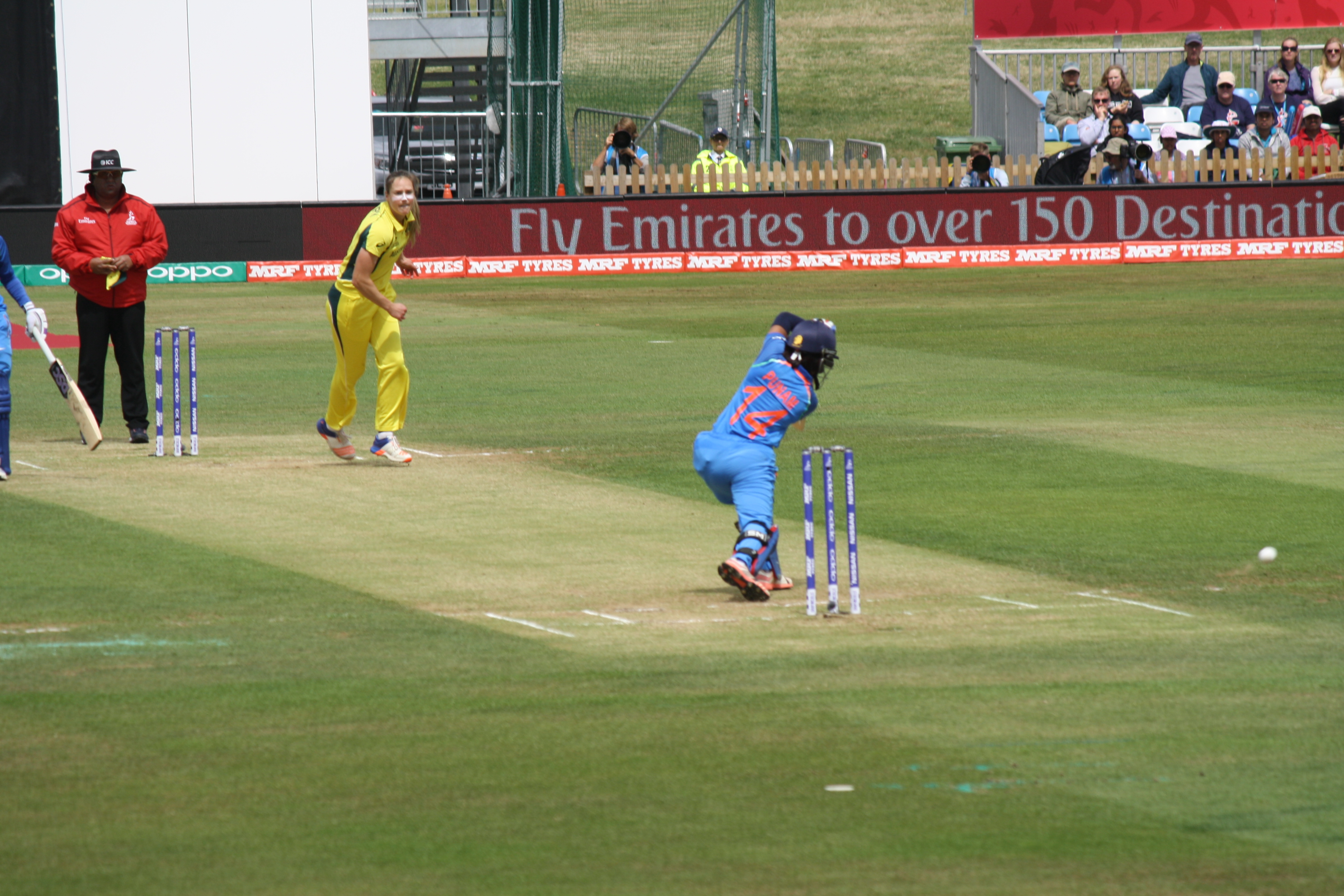
- Raut batting at the 2017 Women's Cricket World Cup

Personal information
- Full name: Punam Ganesh Raut
- Born: 14 October 1989 (age 37); Mumbai, Maharashtra, India
- Batting: Right-handed
- Bowling: Right-arm off break
- Role: Batter

International information
- National side: India (2009–2021)
- Test debut (cap 79): 13 August 2014 v England
- Last Test: 30 September 2021 v Australia
- ODI debut (cap 92): 19 March 2009 v West Indies
- Last ODI: 27 June 2021 v England
- ODI shirt no.: 14
- T20I debut (cap 19): 13 June 2009 v Pakistan
- Last T20I: 2 April 2014 v Pakistan

Domestic team information
- Years: Team
- 2006/07–2010/11: Mumbai
- 2011/12–2021/22: Railways
- 2018–2020: Trailblazers
- 2022/23–present: Uttarakhand

Career statistics
Competition	WTest	ODI	WT20I
Matches	4	73	35
Runs scored	264	2299	719
Batting average	44.00	34.83	27.65
100s/50s	1/0	3/15	0/4
Top score	130	109*	75
Balls bowled	–	30	42
Wickets	–	1	3
Bowling average	–	4.00	9.66
5 wickets in innings	–	0	0
10 wickets in match	–	0	0
Best bowling	–	1/4	3/12
Catches/stumpings	0/–	15/–	5/–
- Source: ESPNcricinfo, 7 November 2023

Punam Ganesh Raut (born 14 October 1989), sometimes spelt Poonam Raut, is a Indian cricketer who played for the Indian women's national team.

== Career ==
Raut is a right-handed batter and known for her batting. On 15 May 2017, in an ODI versus Ireland, Raut set a world record opening partnership of 320 runs with Deepti Sharma, contributing 109. This beat both the standing women's record of 229 (by Sarah Taylor and Caroline Atkins of England) and the standing men's record in ODIs of 286 (by Upul Tharanga and Sanath Jayasuriya of Sri Lanka).

Raut was part of the Indian team to reach the final of the 2017 Women's Cricket World Cup where the team lost to England by nine runs.

In May 2021, she was named in India's Test squad for their one-off match against the England women's cricket team. On 15 October 2026, Raut announced her retirement from international cricket.

== International centuries ==
Test centuries
Runs	Match	Opponents	City	Venue	Year
130	2	South Africa	Mysore, India	Srikantadatta Narasimha Raja Wadeyar Ground	2014

- Source: CricInfo

One Day International centuries
Runs	Match	Opponents	City	Venue	Year
109*	42	Ireland	Potchefstroom, South Africa	Senwes Park	2017
106	50	Australia	Bristol, England	Bristol County Ground	2017
104*	71	South Africa	Lucknow, India	BRSABV Ekana Cricket Stadium	2021

- Source: CricInfo

== See also ==
- List of centuries in women's One Day International cricket
- List of centuries in women's Test cricket
