= Delhi women's cricket team =

Indian women's cricket team

Delhi Women
Personnel
- Captain: Babita Negi

Team information
- Founded: Unknown First recorded match: 1974
- Home ground: Arun Jaitley Stadium, New Delhi
- Capacity: 55,000

History
- WSODT wins: 1
- WSTT wins: 1
- Official website: Delhi & District Cricket Association

The Delhi women's cricket team is a women's cricket team that represents the Indian union territory of Delhi. The team competes in the Women's Senior One Day Trophy and the Women's Senior T20 Trophy. The side has won both trophies once apiece. They have also been runners-up twice in the One-Day Trophy and once in the T20 Trophy.

== Notable players ==
- Anjum Chopra
- Reema Malhotra

== Current squad ==
- Lalita Sharma
- Latika Kumari
- Arti Dhama
- Nirupma Tanwar
- Soni Arushi
- Kamal Bhabya (wk)
- Soni Yadav
- Babita Negi (c)
- Priya Punia
- Shilpa Gupta
- Shweta Sehrawat
- Vandana Chaturvedi
- Neha Chhillar
- Mandeep Kaur
- Sonia Lohiya

== Honours ==
- Women's Senior One Day Trophy:
  - Winners (1): 2011–12
  - Runners-up (2): 2009–10, 2017–18
- Women's Senior T20 Trophy:
  - Winners (1): 2017–18
  - Runners-up (1): 2009–10

== See also ==
- Delhi cricket team
