= Uttar Pradesh women's cricket team =

Women's cricket team in Uttar Pradesh, India

The Uttar Pradesh women's cricket team is an Indian domestic cricket team representing the Indian state of Uttar Pradesh. The team has represented the state in Women's Senior One Day Trophy (List A) and Senior women's T20 league since the 2006–07 and 2008–09 seasons, respectively.

== Honours ==
- Women's Senior One Day Trophy:
  - Runners-up (1): 2012–13
