= Maharashtra women's cricket team =

Indian domestic cricket team

Maharashtra Women
Personnel
- Captain: Priyanka Garkhede
- Owner: Maharashtra Cricket Association

Team information
- Home ground: Maharashtra Cricket Association Cricket Stadium, Pune
- Capacity: 34,000

History
- WSODT wins: 0
- SWTL wins: 0

The Maharashtra women's cricket team is an Indian domestic cricket team representing the Indian state of Maharashtra. The team has represented the state in Women's Senior One Day Trophy (List A) and Women's Senior T20 Trophy. Although the team has reached the final of the two tournaments a combined nine times, as of the 2023–24 season, they have never won the final. The team is owned and govern by Maharashtra Cricket Association. It plays its home games at Gahunje based stadium.

== Current squad ==
- Smriti Mandhana
- Mukta Magre
- Hrutuja Deshmukh
- Shivali Shinde (wk)
- Aditi Gaekwad
- Anuja Patil
- Sayali Lonkar
- Rutuja Gilbile
- Priyanka Ghodke
- Priyanka Garkhede (c)
- Shardda Pokharkar
- Utkarsha Pawar

== Honours ==
- Inter State Women's Competition:
  - Runners-up (1): 2007–08
- Women's Senior One Day Trophy:
  - Runners-up (4): 2006–07, 2007–08, 2008–09, 2016–17
- Women's Senior T20 Trophy:
  - Runners-up (5): 2009–10, 2014–15, 2015–16, 2017–18, 2021–22
