= Kerala women's cricket team =

Indian women's cricket team

Kerala Women's Cricket Team
Personnel
- Captain: Jincy George & Sajana Sajeevan
- Coach: Suman Sharma
- Owner: Kerala Cricket Association

History
- Women's Senior One Day Trophy wins: 0
- Women's Senior T20 Trophy wins: 0
- Official website: KCA

The Kerala women's cricket team is a domestic cricket team based in the Indian state of Kerala. The team has represented the state in Women's Senior One Day Trophy and Senior women's T20 league. As of the 2023–24 season, they have never reached the final of either tournament.

== Playing history ==
Kerala was one of the 24 teams that competed in the inaugural season of Women's Senior One Day Trophy. It competed in the South Zone, against Tamil Nadu, Karnataka, Andhra, Hyderabad and Goa.

== Current squad ==
Players with international caps are listed in bold.

Name	Birth date	Batting style	Bowling style	Notes
Akshaya A	27 May 1998 (age 27)	Right-handed	Right-arm off spin	
Bhoomika H Umbarje				
Jincy George	4 May 1992 (age 33)	Right-handed	Right-arm medium fast	List A captain
Drishya IV	9 February 2000 (age 25)	Right-handed	Right-arm medium fast	
**Minnu Mani**	24 March 1999 (age 26)	Left-handed	Right-arm off spin	
**Sajeevan Sajana**	4 January 1995 (age 30)	Right-handed	Right-arm off spin	T20 captain
Keerthi K James	17 January 1997 (age 28)	Right-handed	Right-arm off spin	
Darsana Mohanan	30 December 1999 (age 25)	Right-handed	Right-arm off spin	
Mrudhula VS	8 October 1996 (age 28)	Right-handed		
Sandra Suren				
Jayalekshmi Dev SJ	25 March 1999 (age 26)	Right-handed	–	Wicket-keeper
Aswathy Babu	30 May 1992 (age 33)	Right-handed		
Aleena Surendran	29 October 2000 (age 24)	Left-handed	Right-arm fast medium	
Sourabhya P	21 April 2001 (age 24)	Right-handed		
Jipsa V Joseph	1 September 1996 (age 28)	Right-handed	Right-arm medium fast	
Najila CMC				
Nithya Loordh				
Divya Ganesh				
Sayoojya Salilan				
