= Rajasthan women's cricket team =

Indian domestic cricket team

The Rajasthan women's cricket team represents the Indian state of Rajasthan in Indian domestic cricket. The team has represented the state in Women's Senior One Day Trophy (List A) and Women's Senior T20 Trophy since the 2006–07 and 2008–09 seasons, respectively, but has never reached the final of either trophy.
