= Mumbai women's cricket team =

Cricket team

The Mumbai women's cricket team is an Indian domestic cricket team representing the city of Mumbai. The team has represented the state in Women's Senior One Day Trophy (List A) and Women's Senior T20 Trophy. They have been the runners-up in the former tournament thrice and won the latter tournament once, in 2023–24.

== Current squad ==
Current Mumbai squad. Players with international caps are listed in bold.

Name	Birth date	Batting style	Bowling style	Notes
**Esha Oza**	1 August 1998 (age 26)	Right-handed	Right-arm off spin	UAE international
Fatima Jaffer	9 September 2002 (age 22)	Right-handed	Right-arm fast	
Humaira Kazi	5 October 1993 (age 31)	Right-handed	Right-arm off spin	
**Jemimah Rodrigues**	9 May 2000 (age 24)	Right-handed	Right-arm off spin	
Manjiri Gawade	24 September 1996 (age 28)	Right-handed	Right-arm medium	
Prakashika Naik	29 October 1997 (age 27)	Right-handed	Right-arm leg spin	
Jagravi Pawar	13 December 1999 (age 25)	Right-handed	Right-arm off spin	
Manali Dakshini	29 September 1997 (age 27)	Right-handed	Right-arm fast	
Prakashika Naik	26 June 1993 (age 31)	Left-handed	Right-arm medium	
**Saima Thakor**	13 September 1996 (age 28)	Right-handed	Right-arm fast	Captain
Hemali Borwankar	6 May 1995 (age 29)	Right-handed	–	Wicket-keeper
Riya Chaudhari	18 October 2001 (age 23)	Right-handed	–	Wicket-keeper
Samruddhi Rawool	15 February 1999 (age 26)	Right-handed	Right-arm off spin	
Saniya Raut	27 August 1999 (age 25)	Left-handed	Slow left-arm orthodox	
**Sayali Satghare**	7 February 2000 (age 25)	Right-handed	Right-arm medium-fast	
Sejal Raut	10 September 2000 (age 24)	Right-handed	Right-arm off spin	
Shweta Haranhalli	29 October 1993 (age 31)	Right-handed	Right-arm medium-fast	
Vrushali Bhagat	25 October 1998 (age 26)	Right-handed	Right-arm off spin	

== Honours ==
- Women's Senior One Day Trophy:
  - Runners-up (3): 2010–11, 2013–14, 2015–16
- Women's Senior T20 Trophy:
  - Winners (1): 2023–24
