= Andhra women's cricket team =

Indian women's cricket team

Andhra Women

Personnel
- Captain: Sneha Deepthi

Team information
- Founded: Unknown First recorded match: 1976
- Home ground: ACA–KDCA Cricket Ground, Mulapadu; Jagarlamudi Kuppuswamy Chowdary College Ground, Guntur; RVR & JC College of Engineering Ground, Guntur

History
- WSODT wins: 0
- WSTT wins: 0

The Andhra women's cricket team is a women's cricket team that represents the Indian state of Andhra Pradesh. The team competes in the Women's Senior One Day Trophy and the Women's Senior T20 Trophy. They finished as runners-up in the 2018–19 Senior Women's One Day League, losing to Bengal in the final by 10 runs, when they were all out with five balls still remaining.

== Honours ==
- Women's Senior One Day Trophy:
  - Runners-up (1): 2018–19

== See also ==
- Andhra cricket team
