= 2017–18 Indian cricket season =

Cricket in India
- Season: 2017–18

Men's cricket
- Ranji Trophy: Vidarbha
- Duleep Trophy: India Red
- Irani Cup: Vidarbha
- Vijay Hazare Trophy: Karnataka
- Deodhar Trophy: India B cricket team
- Syed Mushtaq Ali Trophy: Delhi
- Indian Premier League: Chennai Super Kings

Women's cricket
- Inter Zonal Three Day Game: North Zone
- One Day League: Delhi
- Challenger Trophy: India Blue
- T20 League: Delhi
- Women's T20 Challenge: IPL Supernovas

The 2017–18 Indian cricket season was the 125th cricket season since the commencement of first-class cricket in India. The season started early in September 2017 and ended in March 2018. A first-class match between India Red and India Green in Duleep Trophy marked the beginning of the season. The season included tours from Australia, New Zealand A, New Zealand and Sri Lanka.

Ranji Trophy matches, unlike in the previous season, were played on a home and away basis. The number of matches were reduced from 8 to 6 for each team in league stage, as 28 teams were divided into 4 groups of 7 teams each. Initial plans to scrap the Duleep trophy were reversed by the BCCI and the tournament is now played using pink ball.

International tours
Start date	Against	Results [Matches]		
Start date	Against	Test	ODI	T20I
12 September 2017	Australia	—	4-1 [5]	1-1[3]
23 September 2017	New Zealand A	2-0 [2]	3-0 [5]	—
17 October 2017	New Zealand	—	2-1 [3]	2-1 [3]
16 November 2017	Sri Lanka	1-0 [3]	2-1 [3]	3-0 [3]
Women's International tours
Start date	Against	Results [Matches]		
Start date	Against	Test	ODI	T20I
12 March 2018	Australia	—	0–3 [3]	—
6 April 2018	England	—	2–1 [3]	—
Women's international tournaments
Start date	Tournament			Winners
22 March 2018	2017–18 India women's Tri-Nation Series			Australia
Domestic Tournament
Start date	Tournament		Winners	
7 September 2017	Duleep Trophy		India Red	
6 October 2017	Ranji Trophy		Vidarbha	
7 October 2017	Vinoo Mankad Trophy U-19 Zonal League		North Zone : Delhi; South Zone : Karnataka; Central Zone : Vidarbha; West Zone : Baroda; East Zone : Jharkhand	
8 October 2017	Col C K Nayudu U-23 Trophy		Delhi	
24 October 2017	Vinoo Mankad Trophy U-19 Inter Zonal League		Central Zone	
1 November 2017	Women's U-19 One Day league		Andhra	
5 November 2017	Cooch Behar U-19 Trophy		Vidarbha	
27 November 2017	Men's U-19 Challenger Trophy		India Blue	
1 December 2017	Vijay Merchant U-16 Trophy		Punjab	
6 December 2017	Women's One Day League		Railways	
4 January 2018	Women's Challenger Trophy		India Blue	
12 January 2018	Women's T20 League		Delhi	
21 January 2018	Syed Mushtaq Ali Trophy		Delhi	
21 January 2018	Men's U-23 One-Day League		Punjab	
5 February 2018	Women's Inter Zonal Two Day U-19 League		West Zone	
16 February 2018	Vijay Hazare Trophy		Karnataka	
23 February 2018	Women's U-23 Zonal One Day League		North Zone : Himachal; South Zone : Andhra; Central Zone : Railways; West Zone : Mumbai; East Zone : Bengal	
4 March 2018	Deodhar Trophy		India B	
9 March 2018	Women's U-23 Inter Zonal One Day League		East Zone	
14 March 2018	Irani Cup		Vidarbha	
17 March 2018	Women's U-23 T20 League		Kerala	
18 March 2018	Women's inter zonal three day game		North Zone	

== September ==
=== Duleep Trophy ===
Pos	Team	Mat	Won	Lost	Drawn	Tied	N/R	Net RR	For	Against	Pts
1	India Red	2	1	0	1	0	0	-0.091	1146/329.2	904/253.1	7
2	India Blue	2	0	0	2	0	0	+0.228	621/166.0	616/175.2	4
3	India Green	2	0	1	1	0	0	-0.118	560/171.0	807/237.5	1

advanced to Finals

Group stage
No.	Date	Team 1	Captain 1	Team 2	Captain 2	Venue	Result
1	7 September	India Red	Dinesh Karthik	India Green	Parthiv Patel	Ekana International Cricket Stadium, Lucknow	India Red Won by 170 Runs
2	13 September	India Red	Dinesh Karthik	India Blue	Suresh Raina	Green Park Stadium, Kanpur	Match Drawn India Blue took first innings lead
3	19 September	India Blue	Suresh Raina	India Green	Parthiv Patel	Green Park Stadium, Kanpur	Match Drawn 1st innings unfinished
Final
Final	25 September	India Red	Dinesh Karthik	India Blue	Suresh Raina	Ekana International Cricket Stadium, Lucknow	India Red Won by 163 Runs (winners)

=== Australia in India ===
ODI series
No.	Date	Home captain	Away captain	Venue	Result
ODI 3910	17 September	Virat Kohli	Steve Smith	M. A. Chidambaram Stadium, Chennai	India by 26 runs (D/L)
ODI 3912	21 September	Virat Kohli	Steve Smith	Eden Gardens, Kolkata	India by 50 runs
ODI 3914	24 September	Virat Kohli	Steve Smith	Holkar Stadium, Indore	India by 5 wickets
ODI 3917	28 September	Virat Kohli	Steve Smith	M. Chinnaswamy Stadium, Bangalore	Australia by 21 runs
ODI 3919	1 October	Virat Kohli	Steve Smith	Vidarbha Cricket Association Stadium, Nagpur	India by 7 wickets
T20I series
No.	Date	Home captain	Away captain	Venue	Result
T20I 623	7 October	Virat Kohli	David Warner	JSCA International Stadium Complex, Ranchi	India by 9 wickets (D/L)
T20I 624	10 October	Virat Kohli	David Warner	Barsapara Cricket Stadium, Guwahati	Australia by 8 wickets
T20I 624a	13 October	Virat Kohli	David Warner	Rajiv Gandhi International Cricket Stadium, Hyderabad	Match abandoned

=== New Zealand A in India ===
Unofficial Test series
No.	Date	Home captain	Away captain	Venue	Result
01	23 September	Karun Nair	Henry Nicholls	Vijayawada	India A Won by an innings and 31 Runs
02	30 September	Karun Nair	Henry Nicholls	Gokaraju Liala Gangaaraju ACA Cricket Ground, Mulapadu	India A Won by an innings and 26 Runs
Unofficial ODI series
No.	Date	Home captain	Away captain	Venue	Result
01	7 October	Shreyas Iyer	Henry Nicholls	Dr. Y.S. Rajasekhara Reddy ACA-VDCA Cricket Stadium, Vizag	Match Abandoned
02	10 October	Shreyas Iyer	Henry Nicholls	Dr. Y.S. Rajasekhara Reddy ACA-VDCA Cricket Stadium, Vizag	Match Tied
03	11 October	Shreyas Iyer	Henry Nicholls	Dr. Y.S. Rajasekhara Reddy ACA-VDCA Cricket Stadium, Vizag	India A Won by 6 Wickets
04	13 October	Rishabh Pant	Henry Nicholls	Dr. Y.S. Rajasekhara Reddy ACA-VDCA Cricket Stadium, Vizag	India A Won by 64 Runs
05	15 October	Rishabh Pant	Henry Nicholls	Dr. Y.S. Rajasekhara Reddy ACA-VDCA Cricket Stadium, Vizag	India A Won by 3 Wickets

== October ==
=== Ranji Trophy ===
==== Group stage ====
Group A

Team	Pld	W	L	D	A	Pts	NRR
Karnataka	6	4	0	2	0	32	+0.479
Delhi	6	3	0	3	0	27	+0.333
Maharashtra	6	2	2	1	1	16	+0.084
Hyderabad	6	2	1	1	2	16	–0.156
Railways	6	2	3	1	0	14	–0.312
Uttar Pradesh	6	0	3	2	1	5	+0.508
Assam	6	0	4	2	0	2	–0.977

- Top two teams advanced to the knockout stage

No.	Date	Home team	Captain	Away team	Captain	Venue	Result
1	6 October	Delhi	Ishant Sharma	Assam	Gokul Sharma	Feroz Shah Kotla Stadium, New Delhi	Match Drawn Delhi took first innings lead
11	6 October	Uttar Pradesh	Suresh Raina	Railways	Mahesh Rawat	Ekana International Cricket Stadium, Lucknow	Railways Won by 21 Runs
12	6 October	Hyderabad	Ambati Rayudu	Maharashtra	Rahul Tripathi	Gymkhana Ground, Hyderabad	Play called off
22	14 October	Railways	Mahesh Rawat	Delhi	Ishant Sharma	Karnail Singh Stadium, New Delhi	Delhi Won by an innings and 105 Runs
23	14 October	Hyderabad	Ambati Rayudu	Uttar Pradesh	Suresh Raina	Gymkhana Ground, Hyderabad	Match Abandoned
24	14 October	Karnataka	Vinay Kumar	Assam	Gokul Sharma	SDNRW Ground, Mysore	Karnataka Won by an innings and 121 Runs
34	24 October	Assam	Gokul Sharma	Railways	Mahesh Rawat	Barsapara Cricket Stadium, Guwahati	Railways Won by an innings and 184 Runs
35	24 October	Uttar Pradesh	Suresh Raina	Maharashtra	Rahul Tripathi	Ekana International Cricket Stadium, Lucknow	Maharashtra Won by 31 Runs
36	24 October	Karnataka	Vinay Kumar	Hyderabad	Ambati Rayudu	KSCA Navale Stadium, Shimoga	Karnataka Won by 59 Runs
46	1 November	Railways	Mahesh Rawat	Hyderabad	Ambati Rayudu	Karnail Singh Stadium, New Delhi	Hyderabad Won by 10 Wickets
47	1 November	Delhi	Ishant Sharma	Uttar Pradesh	Suresh Raina	Airforce Complex ground, Palam, New Delhi	Delhi Won by 4 Wickets
48	1 November	Maharashtra	Ankit Bawane	Karnataka	Vinay Kumar	MCA Cricket Stadium, Gahunje, Pune	Karnataka Won by an innings and 136 Runs
58	9 November	Assam	Gokul Sharma	Uttar Pradesh	Suresh Raina	Barsapara Cricket Stadium, Guwahati	Match Drawn Uttar Pradesh took first innings lead
59	9 November	Maharashtra	Ankit Bawane	Railways	Mahesh Rawat	MCA Cricket Stadium, Gahunje, Pune	Match Drawn Maharashtra took first innings lead
60	9 November	Karnataka	Vinay Kumar	Delhi	Ishant Sharma	Alur Cricket Stadium-II, Alur	Match Drawn Karnataka took first innings lead
70	17 November	Delhi	Rishabh Pant	Maharashtra	Ankit Bawane	Airforce Complex Ground, Palam, New Delhi	Delhi Won by an innings and 61 Runs
71	17 November	Assam	Gokul Sharma	Hyderabad	Ambati Rayudu	Barsapara Cricket Stadium, Guwahati	Hyderabad Won by 4 Wickets
72	17 November	Uttar Pradesh	Suresh Raina	Karnataka	Vinay Kumar	Green Park Stadium, Kanpur	Match Drawn Karnataka took first innings lead
82	25 November	Hyderabad	Ambati Rayudu	Delhi	Rishabh Pant	Rajiv Gandhi International Cricket Stadium, Hyderabad	Match Drawn Delhi took first innings lead
83	25 November	Maharashtra	Ankit Bawane	Assam	Gokul Sharma	Pune Cricket Club Ground, Pune	Maharashtra Won by 7 Wickets
84	25 November	Railways	Ankit Bawane	Karnataka	Vinay Kumar	Karnail Singh Stadium, New Delhi	Karnataka Won by 209 Runs

Group B

Team	Pld	W	L	D	A	Pts	NRR
Gujarat	6	5	0	1	0	34	+0.097
Kerala	6	5	1	0	0	31	+0.636
Saurashtra	6	3	1	2	0	26	+0.245
Jammu & Kashmir	6	1	4	1	0	9	–0.077
Haryana	6	1	4	1	0	9	–0.506
Jharkhand	6	1	4	1	0	8	–0.049
Rajasthan	6	0	2	4	0	6	–0.294

- Top two teams advanced to the knockout stage

No.	Date	Home team	Captain	Away team	Captain	Venue	Result
8	6 October	Haryana	Mohit Sharma	Saurashtra	Cheteshwar Pujara	Chaudhry Bansi Lal Cricket Stadium, Lahli	Saurashtra Won by an innings and 31 Runs
9	6 October	Rajasthan	Pankaj Singh	J & K	Parvez Rasool	Sawai Mansingh Stadium, Jaipur	Match Drawn J & K took first innings lead
10	6 October	Kerala	Sachin Baby	Jharkhand	Varun Aaron	Greenfield International Stadium, Trivandrum	Kerala Won by 9 Wickets
19	14 October	Saurashtra	Cheteshwar Pujara	J & K	Parvez Rasool	Saurashtra Cricket Association Stadium, Rajkot	Saurashtra Won by an innings and 212 Runs
20	14 October	Rajasthan	Pankaj Singh	Jharkhand	Saurabh Tiwary	Sawai Mansingh Stadium, Jaipur	Match Drawn Rajasthan took first innings lead
21	14 October	Gujarat	Parthiv Patel	Kerala	Sachin Baby	Shambhubhai V Patel Stadium, Nadiad	Gujarat Won by 4 Wickets
31	24 October	Gujarat	Parthiv Patel	J & K	Parvez Rasool	Lalbhai Contractor Stadium, Surat	Gujarat Won by an innings and 64 Runs
32	24 October	Jharkhand	Saurabh Tiwary	Haryana	Mohit Sharma	JSCA International Stadium Complex, Ranchi	Jharkhand Won by 10 Wickets
33	24 October	Kerala	Sachin Baby	Rajasthan	Pankaj Singh	St'Xavier's KCA Cricket Ground, Trivandrum	Kerala Won by 131 Runs
43	1 November	J & K	Parvez Rasool	Kerala	Sachin Baby	St'Xavier's KCA Cricket Ground, Trivandrum	Kerala Won by 158 Runs
44	1 November	Gujarat	Parthiv Patel	Haryana	Amit Mishra	Sardar Patel Stadium, Valsad	Gujarat Won by 238 Runs
45	1 November	Saurashtra	Cheteshwar Pujara	Jharkhand	Saurabh Tiwary	Madhavrao Scindia Cricket Ground, Rajkot	Saurashtra Won by 6 Wickets
55	9 November	Haryana	Amit Mishra	Rajasthan	Pankaj Singh	Chaudhry Bansi Lal Cricket Stadium, Lahli	Match Drawn Haryana took first innings lead
56	9 November	Jharkhand	Saurabh Tiwary	J & K	Parvez Rasool	Keenan Stadium, Jamshedpur	J & K Won by 106 Runs
57	9 November	Saurashtra	Cheteshwar Pujara	Gujarat	Parthiv Patel	Saurashtra Cricket Association Stadium, Rajkot	Match Drawn Saurashtra took first innings lead
67	17 November	Gujarat	Parthiv Patel	Rajasthan	Pankaj Singh	Lalbhai Contractor Stadium, Surat	Gujarat Won by an innings and 107 Runs
68	17 November	Haryana	Amit Mishra	J & K	Parvez Rasool	Chaudhry Bansi Lal Cricket Stadium, Lahli	Haryana Won by 18 Runs
69	17 November	Kerala	Sachin Baby	Saurashtra	Cheteshwar Pujara	St'Xavier's KCA Cricket Ground, Trivandrum	Kerala Won by 309 Runs
79	25 November	Rajasthan	Dishant Yagnik	Saurashtra	Jaydev Unadkat	Sawai Mansingh Stadium, Jaipur	Match Drawn Saurashtra took first innings lead
80	25 November	Jharkhand	Shahbaz Nadeem	Gujarat	Parthiv Patel	JSCA International Stadium Complex, Ranchi	Gujarat Won by 10 Wickets
81	25 November	Haryana	Amit Mishra	Kerala	Sachin Baby	Chaudhry Bansi Lal Cricket Stadium, Lahli	Kerala Won by an innings and 8 Runs

Group C

Team	Pld	W	L	D	A	Pts	NRR
Madhya Pradesh	6	3	1	2	0	21	–0.116
Mumbai	6	2	0	4	0	21	+0.228
Andhra	6	1	0	5	0	19	+0.326
Baroda	6	1	1	4	0	16	+0.508
Tamil Nadu	6	0	1	5	0	11	–0.112
Odisha	6	0	2	4	0	6	–0.648
Tripura	6	0	2	4	0	4	–0.426

- Top two teams advanced to the knockout stage

No.	Date	Home team	Captain	Away team	Captain	Venue	Result
5	6 October	Madhya Pradesh	Devendra Bundela	Baroda	Irfan Pathan	Holkar Stadium, Indore	Madhya Pradesh won by 8 wickets
6	6 October	Odisha	Govinda Poddar	Tripura	M B Murasingh	Vikas Cricket Ground, Cuttack	Match Drawn 1st innings unfinished
7	6 October	Tamil Nadu	Abhinav Mukund	Andhra	Hanuma Vihari	M A Chidambaram Stadium, Chennai	Match Drawn Andhra took first innings lead
13	14 October	Baroda	Irfan Pathan	Andhra	Hanuma Vihari	Reliance Cricket Stadium, Vadodara	Match Drawn Andhra took first innings lead
14	14 October	Madhya Pradesh	Devendra Bundela	Mumbai	Suryakumar Yadav	Emerald Heights International School Ground, Indore	Match Drawn Mumbai took first innings lead
18	14 October	Tamil Nadu	Abhinav Mukund	Tripura	M B Murasingh	M A Chidambaram Stadium, Chennai	Match Drawn Tamil Nadu took first innings lead
25	24 October	Andhra	Hanuma Vihari	Odisha	Govinda Poddar	Dr P.V.G. Raju ACA Sports Complex, Vizianagaram	Match Drawn Andhra took first innings lead
26	24 October	Mumbai	Suryakumar Yadav	Tamil Nadu	Abhinav Mukund	Sharad Pawar Cricket Academy BKC, Mumbai	Match Drawn Tamil Nadu took first innings lead
30	24 October	Tripura	M B Murasingh	Madhya Pradesh	Devendra Bundela	MBB Stadium, Agartala	Madhya Pradesh Won by 10 Wickets
37	1 November	Baroda	Deepak Hooda	Tripura	M B Murasingh	Reliance Cricket Stadium, Vadodara	Match Drawn Baroda took first innings lead
38	1 November	Andhra	Hanuma Vihari	Madhya Pradesh	Devendra Bundela	Dr P.V.G. Raju ACA Sports Complex, Vizianagaram	Andhra Won by 8 Wickets
42	1 November	Odisha	Govinda Poddar	Mumbai	Aditya Tare	KIIT Cricket Stadium, Bhubaneshwar	Mumbai Won by 120 Runs
49	9 November	Tripura	M B Murasingh	Andhra	Hanuma Vihari	MBB Stadium, Agartala	Match Drawn Andhra took first innings lead
50	9 November	Odisha	Govinda Poddar	Tamil Nadu	Abhinav Mukund	DRIEMS Ground, Cuttack	Match Drawn Odisha took first innings lead
54	9 November	Mumbai	Aditya Tare	Baroda	Deepak Hooda	Wankhede Stadium, Mumbai	Match Drawn Baroda took first innings lead
61	17 November	Madhya Pradesh	Devendra Bundela	Tamil Nadu	Abhinav Mukund	Holkar Stadium, Indore	Match Drawn Tamil Nadu took first innings lead
62	17 November	Baroda	Deepak Hooda	Odisha	Govinda Poddar	Reliance Cricket Stadium, Vadodara	Match Drawn Baroda took first innings lead
66	17 November	Andhra	Hanuma Vihari	Mumbai	Aditya Tare	CSR Sharma College Ground, Ongole	Match Drawn Mumbai took first innings lead
73	25 November	Baroda	Deepak Hooda	Tamil Nadu	Abhinav Mukund	Motibaug Cricket Ground, Vadodara	Baroda Won by 102 Runs
74	25 November	Madhya Pradesh	Govinda Poddar	Odisha	Devendra Bundela	Holkar Stadium, Indore	Madhya Pradesh Won by 7 Wickets
78	25 November	Mumbai	Aditya Tare	Tripura	M B Murasingh	Wankhede Stadium, Mumbai	Mumbai Won by 10 Wickets

Group D

Team	Pld	W	L	D	A	Pts	NRR
Vidarbha	6	4	0	2	0	31	+0.358
Bengal	6	2	1	3	0	23	+0.367
Punjab	6	2	2	2	0	18	+0.609
Himachal Pradesh	6	1	1	4	0	14	+0.300
Chhattisgarh	6	1	3	2	0	13	–0.514
Services	6	1	2	3	0	10	–0.273
Goa	6	0	2	4	0	6	–0.700

- Top two teams advanced to the knockout stage

No.	Date	Home team	Captain	Away team	Captain	Venue	Result
2	6 October	Services	Nakul Verma	Bengal	Manoj Tiwary	Airforce Complex ground, Palam, New Delhi	Match Drawn Bengal took first innings lead
3	6 October	Goa	Sagun Kamat	Chhattisgarh	Mohammed Kaif	Goa Cricket Association Academy, Porvorim	Match Drawn Chhattisgarh took first innings lead
4	6 October	Himachal	Sumeet Verma	Punjab	Jiwanjot Singh	Himachal Pradesh Cricket Association Stadium, Dharamsala	Match Drawn Himachal took first innings lead
15	14 October	Punjab	Yuvraj Singh	Vidarbha	Faiz Fazal	IS Bindra Cricket Stadium, PCA, Mohali	Vidarbha Won by an innings and 117 Runs
16	14 October	Himachal	Sumeet Verma	Goa	Sagun Kamat	Himachal Pradesh Cricket Association Stadium, Dharamsala	Match Drawn Himachal took first innings lead
17	14 October	Chhattisgarh	Mohammed Kaif	Bengal	Manoj Tiwary	Shaheed Veer Narayan Singh International Stadium, Raipur	Bengal Won by an innings and 160 Runs
27	24 October	Goa	Sagun Kamat	Punjab	Yuvraj Singh	Goa Cricket Association Academy, Porvorim	Punjab Won by an innings and 133 Runs
28	24 October	Services	Nakul Verma	Himachal	Sumeet Verma	Airforce Complex ground, Palam, New Delhi	Himachal Won by 97 Runs
29	24 October	Vidarbha	Faiz Fazal	Chhattisgarh	Mohammed Kaif	Vidarbha Cricket Association Stadium, Nagpur	Match Drawn Chhattisgarh took first innings lead
39	1 November	Bengal	Manoj Tiwary	Himachal	Sumeet Verma	Eden Gardens, Kolkata	Match Drawn Bengal took first innings lead
40	1 November	Vidarbha	Faiz Fazal	Services	Nakul Verma	VCA Ground, Nagpur	Vidarbha Won by 192 Runs
41	1 November	Chhattisgarh	Mohammed Kaif	Punjab	Jiwanjot Singh	Shaheed Veer Narayan Singh	Punjab Won by an innings and 118 Runs
51	9 November	Bengal	Manoj Tiwary	Vidarbha	Faiz Fazal	Bengal Cricket Academy Ground, Kalyani	Vidarbha Won by 10 Wickets
52	9 November	Himachal	Sumeet Verma	Chhattisgarh	Abhimanyu Chauhan	Himachal Pradesh Cricket Association Stadium, Dharamsala	Chhattisgarh Won by an innings and 114 Runs
53	9 November	Services	Rahul Singh	Goa	Nakul Verma	Airforce Complex ground, Palam, New Delhi	Match Drawn Goa took first innings lead
63	17 November	Punjab	Harbhajan Singh	Bengal	Manoj Tiwary	Gandhi Ground, Amritsar	Bengal Won by an innings and 19 Runs
64	17 November	Chhattisgarh	Abhimanyu Chauhan	Services	Nakul Verma	Shaheed Veer Narayan Singh International Stadium, Raipur	Services Won by an innings and 9 Runs
65	17 November	Goa	Darshan Misal	Vidarbha	Faiz Fazal	Go Cricket Association Academy, Porvorim	Vidarbha Won by an innings and 37 Runs
75	25 November	Punjab	Harbhajan Singh	Services	Nakul Verma	Gandhi Ground, Amritsar	Match Drawn Punjab took first innings lead
76	25 November	Vidarbha	Faiz Fazal	Himachal	Sumeet Verma	VCA Ground, Nagpur	Match Drawn Vidarbha took first innings lead
77	25 November	Bengal	Manoj Tiwary	Goa	Darshan Misal	Eden Gardens, Kolkata	Match Drawn Bengal took first innings lead

==== Knockout stage ====
No.	Date	Team 1	Captain	Team 2	Captain	Venue	Result
Quarter-finals
85	7 December	Mumbai	Aditya Tare	Karnataka	Vinay Kumar	Vidarbha Cricket Stadium, Nagpur	Karnataka Won by an innings and 20 Runs
86	7 December	Kerala	Sachin Baby	Vidarbha	Faiz Fazal	Lalbhai Contractor Stadium, Surat	Vidarbha Won by 412 Runs
87	7 December	Delhi	Rishabh Pant	Madhya Pradesh	Devendra Bundela	Gokaraju Laila Gangaraju ACA Cricket Ground, Mulapadu	Delhi Won by 7 Wickets
88	7 December	Gujarat	Parthiv Patel	Bengal	Manoj Tiwary	SMS Stadium, Jaipur	Match drawn Bengal took first innings lead
Semi-finals
89	17 December	Bengal	Manoj Tiwary	Delhi	Rishabh Pant	MCA Cricket Stadium, Gahujne, Pune	Delhi Won by an innings and 26 Runs
90	17 December	Vidarbha	Faiz Fazal	Karnataka	Vinay Kumar	Eden Gardens, Kolkata	Vidarbha Won by 5 Runs
Final
91	29 December	Delhi	Rishabh Pant	Vidarbha	Faiz Fazal	Holkar Stadium, Indore	Vidarbha Won by 9 Wickets

=== Vinoo Mankad Trophy Zonal League ===
==== North Zone ====
Pos	Team	Mat	Won	Lost	Drawn	Tied	N/R	Net RR	For	Against	Pts
1	Delhi	4	4	0	0	0	0	+1.463	836/178.3	644/200.0	16
2	Punjab	4	2	2	0	0	0	+1.093	700/168.2	584/190.3	8
3	Haryana	4	2	2	0	0	0	-0.043	688/183.4	711/187.4	8
4	Himachal	4	1	3	0	0	0	-1.010	564/187.4	617/153.4	4
5	J & K	4	1	3	0	0	0	-1.480	640/200.0	872/186.2	4

winner of North zone

No.	Date	Team 1	Team 2	Venue	Result
1	7 October	Haryana	Himachal	Patchy Greens, Teri	Himachal Won by 6 Wickets
2	7 October	Delhi	J & K	Sehwag International School, Jhajjar	Delhi Won by 163 Runs
13	9 October	J & K	Himachal	Sehwag International School, Jhajjar	J & K Won by 51 Runs
14	9 October	Punjab	Haryana	Teri Cricket Ground, Teri	Haryana Won by 3 Wickets
28	11 October	Delhi	Haryana	Patchy Greens, Teri	Delhi Won by 26 Runs
29	11 October	Himachal	Punjab	Sehwag International School, Jhajjar	Punjab Won by 7 Wickets
40	13 October	J & K	Haryana	Teri Cricket Ground, Teri	Haryana Won by 6 Wickets
41	13 October	Punjab	Delhi	Sehwag International School, Jhajjar	Delhi Won by 3 Wickets
54	15 October	Himachal	Delhi	Sehwag International School, Jhajjar	Delhi Won by 6 Wickets
55	15 October	Punjab	J & K	Teri Cricket Ground, Teri	Punjab Won by 117 Runs

==== South Zone ====
Pos	Team	Mat	Won	Lost	Drawn	Tied	N/R	Net RR	For	Against	Pts
1	Karnataka	5	3	1	0	0	1	+0.764	606/123.0	598/143.4	14
2	Andhra	5	3	1	0	0	1	+0.533	622/138.0	508/127.5	14
3	Hyderabad	5	3	1	0	0	1	-0.018	665/154.4	708/164.0	14
4	Kerala	5	1	2	0	0	2	-0.161	431/114.4	486/124.0	8
5	Tamil Nadu	5	1	3	0	0	1	-0.212	413/125.0	426/121.1	6
6	Goa	5	0	3	0	0	2	-1.005	492/131.0	503/105.4	4

winner of South zone

No.	Date	Team 1	Team 2	Venue	Result
3	7 October	Kerala	Hyderabad	Alur Cricket Stadium-II, Alur	Hyderabad Won by 7 Wickets
4	7 October	Andhra	Tamil Nadu	Alur Cricket Stadium-III, Alur	Andhra Won by 9 Runs
5	7 October	Goa	Karnataka	Alur Cricket Stadium, Alur	Karnataka Won by 7 Wickets
8	8 October	Tamil Nadu	Kerala	Alur Cricket Stadium-III, Alur	Kerala Won by 8 Wickets
9	8 October	Goa	Hyderabad	Alur Cricket Stadium-II, Alur	Hyderabad Won by 4 Wickets
10	8 October	Andhra	Karnataka	Alur Cricket Stadium, Alur	Karnataka Won by 7 Wickets
19	10 October	Andhra	Kerala	Alur Cricket Stadium-III, Alur	Andhra Won by 55 Runs
20	10 October	Karnataka	Hyderabad	Alur Cricket Stadium, Alur	Hyderabad Won by 6 Wickets
21	10 October	Goa	Tamil Nadu	Alur Cricket Stadium-II, Alur	Tamil Nadu Won by 6 Wickets
30	12 October	Andhra	Hyderabad	Alur Cricket Stadium, Alur	Andhra Won by 52 Runs
31	12 October	Tamil Nadu	Karnataka	Alur Cricket Stadium-II, Alur	Karnataka Won by 8 Wickets
32	12 October	Goa	Kerala	Alur Cricket Stadium-III, Alur	Match Abandoned
46	14 October	Goa	Andhra	Alur Cricket Stadium-III, Alur	Match Abandoned
47	14 October	Kerala	Karnataka	Alur Cricket Stadium-II, Alur	No Result
48	14 October	Hyderabad	Tamil Nadu	Alur Cricket Stadium, Alur	No Result

==== Central Zone ====
Pos	Team	Mat	Won	Lost	Drawn	Tied	N/R	Net RR	For	Against	Pts
1	Vidarbha	5	5	0	0	0	0	+1.743	938/181.4	855/250.0	20
2	Uttar Pradesh	5	4	1	0	0	0	+1.363	1264/239.2	975/248.5	16
3	Madhya Pradesh	5	3	2	0	0	0	+0.150	1106/240.4	1064/239.2	12
4	Chhattisgarh	5	2	3	0	0	0	+0.409	1093/250.0	961/242.3	8
5	Rajasthan	5	1	4	0	0	0	-0.408	721/212.0	824/216.2	4
6	Railways	5	0	5	0	0	0	-3.545	625/250.0	1068/176.4	0

winner of Central zone

No.	Date	Team 1	Team 2	Venue	Result
6	7 October	Madhya Pradesh	Chhattisgarh	Scindia School Cricket Ground, Gwalior	Madhya Pradesh Won by 7 Runs
7	7 October	Uttar Pradesh	Railways	Captain Roop Singh Stadium, Gwalior	Uttar Pradesh Won by 158 Runs
11	8 October	Rajasthan	Vidarbha	Scindia School Cricket Ground, Gwalior	Vidarbha Won by 9 Wickets
12	8 October	Madhya Pradesh	Railways	Captain Roop Singh Stadium, Gwalior	Madhya Pradesh Won by 104 Runs
17	9 October	Chhattisgarh	Rajasthan	Captain Roop Singh Stadium, Gwalior	Chhattisgarh Won by 9 Runs
18	9 October	Uttar Pradesh	Vidarbha	Scindia School Cricket Ground, Gwalior	Vidarbha Won by 5 Wickets
27	10 October	Chhattisgarh	Railways	Captain Roop Singh Stadium, Gwalior	Chhattisgarh Won by 179 Runs
38	12 October	Railways	Rajasthan	Scindia School Cricket Ground, Gwalior	Rajasthan Won by 9 Wickets
39	12 October	Madhya Pradesh	Uttar Pradesh	Captain Roop Singh Stadium, Gwalior	Uttar Pradesh Won by 6 Wickets
44	13 October	Chhattisgarh	Vidarbha	Captain Roop Singh Stadium, Gwalior	Vidarbha Won by 9 Wickets
45	13 October	Uttar Pradesh	Rajasthan	Scindia School Cricket Ground, Gwalior	Uttar Pradesh Won by 89 Runs
52	14 October	Rajasthan	Madhya Pradesh	Captain Roop Singh Stadium, Gwalior	Madhya Pradesh Won by 7 Wickets
53	14 October	Railways	Vidarbha	Scindia School Cricket Ground, Gwalior	Vidarbha Won by 10 Wickets
58	15 October	Vidarbha	Madhya Pradesh	Captain Roop Singh Stadium, Gwalior	Vidarbha Won by 69 Runs
59	15 October	Uttar Pradesh	Chhattisgarh	Scindia School Cricket Ground, Gwalior	Uttar Pradesh Won by 45 Runs

==== West Zone ====
Pos	Team	Mat	Won	Lost	Drawn	Tied	N/R	Net RR	For	Against	Pts
1	Baroda	4	2	1	0	0	1	+1.025	420/94.4	423/124.0	10
2	Maharashtra	4	2	1	0	0	1	-0.200	548/138.0	538/129.0	10
3	Gujarat	4	2	1	0	0	1	-0.499	397/99.4	387/86.2	10
4	Mumbai	4	2	2	0	0	0	+0.143	745/159.0	748/164.4	8
5	Saurashtra	4	0	3	0	0	1	-0.822	467/101.0	481/88.2	2

winner of West zone

No.	Date	Team 1	Team 2	Venue	Result
15	9 October	Mumbai	Baroda	BKC Ground, Mumbai	Baroda Won by 7 Wickets
25	10 October	Saurashtra	Mumbai	BKC Ground, Mumbai	Mumbai Won by 8 Wickets
36	12 October	Maharashtra	Baroda	Sachin Tendulkar Gymkhana, Kandivili, Mumbai	Baroda Won by 6 Wickets
37	12 October	Gujarat	Mumbai	Sharad Pawar Cricket Academy BKC, Mumbai	Mumbai Won by 6 Wickets
42	13 October	Saurashtra	Gujarat	BKC Ground, Mumbai	Gujarat Won by 6 Wickets (VJD Method)
43	13 October	Maharashtra	Mumbai	MIG Cricket Club, Mumbai	Maharashtra Won by 5 Runs
66	14 October	Maharashtra	Saurashtra	Sachin Tendulkar Gymkhana, Kandivili, Mumbai	Maharashtra Won by 10 Runs (VJD Method)
67	14 October	Gujarat	Baroda	MIG Cricket Club, Mumbai	Gujarat Won by 10 Runs (VJD Method)
56	15 October	Maharashtra	Gujarat	Sachin Tendulkar Gymkhana, Kandivili, Mumbai	Match Abandoned
57	15 October	Baroda	Saurashtra	MIG Cricket Club, Mumbai	Match Abandoned

==== East Zone ====
Pos	Team	Mat	Won	Lost	Drawn	Tied	N/R	Net RR	For	Against	Pts
1	Jharkhand	5	5	0	0	0	0	+1.934	543/109.1	529/174.0	20
2	Bengal	5	3	2	0	0	0	+1.736	570/118.3	584/190.0	12
3	Tripura	5	3	2	0	0	0	-0.301	747/212.1	735/192.2	12
4	Assam	5	2	3	0	0	0	+0.153	784/220.0	681/199.4	8
5	Odisha	5	1	4	0	0	0	-1.131	548/195.5	628/159.5	4
6	A And A Team	5	1	4	0	0	0	-1.326	655/221.0	690/160.5	4

winner of East zone

No.	Date	Team 1	Team 2	Venue	Result
49	14 October	Assam	Bengal	Railway Stadium, Dhanbad	Bengal Won by 9 Wickets
50	14 October	Jharkhand	Odisha		Jharkhand Won (Match Awarded)
51	14 October	Tripura	A and A	Jawaharlal Nehru Stadium, Jealgora, Dhanbad	Tripura Won by 68 Runs
68	15 October	Jharkhand	Bengal	Jawaharlal Nehru Stadium, Jealgora, Dhanbad	Jharkhand Won by 4 Runs
69	15 October	Odisha	Tripura	Railway Stadium, Dhanbad	Tripura Won by 3 Wickets
70	15 October	A and A	Assam	TATA Digwadih Stadium, Dhanbad	A and A Team Won by 40 Runs
60	16 October	Assam	Tripura	TATA Digwadih Stadium, Dhanbad	Assam Won by 79 Runs
61	16 October	Bengal	Odisha	Jawaharlal Nehru Stadium, Jealgora, Dhanbad	Bengal Won by 10 Wickets
62	16 October	Jharkhand	A and A	Railway Stadium, Dhanbad	Jharkhand Won by 9 Wickets
71	17 October	Assam	Jharkhand	TATA Digwadih Stadium, Dhanbad	Jharkhand Won by 8 Wickets
72	17 October	Bengal	Tripura	Railway Stadium, Dhanbad	Tripura Won by 20 Runs (VJD Method)
73	17 October	Odisha	A and A	Jawaharlal Nehru Stadium, Jealgora, Dhanbad	Odisha Won by 6 Wickets
63	18 October	Assam	Odisha	Railway Stadium, Dhanbad	Assam Won by 71 Runs
64	18 October	Jharkhand	Tripura	TATA Digwadih Stadium, Dhanbad	Jharkhand Won by 10 Wickets
65	18 October	Bengal	A and A	Jawaharlal Nehru Stadium, Jealgora, Dhanbad	Bengal Won by 8 Wickets

=== Col C K Nayudu Trophy ===
==== Elite Group ====
Elite Group A

Team	Pld	W	L	D	T	N/R	Pts	NRR
Punjab	4	3	0	1	0	0	23	+0.471
Delhi	4	1	0	3	0	0	14	+0.175
Maharashtra	4	1	2	1	0	0	7	+0.395
Himachal	4	1	2	1	0	0	7	-0.128
Vidarbha	4	1	3	0	0	0	6	-0.694

- Top two teams advanced to the knockout stage
- Last team relegated to Plate group 2018-19

No.	Date	Team 1	Team 2	Venue	Result
1	8 October	Punjab	Vidarbha	Dhruv Pandove Stadium, Patiala	Punjab Won by an innings and 10 Runs
2	8 October	Maharashtra	Delhi	Pune Cricket Club Ground, Pune	Match Drawn Delhi took first innings lead
13	15 October	Punjab	Himachal	Dhruv Pandove Stadium, Patiala	Punjab Won by an innings and 91 Runs
14	15 October	Vidarbha	Delhi	Nagpur	Delhi Won by an innings and 23 Runs
25	26 October	Himachal	Maharashtra	Luhnu Cricket ground, Bilaspur	Himachal Won by 5 Wickets
26	26 October	Punjab	Delhi	IS Bindra Cricket Stadium, PCA, Mohali	Match Drawn Punjab took first innings lead
37	3 November	Maharashtra	Vidarbha	Deccan Gymkhana Cricket Ground, Pune	Maharashtra Won by 9 Wickets
38	3 November	Himachal	Delhi	Luhnu Cricket ground, Bilaspur	Match Drawn Delhi took first innings lead
49	11 November	Maharashtra	Punjab	Aurangabad District Cricket Association Ground, Aurangabad	Punjab Won by 232 Runs
50	11 November	Himachal	Vidarbha	Luhnu Cricket ground, Bilaspur	Vidarbha Won by 5 Wickets

Elite Group B

Team	Pld	W	L	D	T	N/R	Pts	NRR
Tamil Nadu	4	3	0	1	0	0	20	+0.114
Mumbai	4	1	0	3	0	0	14	+0.847
Gujarat	4	1	1	2	0	0	8	-0.659
Haryana	4	1	3	0	0	0	6	-0.433
Kerala	4	0	2	2	0	0	4	+0.187

- Top two teams advanced to the knockout stage
- Last team relegated to Plate group 2018-19

No.	Date	Team 1	Team 2	Venue	Result
3	8 October	Kerala	Gujarat	Krishnagiri Stadium, Wayanad	Match Drawn Kerala took first innings lead
4	8 October	Tamil Nadu	Mumbai	ICL Sankar Nagar Cricket Ground, Thirunelveli	Match Drawn Mumbai took first innings lead
15	15 October	Haryana	Kerala	Chaudhry Bansi Lal Cricket Stadium, Lahli	Haryana Won by 33 Runs
16	15 October	Mumbai	Gujarat	Sharad Pawar Cricket Academy BKC, Mumbai	Match Drawn 1st innings unfinished
27	26 October	Tamil Nadu	Haryana	NPR College Ground, Dindigul	Tamil Nadu Won by an innings and 59 Runs
28	26 October	Kerala	Mumbai	Krishnagiri Stadium, Wayanad	Match Drawn Mumbai took first innings lead
39	3 November	Gujarat	Tamil Nadu	Lalbhai Contractor Stadium, Surat	Tamil Nadu Won by 8 Wickets
40	3 November	Mumbai	Haryana	Sharad Pawar Cricket Academy BKC, Mumbai	Mumbai Won by an innings and 131 Runs
51	11 November	Kerala	Tamil Nadu	Krishnagiri Stadium, Wayanad	Tamil Nadu Won by 189 Runs
52	11 November	Gujarat	Haryana	Sardar Patel Stadium, Valsad	Gujarat Won by 69 Runs

Elite Group C

Team	Pld	W	L	D	T	N/R	Pts	NRR
Karnataka	4	2	1	1	0	0	16	-0.129
Andhra	4	2	1	1	0	0	13	+0.182
Baroda	4	1	1	2	0	0	13	+0.240
Bengal	4	1	1	2	0	0	9	-0.100
Railways	4	0	2	2	0	0	4	-0.252

- Top two teams advanced to the knockout stage
- Last team relegated to Plate group 2018-19

No.	Date	Team 1	Team 2	Venue	Result
5	8 October	Andhra	Baroda	Dr P.V.G. Raju ACA Sports Complex, Vizianagaram	Match Drawn Baroda took first innings lead
6	8 October	Bengal	Railways	Bengal Cricket Academy Ground, Kalyani	Match Drawn Railways took first innings lead
17	15 October	Karnataka	Andhra	KSCA Stadium, Hubli	Andhra Won by 164 Runs
18	15 October	Baroda	Bengal	Motibaug Cricket Ground, Vadodara	Baroda Won by 10 Wickets
29	26 October	Karnataka	Railways	Alur Cricket Stadium-II, Alur	Karnataka Won by an innings and 116 Runs
30	26 October	Bengal	Andhra	Bengal Cricket Academy Ground, Kalyani	Bengal Won by an innings and 26 Runs
41	3 November	Railways	Baroda	Diesel Mechanical Works Cricket Ground, Patiala	Match Drawn Baroda took first innings lead
42	3 November	Karnataka	Bengal	KSCA Stadium, Belgaum	Match Drawn Karnataka took first innings lead
53	11 November	Railways	Andhra	New Delhi	Andhra Won by 116 Runs
54	11 November	Karnataka	Baroda	SDNRW Ground, Mysore	Karnataka Won by 9 Wickets

==== Plate Group ====
Plate Group A

Team	Pld	W	L	D	T	N/R	Pts	NRR
Rajasthan	5	3	0	2	0	0	24	+0.630
Saurashtra	5	2	0	3	0	0	19	+0.252
Tripura	5	3	2	0	0	0	18	-0.431
Assam	5	1	2	2	0	0	8	-0.341
Goa	5	0	3	2	0	0	6	-0.281
J & K	5	0	2	3	0	0	5	+0.177

- Top two teams advanced to the Plate knockout stage

No.	Date	Team 1	Team 2	Venue	Result
7	8 October	Assam	Rajasthan	Tinsukia District Sports Association Ground, Tinsukia	Rajasthan Won by 227 Runs
9	8 October	Saurashtra	Tripura	Saurashtra Cricket Association Stadium, Rajkot	Saurashtra Won by 7 Wickets
19	15 October	Tripura	Assam	D N Singha Stadium, Goalpara	Tripura Won by 161 Runs
20	15 October	Rajasthan	J & K	K L Saini Stadium, Jaipur	Match Drawn J & K took first innings lead
21	15 October	Saurashtra	Goa	Railway Cricket Ground, Rajkot	Saurashtra Won by 9 Wickets
31	26 October	Tripura	J & K	D N Singha Stadium, Goalpara	Tripura Won by 105 Runs
32	26 October	Goa	Rajasthan	Sanguem Cricket Ground, Sanguem	Rajasthan Won by an innings and 1 Run
33	26 October	Saurashtra	Assam	Railway Cricket Ground, Rajkot	Match Drawn Saurashtra took first innings lead
43	3 November	J & K	Assam	D N Singha Stadium, Goalpara	Assam Won by 5 Wickets
44	3 November	Goa	Tripura	Sanguem Cricket Ground, Sanguem	Tripura Won by 25 Runs
45	3 November	Rajasthan	Saurashtra	SMS Stadium, Jaipur	Match Drawn Rajasthan took first innings lead
55	11 November	Goa	Assam	Sanguem Cricket Ground, Sanguem	Match Drawn Goa took first innings lead
56	11 November	Rajasthan	Tripura	SMS Stadium, Jaipur	Rajasthan Won by an innings and 374 Runs
57	11 November	J & K	Saurashtra	Railway Cricket Ground, Rajkot	Match Drawn Saurashtra took first innings lead
71	17 November	Goa	J & K	J Narendranath ACA Cricket Ground, Perecherla	Match Drawn Goa took first innings lead

Plate Group B

Team	Pld	W	L	D	T	N/R	Pts	NRR
Hyderabad	5	2	0	3	0	0	21	+0.002
Madhya Pradesh	5	1	0	4	0	0	14	+0.472
Jharkhand	5	0	1	4	0	0	13	+0.397
Uttar Pradesh	5	0	1	4	0	0	10	-0.082
Chhattisgarh	5	0	0	5	0	0	7	-0.091
Odisha	5	0	2	3	0	0	3	-0.855

- Top two teams advanced to the Plate knockout stage

No.	Date	Team 1	Team 2	Venue	Result
10	8 October	Jharkhand	Uttar Pradesh	B S L Cricket Stadium., Bokaro	Match Drawn 1st innings unfinished
11	8 October	Odisha	Chhattisgarh	Gandhi Stadium, Balangir	Match Drawn Chhattisgarh took first innings lead
12	8 October	Madhya Pradesh	Hyderabad	Emerald Heights International School Ground, Indore	Match Drawn Hyderabad took first innings lead
22	15 October	Jharkhand	Hyderabad	Bokaro	Match Drawn Jharkhand took first innings lead
23	15 October	Chhattisgarh	Uttar Pradesh	B S P Cricket Stadium, Bhilai	Match Drawn Uttar Pradesh took first innings lead
24	15 October	Madhya Pradesh	Odisha	Holkar Stadium, Indore	Match Drawn Madhya Pradesh took first innings lead
34	26 October	Hyderabad	Chhattisgarh	Rajiv Gandhi International Stadium, Hyderabad	Match Drawn Hyderabad took first innings lead
35	26 October	Odisha	Uttar Pradesh	Veer Surendra Sai Stadium, Sambalpur	Match Drawn Uttar Pradesh took first innings lead
36	26 October	Madhya Pradesh	Jharkhand	Holkar Stadium, Indore	Madhya Pradesh Won by 9 Wickets
46	3 November	Jharkhand	Chhattisgarh	Keenan Stadium, Jamshedpur	Match Drawn Jharkhand took first innings lead
47	3 November	Hyderabad	Odisha	Gymkhana Ground, Hyderabad	Hyderabad Won by an innings and 59 Runs
48	3 November	Madhya Pradesh	Uttar Pradesh	Maharaja International School, Rewa	Match Drawn Uttar Pradesh took first innings lead
58	11 November	Jharkhand	Odisha	B S L Cricket Stadium., Bokaro	Jharkhand Won by 9 Wickets
59	11 November	Hyderabad	Uttar Pradesh	Hyderabad	Hyderabad Won by an innings and 116 Runs
60	11 November	Madhya Pradesh	Chhattisgarh	MPCA Cricket Ground, Sagar	Match Drawn Madhya Pradesh took first innings lead

==== Plate Knockout Stage ====
No.	Date	Team 1	Team 2	Venue	Result
Semi-finals
61	23 November	Rajasthan	Madhya Pradesh	Emerald Heights International School Ground, Indore	Rajasthan Won by 26 Runs (qualified to knockout stage) (Promoted to Elite Group 2018–19)
62	23 November	Saurashtra	Hyderabad	Gymkhana Ground, Hyderabad	Match Drawn Hyderabad took first innings lead (qualified to knockout stage) (Promoted to Elite Group 2018–19)
3rd Place
63	8 December	Madhya Pradesh	Saurashtra	Saurashtra Cricket ASsociation Stadium, Rajkot	Match Drawn Madhya Pradesh took first innings lead (Promoted to Elite Group 2018–19)

==== Knockout stage ====
No.	Date	Team 1	Team 2	Venue	Result
Quarter-finals
64	29 November	Tamil Nadu	Hyderabad	NPR College Ground, Dindigul	Match Abandoned Tamil Nadu Won by Spin of Coin
65	29 November	Delhi	Andhra	New Delhi	Delhi Won by an innings and 170 Runs
66	29 November	Mumbai	Rajasthan	Mumbai	Match Drawn Mumbai took first innings lead
67	29 November	Punjab	Karnataka	Patiala	Punjab Won by an innings and 2 Runs
Semi-finals
68	8 December	Punjab	Punjab	Dhruv Pandove Stadium, Patiala	Match Drawn Mumbai took first innings lead
69	8 December	Delhi	Tamil Nadu	Airforce Complex Ground, Palam, New Delhi	Delhi Won by an innings and 16 Runs
Final
70	17 December	Mumbai	Delhi	BKC Stadium, Mumbai	Delhi Won by 5 Wickets

=== New Zealand in India ===
ODI series
No.	Date	Home captain	Away captain	Venue	Result
ODI 3928	22 October	Virat Kohli	Kane Williamson	Wankhede Stadium, Mumbai	New Zealand by 6 wickets
ODI 3931	25 October	Virat Kohli	Kane Williamson	Maharashtra Cricket Association Stadium, Pune	India by 6 wickets
ODI 3932	29 October	Virat Kohli	Kane Williamson	Green Park Stadium, Kanpur	India by 6 runs
T20I series
No.	Date	Home captain	Away captain	Venue	Result
T20I 630	1 November	Virat Kohli	Kane Williamson	Feroz Shah Kotla Ground, Delhi	India by 53 runs
T20I 631	4 November	Virat Kohli	Kane Williamson	Saurashtra Cricket Association Stadium, Rajkot	New Zealand by 40 runs
T20I 632	7 November	Virat Kohli	Kane Williamson	Greenfield International Stadium, Thiruvananthapuram	India by 6 runs

=== Vinoo Mankad Trophy Inter Zonal League ===
Pos	Team	Mat	Won	Lost	Drawn	Tied	N/R	Net RR	For	Against	Pts
1	Central Zone	4	4	0	0	0	0	+0.574	828/178.3	813/200.0	16
2	North Zone	4	3	1	0	0	0	+0.218	979/196.4	937/196.5	12
3	East Zone	4	2	2	0	0	0	+0.052	698/200.0	628/182.4	8
4	West Zone	4	1	3	0	0	0	-0.184	858/197.4	905/200.0	4
5	South Zone	4	0	4	0	0	0	-0.547	774/200.0	854/193.2	0

Winner of Vinoo Mankad Trophy Inter Zonal League

Group stage
No.	Date	Team 1	Team 2	Venue	Result
1	24 October	Central Zone	West Zone	Alur Cricket Stadium-III, Alur	Central Zone Won by 5 Runs
2	24 October	North Zone	South Zone	Alur Cricket Stadium, Alur	North Zone Won by 28 Runs
3	25 October	North Zone	West Zone	Alur Cricket Stadium-III, Alur	North Zone Won by 13 Runs
4	25 October	Central Zone	East Zone	Alur Cricket Stadium, Alur	Central Zone Won by 7 Wickets
5	27 October	East Zone	South Zone	Alur Cricket Stadium, Alur	East Zone Won by 49 Runs
6	27 October	North Zone	Central Zone	Alur Cricket Stadium-III, Alur	Central Zone Won by 7 Wickets
7	28 October	South Zone	West Zone	Alur Cricket Stadium-III, Alur	West Zone Won by 4 Wickets
8	28 October	East Zone	North Zone	Alur Cricket Stadium, Alur	North Zone Won by 3 Wickets
9	30 October	East Zone	West Zone	Alur Cricket Stadium-III, Alur	East Zone Won by 30 Runs
10	30 October	South Zone	Central Zone	Alur Cricket Stadium, Alur	Central Zone Won by 2 Wickets

== November ==
=== Women's U-19 One Day league ===
==== Zonal Stage ====
South Zone

Pos	Team	Mat	Won	Lost	Drawn	Tied	N/R	Net RR	For	Against	Pts
1	Andhra	5	5	0	0	0	0	+2.099	943/219.1	551/250.0	20
2	Kerala	5	4	1	0	0	0	+0.363	618/211.0	612/238.3	16
3	Hyderabad	5	3	2	0	0	0	+0.953	896/226.4	692/230.4	12
4	Karnataka	5	2	3	0	0	0	-0.086	578/192.4	683/221.2	8
5	Tamil Nadu	5	1	4	0	0	0	-1.152	556/250.0	704/208.3	4
6	Goa	5	0	5	0	0	0	-2.354	621/250.0	970/200.3	0

Qualified for Super League

No.	Date	Team 1	Team 2	Venue	Result
1	1 November	Kerala	Hyderabad	J Narendranath ACA Cricket Ground, Perecherla	Kerala Won by 4 Runs
2	1 November	Andhra	Tamil Nadu	RVR & JC college ground, Guntur	Andhra Won by 158 Runs
3	1 November	Goa	Karnataka	JKC college ground, Guntur	Karnataka Won by 9 Wickets
10	2 November	Kerala	Tamil Nadu	RVR & JC college ground, Guntur	Kerala Won by 6 Wickets
11	2 November	Hyderabad	Goa	J Narendranath ACA Cricket Ground, Perecherla	Hyderabad Won by 106 Runs
12	2 November	Andhra	Karnataka	JKC college ground, Guntur	Andhra Won by 105 Runs
19	4 November	Andhra	Kerala	JKC college ground, Guntur	Andhra Won by 3 Wickets
20	4 November	Hyderabad	Karnataka	RVR & JC college ground, Guntur	Hyderabad Won by 7 Wickets
21	4 November	Goa	Tamil Nadu	J Narendranath ACA Cricket Ground, Perecherla	Tamil Nadu Won by 114 Runs
26	5 November	Andhra	Hyderabad	JKC college ground, Guntur	Andhra Won by 8 Wickets
27	5 November	Karnataka	Tamil Nadu	RVR & JC college ground, Guntur	Karnataka Won by 6 Wickets
28	5 November	Goa	Kerala	J Narendranath ACA Cricket Ground, Perecherla	Kerala Won by 7 Wickets
38	7 November	Andhra	Goa	J Narendranath ACA Cricket Ground, Perecherla	Andhra Won by 127 Runs
39	7 November	Kerala	Karnataka	JKC college ground, Guntur	Kerala Won by 6 Wickets
40	7 November	Tamil Nadu	Hyderabad	RVR & JC college ground, Guntur	Hyderabad Won by 102 Runs

West Zone

Pos	Team	Mat	Won	Lost	Drawn	Tied	N/R	Net RR	For	Against	Pts
1	Baroda	4	4	0	0	0	0	+2.388	746/163.3	435/200.0	16
2	Mumbai	4	3	1	0	0	0	+2.595	953/200.0	434/200.0	12
3	Maharashtra	4	2	2	0	0	0	+0.461	405/134.3	510/200.0	8
4	Gujarat	4	1	3	0	0	0	-2.547	312/200.0	575/140.0	4
5	Saurashtra	4	0	4	0	0	0	-3.279	267/200.0	729/158.0	0

Qualified for Super League

No.	Date	Team 1	Team 2	Venue	Result
04	1 November	Saurashtra	Baroda	Mgm Ground, Aurangabad	Baroda Won by 171 Runs
05	1 November	Mumbai	Gujarat	Aurangabad District Cricket Association Ground, Aurangabad	Mumbai Won by 262 Runs
13	2 November	Saurashtra	Gujarat	Mgm Ground, Aurangabad	Gujarat Won by 4 Runs
14	2 November	Baroda	Maharashtra	Aurangabad District Cricket Association Ground, Aurangabad	Baroda Won by 104 Runs
22	4 November	Baroda	Mumbai	Mgm Ground, Aurangabad	Baroda Won by 33 Runs
23	4 November	Saurashtra	Maharashtra	Aurangabad District Cricket Association Ground, Aurangabad	Maharashtra Won by 10 Wickets
29	5 November	Maharashtra	Gujarat	Mgm Ground, Aurangabad	Maharashtra Won by 8 Wickets
30	5 November	Saurashtra	Mumbai	Aurangabad District Cricket Association Ground, Aurangabad	Mumbai Won by 285 Runs
41	7 November	Maharashtra	Mumbai	Mgm Ground, Aurangabad	Mumbai Won by 5 Runs
42	7 November	Baroda	Gujarat	Aurangabad District Cricket Association Ground, Aurangabad	Baroda Won by 9 Wickets

East Zone

Pos	Team	Mat	Won	Lost	Drawn	Tied	N/R	Net RR	For	Against	Pts
1	Jharkhand	4	4	0	0	0	0	+1.339	477/140.2	412/200.0	16
2	Bengal	4	3	1	0	0	0	+0.597	424/144.5	418/179.2	12
3	Assam	4	2	2	0	0	0	-0.246	484/174.2	548/181.2	8
4	Odisha	4	1	3	0	0	0	-0.118	598/200.0	475/152.5	4
5	Tripura	4	0	4	0	0	0	-1.686	430/200.0	560/146.0	0

Qualified for Super League

No.	Date	Team 1	Team 2	Venue	Result
06	1 November	Jharkhand	Tripura	JSCA International Stadium Complex, Ranchi	Jharkhand Won by 8 Wickets
07	1 November	Bengal	Assam	JSCA Oval Ground, Ranchi	Bengal Won by 9 Wickets
15	3 November	Jharkhand	Assam	JSCA International Stadium Complex, Ranchi	Jharkhand Won by 62 Runs
16	3 November	Odisha	Tripura	JSCA Oval Ground, Ranchi	Odisha Won by 127 Runs
31	5 November	Jharkhand	Odisha	JSCA Oval Ground, Ranchi	Jharkhand Won by 7 Wickets
32	5 November	Bengal	Tripura	JSCA International Stadium Complex, Ranchi	Bengal Won by 4 Wickets
46	8 November	Jharkhand	Bengal	JSCA International Stadium Complex, Ranchi	Jharkhand Won by 8 Wickets
47	8 November	Assam	Odisha	JSCA Oval Ground, Ranchi	Assam Won by 5 Wickets
54	10 November	Assam	Tripura	JSCA Oval Ground, Ranchi	Assam Won by 9 Wickets
55	10 November	Bengal	Odisha	JSCA International Stadium Complex, Ranchi	Bengal Won by 9 Wickets

North Zone

Pos	Team	Mat	Won	Lost	Drawn	Tied	N/R	Net RR	For	Against	Pts
1	Delhi	4	4	0	0	0	0	+0.943	522/167.1	436/200.0	16
2	Punjab	4	3	1	0	0	0	+0.718	398/147.3	396/200.0	12
3	Himachal	4	2	2	0	0	0	+0.265	419/157.4	419/175.1	8
4	Haryana	4	1	3	0	0	0	+0.243	478/157.3	556/199.1	4
5	J & K	4	0	4	0	0	0	-3.760	275/200.0	285/55.3	0

Qualified for Super League

No.	Date	Team 1	Team 2	Venue	Result
08	1 November	Himachal	Delhi	PCPA Stadium, Santoshgarh	Delhi Won by 6 Wickets
09	1 November	Punjab	J & K	JNV School, Una	Punjab Won by 9 Wickets
17	3 November	Himachal	Haryana	PCPA Stadium, Santoshgarh	Himachal Won by 2 Wickets
18	3 November	Delhi	J & K	JNV School, Una	Delhi Won by 10 Wickets
33	5 November	Haryana	J & K	PCPA Stadium, Santoshgarh	Haryana Won by 10 Wickets
34	5 November	Delhi	Punjab	JNV School, Una	Delhi Won by 17 Runs
43	7 November	Punjab	Himachal	PCPA Stadium, Santoshgarh	Punjab Won by 10 Wickets
44	7 November	Haryana	Delhi	JNV School, Una	Delhi Won by 67 Runs
50	9 November	Punjab	Haryana	JNV School, Una	Punjab Won by 15 Runs
51	9 November	Himachal	J & K	PCPA Stadium, Santoshgarh	Himachal Won by 10 Wickets

Central Zone

Pos	Team	Mat	Won	Lost	Drawn	Tied	N/R	Net RR	For	Against	Pts
1	Uttar Pradesh	4	4	0	0	0	0	+2.078	900/183.0	568/200.0	16
2	Rajasthan	4	2	2	0	0	0	+0.448	659/183.3	613/195.0	8
3	Madhya Pradesh	4	2	2	0	0	0	+0.137	476/175.3	515/200.0	8
4	Chhattisgarh	4	2	2	0	0	0	+0.009	670/200.0	573/171.3	8
5	Vidarbha	4	0	4	0	0	0	-2.841	511/200.0	947/175.3	0

Qualified for Super League

No.	Date	Team 1	Team 2	Venue	Result
24	4 November	Uttar Pradesh	Madhya Pradesh	Kamla Club Ground, Kanpur	Uttar Pradesh Won by 88 Runs
25	4 November	Rajasthan	Vidarbha	Green Park Stadium, Kanpur	Rajasthan Won by 136 Runs
35	5 November	Uttar Pradesh	Vidarbha	Kamla Club Ground, Kanpur	Uttar Pradesh Won by 237 Runs
36	5 November	Madhya Pradesh	Chhattisgarh	Green Park Stadium, Kanpur	Chhattisgarh Won by 41 Runs
37	6 November	Chhattisgarh	Rajasthan	Green Park Stadium, Kanpur	Rajasthan Won by 10 Wickets
45	7 November	Madhya Pradesh	Vidarbha	Kamla Club Ground, Kanpur	Madhya Pradesh Won by 8 Wickets
48	8 November	Madhya Pradesh	Rajasthan	Kamla Club Ground, Kanpur	Madhya Pradesh Won by 86 Runs
49	8 November	Uttar Pradesh	Chhattisgarh	Green Park Stadium, Kanpur	Uttar Pradesh Won by 10 Wickets
52	9 November	Chhattisgarh	Vidarbha	Kamla Club Ground, Kanpur	Chhattisgarh Won by 59 Runs
53	9 November	Uttar Pradesh	Rajasthan	Green Park Stadium, Kanpur	Uttar Pradesh Won by 3 Wickets

North East and Bihar

Pos	Team	Mat	Won	Lost	Drawn	Tied	N/R	Net RR	For	Against	Pts
1	Bihar	5	5	0	0	0	0	+4.423	1235/212.4	346/250.0	20
2	Nagaland	5	4	1	0	0	0	+1.924	713/211.3	344/237.4	16
3	Arunachal	5	3	2	0	0	0	+0.584	529/206.5	368/186.3	12
4	Sikkim	5	1	4	0	0	0	-1.701	344/224.5	791/244.5	4
5	Manipur	5	1	4	0	0	0	-2.489	452/244.5	927/213.5	4
6	Meghalaya	5	1	4	0	0	0	-2.947	255/213.5	752/181.4	4

Qualified for Super League

No.	Date	Team 1	Team 2	Venue	Result
79	1 November	Meghalaya	Sikkim	TATA Digwadih Stadium, Dhanbad	Sikkim Won by 5 Wickets
80	1 November	Bihar	Arunachal	Railway Stadium, Dhanbad	Bihar Won by 6 Wickets
81	1 November	Manipur	Nagaland	Jawaharlal Nehru Stadium, Jealgora, Dhanbad	Nagaland Won by 117 Runs
82	3 November	Arunachal	Meghalaya	Jawaharlal Nehru Stadium, Jealgora, Dhanbad	Arunachal Won by 9 Wickets
83	3 November	Nagaland	Sikkim	Railway Stadium, Dhanbad	Nagaland Won by 120 Runs
84	3 November	Bihar	Manipur	TATA Digwadih Stadium, Dhanbad	Bihar Won by 274 Runs
85	5 November	Meghalaya	Manipur	Jawaharlal Nehru Stadium, Jealgora, Dhanbad	Meghalaya Won by 6 Wickets
86	5 November	Arunachal	Sikkim	Railway Stadium, Dhanbad	Arunachal Won by 80 Runs
87	5 November	Nagaland	Bihar	TATA Digwadih Stadium, Dhanbad	Bihar Won by 3 Wickets
88	7 November	Meghalaya	Bihar	Railway Stadium, Dhanbad	Bihar Won by 366 Runs
89	7 November	Manipur	Sikkim	TATA Digwadih Stadium, Dhanbad	Manipur Won by 2 Wickets
90	7 November	Nagaland	Arunachal	Jawaharlal Nehru Stadium, Jealgora, Dhanbad	Nagaland Won by 8 Wickets
91	9 November	Bihar	Sikkim	Jawaharlal Nehru Stadium, Jealgora, Dhanbad	Bihar Won by 247 Runs
92	9 November	Nagaland	Meghalaya	Railway Stadium, Dhanbad	Nagaland Won by 132 Runs
93	9 November	Manipur	Arunachal	TATA Digwadih Stadium, Dhanbad	Arunachal Won by 81 Runs

==== Super League Stage ====
Super League Group A

Pos	Team	Mat	Won	Lost	Drawn	Tied	N/R	Net RR	For	Against	Pts
1	Andhra	5	5	0	0	0	0	+1.149	474/165.2	402/234.0	20
2	Rajasthan	5	4	1	0	0	0	+0.405	516/192.4	511/224.5	16
3	Baroda	5	3	2	0	0	0	+0.399	575/207.0	570/239.4	12
4	Bengal	5	2	3	0	0	0	+0.494	553/206.4	507/232.2	8
5	Punjab	5	1	4	0	0	0	-0.214	724/233.0	728/219.1	4
6	Bihar	5	0	5	0	0	0	-3.243	289/238.0	413/92.4	0

Qualified for knockout stage

No.	Date	Team 1	Team 2	Venue	Result
56	15 November	Punjab	Andhra	Keenan Stadium, Jamshedpur	Andhra Won by 6 Wickets (VJD Method)
57	15 November	Bengal	Baroda	Shaheed Nirmal Mahato Stadium, Jamshedpur	Baroda Won by 53 Runs
58	16 November	Rajasthan	Bihar	Keenan Stadium, Jamshedpur	Rajasthan Won by 9 Wickets
60	17 November	Punjab	Bengal	Shaheed Nirmal Mahato Stadium, Jamshedpur	Bengal Won by 100 Runs
61	17 November	Andhra	Gujarat	Keenan Stadium, Jamshedpur	Andhra Won by 8 Wickets
62	18 November	Baroda	Bihar	Keenan Stadium, Jamshedpur	Baroda Won by 8 Wickets
64	19 November	Punjab	Bihar	Shaheed Nirmal Mahato Stadium, Jamshedpur	Punjab Won by 119 Runs
65	19 November	Andhra	Bengal	Keenan Stadium, Jamshedpur	Andhra Won by 5 Wickets
66	20 November	Rajasthan	Baroda	Keenan Stadium, Jamshedpur	Rajasthan Won by 4 Wickets
68	21 November	Punjab	Baroda	Keenan Stadium, Jamshedpur	Baroda Won by 21 Runs
69	21 November	Andhra	Bihar	Shaheed Nirmal Mahato Stadium, Jamshedpur	Andhra Won by 9 Wickets
70	22 November	Rajasthan	Bengal	Shaheed Nirmal Mahato Stadium, Jamshedpur	Rajasthan Won by 8 Wickets
72	22 November	Andhra	Baroda	Keenan Stadium, Jamshedpur	Andhra Won by 67 Runs
73	23 November	Punjab	Rajasthan	Keenan Stadium, Jamshedpur	Rajasthan Won by 5 Wickets
74	24 November	Bengal	Bihar	Keenan Stadium, Jamshedpur	Bengal Won by 9 Wickets

Super League Group B

Pos	Team	Mat	Won	Lost	Drawn	Tied	N/R	Net RR	For	Against	Pts
1	Mumbai	5	5	0	0	0	0	+1.922	834/165.2	545/250.0	20
2	Jharkhand	5	4	1	0	0	0	+0.851	831/241.0	626/241.0	16
3	Uttar Pradesh	5	3	2	0	0	0	+0.935	599/171.0	642/250.0	12
4	Kerala	5	2	3	0	0	0	-0.075	409/192.5	481/219.0	8
5	Delhi	5	1	4	0	0	0	+0.073	642/196.2	737/230.3	4
6	Nagaland	5	0	5	0	0	0	-6.170	149/250.0	433/64.0	0

Qualified for knockout stage

No.	Date	Team 1	Team 2	Venue	Result
59	16 November	Delhi	Kerala	JKC College Ground, Guntur	Kerala Won by 5 Wickets
94	16 November	Jharkhand	Mumbai	RVR & JC College Ground, Guntur	Mumbai Won by 96 Runs
95	16 November	Uttar Pradesh	Nagaland	J Narendranath ACA Cricket Ground, Perecherla	Uttar Pradesh Won by 10 Wickets
63	18 November	Delhi	Uttar Pradesh	JKC College Ground, Guntur	Uttar Pradesh Won by 6 Wickets
96	18 November	Mumbai	Nagaland	RVR & JC College Ground, Guntur	Mumbai Won by 10 Wickets
97	18 November	Jharkhand	Kerala	J Narendranath ACA Cricket Ground, Perecherla	Jharkhand Won by 1 Wicket
67	20 November	Delhi	Nagaland	JKC College Ground, Guntur	Delhi Won by 10 Wickets
98	20 November	Uttar Pradesh	Jharkhand	RVR & JC College Ground, Guntur	Jharkhand Won by 22 Runs
99	20 November	Kerala	Mumbai	J Narendranath ACA Cricket Ground, Perecherla	Mumbai Won by 74 Runs
71	22 November	Uttar Pradesh	Kerala	JKC College Ground, Guntur	Uttar Pradesh Won by 10 Wickets
100	22 November	Jharkhand	Nagaland	RVR & JC College Ground, Guntur	Jharkhand Won by 10 Wickets
101	22 November	Delhi	Mumbai	J Narendranath ACA Cricket Ground, Perecherla	Mumbai Won by 86 Runs
75	24 November	Kerala	Nagaland	JKC College Ground, Guntur	Kerala Won by 10 Wickets
102	24 November	Delhi	Jharkhand	RVR & JC College Ground, Guntur	Jharkhand Won by 10 Runs
103	24 November	Uttar Pradesh	Mumbai	J Narendranath ACA Cricket Ground, Perecherla	Mumbai Won by 29 Runs

==== Knockout stage ====
No.	Date	Team 1	Team 2	Venue	Result
Semi-finals
76	28 November	Andhra	Jharkhand	JKC College Ground, Guntur	Andhra Won by 15 Runs
77	28 November	Rajasthan	Mumbai	J Narendranath ACA Cricket Ground, Perecherla	Mumbai Won by 155 Runs
Final
78	30 November	Andhra	Mumbai	JKC College Ground, Guntur	Andhra Won by 47 Runs

=== Cooch Behar Trophy ===
==== Group stage ====
Group A

Team	Pld	W	L	D	A	Pts	NRR
Delhi	6	4	0	2	0	31	+0.549
Punjab	6	4	2	0	0	27	+0.619
Chhattisgarh	6	3	1	2	0	21	+0.256
Jharkhand	6	3	3	0	0	19	-0.049
Tamil Nadu	6	2	1	3	0	19	+0.402
Saurashtra	6	0	5	1	0	3	–0.704
Odisha	6	0	5	1	0	2	–1.122

- Top two teams advanced to the knockout stage

No.	Date	Team 1	Team 2	Venue	Result
1	5 November	Jharkhand	Delhi	B S L Cricket Stadium., Bokaro	Delhi Won by 8 Wickets
2	5 November	Punjab	Tamil Nadu	Dhruv Pandove Stadium, Patiala	Punjab Won by 5 Wickets
3	5 November	Odisha	Saurashtra	Ravenshaw University Ground, Cuttack	Match Drawn Saurashtra took first innings lead
13	12 November	Chhattisgarh	Delhi	Sector 10 Ground, Raipur	Match Drawn Delhi took first innings lead
14	12 November	Jharkhand	Punjab	JSCA International Stadium Complex, Ranchi	Punjab Won by 10 Wickets
15	12 November	Tamil Nadu	Saurashtra	NPR College Ground, Dindigul	Tamil Nadu Won by 8 Wickets
25	19 November	Chhattisgarh	Odisha	B S P Cricket Stadium, Bhilai	Chhattisgarh Won by 10 Wickets
26	19 November	Delhi	Punjab	New Delhi	Delhi Won by 8 Wickets
27	19 November	Jharkhand	Tamil Nadu	B S L Cricket Stadium, Bokaro	Tamil Nadu Won by 4 Wickets
37	8 December	Punjab	Odisha	Gandhi Ground, Amritsar	Punjab Won by an innings and 125 Runs
38	8 December	Delhi	Tamil Nadu	St. Stephens' Ground, New Delhi	Match Drawn Delhi took first innings lead
39	8 December	Saurashtra	Chhattisgarh	Railway Cricket Ground, Rajkot	Chhattisgarh Won by 9 Wickets
49	17 December	Chhattisgarh	Tamil Nadu	Shaheed Veer Narayan Singh International Stadium, Raipur	Match Drawn Tamil Nadu took first innings lead
50	17 December	Delhi	Saurashtra	St. Stephens' Ground, New Delhi	Delhi Won by an innings and 73 Runs
51	17 December	Odisha	Jharkhand	Vikas Ground, Bargarh	Jharkhand Won by 194 Runs
61	25 December	Chhattisgarh	Punjab	Shaheed Veer Narayan Singh International Stadium, Raipur	Chhattisgarh Won by 8 Wickets
62	25 December	Tamil Nadu	Odisha	TNCA Academy, Theni	Match Drawn Tamil Nadu took first innings lead
63	25 December	Saurashtra	Jharkhand	Railway Cricket Ground, Rajkot	Jharkhand Won by an innings and 204 Runs
73	2 January	Odisha	Delhi	Barabati Stadium, Cuttack	Delhi Won by 253 Runs
74	2 January	Jharkhand	Chhattisgarh	Railway Stadium, Dhanbad	Jharkhand Won by 7 Wickets
75	2 January	Punjab	Saurashtra	Dhruv Pandove Stadium, Patiala	Punjab Won by an innings and 192 Runs

Group B

Team	Pld	W	L	D	A	Pts	NRR
Karnataka	6	4	0	2	0	31	+0.498
Madhya Pradesh	6	4	0	2	0	30	+0.969
Gujarat	6	4	1	1	0	27	+0.440
Mumbai	6	2	2	2	0	18	+0.389
Andhra	6	2	3	1	0	16	+0.384
Assam	6	1	5	0	0	6	–1.117
Railways	6	0	6	0	0	0	–0.659

- Top two teams advanced to the knockout stage

No.	Date	Team 1	Team 2	Venue	Result
4	5 November	Assam	Madhya Pradesh	Mangaldai Sports Association Stadium, Mangaldai	Madhya Pradesh Won by an innings and 100 Runs
5	5 November	Mumbai	Gujarat	Sachin Tendulkar Gymkhana, Kandivili, Mumbai	Gujarat Won by 202 Runs
6	5 November	Karnataka	Andhra	Alur Cricket Stadium-III, Alur	Karnataka Won by 10 Wickets
16	12 November	Assam	Railways	Jalan Outdoor Stadium, Dibrugarh	Assam Won by 3 Wickets
17	12 November	Gujarat	Madhya Pradesh	Shambhubhai V Patel Stadium, Nadiad	Madhya Pradesh Won by 10 Wickets
18	12 November	Andhra	Mumbai	Dr P.V.G. Raju ACA Sports Complex, Vizianagaram	Match Drawn Andhra took first innings lead
28	19 November	Karnataka	Railways	KSCA Navale Stadium, Shimoga	Karnataka Won by an innings and 124 Runs
29	19 November	Assam	Gujarat	Jalan Outdoor Stadium, Dibrugarh	Gujarat Won by 3 Wickets
30	19 November	Mumbai	Madhya Pradesh	Sharad Pawar Cricket Academy BKC, Mumbai	Match Drawn Mumbai took first innings lead
40	8 December	Karnataka	Gujarat	SNDRW Ground, Mysore	Match Drawn Gujarat took first innings lead
41	8 December	Mumbai	Assam	Sharad Pawar Cricket Academy BKC, Mumbai	Mumbai Won by an innings and 154 Runs
42	8 December	Railways	Andhra	Karnail Singh Stadium, New Delhi	Andhra Won by an innings and 98 Runs
52	17 December	Mumbai	Railways	Sachin Tendulkar Gymkhana, Kandivili, Mumbai	Mumbai Won by an innings and 103 Runs
53	17 December	Andhra	Assam	CSR Sharma College Ground, Ongole	Andhra Won by 257 Runs
54	17 December	Madhya Pradesh	Karnataka	Emerald Heights International School Ground, Indore	Match Drawn Karnataka took first innings lead
64	25 December	Gujarat	Railways	Sardar Patel Stadium, Valsad	Gujarat Won by 7 Wickets
65	25 December	Mumbai	Karnataka	Sharad Pawar Cricket Academy BKC, Mumbai	Karnataka Won by 8 Wickets
66	25 December	Andhra	Madhya Pradesh	CSR Sharma College Ground, Ongole	Madhya Pradesh Won by an innings and 43 Runs
76	2 January	Karnataka	Assam	KSCA Navale Stadium, Shimoga	Karnataka Won by an innings and 187 Runs
77	2 January	Madhya Pradesh	Railways	MPCA Cricket Ground, Sagar	Madhya Pradesh Won by an innings and 266 Runs
78	2 January	Andhra	Gujarat	Dr P.V.G. Raju ACA Sports Complex, Vizianagaram	Gujarat Won by 8 Wickets

Group C

Team	Pld	W	L	D	A	Pts	NRR
Maharashtra	6	3	0	3	0	28	+0.793
Bengal	6	3	0	3	0	26	+0.630
Haryana	6	3	1	2	0	24	+0.391
Baroda	6	2	2	2	0	17	+0.669
Rajasthan	6	2	2	2	0	17	-0.255
Goa	6	0	5	1	0	3	–0.926
Kerala	6	0	3	3	0	3	–1.219

- Top two teams advanced to the knockout stage

No.	Date	Team 1	Team 2	Venue	Result
7	5 November	Bengal	Baroda	JU Second Campus, Salt Lake, Kolkata	Bengal Won by 7 Wickets
8	5 November	Haryana	Kerala	Sehwag International School, Jhajjar	Haryana Won by 169 Runs
9	5 November	Goa	Rajasthan	Goa	Rajasthan Won by 43 Runs
19	12 November	Maharashtra	Bengal	Deccan Gymkhana Cricket Ground, Pune	Match Drawn Bengal took first innings lead
20	12 November	Kerala	Baroda	S D College, Alappuzah	Match Drawn Baroda took first innings lead
21	12 November	Haryana	Goa	Sehwag International School, Jhajjar	Haryana Won by an innings and 125 Runs
31	19 November	Maharashtra	Rajasthan	MCA Cricket Stadium, Gahunje, Pune	Match Drawn Maharashtra took first innings lead
32	19 November	Kerala	Bengal	S D College, Alappuzah	Bengal Won by an innings and 29 Runs
33	19 November	Haryana	Baroda	Sehwag International School, Jhajjar	Match Drawn Haryana took first innings lead
43	8 December	Rajasthan	Kerala	K L Saini Stadium, Jaipur	Rajasthan Won by an innings and 48 Runs
44	8 December	Haryana	Bengal	Chaudhry Bansi Lal Cricket Stadium, Lahli	Match Drawn Bengal took first innings lead
45	8 December	Maharashtra	Goa	MCA Cricket Stadium, Gahunje, Pune	Maharashtra Won by 10 Wickets
55	17 December	Haryana	Maharashtra	Chaudhry Bansi Lal Cricket Stadium, Lahli	Maharashtra Won by an innings and 54 Runs
56	17 December	Bengal	Goa	JU Second Campus, Salt Lake, Kolkata	Bengal Won by 8 Wickets
57	17 December	Baroda	Rajasthan	Reliance Cricket Stadium, Vadodara	Baroda Won by 73 Runs
67	25 December	Maharashtra	Kerala	MCA Cricket Stadium, Gahunje, Pune	Match Drawn Maharashtra took first innings lead
68	25 December	Rajasthan	Haryana	Sawai Mansingh Stadium, Jaipur	Haryana Won by an innings and 157 Runs
69	25 December	Goa	Baroda	Goa Cricket Association Academy, Porvorim	Baroda Won by an innings and 74 Runs
79	2 January	Rajasthan	Bengal	SMS Stadium, Jaipur	Match Drawn Rajasthan took first innings lead
80	2 January	Maharashtra	Baroda	MCA Cricket Stadium, Gahunje, Pune	Maharashtra Won by an innings and 34 Runs
81	2 January	Goa	Kerala	Goa Cricket Association Academy, Porvorim	Match Drawn Goa took first innings lead

Group D

Team	Pld	W	L	D	A	Pts	NRR
Uttar Pradesh	6	4	0	2	0	31	+0.523
Vidarbha	6	3	0	3	0	30	+0.591
Himachal	6	4	1	1	0	27	+1.186
Hyderabad	6	2	1	3	0	19	+0.242
Tripura	6	1	3	2	0	10	-0.822
J & K	6	1	5	0	0	7	–1.190
A and A Team	6	0	5	1	0	1	–1.109

- Top two teams advanced to the knockout stage

No.	Date	Team 1	Team 2	Venue	Result
10	5 November	Himachal	Uttar Pradesh	Atal Bihari Vajpayee Cricket Stadium, Amtar	Uttar Pradesh Won by 26 Runs
11	5 November	Hyderabad	Vidarbha	Rajiv Gandhi International Stadium, Hyderabad	Match Drawn Vidarbha took first innings lead
12	5 November	J & K	Tripura	Nagaland Cricket Stadium, Sovima	Tripura Won by 6 Wickets
22	12 November	Himachal	A and A	Atal Bihari Vajpayee Cricket Stadium, Amtar	Himachal Won by an innings and 387 Runs
23	12 November	Vidarbha	Uttar Pradesh	VCA Ground, Nagpur	Match Drawn Vidarbha took first innings lead
24	12 November	Hyderabad	Tripura	Gymkhana Ground, Hyderabad	Match Drawn Hyderabad took first innings lead
34	19 November	J & K	A and A	MCA Cricket Ground, Polo Ground, Shillong	J & K Won by an innings and 64 Runs
35	19 November	Vidarbha	Himachal	VCA Ground, Nagpur	Match Drawn Vidarbha took first innings lead
36	19 November	Hyderabad	Uttar Pradesh	Gymkhana Ground, Hyderabad	Match Drawn Uttar Pradesh took first innings lead
46	8 December	J & K	Vidarbha	VCA Ground, Nagpur	Vidarbha Won by 10 Wickets
47	8 December	Himachal	Hyderabad	Atal Bihari Vajpayee Cricket Stadium, Amtar	Himachal Won by 122 Runs
48	8 December	Tripura	A and A	Agartala	Match Drawn Tripura took first innings lead
58	17 December	A and A	Hyderabad	Rajiv Gandhi International Stadium, Hyderabad	Hyderabad Won by an innings and 325 Runs
59	17 December	Himachal	Tripura	Atal Bihari Vajpayee Cricket Stadium, Amtar	Himachal Won by 345 Runs
60	17 December	Uttar Pradesh	J & K	Bhamashah Park Ground, Meerut	Uttar Pradesh Won by an innings and 57 Runs
70	25 December	Vidarbha	A and A	VCA Ground, Nagpur	Vidarbha Won by an innings and 208 Runs
71	25 December	Hyderabad	J & K	Gymkhana Ground, Hyderabad	Hyderabad Won by an innings and 123 Runs
72	25 December	Uttar Pradesh	Tripura	Jawaharlal Nehru Stadium, Ghaziabad	Uttar Pradesh Won by an innings and 68 Runs
82	2 January	J & K	Himachal	Atal Bihari Vajpayee Cricket Stadium, Amtar	Himachal Won by an innings and 233 Runs
83	2 January	Uttar Pradesh	A and A	Chaudhary Charan Singh Sports Stadium, Muzzafarnagar	Uttar Pradesh Won by an innings and 266 Runs
84	2 January	Tripura	Vidarbha	Maharaja Bir Bikram College Stadium, Agartala	Vidarbha Won by an innings and 1 Run

==== Knockout stage ====
No.	Date	Team 1	Team 2	Venue	Result
Quarter-finals
85	11 January	Delhi	Uttar Pradesh	Green Park Stadium, Kanpur	Match Drawn Uttar Pradesh took first innings lead
86	11 January	Madhya Pradesh	Bengal	Holkar Stadium, Indore	Match Drawn Madhya Pradesh took first innings lead
87	11 January	Punjab	Maharashtra	Dhruv Pandove Stadium, Patiala	Punjab Won by 492 Runs
88	11 January	Vidarbha	Karnataka	VCA Ground, Nagpur	Vidarbha Won by 9 Wickets
Semi-finals
89	19 January	Uttar Pradesh	Madhya Pradesh	Green Park Stadium, Kanpur	Match Drawn Madhya Pradesh took first innings lead
90	19 January	Vidarbha	Punjab	VCA Ground, Nagpur	Match Drawn Vidarbha took first innings lead
Final
91	28 January	Madhya Pradesh	Vidarbha	VCA Ground, Nagpur	Match Drawn Vidarbha took first innings lead

=== Sri Lanka in India ===
Test series
No.	Date	Home captain	Away captain	Venue	Result
1st Test	16–20 November	Virat Kohli	Dinesh Chandimal	Eden Gardens, Kolkata	Match drawn
2nd Test	24–28 November	Virat Kohli	Dinesh Chandimal	Vidarbha Cricket Association Stadium, Nagpur	India won by an innings and 239 runs
3rd Test	2–6 December	Virat Kohli	Dinesh Chandimal	Feroz Shah Kotla Ground, Delhi	Match drawn
ODI series
No.	Date	Home captain	Away captain	Venue	Result
1st ODI	10 December	Rohit Sharma	Thisara Perera	Himachal Pradesh Cricket Association Stadium, Dharamshala	Sri Lanka won by 7 wickets
2nd ODI	13 December	Rohit Sharma	Thisara Perera	Punjab Cricket Association IS Bindra Stadium, Mohali	India won by 141 runs
3rd ODI	17 December	Rohit Sharma	Thisara Perera	Dr. Y.S. Rajasekhara Reddy ACA-VDCA Cricket Stadium, Visakhapatnam	India won by 8 wickets
T20I series
No.	Date	Home captain	Away captain	Venue	Result
1st T20I	20 December	Rohit Sharma	Thisara Perera	Barabati Stadium, Cuttack	India won by 93 runs
2nd T20I	22 December	Rohit Sharma	Thisara Perera	Holkar Stadium, Indore	India won by 88 runs
3rd T20I	24 December	Rohit Sharma	Thisara Perera	Wankhede Stadium, Mumbai	India won by 5 wickets

=== Men's U-19 Challenger Trophy ===
Pos	Team	Mat	Won	Lost	Drawn	Tied	N/R	Net RR	Pts
1	India Blue	3	2	1	0	0	0	+0.444	9
2	Sri Lanka BP XI	3	2	1	0	0	0	-0.345	8
3	India Red	3	1	2	0	0	0	+0.245	5
4	India Green	3	1	2	0	0	0	-0.361	5

advanced to Finals

No.	Date	Team 1	Team 2	Venue	Result
Group stage
1	26 November	India Red	India Blue	Cricket Club of India, Mumbai	India Blue Won by 39 Runs
2	26 November	India Green	Sri Lanka BP XI	BKC Ground, Mumbai	India Green Won by 7 Wickets
3	28 November	India Blue	India Green	BKC Ground, Mumbai	India Blue Won by 4 Wickets
4	28 November	India Red	Sri Lanka BP XI	Cricket Club of India, Mumbai	Sri Lanka BP XI Won by 4 Wickets
5	30 November	India Blue	Sri Lanka BP XI	BKC Ground, Mumbai	Sri Lanka BP XI Won by 6 Wickets
6	30 November	India Red	India Green	Cricket Club of India, Mumbai	India Red Won by 87 Runs
3rd Place
7	2 December	India Red	India Green	Wankhede Stadium, Mumbai	India Green Won by 21 Runs
Final
8	2 December	India Blue	Sri Lanka BP XI	Cricket Club of India, Mumbai	India Blue Won by 95 Runs

== December ==
=== Women's One Day League ===
==== Elite Group ====
Elite Group A

Team	Pld	W	L	D	T	N/R	Pts	NRR
Railways	4	4	0	0	0	0	16	+0.647
Andhra	4	3	1	0	0	0	12	+0.454
Hyderabad	4	1	3	0	0	0	4	-0.175
Himachal	4	1	3	0	0	0	4	-0.372
Madhya Pradesh	4	1	3	0	0	0	4	-0.460

- Top two teams advanced to the Elite Super League
- Last team relegated to Plate group 2018-19

No.	Date	Team 1	Team 2	Venue	Result
1	6 December	Railways	Madhya Pradesh	RRC Stadium, Hyderabad	Railways Won by 6 Wickets
2	6 December	Andhra	Hyderabad	AOC Cricket Stadium, Hyderabad	Andhra Won by 51 Runs
13	8 December	Madhya Pradesh	Himachal	Rajiv Gandhi International Cricket Stadium, Hyderabad	Madhya Pradesh Won by 51 Runs
14	8 December	Railways	Hyderabad	AOC Cricket Stadium, Hyderabad	Railways Won by 6 Runs
25	10 December	Andhra	Himachal	RRC Stadium, Hyderabad	Andhra Won by 5 Wickets
26	10 December	Hyderabad	Madhya Pradesh	AOC Cricket Stadium, Hyderabad	Hyderabad Won by 25 Runs
37	12 December	Andhra	Railways	RRC Stadium, Hyderabad	Railways Won by 6 Wickets
38	12 December	Himachal	Hyderabad	AOC Cricket Stadium, Hyderabad	Himachal Won by 6 Wickets
49	14 December	Andhra	Madhya Pradesh	AOC Cricket Stadium, Hyderabad	Andhra Won by 54 Runs
50	14 December	Himachal	Railways	RRC Stadium, Hyderabad	Railways Won by 5 Wickets

Elite Group B

Team	Pld	W	L	D	T	N/R	Pts	NRR
Delhi	4	3	1	0	0	0	12	-0.055
Mumbai	4	2	2	0	0	0	8	+0.626
Baroda	4	2	2	0	0	0	8	+0.136
Maharashtra	4	2	2	0	0	0	8	-0.118
Uttar Pradesh	4	1	3	0	0	0	4	-0.476

- Top two teams advanced to the Elite Super League
- Last team relegated to Plate group 2018-19

No.	Date	Team 1	Team 2	Venue	Result
72	7 December	Maharashtra	Delhi	GSFC Cricket Ground, Vadodara	Maharashtra Won by 36 Runs
73	7 December	Mumbai	Baroda	Reliance Cricket Stadium, Vadodara	Mumbai Won by 9 Wickets
15	8 December	Uttar Pradesh	Maharashtra	Reliance Cricket Stadium, Vadodara	Uttar Pradesh Won by 72 Runs
16	8 December	Baroda	Delhi	GSFC Cricket Ground, Vadodara	Delhi Won by 1 Run
27	10 December	Uttar Pradesh	Mumbai	GSFC Cricket Stadium, Vadodara	Mumbai Won by 9 Wickets
28	10 December	Maharashtra	Baroda	Reliance Cricket Stadium, Vadodara	Baroda Won by 4 Wickets
39	12 December	Mumbai	Delhi	Reliance Cricket Stadium, Vadodara	Delhi Won by 6 Wickets
40	12 December	Baroda	Uttar Pradesh	GSFC Cricket Ground, Vadodara	Baroda Won by 7 Wickets
51	14 December	Mumbai	Maharashtra	GSFC Cricket Ground, Vadodara	Maharashtra Won by 21 Runs
52	14 December	Uttar Pradesh	Delhi	Reliance Cricket Stadium, Vadodara	Delhi Won by 6 Wickets

==== Plate Group ====
Plate Group A

Team	Pld	W	L	D	T	N/R	Pts	NRR
Karnataka	5	3	1	0	0	1	14	+0.453
Haryana	5	3	1	0	0	1	14	+0.273
Saurashtra	5	3	1	0	0	1	14	-0.209
Punjab	5	1	3	0	0	1	6	-0.177
Tamil Nadu	5	1	3	0	0	1	6	-0.189
Odisha	5	1	3	0	0	1	6	-0.189

- Advanced to the Plate Semi-finals
- Advanced to the Plate Quarter-finals

No.	Date	Team 1	Team 2	Venue	Result
5	6 December	Haryana	Saurashtra	DRIEMS Ground, Cuttack	Haryana Won by 10 Wickets
6	6 December	Karnataka	Tamil Nadu	Nimpur Ground, Cuttack	Karnataka Won by 6 Wickets
7	6 December	Odisha	Punjab	Ravenshaw University Ground, Cuttack	Odisha Won by 43 Runs
17	8 December	Odisha	Saurashtra	Nimpur Ground, Cuttack	Match Abandoned
18	8 December	Karnataka	Haryana	Ravenshaw University Ground, Cuttack	Match Abandoned
19	8 December	Punjab	Tamil Nadu	DRIEMS Ground, Cuttack	Match Abandoned
29	10 December	Karnataka	Odisha	Ravenshaw University Ground, Cuttack	Karnataka Won by 75 Runs
30	10 December	Haryana	Tamil Nadu	DRIEMS Ground, Cuttack	Haryana Won by 7 Wickets
31	10 December	Punjab	Saurashtra	Nimpur Ground, Cuttack	Saurashtra Won by 3 Wickets
41	12 December	Karnataka	Saurashtra	DRIEMS Ground, Cuttack	Saurashtra Won by 2 Wickets
42	12 December	Tamil Nadu	Odisha	Nimpur Ground, Cuttack	Tamil Nadu Won by 2 Wickets
43	12 December	Haryana	Punjab	Ravenshaw University Ground, Cuttack	Punjab Won by 19 Runs
53	14 December	Tamil Nadu	Saurashtra	Nimpur Ground, Cuttack	Saurashtra Won by 3 Wickets
54	14 December	Odisha	Haryana	Ravenshaw University Ground, Cuttack	Haryana Won by 2 Wickets
55	14 December	Karnataka	Punjab	DRIEMS Ground, Cuttack	Karnataka Won by 4 Wickets

Plate Group B

Team	Pld	W	L	D	T	N/R	Pts	NRR
Vidarbha	4	3	1	0	0	0	12	+0.597
Kerala	4	3	1	0	0	0	12	+0.269
Gujarat	4	2	2	0	0	0	8	+0.086
Jharkhand	4	1	3	0	0	0	4	-0.321
Assam	4	1	3	0	0	0	4	-0.560

- Advanced to the Plate Quarter-finals

No.	Date	Team 1	Team 2	Venue	Result
8	6 December	Assam	Kerala	JSCA Oval Ground, Ranchi	Kerala Won by 88 Runs
9	6 December	Vidarbha	Jharkhand	JSCA International Stadium Complex, Ranchi	Vidarbha Won by 11 Runs
20	8 December	Gujarat	Kerala	JSCA International Stadium Complex, Ranchi	Kerala Won by 4 Wickets
21	8 December	Vidarbha	Assam	JSCA Oval Ground, Ranchi	Vidarbha Won by 36 Runs
32	10 December	Gujarat	Jharkhand	JSCA International Stadium Complex, Ranchi	Gujarat Won by 75 Runs
33	10 December	Kerala	Vidarbha	JSCA Oval Ground, Ranchi	Vidarbha Won by 7 Wickets
44	12 December	Jharkhand	Assam	JSCA International Stadium Complex, Ranchi	Jharkhand Won by 36 Runs
45	12 December	Vidarbha	Gujarat	JSCA Oval Ground, Ranchi	Gujarat Won by 6 Wickets
56	14 December	Jharkhand	Kerala	JSCA International Stadium Complex, Ranchi	Kerala Won by 5 Wickets
57	14 December	Assam	Gujarat	JSCA Oval Ground, Ranchi	Assam Won by 48 Runs

Plate Group C

Team	Pld	W	L	D	T	N/R	Pts	NRR
Bengal	5	3	1	0	0	1	14	+1.138
Goa	5	3	1	0	0	1	14	+0.571
Tripura	5	3	1	0	0	1	14	+0.482
Chhattisgarh	5	2	2	0	0	1	10	+0.645
Rajasthan	5	1	3	0	0	1	6	-0.300
J & K	5	0	4	0	0	1	2	-2.535

- Advanced to the Plate Semi-finals
- Advanced to the Plate Quarter-finals

No.	Date	Team 1	Team 2	Venue	Result
10	6 December	J & K	Bengal	Bengal Cricket Academy Ground, Kalyani	Bengal Won by 10 Wickets
11	6 December	Rajasthan	Tripura	JU Second Campus, Salt Lake, Kolkata	Tripura Won by 42 Runs
12	6 December	Chhattisgarh	Goa	Eden Gardens, Kolkata	Goa Won by 2 Wickets
22	8 December	J & K	Chhattisgarh	JU Second Campus, Salt Lake, Kolkata	Chhattisgarh Won by 162 Runs
23	8 December	Bengal	Tripura	Bengal Cricket Academy Ground, Kalyani	Tripura Won by 9 Runs
24	8 December	Goa	Rajasthan	Eden Gardens, Kolkata	Goa Won by 8 Wickets
34	10 December	Chhattisgarh	Tripura	JU Second Campus, Salt Lake, Kolkata	Match Abandoned
35	10 December	Bengal	Rajasthan	Bengal Cricket Academy Ground, Kalyani	Match Abandoned
36	10 December	Goa	J & K	Eden Gardens, Kolkata	Match Abandoned
46	12 December	Tripura	J & K	Eden Gardens, Kolkata	Tripura Won by 10 Wickets
47	12 December	Rajasthan	Chhattisgarh	JU Second Campus, Salt Lake, Kolkata	Chhattisgarh Won by 8 Wickets
48	12 December	Bengal	Goa	Bengal Cricket Academy Ground, Kalyani	Bengal Won by 7 Wickets
58	14 December	Rajasthan	J & K	JU Second Campus, Salt Lake, Kolkata	Rajasthan Won by 49 Runs
59	14 December	Chhattisgarh	Bengal	Bengal Cricket Academy Ground, Kalyani	Bengal Won by 8 Wickets
60	14 December	Tripura	Goa	Eden Gardens, Kolkata	Goa Won by 1 Wicket

==== Plate Knockout Stage ====
No.	Date	Team 1	Team 2	Venue	Result
Quarter-finals
63	21 December	Vidarbha	Haryana	JU Second Campus Ground, Salt Lake, Kolkata	Vidarbha Won by 10 Wickets
64	22 December	Goa	Kerala	JU Second Campus Ground, Salt Lake, Kolkata	Goa Won by 71 Runs
Semi-finals
67	24 December	Bengal	Vidarbha	Eden Gardens, Kolkata	Bengal Won by 37 Runs (Promoted to Elite Group 2018–19)
68	24 December	Karnataka	Goa	JU Second Campus Ground, Salt Lake, Kolkata	Goa Won by 3 Wickets (Promoted to Elite Group 2018–19)
Final
71	26 December	Bengal	Goa	Eden Gardens, Kolkata	Goa Won by 37 Runs

==== Elite Super League ====
Team	Pld	W	L	D	T	N/R	Pts	NRR
Railways	3	3	0	0	0	0	12	+2.031
Delhi	3	1	2	0	0	0	4	-0.602
Mumbai	3	1	2	0	0	0	4	-0.610
Andhra	3	1	2	0	0	0	4	+0.915

- Champions

Group stage
No.	Date	Team 1	Team 2	Venue	Result
61	21 December	Railways	Mumbai	Motibaug Cricket Ground, Vadodara	Railways Won by 96 Runs
62	21 December	Andhra	Delhi	Railway Ground, Vadodara	Andhra Won by 8 Wickets
65	23 December	Railways	Andhra	Railway Ground, Vadodara	Railways Won by 187 Runs
66	23 December	Delhi	Mumbai	Motibaug Cricket Ground, Vadodara	Delhi Won by 4 Wickets
69	25 December	Railways	Delhi	Motibaug Cricket Ground, Vadodara	Railways Won by 5 Wickets
70	25 December	Andhra	Mumbai	Motibaug Cricket Ground, Vadodara	Mumbai Won by 4 Wickets

== January ==
=== Women's Challenger Trophy ===
Team	Pld	W	L	T	N/R	Pts	NRR
India Green	2	2	0	0	0	8	+0.737
India Blue	2	1	1	0	0	4	-0.192
India Red	2	0	2	0	0	0	-0.557

The top two teams qualified for the finals

No.	Date	Team 1	Team 2	Venue	Result
Group stage
1	4 January	India Red	India Blue	Holkar Stadium, Indore	India Blue Won by 8 Wickets
2	5 January	India Green	India Red	Holkar Stadium, Indore	India Green Won by 8 Wickets
3	6 January	India Blue	India Green	Holkar Stadium, Indore	India Green Won by 36 Runs
Final
4	8 January	India Blue	India Green	Holkar Stadium, Indore	India Blue Won by 33 Runs

=== Syed Mushtaq Ali Trophy ===
==== Zonal Stage ====
North Zone

Pos	Team	Mat	Won	Lost	Drawn	Tied	N/R	Net RR	Pts
1	Delhi	5	4	1	0	0	0	+2.267	16
2	Punjab	5	3	2	0	0	0	-0.140	12
3	Services	5	2	3	0	0	0	+0.121	8
4	Haryana	5	2	3	0	0	0	-0.200	8
5	Himachal	5	2	3	0	0	0	-0.804	8
6	J & K	5	2	3	0	0	0	-0.838	8

Advanced to Super League

No.	Date	Team 1	Team 2	Venue	Result
2	8 January	Services	J & K	Feroz Shah Kotla, New Delhi	Services Won by 9 Wickets
3	8 January	Himachal	Haryana	Feroz Shah Kotla, New Delhi	Himachal Won by one over Eliminator
1	9 January	Delhi	Punjab	Feroz Shah Kotla, New Delhi	Punjab Won by 2 Runs
14	9 January	Himachal	J & K	Feroz Shah Kotla, New Delhi	Himachal Won by 33 Runs
13	10 January	Delhi	Haryana	Feroz Shah Kotla, New Delhi	Delhi Won by 7 Wickets
15	10 January	Punjab	Services	Feroz Shah Kotla, New Delhi	Punjab Won by 8 Wickets
32	12 January	Delhi	J & K	Feroz Shah Kotla, New Delhi	Delhi Won by 8 Wickets
30	12 January	Punjab	Haryana	Feroz Shah Kotla, New Delhi	Haryana Won by 5 Wickets
31	13 January	Himachal	Services	Feroz Shah Kotla, New Delhi	Services Won by 5 Wickets
47	13 January	Haryana	J & K	Feroz Shah Kotla, New Delhi	J & K Won by 4 Wickets
35	14 January	Punjab	J & K	Feroz Shah Kotla, New Delhi	J & K Won by 23 Runs
48	14 January	Delhi	Himachal	Feroz Shah Kotla, New Delhi	Delhi Won by 10 Wickets
49	15 January	Haryana	Services	Feroz Shah Kotla, New Delhi	Haryana Won by 4 Wickets
36	15 January	Himachal	Punjab	Feroz Shah Kotla, New Delhi	Punjab Won by 19 Runs
37	16 January	Delhi	Services	Feroz Shah Kotla, New Delhi	Delhi Won by 22 Runs

South Zone

Pos	Team	Mat	Won	Lost	Drawn	Tied	N/R	Net RR	Pts
1	Karnataka	5	4	1	0	0	0	+1.354	16
2	Tamil Nadu	5	4	1	0	0	0	+0.435	16
3	Andhra	5	4	1	0	0	0	+0.109	16
4	Hyderabad	5	2	3	0	0	0	-0.074	8
5	Kerala	5	1	4	0	0	0	-0.375	4
6	Goa	5	0	5	0	0	0	-1.499	0

Advanced to Super League

No.	Date	Team 1	Team 2	Venue	Result
4	8 January	Kerala	Hyderabad	Dr PVG Raju ACA Sports Complex, Vizianagaram	Hyderabad Won by 10 Runs
5	8 January	Andhra	Tamil Nadu	Dr. Y.S. Rajasekhara Reddy ACA-VDCA Cricket Stadium, Visakhapatnam	Tamil Nadu Won by 7 Wickets
6	8 January	Goa	Karnataka	Dr. Y.S. Rajasekhara Reddy ACA-VDCA Cricket Stadium, Visakhapatnam	Karnataka Won by 49 Runs
16	9 January	Kerala	Tamil Nadu	Dr. Y.S. Rajasekhara Reddy ACA-VDCA Cricket Stadium, Visakhapatnam	Tamil Nadu Won by 35 Runs
17	9 January	Goa	Hyderabad	Dr. Y.S. Rajasekhara Reddy ACA-VDCA Cricket Stadium, Visakhapatnam	Hyderabad Won by 19 Runs
18	9 January	Andhra	Karnataka	Dr PVG Raju ACA Sports Complex, Vizianagaram	Andhra Won by 7 Wickets
23	11 January	Andhra	Kerala	Dr. Y.S. Rajasekhara Reddy ACA-VDCA Cricket Stadium, Visakhapatnam	Andhra Won by 6 Wickets
24	11 January	Hyderabad	Karnataka	Dr. Y.S. Rajasekhara Reddy ACA-VDCA Cricket Stadium, Visakhapatnam	Karnataka Won by 2 Runs
25	11 January	Goa	Tamil Nadu	Dr PVG Raju ACA Sports Complex, Vizianagaram	Tamil Nadu Won by 25 Runs
38	12 January	Andhra	Hyderabad	Dr PVG Raju ACA Sports Complex, Vizianagaram	Andhra Won by 6 Wickets
39	12 January	Tamil Nadu	Karnataka	Dr. Y.S. Rajasekhara Reddy ACA-VDCA Cricket Stadium, Visakhapatnam	Karnataka Won by 78 Runs
40	12 January	Goa	Kerala	Dr. Y.S. Rajasekhara Reddy ACA-VDCA Cricket Stadium, Visakhapatnam	Kerala Won by 9 Wickets
50	14 January	Andhra	Goa	Dr. Y.S. Rajasekhara Reddy ACA-VDCA Cricket Stadium, Visakhapatnam	Andhra Won by 18 Runs
51	14 January	Kerala	Karnataka	Dr PVG Raju ACA Sports Complex, Vizianagaram	Karnataka Won by 20 Runs
52	14 January	Tamil Nadu	Hyderabad	Dr. Y.S. Rajasekhara Reddy ACA-VDCA Cricket Stadium, Visakhapatnam	Tamil Nadu Won by 16 Runs

Central Zone

Pos	Team	Mat	Won	Lost	Drawn	Tied	N/R	Net RR	Pts
1	Rajasthan	5	4	1	0	0	0	+0.716	16
2	Uttar Pradesh	5	3	2	0	0	0	+0.585	12
3	Vidarbha	5	3	2	0	0	0	+0.505	12
4	Madhya Pradesh	5	3	2	0	0	0	+0.112	16
5	Railways	5	1	4	0	0	0	-0.790	4
6	Chhattisgarh	5	1	4	0	0	0	-1.237	4

Advanced to Super League

No.	Date	Team 1	Team 2	Venue	Result
11	8 January	Rajasthan	Madhya Pradesh	Shaheed Veer Narayan Singh International Stadium, Raipur	Rajasthan Won by 36 Runs
12	8 January	Chhattisgarh	Vidarbha	Shaheed Veer Narayan Singh International Stadium, Raipur	Vidarbha Won by 48 Runs
21	9 January	Rajasthan	Uttar Pradesh	Shaheed Veer Narayan Singh International Stadium, Raipur	Rajasthan Won by 4 Wickets
22	9 January	Railways	Vidarbha	Shaheed Veer Narayan Singh International Stadium, Raipur	Vidarbha Won by 17 Runs
28	10 January	Madhya Pradesh	Uttar Pradesh	Shaheed Veer Narayan Singh International Stadium, Raipur	Madhya Pradesh Won by 7 Wickets
29	10 January	Chhattisgarh	Railways	Shaheed Veer Narayan Singh International Stadium, Raipur	Chhattisgarh Won by 25 Runs
45	12 January	Vidarbha	Madhya Pradesh	Shaheed Veer Narayan Singh International Stadium, Raipur	Vidarbha Won by 7 Runs
46	12 January	Chhattisgarh	Rajasthan	Shaheed Veer Narayan Singh International Stadium, Raipur	Rajasthan Won by 7 Wickets
53	13 January	Railways	Uttar Pradesh	Shaheed Veer Narayan Singh International Stadium, Raipur	Uttar Pradesh Won by 7 Wickets
54	13 January	Vidarbha	Rajasthan	Shaheed Veer Narayan Singh International Stadium, Raipur	Rajasthan Won by 6 Wickets
59	14 January	Chhattisgarh	Madhya Pradesh	Shaheed Veer Narayan Singh International Stadium, Raipur	Madhya Pradesh Won by 5 Wickets
60	15 January	Railways	Madhya Pradesh	Shaheed Veer Narayan Singh International Stadium, Raipur	Madhya Pradesh Won by 24 Runs
61	15 January	Vidarbha	Uttar Pradesh	Shaheed Veer Narayan Singh International Stadium, Raipur	Uttar Pradesh Won by 6 Runs
64	16 January	Rajasthan	Railways	Shaheed Veer Narayan Singh International Stadium, Raipur	Railways Won by 4 Wickets
65	16 January	Chhattisgarh	Uttar Pradesh	Shaheed Veer Narayan Singh International Stadium, Raipur	Uttar Pradesh Won by 6 Wickets

West Zone

Pos	Team	Mat	Won	Lost	Drawn	Tied	N/R	Net RR	Pts
1	Baroda	4	4	0	0	0	0	+1.218	16
2	Mumbai	4	2	2	0	0	0	+0.803	8
3	Saurashtra	4	2	2	0	0	0	-0.222	8
4	Gujarat	4	1	3	0	0	0	-0.405	4
5	Maharashtra	4	1	3	0	0	0	-1.270	4

Advance to Super League

No.	Date	Team 1	Team 2	Venue	Result
9	7 January	Mumbai	Baroda	Saurashtra Cricket Association Stadium, Rajkot	Baroda Won by 13 Runs
10	7 January	Gujarat	Maharashtra	Saurashtra Cricket Association Stadium, Rajkot	Maharashtra Won by 4 Wickets
19	8 January	Saurashtra	Maharashtra	Saurashtra Cricket Association Stadium, Rajkot	Saurashtra Won by 4 Runs
20	8 January	Mumbai	Gujarat	Saurashtra Cricket Association Stadium, Rajkot	Mumbai Won by 5 Wickets
34	10 January	Baroda	Gujarat	Saurashtra Cricket Association Stadium, Rajkot	Baroda Won by 36 Runs
33	10 January	Mumbai	Saurashtra	Saurashtra Cricket Association Stadium, Rajkot	Saurashtra Won by 8 Wickets
44	11 January	Mumbai	Maharashtra	Saurashtra Cricket Association Stadium, Rajkot	Mumbai Won by 7 Wickets
43	11 January	Baroda	Saurashtra	Saurashtra Cricket Association Stadium, Rajkot	Baroda Won by 8 Wickets
57	13 January	Saurashtra	Gujarat	Saurashtra Cricket Association Stadium, Rajkot	Gujarat Won by 8 Wickets
58	13 January	Baroda	Maharashtra	Saurashtra Cricket Association Stadium, Rajkot	Baroda Won by 5 Wickets

East Zone

Pos	Team	Mat	Won	Lost	Drawn	Tied	N/R	Net RR	Pts
1	Bengal	4	4	0	0	0	0	+0.863	16
2	Jharkhand	4	3	1	0	0	0	+1.080	12
3	Odisha	4	2	2	0	0	0	+1.085	8
4	Tripura	4	1	3	0	0	0	-1.326	4
5	Assam	4	0	4	0	0	0	-1.484	0

Advanced to Super League

No.	Date	Team 1	Team 2	Venue	Result
07	8 January	Assam	Tripura	JSCA International Stadium Complex, Ranchi	Tripura Won by 8 Runs
08	8 January	Bengal	Odisha	JSCA International Stadium Complex, Ranchi	Bengal Won by 7 Wickets
27	10 January	Jharkhand	Tripura	JSCA International Stadium Complex, Ranchi	Jharkhand Won by 24 Runs
26	10 January	Assam	Odisha	JSCA International Stadium Complex, Ranchi	Odisha Won by 51 Runs
42	12 January	Tripura	Odisha	JSCA International Stadium Complex, Ranchi	Odisha Won by 72 Runs
41	12 January	Jharkhand	Bengal	JSCA International Stadium Complex, Ranchi	Bengal Won by 6 Wickets
56	14 January	Bengal	Tripura	JSCA International Stadium Complex, Ranchi	Bengal Won by 9 Wickets
55	14 January	Assam	Jharkhand	JSCA International Stadium Complex, Ranchi	Jharkhand Won by 8 Wickets
62	16 January	Bengal	Assam	JSCA International Stadium Complex, Ranchi	Bengal Won by 6 Wickets
63	16 January	Jharkhand	Odisha	JSCA International Stadium Complex, Ranchi	Jharkhand Won by 8 Wickets

==== Super League Stage ====
Super League Group A

Team	Pld	W	L	Tie	A	Pts	NRR
Rajasthan	4	3	1	0	0	12	+0.519
Punjab	4	3	1	0	0	12	+0.080
Karnataka	4	2	2	0	0	8	+1.418
Mumbai	4	1	3	0	0	4	–0.302
Jharkhand	4	1	3	0	0	4	–1.747

Advanced to Final

No.	Date	Team 1	Team 2	Venue	Result
68	21 January	Punjab	Karnataka	Jadavpur University Campus Ground, Kolkata	Punjab Won by one over Eliminator
69	21 January	Jharkhand	Mumbai	Jadavpur University Campus Ground, Kolkata	Mumbai Won by 13 Runs
72	22 January	Jharkhand	Rajasthan	Jadavpur University Campus Ground, Kolkata	Rajasthan Won by 4 Wickets
73	22 January	Punjab	Mumbai	Jadavpur University Campus Ground, Kolkata	Punjab Won by 3 Wickets
76	23 January	Rajasthan	Karnataka	Jadavpur University Campus Ground, Kolkata	Rajasthan Won by 22 Runs
77	23 January	Punjab	Jharkhand	Eden Gardens, Kolkata	Jharkhand Won by 4 Wickets
80	24 January	Mumbai	Rajasthan	Eden Gardens, Kolkata	Rajasthan Won by 17 Runs
81	24 January	Karnataka	Jharkhand	Eden Gardens, Kolkata	Karnataka Won by 123 Runs
84	25 January	Punjab	Rajasthan	Eden Gardens, Kolkata	Punjab Won by 5 Runs
85	25 January	Karnataka	Mumbai	Eden Gardens, Kolkata	Karnataka Won by 7 Wickets

Super League Group B

Team	Pld	W	L	Tie	A	Pts	NRR
Delhi	4	3	1	0	0	12	+1.411
Uttar Pradesh	4	2	2	0	0	8	+0.600
Baroda	4	2	2	0	0	8	+1.011
Bengal	4	2	2	0	0	8	–0.692
Tamil Nadu	4	1	3	0	0	4	–1.178

Advanced to Final

No.	Date	Team 1	Team 2	Venue	Result
66	21 January	Delhi	Tamil Nadu	Eden Gardens, Kolkata	Delhi Won by 8 Wickets
67	21 January	Bengal	Baroda	Eden Gardens, Kolkata	Baroda Won by 17 Runs
70	22 January	Bengal	Uttar Pradesh	Eden Gardens, Kolkata	Uttar Pradesh Won by 75 Runs
71	22 January	Delhi	Baroda	Eden Gardens, Kolkata	Delhi Won by 2 Wickets
75	23 January	Delhi	Bengal	Jadavpur University Campus Ground, Kolkata	Bengal Won by 3 Runs
74	23 January	Uttar Pradesh	Tamil Nadu	Eden Gardens, Kolkata	Tamil Nadu Won by 5 Wickets
78	24 January	Baroda	Uttar Pradesh	Jadavpur University Campus Ground, Kolkata	Uttar Pradesh Won by 7 Wickets
79	24 January	Tamil Nadu	Bengal	Jadavpur University Campus Ground, Kolkata	Bengal Won by 7 Wickets
82	25 January	Delhi	Uttar Pradesh	Jadavpur University Campus Ground, Kolkata	Delhi Won by 3 Runs
83	25 January	Tamil Nadu	Baroda	Jadavpur University Campus Ground, Kolkata	Baroda Won by 5 Wickets

==== Final ====
No.	Date	Team 1	Captain 1	Team 2	Captain 2	Venue	Result
86	26 January	Delhi	Pradeep Sangwan	Rajasthan	Aniket Choudhary	Eden Gardens, Kolkata	Delhi Won by 41 Runs

== February ==
=== Vijay Hazare Trophy ===
==== Group stage ====
Group A

Points table

Team	Pld	W	L	T	NR	Pts	NRR
Baroda	6	5	1	0	0	20	+2.012
Karnataka	6	4	1	0	1	18	+1.489
Punjab	6	3	3	0	0	12	+0.473
Odisha	6	3	3	0	0	12	–0.224
Railways	6	3	3	0	0	12	–0.444
Haryana	6	2	3	0	1	10	–0.426
Assam	6	0	6	0	0	0	–2.401

- Top two teams advanced to the knockout stage

Group B

Points table

Team	Pld	W	L	T	NR	Pts	NRR
Maharashtra	6	4	1	0	1	18	+0.878
Delhi	6	4	2	0	0	16	+0.727
Kerala	6	3	2	1	0	14	+0.288
Himachal Pradesh	6	3	2	0	1	14	–0.108
Uttar Pradesh	6	3	3	0	0	12	–0.563
Bengal	6	2	3	1	0	10	+0.007
Tripura	6	0	6	0	0	0	–1.127

- Top two teams advanced to the knockout stage

Group C

Points table

Team	Pld	W	L	T	NR	Pts	NRR
Andhra	6	6	0	0	0	24	+0.626
Mumbai	6	4	2	0	0	16	+0.324
Madhya Pradesh	6	3	3	0	0	12	+0.112
Goa	6	3	3	0	0	12	–0.411
Tamil Nadu	6	2	4	0	0	8	+0.468
Rajasthan	6	2	4	0	0	8	–0.791
Gujarat	6	1	5	0	0	4	–0.321

- Top two teams advanced to the knockout stage

Group D

Points table

Team	Pld	W	L	T	NR	Pts	NRR
Hyderabad	6	5	1	0	0	20	+0.646
Saurashtra	6	4	2	0	0	16	+1.017
Vidarbha	6	4	2	0	0	16	+0.718
Chhattisgarh	6	4	2	0	0	16	–0.103
Jharkhand	6	2	4	0	0	8	+0.325
Jammu & Kashmir	6	2	4	0	0	8	–1.040
Services	6	0	6	0	0	0	–1.508

- Top two teams advanced to the knockout stage

==== Knockout stage ====
No.	Date	Team 1	Captain 1	Team 2	Captain 2	Venue	Result
Quarter-finals
86	21 February	Hyderabad	Ambati Rayudu	Karnataka	Karun Nair	Feroz Shah Kotla, New Delhi	Karnataka Won by 103 Runs
87	21 February	Mumbai	Aditya Tare	Maharashtra	Rahul Tripathi	Palam A Stadium, New Delhi	Maharashtra Won by 7 Wickets
88	22 February	Saurashtra	Cheteshwar Pujara	Baroda	Deepak Hooda	Feroz Shah Kotla, New Delhi	Saurashtra Won by 3 Wickets
89	22 February	Andhra	Hanuma Vihari	Delhi	Ishant Sharma	Palam A Stadium, New Delhi	Andhra Won by 6 Wickets
Semi-finals
90	24 February	Karnataka	Karun Nair	Maharashtra	Rahul Tripathi	Feroz Shah Kotla, New Delhi	Karnataka Won by 9 Wickets
91	25 February	Saurashtra	Cheteshwar Pujara	Andhra	Hanuma Vihari	Feroz Shah Kotla, New Delhi	Saurashtra Won by 59 Runs
Final
92	27 February	Karnataka	Karun Nair	Saurashtra	Cheteshwar Pujara	Feroz Shah Kotla, New Delhi	Karnataka Won by 41 Runs

== March ==
=== Deodhar Trophy ===
Team	Pld	W	L	Tie	N/R	Pts	NRR
Karnataka	2	2	0	0	0	8	+0.710
India B	2	1	1	0	0	4	+1.049
India A	2	0	2	0	0	0	–1.927

advanced to Finals

No.	Date	Team 1	Captain 1	Team 2	Captain 2	Venue	Result
Group stage
1	4 March	India A	Ankit Bawane	India B	Shreyas Iyer	Himachal Pradesh Cricket Association Stadium, Dharamsala	India B Won by 8 Wickets (VJD Method)
2	5 March	India B	Shreyas Iyer	Karnataka	Karun Nair	Himachal Pradesh Cricket Association Stadium, Dharamsala	Karnataka Won by 6 Runs
3	6 March	India A	Ankit Bawane	Karnataka	Karun Nair	Himachal Pradesh Cricket Association Stadium, Dharamsala	Karnataka Won by 65 Runs
Final
4	8 March	Karnataka	Karun Nair	India B	Shreyas Iyer	Himachal Pradesh Cricket Association Stadium, Dharamsala	India B Won by 6 Wickets

=== Australia women in India ===
2017–20 ICC Women's Championship – WODI series
No.	Date	Home captain	Away captain	Venue	Result
WODI 1101	12 March	Harmanpreet Kaur	Meg Lanning	Reliance Stadium, Vadodara	Australia by 8 wickets
WODI 1102	15 March	Mithali Raj	Meg Lanning	Reliance Stadium, Vadodara	Australia by 60 runs
WODI 1103	18 March	Mithali Raj	Meg Lanning	Reliance Stadium, Vadodara	Australia by 97 runs

=== Irani Cup ===
No.	Date	Team 1	Captain 1	Team 2	Captain 2	Venue	Result
1	14 March	Vidarbha	Faiz Fazal	Rest of India	Karun Nair	Vidarbha Cricket Association Stadium, Nagpur	Match Drawn Vidarbha took first innings lead

=== Senior Women's Inter Zonal Three Day League ===
Team	Pld	W	L	D	T	N/R	Pts	NRR
North Zone (C)	4	2	0	2	0	0	19	+0.185
South Zone	4	2	1	1	0	0	13	-0.354
West Zone	4	1	2	1	0	0	10	-0.445
Central Zone	4	1	2	1	0	0	7	+0.729
East Zone	4	0	1	3	0	0	5	-0.084

No.	Date	Team 1	Team 2	Venue	Result
1	18 March	South Zone	West Zone	St Xavier's College Ground, Thiruvananthapuram	West Zone Won by 10 Wickets
2	18 March	East Zone	North Zone	Greenfield International Stadium, Thiruvananthapuram	Match Drawn North Zone took first innings lead
3	22 March	North Zone	South Zone	St Xavier's College Ground, Thiruvananthapuram	Match Drawn North Zone took first innings lead
4	22 March	East Zone	Central Zone	Greenfield International Stadium, Thiruvananthapuram	Match Drawn East Zone took first innings lead
5	26 March	North Zone	West Zone	St Xavier's College Ground, Thiruvananthapuram	North Zone Won by an innings and 8 Runs
6	26 March	Central Zone	South Zone	Greenfield International Stadium, Thiruvananthapuram	South Zone Won by 105 Runs
7	30 March	East Zone	West Zone	St Xavier's College Ground, Thiruvananthapuram	Match Drawn West Zone took first innings lead
8	30 March	Central Zone	North Zone	Greenfield International Stadium, Thiruvananthapuram	North Zone Won by 9 Wickets
9	3 April	West Zone	Central Zone	St Xavier's College Ground, Thiruvananthapuram	Central Zone Won by 8 Wickets
10	3 April	East Zone	South Zone	Greenfield International Stadium, Thiruvananthapuram	South Zone Won by 119 Runs

=== Women's Tri-Nation Series ===
Team	P	W	L	T	NR	Pts	NRR
Australia	4	3	1	0	0	6	+1.323
England	4	2	2	0	0	4	–0.923
India	4	1	3	0	0	2	–0.399

Advanced to Finals

WT20I Tri-series
No.	Date	Team 1	Captain 1	Team 2	Captain 2	Venue	Result
WT20I 402	22 March	India	Harmanpreet Kaur	Australia	Meg Lanning	Brabourne Stadium, Mumbai	Australia by 6 wickets
WT20I 403	23 March	Australia	Rachael Haynes	England	Heather Knight	Brabourne Stadium, Mumbai	England by 8 wickets
WT20I 405	25 March	India	Harmanpreet Kaur	England	Heather Knight	Brabourne Stadium, Mumbai	England by 7 wickets
WT20I 406	26 March	India	Harmanpreet Kaur	Australia	Meg Lanning	Brabourne Stadium, Mumbai	Australia by 36 runs
WT20I 407	28 March	Australia	Meg Lanning	England	Heather Knight	Brabourne Stadium, Mumbai	Australia by 8 wickets
WT20I 409	29 March	India	Harmanpreet Kaur	England	Heather Knight	Brabourne Stadium, Mumbai	India by 8 wickets
Final
WT20I 411	31 March	Australia	Meg Lanning	England	Danielle Hazell	Brabourne Stadium, Mumbai	Australia by 57 runs

== April ==
=== England women in India ===
WODI series
No.	Date	Home captain	Away captain	Venue	Result
WODI 1107	6 April	Mithali Raj	Anya Shrubsole	Vidarbha Cricket Association Stadium, Nagpur	India by 1 wicket
WODI 1108	9 April	Mithali Raj	Heather Knight	Vidarbha Cricket Association Stadium, Nagpur	England by 8 wickets
WODI 1109	12 April	Mithali Raj	Heather Knight	Vidarbha Cricket Association Stadium, Nagpur	India by 8 wickets
