= UPCA =

UPCA may refer to:

- Uttar Pradesh Cricket Association
- Federal Republic of Central America, originally the United Provinces of Central America
- University of the Philippines College of Agriculture
- UPC-A, a specific format of a Universal Product Code
- Unified Patent Court Agreement, an international treaty provisionally applicable since January 19, 2022, and establishing a common patent court in Europe
