= Meghalaya Cricket Association =

Governing body of cricket in Meghalaya state, India

- Sport: Cricket
- Abbreviation: MCA
- Affiliation: BCCI
- Location: Meghalaya
- President: Naba Bhattacharjee
- Secretary: Gideon Kharkongor

Official website
- www.meghalayacricket.com

The Meghalaya Cricket Association is the governing body of cricket activities in the Meghalaya state of India and the Meghalaya cricket team. It is affiliated with the Board of Control for Cricket in India as a Full Member. Shri Danny Marak is the head of the association, while Shri Gideon Kharkongor is the new Honorary Secretary .
