= Jharkhand State Cricket Association =

Governing body of Cricket in Jharkhand state, India

- official Logo
- Sport: Cricket
- Jurisdiction: Regional
- Membership: Full Member (BCCI)
- Abbreviation: JSCA
- Founded: November 2000, 15; 25 years ago
- Affiliation: Board of Control for Cricket in India
- Affiliation date: 2003; 23 years ago
- Regional affiliation: East Zone
- Headquarters: Keenan Stadium, Jamshedpur
- Location: Jamshedpur Jharkhand
- President: Ajaynath Shah Deo
- Secretary: Saurabh Tiwary
- Coach: S. S Rao

Official website
- www.cricjharkhand.org
- (India)

Jharkhand State Cricket Association is the governing body of the cricket activities in the Jharkhand state of India and the Jharkhand cricket team. It is affiliated to the Board of Control for Cricket in India.

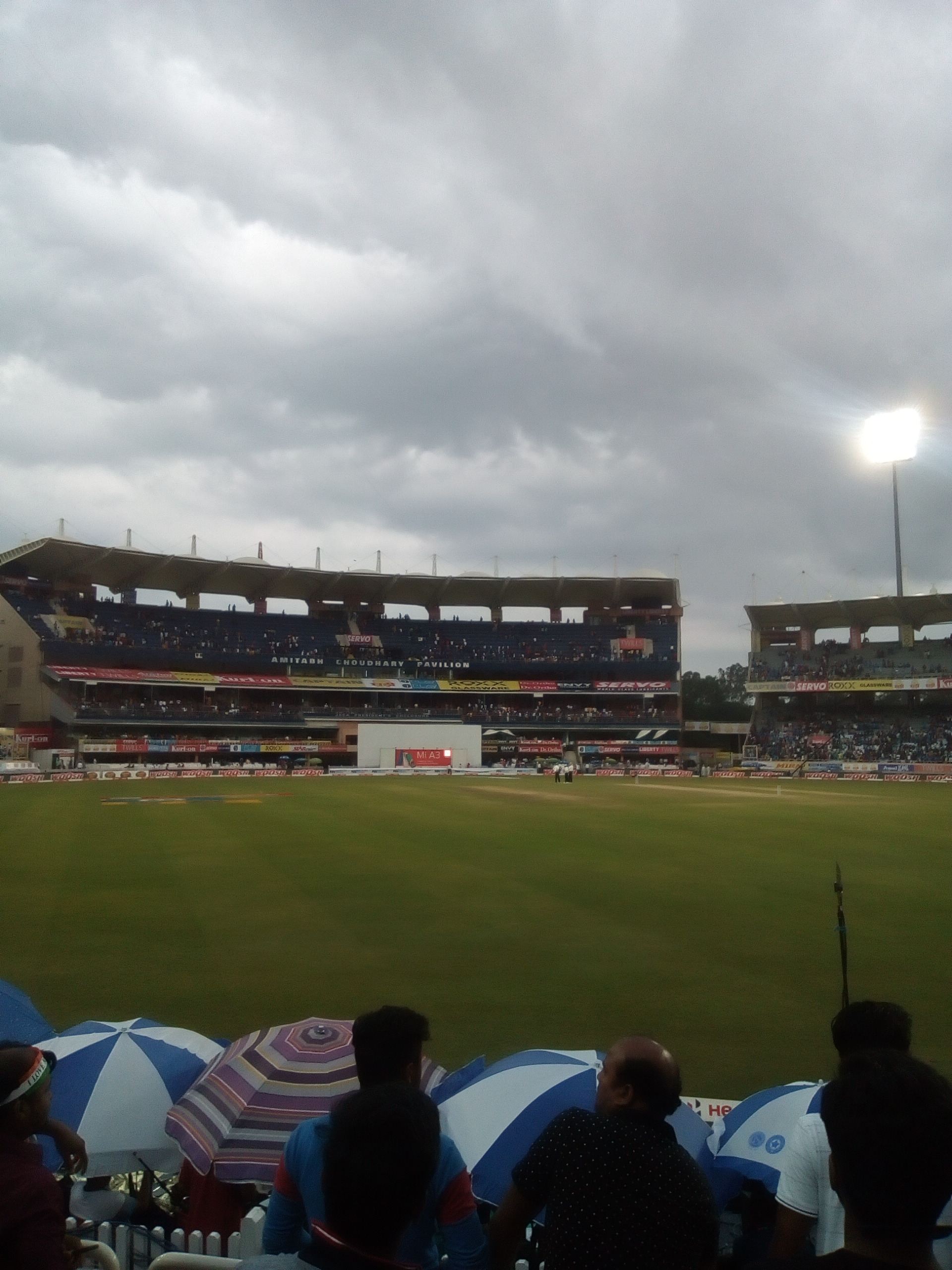
Headquarters of Jharkhand State Cricket Association (JSCA), Ranchi

== History ==
It came in existence in year 2000 and got full membership of BCCI in 2003.

Association stands at a historic phase in its history, not only the former captain of the national side Mahendra Singh Dhoni is from Jharkhand but several other players have made their mark on the national stage in the past few years, three of them going on to play for the country.

In March 2011, for the first time in the history of the Association, the state team demolished Gujarat in the Finals to win the Vijay Hazare Trophy, a victory symbolic of the ascendancy of Jharkhand cricket.

A number of players had also gone on to perform valuable roles for their various franchises in the Indian Premier League. The construction of International Stadium at Ranchi had help the association to grow and helped more the player to play cricket. The construction began in the June 2009 and hosted its first first-class match in November, 2010.

Apart from a world-class stadium, the complex also has a second regulation, The Ranchi Oval, a fully equipped Indoor Cricket Facility, outdoor practice nets with ten wickets, state of the art synthetic tennis courts, a swimming pool, a clubhouse, etcetera.

== Affiliated districts ==
- Bokaro District Cricket Association
- Cricket Association of Saraikela-Kharswan
- Jamtara District Cricket Association
- Koderma District Cricket Association
- Chatra District Cricket Association
- Dhanbad Cricket Association
- Lohardaga District Cricket Association
- Latehar District Cricket Association
- District Cricket Association Dumka
- District Cricket Association Deoghar
- Palamu Cricket Association
- Pakur District Cricket Association
- District Cricket Association Sahibganj
- District Cricket Association Godda
- Ranchi District Cricket Association
- Ramgarh Cricket Association
- Garhwa District Cricket Association
- Giridih District Cricket Association
- Simdega District Cricket Association
- West Singhbhum District Cricket Association
- Gumla District Cricket Association
- Hazaribag District Cricket Association
- Khunti District Cricket Association

== Home ground ==
- Keenan Stadium, Jamshedpur – Oldest venue in the state, has been hosted 10 ODIs
- JSCA International Cricket Stadium – Hosted 4 ODIs, IPL and Champions League T20 matches

== Notable players ==
Following players of Jharkhand cricket team, who has represented India as of 7 October 2022 :

- Mahendra Singh Dhoni – former captain of Indian men's cricket team, led India in 2007 T20 and 2011 ODI world cup victory.
- Saurabh Tiwary – played ODIs for Indian national cricket team
- Varun Aaron – a fast bowler, played Indian cricket team
- Shahbaz Nadeem – a spinner played for Indian team
- Ishan Kishan – a wicketkeeper batsman

== See also ==
- Jharkhand cricket team
