= Nakul Verma =

Indian cricketer (born 1991)

Personal information
- Full name: Nakul Harpal Verma
- Born: 14 April 1991 (age 35); Delhi, India
- Batting: Right-handed
- Bowling: Legbreak googly
- Role: Wicket-keeper

Domestic team information
- Years: Team
- 2012-present: Services

Career statistics
Competition	FC
Matches	32
Runs scored	1,398
Batting average	26.37
100s/50s	3/5
Top score	156*
Balls bowled	120
Wickets	1
Bowling average	80.00
5 wickets in innings	0
10 wickets in match	0
Best bowling	1/7
Catches/stumpings	64/7
- Source: ESPNcricinfo, 17 October 2015

Nakul Verma (born 14 April 1991) is an Indian cricketer who plays for Services as a wicket-keeper. He made his first-class debut in 2012 for Services against Kerala.
