= Vidarbha Cricket Association =

Governing body of cricket in the Vidarbha region of Maharashtra state, India

- Official logo
- Sport: Cricket
- Jurisdiction: Vidarbha, Maharashtra, India
- Abbreviation: VCA
- Founded: 1956
- Affiliation: Board of Control for Cricket in India
- Affiliation date: 1956
- Headquarters: Vidarbha Cricket Association Ground
- Location: Nagpur
- President: Retd. Justice Vinay Deshpande
- Secretary: Sharad Padhye
- Coach: Ashok Upadhyay

Official website
- www.vca.co.in

The Vidarbha Cricket Association is the governing body of the cricket activities in the Vidarbha region in Maharashtra state of India and the Vidarbha cricket team. It is affiliated to the Board of Control for Cricket in India.

N. K. P. Salve remained President of Vidarbha Cricket Association from 1972 to 1980, he later remained president of Board of Control for Cricket in India from 1982 to 1985.
