= Arunachal Cricket Association =

Governing body of cricket in Arunachal Pradesh state, India

- Sport: Cricket
- Jurisdiction: Arunachal Pradesh, India
- Abbreviation: ACA
- Founded: 2007
- Affiliation: Board of Control for Cricket in India
- Location: Itanagar, Arunachal Pradesh, India
- President: TC Tok
- Vice president: Nabam Vivek
- Secretary: Kabak Geda
- Coach: Sanjeev Sharma

Official website
- arunachalcricket.in
- (India)

Arunachal Cricket Association is the governing body of the Cricket activities in the Arunachal Pradesh state of India and the Arunachal Pradesh cricket team. It is affiliated to the Board of Control for Cricket in India as full member.

== History ==
In September 2007, Arunachal Cricket Association applied for BCCI's affiliation. In October 2008, it got the BCCi's affiliation. The Arunachal Pradesh cricket team played its first domestic match in December 2009 in Under-19 tournament. The teams faced infrastructure issues during its inception.

In August 2010, the association faced corruption allegations regarding buying of land. After Lodha Panel ordered "One state, one vote" reforms, north east states were expected to get play in the 2017–18 senior domestic season but BCCI ignored the reforms order. After long legal battle, in July 2018, BCCI granted the association full member status and the team made its senior-level debut in 2018–19 season. In its debut season, the association received bribe offers for player selection. In September 2019, as per the reforms, its elections were held and TC Tok was elected as the association's president. In 2022 Shri TC Tok was re-elected as President, Kabak Geda was elected Vice President, Nabam Vivek was elected Honorary Secretary, Yab Lala was elected Treasurer, Techi Tagar was elected Joint Secretary but after the untimely death of Techi Tagar Tsering Thapkey was elected in a by-election in 2023. On 24 February 2026 Shri Nabam Vivek was elected President, Kame Yangfo, Vice President, Roger Nabam Hina was elected Honorary Secretary, Nipak Ngomle as Treasurer and Song Tacho as Joint Secretary.
