= Odisha Cricket Association =

Cricket organization in Odisha state, India

- Logo
- Sport: Cricket
- Jurisdiction: Odisha
- Abbreviation: OCA
- Founded: 1949; 77 years ago
- Affiliation: Board of Control for Cricket in India
- Headquarters: Barabati Stadium
- Location: Cuttack
- President: Pankaj Lochan Mohanty
- Secretary: Sanjay Behera
- Coach: Wasim Jaffer

Official website
- www.balasorecricket.in
- Other key staff: 17
- (India)

Odisha Cricket Association (abbreviated OCA) is the governing body for cricket activities in the Odisha state of India and the Odisha cricket team. It was formed in 1949 and was made into an independent registered body in 1961. Its headquarters is located in the Cuttack Barabati Stadium Complex. It is affiliated to the Board of Control for Cricket in India. The OCA started a state-level Twenty-20 tournament, Odisha Premier League (OPL) in the lines of Indian Premier League in 2011.

OCA manages the famous Barabati Stadium and has got infrastructures and facilities like Odisha cricket academy, newly built Sachin Tendulkar Indoor cricket hall and OCA Club complex and many grounds like DRIEMS cricket stadium, Ravenshaw university ground, SCB medical ground, Nimpur ground, Basundhara (Bidanasi) ground, Sunshine Ground, etc.

== Office bearers ==
=== Presidents ===
The following is a list of presidents of OCA:

Presidents	Tenure
Harekrushna Mahatab	14 July 1949 – 25 July 1976
Bhairab Chandra Mohanty	25 July 1976 – July 1980
George Patnaik	25 July 1976 – 4 September 1983
B. K. Biswal	4 September 1983 – 31 January 1986
R. Behera	31 January 1986 – 30 March 1991
Ranendra Pratap Swain	30 March 1991 – 30 June 1996
A. N. Pradhan	30 June 1996 – 25 June 2000
Prabhat Kumar Misra	25 June 2000 – 12 September 2004
Ranjib Biswal	12 September 2004 – 2 January 2017
Pankaj Lochan Mohanty	27 September 2019 – 27 October 2022
Pranab Prakash Das	28 October 2022 – 29 December 2024
Pankaj Lochan Mohanty	29 December 2024 – 15 February 2025 (acting)
Pankaj Lochan Mohanty	15 February 2025 – present

=== Secretaries ===
The following is a list of secretaries of OCA:

Secretaries	Tenure
S. K. Biswas	July 1949 – 25 April 1955
P. V. R. Murty	25 April 1955 – 19 March 1961
Bhairab Chandra Mohanty	19 March 1961 – 25 May 1976
Bibhuti Bhusan Das	25 May 1976 – 25 June 2000
Asirbad Behera	25 June 2000 – 2 January 2017
Dhiren Pallai	5 February 2017 – 27 September 2019 (OCA Working Committee)
Sanjay Behera	27 September 2019 – present

== Domestic tournament ==
- Odisha Pro T20 League

== Grounds ==
The following is a list of cricket grounds of OCA used for national and state tournaments. Grounds hosting international matches in bold.

Ground	Venue
**Barabati Stadium**	Cuttack
DRIEMS Ground	Cuttack
Nimpur Sports Ground	Cuttack
Bidanasi Ground	Cuttack
Sunshine Ground	Cuttack
Ravenshaw University Ground	Cuttack
KIIT Cricket Ground	Bhubaneswar
Vikash Ground (BBSR)	Bhubaneswar
Vikash Ground (BRG)	Bargarh
Veer Surendra Sai Stadium	Sambalpur
Gandhi Stadium	Balangir
