= Rajasthan Cricket Association =

Governing body for cricket sport in Rajasthan, India

- Sport: Cricket
- Jurisdiction: Rajasthan, India
- Abbreviation: RCA
- Founded: 1931
- Regional affiliation: Board of Control for Cricket in India
- Headquarters: Jaipur, Rajasthan, India
- Replaced: Rajputana Cricket Association

Official website
- www.cricketrajasthan.in
- (India)

The Rajasthan Cricket Association (RCA) is the governing body for cricket in the Indian state of Rajasthan. Headquartered in Jaipur, the RCA oversees the administration of cricket at the state level, including the selection and management of the Rajasthan cricket team, which competes in domestic tournaments such as the Ranji Trophy, Vijay Hazare Trophy, and Syed Mushtaq Ali Trophy. The RCA is affiliated with the Board of Control for Cricket in India (BCCI).

== History ==
The RCA was founded in 1931 in Ajmer as the Rajputana Cricket Association. The organization was established to foster cricket in the region, then known as Rajputana, and began participating in the Ranji Trophy from the 1935–36 season. The association’s early years saw matches against touring foreign teams, including a notable first-class game against the Marylebone Cricket Club (MCC) in 1933 at the Mayo College Ground in Ajmer. Following the formation of the state of Rajasthan, the organization was renamed the Rajasthan Cricket Association, and its headquarters shifted to Jaipur in 1957.

The association was headed by Bhagwat Singh of Mewar before 1972. The association hosted prominent cricketers like Prince Duleep Singhji, who conducted coaching sessions in Udaipur in 1959. The RCA’s leadership transitioned to the Rungta family from 1974 to 2004, followed by a period under Lalit Modi, who modernised infrastructure, including upgrades to the Sawai Mansingh Stadium.

The association (RCA) gives a monthly pension scheme for former Ranji players. Those with 5-14 matches receive Rs. 5,000 monthly, while those with 15-24 matches get Rs. 7,500.

== Future development ==
The Rajasthan Cricket Association (RCA) does not own a dedicated stadium, unlike many other Indian state cricket boards. It organizes domestic and international cricket matches at the Sawai Mansingh Stadium in Jaipur, which is owned by the Government of Rajasthan. On 5 February 2022, the RCA laid the foundation stone for a new cricket stadium near the Jaipur-Delhi bypass highway in Chonp village, approximately 25 kilometers from Jaipur. The stadium, expected to be completed within three years, will have a seating capacity of 75,000, making it the world’s third-largest cricket stadium after Narendra Modi Stadium and Melbourne Cricket Ground, based on seating capacity. The facility will include two practice grounds suitable for Ranji Trophy matches.
