= Nagaland Cricket Association =

Regional governing body of cricket in Nagaland state, India

- yes
- Sport: Cricket
- Jurisdiction: Nagaland
- Affiliation: Board of Control for Cricket in India
- Regional affiliation: North-East Zone

Official website
- nagalandcricket.com
- (India)

Nagaland Cricket Association is the governing body of the Cricket activities in the Nagaland state of India and the Nagaland cricket team (Men) and Nagaland women's cricket team (Women). It is affiliated to the Board of Control for Cricket in India as a full member.
