= Devendra Bundela =

Indian cricketer (born 1977)

Personal information
- Full name: Devendrasingh Bundela
- Born: 22 February 1977 (age 49); Indore, Madhya Pradesh, India
- Batting: Right-handed
- Bowling: Right-arm medium
- Role: Batsman

Domestic team information
- Years: Team
- 1995–2018: Madhya Pradesh

Career statistics
Competition	FC	LA	T20
Matches	164	82	8
Runs scored	10,004	2,299	110
Batting average	43.68	41.05	13.75
100s/50s	26/54	1/13	0/0
Top score	188	125*	32
Balls bowled	5,580	1,419	24
Wickets	58	27	0
Bowling average	45.65	42.37	–
5 wickets in innings	2	0	–
10 wickets in match	1	0	–
Best bowling	6/37	4/32	–
Catches/stumpings	103/–	31/-	4/–
- Source: ESPNcricinfo, 16 December 2013

Devendrasingh Bundela (born 22 February 1977) is a former Indian cricketer. He is a right-handed batsman for Madhya Pradesh and made his first-class debut in 1995/96. He was a highly successful professional for Whitehaven Cricket Club 2001–03. He became captain of Madhya Pradesh in the 2010 Ranji Trophy and was promoted to Ranji Trophy Super League next season. In November 2016, he made the record of highest Ranji Trophy appearances. He announced his retirement on 31 March 2018.
