= Haryana Cricket Association =

Governing body of cricket in Haryana state, India

- Affiliation: BCCI
- Location: Haryana, India

Official website
- haryanacricket.org
- (India)

Haryana Cricket Association is the governing body of the cricket activities in the Haryana state of India and the Haryana cricket team and the Haryana women's cricket team. It is affiliated to the Board of Control for Cricket in India.

Haryana Cricket Association affiliated to the Board of control for cricket in India is the parent body or governing the game of Cricket in Haryana, and involved in the conduct of the game from the grass root level to the International level.

The Haryana Cricket Association promotes and develops cricket by conducting various league tournaments, tournaments for the age group Under-13, Under-15, Under-17, and Under-19, Under-22 and Under-25 categories besides organising and conducting national tournaments.

== See also ==
- Dominence of Haryana in sports
