= Chhattisgarh State Cricket Sangh =

Governing body of cricket activities in Chhattisgarh, India

- Sport: Cricket
- Jurisdiction: Chhattisgarh, India
- Abbreviation: CSCS
- Founded: 2000
- Affiliation: Board of Control for Cricket in India
- Regional affiliation: Central
- Headquarters: Shaheed Veer Narayan Singh International Cricket Stadium, Naya Raipur
- Location: Naya Raipur, Chhattisgarh, India
- President: V Mohan Das
- CEO: Hari Gundlapalli
- Secretary: Vitesh Agarwal

Official website
- www.cricketcscs.tv
- (India)

Chhattisgarh State Cricket Sangh is the governing body of the cricket activities in the Chhattisgarh state of India and the Chhattisgarh cricket team. It is affiliated to the Board of Control for Cricket in India as full member since February 2016.

== History ==
In 2013/14, Chhattisgarh Under-16 and Under-25 teams finished at the bottom of their respective groups in the Vijay Merchant Trophy's zonal league and CK Nayudu Trophy's plate league, respectively. Their Under-19 team, however, finished third in their group in the Cooch Behar Trophy plate league and missed qualifying for the semi-finals of the lower tier by a whisker.

According to the BCCI regulations, an associate member can be promoted as a full member if the said member is an Associate Member for a continuous period of five cricketing seasons, and such a member satisfies the board that the game in its jurisdiction has reached a standard justifying its participation in the national tournament of Ranji Trophy.

Chhattisgarh along with the Sikkim Cricket Association, Manipur Cricket Association and Bihar Cricket Association are BCCI's associate members. As an associate member, CSCS gets an annual grant of Rs 75 lakh from the BCCI.

Chhattisgarh State Cricket Sangh also had a cricket academy which is affiliated to the National Cricket Academy and instructors from the NCA visits the academy at regular intervals to provide necessary guidance.

== Chhattisgarh Cricket Premier League ==
In 2024, the CSCS launched a Twenty20 franchise cricket league, the Chhattisgarh Cricket Premier League (CCPL).

== Tournaments ==
CSCS conducts an inter-district tournament for all age groups in which 19 teams - 18 districts and the Bhilai Steel Plant as an invitational team - participate annually. The tournament, with an incentive to represent the state team, has given a ray of hope to kids in the state which has been dealing with a severe Naxal threat.

== Home ground ==
Shaheed Veer Narayan Singh International Cricket Stadium in Naya Raipur is one of the 10 stadiums in the state that can host first-class games.
