= Goa Cricket Association =

Governing body of cricket in Goa state, India

- Sport: Cricket
- Jurisdiction: Goa, India
- Abbreviation: GCA
- Affiliation: Board of Control for Cricket in India
- Regional affiliation: South
- Headquarters: Goa Cricket Association Academy Ground, Porvorim
- Location: Porvorim, Goa, India
- President: Vipul Phadke
- Secretary: Rohan Gauns Dessai

Official website
- goacricketassociation.co.in
- (India)

Goa Cricket Association is the governing body of cricket activities in the Indian state of Goa and the Goa cricket team. It is affiliated to the Board of Control for Cricket in India. Suraj Lotlikar is the president of the association. GCA is registered with Registrar of Societies, Goa.

As a member of BCCI, it has the authority to select players, umpires and officials to participate in state events and exercises total control over them in Goa. Without its recognition, no competitive cricket involving GCA-contracted players can be hosted within the State of Goa and India. It owns a ground at Porvorim. It has plans to build a new stadium at Pernem.
