= Uttar Pradesh Cricket Association =

Cricket organization in Uttar Pradesh state, India

- Sport: Cricket
- Jurisdiction: Uttar Pradesh, India
- Abbreviation: UPCA
- Founded: 1928
- Affiliation: Board of Control for Cricket in India
- Affiliation date: 1928
- Headquarters: Kamla Tower, Kanpur-208001
- Location: Green Park, Kanpur, Uttar Pradesh, India
- President: Dr. Nidhipati Singhania
- Secretary: Arvind Kumar Srivastava
- Sponsor: Uflex Ltd.

Official website
- www.upca.tv
- Other key staff: Jitendra Awasthi

Uttar Pradesh Cricket Association, formerly United Provinces Cricket Team, is the governing body of the Cricket activities in the Indian state of Uttar Pradesh and the Uttar Pradesh cricket team. It is affiliated to the Board of Control for Cricket in India. Currently Smt Sushila Singhania ji, (also known as Iron Lady) is Patron of Uttar Pradesh Cricket Association.

== History ==
Vijay Anand Gajapati Raj Bahadur, better known as the Maharajkumar of Vizianagram and Sir Padampat Singhania were the founders of Uttar Pradesh Cricket Association. Sir Padampat Singhania embellished Uttar Pradesh Cricket Association's location Green Park, which was requested by the Lady Green, who used to practice horse riding during those times. The Park is maintained and augmented by the Singhania’s ever since then.

Sir Padampat Singhania was an Industrialist and a member of the Indian constituent Assembly. He was one of the youngest Federation of Indian Chambers of Commerce & Industry (FICCI) President during the year 1935-36. Sir Padampat Singhania has maintained the Green Park and have been organising matches in Kanpur, he has been consistently paying towards the match fees, prizes and has even granted a special permit to the players of both the teams to stay in their heritage property, namely, Kamla Retreat during the matches. His contribution to the cricket fraternity has been immense and Greenpark is still flourishing. JK put up their entire security, workforce, handling of the students gallery etc during all the matches.

Vijay Anand Gajapati Raj Bahadur was the founding President of Uttar Pradesh Cricket Association and Andhra Cricket Association. He was captain of the Indian cricket team in the 1930s and a cricket commentator in the 1960s. He is credited with furthering the development of cricket in Andhra and Uttar Pradesh. was the founding President of Uttar Pradesh Cricket Association and Andhra Cricket Association. He was captain of the Indian cricket team in the 1930s and a cricket commentator in the 1960s. He is credited with furthering the development of cricket in Andhra and Uttar Pradesh.

== Home grounds ==
There are currently total 2 home grounds and 2 upcoming grounds of UPCA-

- BRSABV Ekana cricket stadium (Capacity- 50,000) in Lucknow
- Green Park Stadium (Capacity- 32,000) in Kanpur
- Saifai International Cricket Stadium (Capacity- 43,000) in Etawah district (Upcoming)
- Varanasi International Cricket Stadium (Capacity- 30,000) in Varanasi (Upcoming)

== See also ==
- Ekana Cricket Stadium
- Saifai
