= 2019–20 Senior Women's T20 Trophy =

- Dates: 14 October – 10 November 2019
- Administrator: BCCI
- Cricket format: Twenty20
- Tournament format(s): Round-robin tournament and knockout
- Champions: Railways (9th title)
- Runners-up: Bengal
- Participants: 37
- Most runs: Shafali Verma (265)
- Most wickets: Nupur Kohale (11)
- Official website: bcci.tv

The 2019–20 Senior Women's T20 Trophy was the 12th edition of the women's Twenty20 cricket competition in India. It was held from 14 October to 10 November 2019. Punjab were the defending champions, but were eliminated in the league stage. Chandigarh made their debut in the tournament after the BCCI granted affiliation to the Union Territory Cricket Association.

The tournament's league stage consisted of five groups, with three groups containing seven teams and two group with eight teams. The league stage ran from 14 October to 24 October. The top two teams from each group qualified for the Super League stage of the tournament, with the teams split into two further groups of five teams. Andhra and Jharkhand from Group A, Railways and Vidarbha from Group B, Karnataka and Baroda from Group C, Himachal Pradesh and Uttar Pradesh from Group D, Bengal and Maharashtra from Group E qualified for the Super League stage. The Super League stage ran from 31 October to 6 November 2019. The top 2 teams from both groups, Bengal and Vidarbha from Super League Group A and Railways and Baroda from Super League Group B, progressed to the semi-finals. The semi-finals and final were held on 8 and 10 November 2019 respectively. In the semi-finals, Bengal beat Baroda by 6 wickets and Railways beat Uttar Pradesh by 75 runs. Both the teams progressed unbeaten to final. In the final, Railways defeated Bengal by 8 wickets to win the tournament for the 9th time.

== League stage ==
=== Points table ===
Group A

Team	P	W	L	T	NR	Pts	NRR
Andhra	6	4	0	0	2	20	+3.226
Jharkhand	6	3	1	0	2	16	+1.014
Madhya Pradesh	6	3	1	0	2	16	+1.586
Gujarat	6	2	2	0	2	12	+1.942
Assam	6	1	3	0	2	8	−0.270
Bihar	6	0	3	0	3	6	−4.763
Meghalaya	6	1	4	0	1	6	−3.585

Group B

Team	P	W	L	T	NR	Pts	NRR
Railways	6	6	0	0	0	24	+3.571
Vidarbha	6	5	1	0	0	20	+2.614
Haryana	6	3	2	0	1	14	+1.208
Rajasthan	6	3	3	0	0	12	−0.696
Odisha	6	2	4	0	0	8	−0.747
Sikkim	6	1	5	0	0	4	−3.143
Jammu and Kashmir	6	0	5	0	1	2	−2.399

Group C

Team	P	W	L	T	NR	Pts	NRR
Karnataka	6	5	1	0	0	20	+1.300
Baroda	6	4	1	0	1	18	+0.577
Mumbai	6	4	2	0	0	16	+2.431
Hyderabad	6	3	2	0	1	14	+0.491
Tripura	6	2	2	0	2	12	+0.167
Pondicherry	6	1	5	0	0	4	−2.452
Nagaland	6	0	6	0	0	0	−3.726

Group D

Team	P	W	L	T	NR	Pts	NRR
Himachal Pradesh	7	5	1	0	1	22	+1.494
Uttar Pradesh	7	4	0	0	3	22	+1.316
Punjab	7	5	2	0	0	20	+2.188
Kerala	7	4	2	0	1	18	+1.231
Chhattisgarh	7	3	4	0	0	12	+0.446
Chandigarh	7	2	4	0	1	10	−0.442
Uttarakhand	7	1	5	0	1	6	−1.084
Manipur	7	0	6	0	1	2	−5.455

Group E

Team	P	W	L	T	NR	Pts	NRR
Bengal	7	7	0	0	0	28	+2.113
Maharashtra	7	5	2	0	0	20	+1.269
Tamil Nadu	7	5	2	0	0	20	+2.197
Goa	7	4	3	0	0	16	+1.557
Delhi	7	4	3	0	0	16	+1.157
Saurashtra	7	2	5	0	0	8	+0.102
Mizoram	7	1	6	0	0	4	−3.726
Arunachal Pradesh	7	0	7	0	0	0	−6.502

- Top 2 teams from each group advanced to the Super League.

=== Fixtures ===
==== Group A ====
Round	No.	Date	Batting 1st	Batting 2nd	Venue	Result
Round-I	14-Oct-19	A1	Andhra	Bihar	RVR & JC College of Engineering Ground, Guntur	Andhra won by 106 Runs
Round-I	14-Oct-19	A2	Jharkhand	Meghalaya	JKC College Ground, Guntur	Jharkhand won by 9 Wickets
Round-I	14-Oct-19	A3	Assam	Gujarat	JKC College Ground, Guntur	Assam won by 21 Runs
Round-II	15-Oct-19	A4	Assam	Jharkhand	JKC College Ground, Guntur	Jharkhand won by 8 Wickets
Round-II	15-Oct-19	A5	Gujarat	Bihar	RVR & JC College of Engineering Ground, Guntur	Gujarat won by 89 Runs
Round-II	15-Oct-19	A6	Madhya Pradesh	Meghalaya	JKC College Ground, Guntur	Madhya Pradesh won by 68 Runs
Round-III	17-Oct-19	A7	Assam	Meghalaya	RVR & JC College of Engineering Ground, Guntur	Meghalaya won by 8 Wickets
Round-III	17-Oct-19	A8	Bihar	Madhya Pradesh	JKC College Ground, Guntur	Madhya Pradesh won by 9 Wickets
Round-III	17-Oct-19	A9	Jharkhand	Andhra	JKC College Ground, Guntur	Andhra won by 10 Wickets (VJD method)
Round-IV	18-Oct-19	A10	Andhra	Assam	JKC College Ground, Guntur	Andhra won by 5 Wickets
Round-IV	18-Oct-19	A11	Jharkhand	Madhya Pradesh	RVR & JC College of Engineering Ground, Guntur	Jharkhand won by 5 Runs
Round-IV	18-Oct-19	A12	Gujarat	Meghalaya	JKC College Ground, Guntur	Gujarat won by 77 Runs
Round-V	20-Oct-19	A13	Assam vs Bihar		JKC College Ground, Guntur	Match Abandoned
Round-V	20-Oct-19	A14	Andhra	Meghalaya	RVR & JC College of Engineering Ground, Guntur	Andhra won by 92 Runs
Round-V	20-Oct-19	A15	Gujarat	Madhya Pradesh	JKC College Ground, Guntur	Madhya Pradesh won by 7 Wickets
Round-VI	21-Oct-19	A16	Bihar vs Jharkhand		JKC College Ground, Guntur	Match Abandoned
Round-VI	21-Oct-19	A17	Andhra vs Gujarat		JKC College Ground, Guntur	Match Abandoned
Round-VI	21-Oct-19	A18	Assam vs Madhya Pradesh		RVR & JC College of Engineering Ground, Guntur	Match Abandoned
Round-VII	23-Oct-19	A19	Andhra vs Madhya Pradesh		JKC College Ground, Guntur	Match Abandoned
Round-VII	23-Oct-19	A20	Bihar vs Meghalaya		JKC College Ground, Guntur	Match Abandoned
Round-VII	23-Oct-19	A21	Gujarat vs Jharkhand		RVR & JC College of Engineering Ground, Guntur	Match Abandoned

==== Group B ====
Round	No.	Date	Batting 1st	Batting 2nd	Venue	Result
Round-I	15-Oct-19	B1	Haryana	Odisha	VCA Kalamna Ground, Nagpur	Haryana won by 23 Runs
Round-I	15-Oct-19	B2	Vidarbha	Sikkim	Vidarbha Cricket Association Ground, Nagpur	Vidarbha won by 117 Runs
Round-I	15-Oct-19	B3	Jammu and Kashmir	Railways	Vidarbha Cricket Association Ground, Nagpur	Railways won by 10 Wickets
Round-II	16-Oct-19	B4	Jammu and Kashmir	Sikkim	VCA Kalamna Ground, Nagpur	Sikkim won by 5 Wickets
Round-II	16-Oct-19	B5	Railways	Odisha	VCA Kalamna Ground, Nagpur	Railways won by 63 Runs
Round-II	16-Oct-19	B6	Vidarbha	Rajasthan	Vidarbha Cricket Association Ground, Nagpur	Vidarbha won by 63 Runs
Round-III	18-Oct-19	B7	Jammu and Kashmir	Vidarbha	VCA Kalamna Ground, Nagpur	Vidarbha won by 9 Wickets
Round-III	18-Oct-19	B8	Haryana	Sikkim	Vidarbha Cricket Association Ground, Nagpur	Haryana won by 80 Runs
Round-III	18-Oct-19	B9	Rajasthan	Odisha	Vidarbha Cricket Association Ground, Nagpur	Rajasthan won by 42 Runs
Round-IV	19-Oct-19	B10	Haryana vs Jammu and Kashmir		VCA Kalamna Ground, Nagpur	Match Abandoned
Round-IV	19-Oct-19	B11	Sikkim	Rajasthan	Vidarbha Cricket Association Ground, Nagpur	Rajasthan won by 6 Wickets
Round-IV	19-Oct-19	B12	Railways	Vidarbha	VCA Kalamna Ground, Nagpur	Railways won by 11 Runs
Round-V	21-Oct-19	B13	Haryana	Vidarbha	VCA Kalamna Ground, Nagpur	Vidarbha won by 6 Wickets
Round-V	21-Oct-19	B14	Jammu and Kashmir	Odisha	Vidarbha Cricket Association Ground, Nagpur	Odisha won by 9 Wickets
Round-V	21-Oct-19	B15	Railways	Rajasthan	Vidarbha Cricket Association Ground, Nagpur	Railways won by 88 Runs
Round-VI	22-Oct-19	B16	Railways	Haryana	VCA Kalamna Ground, Nagpur	Railways won by 17 Runs
Round-VI	22-Oct-19	B17	Odisha	Sikkim	VCA Kalamna Ground, Nagpur	Odisha won by 6 Wickets
Round-VI	22-Oct-19	B18	Rajasthan	Jammu and Kashmir	Vidarbha Cricket Association Ground, Nagpur	Rajasthan won by 43 Runs
Round-VII	24-Oct-19	B19	Rajasthan	Haryana	Vidarbha Cricket Association Ground, Nagpur	Haryana won by 8 Wickets
Round-VII	24-Oct-19	B20	Railways	Sikkim	VCA Kalamna Ground, Nagpur	Railways won by 115 Runs
Round-VII	24-Oct-19	B21	Odisha	Vidarbha	Vidarbha Cricket Association Ground, Nagpur	Vidarbha won by 6 Wickets

==== Group C ====
Round	No.	Date	Batting 1st	Batting 2nd	Venue	Result
Round-I	14-Oct-19	C1	Baroda	Hyderabad	Sachin Tendulkar Gymkhana Ground, Mumbai	Baroda won by 25 Runs
Round-I	14-Oct-19	C2	Mumbai	Tripura	Bandra Kurla Complex Ground, Mumbai	Mumbai won by 51 Runs
Round-I	14-Oct-19	C3	Pondicherry	Karnataka	Bandra Kurla Complex Ground, Mumbai	Karnataka won by 8 Wickets
Round-II	15-Oct-19	C4	Mumbai	Pondicherry	Sachin Tendulkar Gymkhana Ground, Mumbai	Mumbai won by 73 Runs
Round-II	15-Oct-19	C5	Hyderabad	Karnataka	Bandra Kurla Complex Ground, Mumbai	Karnataka won by 8 Wickets
Round-II	15-Oct-19	C6	Tripura	Nagaland	Sachin Tendulkar Gymkhana Ground, Mumbai	Tripura won by 74 Runs
Round-III	17-Oct-19	C7	Tripura	Pondicherry	Sachin Tendulkar Gymkhana Ground, Mumbai	Tripura won by 20 Runs
Round-III	17-Oct-19	C8	Nagaland	Hyderabad	Bandra Kurla Complex Ground, Mumbai	Hyderabad won by 8 Wickets
Round-III	17-Oct-19	C9	Mumbai	Baroda	Bandra Kurla Complex Ground, Mumbai	Mumbai won by 53 Runs
Round-IV	18-Oct-19	C10	Pondicherry	Baroda	Sachin Tendulkar Gymkhana Ground, Mumbai	Baroda won by 9 Wickets
Round-IV	18-Oct-19	C11	Mumbai	Nagaland	Bandra Kurla Complex Ground, Mumbai	Mumbai won by 115 Runs
Round-IV	18-Oct-19	C12	Tripura	Karnataka	Sachin Tendulkar Gymkhana Ground, Mumbai	Karnataka won by 6 Wickets
Round-V	20-Oct-19	C13	Baroda vs Tripura		Bandra Kurla Complex Ground, Mumbai	Match Abandoned
Round-V	20-Oct-19	C14	Nagaland	Karnataka	Sachin Tendulkar Gymkhana Ground, Mumbai	Karnataka won by 10 Wickets
Round-V	20-Oct-19	C15	Pondicherry	Hyderabad	Sachin Tendulkar Gymkhana Ground, Mumbai	Hyderabad won by 10 Wickets
Round-VI	22-Oct-19	C16	Baroda	Karnataka	Bandra Kurla Complex Ground, Mumbai	Baroda won by 33 Runs
Round-VI	22-Oct-19	C17	Pondicherry	Nagaland	Sachin Tendulkar Gymkhana Ground, Mumbai	Pondicherry won by 58 Runs
Round-VI	22-Oct-19	C18	Mumbai	Hyderabad	Bandra Kurla Complex Ground, Mumbai	Hyderabad won by 4 Wickets
Round-VII	23-Oct-19	C19	Hyderabad vs Tripura		Sachin Tendulkar Gymkhana Ground, Mumbai	Match Abandoned
Round-VII	23-Oct-19	C20	Mumbai	Karnataka	Bandra Kurla Complex Ground, Mumbai	Karnataka won by 6 Wickets
Round-VII	23-Oct-19	C21	Nagaland	Baroda	Sachin Tendulkar Gymkhana Ground, Mumbai	Baroda won by 7 Wickets

==== Group D ====
Round	No.	Date	Batting 1st	Batting 2nd	Venue	Result
Round-I	14-Oct-19	D1	Uttar Pradesh	Himachal Pradesh	Shaheed Veer Narayan Singh International Cricket Stadium, Naya Raipur	Uttar Pradesh won by 6 Runs
Round-I	14-Oct-19	D2	Manipur	Uttarakhand	RDCA Ground, Raipur	Uttarakhand won by 9 Wickets
Round-I	14-Oct-19	D3	Chandigarh	Chhattisgarh	RDCA Ground, Raipur	Chhattisgarh won by 9 Wickets
Round-I	14-Oct-19	D4	Kerala	Punjab	Shaheed Veer Narayan Singh International Cricket Stadium, Naya Raipur	Punjab won by 8 Wickets
Round-II	15-Oct-19	D5	Punjab	Chhattisgarh	RDCA Ground, Raipur	Punjab won by 43 Runs
Round-II	15-Oct-19	D6	Kerala	Uttarakhand	Shaheed Veer Narayan Singh International Cricket Stadium, Naya Raipur	Kerala won by 18 Runs
Round-II	15-Oct-19	D7	Chandigarh	Himachal Pradesh	RDCA Ground, Raipur	Himachal Pradesh won by 9 Wickets
Round-II	15-Oct-19	D8	Manipur	Uttar Pradesh	Shaheed Veer Narayan Singh International Cricket Stadium, Naya Raipur	Uttar Pradesh won by 10 Wickets
Round-III	17-Oct-19	D9	Uttarakhand	Chandigarh	Shaheed Veer Narayan Singh International Cricket Stadium, Naya Raipur	Chandigarh won by 8 Wickets
Round-III	17-Oct-19	D10	Himachal Pradesh	Kerala	RDCA Ground, Raipur	Himachal Pradesh won by 68 Runs
Round-III	17-Oct-19	D11	Manipur	Chhattisgarh	RDCA Ground, Raipur	Chhattisgarh won by 8 Wickets
Round-III	17-Oct-19	D12	Punjab	Uttar Pradesh	Shaheed Veer Narayan Singh International Cricket Stadium, Naya Raipur	Uttar Pradesh won by 6 Wickets
Round-IV	18-Oct-19	D13	Chhattisgarh	Uttarakhand	RDCA Ground, Raipur	Chhattisgarh won by 48 Runs
Round-IV	18-Oct-19	D14	Punjab	Himachal Pradesh	Shaheed Veer Narayan Singh International Cricket Stadium, Naya Raipur	Himachal Pradesh won by 8 Wickets (VJD Method)
Round-IV	18-Oct-19	D15	Chandigarh	Manipur	Shaheed Veer Narayan Singh International Cricket Stadium, Naya Raipur	Chandigarh won by 71 Runs
Round-IV	18-Oct-19	D16	Kerala	Uttar Pradesh	RDCA Ground, Raipur	No Result
Round-V	20-Oct-19	D17	Chandigarh vs Uttar Pradesh		RDCA Ground, Raipur	Match Abandoned
Round-V	20-Oct-19	D18	Kerala	Manipur	Shaheed Veer Narayan Singh International Cricket Stadium, Naya Raipur	Kerala won by 140 Runs
Round-V	20-Oct-19	D19	Chhattisgarh	Himachal Pradesh	Shaheed Veer Narayan Singh International Cricket Stadium, Naya Raipur	Himachal Pradesh won by 6 Wickets (VJD Method)
Round-V	20-Oct-19	D20	Punjab	Uttarakhand	RDCA Ground, Raipur	Punjab won by 53 Runs
Round-VI	21-Oct-19	D21	Punjab	Chandigarh	Shaheed Veer Narayan Singh International Cricket Stadium, Naya Raipur	Punjab won by 17 Runs
Round-VI	21-Oct-19	D22	Himachal Pradesh vs Manipur		RDCA Ground, Raipur	Match Abandoned
Round-VI	21-Oct-19	D23	Kerala	Chhattisgarh	Shaheed Veer Narayan Singh International Cricket Stadium, Naya Raipur	Kerala won by 35 Runs
Round-VI	21-Oct-19	D24	Uttarakhand vs Uttar Pradesh		RDCA Ground, Raipur	Match Abandoned
Round-VII	23-Oct-19	D25	Uttar Pradesh	Chhattisgarh	Shaheed Veer Narayan Singh International Cricket Stadium, Naya Raipur	Match Tied (Uttar Pradesh won the Super over)
Round-VII	23-Oct-19	D26	Kerala	Chandigarh	RDCA Ground, Raipur	Kerala won by 54 Runs
Round-VII	23-Oct-19	D27	Uttarakhand	Himachal Pradesh	Shaheed Veer Narayan Singh International Cricket Stadium, Naya Raipur	Himachal Pradesh won by 8 Wickets
Round-VII	23-Oct-19	D28	Manipur	Punjab	RDCA Ground, Raipur	Punjab won by 9 Wickets

==== Group E ====
Round	No.	Date	Batting 1st	Batting 2nd	Venue	Result
Round-I	14-Oct-19	E1	Tamil Nadu	Mizoram	Saurashtra Cricket Association Stadium B, Rajkot	Tamil Nadu won by 159 Runs
Round-I	14-Oct-19	E2	Saurashtra	Goa	Saurashtra Cricket Association Stadium, Rajkot	Goa won by 8 Wickets
Round-I	14-Oct-19	E3	Arunachal Pradesh	Bengal	Saurashtra Cricket Association Stadium, Rajkot	Bengal won by 10 Wickets
Round-I	14-Oct-19	E4	Maharashtra	Delhi	Saurashtra Cricket Association Stadium B, Rajkot	Maharashtra won by 10 Runs
Round-II	15-Oct-19	E5	Arunachal Pradesh	Maharashtra	Saurashtra Cricket Association Stadium, Rajkot	Maharashtra won by 10 Wickets
Round-II	15-Oct-19	E6	Delhi	Saurashtra	Saurashtra Cricket Association Stadium B, Rajkot	Delhi won by 41 Runs
Round-II	15-Oct-19	E7	Mizoram	Bengal	Saurashtra Cricket Association Stadium, Rajkot	Bengal won by 9 Wickets
Round-II	15-Oct-19	E8	Tamil Nadu	Goa	Saurashtra Cricket Association Stadium B, Rajkot	Tamil Nadu won by 9 Runs
Round-III	17-Oct-19	E9	Saurashtra	Bengal	Saurashtra Cricket Association Stadium B, Rajkot	Bengal won by 9 Wickets
Round-III	17-Oct-19	E10	Delhi	Mizoram	Saurashtra Cricket Association Stadium, Rajkot	Delhi won by 89 Runs
Round-III	17-Oct-19	E11	Goa	Arunachal Pradesh	Saurashtra Cricket Association Stadium, Rajkot	Goa won by 183 Runs
Round-III	17-Oct-19	E12	Tamil Nadu	Maharashtra	Saurashtra Cricket Association Stadium B, Rajkot	Maharashtra won by 3 Wickets
Round-IV	18-Oct-19	E13	Saurashtra	Arunachal Pradesh	Saurashtra Cricket Association Stadium, Rajkot	Saurashtra won by 10 Wickets
Round-IV	18-Oct-19	E14	Maharashtra	Mizoram	Saurashtra Cricket Association Stadium B, Rajkot	Maharashtra won by 75 Runs
Round-IV	18-Oct-19	E15	Goa	Bengal	Saurashtra Cricket Association Stadium B, Rajkot	Bengal won by 4 Wickets
Round-IV	18-Oct-19	E16	Delhi	Tamil Nadu	Saurashtra Cricket Association Stadium, Rajkot	Tamil Nadu won by 8 Wickets
Round-V	20-Oct-19	E17	Bengal	Tamil Nadu	Saurashtra Cricket Association Stadium, Rajkot	Bengal won by 5 Wickets
Round-V	20-Oct-19	E18	Delhi	Goa	Saurashtra Cricket Association Stadium B, Rajkot	Delhi won by 31 Runs
Round-V	20-Oct-19	E19	Arunachal Pradesh	Mizoram	Saurashtra Cricket Association Stadium B, Rajkot	Mizoram won by 7 Wickets
Round-V	20-Oct-19	E20	Saurashtra	Maharashtra	Saurashtra Cricket Association Stadium, Rajkot	Maharashtra won by 4 Wickets
Round-VI	21-Oct-19	E21	Maharashtra	Bengal	Saurashtra Cricket Association Stadium B, Rajkot	Bengal won by 4 Wickets
Round-VI	21-Oct-19	E22	Mizoram	Goa	Saurashtra Cricket Association Stadium, Rajkot	Goa won by 9 Wickets
Round-VI	21-Oct-19	E23	Arunachal Pradesh	Delhi	Saurashtra Cricket Association Stadium, Rajkot	Delhi won by 9 Wickets
Round-VI	21-Oct-19	E24	Saurashtra	Tamil Nadu	Saurashtra Cricket Association Stadium, Rajkot	Tamil Nadu won by 4 Wickets
Round-VII	23-Oct-19	E25	Tamil Nadu	Arunachal Pradesh	Saurashtra Cricket Association Stadium B, Rajkot	Tamil Nadu won by 133 Runs
Round-VII	23-Oct-19	E26	Bengal	Delhi	Saurashtra Cricket Association Stadium, Rajkot	Bengal won by 60 Runs
Round-VII	23-Oct-19	E27	Mizoram	Saurashtra	Saurashtra Cricket Association Stadium B, Rajkot	Saurashtra won by 10 Wickets
Round-VII	23-Oct-19	E28	Maharashtra	Goa	Saurashtra Cricket Association Stadium, Rajkot	Goa won by 4 Wickets

== Super League Stage ==
=== Points table ===
Super League Group A

Team	P	W	L	T	NR	Pts	NRR
Bengal (E1)	4	4	0	0	0	16	+1.325
Vidarbha (B2)	4	2	2	0	0	8	+0.150
Uttar Pradesh (D2)	4	2	2	0	0	8	+0.175
Karnataka (C1)	4	1	3	0	0	4	−0.852
Andhra (A1)	4	1	3	0	0	4	−1.054

Super League Group B

Team	P	W	L	T	NR	Pts	NRR
Railways (B1)	4	4	0	0	0	16	+2.802
Baroda (C2)	4	3	1	0	0	12	+0.137
Himachal Pradesh (D1)	4	2	2	0	0	8	−0.513
Maharashtra (E2)	4	1	3	0	0	4	−0.512
Jharkhand (A2)	4	0	4	0	0	0	−1.583

- Top team from both the groups advanced to the semi-finals.

=== Fixtures ===
==== Super League Group A ====
Round	No.	Date	Batting 1st	Batting 2nd	Venue	Result
Round-I	SLA1	31 October	Bengal; 133/4	Karnataka; 77	Devineni Venkata Ramana Praneetha Ground, Mulapadu	Bengal won by 56 Runs
Round-I	SLA2	31 October	Vidarbha; 93/6	Andhra; 98/5	Devineni Venkata Ramana Praneetha Ground, Mulapadu	Andhra won by 5 Wickets
Round-II	SLA3	1 November	Vidarbha; 106/7	Uttar Pradesh; 104/5	Devineni Venkata Ramana Praneetha Ground, Mulapadu	Vidarbha won by 2 Runs
Round-II	SLA4	1 November	Bengal; 106/8	Andhra; 94/8	Devineni Venkata Ramana Praneetha Ground, Mulapadu	Bengal won by 12 Runs
Round-III	SLA5	3 November	Andhra; 96/5	Karnataka; 100/1	Devineni Venkata Ramana Praneetha Ground, Mulapadu	Karnataka won by 9 Wickets
Round-III	SLA6	3 November	Bengal; 129/5	Uttar Pradesh; 98/9	Devineni Venkata Ramana Praneetha Ground, Mulapadu	Bengal won by 31 Runs
Round-IV	SLA7	4 November	Andhra; 98/9	Uttar Pradesh; 117/8	Devineni Venkata Ramana Praneetha Ground, Mulapadu	Uttar Pradesh won by 19 Runs
Round-IV	SLA8	4 November	Karnataka; 70	Vidarbha; 74/7	Devineni Venkata Ramana Praneetha Ground, Mulapadu	Vidarbha won by 3 Wickets
Round-V	SLA9	6 November	Bengal; 108/8	Vidarbha; 101	Devineni Venkata Ramana Praneetha Ground, Mulapadu	Bengal won by 7 Runs
Round-V	SLA10	6 November	Uttar Pradesh; 75/9	Karnataka; 47	Devineni Venkata Ramana Praneetha Ground, Mulapadu	Uttar Pradesh won by 28 Runs

==== Super League Group B ====
Round	No.	Date	Batting 1st	Batting 2nd	Venue	Result
Round-I	SLB1	31 October	Baroda; 120/6	Maharashtra; 102/6	Chukkapalli Pitchaiah Cricket Ground, Mulapadu	Baroda won by 18 Runs
Round-I	SLB2	31 October	Railways; 129/1	Jharkhand; 58/7	Chukkapalli Pitchaiah Cricket Ground, Mulapadu	Railways won by 71 Runs
Round-II	SLB3	1 November	Railways; 153/2	Himachal Pradesh; 86	Chukkapalli Pitchaiah Cricket Ground, Mulapadu	Railways won by 67 Runs
Round-II	SLB4	1 November	Maharashtra; 81	Jharkhand; 79/8	Chukkapalli Pitchaiah Cricket Ground, Mulapadu	Maharashtra won by 2 Runs
Round-III	SLB5	3 November	Jharkhand; 99/9	Baroda; 100/6	Chukkapalli Pitchaiah Cricket Ground, Mulapadu	Baroda won by 4 Wickets
Round-III	SLB6	3 November	Himachal Pradesh; 117/4 & (SO: 4)	Maharashtra; 117/5 & (SO: 4)	Chukkapalli Pitchaiah Cricket Ground, Mulapadu	Match Tied (Super Over tied. Himachal won on boundary countback)
Round-IV	SLB7	4 November	Himachal Pradesh; 117/9	Jharkhand; 81	Chukkapalli Pitchaiah Cricket Ground, Mulapadu	Himachal Pradesh won by 36 Runs
Round-IV	SLB8	4 November	Baroda; 87/8	Railways; 90/0	Chukkapalli Pitchaiah Cricket Ground, Mulapadu	Railways won by 10 Wickets
Round-V	SLB9	6 November	Maharashtra; 98/6	Railways; 101/3	Chukkapalli Pitchaiah Cricket Ground, Mulapadu	Railways won by 7 Wickets
Round-V	SLB10	6 November	Baroda; 82/7	Himachal Pradesh; 72	Chukkapalli Pitchaiah Cricket Ground, Mulapadu	Baroda won by 10 Runs

== Knockout stage ==
=== Semi-finals ===
8 November 2019
Scorecard

Baroda; 88/9 (20 overs)	v	Bengal; 92/4 (18.4 overs)
Yastika Bhatia 22; Mita Paul 2/17 (4 overs)		Mandira Mahapatra 27*; Jaya Mohite 2/13

Bengal won by 6 wickets
Gokaraju Liala Gangaaraju ACA Cricket Ground, Mulapadu
Umpires: Amit Bansal, Subrat Das and Somnath Jha (3rd Umpire)

- Baroda won the toss and elected to bat.

8 November 2019
Scorecard

Railways; 139/5 (20 overs)	v	Vidarbha; 64 (18.1 overs)
Sheral Rozario 66; Nupur Kohale 3/11 (4 overs)		Disha Kasat 21; Preeti Bose 3/11

Railways won by 75 runs
Gokaraju Liala Gangaaraju ACA Cricket Ground, Mulapadu
Umpires: Amit Bansal, Subrat Das and Somnath Jha (3rd Umpire)

- Railways won the toss and elected to bat.

=== Final ===
10 November 2019
Scorecard

Bengal; 121/6 (20 overs)	v	Railways; 123/2 (18.1 overs)
Rumeli Dhar 48 (41); Ekta Bisht 2/14 (4 overs)		Punam Raut 46* (44); Shrayosi Aich 1/33 (4 overs)

Railways won by 8 wickets
Gokaraju Liala Gangaaraju ACA Cricket Ground, Mulapadu
Umpires: Amit Bansal, Subrat Das and Somnath Jha (3rd Umpire)

- Bengal won the toss and elected to bat.
