= 2021–22 Senior Women's Challenger Trophy =

Domestic cricket tournament

- Dates: 4 – 9 December 2021
- Administrator(s): Board of Control for Cricket in India
- Cricket format: List A (50 overs)
- Tournament format(s): Round-robin and Final
- Host(s): India
- Champions: India A (1st title)
- Runners-up: India D
- Participants: 4
- Matches: 7
- Most runs: Sabbhineni Meghana (207)
- Most wickets: Chandu Venkateshappa (10)

The 2021–22 Senior Women's Challenger Trophy was the tenth edition of the Senior Women's Challenger Trophy, a women's limited overs competition in India. It took place from 4 to 9 December 2021. The tournament featured four teams, India A, India B, India C and India D, made up of the best players from across India. India A won the tournament, beating India D by three wickets in the final.

== Competition format ==
The four teams played in a round-robin group, playing each other team once, with the top two advancing to the final. Matches were played using a 50 over format.

The group worked on a points system with positions within the group being based on the total points. Points were awarded as follows:

Win: 4 points.
Tie: 2 points.
Loss: 0 points.
No Result/Abandoned: 2 points.

If points in the final table were equal, teams were separated by their Net Run Rate.

== Squads ==
India A	India B	India C	India D
Sneh Rana (c); Anusha Bareddy; Yastika Bhatia; Sushree Dibyadarshini; Simran Dil Bahadur; Vrinda Dinesh; Challa Jhansi Lakshmi; Sonal Kalal; Disha Kasat; Mehak Kesar; Shivali Shinde (wk); Renuka Singh; Maya Sonawane; Ganga Waikhom; Lakshmi Yadav (wk)	Taniya Bhatia (c) (wk); Riya Chaudhary (wk); Harleen Deol; Sarla Devi; Rashi Kanojiya; Humeira Kazi; Palak Patel; Kesava Ramyashri; Shubha Satish; Meghna Singh; Saima Thakoor; Soumya Tiwari; Anju Tomar; Gongadi Trisha; Chandu Venkateshappa	Shikha Pandey (c); Arti Devi; Priyanka Garkhede; Kashvee Gautam; Shipra Giri (wk); Dhara Gujjar; Muskan Malik; Tarannum Pathan; Challuru Prathyusha; Priya Punia; Rizu Saha; Aishwarya Singh; Anushka Sharma; Sweta Verma (wk); Radha Yadav	Pooja Vastrakar (c); Kanika Ahuja; Gnanananda Divya; Rajeshwari Gayakwad; Saika Ishaque; Keerthi James; Amanjot Kaur; Ashwini Kumari; Sabbhineni Meghana; Sanjula Naik; Monica Patel; Kumar Prathyoosha (wk); Pooja Raj; Indrani Roy (wk); Ayushi Soni

== Standings ==
Team	P	W	L	T	NR	Pts	NRR
India D (Q)	3	3	0	0	0	12	+0.720
India A (Q)	3	1	2	0	0	4	–0.083
India C	3	1	2	0	0	4	–0.219
India B	3	1	2	0	0	4	–0.422

Source: BCCI

== Fixtures ==
=== Group stage ===
4 December 2021
Scorecard

India A 234 (50 overs)	v	India B 237/3 (48.5 overs)
Yastika Bhatia 81 (81); Chandu Venkateshappa 3/30 (9 overs)		Palak Patel 79 (124); Simran Dil Bahadur 2/39 (9.5 overs)

India B won by 7 wickets
ACA–KDCA Cricket Ground, Mulapadu
Umpires: Swaroopanand Kannur and Parashar Joshi

- India B won the toss and elected to field.

4 December 2021
Scorecard

India D 251/8 (50 overs)	v	India C 211 (49.2 overs)
Sabbhineni Meghana 60 (73); Radha Yadav 3/47 (10 overs)		Shipra Giri 43 (71); Kanika Ahuja 4/37 (10 overs)

India D won by 40 runs
ACA–KDCA Cricket Ground, Mulapadu
Umpires: Ramesh Kumar and K Raghuram

- India D won the toss and elected to bat.

5 December 2021
Scorecard

India C 205 (47.1 overs)	v	India A 206/5 (46.1 overs)
Radha Yadav 82 (98); Sneh Rana 3/32 (8.1 overs)		Sneh Rana 59 (75); Shikha Pandey 1/26 (9 overs)

India A won by 5 wickets
ACA–KDCA Cricket Ground, Mulapadu
Umpires: Swaroopanand Kannur and Akshay Marathe

- India C won the toss and elected to bat.

5 December 2021
Scorecard

India D 230 (48.5 overs)	v	India B 184 (50 overs)
Sabbhineni Meghana 102 (86); Sarla Devi 2/24 (4 overs)		Harleen Deol 73 (86); Pooja Vastrakar 3/37 (10 overs)

India D won by 46 runs
ACA–KDCA Cricket Ground, Mulapadu
Umpires: Ramesh Kumar and MM Srinivasarangan

- India B won the toss and elected to field.

7 December 2021
Scorecard

India D 219/7 (50 overs)	v	India A 197/7 (50 overs)
Pooja Vastrakar 96 (96); Renuka Singh 3/47 (10 overs)		Disha Kasat 51 (73); Saika Ishaque 2/31 (10 overs)

India D won by 22 runs
ACA–KDCA Cricket Ground, Mulapadu
Umpires: Akshay Marathe and Parashar Joshi

- India A won the toss and elected to field.

7 December 2021
Scorecard

India C 212 (48.2 overs)	v	India B 187/8 (50 overs)
Anushka Sharma 63 (91); Chandu Venkateshappa 5/40 (10 overs)		Harleen Deol 46 (69); Tarannum Pathan 4/39 (10 overs)

India C won by 25 runs
ACA–KDCA Cricket Ground, Mulapadu
Umpires: K Raghuram and MM Srinivasarangan

- India B won the toss and elected to field.

=== Final ===
9 December 2021
Scorecard

India D 219/8 (50 overs)	v	India A 224/7 (45.4 overs)
Amanjot Kaur 55* (74); Disha Kasat 3/39 (8 overs)		Yastika Bhatia 86 (102); Rajeshwari Gayakwad 4/36 (10 overs)

India A won by 3 wickets
ACA–KDCA Cricket Ground, Mulapadu
Umpires: Swaroopanand Kannur and Ramesh Kumar

- India A won the toss and elected to field.

== Statistics ==
=== Most runs ===
Player	Team	Matches	Innings	Runs	Average	HS	100s	50s
Sabbhineni Meghana	India D	4	4	207	51.75	102	1	1
Yastika Bhatia	India A	4	4	199	49.75	86	0	2
Harleen Deol	India B	3	3	181	60.33	73	0	2
Pooja Vastrakar	India D	4	4	161	53.67	96	0	2
Disha Kasat	India A	4	4	153	38.25	53	0	2

Source: BCCI

=== Most wickets ===
Player	Team	Overs	Wickets	Average	BBI	5w
Chandu Venkateshappa	India B	27.5	10	11.00	5/40	1
Kanika Ahuja	India D	36.0	8	18.62	4/37	0
Rajeshwari Gayakwad	India D	36.2	7	16.14	4/36	0
Tarannum Pathan	India C	25.0	7	19.28	4/39	0
Simran Dil Bahadur	India A	33.5	7	19.85	3/37	0

Source: BCCI
