= 2018–19 Senior Women's One Day League =

- Dates: 1 – 31 December 2018
- Administrator: BCCI
- Cricket format: List A
- Tournament format(s): Round-robin and knockout
- Champions: Bengal (1st title)
- Runners-up: Andhra
- Participants: 36
- Matches: 151
- Most runs: Deepti Sharma (487)
- Most wickets: Tarannum Pathan (24)
- Official website: bcci.tv

The 2018–19 Senior Women's One Day League was the 13th edition of the women's List A cricket competition in India. It was played from 1 to 31 December 2018 in a round-robin format, with 36 teams divided in 4 groups. Bengal won the tournament, beating Andhra in the final by 10 runs. This was only the second time in 13 editions that Railways did not win the tournament. Himachal Pradesh and Odisha gained promotion from Elite Group C, whilst Uttarakhand gained promotion from the Plate Group.

The tournament's scheduling conflict with Ranji Trophy led to a shortage of umpire and match officials. The knockouts for the competition were therefore delayed and moved from 24–29 December to 26–31 December.

== Competition format ==
The 36 teams competing in the tournament were divided into the Elite Group and the Plate Group, with the 27 teams in the Elite Group further divided into Groups A, B and C and the 10 remained teams competing in one Plate Group. The tournament operated on a round-robin format, with each team playing every other team in their group once. At the end of the group stage, the Elite Group A and Elite Group B tables were combined, with the top five in the combined table progressing to the quarter-finals, joined by the top two teams from Elite Group C and the top team from the Plate Group. The top two teams from Elite Group C were also promoted to Elite Group A/B for the following season, with the bottom two teams from the combined table relegated. The winner of the Plate Group was also promoted, with the bottom team from Elite Group C relegated. Matches were played using a 50 over format.

The groups worked on a points system with positions with the groups being based on the total points. Points were awarded as follows:

Win: 4 points.
Tie: 2 points.
Loss: 0 points.
No Result/Abandoned: 2 points.

If points in the final table are equal, teams are separated by most wins, then head-to-head record, then Net Run Rate.

== League stage ==
=== Points tables ===
==== Elite Group A/B Combined Table ====
Team	Gr	P	W	L	T	NR	Pts	NRR
Railways	A	8	7	0	0	1	30	+2.205
Andhra	A	8	7	1	0	0	28	+0.453
Mumbai	B	8	6	2	0	0	24	+0.822
Bengal	B	8	6	2	0	0	24	+1.208
Baroda	B	8	6	2	0	0	24	+0.296
Delhi	B	8	5	3	0	0	20	+0.679
Punjab	A	8	5	3	0	0	20	+0.259
Karnataka	B	8	4	4	0	0	16	+0.064
Vidarbha	A	8	4	4	0	0	16	–0.320
Tamil Nadu	B	8	4	4	0	0	16	–0.382
Chhattisgarh	A	8	3	4	0	1	14	–0.220
Goa	A	8	3	5	0	0	12	–0.941
Maharashtra	A	8	3	5	0	0	12	+0.701
Kerala	B	8	3	5	0	0	12	–0.308
Haryana	A	8	2	5	0	1	10	+0.485
Tripura	B	8	2	6	0	0	8	–0.632
Saurashtra	A	8	0	7	0	1	2	–1.703
Gujarat	B	8	0	8	0	0	0	–1.568

==== Elite Group C ====
Team	P	W	L	T	NR	Pts	NRR
Himachal Pradesh	8	8	0	0	0	32	+1.322
Odisha	8	5	3	0	0	20	+0.076
Uttar Pradesh	8	5	3	0	0	20	+0.417
Madhya Pradesh	8	4	3	0	1	18	+0.660
Hyderabad	8	4	3	0	1	18	+0.340
Jharkhand	8	4	3	0	1	18	+0.700
Assam	8	3	5	0	0	12	–0.664
Rajasthan	8	1	7	0	0	4	–1.036
Jammu and Kashmir	8	0	7	0	1	2	–1.874

==== Plate Group ====
Team	P	W	L	T	NR	Pts	NRR
Uttarakhand	8	7	1	0	0	28	+1.889
Pondicherry	8	7	1	0	0	28	+1.548
Meghalaya	8	5	1	1	1	24	+1.737
Nagaland	8	5	3	0	0	20	+0.654
Manipur	8	4	3	0	1	18	+1.018
Sikkim	8	2	5	1	0	10	+0.186
Bihar	8	2	6	0	0	8	–0.512
Arunachal Pradesh	8	1	7	0	0	4	–3.021
Mizoram	8	1	7	0	0	4	–3.061

- Advanced to Quarter-finals
- Relegated

=== Fixtures ===
==== Elite Group A ====
Round	No.	Date	Home team	Away team	Venue	Result
Round 1	A1	1 December	Chhattisgarh	Maharashtra	Devineni Venkata Ramana Praneetha Ground, Mulapadu	Maharashtra won by 5 wickets
Round 1	A2	1 December	Andhra	Punjab	JKC College Cricket Ground, Guntur	Andhra won by 6 wickets
Round 1	A3	1 December	Goa	Railways	Chukkapalli Pitchaiah Cricket Ground, Mulapadu	Railways won by 172 runs
Round 2	A4	2 December	Haryana	Maharashtra	Chukkapalli Pitchaiah Cricket Ground, Mulapadu	Maharashtra won by 183 runs
Round 2	A5	2 December	Andhra	Vidarbha	JKC College Cricket Ground, Guntur	Andhra won by 17 runs
Round 2	A6	2 December	Goa	Saurashtra	Devineni Venkata Ramana Praneetha Ground, Mulapadu	Goa won by 8 wickets
Round 3	A7	3 December	Haryana	Punjab	Devineni Venkata Ramana Praneetha Ground, Mulapadu	Punjab won by 5 wickets
Round 3	A8	3 December	Railways	Vidarbha	JKC College Cricket Ground, Guntur	Railways won by 137 runs
Round 3	A9	3 December	Chhattisgarh	Saurashtra	Chukkapalli Pitchaiah Cricket Ground, Mulapadu	Chhattisgarh won by 50 runs
Round 4	A10	5 December	Maharashtra	Railways	JKC College Cricket Ground, Guntur	Railways won by 52 runs
Round 4	A11	5 December	Chhattisgarh	Goa	Devineni Venkata Ramana Praneetha Ground, Mulapadu	Chhattisgarh won by 26 runs
Round 4	A12	5 December	Punjab	Saurashtra	Chukkapalli Pitchaiah Cricket Ground, Mulapadu	Punjab won by 91 runs
Round 5	A13	6 December	Andhra	Railways	JKC College Cricket Ground, Guntur	Railways won by 8 wickets
Round 5	A14	6 December	Chhattisgarh	Haryana	Chukkapalli Pitchaiah Cricket Ground, Mulapadu	Chhattisgarh won by 10 wickets
Round 5	A15	6 December	Punjab	Vidarbha	Devineni Venkata Ramana Praneetha Ground, Mulapadu	Punjab won by 41 runs
Round 6	A16	8 December	Goa	Vidarbha	Chukkapalli Pitchaiah Cricket Ground, Mulapadu	Vidarbha won by 77 runs
Round 6	A17	8 December	Maharashtra	Saurashtra	Devineni Venkata Ramana Praneetha Ground, Mulapadu	Maharashtra won by 7 wickets
Round 6	A18	8 December	Andhra	Haryana	JKC College Cricket Ground, Guntur	Andhra won by 6 runs
Round 7	A19	10 December	Andhra	Chhattisgarh	JKC College Cricket Ground, Guntur	Andhra won by 2 wickets
Round 7	A20	10 December	Goa	Maharashtra	Devineni Venkata Ramana Praneetha Ground, Mulapadu	Goa won by 12 runs
Round 7	A21	10 December	Punjab	Railways	Chukkapalli Pitchaiah Cricket Ground, Mulapadu	Railways won by 9 wickets
Round 8	A22	12 December	Goa	Punjab	Chukkapalli Pitchaiah Cricket Ground, Mulapadu	Goa won by 8 wickets
Round 8	A23	12 December	Andhra	Saurashtra	JKC College Cricket Ground, Guntur	Andhra won by 62 runs
Round 8	A24	12 December	Haryana	Vidarbha	Devineni Venkata Ramana Praneetha Ground, Mulapadu	Haryana won by 5 wickets
Round 9	A25	14 December	Railways	Saurashtra	Chukkapalli Pitchaiah Cricket Ground, Mulapadu	Railways won by 163 runs
Round 9	A26	14 December	Chhattisgarh	Punjab	JKC College Cricket Ground, Guntur	Punjab won by 46 runs
Round 9	A27	14 December	Maharashtra	Vidarbha	Devineni Venkata Ramana Praneetha Ground, Mulapadu	Vidarbha won by 3 wickets
Round 10	A28	16 December	Andhra	Goa	JKC College Cricket Ground, Guntur	Andhra won by 7 wickets (VJD Method)
Round 10	A29	16 December	Haryana	Saurashtra	Devineni Venkata Ramana Praneetha Ground, Mulapadu	No Result
Round 10	A30	16 December	Chhattisgarh	Railways	Chukkapalli Pitchaiah Cricket Ground, Mulapadu	No Result
Round 11	A31	18 December	Saurashtra	Vidarbha	Devineni Venkata Ramana Praneetha Ground, Mulapadu	Vidarbha won by 8 wickets
Round 11	A32	18 December	Maharashtra	Punjab	Chukkapalli Pitchaiah Cricket Ground, Mulapadu	Punjab won by 3 wickets
Round 11	A33	18 December	Goa	Haryana	JKC College Cricket Ground, Guntur	Haryana won by 51 runs
Round 12	A34	20 December	Chhattisgarh	Vidarbha	Devineni Venkata Ramana Praneetha Ground, Mulapadu	Vidarbha won by 4 wickets
Round 12	A35	20 December	Haryana	Railways	Chukkapalli Pitchaiah Cricket Ground, Mulapadu	Railways won by 6 wickets
Round 12	A36	20 December	Andhra	Maharashtra	JKC College Cricket Ground, Guntur	Andhra won by 8 wickets

==== Elite Group B ====
Round	No.	Date	Home team	Away team	Venue	Result
Round 1	B1	1 December	Bengal	Karnataka	M. Chinnaswamy Stadium, Bengaluru	Bengal won by 8 wickets
Round 1	B2	1 December	Baroda	Kerala	KSCA Alur Cricket Ground, Bengaluru	Baroda won by 7 wickets
Round 1	B3	1 December	Delhi	Mumbai	KSCA Alur Cricket Ground-II, Bengaluru	Delhi won by 5 wickets
Round 2	B4	2 December	Gujarat	Karnataka	M. Chinnaswamy Stadium, Bengaluru	Karnataka won by 4 wickets
Round 2	B5	2 December	Baroda	Tripura	KSCA Alur Cricket Ground-III, Bengaluru	Baroda won by 57 runs
Round 2	B6	2 December	Delhi	Tamil Nadu	KSCA Alur Cricket Ground, Bengaluru	Delhi won by 118 runs
Round 3	B7	3 December	Gujarat	Kerala	KSCA Alur Cricket Ground-II, Bengaluru	Kerala won by 6 wickets
Round 3	B8	3 December	Mumbai	Tripura	KSCA Alur Cricket Ground-III, Bengaluru	Mumbai won by 4 wickets
Round 3	B9	3 December	Bengal	Tamil Nadu	KSCA Alur Cricket Ground, Bengaluru	Tamil Nadu won by 36 runs
Round 4	B10	5 December	Karnataka	Mumbai	KSCA Alur Cricket Ground, Bengaluru	Mumbai won by 7 wickets
Round 4	B11	5 December	Bengal	Delhi	KSCA Alur Cricket Ground-III, Bengaluru	Bengal won by 24 runs
Round 4	B12	5 December	Kerala	Tamil Nadu	M. Chinnaswamy Stadium, Bengaluru	Tamil Nadu won by 20 runs
Round 5	B13	6 December	Baroda	Mumbai	KSCA Alur Cricket Ground, Bengaluru	Mumbai won by 36 runs (VJD Method)
Round 5	B14	6 December	Bengal	Gujarat	KSCA Alur Cricket Ground-III, Bengaluru	Bengal won by 9 wickets
Round 5	B15	6 December	Kerala	Tripura	M. Chinnaswamy Stadium, Bengaluru	Tripura won by 9 runs
Round 6	B16	8 December	Delhi	Tripura	KSCA Alur Cricket Ground, Bengaluru	Delhi won by 4 wickets
Round 6	B17	8 December	Karnataka	Tamil Nadu	M. Chinnaswamy Stadium, Bengaluru	Karnataka won by 49 runs
Round 6	B18	8 December	Baroda	Gujarat	KSCA Alur Cricket Ground-II, Bengaluru	Baroda won by 10 wickets
Round 7	B19	10 December	Baroda	Bengal	KSCA Alur Cricket Ground-III, Bengaluru	Bengal won by 130 runs
Round 7	B20	10 December	Delhi	Karnataka	KSCA Alur Cricket Ground-II, Bengaluru	Delhi won by 28 runs
Round 7	B21	10 December	Kerala	Mumbai	KSCA Alur Cricket Ground, Bengaluru	Kerala won by 1 wicket
Round 8	B22	12 December	Delhi	Kerala	KSCA Alur Cricket Ground-III, Bengaluru	Kerala won by 3 wickets
Round 8	B23	12 December	Baroda	Tamil Nadu	KSCA Alur Cricket Ground, Bengaluru	Baroda won by 6 wickets
Round 8	B24	12 December	Gujarat	Tripura	KSCA Alur Cricket Ground-II, Bengaluru	Tripura won by 60 runs
Round 9	B25	14 December	Mumbai	Tamil Nadu	KSCA Alur Cricket Ground-II, Bengaluru	Mumbai won by 5 wickets
Round 9	B26	14 December	Bengal	Kerala	KSCA Alur Cricket Ground, Bengaluru	Bengal won by 74 runs
Round 9	B27	14 December	Karnataka	Tripura	M. Chinnaswamy Stadium, Bengaluru	Karnataka won by 57 runs
Round 10	B28	16 December	Baroda	Delhi	KSCA Alur Cricket Ground-II, Bengaluru	Baroda won by 22 runs
Round 10	B29	16 December	Gujarat	Tamil Nadu	KSCA Alur Cricket Ground-III, Bengaluru	Tamil Nadu won by 23 runs
Round 10	B30	16 December	Bengal	Mumbai	M. Chinnaswamy Stadium, Bengaluru	Mumbai won by 8 wickets
Round 11	B31	18 December	Tamil Nadu	Tripura	KSCA Alur Cricket Ground-II, Bengaluru	Tamil Nadu won by 6 wickets
Round 11	B32	18 December	Karnataka	Kerala	M. Chinnaswamy Stadium, Bengaluru	Karnataka won by 3 wickets
Round 11	B33	18 December	Delhi	Gujarat	KSCA Alur Cricket Ground-III, Bengaluru	Delhi won by 97 runs
Round 12	B34	20 December	Kerala	Kerala	M. Chinnaswamy Stadium, Bengaluru	Karnataka won by 3 wickets
Round 12	B35	20 December	Gujarat	Mumbai	KSCA Alur Cricket Ground-III, Bengaluru	Mumbai won by 125 runs
Round 12	B36	20 December	Bengal	Tripura	KSCA Alur Cricket Ground-II, Bengaluru	Bengal won by 8 wickets

==== Elite Group C ====
Round	No.	Date	Home team	Away team	Venue	Result
Round 1	C1	1 December	Himachal Pradesh	Jharkhand	Sunshine Ground, Cuttack	Himachal Pradesh won by 9 wickets
Round 1	C2	1 December	Assam	Madhya Pradesh	BOSE Ground, Cuttack	Madhya Pradesh won by 5 wickets
Round 1	C3	1 December	Hyderabad	Odisha	Nimpur Cricket Ground, Cuttack	Hyderabad won by 28 runs
Round 2	C4	2 December	Jammu and Kashmir	Jharkhand	Sunshine Ground, Cuttack	Jharkhand won by 132 runs
Round 2	C5	2 December	Assam	Uttar Pradesh	BOSE Ground, Cuttack	Uttar Pradesh won by 102 runs
Round 2	C6	2 December	Hyderabad	Rajasthan	Nimpur Cricket Ground, Cuttack	Hyderabad won by 78 runs
Round 3	C7	3 December	Jammu and Kashmir	Madhya Pradesh	Sunshine Ground, Cuttack	Madhya Pradesh won by 85 runs
Round 3	C8	3 December	Odisha	Uttar Pradesh	BOSE Ground, Cuttack	Odisha won by 6 wickets
Round 3	C9	3 December	Himachal Pradesh	Rajasthan	Nimpur Cricket Ground, Cuttack	Himachal Pradesh won by 4 wickets
Round 4	C10	5 December	Jharkhand	Odisha	Sunshine Ground, Cuttack	Jharkhand won by 7 wickets
Round 4	C11	5 December	Himachal Pradesh	Hyderabad	BOSE Ground, Cuttack	Himachal Pradesh won by 4 wickets
Round 4	C12	5 December	Madhya Pradesh	Rajasthan	Nimpur Cricket Ground, Cuttack	Madhya Pradesh won by 138 runs
Round 5	C13	6 December	Assam	Odisha	Sunshine Ground, Cuttack	Odisha won by 66 runs
Round 5	C14	6 December	Himachal Pradesh	Jammu and Kashmir	BOSE Ground, Cuttack	Himachal Pradesh won by 9 wickets
Round 5	C15	6 December	Madhya Pradesh	Uttar Pradesh	Nimpur Cricket Ground, Cuttack	Uttar Pradesh won by 7 runs
Round 6	C16	8 December	Hyderabad	Uttar Pradesh	Sunshine Ground, Cuttack	Hyderabad won by 53 runs
Round 6	C17	8 December	Jharkhand	Rajasthan	BOSE Ground, Cuttack	Jharkhand won by 81 runs
Round 6	C18	8 December	Assam	Jammu and Kashmir	Nimpur Cricket Ground, Cuttack	Assam won by 55 runs
Round 7	C19	10 December	Assam	Himachal Pradesh	Sunshine Ground, Cuttack	Himachal Pradesh won by 9 wickets
Round 7	C20	10 December	Hyderabad	Jharkhand	BOSE Ground, Cuttack	Hyderabad won by 24 runs
Round 7	C21	10 December	Madhya Pradesh	Odisha	Nimpur Cricket Ground, Cuttack	Odisha won by 8 runs
Round 8	C22	12 December	Hyderabad	Madhya Pradesh	Sunshine Ground, Cuttack	Madhya Pradesh won by 4 wickets
Round 8	C23	12 December	Assam	Rajasthan	BOSE Ground, Cuttack	Assam won by 2 wickets
Round 8	C24	12 December	Jammu and Kashmir	Uttar Pradesh	Nimpur Cricket Ground, Cuttack	Uttar Pradesh won by 8 wickets
Round 9	C25	14 December	Odisha	Rajasthan	Sunshine Ground, Cuttack	Odisha won by 3 wickets
Round 9	C26	14 December	Himachal Pradesh	Madhya Pradesh	BOSE Ground, Cuttack	Himachal Pradesh won by 40 runs
Round 9	C27	14 December	Jharkhand	Uttar Pradesh	Nimpur Cricket Ground, Cuttack	Uttar Pradesh won by 14 runs
Round 10	C28	16 December	Assam	Hyderabad	Sunshine Ground, Cuttack	Assam won by 15 runs
Round 10	C29	16 December	Jammu and Kashmir	Rajasthan	BOSE Ground, Cuttack	Rajasthan won by 27 runs
Round 10	C30	16 December	Himachal Pradesh	Odisha	Nimpur Cricket Ground, Cuttack	Himachal Pradesh won by 8 wickets
Round 11	C31	18 December	Rajasthan	Uttar Pradesh	Sunshine Ground, Cuttack	Uttar Pradesh won by 38 runs
Round 11	C32	18 December	Jharkhand	Madhya Pradesh	BOSE Ground, Cuttack	Match Abandoned
Round 11	C33	18 December	Hyderabad	Jammu and Kashmir	Nimpur Cricket Ground, Cuttack	Match Abandoned
Round 12	C34	20 December	Himachal Pradesh	Uttar Pradesh	Sunshine Ground, Cuttack	Himachal Pradesh won by 7 runs
Round 12	C35	20 December	Jammu and Kashmir	Odisha	BOSE Ground, Cuttack	Odisha won by 5 wickets
Round 12	C36	20 December	Assam	Jharkhand	Nimpur Cricket Ground, Cuttack	Jharkhand won by 58 runs

==== Plate Group ====
Round	No.	Date	Home team	Away team	Venue	Result
Round 1	P1	1 December	Arunachal Pradesh	Mizoram	Ravenshaw University Ground 1, Cuttack	Mizoram won by 196 runs
Round 1	P2	1 December	Bihar	Nagaland	Ravenshaw University Ground 2, Cuttack	Nagaland won by 124 runs
Round 1	P3	1 December	Manipur	Pondicherry	KIIT Stadium, Bhubaneswar	Pondicherry won by 7 wickets
Round 2	P4	2 December	Meghalaya	Mizoram	Ravenshaw University Ground 1, Cuttack	Meghalaya won by 10 wickets
Round 2	P5	2 December	Bihar	Uttarakhand	Ravenshaw University Ground 2, Cuttack	Uttarakhand won by 8 wickets
Round 2	P6	2 December	Manipur	Sikkim	KIIT Stadium, Bhubaneswar	Manipur won by 53 runs
Round 3	P7	3 December	Meghalaya	Nagaland	Ravenshaw University Ground 1, Cuttack	Meghalaya won by 23 runs
Round 3	P8	3 December	Pondicherry	Uttarakhand	Ravenshaw University Ground 2, Cuttack	Uttarakhand won by 16 runs
Round 3	P9	3 December	Arunachal Pradesh	Sikkim	KIIT Stadium, Bhubaneswar	Arunachal Pradesh won by 34 runs
Round 4	P10	5 December	Mizoram	Pondicherry	Ravenshaw University Ground 1, Cuttack	Pondicherry won by 232 runs
Round 4	P11	5 December	Arunachal Pradesh	Manipur	Ravenshaw University Ground 2, Cuttack	Manipur won by 154 runs
Round 4	P12	5 December	Nagaland	Sikkim	KIIT Stadium, Bhubaneswar	Nagaland won by 54 runs
Round 5	P13	6 December	Bihar	Pondicherry	Ravenshaw University Ground 1, Cuttack	Pondicherry won by 9 wickets
Round 5	P14	6 December	Arunachal Pradesh	Meghalaya	Ravenshaw University Ground 2, Cuttack	Meghalaya won by 209 runs
Round 5	P15	6 December	Nagaland	Uttarakhand	KIIT Stadium, Bhubaneswar	Uttarakhand won by 48 runs
Round 6	P16	8 December	Manipur	Uttarakhand	Ravenshaw University Ground 1, Cuttack	Uttarakhand won by 3 wickets
Round 6	P17	8 December	Mizoram	Sikkim	Ravenshaw University Ground 2, Cuttack	Sikkim won by 216 runs
Round 6	P18	8 December	Bihar	Meghalaya	KIIT Stadium, Bhubaneswar	Meghalaya won by 10 wickets
Round 7	P19	10 December	Arunachal Pradesh	Bihar	Ravenshaw University Ground 1, Cuttack	Bihar won by 172 runs
Round 7	P20	10 December	Manipur	Mizoram	Ravenshaw University Ground 2, Cuttack	Manipur won by 218 runs
Round 7	P21	10 December	Nagaland	Pondicherry	KIIT Stadium, Bhubaneswar	Pondicherry won by 8 wickets
Round 8	P22	12 December	Manipur	Nagaland	Ravenshaw University Ground 1, Cuttack	Nagaland won by 33 runs
Round 8	P23	12 December	Bihar	Sikkim	Ravenshaw University Ground 2, Cuttack	Sikkim won by 78 runs
Round 8	P24	12 December	Meghalaya	Uttarakhand	KIIT Stadium, Bhubaneswar	Meghalaya won by 10 wickets
Round 9	P25	14 December	Pondicherry	Sikkim	Ravenshaw University Ground 1, Cuttack	Pondicherry won by 6 wickets
Round 9	P26	14 December	Arunachal Pradesh	Nagaland	Ravenshaw University Ground 2, Cuttack	Nagaland won by 8 wickets
Round 9	P27	14 December	Mizoram	Uttarakhand	KIIT Stadium, Bhubaneswar	Uttarakhand won by 241 runs
Round 10	P28	16 December	Bihar	Manipur	Ravenshaw University Ground 1, Cuttack	Manipur won by 4 wickets
Round 10	P29	16 December	Meghalaya	Sikkim	Ravenshaw University Ground 2, Cuttack	Match Tied
Round 10	P30	16 December	Arunachal Pradesh	Pondicherry	KIIT Stadium, Bhubaneswar	Pondicherry won by 8 wickets
Round 11	P31	18 December	Sikkim	Uttarakhand	Ravenshaw University Ground 1, Cuttack	Uttarakhand won by 42 runs (VJD Method)
Round 11	P32	18 December	Mizoram	Nagaland	Ravenshaw University Ground 2, Cuttack	Nagaland won by 7 wickets
Round 11	P33	18 December	Manipur	Meghalaya	KIIT Stadium, Bhubaneswar	Match Abandoned
Round 12	P34	20 December	Arunachal Pradesh	Uttarakhand	Ravenshaw University Ground 1, Cuttack	Uttarakhand won by 225 runs
Round 12	P35	20 December	Meghalaya	Pondicherry	Ravenshaw University Ground 2, Cuttack	Pondicherry won by 5 wickets
Round 12	P36	20 December	Bihar	Mizoram	KIIT Stadium, Bhubaneswar	Bihar won by 8 wickets

== Knockout stage ==
Quarter-finals
AB1	Railways	64/0
P1	Uttarakhand	62
AB4	Bengal	174
AB5	Baroda	97/9
AB2	Andhra	161/7
C2	Odisha	160
AB3	Mumbai	138
C1	Himachal	140/4

Semi-finals
AB1	Railways	190
AB4	Bengal	211/7
AB2	Andhra	195/6
C1	Himachal	194/3

Final
AB4	Bengal	198/7
AB2	Andhra	187

=== Quarter-finals ===
1st Quarter-final
26 December 2018
Scorecard

Uttarakhand; 62 (37.5 overs)	v	Railways; 64/0 (8.2 overs)
Sunita Madhwal 14 (61); Poonam Yadav 5/8 (6 overs)		Mona Meshram 37* (31)

Railways won by 10 wickets
Just Cricket Ground, Bengaluru
Umpires: Prabhakar Rao Kurra (Ind) and Ghanasyam Prabhu (Ind)

- Uttarakhand won the toss and elected to bat.

2nd Quarter-final
26 December 2018
Scorecard

Odisha; 160 (50 overs)	v	Andhra; 161/7 (46.5 overs)
Sushree Dibyadarshini 46 (61); Chandra Lekha 2/16 (5 overs)		Challa Jhansi Lakshmi 75 (108); Priyanka Priyadarshini 2/17 (10 overs)

Andhra won by 3 wickets
M. Chinnaswamy Stadium, Bengaluru
Umpires: Ganesh Charhate (Ind) and Nikhil Menon (Ind)

- Odisha won the toss and elected to bat.

3rd Quarter-final
27 December 2018
Scorecard

Mumbai; 138 (36.4 overs)	v	Himachal Pradesh; 140/4 (42.4 overs)
Mudha Joshi 42 (55); Tanuja Kanwar 2/17 (7 overs)		Harleen Deol 74* (128); Jemimah Rodrigues 1/15 (2 overs)

Himachal Pradesh won by 6 wickets
KSCA Alur Cricket Ground-II, Bengaluru
Umpires: Nikhil Menon (Ind) and Ganesh Charhate (Ind)

- Mumbai won the toss and elected to bat.

4th Quarter-final
27 December 2018
Scorecard

Bengal; 174 (48.2 overs)	v	Baroda; 97/9 (50 overs)
Prativa Rana 37 (76); Tarannum Pathan 3/25 (9 overs)		Kesha Patel 19* (53); Tanusree Sarkar 3/19 (7 overs)

Bengal won by 77 runs
KSCA Alur Cricket Ground-III, Bengaluru
Umpires: Prabhakar Rao Kurra (Ind) and Ghanasyam Prabhu (Ind)

- Bengal won the toss and elected to bat.

=== Semi-finals ===
1st Semi-final
29 December 2018
Scorecard

Bengal; 211/7 (50 overs)	v	Railways; 190 (49 overs)
Deepti Sharma 85 (132); Ekta Bisht 2/34 (9 overs)		Nuzhat Parween 74 (124); Shubhlakshmi Sharma 5/48 (10 overs)

Bengal won by 21 runs
M. Chinnaswamy Stadium, Bengaluru
Umpires: Prabhakar Rao Kurra (Ind) and Nikhil Menon (Ind)

- Bengal won the toss and elected to bat.

2nd Semi-final
29 December 2018
Scorecard

Andhra; 194/3 (50 overs)	v	Himachal; 195/6 (48.3 overs)
Neena Chaudhary 79* (126); Challa Jhansi Lakshmi 1/29 (10 overs)		Chandra Lekha 49 (79); Renuka Singh 2/29 (10 overs)

Andhra won by 4 wickets
Just Cricket Ground, Bengaluru
Umpires: Saidharshan Kumar (Ind) and Ganesh Charhate (Ind)

- Andhra won the toss and elected to field.

=== Final ===
31 December 2018
Scorecard

Bengal; 198/7 (50 overs)	v	Andhra; 188 (49.1 overs)
Mandira Mahapatra 39* (53); Challa Jhansi Lakshmi 3/40 (10 overs)		Neeragattu Anusha 61 (107); Deepti Sharma 3/33 (8.1 overs)

Bengal won by 10 runs
Just Cricket Ground, Bengaluru
Umpires: Saidharshan Kumar (Ind) and P Jayapal (Ind)

- Andhra won the toss and elected to field.
- Bengal won their first Senior Women's One Day League title.

== Statistics ==
=== Most runs ===
Player	Team	Matches	Innings	Runs	Average	HS	100s	50s
Deepti Sharma	Bengal	11	11	487	69.57	106*	2	2
Saee Purandare	Meghalaya	7	7	462	154.00	153*	1	4
Jemimah Rodrigues	Mumbai	9	9	435	62.14	133*	2	1
Ananya Upendran	Sikkim	8	8	410	58.57	157*	1	1
Priya Punia	Delhi	8	8	407	50.87	143	2	0

Source: CricketArchive

=== Most wickets ===
Player	Team	Overs	Wickets	Average	BBI	5w
Tarannum Pathan	Baroda	86.5	24	9.70	5/26	1
Vandhnashree Mahajan	Meghayala	63.0	22	7.00	8/4	1
Deepti Sharma	Bengal	92.1	22	11.09	4/12	0
Poonam Yadav	Railways	73.0	21	8.66	6/8	2
Renuka Singh	Himachal Pradesh	85.4	21	11.19	5/17	1

Source: CricketArchive
