= 2026–27 Ranji Trophy =

Cricket tournament in India

- Dates: 11 October 2026 – 3 March 2027
- Administrator: BCCI
- Cricket format: First-class cricket
- Tournament format: Round-robin then knockout
- Host: India
- Participants: 38
- Matches: 135
- Official website: Ranji Trophy Elite; Ranji Trophy Plate

The 2026–27 Ranji Trophy is the 92nd season of the Ranji Trophy, the premier first-class cricket tournament in India. It is scheduled to take place from 11 October 2026 to 3 March 2027. This tournament is part of the 2026–27 Indian Domestic Cricket Season, announced by the BCCI in June 2026. Jammu and Kashmir are the defending champions.

== Teams ==
Group A	Group B	Group C	Group D	Plate Group
Bihar	Karnataka	Bengal	Mumbai	Mizoram
Baroda	Andhra	Delhi	Rajasthan	Manipur
Goa	Saurashtra	Gujarat	Haryana	Nagaland
Jammu & Kashmir	Chhattisgarh	Jharkhand	Tamil Nadu	Sikkim
Madhya Pradesh	Hyderabad	Kerala	Himachal Pradesh	Meghalaya
Pondicherry	Tripura	Maharashtra	Uttarakhand	Arunchal Pradesh
Uttar Pradesh	Punjab	Services	Railways	—N/a
Vidarbha	Assam	Odisha	Chandigarh	—N/a

Team changes from last season
▲ Promoted to Elite Groups	▼ Relegated to Plate Group
Bihar	Nagaland

== Standings ==
=== Group A ===
Pos	Team	Pld	W	L	T	D	NR	Pts	Quot
1	Vidarbha	3	3	0	0	0	0	19	1.820
2	Baroda	3	2	0	0	1	0	17	2.196
3	Uttar Pradesh	3	2	0	0	1	0	16	1.868
4	Madhya Pradesh	3	1	0	0	2	0	13	2.360
5	Jammu & Kashmir	3	0	1	0	2	0	2	0.678
6	Pondicherry	3	0	1	0	2	0	2	0.578
7	Goa	3	0	3	0	0	0	0	0.494
8	Bihar	3	0	3	0	0	0	0	0.315

Updated to match(es) played on 29 October 2026. Source: Cricinfo

=== Group B ===
Pos	Team	Pld	W	L	T	D	NR	Pts	Quot
1	Hyderabad	3	2	0	0	1	0	14	1.533
2	Saurashtra	3	1	0	0	2	0	13	1.672
3	Punjab	3	1	0	0	2	0	12	1.531
4	Karnataka	3	1	0	0	2	0	9	1.247
5	Assam	3	1	1	0	1	0	7	0.791
6	Chhattisgarh	3	1	1	0	1	0	7	0.662
7	Andhra	3	0	2	0	1	0	3	0.842
8	Tripura	3	0	3	0	0	0	0	0.431

Updated to match(es) played on 29 October 2026. Source: Cricinfo

=== Group C ===
Pos	Team	Pld	W	L	T	D	NR	Pts	Quot
1	Bengal	3	3	0	0	0	0	18	1.567
2	Maharashtra	3	1	0	0	2	0	12	1.308
3	Gujarat	3	1	0	0	2	0	9	1.142
4	Kerala	3	1	1	0	1	0	8	0.888
5	Jharkhand	3	0	0	0	3	0	5	0.564
6	Delhi	3	0	1	0	2	0	4	1.232
7	Services	3	0	2	0	1	0	1	0.822
8	Odisha	3	0	2	0	1	0	1	0.450

Updated to match(es) played on 29 October 2026. Source: Cricinfo

=== Group D ===
Pos	Team	Pld	W	L	T	D	NR	Pts	Quot
1	Mumbai	3	3	0	0	0	0	21	2.583
2	Tamil Nadu	3	2	0	0	1	0	14	1.396
3	Haryana	3	2	1	0	0	0	13	1.190
4	Rajasthan	3	0	0	0	3	0	9	1.154
5	Uttarakhand	3	0	1	0	2	0	4	0.649
6	Railways	3	0	1	0	2	0	2	0.816
7	Chandigarh	3	0	2	0	1	0	1	0.552
8	Himachal Pradesh	3	0	2	0	1	0	1	0.484

Updated to match(es) played on 29 October 2026. Source: Cricinfo

=== Plate Group ===
Pos	Team	Pld	W	L	T	D	NR	Pts	Quot
1	Manipur	3	2	1	0	0	0	12	1.132
2	Meghalaya	3	1	0	0	2	0	12	1.158
3	Sikkim	3	1	0	0	2	0	9	1.841
4	Mizoram	3	0	1	0	2	0	4	0.920
5	Nagaland	2	0	0	0	2	0	4	0.826
6	Arunchal Pradesh	2	0	2	0	0	0	0	0.369

Updated to match(es) played on 29 October 2026. Source: Cricinfo

== Fixtures ==
=== Elite Group A ===
==== Round 1 ====
11–13 October 2026
Scorecard

Uttar Pradesh; 540 (153.1 overs)	v	Bihar; 141 (52.1 overs) & 132 (36.4 overs) (f/o)

Uttar Pradesh won by an innings and 267 runs
Rajgir International Cricket Stadium, Bihar
Points: Uttar Pradesh 7, Bihar 0

11–14 October 2026
Scorecard

Baroda; 472/8d (157 overs)	v	Goa; 199 (71.1 overs) & 138 (68 overs) (f/o)

Baroda won by an innings and 135 runs
Panjim Gymkhana Grounds, Panaji
Points: Baroda 7, Goa 0

11–14 October 2026
Scorecard

Madhya Pradesh; 196 (74.2 overs) & 249/6d (80 overs)	v	Jammu & Kashmir; 120 (46.3 overs) & 88/7 (34 overs)

Match drawn
Sher-i-Kashmir Stadium, Srinagar
Points: Madhya Pradesh 3, Jammu & Kashmir 1

11–14 October 2026
Scorecard

Vidarbha; 428 (129.4 overs) & 175/3d (36 overs)	v	Pondicherry; 313 (114.5 overs) & 130 (41.1 overs)

Vidarbha won by 160 runs
Vidarbha Cricket Association Stadium, Nagpur
Points: Vidarbha 6, Pondicherry 0

==== Round 2 ====
18–20 October 2026
Scorecard

Bihar; 166 (53 overs) & 251 (76.2 overs)	v	Baroda; 416 (114.1 overs) & 4/0 (1.1 overs)

Baroda won by 10 wickets
Reliance Stadium, Vadodara
Points: Baroda 7, Bihar 0

18–21 October 2026
Scorecard

Pondicherry; 177 (65.2 overs) & 98/1 (38 overs)	v	Madhya Pradesh; 345 (111.2 overs)

Match drawn
Cricket Association Pondicherry Siechem Ground, Pondicherry
Points: Madhya Pradesh 3, Pondicherry 1

18–20 October 2026
Scorecard

Jammu & Kashmir; 260 (82.5 overs) & 123 (39.2 overs)	v	Vidarbha; 305 (73 overs) & 81/7 (22.5 overs)

Vidarbha won by 3 wickets
Sher-i-Kashmir Stadium, Srinagar
Points: Vidarbha 6, Jammu and Kashmir 0

18–20 October 2026
Scorecard

Uttar Pradesh; 202 (71 overs) & 197 (58.4 overs)	v	Goa; 164 (61.3 overs) & 167 (46 overs)

Uttar Pradesh won by 68 runs
Green Park Stadium, Kanpur
Points: Uttar Pradesh 6, Goa 0

==== Round 3 ====
26–29 October 2026
Scorecard

Baroda; 616 (169 overs)	v	Jammu & Kashmir; 303 (77.5 overs) & 316/6 (96 overs) (f/o)

Match drawn
Reliance Stadium, Vadodara
Points: Baroda 3, Jammu and Kashmir 1

26–29 October 2026
Scorecard

Bihar; 99 (30.3 overs) & 134 (34 overs)	v	Madhya Pradesh; 407/8d (92.2 overs)

Madhya Pradesh won by an innings and 174 runs
Holkar Cricket Stadium, Indore
Points: Madhya Pradesh 7, Bihar 0

26–29 October 2026
Scorecard

Goa; 220 (93.5 overs) & 195 (76 overs)	v	Vidarbha; 442/8d (134.2 overs)

Vidarbha won by an innings and 27 runs
Vidarbha Cricket Association Stadium, Jamtha, Nagpur
Points: Vidarbha 7, Goa 0

26–29 October 2026
Scorecard

Uttar Pradesh; 333 (124.5 overs)	v	Pondicherry; 172 (68.1 overs) & 211/8 (98 overs) (f/o)

Match drawn
Cricket Association Pondicherry Siechem Ground, Pondicherry
Points: Uttar Pradesh 3, Pondicherry 1

==== Round 4 ====
2–5 November 2026
Scorecard

Baroda; 355 (115.3 overs) & 169/6 (76 overs)	v	Uttar Pradesh; 492 (137.3 overs)

Match drawn
Green Park Stadium, Kanpur
Points: Uttar Pradesh 3, Baroda 1

2–4 November 2026
Scorecard

Goa; 397 (119.4 overs)	v	Bihar; 107 (26.1 overs) & 113 (45.3 overs) (f/o)

Goa won by an innings and 177 runs
Panjim Gymkhana Grounds, Panaji
Points: Goa 7, Bihar 0

2–4 November 2026
Scorecard

Vidarbha; 334 (103.3 overs)	v	Madhya Pradesh; 209 (66.1 overs) & 105 (33.3 overs)

Vidarbha won by an innings and 20 runs
Vidarbha Cricket Association Stadium, Jamtha, Nagpur
Points: Vidarbha 7, Madhya Pradesh 0

2–5 November 2026
Scorecard

Pondicherry; 385 (93.2 overs) & 269/6 (65 overs)	v	Jammu & Kashmir; 555/6d (135 overs)

Match drawn
Sher-i-Kashmir Stadium, Srinagar
Points: Jammu and Kashmir 3, Pondicherry 1

==== Round 5 ====
17–20 January 2027
Scorecard

Baroda	v	Vidarbha

Kotambi Stadium, Vadodara

17–20 January 2027
Scorecard

Bihar	v	Jammu & Kashmir

17–20 January 2027
Scorecard

Madhya Pradesh	v	Uttar Pradesh

17–20 January 2027
Scorecard

Goa	v	Pondicherry

Goa Cricket Association Academy Ground, Porvorim

==== Round 6 ====
24–27 January 2027
Scorecard

Pondicherry	v	Baroda

Cricket Association Pondicherry Siechem Ground, Pondicherry

4–27 January 2027
Scorecard

Bihar	v	Vidarbha

4–27 January 2027
Scorecard

Madhya Pradesh	v	Goa

4–27 January 2027
Scorecard

Uttar Pradesh	v	Jammu & Kashmir

==== Round 7 ====
1–4 February 2027
Scorecard

Baroda	v	Madhya Pradesh

Alembic Ground, Vadodara

1–4 February 2027
Scorecard

Pondicherry	v	Bihar

1–4 February 2027
Scorecard

Vidarbha	v	Uttar Pradesh

1–4 February 2027
Scorecard

Jammu & Kashmir	v	Goa

=== Elite Group B ===
==== Round 1 ====
11–14 October 2026
Scorecard

Tripura; 134 (44 overs) & 120 (41.2 overs)	v	Hyderabad; 294 (103.2 overs)

Hyderabad won by an innings and 40 runs
Gymkhana Ground, Secunderabad
Points: Hyderabad 7, Tripura 0

11–14 October 2026
Scorecard

Karnataka; 274 (82.2 overs) & 337/9d (103 overs)	v	Andhra; 418 (121.5 overs) & 104/4 (44 overs)

Match drawn
Dr. Gokaraju Liala Gangaaraju ACA Cricket Ground, Mulapadu
Points: Andhra 3, Karnataka 1

11–14 October 2026
Scorecard

Assam; 373 (117 overs) & 157/6 (61 overs)	v	Punjab; 478/6d (127 overs)

Match drawn
Maharaja Yadavindra Singh International Cricket Stadium, New Chandigarh
Points: Punjab 3, Assam 1

11–14 October 2026
Scorecard

Saurashtra; 392 (110.4 overs) & 229/1 (67 overs)	v	Chhattisgarh; 312 (121.5 overs)

Match drawn
Niranjan Shah Stadium, Rajkot
Points: Saurashtra 3, Chattisgarh 1

==== Round 2 ====
18–21 October 2026
Scorecard

Assam; 334 (111.1 overs) & 307 (67.4 overs) (f/o)	v	Tripura; 62 (22.1 overs) & 36/1 (13.2 overs)

Assam won by 9 wickets
Barsapara Cricket Stadium, Guwahati
Points: Assam 6, Tripura 0

18–21 October 2026
Scorecard

Hyderabad; 275 (86 overs) & 306/7d (95.3 overs)	v	Andhra; 184 (63 overs) & 130 (30.5 overs)

Hyderabad won by 267 runs
Devineni Venkata Ramana Praneetha Ground, Mulapadu
Points: Hyderabad 6, Andhra 0

18–21 October 2026
Scorecard

Karnataka; 342 (111.3 overs) & 243/7d (64.1 overs)	v	Saurashtra; 349 (108.3 overs) & 137/2 (42 overs)

Match drawn
KSCA Cricket Ground, Alur
Points: Saurashtra 3, Karnataka 1

18–21 October 2026
Scorecard

Punjab; 456 (152.5 overs) & 86/3 (16.5 overs)	v	Chhattisgarh; 206 (64.5 overs) & 335 (116.2 overs) (f/o)

Punjab won by 7 wickets
Maharaja Yadavindra Singh International Cricket Stadium, New Chandigarh
Points: Punjab 6, Chhattisgarh 0

==== Round 3 ====
26–29 October 2026
Scorecard

Punjab; 431 (124.5 overs) & 240/6d (78 overs)	v	Hyderabad; 380 (119.5 overs)

Match drawn
Gymkhana Ground, Secunderabad
Points: Punjab 3, Hyderabad 1

26–29 October 2026
Scorecard

Tripura; 194 (82 overs) & 180 (78.1 overs)	v	Karnataka; 490/9d (144 overs)

Karnataka won by an innings and 116 runs
Srikantadatta Narasimha Raja Wadeyar Ground, Mysore
Points: Karnataka 7, Tripura 0

26–29 October 2026
Scorecard

Assam; 281 (112.3 overs) & 94 (44 overs)	v	Saurashtra; 387 (131.4 overs)

Saurashtra won by an innings and 12 runs
Niranjan Shah Stadium, Rajkot
Points: Saurashtra 7, Assam 0

26–29 October 2026
Scorecard

Andhra; 231 (73.2 overs) & 184/3d (32 overs)	v	Chhattisgarh; 237 (107.3 overs) & 182/5 (35.1 overs)

Chhattisgarh won by 5 wickets
Devineni Venkata Ramana Praneetha Ground, Mulapadu
Points: Chhattisgarh 6, Andhra 0

==== Round 4 ====
2–4 November 2026
Scorecard

Assam; 135 (48.1 overs) & 128 (40.2 overs)	v	Karnataka; 577/6d (133.2 overs)

Karnataka won by an innings and 314 runs
Barsapara Cricket Stadium, Guwahati
Points: Karnataka 7, Assam 0

2–5 November 2026
Scorecard

Tripura; 268 (92 overs) & 191 (64.4 overs)	v	Saurashtra; 118 (45.5 overs) & 208 (77.3 overs)

Tripura won by 133 runs
Maharaja Bir Bikram College Stadium, Agartala
Points: Tripura 6, Saurashtra 0

2–5 November 2026
Scorecard

Chhattisgarh	v	Hyderabad

2–5 November 2026
Scorecard

Punjab; 592/9d (156 overs) & 505/8 (178 overs)	v	Andhra

Match drawn
Maharaja Yadavindra Singh International Cricket Stadium, New Chandigarh
Points: Punjab 1, Andhra 1

==== Round 5 ====
17–20 January 2027
Scorecard

Assam	v	Hyderabad

17–20 January 2027
Scorecard

Karnataka	v	Chhattisgarh

17–20 January 2027
Scorecard

Tripura	v	Punjab

17–20 January 2027
Scorecard

Andhra	v	Saurashtra

==== Round 6 ====
24–27 January 2027
Scorecard

Hyderabad	v	Karnataka

24–27 January 2027
Scorecard

Punjab	v	Saurashtra

24–27 January 2027
Scorecard

Assam	v	Chhattisgarh

24–27 January 2027
Scorecard

Tripura	v	Andhra

==== Round 7 ====
1–4 February 2027
Scorecard

Saurashtra	v	Hyderabad

1–4 February 2027
Scorecard

Karnataka	v	Punjab

1–4 February 2027
Scorecard

Andhra	v	Assam

1–4 February 2027
Scorecard

Chhattisgarh	v	Tripura

=== Elite Group C ===
==== Round 1 ====
11–14 October 2026
scorecard

Jharkhand; 587 (179.5 overs) & 60/2 (19.3 overs)	v	Kerala; 395 (127.5 overs)

Match drawn
Keenan Stadium, Jamshedpur
Points: Jharkhand 3, Kerala 1

11–14 October 2026
scorecard

Delhi; 240 (77.3 overs) & 277 (106.2 overs)	v	Bengal; 429 (112 overs) & 89/1 (15.3 overs)

Bengal won by 9 wickets
Bengal Cricket Academy Ground, Kalyani
Points: Bengal 6, Delhi 0

11–14 October 2026
scorecard

Odisha; 324 (113 overs) & 161 (46.1 overs)	v	Gujarat; 429 (106.4 overs) & 47/0 (9.3 overs)

Gujarat won by 10 wickets
Narendra Modi Stadium B Ground, Motera, Ahmedabad
Points: Gujarat 7, Odisha 0

11–14 October 2026
scorecard

Maharashtra; 333 (110.1 overs) & 141 (56 overs)	v	Services; 227 (93.2 overs) & 120 (63.3 overs)

Maharashtra won by 127 runs
Palam A Ground, Model Sports Complex, Delhi
Points: Maharashtra 6, Services 0

==== Round 2 ====
18–21 October 2026
Scorecard

Jharkhand; 169 (58.2 overs) & 344/8 (136 overs)	v	Maharashtra; 527/5d (150 overs)

Match drawn
Maharashtra Cricket Association Stadium, Pune
Points: Maharashtra 3, Jharkhand 1

18–21 October 2026
Scorecard

Delhi; 648/6d (136.4 overs)	v	Gujarat; 479 (174.1 overs) & 15/1 (8 overs) (f/o)

Match drawn
Palam B Ground, Model Sports Complex, Delhi
Points: Delhi 3, Gujarat 1

18–21 October 2026
Scorecard

Bengal; 184 (54 overs) & 146 (52.5 overs)	v	Services; 122 (62.2 overs) & 148 (68.5 overs)

Bengal won by 60 runs
Palam A Ground, Model Sports Complex, Delhi
Points: Bengal 6, Services 0

18–21 October 2026
Scorecard

Kerala; 404 (129.3 overs)	v	Odisha; 225 (84.1 overs) & 143 (58.3 overs) (f/o)

Kerala won by an innings and 36 runs
Greenfield International Stadium, Thiruvananthapuram
Points: Kerala 7, Odisha 0

==== Round 3 ====
26–29 October 2026
Scorecard

Delhi; 515/5d (130 overs)	v	Jharkhand; 131/4 (47 overs)

Match drawn
JSCA International Stadium Complex, Ranchi
Points: Delhi 1, Jharkhand 1

26–29 October 2026
Scorecard

Odisha; 194 (82.3 overs)	v	Services; 40/0 (12 overs)

Match drawn
KIIT Stadium, Bhubaneswar
Points: Odisha 1, Services 1

26–29 October 2026
Scorecard

Gujarat; 223 (75.5 overs) & 446/5d (101.1 overs)	v	Maharashtra; 330 (120.3 overs) & 141/4 (47 overs)

Match drawn
Maharashtra Cricket Association Stadium, Pune
Points: Maharashtra 3, Gujarat 1

26–29 October 2026
Scorecard

Bengal; 350 (102.2 overs) & 198 (46 overs)	v	Kerala; 141 (51.3 overs) & 120 (38.4 overs)

Bengal won by 287 runs
KCA Cricket Ground, Mangalapuram
Points: Bengal 6, Kerala 0

==== Round 4 ====
2–5 November 2026
Scorecard

Odisha	v	Jharkhand

2–5 November 2026
Scorecard

Bengal; 143(36.5 overs) & 186(54.4 overs)	v	Maharashtra; 218(82.5 overs) & 114/0(19.4 overs)

Maharashtra won by 10 wickets
Eden Gardens, Kolkata
Points: Maharashtra 7, Bengal 0

2–5 November 2026
Scorecard

Gujarat	v	Kerala

2–5 November 2026
Scorecard

Delhi	v	Services

==== Round 5 ====
17–20 January 2027
Scorecard

Jharkhand	v	Services

17–20 January 2027
Scorecard

Gujarat	v	Bengal

17–20 January 2027
Scorecard

Odisha	v	Delhi

17–20 January 2027
Scorecard

Maharashtra	v	Kerala

==== Round 6 ====
24–27 January 2027
Scorecard

Jharkhand	v	Bengal

24–27 January 2027
Scorecard

Services	v	Gujarat

24–27 January 2027
Scorecard

Kerala	v	Delhi

24–27 January 2027
Scorecard

Maharashtra	v	Odisha

==== Round 7 ====
1–4 February 2027
Scorecard

Gujarat	v	Jharkhand

1–4 February 2027
Scorecard

Delhi	v	Maharashtra

1–4 February 2027
Scorecard

Bengal	v	Odisha

1–4 February 2027
Scorecard

Kerala	v	Services

=== Elite Group D ===
==== Round 1 ====
11–14 October 2026
scorecard

Himachal Pradesh; 253 (113.4 overs) & 113 (40 overs)	v	Haryana; 296 (82.3 overs) & 74/3 (18.1 overs)

Haryana won by 7 wickets
Chaudhary Bansi Lal Cricket Stadium, Lahli, Rohtak
Points: Haryana 6, Himachal Pradesh 0

11–14 October 2026
scorecard

Railways; 278 (87.5 overs) & 272 (86 overs)	v	Uttarakhand; 470 (156.5 overs)

Match drawn
Brabourne Stadium, Mumbai
Points: Uttarakhand 3, Railways 1

11–14 October 2026
scorecard

Rajasthan; 363 (115.3 overs) & 192/6d (70.1 overs)	v	Tamil Nadu; 274 (98.4 overs) & 73/0 (23 overs)

Match drawn
Sawai Mansingh Stadium, Jaipur
Points: Rajasthan 3, Tamil Nadu 1

11–13 October 2026
scorecard

Mumbai; 429 (136.5 overs)	v	Chandigarh; 78 (19.1 overs) & 196 (52.1 overs) (f/o)

Mumbai won by an innings and 155 runs
Wankhede Stadium, Mumbai
Points: Mumbai 7, Chandigarh 0

==== Round 2 ====
18–21 October 2026
Scorecard

Chandigarh; 103 (41.3 overs) & 118 (47 overs)	v	Haryana; 245 (77.1 overs)

Haryana won by an innings and 24 runs
Chaudhary Bansi Lal Cricket Stadium, Lahli, Rohtak
Points: Haryana 7, Chandigarh 0

18–21 October 2026
Scorecard

Himachal Pradesh; 140 (39.5 overs) & 291 (99.1 overs)	v	Mumbai; 528/8d (151 overs)

Mumbai won by an innings and 97 runs
Luhnu Cricket Ground, Bilaspur
Points: Mumbai 7, Himachal Pradesh 0

18–21 October 2026
Scorecard

Uttarakhand; 134 (56.2 overs) & 113 (45.4 overs)	v	Tamil Nadu; 313 (109 overs)

Tamil Nadu won by an innings and 66 runs
MA Chidambaram Stadium, Chepauk, Chennai
Points: Tamil Nadu 7, Uttarakhand 0

18–21 October 2026
Scorecard

Rajasthan; 497 (136 overs)	v	Railways; 338 (127 overs) & 176/2 (46 overs) (f/o)

Match drawn
Sawai Mansingh Stadium, Jaipur
Points: Rajasthan 3, Railways 1

==== Round 3 ====
26–29 October 2026
Scorecard

Mumbai; 430 (130.3 overs) & 97/0 (10.4 overs)	v	Haryana; 270 (107.5 overs) & 256 (85.3 overs) (f/o)

Mumbai won by 10 wickets
Sharad Pawar Cricket Academy BKC, Mumbai
Points: Mumbai 7, Haryana 0

26–29 October 2026
Scorecard

Rajasthan; 272 (81.2 overs) & 290/5d (101.4 overs)	v	Uttarakhand; 194 (72 overs) & 38/0 (9 overs)

Match drawn
Abhimanyu Cricket Academy, Dehradun
Points: Rajasthan 3, Uttarakhand 1

26–29 October 2026
Scorecard

Railways; 184 (53.3 overs) & 165 (52.3 overs)	v	Tamil Nadu; 108 (63.1 overs) & 130/5 (59.1 overs)

Tamil Nadu won by 5 wickets
MA Chidambaram Stadium, Chepauk, Chennai
Points: Tamil Nadu 6, Railways 0

26–29 October 2026
Scorecard

Chandigarh; 685/5d (161 overs)	v	Himachal Pradesh; 559/6 (177 overs)

Sector 16 Stadium, Chandigarh
Points: Chandigarh 1, Himachal Pradesh 1

==== Round 4 ====
2–4 November 2026
Scorecard

Uttarakhand; 153 (59.5 overs) & 159 (55.5 overs)	v	Haryana; 305 (125.4 overs) & 9/0 (1.2 overs)

Uttarakhand won by 10 wickets
Abhimanyu Cricket Academy, Dehradun
Points: Uttarakhand 7, Haryana 0

2–5 November 2026
Scorecard

Himachal Pradesh	v	Rajasthan

2–5 November 2026
Scorecard

Railways	v	Mumbai

2–5 November 2026
Scorecard

Chandigarh; 94 (37.3 overs) & 218 (64.5 overs)	v	Tamil Nadu; 571/7d (154 overs)

Tamil Nadu won by an innings and 259 runs
Sector 16 Stadium, Chandigarh
Points: Chandigarh 0, Tamil Nadu 7

==== Round 5 ====
17–20 January 2027
Scorecard

Railways	v	Haryana

17–20 January 2027
Scorecard

Mumbai	v	Uttarakhand

17–20 January 2027
Scorecard

Rajasthan	v	Chandigarh

17–20 January 2027
Scorecard

Tamil Nadu	v	Himachal Pradesh

==== Round 6 ====
24–27 January 2027
Scorecard

Rajasthan	v	Haryana

24–27 January 2027
Scorecard

Himachal Pradesh	v	Uttarakhand

24–27 January 2027
Scorecard

Chandigarh	v	Railways

24–27 January 2027
Scorecard

Tamil Nadu	v	Mumbai

==== Round 7 ====
1–4 February 2026
Scorecard

Haryana	v	Tamil Nadu

1–4 February 2026
Scorecard

Uttarakhand	v	Chandigarh

1–4 February 2026
Scorecard

Mumbai	v	Rajasthan

1–4 February 2026
Scorecard

Himachal Pradesh	v	Railways

=== Plate Group ===
==== Round 1 ====
11–14 October 2026
scorecard

Sikkim; 245 (80.5 overs) & 291/7 (96.1 overs)	v	Meghalaya; 395 (150.2 overs)

Match drawn
SICA Ground, Rangpo
Points: Meghalaya 3, Sikkim 1

11–14 October 2026
scorecard

Mizoram; 183 (62.3 overs) & 295 (107.4 overs)	v	Manipur; 251 (91 overs) & 228/7 (71.2 overs)

Manipur won by 3 wickets
Gokulbhai Somabhai Patel Stadium, Nadiad
Points: Manipur 6, Mizoram 0

11–14 October 2026
scorecard

Arunchal Pradesh	v	Nagaland

==== Round 2 ====
18–21 October 2026
scorecard

Meghalaya; 380 (101 overs) & 172 (51.5 overs)	v	Manipur; 277 (92 overs) & 272 (75.2 overs)

Meghalaya won by 3 runs
Meghalaya Cricket Association Cricket Ground, Polo Ground, Shillong
Points: Meghalaya 6, Manipur 0

18–21 October 2026
scorecard

Mizoram; 581/9d (154.1 overs)	v	Nagaland; 516 (181 overs)

Match drawn
Nagaland Cricket Stadium, Sovima
Points: Mizoram 3, Nagaland 1

18–20 October 2026
scorecard

Arunchal Pradesh; 121 (51.4 overs) & 123 (54 overs)	v	Sikkim; 572/5d (142 overs)

Sikkim won by an innings and 328 runs
Gokulbhai Somabhai Patel Stadium, Nadiad
Points: Sikkim 7, Arunachal Pradesh 0

==== Round 3 ====
26–29 October 2026
scorecard

Nagaland; 187 (72.5 overs) & 208 (91 overs)	v	Sikkim; 184 (71 overs) & 117/5 (46 overs)

Match drawn
SICA Ground, Rangpo
Points: Nagaland 3, Sikkim 1

26–29 October 2026
scorecard

Arunchal Pradesh; 111 (41.4 overs) & 431 (120.4 overs)	v	Manipur; 364 (101.2 overs) & 180/6 (48.4 overs)

Manipur won by 4 wickets
Narendra Modi Stadium B Ground, Motera, Ahmedabad
Points: Manipur 6, Arunachal Pradesh 0

26–29 October 2026
scorecard

Mizoram; 562 (137.2 overs) & 60/2d (22 overs)	v	Meghalaya; 430 (168.2 overs)

Match drawn
Gokulbhai Somabhai Patel Stadium, Nadiad
Points: Mizoram 3, Meghalaya 1

==== Round 4 ====
2–5 November 2026
scorecard

Manipur	v	Sikkim

2–5 November 2026
scorecard

Meghalaya	v	Nagaland

2–5 November 2026
scorecard

Mizoram	v	Arunchal Pradesh

==== Round 5 ====
17–20 January 2027
scorecard

Nagaland	v	Manipur

–17–20 January 2027
scorecard

Meghalaya	v	Arunchal Pradesh

17–20 January 2027
scorecard

Sikkim	v	Mizoram

==== Plate final ====
24–28 January 2027
Scorecard

TBD	v	TBD

TBA
