= Mahek =

Mahek, Mehak, or Mahak is a feminine given name of Sanskrit origin. It means "fragrance," "scent," or "sweet odor" in Sanskrit. Notable people with the name include:

== People ==
=== Mahak ===
- Mahak Jain (born 2001), Indian tennis player

=== Mahek ===
- Mahek Bukhari (born 1999), British-Pakistani social media influencer and convicted murderer
- Mahek Chahal (born 1979), Norwegian actress and model

=== Mehak ===
- Mehak Ali (born 1992), Pakistani singer
- Mehak Gul (born 2000), Pakistani chess player
- Mehak Kesar (born 1992), Indian cricketer
- Mehak Malik (born 1995), Pakistani dancer, TikToker, and stage actor
- Mehak Manwani (born 1996), Indian television and film actress
