= 2014–15 Senior Women's One Day League =

- Dates: 6 December 2014 – 5 January 2015
- Administrator: BCCI
- Cricket format: List A
- Tournament format: Round-robin
- Champions: Railways (8th title)
- Runners-up: Odisha
- Participants: 26
- Matches: 66
- Most runs: Mithali Raj (413)
- Most wickets: Challa Jhansi Lakshmi (17)

The 2014–15 Senior Women's One Day League was the 9th edition of the women's List A cricket competition in India. It took place from 6 December 2014 to 5 January 2015, with 26 teams divided into an Elite Group and a Plate Group. Railways won the tournament, their third in a row and eighth overall, by topping the Elite Group Super League.

== Competition format ==
The 26 teams competing in the tournament were divided into the Elite Group and the Plate Group, with the 10 teams in the Elite Group further divided into Groups A and B and the 16 teams in the Plate Group into Groups A, B and C. The tournament operated on a round-robin format, with each team playing every other team in their group once. The top two sides from each Elite Group progressed to the Elite Group Super League, which was a further round-robin group, with the winner of the group being crowned Champions. The bottom side from each Elite Group was relegated to the Plate Group for the following season. Meanwhile, the top two from each Plate Group progressed to a knockout stage, with the two teams that reached the final being promoted for the following season, as well as playing off for the Plate Group title. Matches were played using a 50 over format.

The groups worked on a points system with positions within the groups based on the total points of each team. Points were awarded as follows:

Win: 4 points.
Tie: 2 points.
Loss: 0 points.
No Result/Abandoned: 2 points.

If points in the final table are equal, teams are separated by most wins, then head-to-head record, then Net Run Rate.

== Elite Group ==
=== Elite Group A ===
Team	P	W	L	T	NR	Pts	NRR
Railways (Q)	4	3	1	0	0	12	+1.284
Delhi (Q)	4	3	1	0	0	12	+0.886
Bengal	4	2	2	0	0	8	+0.444
Hyderabad	4	1	3	0	0	4	–1.173
Uttar Pradesh (R)	4	1	3	0	0	4	–1.415

=== Elite Group B ===
Team	P	W	L	T	NR	Pts	NRR
Odisha (Q)	4	3	1	0	0	12	+1.451
Maharashtra (Q)	4	3	1	0	0	12	+0.529
Punjab	4	2	2	0	0	8	–0.267
Mumbai	4	2	2	0	0	8	–0.590
Tripura (R)	4	0	4	0	0	0	–1.061

=== Elite Group Super League ===
Team	P	W	L	T	NR	Pts	NRR
Railways (C)	3	3	0	0	0	12	+1.433
Odisha	3	2	1	0	0	8	–0.656
Delhi	3	1	2	0	0	4	–0.317
Maharashtra	3	0	3	0	0	0	–0.360

== Plate Group ==
=== Plate Group A ===
Team	P	W	L	T	NR	Pts	NRR
Goa (Q)	5	4	1	0	0	16	+1.369
Tamil Nadu (Q)	5	3	1	0	1	14	+0.901
Kerala	5	3	2	0	0	12	+0.670
Rajasthan	5	2	2	0	1	10	–0.381
Gujarat	5	1	3	0	1	6	–1.271
Jammu and Kashmir	5	0	4	0	1	2	–1.500

=== Plate Group B ===
Team	P	W	L	T	NR	Pts	NRR
Andhra (Q)	4	4	0	0	0	16	+0.732
Karnataka (Q)	4	3	1	0	0	12	+0.537
Assam	4	2	2	0	0	8	–0.062
Baroda	4	1	3	0	0	4	–0.696
Haryana	4	0	4	0	0	0	–0.495

=== Plate Group C ===
Team	P	W	L	T	NR	Pts	NRR
Madhya Pradesh (Q)	4	3	1	0	0	12	+0.820
Himachal Pradesh (Q)	4	3	1	0	0	12	+0.595
Vidarbha	4	3	1	0	0	12	+0.118
Jharkhand	4	1	3	0	0	4	–0.005
Saurashtra	4	0	4	0	0	0	–1.497

Advanced to Plate Group Semi-finals Advanced to Plate Group Quarter-finals

Source:CricketArchive

=== Knockout stage ===
Quarter-finals
C2	Himachal Pradesh	120
B2	Karnataka	124/3
A2	Tamil Nadu	87
C1	Madhya Pradesh	88/2

Semi-finals
B2	Karnataka	92
A1	Goa	93/3
C1	Madhya Pradesh	120
B1	Andhra	121/8

Final
B1	Andhra	189/9
A1	Goa	137/8

==== Quarter-finals ====
1 January 2015
Scorecard

Himachal Pradesh; 120 (34 overs)	v	Karnataka; 124/3 (33.2 overs)
Sushma Verma 49 (61); Sahana Pawar 3/30 (6 overs)		Vellaswamy Vanitha 49* (79); Anisha Ansari 1/16 (7 overs)

Karnataka won by 7 wickets
Electronic Corporation of India Limited Ground, Hyderabad
Umpires: Marcus Couto and Saurabh Dhote

- Karnataka won the toss and elected to field.

1 January 2015
Scorecard

Tamil Nadu; 87 (42.4 overs)	v	Madhya Pradesh; 88/2 (34 overs)
Venkatasubramani Swetha 21 (40); Pallavi Bharadwaj 4/18 (10 overs)		Nuzhat Parween 34* (73); Velayudhan Vilasini 1/13 (6 overs)

Madhya Pradesh won by 8 wickets
Rajiv Gandhi International Cricket Stadium, Hyderabad
Umpires: Kusha Kassibatta and Rajeev Kumar

- Madhya Pradesh won the toss and elected to field.

==== Semi-finals ====
3 January 2015
Scorecard

Madhya Pradesh; 120 (41.3 overs)	v	Andhra; 121/8 (44.2 overs)
Ritika Bhopalkar 36 (50); Rama Devi 5/18 (7.3 overs)		Sneha Deepthi 45* (80); Varsha Choudhary 4/12 (9 overs)

Andhra won by 2 wickets
Gymkhana Ground, Secunderabad
Umpires: Saurabh Dhote and Kusha Kassibatta

- Andhra won the toss and elected to field.

3 January 2015
Scorecard

Karnataka; 92 (44.2 overs)	v	Goa; 93/3 (39.1 overs)
Pushpa Kiresur 34 (74); Rupali Chavan 3/18 (9 overs)		Shikha Pandey 31* (49); Rajeshwari Gayakwad 1/9 (10 overs)

Goa won by 7 wickets
Rajiv Gandhi International Cricket Stadium, Hyderabad
Umpires: Marcus Couto and Rajeev Kumar

- Goa won the toss and elected to field.

==== Final ====
5 January 2015
Scorecard

Andhra; 189/9 (50 overs)	v	Goa; 137/8 (50 overs)
Sabbhineni Meghana 59 (76); Shikha Pandey 3/34 (9 overs)		Salma Divkar 43* (80); Monika Sai 2/25 (10 overs)

Andhra won by 52 runs
Rajiv Gandhi International Cricket Stadium, Hyderabad
Umpires: Marcus Couto and Kusha Kassibatta

- Goa won the toss and elected to field.
- Andhra and Goa are promoted to the Elite Group.

== Statistics ==
=== Most runs ===
Player	Team	Matches	Innings	Runs	Average	HS	100s	50s
Mithali Raj	Railways	7	7	413	82.60	116*	1	2
Punam Raut	Railways	7	7	357	89.25	100*	1	3
Anuja Patil	Maharashtra	7	7	270	67.50	76*	0	3
Thirush Kamini	Tamil Nadu	5	5	250	50.00	111	1	1
Madhuri Mehta	Odisha	7	7	223	37.16	64	0	3

Source: CricketArchive

=== Most wickets ===
Player	Team	Overs	Wickets	Average	BBI	5w
Challa Jhansi Lakshmi	Andhra	41.2	17	9.35	5/21	1
Shikha Pandey	Goa	46.0	15	7.66	4/10	0
Devika Vaidya	Maharashtra	66.2	14	16.21	3/22	0
Rameshwari Gayakwad	Karnataka	49.1	13	9.92	4/19	0
Gouher Sultana	Railways	67.1	12	12.33	4/20	0

Source: CricketArchive
