= Swagatika Rath =

Indian cricketer (born 1994)

Personal information
- Full name: Swagatika Rath
- Born: 2 November 1994 (age 32); Jajpur district, Odisha, India
- Batting: Right-handed
- Bowling: Right-arm offbreak
- Role: Bowler

International information
- National side: India
- ODI debut (cap 105): 8 April 2013 v Bangladesh
- Last ODI: 12 April 2013 v Bangladesh
- T20I debut (cap 39): 4 April 2013 v Bangladesh
- Last T20I: 5 April 2013 v Bangladesh

Domestic team information
- Years: Team
- 2010/11–2015/16: Odisha Women
- 2011/12–2015/16: East Zone Women
- 2016/17–2022/23: Railways Women
- 2022/23: Central Zone Women

Career statistics
Competition	WODI	WT20I
Matches	3	2
Runs scored	58	14
Batting average	29.00	7.00
100s/50s	0/0	0/0
Top score	30	9
Balls bowled	120	18
Wickets	3	0
Bowling average	24.33	–
5 wickets in innings	–	–
10 wickets in match	–	–
Best bowling	2/15	–
Catches/stumpings	1/–	–/–
- Source: Cricinfo, 8 January 2020

Swagatika Rath (born 2 November 1994) is an Indian former cricketer. She plays for Odisha and Railways in domestic matches. She made her Women's One Day International (WODI) and Women's Twenty20 International (WT20I) debut against Bangladesh in 2013. Rath played all of her international cricket matches for India in April 2013, representing her country in 3 ODIs and 2 WT20Is.

She announced her retirement from all formats of the game on 1 May 2023.

== Early life ==
Rath was born in Jajpur district to Bijaya Kumar Rath and Kunjalata Rath who were from Jasotikiri, Bhadrak district, Odisha.
