= Rasanara Parwin =

Indian cricketer (born 1992)

Personal information
- Full name: Rasanara Parwin
- Born: 4 May 1992 (age 34); Balangir, Odisha, India
- Batting: Right-handed
- Bowling: Right-arm off-break

International information
- National side: India
- Only ODI (cap 103): 31 January 2013 v West Indies
- T20I debut (cap 36): 1 October 2012 v Pakistan
- Last T20I: 3 October 2012 v Pakistan

Domestic team information
- Years: Team
- 2010/11–present: Odisha
- 2012/13: East Zone

Career statistics
Competition	WODI	WT20I
Matches	1	2
Runs scored	–	–
Batting average	–	–
100s/50s	–	–
Top score	–	–
Balls bowled	42	48
Wickets	–	4
Bowling average	–	9.50
5 wickets in innings	0	0
10 wickets in match	0	0
Best bowling	–	2/15
Catches/stumpings	0/–	0/–
- Source: Cricinfo, 23 June 2009

Rasanara Parwin (born 4 May 1992) is an Indian cricketer who plays as a right-arm off break bowler for Odisha. She made her international debut for the India national women's cricket team in the 2013 Women's Cricket World Cup against the West Indies.
