= Mehak Kesar =

Indian cricketer (born 1992)

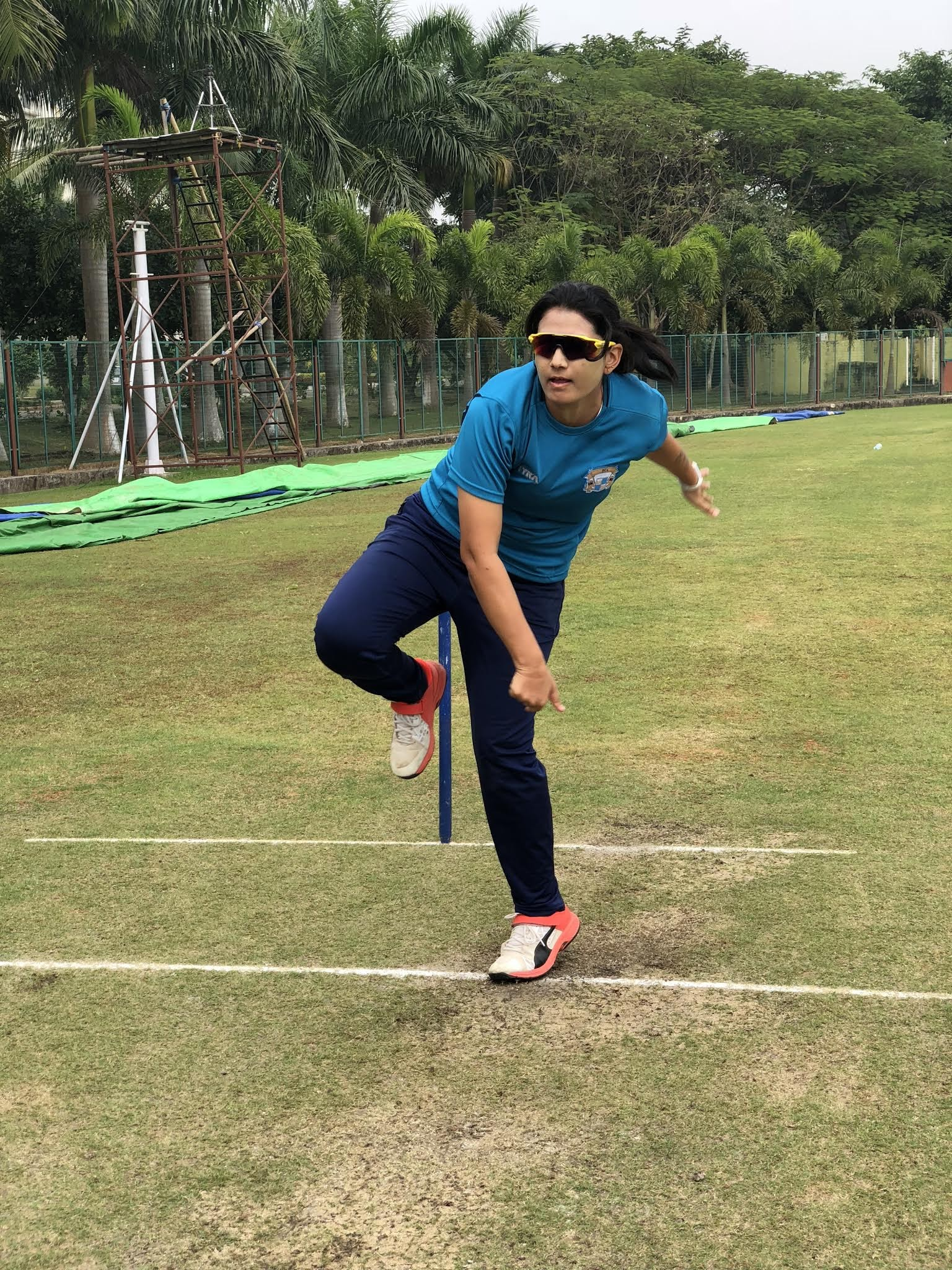

Personal information
- Full name: Mehak Kesar
- Born: 15 December 1992 (age 33); Sonipat, Haryana
- Batting: Right-handed
- Bowling: Right arm off-break
- Role: Bowler

Domestic team information
- Years: Team
- 2010 - present: Punjab

Career statistics
Competition	WFC	WLA	WT20
Matches	9	58	54
Runs scored	63	146	65
Batting average	4.84	6.34	4.06
100s/50s	0	0	0
Top score	21	24	8*
Balls bowled	783	2759	1026
Wickets	8	82	45
Bowling average	39.12	19.40	17.53
5 wickets in innings	0	0	0
10 wickets in match	0	0	0
Best bowling	2/30	4/6	3/8
Catches/stumpings	2/-	13/-	6/-
- Source: CricketArchive, 19 January 2022

Mehak Kesar (born 15 December 1992) is an Indian cricketer who plays for the Punjab women's cricket team. She is a right-arm off break bowler and a right-handed lower order batter. In 2019, she was the vice captain of the Punjab team when they won their maiden T20 title of the 2018–19 Senior Women's T20 League. In 2021, she was selected to represent India-A ahead of the 2021–22 Senior Women's Challenger Trophy organized by Board of Control for Cricket in India.

== Early life ==
Kesar was born on 15 December 1992 in Sonipat, Haryana. She represented Haryana at junior and sub-junior levels in table tennis, baseball and softball.

At the age of 17, she moved to Jalandhar, Punjab and started her initial coaching in cricket and slowly became passionate about the sport.

== Career ==
Kesar started playing for Punjab Women in 2010. She was also part of the North Zone team from 2015 to 2018 and a member of GND University team from 2011 to 2015. She led the Under 23 Punjab's Women Cricket Team in the year 2015–2016.

She was named best bowler of the tournament in BCCI Senior Women Elite Group 2016-2017 and Rama Atray Memorial Tournament in 2016–2017.

She played for India A in 2021–22 Senior Women's Challenger Trophy in which India A emerged as the champions.
