= Priyanka Garkhede =

Indian cricketer

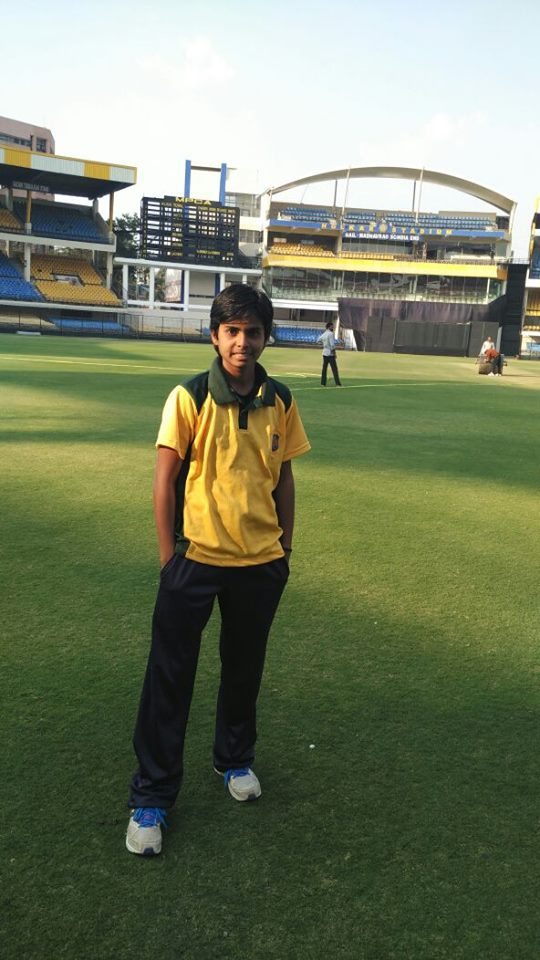
- Garkhede in 2015

Personal information
- Full name: Priyanka Bhivaji Garkhede
- Born: 13 August 1993 (age 33); Aurangabad, Maharashtra, India
- Batting: Right-handed
- Bowling: Right-arm medium
- Role: All-rounder

Domestic team information
- Years: Team
- 2010/11–present: Maharashtra
- 2012/13: West Zone
- 2017/18: West Zone

Career statistics
Competition	FC	LA	T20
Matches	2	67	64
Runs scored	2	335	271
Batting average	1.00	9.85	10.03
100s/50s	0/0	0/0	0/1
Top score	2	37	61
Balls bowled	162	2,247	887
Wickets	0	49	25
Bowling average	–	23.36	27.80
5 wickets in innings	–	0	0
10 wickets in match	–	0	0
Best bowling	–	4/41	3/1
Catches/stumpings	3/–	14/–	22/–
- Source: CricketArchive, 18 November 2021

Priyanka Bhivaji Garkhede (born 13 August 1993) is an Indian cricketer who currently plays for Maharashtra. She plays primarily as a right-arm medium bowler. She has previously played for West Zone, as well as being part of the India C squad in the 2021–22 Senior Women's Challenger Trophy. She captained Maharashtra during the 2020–21 season.

== Early life and background ==
Garkhede born in Aurangabad in Maharashtra. Her mother tongue is Marathi. She started playing cricket at the age of 4 and was picked for the Maharashtra team at the age of 12.
