= Kadambini Mohakud =

Cricketer

Personal information
- Born: 13 July 1982 (age 44); Dhenkanal, Orissa, India
- Batting: Right-handed
- Role: Wicket-keeper

Domestic team information
- Years: Team
- 2006–2019: Odisha
- 2006–2017: East Zone

Career statistics
Competition	FC	LA	T20
Matches	24	88	45
Runs scored	764	1,562	606
Batting average	31.83	21.10	18.36
100s/50s	1/10	0/10	0/1
Top score	100*	70	52*
Catches/stumpings	29/8	56/34	12/32
- Source: CricketArchive, 23 April 2025

Kadambini Mohakud is an Indian former cricketer. She was a right-handed batter and played for Odisha and East Zone. She has played First-class, List A and Women's Twenty20 cricket.

== Early life ==
Mohakud was born in 1982 in Gudianali, Dhenkanal district of Odisha to Madan Mohan Mohakud and Basanti Mohakud. She graduated in Arts from Dhenkanal College (Utkal University).
