= South Africa women's cricket team in India in 2020–21 =

International cricket tour

	India women	South Africa women
- Dates: 7 – 23 March 2021
Captains	Mithali Raj (WODIs); Smriti Mandhana (WT20Is)	Suné Luus (Note: Laura Wolvaardt captained South Africa Women for the third and fourth WODIs.)

One Day International series
- Results: South Africa women won the 5-match series 4–1
Most runs	Punam Raut (263)	Lizelle Lee (288)
Most wickets	Jhulan Goswami (8); Rajeshwari Gayakwad (8)	Shabnim Ismail (7)
- Player of the series: Lizelle Lee (SA)

Twenty20 International series
- Results: South Africa women won the 3-match series 2–1
Most runs	Shafali Verma (130)	Suné Luus (91)
Most wickets	Rajeshwari Gayakwad (4)	Shabnim Ismail (4)
- Player of the series: Shafali Verma (Ind)

The South Africa women's cricket team played against the India women's cricket team in March 2021. Five Women's One Day International (WODI) and three Women's Twenty20 International (WT20I) matches were played at the Ekana Cricket Stadium in Lucknow. Despite the short notice of the tour, Cricket South Africa confirmed that tests for COVID-19 had been done and the team was ready to travel. Prior to the tour, India's last international match was the final of the 2020 ICC Women's T20 World Cup on 8 March 2020. The South African team arrived in Lucknow on 26 February 2021, before undergoing six days of quarantine.

South Africa won the first WODI with India winning the second match to level the series at 1–1. South Africa then won the next two WODIs to win the series with a game to spare. South Africa won the fifth WODI by five wickets to take the series 4–1.

Ahead of the WT20I series, India's captain Harmanpreet Kaur was ruled out of the matches due to an injury, with Smriti Mandhana captaining India in her place. South Africa won the first two WT20I matches, recording their first series win against India in the format. India won the final match by nine wickets, with South Africa winning the series 2–1.

== Squads ==
WODIs		WT20Is	
India	South Africa	India	South Africa
Mithali Raj (c); Harmanpreet Kaur (vc); Yastika Bhatia; Rajeshwari Gayakwad; Jhulan Goswami; Dayalan Hemalatha; Mansi Joshi; Smriti Mandhana; Monica Patel; Challuru Prathyusha; Priya Punia; Punam Raut; Jemimah Rodrigues; Deepti Sharma; Sushma Verma (wk); Sweta Verma (wk); Poonam Yadav; Radha Yadav	Suné Luus (c); Anneke Bosch; Tazmin Brits; Trisha Chetty; Lara Goodall; Shabnim Ismail; Sinalo Jafta (wk); Marizanne Kapp; Ayabonga Khaka; Nadine de Klerk; Lizelle Lee; Nonkululeko Mlaba; Mignon du Preez; Tumi Sekhukhune; Nondumiso Shangase; Faye Tunnicliffe; Laura Wolvaardt	Smriti Mandhana (c); ~~Harmanpreet Kaur (c)~~; Simran Bahadur; Harleen Deol; Rajeshwari Gayakwad; Richa Ghosh; Mansi Joshi; Nuzhat Parween (wk); Monica Patel; Challuru Prathyusha; Arundhati Reddy; Jemimah Rodrigues; Deepti Sharma; Ayushi Soni; Shafali Verma; Sushma Verma (wk); Poonam Yadav; Radha Yadav	Suné Luus (c); Anneke Bosch; Tazmin Brits; Trisha Chetty; Lara Goodall; Shabnim Ismail; Sinalo Jafta; Marizanne Kapp; Ayabonga Khaka; Nadine de Klerk; Lizelle Lee; Nonkululeko Mlaba; Mignon du Preez; Tumi Sekhukhune; Nondumiso Shangase; Faye Tunnicliffe; Laura Wolvaardt

== WODI series ==
=== 1st WODI ===
7 March 2021
09:00
Scorecard

India; 177/9 (50 overs)	v	South Africa; 178/2 (40.1 overs)
Mithali Raj 50 (85); Shabnim Ismail 3/28 (10 overs)		Lizelle Lee 83* (122); Jhulan Goswami 2/38 (10 overs)

South Africa Women won by 8 wickets
Ekana Cricket Stadium, Lucknow
Umpires: Ulhas Gandhe (Ind) and C. K. Nandan (Ind)
Player of the match: Shabnim Ismail (SA)

- South Africa Women won the toss and elected to field.
- Monica Patel (Ind) made her WODI debut.
- Harmanpreet Kaur (Ind) played in her 100th WODI.

=== 2nd WODI ===
9 March 2021
09:00
Scorecard

South Africa; 157 (41 overs)	v	India; 160/1 (28.4 overs)
Lara Goodall 49 (77); Jhulan Goswami 4/42 (10 overs)		Smriti Mandhana 80* (64); Shabnim Ismail 1/46 (6 overs)

India Women won by 9 wickets
Ekana Cricket Stadium, Lucknow
Umpires: Belur Ravi (Ind) and Krishnamachari Srinivasan (Ind)
Player of the match: Jhulan Goswami (Ind)

- India Women won the toss and elected to field.

=== 3rd WODI ===
12 March 2021
09:00
Scorecard

India; 248/5 (50 overs)	v	South Africa; 223/4 (46.3 overs)
Punam Raut 77 (108); Shabnim Ismail 2/46 (10 overs)		Lizelle Lee 132* (131); Jhulan Goswami 2/20 (9 overs)

South Africa Women won by 6 runs (DLS method)
Ekana Cricket Stadium, Lucknow
Umpires: C. K. Nandan (Ind) and Belur Ravi (Ind)
Player of the match: Lizelle Lee (SA)

- South Africa Women won the toss and elected to field.
- South Africa Women were set a revised target of 218 runs from 46.3 overs due to rain.
- Laura Wolvaardt captained South Africa for the first time in WODIs.
- Mithali Raj became the first player for India to score 10,000 runs in women's international cricket.

=== 4th WODI ===
14 March 2021
09:00
Scorecard

India; 266/4 (50 overs)	v	South Africa; 269/3 (48.4 overs)
Punam Raut 104* (123); Tumi Sekhukhune 2/63 (8 overs)		Lizelle Lee 69 (75); Harmanpreet Kaur 1/38 (7 overs)

South Africa Women won by 7 wickets
Ekana Cricket Stadium, Lucknow
Umpires: Ulhas Gandhe (Ind) and Krishnamachari Srinivasan (Ind)
Player of the match: Mignon du Preez (SA)

- South Africa Women won the toss and elected to field.
- Radha Yadav (Ind) made her WODI debut.
- Shabnim Ismail became the first bowler for South Africa to take 150 wickets in WODIs.
- Mithali Raj (Ind) became the first cricketer to score 7,000 runs in WODIs.
- This was South Africa's highest successful run chase in WODIs.

=== 5th WODI ===
17 March 2021
09:00
Scorecard

India; 188 (49.3 overs)	v	South Africa; 189/5 (48.2 overs)
Mithali Raj 79* (104); Nadine de Klerk 3/35 (10 overs)		Anneke Bosch 58 (70); Rajeshwari Gayakwad 3/13 (10 overs)

South Africa Women won by 5 wickets
Ekana Cricket Stadium, Lucknow
Umpires: C. K. Nandan (Ind) and Belur Ravi (Ind)
Player of the match: Anneke Bosch (SA)

- South Africa Women won the toss and elected to field.
- Challuru Prathyusha (Ind) made her WODI debut.

== WT20I series ==
=== 1st WT20I ===
20 March 2021
19:00 (N)
Scorecard

India; 130/6 (20 overs)	v	South Africa; 133/2 (19.1 overs)
Harleen Deol 52 (47); Shabnim Ismail 3/14 (4 overs)		Anneke Bosch 66* (48); Arundhati Reddy 1/20 (3.1 overs)

South Africa Women won by 8 wickets
Ekana Cricket Stadium, Lucknow
Umpires: Belur Ravi (Ind) and Krishnamachari Srinivasan (Ind)
Player of the match: Anneke Bosch (SA)

- South Africa Women won the toss and elected to field.
- Simran Bahadur (Ind) made her WT20I debut.

=== 2nd WT20I ===
21 March 2021
19:00 (N)
Scorecard

India; 158/4 (20 overs)	v	South Africa; 159/4 (20 overs)
Shafali Verma 47 (31); Anneke Bosch 1/26 (3 overs)		Lizelle Lee 70 (45); Radha Yadav 1/25 (4 overs)

South Africa Women won by 6 wickets
Ekana Cricket Stadium, Lucknow
Umpires: Ulhas Gandhe (Ind) and C. K. Nandan (Ind)
Player of the match: Laura Wolvaardt (SA)

- South Africa Women won the toss and elected to field.

=== 3rd WT20I ===
23 March 2021
19:00 (N)
Scorecard

South Africa; 112/7 (20 overs)	v	India; 114/1 (11 overs)
Suné Luus 28 (25); Rajeshwari Gayakwad 3/9 (4 overs)		Shafali Verma 60 (30); Nondumiso Shangase 1/18 (2 overs)

India Women won by 9 wickets
Ekana Cricket Stadium, Lucknow
Umpires: Belur Ravi (Ind) and Krishnamachari Srinivasan (Ind)
Player of the match: Rajeshwari Gayakwad (Ind)

- India Women won the toss and elected to field.
- Ayushi Soni (Ind) made her WT20I debut.
