= Monica Patel =

Indian cricketer (born 1999)

Personal information
- Full name: Monica Patel
- Born: 26 April 1999 (age 27); Bangalore, Karnataka, India

International information
- National side: India
- ODI debut (cap 128): 7 March 2021 v South Africa
- Last ODI: 17 March 2021 v South Africa

Domestic team information
- Years: Team
- 2016/17–present: Karnataka
- 2022: Supernovas
- 2023: Gujarat Giants

Career statistics
Competition	WODI
Matches	2
Runs scored	13
Batting average	6.50
100s/50s	0/0
Top score	9
Balls bowled	80
Wickets	0
Bowling average	–
5 wickets in innings	0
10 wickets in match	0
Best bowling	–/–
Catches/stumpings	–/–
- Source: ESPNcricinfo, 25 May 2022

Monica Patel (born 26 April 1999) is an Indian cricketer. In February 2021, Patel earned her maiden call-up to the India women's cricket team, for their limited overs matches against South Africa. She made her Women's One Day International (WODI) debut for India, against South Africa, on 7 March 2021.
