= Challuru Prathyusha =

Indian cricketer (born 1998)

Personal information
- Full name: Challuru Prathyusha
- Born: 25 July 1998 (age 28); Kodappa, Karnataka, India
- Batting: Right-handed
- Bowling: Legbreak

International information
- National side: India
- Only ODI (cap 130): 17 March 2021 v South Africa

Domestic team information
- Years: Team
- 2021: Karnataka
- Source: ESPNcricinfo, 17 March 2021

Challuru Prathyusha (born 25 July 1998) is an Indian cricketer. In February 2021, Prathyusha earned her maiden call-up to the India women's cricket team, for their limited overs matches against South Africa. She made her Women's One Day International (WODI) debut for India, against South Africa, on 17 March 2021.
