= Sweta Verma =

Indian cricketer (born 1996)

Personal information
- Full name: Sweta Verma
- Born: 19 November 1996 (age 29)

International information
- National side: India
- Source: Cricinfo, 27 February 2021

Sweta Verma (born 19 November 1996) is an Indian cricketer. In February 2021, Verma earned her maiden call-up to the India women's cricket team, for their limited overs matches against South Africa.
