= Madhuri Mehta =

Indian cricketer (born 1991)

Personal information
- Born: 1 November 1991 (age 35); Balangir, Odisha, India
- Batting: Right-handed
- Bowling: Right-arm medium fast

International information
- National side: India
- ODI debut (cap 100): 29 February 2012 v West Indies
- Last ODI: 2 March 2012 v West Indies
- T20I debut (cap 32): 27 February 2012 v West Indies
- Last T20I: 30 March 2014 v Bangladesh

Domestic team information
- Years: Team
- 2008/09–present: Odisha
- 2010/11–present: East Zone

Career statistics
Competition	WODI	WT20I
Matches	2	3
Runs scored	25	23
Batting average	12.50	11.50
100s/50s	0/0	0/0
Top score	23	23
Balls bowled	–	–
Wickets	–	–
Bowling average	–	–
5 wickets in innings	–	–
10 wickets in match	–	–
Best bowling	–	–
Catches/stumpings	–/–	–/–
- Source: ESPNcricinfo, 7 January 2020

Madhuri Mehta (born 1 November 1991) is an Indian cricketer who plays for Odisha. She made her Women's One Day International and Women's Twenty20 International against the West Indies women's cricket team in 2012. She was the first cricketer from Odisha to play for the women's national team.
