= Ghanasyam Prabhu =

Indian cricket umpire

Ghanasyam Prabhu is an Indian cricket umpire. He has umpired 4 first-class, 18 women's one day and 13 women's Twenty20 matches.

Prabhu became a BCCI national-panel umpire in 2015. He umpired his first Ranji Trophy match in March 2022 when he stood in the Delhi vs Chhattisgarh fixture.
