= Mehak Gul =

Pakistani chess player

Personal information
- Born: 2000 (age 25–26) Lahore, Punjab, Pakistan

Chess career
- Country: Pakistan
- Title: Woman Candidate Master (2020)
- Peak rating: 1726 (March 2024)

Mehak Gul (born 2000) is a Pakistani chess player. She earned the FIDE title of Woman Candidate Master (WCM) at the 42nd Chess Olympiad. She was previously the youngest Pakistani to achieve this title She also holds the world record for arranging a chessboard in forty five seconds.

== Professional career ==
At the age of six Gull learnt to play chess. She secured third and fifth position at the Punjab Chess Championship in June 2012 and National Chess Championship respectively. Coached by her father she first participated in international chess event at the age of twelve, when she represented Pakistan at 40th Chess Olympiad held at Istanbul. She participated in 42nd Chess Olympiad held at Baku, Azerbaijan. Gul won six of the eleven matches she played and was titled Woman Candidate Master. She represented her school at Little Master Chess Tournament in November 2016 and earned the third spot.
