= Bandra Kurla Complex Ground =

Cricket ground

- BKC

Ground information
- Location: Bandra, Mumbai, Maharashtra, India
- Country: India
- Establishment: 2006
- Owner: Mumbai Metropolitan Region Development Authority
- Operator: Mumbai Cricket Association
- Tenants: Mumbai

International information
- First women's ODI: 1 March 2010: India v England
- Last women's ODI: 8 February 2013: New Zealand v Sri Lanka
- First women's T20I: 4 March 2010: India v England
- Last women's T20I: 8 March 2010: India v England
- As of 8 December 2019; Source: ESPNcricinfo

Bandra Kurla Complex Ground is a cricket ground in Bandra, Maharashtra. The ground normally hosts charity matches and some local matches. It also is home to the Mumbai Cricket Association.

== Overview ==
In 2007, Mumbai Cricket Association installed a recreation centre at the ground which forms part of their Indoor Cricket Academy. The Club House has top class sporting facilities ranging from a badminton hall with two courts - billiards and snookers hall, equipped with two imported billiards tables. Three pitches are for spin, three others for seam bowling while the seventh is a normal wicket.

In 2009, India under-19s for 2010 World Cup in New Zealand also did practice with Mike Young, Australian fielding coach.

The ground has also hosted women's ODI and T20I including two match of World Cup 2013. The Bandra Kurla Complex Ground has also hosted some matches which were part of the 2017 Blind T20 World Cup.
