= Odisha women's cricket team =

Indian domestic cricket team

Odisha Women
Personnel
- Captain: Madhusmita Behera
- Coach: Rumeli Dhar
- Owner: Odisha Cricket Association

Team information
- Founded: First recorded match: 1986
- Home ground: Barabati Stadium
- Capacity: 45,000

History
- WSODT wins: 0
- SWTL wins: 0

The Odisha women's cricket team is an Indian domestic cricket team representing the Indian state of Odisha. The team has represented the state in Women's Senior One Day Trophy (List A) and Women's Senior T20 Trophy, since the 2006–07 and 2008–09 seasons, respectively. Their best result so far has been as runners-up in the 2014–15 edition of the One-Day Trophy.

== Current squad ==
Current Odisha squad. Players with international caps are listed in bold.

Name	Birth date	Batting style	Bowling style	Notes
**Madhuri Mehta**	1 November 1991 (age 34)	Right-handed	Right-arm medium	Captain
Kajal Jena	14 July 1999 (age 27)	Right-handed	Right-arm off spin	
Sarita Meher	5 June 1990 (age 36)	Right-handed	Right-arm medium	
Sushree Dibyadarshini	6 September 1997 (age 28)	Right-handed	Right-arm off spin	
Subhra Swain	1 September 2003 (age 22)	Right-handed		
Reemalaxmi Ekka	6 March 1998 (age 28)	Right-handed		
**Rasanara Parwin**	4 May 1992 (age 34)	Right-handed	Right-arm off spin	
Pragyan Mohanty	19 October 1995 (age 30)	Right-handed	Right-arm leg spin	Wicket-keeper
Priyanka Priyadarshini	3 May 1992 (age 34)	Right-handed		
Indrani Chhatria	30 October 1999 (age 26)	Right-handed	Right-arm medium	
Rameswari Naik		Right-handed	Right-arm medium	
Laxmipriya Naik		Right-handed		
Rasmita Chinhara		Right-handed		Wicket-keeper
Silpa Swain	25 October 2000 (age 25)	Right-handed		
Banalata Mallick	25 June 1991 (age 35)	Left-handed	Left-arm medium	
Sujata Mallik	4 June 1993 (age 33)	Right-handed	Right-arm medium	
Taranna Pradhan	2 January 2001 (age 25)	Right-handed	Right-arm medium	

== Former players ==
- Kadambini Mohakud
- Swagatika Rath
- Madhusmita Behera

== Honours ==
- Women's Senior One Day Trophy:
  - Runners-up (1): 2014–15

== See also ==
- Odisha cricket team
