= ACA–KDCA Cricket Ground =

Cricket ground

ACA-KDCA Ground
- Interactive map of ACA-KDCA Ground

Ground information
- Location: Mulapadu, NTR district, Andhra Pradesh
- Country: India
- Coordinates: 16.6088°N 80.4702°E
- Establishment: 30 May 2016
- Owner: Krishna District Cricket Association
- Operator: Andhra Cricket Association
- End names
- n/a

International information
- First women's ODI: 10 November 2016: India v West Indies
- Last women's ODI: 16 November 2016: India v West Indies
- First women's T20I: 18 November 2016: India v West Indies
- Last women's T20I: 22 November 2016: India v West Indies

ACA–KDCA Cricket Ground (or Andhra Cricket Association–Krishna District Cricket Association Ground) is the common name for series of two cricket grounds located in the Indian state of Andhra Pradesh. It is located in the village of Mulapadu of NTR district, near Vijayawada. It is under the jurisdiction of Andhra Cricket Association and owned by Krishna district Cricket Association (ACA–KDCA).

Anurag Thakur has inaugurated the stadium on 30 May 2016. The southern ground was named as Chukkapalli Pitchaiah ground and the northern one as Devineni Venkata Ramana-Praneetha ground, which were officially inaugurated on 10 November 2016 by the Chief Minister of Andhra Pradesh, N. Chandrababu Naidu.

== Tournaments ==
On 10 November 2016, the stadium has hosted a series of international matches played between India women and West Indies women cricket teams, a part of 2014–16 ICC Women's Championship tournament.

=== Regional tournaments ===
It has earlier conducted tournaments such as, KDCA Power League Trophy and Future Cup tournaments on the two grounds of the KDCA at Mulapadu.

== See also ==
- ACA International Cricket Stadium
- Indira Gandhi Stadium, Vijayawada
