= Mulapadu =

- Village
- Interactive map of Mulapadu
- Location in Andhra Pradesh, India Mulapadu (India)
- Coordinates: 16.6088°N 80.4702°E
- Country: India
- State: Andhra Pradesh
- District: NTR
- Metro: APCRDA

Government
  - Type: Panchayat
  - Body: Grama Panchayati,APCRDA

Area
  - Total: 3.08 km^{2} (1.19 sq mi)

Population (2011)
  - Total: 4,188
  - Density: 1,408/km^{2} (3,650/sq mi)

Languages
  - Official: Telugu
- Time zone: UTC+5:30 (IST)
- Postal code: 521456
- Telephone code: +91–8659
- Vehicle registration: AP

Mulapadu is a village in NTR district of the Indian state of Andhra Pradesh. It is located in Vijayawada.

== Transport ==
APS RTC runs several City buses from Vijayawada and Ibrahimpatnam.Pallevelugu buses in Jaggayyapeta-Vijayawada, Penuganchiprolu-Vijayawada, Chandarlapadu-Vijayawada, Nandigama-Vijayawada routes makes a stopover at Mulapadu. NH 65 passes through the Village, which connects Vijayawada and Hyderabad.

Kondapalli railway station is the nearest train station at a distance of 13 km.

Vijayawada Airport is located about 45 kilometers away.

== Education ==
The village has a primary school and high school for imparting primary education. Further, law and international schools were also being planned to be set up at the village.

== Sports ==
The ACA-KDCA Cricket Ground at the village has cricket play fields owned by Krishna District Cricket Association under Andhra Cricket Association.

On 10 November 2016, the stadium has hosted a series of international matches played between India women and West Indies women cricket teams, a part of 2014–16 ICC Women's Championship tournament

== Tourism ==
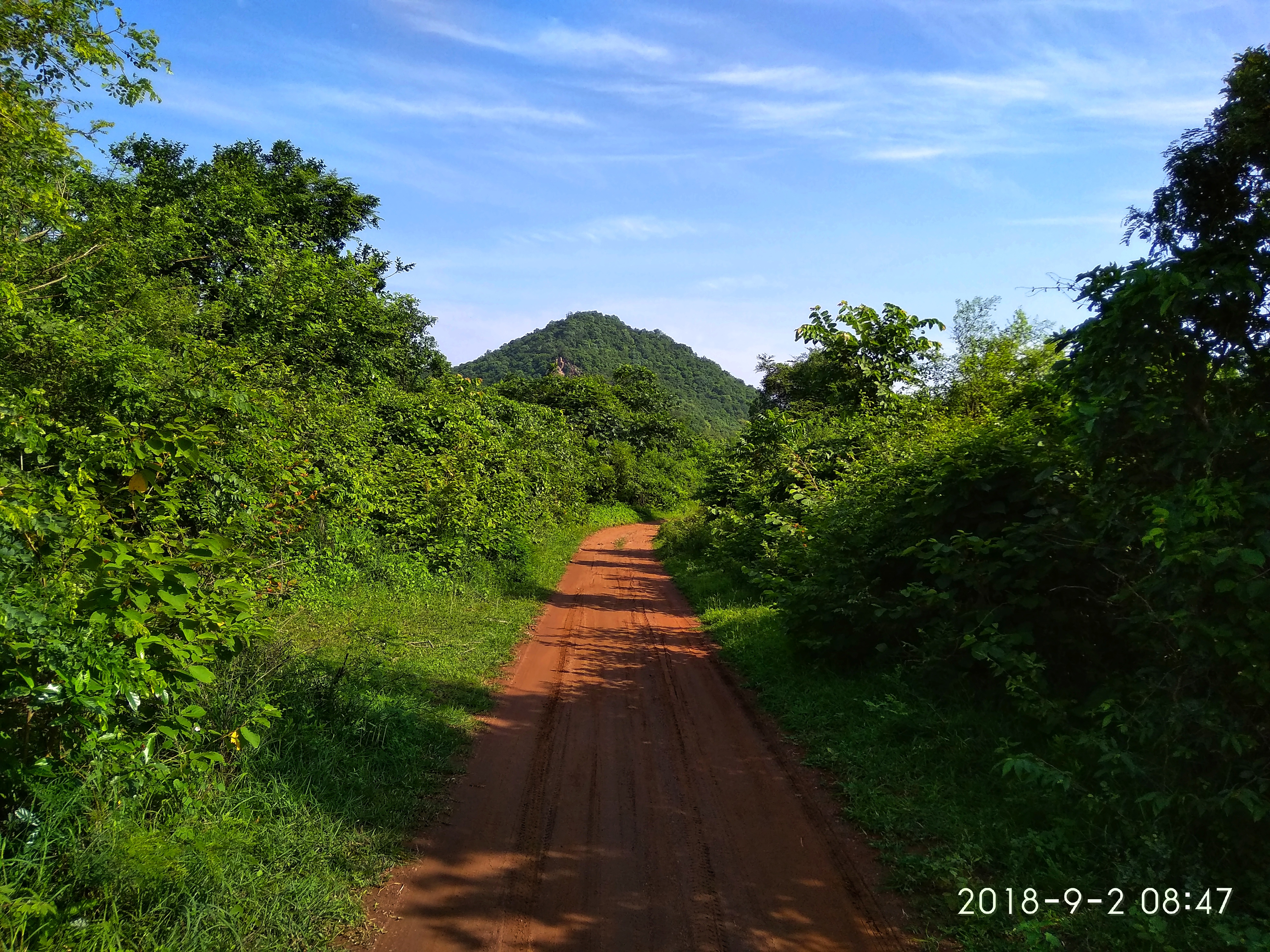
Mulapadu forest near Vijayawada

The village lies on the foot of Eastern ghats with numerous waterfalls and Dense forest.

Mulapadu block of the Kondapalli Reserve Forest is home to a variety of butterfly species, hence the Forest Department created the State's first butterfly park in the village. Sightings of three new species at Mulapadu butterfly park in Kondapalli Reserve Forest have brought success to the efforts by the forest department, NGOs and other stakeholders.

A significant dispute has developed over the donation of 400 acres of forest land to Jaggi Vasudev's Isha Foundation. Despite the approval of Villagers, the forest department denied the project over concern of deforestation. Later the project moved to Velliangiri in Coimbatore.
