= 2012–13 Senior Women's Challenger Trophy =

- Dates: 15 – 18 December 2012
- Administrator(s): BCCI
- Cricket format: 50 over
- Tournament format(s): Round-robin and final
- Champions: India Blue (2nd title)
- Runners-up: India Red
- Participants: 3
- Matches: 4
- Most runs: Thirush Kamini (152)
- Most wickets: Reema Malhotra (6); Ekta Bisht (6)

The 2012–13 Senior Women's Challenger Trophy was the fourth edition of India's 50 over Women's Challenger Trophy. Three teams made up of the best players in India competed in a round-robin group, with the top two advancing to the final. All matches were held at the Bandra Kurla Complex Ground, Mumbai across four days in December 2012. The tournament was won by India Blue, who beat India Red in the final by 60 runs. The other team in the tournament, India Green, were newly made an Under-19s team for this tournament.

== Competition format ==
The three teams played in a round-robin group, playing each other team once, with the top two advancing to the final. Matches were played using a 50 over format.

The group worked on a points system with positions with the group being based on the total points. Points were awarded as follows:

Win: 4 points.
Tie: 2 points.
Loss: 0 points.
No Result/Abandoned: 2 points.

If points in the final table are equal, teams are separated by their Net Run Rate.

== Squads ==
India Blue	India Green	India Red
Mithali Raj (c); Moksha Chaudhary; Nishu Chaudhary; Shweta Jadhav; Harmanpreet Kaur; Reema Malhotra; Sulakshana Naik (wk); Nagarajan Niranjana; Nishtha Pharasi; Punam Raut; Shubhlakshmi Sharma; Gouher Sultana; Sushma Verma (wk); Poonam Yadav	Nidhi Torvi (c); Gayatri Agarwal; Hemali Borwankar; Rita Debbarma; Saiqa Ishaque; Challa Lakshmi; Ravi Kalpana (wk); Sarika Koli; Anita Lodhi; Smriti Mandhana; Sabbhineni Meghana; Sneha Morey; Sneh Rana; Swagatika Rath; Deepti Sharma; Venkatasubramani Swetha	Amita Sharma (c); Ekta Bisht; Anagha Deshpande; Ritu Dhrub; Karu Jain (wk); Thirush Kamini; Veda Krishnamurthy; Latika Kumari; Mona Meshram; Rasanara Parwin; Anuja Patil; Kavita Patil; Nukala Sunitha (wk)

== Standings ==
Team	Pld	W	L	T	NR	BP	Pts	NRR
India Red (Q)	2	2	0	0	0	2	10	+1.923
India Blue (Q)	2	1	1	0	0	1	5	–1.115
India Green	2	0	2	0	0	0	0	–1.033

Source: ESPNcricinfo

== Group stage ==
Match 1
15 December 2012
Scorecard

India Red; 180/8 (50 overs)	v	India Blue; 45 (29 overs)
Thirush Kamini 43 (73); Reema Malhotra 3/37 (10 overs)		Nagarajan Niranjana 11 (19); Kavita Patil 3/7 (7 overs)

India Red won by 135 runs
Bandra Kurla Complex Ground, Mumbai
Umpires: Rama Krishna and Amardeep Pathania

- India Blue won the toss and elected to field.
- Points: India Red 5, India Blue 0.

Match 2
16 December 2012
Scorecard

India Green; 160/9 (50 overs)	v	India Red; 161/0 (35.5 overs)
Sarika Koli 50 (137); Ekta Bisht 3/27 (9 overs)		Thirush Kamini 95* (122)

India Red won by 10 wickets
Bandra Kurla Complex Ground, Mumbai
Umpires: Rama Krishna and Amardeep Pathania

- India Green won the toss and elected to bat.
- Points: India Red 5, India Green 0.

Match 3
17 December 2012
Scorecard

India Green; 153 (49.3 overs)	v	India Blue; 154/2 (39.5 overs)
Smriti Mandhana 69 (105); Gouher Sultana 2/20 (11.3 overs)		Punam Raut 74 (95); Gayatri Agarwal 1/7 (2.5 overs)

India Blue won by 8 wickets
Bandra Kurla Complex Ground, Mumbai
Umpires: Rama Krishna and Amardeep Pathania

- India Blue won the toss and elected to field.
- Points: India Blue 5, India Green 0.

== Final ==
18 December 2012
Scorecard

India Blue; 225/5 (50 overs)	v	India Red; 165 (48.2 overs)
Mithali Raj 119 (137); Ekta Bisht 2/65 (12 overs)		Latika Kumari 65 (89); Mithali Raj 2/6 (2.2 overs)

India Blue won by 60 runs
Bandra Kurla Complex Ground, Mumbai
Umpires: Rama Krishna and Amardeep Pathania

- India Blue won the toss and elected to bat.

== Statistics ==
=== Most runs ===
Player	Team	Matches	Innings	Runs	Average	HS	100s	50s
Thirush Kamini	India Red	3	3	152	76.00	95*	0	1
Mithali Raj	India Blue	3	3	127	63.50	119	1	0
Punam Raut	India Blue	3	3	122	40.66	74	0	1
Smriti Mandhana	India Green	2	2	116	58.00	69	0	1
Anagha Deshpande	India Red	2	2	83	83.00	53*	0	1

Source: CricketArchive

=== Most wickets ===
Player	Team	Overs	Wickets	Average	BBI	5w
Reema Malhotra	India Blue	25.0	6	14.66	3/37	0
Ekta Bisht	India Red	26.0	6	17.33	3/27	0
Shubhlakshmi Sharma	India Blue	30.0	4	23.75	2/32	0
Rasanara Parwin	India Red	23.0	4	25.25	2/52	0
Nagarajan Niranjana	India Blue	26.0	4	25.50	2/32	0

Source: CricketArchive
