= 2009–10 Senior Women's T20 Challenger Trophy =

- Dates: 2 – 5 January 2010
- Administrator(s): BCCI
- Cricket format: Twenty20
- Tournament format(s): Round-robin and final
- Champions: India Green (1st title)
- Runners-up: India Blue
- Participants: 3
- Matches: 4
- Most runs: Mithali Raj (74)
- Most wickets: Soniya Dabir (3); Ekta Bisht (3)

The 2009–10 Senior Women's T20 Challenger Trophy was the inaugural season of India's Women's T20 Challenger Trophy. Three teams made up of the best players in India competed in a round-robin group, with the top two advancing to the final. India Green beat India Blue in the final by 24 runs to win the tournament. All matches were held at the Sardar Patel Stadium, Ahmedabad across four days in January 2010. The tournament is the Twenty20 equivalent of the Senior Women's Challenger Trophy, and was not played again until the 2018–19 season.

== Competition format ==
The three teams played in a round-robin group, playing each other team once, with the top two advancing to the final. Matches were played using a Twenty20 format.

The group worked on a points system with positions with the group being based on the total points. Points were awarded as follows:

Win: 4 points.
Tie: 2 points.
Loss: 0 points.
No Result/Abandoned: 2 points.

If points in the final table are equal, teams are separated by most wins, then head-to-head record, and then by Net Run Rate.

== Squads ==
India Blue	India Green	India Red
Reema Malhotra (c); Kathakali Banerjee; Ekta Bisht; Varsha Choudhary; Anagha Deshpande (wk); Shweta Jadhav; Veda Krishnamurthy; Latika Kumari; Snehal Pradhan; Mithali Raj; Sapna Randhawa; Lalita Sharma	Jhulan Goswami (c); Nishu Choudhary; Soniya Dabir; Harmanpreet Kaur; Sulakshana Naik (wk); Payal Panchal; Shikha Pandey; Punam Raut; Asha Rawat; Priyanka Roy; Pooja Sharma; Gouher Sultana	Amita Sharma (c); Anjum Chopra; Diana David; Rumeli Dhar; Thirush Kamini; Mamatha Kanojia; Samantha Lobatto (wk); Neha Maji; Babita Mandlik; Niranjana Nagarajan; Neha Tanwar

== Standings ==
Team	Pld	W	L	T	NR	Pts	NRR
India Blue (Q)	2	1	1	0	0	4	+0.177
India Green (Q)	2	1	1	0	0	4	–0.079
India Red	2	1	1	0	0	4	–0.106

Source: ESPNcricinfo

== Group stage ==
Match 1
2 January 2010
Scorecard

India Blue; 117/4 (20 overs)	v	India Red; 119/5 (19.2 overs)
Anagha Deshpande 48 (50); Neha Maji 1/28 (4 overs)		Anjum Chopra 34* (39); Snehal Pradhan 1/14 (4 overs)

India Red won by 5 wickets
Sardar Patel Stadium, Ahmedabad
Umpires: Sumit Bansal and Yeshwant Barde

- India Blue won the toss and elected to bat.
- Points: India Red 4, India Blue 0.

Match 2
3 January 2010
Scorecard

India Red; 121/6 (20 overs)	v	India Green; 122/3 (18.3 overs)
Thirush Kamini 46 (48); Jhulan Goswami 3/13 (4 overs)		Sulakshana Naik 66* (58); Diana David 2/20 (4 overs)

India Green won by 7 wickets
Sardar Patel Stadium, Ahmedabad
Umpires: Sumit Bansal and Yeshwant Barde

- India Green won the toss and elected to field.
- Points: India Green 4, India Red 0.

Match 3
4 January 2010
Scorecard

India Green; 109/6 (20 overs)	v	India Blue; 110/3 (18 overs)
Sulakshana Naik 36 (42); Nishu Choudhary 1/9 (1 over)		Reema Malhotra 31* (23); Soniya Dabir 1/13 (4 overs)

India Blue won by 7 wickets
Sardar Patel Stadium, Ahmedabad
Umpires: Belur Ravi and Viswanath

- India Blue won the toss and elected to field.
- Points: India Blue 4, India Green 0.

== Final ==
5 January 2010
Scorecard

India Green; 125/9 (20 overs)	v	India Blue; 101/7 (20 overs)
Punam Raut 42 (45); Reema Malhotra 2/19 (4 overs)		Varsha Choudhary 28 (30); Jhulan Goswami 2/7 (4 overs)

India Green won by 24 runs
Sardar Patel Stadium, Ahmedabad
Umpires: Belur Ravi and Viswanath

- India Blue won the toss and elected to field.

== Statistics ==
=== Most runs ===
Player	Team	Matches	Innings	Runs	Average	HS	100s	50s
Mithali Raj	India Blue	3	3	74	37.00	41	0	0
Anagha Deshpande	India Blue	3	3	70	23.33	48	0	0
Punam Raut	India Green	2	2	62	31.00	42	0	0
Reema Malhotra	India Green	3	3	46	46.00	31*	0	0
Sulakshana Naik	India Green	2	2	42	21.00	36	0	0

Source: ESPNcricinfo

=== Most wickets ===
Player	Team	Overs	Wickets	Average	BBI	5w
Soniya Dabir	India Green	8.0	3	8.66	2/13	0
Ekta Bisht	India Blue	12.0	3	21.66	1/17	0
Jhulan Goswami	India Green	7.0	2	13.50	2/7	0
Snehal Pradhan	India Blue	12.0	2	27.50	1/14	0
Reema Malhotra	India Blue	10.2	2	29.50	2/19	0

Source: ESPNcricinfo
