= 2010–11 Senior Women's Challenger Trophy =

- Dates: 9 – 12 December 2012
- Administrator(s): BCCI
- Cricket format: 50 over
- Tournament format(s): Round-robin and final
- Champions: India Blue (1st title)
- Runners-up: India Green
- Participants: 3
- Matches: 4
- Most runs: Thirush Kamini (145)
- Most wickets: Priyanka Roy (8)

The 2010–11 Senior Women's Challenger Trophy was the second edition of India's 50 over Women's Challenger Trophy. Three teams made up of the best players in India competed in a round-robin group, with the top two advancing to the final. Matches were held at the Dr. Y. S. Rajasekhara Reddy ACA–VDCA Cricket Stadium, Visakhapatnam across four days in December 2010. The tournament was won by India Blue, who beat India Green in the final by 7 wickets.

== Competition format ==
The three teams played in a round-robin group, playing each other team once, with the top two advancing to the final. Matches were played using a 50 over format.

The group worked on a points system with positions with the group being based on the total points. Points were awarded as follows:

Win: 4 points.
Tie: 2 points.
Loss: 0 points.
No Result/Abandoned: 2 points.

If points in the final table are equal, teams are separated by their Net Run Rate.

== Squads ==
India Blue	India Green	India Red
Mithali Raj (c); Ekta Bisht; Nishu Chaudhary; Archana Das; Rumeli Dhar; Shilpa Gupta; Shweta Jadhav; Karu Jain (wk); Harmanpreet Kaur; Mona Meshram; Sulakshana Naik (wk); Shubhlakshmi Sharma	Jhulan Goswami (c); Varsha Choudhary; Soniya Dabir; Diana David; Anagha Deshpande (wk); Preeti Dimri; Thirush Kamini; Latika Kumari; Shashi Malik; Kadambini Mohakud; Niranjana Nagarajan; Priyanka Roy	Reema Malhotra (c); Veda Krishnamurthy; Samantha Lobatto (wk); Sunetra Paranjpe; Snehal Pradhan; Punam Raut; Sheral Rozario; Amita Sharma; Jaya Sharma; Lalita Sharma; Gouher Sultana; Neha Tanwar

== Standings ==
Team	Pld	W	L	T	NR	BP	Pts	NRR
India Blue (Q)	2	1	0	0	1	1	7	+0.860
India Green (Q)	2	1	1	0	0	0	4	–0.461
India Red	2	0	1	0	1	0	2	–0.102

Source: CricketArchive

== Group stage ==
Match 1
9 December 2010
Scorecard

India Blue	v	India Red

Match Abandoned
Dr. Y. S. Rajasekhara Reddy ACA–VDCA Cricket Stadium, Visakhapatnam
Umpires: Puttarangaiah Jayapal and Vineet Kulkarni

- No toss.
- No play possible due to rain.
- Points: India Blue 2, India Red 2.

Match 2
10 December 2010
Scorecard

India Red; 112 (33.5 overs)	v	India Green; 113/7 (35.1 overs)
Neha Tanwar 34 (57); Priyanka Roy 4/20 (6 overs)		Diana David 29* (43); Gouher Sultana 3/6 (6.1 overs)

India Green won by 3 wickets
Dr. Y. S. Rajasekhara Reddy ACA–VDCA Cricket Stadium, Visakhapatnam
Umpires: Puttarangaiah Jayapal and Vineet Kulkarni

- India Green won the toss and elected to field.
- Points: India Green 4, India Red 0.

Match 3
11 December 2010
Scorecard

India Blue; 167/8 (50 overs)	v	India Green; 124 (48.2 overs)
Mithali Raj 53 (65); Preeti Dimri 2/25 (9 overs)		Thirush Kamini 41 (71); Ekta Bisht 3/21 (9.2 overs)

India Blue won by 43 runs
Dr. Y. S. Rajasekhara Reddy ACA–VDCA Cricket Stadium, Visakhapatnam
Umpires: Anil Dandekar and Vishwas Nerurkar

- India Blue won the toss and elected to bat.
- Points: India Blue 5, India Green 0.

== Final ==
12 December 2010
Scorecard

India Green; 192/4 (50 overs)	v	India Blue; 193/3 (47.4 overs)
Thirush Kamini 78 (84); Shilpa Gupta 3/33 (10 overs)		Mithali Raj 53* (41); Priyanka Roy 2/43 (9 overs)

India Blue won by 7 wickets
Dr. Y. S. Rajasekhara Reddy ACA–VDCA Cricket Stadium, Visakhapatnam
Umpires: Anil Dandekar and Vishwas Nerurkar

- India Green won the toss and elected to bat.

== Statistics ==
=== Most runs ===
Player	Team	Matches	Innings	Runs	Average	HS	100s	50s
Thirush Kamini	India Green	3	3	145	48.33	78	0	1
Mithali Raj	India Blue	2	2	106	106.00	53*	0	2
Diana David	India Green	3	3	61	30.50	29*	0	0
Shweta Jadhav	India Blue	2	2	60	30.00	38	0	0
Anagha Deshpande	India Green	3	3	59	19.66	35	0	0

Source: ESPNcricinfo

=== Most wickets ===
Player	Team	Overs	Wickets	Average	BBI	5w
Priyanka Roy	India Green	23.0	8	13.12	4/20	0
Gouher Sultana	India Red	6.1	3	2.00	3/6	0
Shilpa Gupta	India Blue	20.0	3	16.66	3/33	0
Ekta Bisht	India Blue	19.2	3	18.33	3/21	0
Shashi Malik	India Green	15.0	3	19.00	2/7	0

Source: ESPNcricinfo
