= 2011–12 Senior Women's Challenger Trophy =

- Dates: 1 – 4 October 2011
- Administrator(s): BCCI
- Cricket format: 50 over
- Tournament format(s): Round-robin and final
- Champions: India Red (1st title)
- Runners-up: India Blue
- Participants: 3
- Matches: 4

The 2011–12 Senior Women's Challenger Trophy was the third edition of India's 50 over Women's Challenger Trophy. Three teams made up of the best players in India competed in a round-robin group, with the top two advancing to the final. Matches were held at the Reliance Cricket Stadium and the Moti Bagh Stadium in Vadodara across four days in October 2011. The tournament was won by India Red, who beat India Blue in the final by 41 runs.

== Competition format ==
The three teams played in a round-robin group, playing each other team once, with the top two advancing to the final. Matches were played using a 50 over format.

The group worked on a points system with positions with the group being based on the total points. Points were awarded as follows:

Win: 4 points.
Tie: 2 points.
Loss: 0 points.
No Result/Abandoned: 2 points.

If points in the final table are equal, teams are separated by their Net Run Rate.

== Squads ==
India Blue	India Green	India Red
Jhulan Goswami (c); Nooshin Al Khadeer; Monika Das; Diana David; Anagha Deshpande (wk); Shweta Jadhav; Harmanpreet Kaur; Veda Krishnamurthy; Samantha Lobatto (wk); Punam Raut; Gouher Sultana; Neha Tanwar	Priyanka Roy (c); Sobhana Asha; Harpreet Dhillon; Mandira Mahapatra; Mona Meshram; Ananya Mitra (wk); Rasanara Parwin; Tarannum Pathan; Anuja Patil; Sheral Rozario; Shubhlakshmi Sharma; Shivangiraj Singh	Amita Sharma (c); Salma Banu; Ekta Bisht; Varsha Choudhary; Archana Das; Shilpa Gupta; Mridula Jadeja; Karu Jain (wk); Madhuri Mehta; Nagarajan Niranjana; Mantravadi Shalini; Poonam Yadav

Source: CricketArchive

== Standings ==
Team	Pld	W	L	T	NR	BP	Pts	NRR
India Blue (Q)	2	2	0	0	0	2	10	+1.280
India Red (Q)	2	1	1	0	0	0	4	–0.300
India Green	2	0	2	0	0	0	0	–0.980

Source: CricketArchive

== Group stage ==
Match 1
1 October 2011
Scorecard

India Blue; 182 (49.2 overs)	v	India Red; 142 (45.2 overs)
Shweta Jadhav 56 (98); Nagarajan Niranjana 2/18 (8 overs)		Nagarajan Niranjana 32 (29); Nooshin Al Khadeer 3/13 (8.2 overs)

India Blue won by 40 runs
Reliance Cricket Stadium, Vadodara
Umpires: Keki Doodhwala and Piyush Khakhar

- India Blue won the toss and elected to bat.
- Points: India Blue 5, India Red 0.

Match 2
2 October 2011
Scorecard

India Red; 159 (45 overs)	v	India Green; 149 (47.2 overs)
Archana Das 24 (43); Harpreet Dhillon 2/13 (5 overs)		Mandira Mahapatra 45 (92); Amita Sharma 2/17 (7 overs)

India Red won by 10 runs
Reliance Cricket Stadium, Vadodara
Umpires: Keki Doodhwala and Piyush Khakhar

- India Red won the toss and elected to bat.
- Points: India Red 4, India Green 0.

Match 3
3 October 2011
Scorecard

India Blue; 239/6 (50 overs)	v	India Green; 151/7 (50 overs)
Punam Raut 89 (108); Anuja Patil 2/35 (6 overs)		Anuja Patil 41 (71); Diana David 3/22 (9 overs)

India Blue won by 88 runs
Moti Bagh Stadium, Vadodara
Umpires: Keki Doodhwala and Adil Palia

- India Blue won the toss and elected to bat.
- Points: India Blue 5, India Green 0.

== Final ==
4 October 2011
Scorecard

India Red; 179/8 (50 overs)	v	India Blue; 138 (43.1 overs)
Amita Sharma 56 (82); Nooshin Al Khadeer 3/29 (10 overs)		Harmanpreet Kaur 78 (98); Poonam Yadav 3/19 (8 overs)

India Red won by 41 runs
Moti Bagh Stadium, Vadodara
Umpires: Keki Doodhwala and Adil Palia

- India Red won the toss and elected to bat.
