= 2008–09 Senior Women's Challenger Trophy =

- Dates: 2 – 5 October 2008
- Administrator(s): BCCI
- Cricket format: 50 over
- Tournament format(s): Round-robin and final
- Champions: India B (1st title)
- Runners-up: India A
- Participants: 3
- Matches: 4
- Most runs: Hemlata Kala (93)
- Most wickets: Diana David (7)

The 2008–09 Senior Women's Challenger Trophy was the inaugural edition of India's 50 over Women's Challenger Trophy. Three teams made up of the best players in India competed in a round-robin group, with the top two advancing to the final. Matches were held at the Sardar Patel Stadium, Ahmedabad across four days in October 2008. The tournament was won by India B, who beat India A in the final by 6 wickets.

== Competition format ==
The three teams played in a round-robin group, playing each other team once, with the top two advancing to the final. Matches were played using a 50 over format.

The group worked on a points system with positions with the group being based on the total points. Points were awarded as follows:

Win: 2 points.
Tie: 2 points.
Loss: 0 points.
No Result/Abandoned: 2 points.

If points in the final table are equal, teams are separated by their Net Run Rate.

== Squads ==
India A	India B	India Senior
Rumeli Dhar (c); Nooshin Al Khadeer; Pallavi Bharadwaj; Diana David; Neetu Jaiswal; Hemlata Kala; Thirush Kamini; Reema Malhotra; Shashi Malik; Niranjana Nagarajan; Sulakshana Naik (wk); Sindhu Sriharsha	Amita Sharma (c); Anjum Chopra; Archana Das; Preeti Dimri; Rajeshwari Goyal; Karu Jain (wk); Gurdeep Kaur (wk); Harmanpreet Kaur; Latika Kumari; Snehal Pradhan; Punam Raut; Jaya Sharma; Amrita Shinde	Jhulan Goswami (c); Priyanka Roy; Shweta Jadhav; Vellaswamy Vanitha; Anagha Deshpande; Lalita Sharma; Anureet Kaur; Asha Rawat; Seema Pujare; Monica Sharma; Gouher Sultana; Swaroopa Kadam

== Standings ==
Team	Pld	W	L	T	NR	BP	Pts	NRR
India B (Q)	2	1	1	0	0	0	2	+0.120
India A (Q)	2	1	1	0	0	0	2	–0.010
India Senior	2	1	1	0	0	0	2	–0.110

Source: CricketArchive

== Group stage ==
Match 1
2 October 2008
Scorecard

India A 185 (49.5 overs)	v	India Senior; 154 (47.2 overs)
Reema Malhotra 57 (83); Gouher Sultana 2/28 (10 overs)		Priyanka Roy 77 (137); Nooshin Al Khadeer 3/27 (10 overs)

India A won by 31 runs
Sardar Patel Stadium, Ahmedabad
Umpires: Rajiv Risodkar and Sameer Bandekar

- India Senior won the toss and elected to field.
- Points: India A 2, India Senior 0.

Match 2
3 October 2008
Scorecard

India Senior; 194/9 (50 overs)	v	India B 174 (47.2 overs)
Jhulan Goswami 45* (47); Preeti Dimri 2/20 (10 overs)		Amita Sharma 70 (81); Swaroopa Kadam 4/18 (9.2 overs)

India Senior won by 20 runs
Sardar Patel Stadium, Ahmedabad
Umpires: Rajiv Risodkar and Sameer Bandekar

- India Senior won the toss and elected to bat.
- Points: India Senior 2, India B 0.

Match 3
4 October 2008
Scorecard

India B 202 (47 overs)	v	India A 170/8 (50 overs)
Latika Kumari 54 (79); Reema Malhotra 4/52 (9 overs)		Hemlata Kala 39* (51); Amrita Shinde 3/39 (10 overs)

India B won by 32 runs
Sardar Patel Stadium, Ahmedabad
Umpires: Milind Pathak and PS Godbole

- India B won the toss and elected to bat.
- Points: India B 2, India A 0.

== Final ==
5 October 2008
Scorecard

India A 122 (48.1 overs)	v	India B 123/4 (32.5 overs)
Hemlata Kala 32 (65); Snehal Pradhan 3/20 (7 overs)		Jaya Sharma 58* (98); Diana David 3/19 (7 overs)

India B won by 6 wickets
Sardar Patel Stadium, Ahmedabad
Umpires: Milind Pathak and PS Godbole

- India A won the toss and elected to bat.

== Statistics ==
=== Most runs ===
Player	Team	Matches	Innings	Runs	Average	HS	100s	50s
Hemlata Kala	India A	3	3	93	46.50	39*	0	0
Jaya Sharma	India B	2	2	92	92.00	58*	0	1
Priyanka Roy	India Senior	2	2	77	38.50	77	0	1
Amita Sharma	India B	3	2	71	35.50	70	0	1
Reema Malhotra	India A	3	3	66	22.00	57	0	1

Source: ESPNcricinfo

=== Most wickets ===
Player	Team	Overs	Wickets	Average	BBI	5w
Diana David	India A	21.2	7	7.57	3/19	0
Snehal Pradhan	India B	23.0	6	15.50	3/20	0
Reema Malhotra	India A	24.0	6	18.00	4/52	0
Swaroopa Kadam	India Senior	19.2	5	8.40	4/18	0
Amrita Shinde	India B	25.0	5	16.40	3/39	0

Source: ESPNcricinfo
