= 2012 Women's World Twenty20 squads =

This is a list of the squads picked for the 2012 ICC Women's World Twenty20 tournament.

== Australia ==
- Jodie Fields (captain)
- Alex Blackwell
- Jess Cameron
- Nicola Carey
- Lauren Ebsary
- Rachael Haynes
- Alyssa Healy (wk)
- Julie Hunter
- Jess Jonassen
- Meg Lanning
- Erin Osborne
- Ellyse Perry
- Leah Poulton
- Lisa Sthalekar
- Sarah Coyte

== England ==
- Charlotte Edwards (captain)
- Tammy Beaumont (wk)
- Arran Brindle
- Katherine Brunt
- Holly Colvin
- Lydia Greenway
- Jenny Gunn
- Danielle Hazell
- Amy Jones
- Heather Knight
- Laura Marsh
- Anya Shrubsole
- Sarah Taylor
- Danielle Wyatt
- Susie Rowe (withdrawn)

== India ==
- Mithali Raj (captain)
- Harmanpreet Kaur
- Ekta Bisht
- Archana Das
- Jhulan Goswami
- Reema Malhotra
- Mona Meshram
- Sulakshana Naik (wk)
- Nagarajan Niranjana
- Rasanara Parwin
- Anuja Patil
- Poonam Raut
- Amita Sharma
- Shubhlakshmi Sharma
- Gouher Sultana (withdrawn)

== New Zealand ==
- Suzie Bates (captain)
- Erin Bermingham
- Kate Broadmore
- Nicola Browne
- Sophie Devine
- Lucy Doolan
- Sara McGlashan
- Frances Mackay
- Katey Martin (wk)
- Morna Nielsen
- Katie Perkins
- Liz Perry
- Sian Ruck
- Amy Satterthwaite

== Pakistan ==
- Sana Mir (captain)
- Nain Abidi
- Asmavia Iqbal
- Batool Fatima (wk)
- Bismah Maroof
- Elizebath Khan
- Javeria Khan
- Javeria Rauf
- Marina Iqbal
- Nahida Khan
- Nida Dar
- Qanita Jalil
- Sadia Yousuf
- Sumaiya Siddiqi
- Masooma Junaid (withdrawn)

== South Africa ==
- Mignon du Preez (captain)
- Trisha Chetty (wk)
- Susan Benade
- Dinesha Devnarain
- Shandre Fritz
- Alison Hodgkinson
- Shabnim Ismail
- Marizanne Kapp
- Ayabonga Khaka
- Marcia Letsoalo
- Sunette Loubser
- Suné Luus
- Yolandi van der Westhuizen
- Dane van Niekerk

== Sri Lanka ==
- Shashikala Siriwardene (captain)
- Sandamali Dolawatte
- Inoka Galagedara
- Chamari Atapattu
- Eshani Lokusuriyage
- Yasoda Mendis
- Udeshika Prabodhani
- Inoka Ranaweera
- Deepika Rasangika
- Maduri Samuddika
- Chamani Seneviratna
- Dilani Manodara (wk)
- Prasadani Weerakkody
- Sripali Weerakkody
- Nilakshi de Silva (withdrawn)

== West Indies ==
- Merissa Aguilleira (captain, wk)
- Stafanie Taylor
- Shemaine Campbelle
- Britney Cooper
- Shanel Daley
- Deandra Dottin
- Stacy-Ann King
- Kycia Knight
- Anisa Mohammed
- Subrina Munroe
- Juliana Nero
- Shaquana Quintyne
- Shakera Selman
- Tremayne Smartt

== See also ==
- 2012 ICC World Twenty20 squads
