= 2016–17 Senior Women's Challenger Trophy =

- Dates: 22 October 2016 – 25 October 2016
- Administrator(s): BCCI
- Cricket format: 50 over
- Tournament format(s): Round-robin and final
- Host(s): BCA
- Champions: India Red (2nd title)
- Runners-up: India Blue
- Participants: 3
- Matches: 4
- Most runs: Smriti Mandhana (192) (India Red)
- Most wickets: Poonam Yadav (6) (India Blue)

The 2016–17 Senior Women's Challenger Trophy was the seventh edition of the women's List-A tournament in India. It was played from 22 October to 25 October 2016. It was played in a round-robin format, with a final between the top two teams. India Red won the tournament, beating India Blue in the final by 7 wickets.

== Squads ==
India Blue	India Green	India Red
Mithali Raj (c); Madhusmita Behera; Preeti Bose; Mansi Joshi; Veda Krishnamurthy; Mona Meshram; Shikha Pandey; Anuja Patil; Kavita Patil; Punam Raut; Sushma Verma (wk); Poonam Yadav	Deepti Sharma (c); Neeragattu Anusha; Manali Dakshine; Suman Gulia; Disha Kasat; Sanjula Naik; Ellutla Padmaja; Yashi Pandey; Nuzhat Parween (wk); Challuru Prathyusha; Jemimah Rodrigues; Tanusree Sarkar; Radha Yadav	Harmanpreet Kaur (c); Ekta Bisht; Rajeshwari Gayakwad; Jhulan Goswami; Dayalan Hemalatha; Ravi Kalpana (wk); Mandeep Kaur; Smriti Mandhana; Sabbhineni Meghana; Niranjana Nagarajan; Sukanya Parida; Devika Vaidya; Vellaswamy Vanitha

== Standings ==
Team	Pld	W	L	T	NR	Pts	NRR
India Blue (Q)	2	2	0	0	0	8	+0.240
India Red (Q)	2	1	1	0	0	4	+0.280
India Green	2	0	2	0	0	0	–0.460

Source: CricketArchive

== Group stage ==
22 October 2016
Scorecard

India Red; 183/9 (50 overs)	v	India Blue; 184/9 (49.2 overs)
Smriti Mandhana 67 (83); Poonam Yadav 4/38 (10 overs)		Veda Krishnamurthy 87 (87); Ekta Bisht 2/37 (10 overs)

India Blue won by 1 wicket
Moti Bagh Stadium, Vadodara
Umpires: Kittur Ramesh Nagaraj and Abhiroope Sud
Player of the match: Veda Krishnamurthy (Blue)

- India Blue won the toss and elected to field.

23 October 2016
Scorecard

India Green; 152/8 (50 overs)	v	India Red; 154/4 (42 overs)
Deepti Sharma 41 (92); Jhulan Goswami 2/25 (10 overs)		Smriti Mandhana 63 (86); Deepti Sharma 1/15 (10 overs)

India Red won by 6 wickets
Moti Bagh Stadium, Vadodara
Umpires: Kittur Ramesh Nagaraj and Abhiroope Sud
Player of the match: Smriti Mandhana (Red)

- India Red won the toss and elected to field.

24 October 2016
Scorecard

India Blue; 111 (45.1 overs)	v	India Green; 90 (43.2 overs)
Shikha Pandey 37 (54); Tanusree Sarkar 3/7 (4.1 overs)		Neeragattu Anusha 21 (28); Madhusmita Behera 3/13 (4.3 overs)

India Blue won by 21 runs
Moti Bagh Stadium, Vadodara
Umpires: Kittur Ramesh Nagaraj and Abhiroope Sud
Player of the match: Shikha Pandey (Blue)

- India Blue won the toss and elected to bat.

== Final ==
25 October 2016
Scorecard

India Blue; 129/9 (50 overs)	v	India Red; 131/3 (30.4 overs)
Sushma Verma 35* (63); Sukanya Parida 2/13 (5 overs)		Smriti Mandhana 62 (82); Preeti Bose 2/24 (8 overs)

India Red won by 7 wickets
Moti Bagh Stadium, Vadodara
Umpires: Kittur Ramesh Nagaraj and Abhiroope Sud
Player of the match: Smriti Mandhana (Red)

- India Red won the toss and elected to field.

== Overview ==
The Mithali Raj-led India Blue had won both their league matches to book a place in the finals while India Red had only beaten India Green in the run up to the finals. With a seven-wicket win against India Blue in the final, India Red lifted the Women's Challenger Trophy 2016–17. Smriti Mandhana led the 130-run chase in the one-day game with an unbeaten 62-run knock after the Jhulan Goswami-led attack had restricted the opposition to a sub-par score.
