= 2013–14 Senior Women's Challenger Trophy =

- Dates: 7 – 10 January 2014
- Administrator: BCCI
- Cricket format: 50 over
- Tournament format(s): Round-robin and final
- Champions: India Blue (3rd title)
- Runners-up: India Red
- Participants: 3
- Matches: 4
- Most runs: Smriti Mandhana (187)
- Most wickets: Rajeshwari Gayakwad (8)

The 2013–14 Senior Women's Challenger Trophy was the fifth edition of India's 50 over Women's Challenger Trophy. Three teams made up of the best players in India competed in a round-robin group, with the top two advancing to the final. All matches were held at the JSCA International Stadium Complex, Ranchi across four days in January 2014. The tournament was won by India Blue, who beat India Red in the final by 8 wickets.

== Competition format ==
The three teams played in a round-robin group, playing each other team once, with the top two advancing to the final. Matches were played using a 50 over format.

The group worked on a points system with positions with the group being based on the total points. Points were awarded as follows:

Win: 4 points.
Tie: 2 points.
Loss: 0 points.
No Result/Abandoned: 2 points.

If points in the final table are equal, teams are separated by their Net Run Rate.

== Squads ==
India Blue	India Green (Note: India Green were an Under-19s team, and therefore also referred to as India Under-19s)	India Red
Mithali Raj (c); Prabhakaran Anusha; Ekta Bisht; Annapurna Das; Rajeshwari Gayakwad; Shweta Jadhav; Karu Jain (wk); Mansi Joshi; Veda Krishnamurthy; Nagarajan Niranjana; Punam Raut; Shubhlakshmi Sharma; Sravanthi Naidu; Poonam Yadav	Smriti Mandhana (c); Ritu Dhrub; Rameshwari Gayakwad; Dayalan Hemalatha; Saiqa Ishaque; Ravi Kalpana (wk); Rajni Lodhi; Mukta Magre; Sneha Morey; Lakhmi Nethra; Sushree Dibyadarshini; Swagatika Rath; Deepti Sharma; Sneha Deepthi; Devika Vaidya	Harmanpreet Kaur (c); Preeti Bose; Anagha Deshpande (wk); Jhulan Goswami; Meghna Singh; Madhuri Mehta; Shikha Pandey; Sneh Rana; Priyanka Roy; Amita Sharma; Gouher Sultana; Vellaswamy Vanitha; Sushma Verma (wk)

== Standings ==
Team	Pld	W	L	T	NR	Pts	NRR
India Red (Q)	2	2	0	0	0	8	+0.650
India Blue (Q)	2	1	1	0	0	4	+0.540
India Green	2	0	2	0	0	0	–1.190

Source: CricketArchive

== Group stage ==
Match 1
7 January 2014
Scorecard

India Red; 158 (49.1 overs)	v	India Blue; 149/6 (50 overs)
Amita Sharma 52 (75); Rajeshwari Gayakwad 2/15 (8 overs)		Karu Jain 52 (99); Preeti Bose 2/21 (10 overs)

India Red won by 9 runs
JSCA International Stadium Complex, Ranchi
Umpires: Sanjay Singh and Vinod Seshan

- India Blue won the toss and elected to field.
- Points: India Red 4, India Blue 0.

Match 2
8 January 2014
Scorecard

India Red; 215/8 (50 overs)	v	India Green; 159/9 (50 overs)
Harmanpreet Kaur 99 (101); Saiqa Ishaque 2/21 (10 overs)		Smriti Mandhana 91 (149); Sneh Rana 6/33 (12 overs)

India Red won by 56 runs
JSCA International Stadium Complex, Ranchi
Umpires: Sanjay Singh and Vinod Seshan

- India Red won the toss and elected to bat.
- Points: India Red 4, India Green 0.

Match 3
9 January 2014
Scorecard

India Blue; 233/6 (50 overs)	v	India Green; 170/6 (50 overs)
Mithali Raj 86 (116); Ranji Lodhi 2/35 (5 overs)		Smriti Mandhana 96* (124); Rajeshwari Gayakwad 4/20 (11 overs)

India Red won by 63 runs
JSCA International Stadium Complex, Ranchi
Umpires: Sanjay Singh and Vinod Seshan

- India Blue won the toss and elected to bat.
- Points: India Blue 4, India Green 0.

== Final ==
10 January 2014
Scorecard

India Red; 183/5 (50 overs)	v	India Blue; 186/2 (46.2 overs)
Vellaswamy Vanitha 64* (88); Rajeshwari Gayakwad 2/38 (10 overs)		Punam Raut 63* (88); Priyanka Roy 1/21 (4 overs)

India Blue won by 8 wickets
JSCA International Stadium Complex, Ranchi
Umpires: Sanjay Singh and Vinod Seshan

- India Blue won the toss and elected to field.

== Statistics ==
=== Most runs ===
Player	Team	Matches	Innings	Runs	Average	HS	100s	50s
Smriti Mandhana	India Green	2	2	187	187.00	96*	0	2
Mithali Raj	India Blue	3	3	186	186.00	86	0	2
Harmanpreet Kaur	India Red	3	3	126	42.00	99	0	1
Vellaswamy Vanitha	India Red	3	3	87	43.50	64*	0	1
Karu Jain	India Blue	3	3	81	27.00	52	0	1

Source: CricketArchive

=== Most wickets ===
Player	Team	Overs	Wickets	Average	BBI	5w
Rajeshwari Gayakwad	India Blue	29.0	8	9.12	4/20	0
Sneh Rana	India Red	32.0	7	16.28	6/33	1
Saiqa Ishaque	India Green	22.0	4	15.25	2/21	0
Ekta Bisht	India Blue	30.0	4	25.75	2/39	0
Ritu Dhrub	India Green	22.0	3	25.00	2/45	0

Source: CricketArchive
