= 2015 Senior Women's Challenger Trophy =

- Dates: 14 – 17 June 2015
- Administrator(s): BCCI
- Cricket format: 50 over
- Tournament format(s): Round-robin and final
- Champions: India Blue (4th title)
- Runners-up: India Red
- Participants: 3
- Matches: 4

The 2015 Senior Women's Challenger Trophy was the sixth edition of the women's List-A tournament in India. It was played from 14 June to 17 June. It was played in a round robin format, with a final between the top two teams. India Blue beat India Red in the final by 18 runs.

== Squads ==
India Blue	India Red	India Green
Harmanpreet Kaur (c); Ekta Bisht; Preeti Bose; Thirush Kamini; Sarika Koli; Veda Krishnamurthy; Niranjana Nagarajan; Anuja Patil; Kavita Patil; Krishnappa Rakshita; Paramita Roy; Ananya Upendran; Sushma Verma (wk)	Smriti Mandhana (c); Madhusmita Behera; Rajeshwari Gayakwad; Ravi Kalpana (wk); Latika Kumari; Sneha Morey; Shikha Pandey; Snehal Pradhan; Sneh Rana; Punam Raut; Shubhlakshmi Sharma; Meghna Singh; Poonam Yadav	Devika Vaidya (c); Taniya Bhatia (wk); Sushree Dibyadarshini; Gnanananda Divya; Tejal Hasabnis; Saiqa Ishaque; Pushpa Kiresur; Priya Punia; Doli Ramya; Jemimah Rodrigues; Deepti Sharma; Ekta Singh; Pooja Vastrakar

Source: BCCI

== Standings ==
Team	Pld	W	L	T	NR	Pts	NRR
India Red (Q)	2	2	0	0	0	8	+0.806
India Blue (Q)	2	1	1	0	0	4	+0.220
India Green	2	0	2	0	0	0	–1.149

Source: CricketArchive

== Group stage ==
14 June 2015
Scorecard

India Red; 142/9 (50 overs)	v	India Blue; 117 (41.4 overs)
Poonam Yadav 30* (73); Niranjana Nagarajan 3/20 (9 overs)		Thirush Kamini 66 (118); Shubhlakshmi Sharma 4/30 (6 overs)

India Red won by 25 runs
Srikantadatta Narasimha Raja Wadeyar Ground, Mysore
Umpires: Seetharam Prabhu and Puttarangaiah Jayapal

- India Red won the toss and elected to bat.

15 June 2015
Scorecard

India Blue; 201/7 (50 overs)	v	India Green; 154/9 (50 overs)
Harmanpreet Kaur 63 (94); Sushree Dibyadarshini 2/23 (7 overs)		Taniya Bhatia 67 (101); Preeti Bose 4/23 (10 overs)

India Blue won by 47 runs
Srikantadatta Narasimha Raja Wadeyar Ground, Mysore
Umpires: Belur Ravi and Puttarangaiah Jayapal

- India Blue won the toss and elected to bat.

16 June 2015
Scorecard

India Green; 125 (47.2 overs)	v	India Red; 119/2 (31 overs)
Taniya Bhatia 17 (41); Rajeshwari Gayakwad 4/25 (10 overs)		Poonam Raut 60* (87); Deepti Sharma 1/16 (5 overs); Sushree Dibyadarshini 1/16 (5 overs)

India Red won by 8 wickets (VJD method)
Srikantadatta Narasimha Raja Wadeyar Ground, Mysore
Umpires: Seetharam Prabhu and Belur Ravi

- India Green won the toss and elected to bat.
- Rain stopped play when India Red were 102/2; 4 overs were lost.

== Final ==
17 June 2015
Scorecard

India Blue; 180 (49.5 overs)	v	India Red; 162 (48.1 overs)
Harmanpreet Kaur 47 (69); Snehal Pradhan 2/27 (8 overs)		Smriti Mandhana 52 (88); Preeti Bose 5/43 (10 overs)

India Blue won by 18 runs
Srikantadatta Narasimha Raja Wadeyar Ground, Mysore
Umpires: Belur Ravi and Puttarangaiah Jayapal

- India Red won the toss and elected to field.
