= 2017–18 Senior Women's Challenger Trophy =

Sporting event

- Dates: 4 January 2018 – 8 January 2018
- Administrator(s): BCCI
- Cricket format: 50 over
- Tournament format(s): Round-robin and final
- Champions: India Blue (5th title)
- Runners-up: India Green
- Participants: 3
- Matches: 4
- Most runs: Punam Raut (273) (India Green)
- Most wickets: Anuja Patil (7) (India Green)

The 2017–18 Senior Women's Challenger Trophy was the eighth edition of the women's List-A tournament in India. It was played from 4 January to 8 January 2018. It was played in a round-robin format, with a final between the top two teams. India Blue won the tournament, their fifth, beating India Green in the final.

== Squads ==
India Blue	India Green	India Red
Smriti Mandhana (c); Taniya Bhatia (wk); Neena Choudhary; Rajeshwari Gayakwad; Jhulan Goswami; Dayalan Hemalatha; Mona Meshram; Challuru Prathyusha; Tanusree Sarkar; Vellaswamy Vanitha; Pooja Vastrakar; Radha Yadav; Soni Yadav	Anuja Patil (c); Sobhana Asha; Ekta Bisht; Preeti Bose; Monika Das; Adila Khanam; Shannti Kumari; Shikha Pandey; Nuzhat Parween (wk); Punam Raut; Jemimah Rodrigues; Meghna Singh; Devika Vaidya	Mithali Raj (c); Nishu Choudhary; Manali Dakshini; Bharti Fulmali; Mansi Joshi; Tanuja Kanwar; Sukanya Parida; Priyanka Priyadarshini; Priya Punia; Deepti Sharma; Neha Tanwar; Sushma Verma (wk); Poonam Yadav

== Standings ==
Position	Team	Matches	Won	Lost	NR	Pts	NRR
1	India Green	2	2	0	0	8	+0.737
2	India Blue	2	1	1	0	4	-0.192
3	India Red	2	0	2	0	0	-0.557

The top two teams qualified for the final.

== Group stage ==
Source: BCCI

Match 1
4 January 2018
09:00 IST (03:30 GMT)
Scorecard

India Red; 199 (49.5 overs)	v	India Blue; 200/2(46.1 overs)
Mithali Raj 72 (92); Rajeshwari Gayakwad 2/23 (10 overs)		Smriti Mandhana 100* (123); Poonam Yadav 1/27 (9.1 overs)

India Blue won by 8 wickets
Holkar Stadium, Indore
Umpires: Belur Ravi and Vinod Seshan

- India Blue won the toss and elected to field.

Match 2
5 January 2018
09:00 IST (03:30 GMT)
Scorecard

India Green; 217/6 (50 overs)	v	India Red; 219/2 (42.4 overs)
Deepti Sharma 76 (113); Anuja Patil 2/42 (10 overs)		Punam Raut 84* (124); Deepti Sharma 2/47 (9.4 overs)

India Green won by 8 wickets
Holkar Stadium, Indore
Umpires: Vinod Seshan and Krishnamachari Bharatan

- India Green won the toss and elected to field.

Match 3
6 January 2018
09:00 IST (03:30 GMT)
Scorecard

India Blue; 232/8 (50 overs)	v	India Green; 196/7 (50 overs)
Punam Raut 101 (125); Radha Yadav 3/39 (10 overs)		Mona Meshram 56 (68); Anuja Patil 2/37 (10 overs)

India Green won by 36 runs
Holkar Stadium, Indore
Umpires: Krishnamachari Bharatan and Belur Ravi

- India Blue won the toss and elected to field.

== Final ==
8 January 2018
09:00 IST (03:30 GMT)
Scorecard

India Blue; 207/9 (50 overs)	v	India Green; 174 (45.2 overs)
Mona Meshram 63 (90); Sorhana Asha 3/29 (10 overs)		Punam Raut 88 (120); Challuru Prathyusha 4/23 (6.2 overs)

India Blue won by 33 runs
Holkar Stadium, Indore
Umpires: Belur Ravi and Vinod Seshan
Player of the match: Mona Meshram (Blue)

- India Blue won the toss and elected to bat.

== Statistics ==
=== Most runs ===
Player	Team	Mat	Inns	Runs	Ave	SR	HS	100	50
Punam Raut	India Green	3	3	273	136.50	73.98	101*	1	2
Smriti Mandhana	India Blue	3	3	195	97.50	79.26	100*	1	1
Jemimah Rodrigues	India Green	3	3	179	59.67	79.91	84	0	2
Mona Meshram	India Blue	3	3	163	81.50	73.75	63	0	2
Mithali Raj	India Red	2	2	414	60.50	86.42	72	0	1
Last Updated: 8 January 2018

=== Most wickets ===
Player	Team	Mat	Inns	Wkts	Ave	Econ	BBI	SR
Anuja Patil	India Green	3	3	7	17.28	4.03	3/42	25.71
Challuru Prathyusha	India Blue	2	2	5	12.00	3.67	4/23	19.60
Radha Yadav	India Blue	3	3	5	20.80	3.85	3/39	32.40
Rajeshwari Gayakwad	India Blue	3	3	4	24.00	3.31	2/23	43.50
Sobhana Asha	India Green	2	2	3	21.66	3.61	3/29	36.00
Last Updated: 8 January 2018
