= India women's cricket team in England in 2008 =

Indian women's cricket team in England in 2008
	England	India
- Dates: 28 August – 9 September 2008
Captains	Charlotte Edwards	Mithali Raj

One Day International series
- Results: England won the 5-match series 4–0
Most runs	Claire Taylor (125)	Mithali Raj (162)
Most wickets	Holly Colvin (9)	Gouher Sultana (2)
- Player of the series: Katherine Brunt (Eng)

Twenty20 International series
- Results: 1-match series drawn 0–0

The India women's national cricket team toured England in August and September 2008. They played England in 5 One Day Internationals and 1 Twenty20 International. The ODI series was won by England 4–0, whilst the T20I was abandoned due to rain.

== Squads ==
England	India
Charlotte Edwards (c); Lynsey Askew; Caroline Atkins; Katherine Brunt; Holly Colvin; Lydia Greenway; Isa Guha; Jenny Gunn; Laura Marsh; Beth Morgan; Ebony Rainford-Brent; Nicky Shaw; Anya Shrubsole; Sarah Taylor (wk); Claire Taylor	Mithali Raj (c); Neetu David; Rumeli Dhar; Jhulan Goswami; Karu Jain (wk); Hemlata Kala; Sulakshana Naik (wk); Niranjana Nagarajan; Devika Palshikar; Snehal Pradhan; Seema Pujare; Asha Rawat; Priyanka Roy; Amita Sharma; Jaya Sharma; Gouher Sultana

== Tour matches ==
=== 50-over match: Marylebone Cricket Club v India ===
28 August 2008
Scorecard

India; 227/6 (50 overs)	v	Marylebone Cricket Club; 121 (39.3 overs)
Mithali Raj 69 (90); Lynsey Askew 2/29 (10 overs)		Beth Morgan 33 (43); Gouher Sultana 3/17 (7 overs)

India Women won by 106 runs
Bath Cricket Club Ground, Bath
Umpires: Ian Wright (Eng) and John Holder (Eng)

- India Women won the toss and elected to bat.

== WODI Series ==
=== 1st ODI ===
30 August 2008
Scorecard

India; 124 (43.4 overs)	v	England; 125/2 (36 overs)
Mithali Raj 44 (75); Jenny Gunn 3/13 (8 overs)		Caroline Atkins 45 (96); Niranjana Nagarajan 1/10 (4 overs)

England Women won by 8 wickets
Bath Cricket Club Ground, Bath
Umpires: John Holder (Eng) and Neil Mallender (Eng)
Player of the match: Jenny Gunn (Eng)

- India Women won the toss and elected to bat.
- Niranjana Nagarajan (Ind) made her WODI debut.

=== 2nd ODI ===
1 September 2008
Scorecard

India; 102 (45.1 overs)	v	England; 103/0 (24.3 overs)
Mithali Raj 53* (100); Holly Colvin 4/20 (8.1 overs)		Sarah Taylor 75* (77)

England Women won by 10 wickets
County Ground, Taunton
Umpires: Nigel Llong (Eng) and Peter Willey (Eng)
Player of the match: Katherine Brunt (Eng)

- India Women won the toss and elected to bat.

=== 3rd ODI ===
1 September 2008
Scorecard

India; 126/2 (35.2 overs)	v	England; 99/2 (16.4 overs)
Mithali Raj 55* (79); Katherine Brunt 1/10 (8 overs)		Claire Taylor 29 (31); Gouher Sultana 1/11 (2 overs)

England Women won by 8 wickets (D/L)
County Ground, Taunton
Umpires: Ian Gould (Eng) and Rob Bailey (Eng)
Player of the match: Mithali Raj (Ind)

- England Women won the toss and elected to field.
- India Women innings ended at 35.2 overs by rain.
- England Women target was 99 from 21 overs.

=== 4th ODI ===
7 September 2008
Scorecard

India; 90/7 (23 overs)	v	England; 93/3 (22.1 overs)
Sulakshana Naik 28 (50); Holly Colvin 3/17 (5 overs)		Claire Taylor 56* (68); Jhulan Goswami 1/8 (5 overs)

England Women won by 7 wickets
Arundel Castle Cricket Ground, Arundel
Umpires: Peter Hartley (Eng) and Trevor Jesty (Eng)
Player of the match: Claire Taylor (Eng)

- England Women won the toss and elected to field.
- Match reduced to 23 overs per side due to rain.

=== 5th ODI ===
9 September 2008
Scorecard

India; 7/0 (4 overs)	v	England
Jaya Sharma 4* (13)

No result
County Ground, Hove
Umpires: Richard Illingworth (Eng) and Tim Robinson (Eng)

- England Women won the toss and elected to field.
- No further play possible due rain.

== Only T20I ==
5 September 2008
Scorecard

England	v	India

Match Abandoned
County Ground, Taunton
Umpires: Martin Bodenham (Eng) and Terry Urben (Eng)

- No toss.
- No play possible due to rain.
