= 2018–19 Senior Women's Challenger Trophy =

Indian cricket tournament

- Dates: 3 January 2019 – 6 January 2019
- Administrator: BCCI
- Cricket format: 50 over
- Tournament format(s): Round-robin and final
- Host: Mulapadu
- Champions: India Red (3rd title)
- Runners-up: India Blue
- Participants: 3
- Matches: 4
- Most runs: Harleen Deol (119) (India Red)
- Most wickets: Shikha Pandey (8) (India Red)

The 2018–19 Senior Women's Challenger Trophy was the ninth edition of the women's List-A tournament in India. It was played from 3 January to 6 January 2019. The participating teams were India Blue, India Green and India Red. It was played in a round-robin format, with the top two progressing to the final. India Red defeated India Blue by 15 runs in the final to win the Challenger Trophy for the 3rd time.

== Squads ==
| India Blue | India Green | India Red |
|---|---|---|
| Punam Raut (c); Manali Dakshini; Reemalaxmi Ekka; Bharti Fulmali; Mansi Joshi; Tanuja Kanwar; Minnu Mani; Tamanna Nigam; Priya Punia; Tanusree Sarkar; Aditi Sharma; Gongadi Trisha; Sushma Verma (wk) | Mona Meshram (c); Sushree Dibyadarshini; Tejal Hasabnis; Dayalan Hemalatha; Sathyamoorthy Keerthana; Anita Lodhi; Devyani Prasad; Sneh Rana; Arundhati Reddy; Shubhlakshmi Sharma; Renuka Singh; Shafali Verma; Sweta Verma (wk) | Shikha Pandey (c); Jasia Akhtar; Neeragattu Anusha; Vrushali Bhagat; Harleen Deol; Challa Jhansi Lakshmi; Ravi Kalpana (wk); Veda Krishnamurthy; Shannti Kumari; Shivi Pandey; Tarannum Pathan; Radha Yadav; Komal Zanzad |

== Standings ==
| Position | Team | Matches | Won | Lost | NR | Pts | NRR |
|---|---|---|---|---|---|---|---|
| 1 | India Blue | 2 | 2 | 0 | 0 | 8 | +0.514 |
| 2 | India Red | 2 | 1 | 1 | 0 | 4 | −0.049 |
| 3 | India Green | 2 | 0 | 2 | 0 | 0 | −0.534 |

The top two teams qualified for the final.
Last updated: 5 January 2019

== Group stage ==
Match 1
3 January 2019
09:00 IST (03:30 GMT)
Scorecard

| India Red; 129/10 (45 overs) | v | India Blue; 130/9 (45.5 overs) |
| Veda Krishnamurthy 27 (42); Reemalaxmi Ekka 2/26 (7 overs) | | Manali Dakshini 49* (91); Radha Yadav 3/26 (10 overs) |

India Blue won by 1 wicket
Devineni Venkata Ramana Praneetha Ground, Mulapadu
Umpires: Sai Darshan Kumar (Ind) and Puttarangaiah Jayapal (Ind)

- India Red won the toss and elected to bat.

Match 2
4 January 2019
09:00 IST (03:30 GMT)
Scorecard

| India Blue; 149 (44.4 overs) | v | India Green; 150/4 (39.1 overs) |
| Dayalan Hemalatha 35 (46); Manali Dakshini 3/34 (10 overs) | | Bharati Fulmali 45* (62); Dayalan Hemalatha 1/6 (4 overs) |

India Blue won by 6 wickets
Devineni Venkata Ramana Praneetha Ground, Mulapadu
Umpires: Chirra Ravikanthreddy (Ind) and Puttarangaiah Jayapal (Ind)

- India Green won the toss and elected to bat.

Match 3
5 January 2019
09:00 IST (03:30 GMT)
Scorecard

| India Red; 199/9 (50 overs) | v | India Green; 189 (49.3 overs) |
| Harleen Deol 57 (80); Sathyamoorthy Keerthana 3/33 (10 overs) | | Tejal Hasabnis 65 (118); Shikha Pandey 2/32 (9 overs) |

India Red won by 10 runs
Devineni Venkata Ramana Praneetha Ground, Mulapadu
Umpires: Chirra Ravikanthreddy (Ind) and Sai Darshan Kumar (Ind)

- India Green won the toss and elected to field.

== Final ==
6 January 2019
09:00 IST (03:30 GMT)
Scorecard

| India Red; 183 (49.2 overs) | v | India Blue; 168 (47.2 overs) |
| Veda Krishnamurthy 46 (62); Tanusree Sarkar 3/22 (9.2 overs) | | Bharati Fulmali 69 (97); Shikha Pandey 5/33 (10 overs) |

India Red won by 15 runs
Devineni Venkata Ramana Praneetha Ground, Mulapadu
Umpires: Sai Darshan Kumar (Ind) and Puttarangaiah Jayapal (Ind)

- India Blue won the toss and elected to field.

== Statistics ==
=== Most runs ===
| Player | Team | Mat | Inns | Runs | Ave | SR | HS | 100 | 50 |
|---|---|---|---|---|---|---|---|---|---|
| Harleen Deol | India Red | 3 | 3 | 119 | 39.67 | 61.98 | 50 | 0 | 1 |
| Bharati Fulmali | India Blue | 3 | 3 | 114 | 57.00 | 70.81 | 69 | 0 | 1 |
| Veda Krishnamurthy | India Red | 3 | 3 | 108 | 36.00 | 72.00 | 46 | 0 | 0 |
Last updated: 6 January 2019

=== Most wickets ===
| Player | Team | Mat | Inns | Wkts | Ave | Econ | BBI | SR |
|---|---|---|---|---|---|---|---|---|
| Shikha Pandey | India Red | 3 | 3 | 8 | 9.50 | 2.64 | 5/33 | 1 |
| Tanusree Sarkar | India Blue | 3 | 3 | 6 | 11.67 | 2.66 | 3/22 | 0 |
| Tarannum Pathan | India Red | 3 | 3 | 6 | 13.83 | 2.88 | 3/22 | 0 |
Last updated: 6 January 2019
