= India women's cricket team in the West Indies in 2019–20 =

International cricket tour

	West Indies women	India women
- Dates: 1 November – 20 November 2019
Captains	Stafanie Taylor (WODIs); Anisa Mohammed (WT20Is)	Mithali Raj (WODIs); Harmanpreet Kaur (WT20Is) (Note: Smriti Mandhana captained India Women for the fifth WT20I.)

One Day International series
- Results: India women won the 3-match series 2–1
Most runs	Stafanie Taylor (193)	Punam Raut (123)
Most wickets	Anisa Mohammed (5)	Deepti Sharma (5); Poonam Yadav (5)
- Player of the series: Stafanie Taylor (WI)

Twenty20 International series
- Results: India women won the 5-match series 5–0
Most runs	Shemaine Campbelle (59)	Shafali Verma (158)
Most wickets	Hayley Matthews (6)	Deepti Sharma (8)
- Player of the series: Shafali Verma (Ind)

The India women's cricket team played the West Indies women's cricket team in November 2019. The tour consisted of three Women's One Day Internationals (WODIs), which formed part of the 2017–20 ICC Women's Championship, and five Women's Twenty20 International (WT20I) matches. India won the WODI series 2–1. In the WT20I series, India won the first three matches, to take an unassailable lead. India then went on to win the remaining two fixtures, to sweep the series 5–0.

== Squads ==
WODIs		WT20Is	
West Indies	India	West Indies	India
Stafanie Taylor (c); Anisa Mohammed (vc); Aaliyah Alleyne; Shemaine Campbelle; Britney Cooper; Afy Fletcher; Shabika Gajnabi; Sheneta Grimmond; Shawnisha Hector; Chinelle Henry; Caneisha Isaac; Stacy-Ann King; Kyshona Knight; Hayley Matthews; Natasha McLean; Chedean Nation	Mithali Raj (c); Harmanpreet Kaur (vc); Taniya Bhatia (wk); Ekta Bisht; Rajeshwari Gayakwad; Jhulan Goswami; Dayalan Hemalatha; Mansi Joshi; Smriti Mandhana; Shikha Pandey; Priya Punia; Punam Raut; Jemimah Rodrigues; Deepti Sharma; Sushma Verma (wk); Poonam Yadav	~~Stafanie Taylor (c)~~; Anisa Mohammed (c); Aaliyah Alleyne; Shemaine Campbelle; Afy Fletcher; Cherry-Ann Fraser; Shabika Gajnabi; Sheneta Grimmond; Chinelle Henry; Stacy-Ann King; Kyshona Knight; Hayley Matthews; Natasha McLean; Chedean Nation; Shakera Selman	Harmanpreet Kaur (c); Smriti Mandhana (vc); Taniya Bhatia (wk); Harleen Deol; Mansi Joshi; Veda Krishnamurthy; Shikha Pandey; Anuja Patil; Arundhati Reddy; Jemimah Rodrigues; Deepti Sharma; Shafali Verma; Poonam Yadav; Radha Yadav; Pooja Vastrakar

Chinelle Henry was ruled out of the second and third WODIs, due to a concussion, and was replaced by Hayley Matthews in the West Indies squad. Matthews was eligible to play for the West Indies, after serving an eight-match suspension. Ahead of the second WODI match, Caneisha Isaac was added to the West Indies squad, replacing Britney Cooper, after Cooper suffered a bruised shin. Stafanie Taylor was initially named as the captain of the West Indies' WT20I squad. However, she suffered a ligament sprain and was ruled out of the series, with Cherry-Ann Fraser added to the squad. Anisa Mohammed replaced Taylor as captain for the WT20I matches.

== WODI series ==
=== 1st WODI ===
ICC Women's Championship
1 November 2019
13:30 (D/N)
Scorecard

West Indies; 225/7 (50 overs)	v	India; 224 (50 overs)
Stafanie Taylor 94 (91); Shikha Pandey 2/38 (9 overs)		Priya Punia 75 (107); Anisa Mohammed 5/46 (10 overs)

West Indies Women won by 1 run
Sir Vivian Richards Stadium, Antigua
Umpires: Patrick Gustard (WI) and Jacqueline Williams (WI)
Player of the match: Stafanie Taylor (WI)

- West Indies Women won the toss and elected to bat.
- Aaliyah Alleyne and Shawnisha Hector (WI) both made their WODI debuts.
- Points: West Indies Women 2, India Women 0.

=== 2nd WODI ===
ICC Women's Championship
3 November 2019
13:30 (D/N)
Scorecard

India; 191/6 (50 overs)	v	West Indies; 138 (47.2 overs)
Punam Raut 77 (128); Afy Fletcher 2/32 (10 overs)		Shemaine Campbelle 39 (90); Poonam Yadav 2/26 (10 overs)

India Women won by 53 runs
Sir Vivian Richards Stadium, Antigua
Umpires: Zahid Bassarath (WI) and Patrick Gustard (WI)
Player of the match: Punam Raut (Ind)

- India Women won the toss and elected to bat.
- Points: India Women 2, West Indies Women 0.

=== 3rd WODI ===
ICC Women's Championship
6 November 2019
09:30
Scorecard

West Indies; 194 (50 overs)	v	India; 195/4 (42.1 overs)
Stafanie Taylor 79 (112); Poonam Yadav 2/35 (10 overs)		Smriti Mandhana 74 (63); Hayley Matthews 3/27 (8.1 overs)

India Women won by 6 wickets
Sir Vivian Richards Stadium, Antigua
Umpires: Zahid Bassarath (WI) and Jacqueline Williams (WI)
Player of the match: Smriti Mandhana (Ind)

- West Indies Women won the toss and elected to bat.
- Smriti Mandhana (Ind) became the third-fastest cricketer, in terms of innings, to score 2,000 runs in WODIs (51).
- Points: India Women 2, West Indies Women 0.

== WT20I series ==
=== 1st WT20I ===
9 November 2019
18:00 (N)
Scorecard

India; 185/4 (20 overs)	v	West Indies; 101/9 (20 overs)
Shafali Verma 73 (49); Anisa Mohammed 2/35 (4 overs)		Shemaine Campbelle 33 (34); Radha Yadav 2/10 (4 overs)

India Women won by 84 runs
Daren Sammy Cricket Ground, Gros Islet
Umpires: Zahid Bassarath (WI) and Jacqueline Williams (WI)
Player of the match: Shafali Verma (Ind)

- West Indies Women won the toss and elected to field.
- Aaliyah Alleyne (WI) made her WT20I debut.
- Shafali Verma and Smriti Mandhana made the highest partnership for any wicket for India in WT20Is with 143 runs.

=== 2nd WT20I ===
10 November 2019
13:30
Scorecard

West Indies; 103/7 (20 overs)	v	India; 104/0 (10.3 overs)
Chedean Nation 32 (36); Deepti Sharma 4/10 (4 overs)		Shafali Verma 69* (35)

India Women won by 10 wickets
Daren Sammy Cricket Ground, Gros Islet
Umpires: Patrick Gustard (WI) and Jacqueline Williams (WI)
Player of the match: Deepti Sharma (Ind)

- West Indies Women won the toss and elected to bat.

=== 3rd WT20I ===
14 November 2019
18:00 (N)
Scorecard

West Indies; 59/9 (20 overs)	v	India; 60/3 (16.4 overs)
Chinelle Henry 11 (18); Radha Yadav 2/6 (4 overs)		Jemimah Rodrigues 40* (51); Hayley Matthews 2/7 (4 overs)

India Women won by 7 wickets
Providence Stadium, Providence, Guyana
Umpires: Zahid Bassarath (WI) and Patrick Gustard (WI)
Player of the match: Jemimah Rodrigues (Ind)

- West Indies Women won the toss and elected to bat.

=== 4th WT20I ===
17 November 2019
13:30
Scorecard

India; 50/7 (9 overs)	v	West Indies; 45/5 (9 overs)
Pooja Vastrakar 10 (8); Hayley Matthews 3/13 (2 overs)		Hayley Matthews 11 (14); Anuja Patil 2/8 (2 overs)

India Women won by 5 runs
Providence Stadium, Providence, Guyana
Umpires: Zahid Bassarath (WI) and Jacqueline Williams (WI)
Player of the match: Hayley Matthews (WI)

- West Indies Women won the toss and elected to field.
- The match was reduced to 9 overs per side due to rain.

=== 5th WT20I ===
20 November 2019
18:00 (N)
Scorecard

India; 134/3 (20 overs)	v	West Indies; 73/7 (20 overs)
Veda Krishnamurthy 57* (48); Hayley Matthews1/23 (4 overs); Aaliyah Alleyne 1/23 (4 overs)		Kyshona Knight 22 (39); Anuja Patil 2/3 (3 overs)

India Women won by 61 runs
Providence Stadium, Providence, Guyana
Umpires: Patrick Gustard (WI) and Jacqueline Williams (WI)
Player of the match: Veda Krishnamurthy (WI)

- India Women won the toss and elected to bat.
- Anuja Patil (Ind) played in her 50th WT20I.
