= India Green women's cricket team =

Indian women's cricket team

India Green
Personnel
- Captain: Mona Meshram (50 over); Veda Krishnamurthy (20 over)

Team information
- Founded: 2008

History
- WCT wins: 1
- WT20CT wins: 1

The India Green women's cricket team, previously known as India B and India Under-19s, are an Indian women's cricket team that compete in the Senior Women's Challenger Trophy and the Senior Women's T20 Challenger Trophy. The team has no geographical base, instead being made up of some of the best players from across India. Between the 2012–13 and 2016–17 seasons, the team functioned as an Under-19 team. They have won the 50 over Challenger Trophy and the T20 Challenger Trophy once apiece, in 2008–09 and 2009–10, respectively.

== History ==
India Green were first formed in 2008, as India B, to compete in the 50 over Senior Women's Challenger Trophy, which involved three teams made up of the best players in India. In their first season, the side, captained by Amita Sharma, won the competition, beating India A in the final by six wickets. The following season, the side was renamed India Green and competed in the 2009–10 Senior Women's T20 Challenger Trophy, and again emerged triumphant, beating India Blue in the final.

Returning to the 50 over format in 2010–11, the side again reached the final but lost out this time to India Blue, by 7 wickets. The following season, 2011–12, India Green finished bottom of the group with no victories.

Ahead of the 2012–13 season, India Green were made into a side exclusively for Under-19 players, captained by Nidhi Torvi. The side remained as an Under-19 side until the 2016–17, but were unsuccessful in this guise, losing every match during the period.

After returning to equal status with the other teams ahead of the 2017–18 season, captained by Anuja Patil and including India played such as Punam Raut and Ekta Bisht, the side topped the group of the Challenger Trophy before losing in the final to India Blue. The 2018–19 season saw the return of the T20 competition alongside the 50 over competition, with India Green finished bottom of the group in both competitions. In 2019–20, the 50 over Challenger Trophy was cancelled due to the COVID-19 pandemic and the T20 Challenger Trophy was competed with different teams.

== Seasons ==
=== Senior Women's Challenger Trophy ===
Season	League standings								Final standing
Season	P	W	L	T	NR	NRR	Pts	Pos	Final standing
2008–09	2	1	1	0	0	+0.120	2	1st	Champions
2010–11	2	1	1	0	0	–0.461	4	2nd	Lost final
2011–12	2	0	2	0	0	–0.980	0	3rd	
2012–13	2	0	2	0	0	–1.033	0	3rd	
2013–14	2	0	2	0	0	–1.190	0	3rd	
2015	2	0	2	0	0	–1.149	0	3rd	
2016–17	2	0	2	0	0	–0.460	0	3rd	
2017–18	2	2	0	0	0	+0.737	8	1st	Lost final
2018–19	2	0	2	0	0	–0.534	0	3rd	

=== Senior Women's T20 Challenger Trophy ===
Season	League standings								Final standing
Season	P	W	L	T	NR	NRR	Pts	Pos	Final standing
2009–10	2	1	1	0	0	–0.079	4	2nd	Champions
2018–19	4	1	3	0	0	–1.468	4	3rd	

== Honours ==
- Senior Women's Challenger Trophy:
  - Winners (1): 2008–09
- Senior Women's T20 Challenger Trophy:
  - Winners (1): 2009–10
