= South Africa women's cricket team in India in 2019–20 =

International cricket tour

	India women	South Africa women
- Dates: 20 September – 14 October 2019
Captains	Mithali Raj (WODIs); Harmanpreet Kaur (WT20Is)	Suné Luus

One Day International series
- Results: India women won the 3-match series 3–0
Most runs	Punam Raut (96)	Laura Wolvaardt (131)
Most wickets	Ekta Bisht (7)	Ayabonga Khaka (5)
- Player of the series: Marizanne Kapp (SA)

Twenty20 International series
- Results: India women won the 6-match series 3–1
Most runs	Harmanpreet Kaur (94)	Lizelle Lee (125)
Most wickets	Poonam Yadav (7); Radha Yadav (7)	Nadine de Klerk (8)
- Player of the series: Deepti Sharma (Ind)

The South Africa women's cricket team toured India to play against the India women's cricket team in September and October 2019. The tour consisted of three Women's One Day Internationals (WODIs) and six Women's Twenty20 International (WT20I) matches. The WODI matches were not part of the 2017–20 ICC Women's Championship.

Ahead of the tour, India's Mithali Raj retired from WT20I cricket, to focus on the 50-over format in the run-up to the 2021 Women's Cricket World Cup. South Africa's captain, Dane van Niekerk, missed the series due to injury, with Suné Luus leading the team in her absence.

India had initially won the WT20I series, after a win in the fourth match gave them an unassailable lead. India had also won the first match, with the next two fixtures abandoned due to rain. However, on 2 October 2019, an extra WT20I match was added to the schedule. India won the fifth WT20I match by five wickets, to confirm their series victory. South Africa won the sixth and final WT20I match by 105 runs, with India winning the series 3–1.

In the WODI series, India won the first two matches to take an unassailable lead. India also won the final WODI match, by six runs, winning the series 3–0.

== Squads ==
WODIs		WT20Is	
India	South Africa	India	South Africa
Mithali Raj (c); Harmanpreet Kaur (vc); Taniya Bhatia (wk); Ekta Bisht; Rajeshwari Gayakwad; Jhulan Goswami; Dayalan Hemalatha; Mansi Joshi; ~~Smriti Mandhana~~; Shikha Pandey; Priya Punia; Punam Raut; Jemimah Rodrigues; Deepti Sharma; Pooja Vastrakar; Poonam Yadav	Suné Luus (c); Tazmin Brits; Trisha Chetty; Nadine de Klerk; Mignon du Preez; Lara Goodall; Shabnim Ismail; Marizanne Kapp; Ayabonga Khaka; Lizelle Lee; Nonkululeko Mlaba; Tumi Sekhukhune; Nondumiso Shangase; Laura Wolvaardt	Harmanpreet Kaur (c); Smriti Mandhana (vc); Taniya Bhatia (wk); Harleen Deol; Mansi Joshi; Veda Krishnamurthy; Shikha Pandey; Anuja Patil; Arundhati Reddy; Jemimah Rodrigues; Deepti Sharma; Pooja Vastrakar; Shafali Verma; Poonam Yadav; Radha Yadav	Suné Luus (c); Anneke Bosch; Tazmin Brits; Trisha Chetty; Nadine de Klerk; Mignon du Preez; Lara Goodall; Shabnim Ismail; Sinalo Jafta; Marizanne Kapp; Ayabonga Khaka; Lizelle Lee; Nonkululeko Mlaba; Tumi Sekhukhune; Nondumiso Shangase; Laura Wolvaardt

Ahead of the WODI series, Smriti Mandhana was ruled out of India's squad with a fractured toe. She was replaced by Pooja Vastrakar.

== Tour matches ==
=== 20-over match: Indian Board President's Women XI v South Africa Women ===
20 September 2019
10:00
Scorecard

Indian Board President's Women XI	v	South Africa

Match abandoned
Lalabhai Contractor Stadium, Surat
Umpires: Jayaraman Madanagopal (Ind) and Chirra Ravikanthreddy (Ind)

- No toss.
- No play was possible due to a wet outfield.

=== 20-over match: Indian Board President's Women XI v South Africa Women ===
22 September 2019
14:30
Scorecard

South Africa; 174/5 (20 overs)	v	Indian Board President's Women XI; 91 (20 overs)
Lizelle Lee 65 (48); Tarannum Pathan 2/23 (4 overs)		Bharti Fulmali 23 (14); Shabnim Ismail 3/11 (4 overs)

South Africa Women won by 83 runs
Lalabhai Contractor Stadium, Surat
Umpires: Jayaraman Madanagopal (Ind) and Chirra Ravikanthreddy (Ind)

- South Africa Women won the toss and elected to bat.

== WT20I series ==
=== 1st WT20I ===
24 September 2019
19:00 (N)
Scorecard

India; 130/8 (20 overs)	v	South Africa; 119 (19.5 overs)
Harmanpreet Kaur 43 (34); Shabnim Ismail 3/26 (4 overs)		Mignon du Preez 59 (43); Deepti Sharma 3/8 (4 overs)

India Women won by 11 runs
Lalabhai Contractor Stadium, Surat
Umpires: Jayaraman Madanagopal (Ind) and Chirra Ravikanthreddy (Ind)
Player of the match: Deepti Sharma (Ind)

- South Africa Women won the toss and elected to field.
- Shafali Verma (Ind) and Nonkululeko Mlaba (SA) both made their WT20I debuts.

=== 2nd WT20I ===
26 September 2019
19:00 (N)
Scorecard

India	v	South Africa

Match abandoned
Lalabhai Contractor Stadium, Surat
Umpires: Jayaraman Madanagopal (Ind) and Chirra Ravikanthreddy (Ind)

- No toss.
- No play was possible due to rain.

=== 3rd WT20I ===
29 September 2019
19:00 (N)
Scorecard

India	v	South Africa

Match abandoned
Lalabhai Contractor Stadium, Surat
Umpires: Yeshwant Barde (Ind) and Jayaraman Madanagopal (Ind)

- No toss.
- No play was possible due to rain.

=== 4th WT20I ===
1 October 2019
19:00 (N)
Scorecard

India; 140/4 (17 overs)	v	South Africa; 89/7 (17 overs)
Shafali Verma 46 (33); Nadine de Klerk 2/24 (3 overs)		Laura Wolvaardt 23 (24); Poonam Yadav 3/13 (3 overs)

India Women won by 51 runs
Lalabhai Contractor Stadium, Surat
Umpires: Yeshwant Barde (Ind) and Chirra Ravikanthreddy (Ind)
Player of the match: Poonam Yadav (Ind)

- South Africa Women won the toss and elected to field.
- The match was reduced to 17 overs per side due to a wet outfield.

=== 5th WT20I ===
3 October 2019
19:00 (N)
Scorecard

South Africa; 98/8 (20 overs)	v	India; 99/5 (17.1 overs)
Laura Wolvaardt 17 (20); Radha Yadav 3/23 (4 overs)		Harmanpreet Kaur 34* (32); Shabnim Ismail 2/19 (4 overs)

India Women won by 5 wickets
Lalabhai Contractor Stadium, Surat
Umpires: Yeshwant Barde (Ind) and Jayaraman Madanagopal (Ind)
Player of the match: Harmanpreet Kaur (Ind)

- India Women won the toss and elected to field.
- Anneke Bosch (SA) made her WT20I debut.

=== 6th WT20I ===
4 October 2019
19:00 (N)
Scorecard

South Africa; 175/3 (20 overs)	v	India; 70 (17.3 overs)
Lizelle Lee 84 (47); Harmanpreet Kaur 1/5 (1 over)		Veda Krishnamurthy 26 (24); Nadine de Klerk 3/18 (4 overs)

South Africa Women won by 105 runs
Lalabhai Contractor Stadium, Surat
Umpires: Yeshwant Barde (Ind) and Chirra Ravikanthreddy (Ind)
Player of the match: Lizelle Lee (SA)

- South Africa Women won the toss and elected to bat.
- Harmanpreet Kaur became the first cricketer for India, male or female, to play in 100 international Twenty20 matches.
- This was India's biggest defeat, in terms of runs, in WT20Is.

== WODI series ==
=== 1st WODI ===
9 October 2019
09:00
Scorecard

South Africa; 164 (45.1 overs)	v	India; 165/2 (41.4 overs)
Marizanne Kapp 54 (64); Jhulan Goswami 3/33 (7.1 overs)		Priya Punia* 75 (124); Nadine de Klerk 1/29 (7.4 overs)

India Women won by 8 wickets
Reliance Stadium, Vadodara
Umpires: Saiyed Khalid (Ind) and Sadashiv Iyer (Ind)
Player of the match: Priya Punia (Ind)

- South Africa Women won the toss and elected to bat
- Priya Punia (Ind) and Nondumiso Shangase (SA) both made their WODI debuts.

=== 2nd WODI ===
11 October 2019
09:00
Scorecard

South Africa; 247/6 (50 overs)	v	India; 248/5 (48 overs)
Laura Wolvaardt 69 (98); Shikha Pandey 2/38 (8 overs)		Mithali Raj 66 (82); Ayabonga Khaka 3/69 (10 overs)

India Women won by 5 wickets
Reliance Stadium, Vadodara
Umpires: Sadashiv Iyer (Ind) and Saiyed Khalid (Ind)
Player of the match: Punam Raut (Ind)

- India Women won the toss and elected to field.
- This was India Women's highest successful run chase in WODIs.

=== 3rd WODI ===
14 October 2019
09:00
Scorecard

India; 146 (45.5 overs)	v	South Africa; 140 (48 overs)
Harmanpreet Kaur 38 (76); Marizanne Kapp 3/20 (9 overs)		Marizanne Kapp 29 (43); Ekta Bisht 3/32 (10 overs)

India Women won by 6 runs
Reliance Stadium, Vadodara
Umpires: Sadashiv Iyer (Ind) and Saiyed Khalid (Ind)
Player of the match: Ekta Bisht (Ind)

- India Women won the toss and elected to bat.
