= Senior Women's Challenger Trophy =

- Countries: India
- Administrator: BCCI
- Format: 50 over
- First edition: 2008–09
- Latest edition: 2021–22
- Next edition: 2024–25
- Tournament format: Round-robin and Finals
- Number of teams: 4
- Current champion: India A (1st title)
- Most successful: India Blue (5 titles)
- TV: Star Sports
- Website: www.bcci.tv

The Senior Women's Challenger Trophy was an Indian women's one-day cricket tournament. It was the women's version of NKP Salve Challenger Trophy. Established in the 2008–09 season, it was played with the purpose of showcasing the talent that the country has, as well as providing opportunities for younger players to make an impression. India Blue have won the tournament five times. The current champions are India A, who won the 2021–22 edition.

== Teams ==
India A, India B and India Senior were the three teams that battled it out in the inaugural edition of the Challenger Trophy, in 2008–09 season. The following year the teams were renamed to India Blue, India Green and India Red. Between the 2012–13 season and the 2016–17 season, India Green were exclusively an Under-19 team. For the 2021–22 tournament, four teams competed, named India A, India B, India C and India D.

== Tournament results ==
Season	Final			Final venue	Ref
Season	Winner	Result	Runner-up	Final venue	Ref
2008–09	India B 123/4 (32.5 overs)	India B won by 6 wickets Scorecard	India A 122 (48.1 overs)	Sardar Patel Stadium, Ahmedabad	
2010–11	India Blue; 193/3 (47.4 overs)	India Blue won by 7 wickets Scorecard	India Green; 7/192/4 (50 overs)	Dr. Y. S. Rajasekhara Reddy ACA–VDCA Cricket Stadium, Visakhapatnam	
2011–12	India Red; 179/8 (50 overs)	India Red won by 41 runs Scorecard	India Blue; 138 (43.1 overs)	Moti Bagh Stadium, Vadodara	
2012–13	India Blue; 225/5 (50 overs)	India Blue won by 60 runs Scorecard	India Red; 165 (48.2 overs)	Bandra Kurla Complex, Mumbai	
2013–14	India Blue; 186/2 (46.2 overs)	India Blue won by 8 wickets Scorecard	India Red; 183/5 (50 overs)	Heavy Engineering Corporation International Cricket Stadium Complex, Ranchi	
2015	India Blue; 180 (49.5 overs)	India Blue won by 18 runs Scorecard	India Red; 162 (48.1 overs)	Srikantadatta Narasimha Raja Wadeyar Ground, Mysore	
2016–17	India Red; 131/3 (30.4 overs)	India Red won by 7 wickets Scorecard	India Blue; 129/9 (50 overs)	Moti Bagh Stadium, Vadodara	
2017–18	India Blue; 207/9 (50 overs)	India Blue won by 33 runs Scorecard	India Green; 174 (45.2 overs)	Holkar Stadium, Indore	
2018–19	India Red; 183 (49.2 overs)	India Red won by 15 runs Scorecard	India Blue; 168 (47.2 overs)	Devineni Venkata Ramana Praneetha Ground, Mulapadu	
2019–20	Cancelled due to the COVID-19 pandemic				
2021–22	India A 224/7 (45.4 overs)	India A won by 3 wickets Scorecard	India D 219/8 (50 overs)	Devineni Venkata Ramana Praneetha Ground, Mulapadu	
