= India Blue women's cricket team =

Indian women's cricket team

India Blue
Personnel
- Captain: Punam Raut (50 over); Mithali Raj (20 over)

Team information
- Founded: 2008

History
- WCT wins: 5
- WT20CT wins: 1

The India Blue women's cricket team, previously known as India A, are an Indian women's cricket team that compete in the Senior Women's Challenger Trophy and the Senior Women's T20 Challenger Trophy. The team has no geographical base, instead being made up of some of the best players from across India. They are the most successful team in the 50 over Challenger Trophy, with 5 title wins, whilst they have won the T20 Challenger Trophy once, in 2018–19.

== History ==
India Blue were first formed in 2008, as India A, to compete in the 50 over Senior Women's Challenger Trophy, which involved three teams made up of the best players in India. In their first season, the side, captained by Rumeli Dhar, reached the final but lost to India B by 6 wickets. The following season, the side was renamed India Blue and competed in the 2009–10 Senior Women's T20 Challenger Trophy, again reaching the final after topping the group stage, but losing out to India Green.

India Blue won their first title in 2010–11, winning the 50 over trophy after topping the group then beating India Green in the final by 7 wickets. After losing in the final in 2011–12, India Blue then won three titles in a row, in 2012–13, 2013–14 and 2015, each time finishing second in their group before beating India Red in the final.

India Blue again reached the final in 2016–17, but lost to India Red, before regaining their title in 2017–18. The 2018–19 season saw the return of the T20 competition alongside the 50 over competition, and India Blue reached the final of both, winning the T20 final but losing the 50 over final. In 2019–20, the 50 over Challenger Trophy was cancelled due to the COVID-19 pandemic and the T20 Challenger Trophy was competed with different teams.

== Seasons ==
=== Senior Women's Challenger Trophy ===
Season	League standings								Final standing
Season	P	W	L	T	NR	NRR	Pts	Pos	Final standing
2008–09	2	1	1	0	0	–0.010	2	2nd	Lost final
2010–11	2	1	0	0	1	+0.860	7	1st	Champions
2011–12	2	2	0	0	0	+1.280	10	1st	Lost final
2012–13	2	1	1	0	0	–1.115	5	2nd	Champions
2013–14	2	1	1	0	0	+0.540	4	2nd	Champions
2015	2	1	1	0	0	+0.220	4	2nd	Champions
2016–17	2	2	0	0	0	+0.240	8	1st	Lost final
2017–18	2	1	1	0	0	–0.192	4	2nd	Champions
2018–19	2	2	0	0	0	+0.514	8	1st	Lost final

=== Senior Women's T20 Challenger Trophy ===
Season	League standings								Final standing
Season	P	W	L	T	NR	NRR	Pts	Pos	Final standing
2009–10	2	1	1	0	0	+0.177	4	1st	Lost final
2018–19	4	2	2	0	0	+0.654	8	2nd	Champions

== Honours ==
- Senior Women's Challenger Trophy:
  - Winners (5): 2010–11, 2012–13, 2013–14, 2015 & 2017–18
- Senior Women's T20 Challenger Trophy:
  - Winners (1): 2018–19
