= 2017 Women's Cricket World Cup final =

Women's Cricket World Cup final

2017 ICC Women's World Cup Final
- Event: 2017 Women's Cricket World Cup
England	India
(England)	(India)
228/7	219
50 overs	48.4 overs
- England won by 9 runs
- Date: 23 July 2017
- Venue: Lord's, London
- Player of the match: Anya Shrubsole (Eng)
- Umpires: Gregory Brathwaite (WI) and Shaun George (SA)

The 2017 ICC Women's World Cup final was a women's One Day International cricket match played between England and India to decide the winner of the 2017 Women's World Cup. England won the game by nine runs to secure their fourth World Cup title, with Anya Shrubsole named player of the match. It was one of the closest finals in tournament history, with only the 2000 final being decided by a narrower margin.

The final was played at Lord's, London, on 23 July 2017. Lord's had been announced as the host on 8 February 2016. The game was sold out, with a near-capacity crowd of around 24,000 in attendance. The bell to signal the start of play was rung by Eileen Ash, who at 105 years old was the oldest surviving international cricketer at the time.

== Background ==
=== Significance ===
England were playing in the Women's World Cup Final for the fifth time, (Note: England have finished in the top two of seven separate World Cups, but at the first two tournaments no final was played.) a mark surpassed only by Australia. However, in the preceding five tournaments (1997–2013), England had made the final just once, defeating New Zealand in the 2009 final to claim their third World Cup title. India on the other hand was playing in the World Cup Final for only the second time in their history. The first had been a loss to Australia in 2005.

=== Route to the final ===
The group stage of the 2017 World Cup consisted of a simple round-robin, with each of the eight teams playing each other once and the top four teams progressing to the semi-finals. In the opening match of the tournament, India unexpectedly defeated England by 35 runs. However, England went on to win all six of their remaining group-stage games, finishing top of the table – with the same number of points as the defending champion Australia but a superior net run rate. India finished third in the group stage, after losses to South Africa (by 115 runs) and Australia (by eight wickets).

In the first semi-final, played on 18 July at Bristol County Ground, England defeated South Africa by two wickets. South Africa batted first, posting a score of 218/6 from their 50 overs. Towards the end of their innings, England required three runs from the final over to win, with Anya Shrubsole hitting the winning runs off Shabnim Ismail with just two balls to spare.

The second semi-final, played at The County Ground, Derby, was reduced to 42 overs per side due to rain. India posted a score of 281/4, with Harmanpreet Kaur scoring 171 (not out) from 115 balls, including seven sixes. This was the highest individual score in the knockout stages of a World Cup, and was widely heralded as one of the greatest ever World Cup innings. In response, Australia was bowled out for 245, leaving India the victors by 36 runs.

== Teams ==
Each team had 15 players in its tournament squad, 11 of whom played in the final. Both teams selected the same line-up for the final as they used in their semi-finals. Only five selected players had previously played in a World Cup final – Mithali Raj and Jhulan Goswami for India, and Katherine Brunt, Laura Marsh, and Sarah Taylor for England.

England	India
Heather Knight (c); Tammy Beaumont; Katherine Brunt; Jenny Gunn; Alex Hartley; Laura Marsh; Nat Sciver; Anya Shrubsole; Sarah Taylor (wk); Fran Wilson; Lauren Winfield-Hill; Georgia Elwiss; Danielle Hazell; Beth Langston; Danielle Wyatt; Coach: Mark Robinson	Mithali Raj (c); Rajeshwari Gayakwad; Jhulan Goswami; Harmanpreet Kaur; Veda Krishnamurthy; Smriti Mandhana; Shikha Pandey; Punam Raut; Deepti Sharma; Sushma Verma (wk); Poonam Yadav; Ekta Bisht; Mansi Joshi; Mona Meshram; Nuzhat Parween; Coach: Tushar Arothe

== Match ==
=== Match officials ===
- On-field umpires: Gregory Brathwaite (WI) and Shaun George (SA)
- TV umpire: Paul Wilson (Aus)
- Reserve umpire: Ahsan Raza (Pak)
- Match referee: Steve Bernard (Aus)

=== Match details ===
23 July 2017
10:30
Scorecard

England; 228/7 (50 overs)	v	India; 219 (48.4 overs)
Natalie Sciver 51 (68 balls); Jhulan Goswami 3/23 (10 overs)		Punam Raut 86 (115 balls); Anya Shrubsole 6/46 (9.4 overs)

England won by 9 runs
Lord's, London
Umpires: Gregory Brathwaite (WI) and Shaun George (SA)
Player of the match: Anya Shrubsole (Eng)

- England won the toss and elected to bat.

=== England innings ===
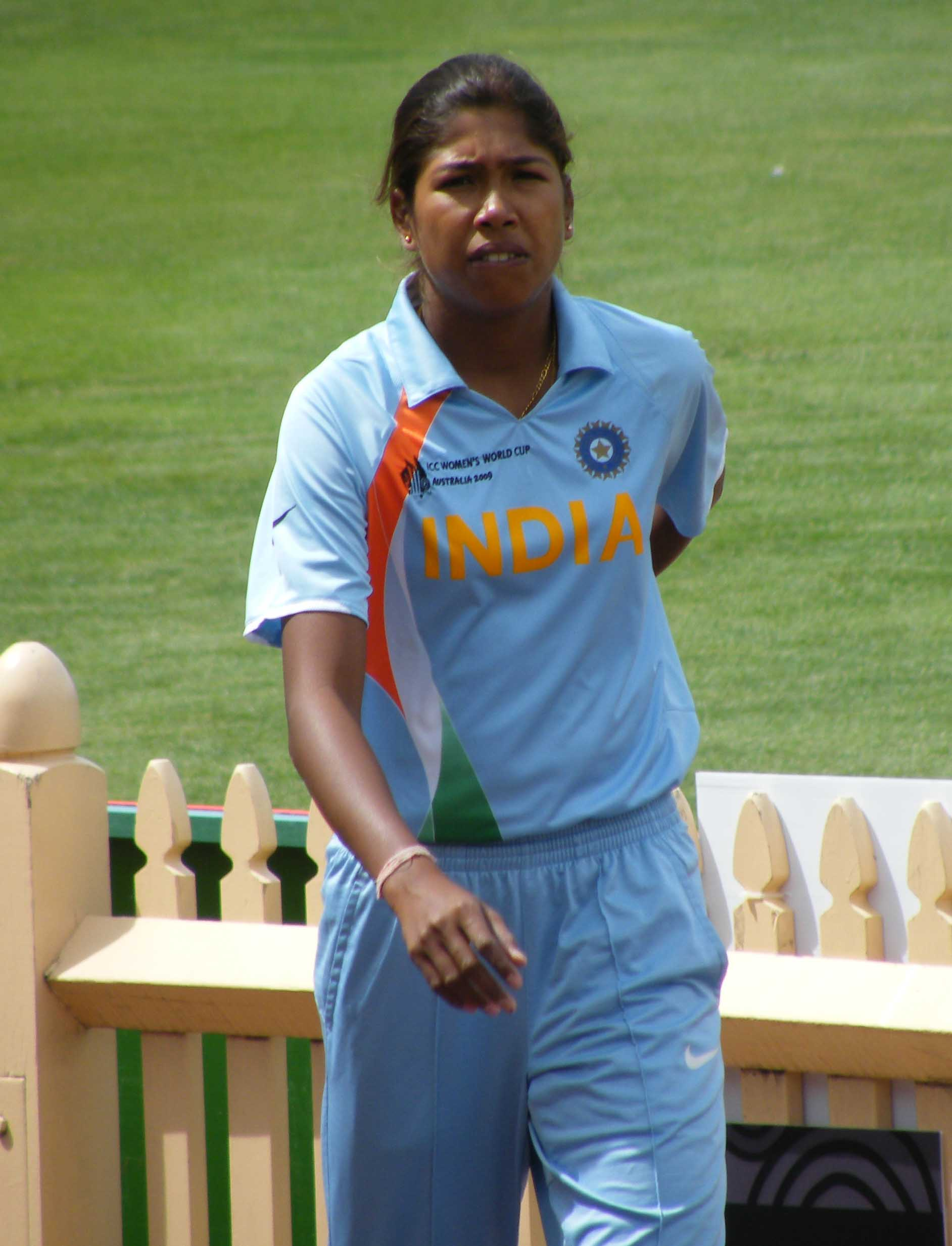
Jhulan Goswami was India's best bowler, finishing with 3/23 from 10 overs.

England's captain Heather Knight won the toss and elected to bat. Their openers, Lauren Winfield (24 runs) and Tammy Beaumont (23), made steady progress, putting on 47 runs before Winfield was bowled by Rajeshwari Gayakwad. Beaumont was out three overs later, caught in the deep off the bowling of Poonam Yadav. This brought Heather Knight (1) to the crease, but she lasted just seven balls before also being dismissed by Yadav, leg before wicket (lbw; via DRS). Sarah Taylor (45) and Natalie Sciver (51) steadied the ship somewhat, putting on 83 runs for the fourth wicket whilst light rain fell. With the score at 146, Taylor was caught behind from the bowling of Jhulan Goswami. Goswami then had Fran Wilson out next ball, for a golden duck. Sciver also fell to Goswami a few overs later, unsuccessfully challenging an lbw decision. Katherine Brunt (34) and Jenny Gunn (25 not out) put on 32 runs for the seventh wicket before Brunt was run out by Goswami with a direct hit. Gunn continued on with Laura Marsh (14 not out) for the last four overs, with England finishing on 228/7 from their 50 overs. Jhulan Goswami was the pick of the Indian bowlers, finished with 3/23.

=== India innings ===
India lost a wicket in their second over, with Smriti Mandhana bowled by Anya Shrubsole for a duck. Punam Raut (86 runs) and Mithali Raj (17) then put on 38 runs before Raj was run out by Natalie Sciver. Raut and Harmanpreet Kaur (51) compiled a 95-run fourth-wicket partnership, lasting just over 20 overs, before Kaur was caught in the deep off the bowling of Alex Hartley. Raut then combined with Veda Krishnamurthy (35) for an additional 53 runs. Shrubsole then dismissed Raut lbw with India at 191 and led a batting collapse, with India losing their final seven wickets for just 28 runs. Hartley bowled Sushma Verma for a duck and Shrubsole claimed the wickets of Krishnamurthy and Jhulan Goswami before Shikha Pandey was run out. As the match reached its climax, India required 11 runs from the last two overs, but they could only add one more run before Shrubsole finished the job by dismissing both Deepti Sharma and Rajeshwari Gayakwad in four balls. Shrubsole – the player of the match – finished with 6/46 from 9.4 overs, the best bowling figures in any World Cup final.

=== Scorecard ===
1st innings

England batting
Player	Status	Runs	Balls	4s	6s	Strike rate
Lauren Winfield-Hill	b Gayakwad	24	35	4	0	68.57
Tammy Beaumont	c Goswami b Yadav	23	37	5	0	62.16
Sarah Taylor	c †Verma b Goswami	45	62	0	0	72.58
Heather Knight	lbw b Yadav	1	7	0	0	14.28
Nat Sciver	lbw b Goswami	51	68	5	0	75.00
Fran Wilson	lbw b Goswami	0	1	0	0	0.00
Katherine Brunt	run out (Deepti)	34	42	2	0	80.95
Jenny Gunn	not out	25	38	1	0	65.78
Laura Marsh	not out	14	11	1	0	127.27
Anya Shrubsole	did not bat					
Alex Hartley	did not bat					
Extras	(lb 3, nb 1, w 7)	11				
Total	(7 wickets; 50 overs)	228		18	0	RR 4.56

Fall of wickets: 1/47 (Winfield, 11.1 ov), 2/60 (Beaumont, 14.3 ov), 3/63 (Knight, 16.1 ov), 4/146 (Taylor, 32.4 ov), 5/146 (Wilson, 32.5 ov), 6/164 (Sciver, 37.1 ov), 7/196 (Brunt, 45.6 ov)

India bowling
Bowler	Overs	Maidens	Runs	Wickets	Econ	Wides	NBs
Jhulan Goswami	10	3	23	3	2.30	1	0
Shikha Pandey	7	0	53	0	7.57	1	1
Rajeshwari Gayakwad	10	1	49	1	4.90	1	0
Deepti Sharma	9	0	39	0	4.33	1	0
Poonam Yadav	10	0	36	2	3.60	0	0
Harmanpreet Kaur	4	0	25	0	6.25	1	0

2nd innings

India batting
Player	Status	Runs	Balls	4s	6s	Strike rate
Punam Raut	lbw b Shrubsole	86	115	4	1	74.78
Smriti Mandhana	b Shrubsole	0	4	0	0	0.00
Mithali Raj	run out (Sciver/†Taylor)	17	31	3	0	54.83
Harmanpreet Kaur	c Beaumont b Hartley	51	80	3	2	63.75
Veda Krishnamurthy	c Sciver b Shrubsole	35	34	5	0	102.94
Sushma Verma	b Hartley	0	2	0	0	0.00
Deepti Sharma	c Sciver b Shrubsole	14	12	1	0	116.66
Jhulan Goswami	b Shrubsole	0	1	0	0	0.00
Shikha Pandey	run out (Shrubsole/†Taylor)	4	8	0	0	50.00
Poonam Yadav	not out	1	5	0	0	20.00
Rajeshwari Gayakwad	b Shrubsole	0	1	0	0	0.00
Extras	(lb 3, nb 1, w 7)	11				
Total	(all out; 48.4 overs)	219		16	3	RR 4.50

Fall of wickets: 1/5 (Mandhana, 1.4 ov), 2/43 (Raj, 12.1 ov), 3/138 (Harmanpreet, 33.3 ov), 4/191 (Raut, 42.5 ov), 5/196 (Verma, 43.3 ov), 6/200 (Krishnamurthy, 44.4 ov), 7/201 (Goswami, 44.6 ov), 8/218 (Pandey, 47.3 ov), 9/218 (Deepti, 48.1 ov), 10/219 (Gayakwad, 48.4 ov)

England bowling
Bowler	Overs	Maidens	Runs	Wickets	Econ	Wides	NBs
Katherine Brunt	6	0	22	0	3.66	0	0
Anya Shrubsole	9.4	0	46	6	4.75	4	0
Nat Sciver	5	1	26	0	5.20	0	0
Jenny Gunn	7	2	17	0	2.42	1	0
Laura Marsh	10	1	40	0	4.00	1	0
Alex Hartley	10	0	58	2	5.80	1	0
Heather Knight	1	0	7	0	7.00	0	1
