= Monika Das =

Indian politician

Member of Parliament, Rajya Sabha
- In office 1980–1986
- Constituency: Karnataka

Personal details
- Born: 1939 (age 86–87)
- Party: Indian National Congress

Monika Das is an Indian politician. She was a Member of Parliament, representing Karnataka in the Rajya Sabha the upper house of India's Parliament representing the Indian National Congress.
