= Rita Debbarma =

Indian cricketer (born 1995)

Personal information
- Born: 14 January 1995 (age 31); Tripura
- Batting: Right-handed
- Bowling: Right-arm medium

Domestic team information
- Years: Team
- 2016-present: Tripura
- Source: Cricinfo, 19 March 2021

Rita Debbarma (born 14 January 1995) is an Indian cricketer who plays for Tripura. She made her Twenty20 debut on 4 January 2016, for Tripura in the 2015-16 Inter State Women's Twenty20 Competition.
