= Nooshin Al Khadeer =

Indian cricketer (born 1981)

Personal information
- Full name: Nooshin Al Khadeer
- Born: 13 February 1981 (age 45); Kalaburagi, Karnataka, India
- Nickname: Noosh
- Batting: Right-handed
- Bowling: Right-arm off break
- Role: Bowler

International information
- National side: India (2002–2012)
- Test debut (cap 62): 27 November 2003 v New Zealand
- Last Test: 29 August 2006 v England
- ODI debut (cap 63): 8 January 2002 v England
- Last ODI: 16 March 2012 v Australia
- T20I debut (cap 1): 5 August 2006 v England
- Last T20I: 28 March 2008 v Australia

Domestic team information
- Years: Team
- 2000/01–2001/02: Karnataka
- 2004/05–2011/12: Railways

Career statistics
Competition	WTest	WODI	WT20I	WLA
Matches	5	78	2	163
Runs scored	46	153	–	352
Batting average	9.20	8.05	–	10.05
100s/50s	0/0	0/0	–	0/0
Top score	16*	21	–	27
Balls bowled	1,239	4,036	42	8,382
Wickets	14	100	1	187
Bowling average	26.64	24.02	41.00	22.77
5 wickets in innings	0	1	0	1
10 wickets in match	0	0	0	0
Best bowling	3/30	5/14	1/28	5/14
Catches/stumpings	0/–	17/–	0/–	34/–
Medal record
Representing India
Women's cricket
World Cup
Runner-up	2005 South Africa
- Source: CricketArchive, 23 August 2022

Nooshin Al Khadeer (born 13 February 1981) is an Indian former cricketer and current national coach of U-19 Women's Cricket team. She played as a right-arm off break bowler. She appeared in five Test matches, 78 One Day Internationals and two Twenty20 Internationals for India from 2002 to 2012. She played domestic cricket for Karnataka and Railways.

She is currently the coach of Railways. and India women's national under-19 cricket Team Coach for the 2025 ICC Under-19 Women's T20 World Cup. She was also head coach of Supernovas for the 2022 Women's T20 Challenge.

== Career ==
She made her debut in international cricket on 8 January 2002 in a One Day International against England. She was ranked No. 1 in the world in 2003. She took 100 wickets in ODIs.
