= Priya Punia =

Indian cricketer (born 1996)

Personal information
- Full name: Priya Surender Punia
- Born: 6 August 1996 (age 30); Jaipur, Rajasthan, India
- Batting: Right-handed
- Bowling: Right-arm medium
- Role: Batter

International information
- National side: India
- ODI debut (cap 127): 9 October 2019 v South Africa
- Last ODI: 8 December 2024 v Australia
- T20I debut (cap 61): 6 February 2019 v New Zealand
- Last T20I: 10 February 2019 v New Zealand

Domestic team information
- Years: Team
- 2013/14–present: Delhi
- 2014/15–2017/18: North Zone
- 2015–2017/18: India Green
- 2019–present: Supernovas

Career statistics
Competition	WODI	WT20I
Matches	11	3
Runs scored	273	9
Batting average	27.30	3
100s/50s	-/2	-/-
Top score	75*	4
Balls bowled
Wickets
Bowling average
5 wickets in innings
10 wickets in match
Best bowling
Catches/stumpings	0/–	1/–
- Source: ESPNcricinfo, 25 May 2021

Priya Punia (born 6 August 1996) is an Indian cricketer. In December 2018, she was named in India's squad for their series against New Zealand. She made her Women's Twenty20 International cricket (WT20I) debut for India against New Zealand Women on 6 February 2019.

In September 2019, she was named in India's Women's One Day International (WODI) squad for their series against South Africa. She made her WODI debut against South Africa, on 9 October 2019.

In May 2021, she was named in India's Test squad for their one-off match against the England women's cricket team.

In the T20 match starting on 9 July 2023, the BCCI announced the Indian women's team for the ODI series to be played against Bangladesh, in which Priya Punia has been selected.
