= Moti Bagh Stadium =

Cricket stadium

Coordinates: 22°17′23″N 73°11′24″E

Moti Baug Stadium
- Motibaug Palace Ground

Ground information
- Location: Vadodara, Gujarat, India
- Establishment: 1956
- Capacity: 18,000
- Owner: Baroda Cricket Association
- Operator: Baroda Cricket Association
- Tenants: Baroda cricket team
- End names
- n/a

International information
- First ODI: 7 November 1983: India v West Indies
- Last ODI: 17 February 1996: New Zealand v Netherlands
- As of June 2014; Source: Moti Bagh Stadium, ESPNcricinfo

Motibaug Stadium is a cricket stadium located in Vadodara, Gujarat.

The ground form part of the Lakshmi Vilas Palace building complex - a sprawling 700-acre (2.8 km^{2}) complex in the heart of the city. The palace and the stadium, earlied belonged to the former rulers of Baroda and the patrons of cricket in Baroda - the Gaekwad.

The stadium has a seating capacity of 18,000 people. The use of the stadium for International cricket has been discontinued in favour of IPCL Sports Complex Ground.

== List of Centuries ==
=== Key ===
- * denotes that the batsman was not out.
- Inns. denotes the number of the innings in the match.
- Balls denotes the number of balls faced in an innings.
- NR denotes that the number of balls was not recorded.
- Parentheses next to the player's score denotes his century number at Edgbaston.
- The column title Date refers to the date the match started.
- The column title Result refers to the player's team result

=== One Day Internationals ===
No.	Score	Player	Team	Balls	Inns.	Opposing team	Date	Result
1	108*	Mohammad Azharuddin	India	65	2	New Zealand	17 December 1988	Won

== List of Five Wicket Hauls ==
=== Key ===
Symbol	Meaning
†	The bowler was man of the match
‡	10 or more wickets taken in the match
§	One of two five-wicket hauls by the bowler in the match
Date	Day the Test started or ODI was held
Inn	Innings in which five-wicket haul was taken
Overs	Number of overs bowled.
Runs	Number of runs conceded
Wkts	Number of wickets taken
Econ	Runs conceded per over
Batsmen	Batsmen whose wickets were taken
Drawn	The match was drawn.

=== One Day Internationals ===
No.	Bowler	Date	Team	Opposing team	Inn	Overs	Runs	Wkts	Econ	Batsmen	Result
1	Graeme Labrooy	15 January 1987	Sri Lanka	India	1	10	57	5	5.79	Sunil Gavaskar; Dilip Vengsarkar; Chandrakant Pandit; Ravi Shastri; Mohammad Azharuddin	Sri Lanka won
