= Diana David =

Indian cricketer (born 1985)

Personal information
- Full name: Diana Pilli David
- Born: 2 March 1985 (age 41); Chirala, Andhra Pradesh, India
- Batting: Right-handed
- Bowling: Right-arm off-break

International information
- National side: India
- ODI debut (cap 74): 26 February 2004 v West Indies
- Last ODI: 1 March 2010 v England
- T20I debut (cap 22): 6 March 2010 v England
- Last T20I: 18 February 2012 v West Indies

Career statistics
Competition	WODI	WT20I
Matches	15	13
Runs scored	52	15
Batting average	4.72	3.00
100s/50s	0/0	0/0
Top score	24	7*
Balls bowled	727	258
Wickets	15	16
Bowling average	27.06	14.18
5 wickets in innings	0	0
10 wickets in match	0	0
Best bowling	3/39	4/12
Catches/stumpings	5/0	2/0
- Source: ESPNcricinfo, 20 April 2020

Diana Pilli David (born 2 March 1985) is a cricketer who represents India. She is a right hand batswoman and bowls right-arm off-breaks. She has played six ODIs, taking eight wickets.

== Early life ==
She was born in Chirala, Andhra Pradesh.

== Career ==
She made her ODI debut against the West Indies in 2004 and played her last ODI for the country in 2010 and the last Twenty20 International in February 2012.
