= Reema Malhotra =

Indian cricketer (born 1980)

Personal information
- Full name: Reema Malhotra
- Born: 17 October 1980 (age 46); New Delhi, India
- Nickname: Reems
- Batting: Right-handed
- Bowling: Right-arm leg break
- Role: All-rounder

International information
- National side: India (2003–2013)
- Only Test (cap 72): 29 August 2006 v England
- ODI debut (cap 70): 1 February 2003 v Australia
- Last ODI: 7 February 2013 v Pakistan
- T20I debut (cap 7): 5 August 2006 v England
- Last T20I: 31 October 2012 v Pakistan

Domestic team information
- Years: Team
- 1999/00–2005/06: Delhi
- 2006/07–2007/08: Railways
- 2008/09–2011/12: Delhi
- 2012/13–2013/14: Assam
- 2014/15–2019/20: Delhi

Career statistics
| Competition | WTest | WODI | WT20I | WLA |
|---|---|---|---|---|
| Matches | 1 | 41 | 22 | 184 |
| Runs scored | 23 | 462 | 115 | 3,680 |
| Batting average | 23.00 | 21.00 | 19.16 | 36.43 |
| 100s/50s | 0/0 | 0/1 | 0/0 | 1/20 |
| Top score | 12* | 59* | 32* | 104* |
| Balls bowled | 18 | 845 | 198 | 5,467 |
| Wickets | 0 | 22 | 9 | 201 |
| Bowling average | – | 30.54 | 23.33 | 18.92 |
| 5 wickets in innings | 0 | 0 | 0 | 1 |
| 10 wickets in match | 0 | 0 | 0 | 0 |
| Best bowling | – | 3/31 | 2/13 | 5/55 |
| Catches/stumpings | 0/– | 4/– | 6/– | 69/– |
- Source: CricketArchive, 31 August 2022

Reema Malhotra (born 17 October 1980) is an Indian former cricketer who played as a right-handed batter and right-arm leg break bowler. She appeared in one Test match, 41 One Day Internationals and 22 Twenty20 Internationals for India between 2003 and 2013. She played domestic cricket for Delhi, Railways and Assam.
