= Thirush Kamini =

Indian cricketer

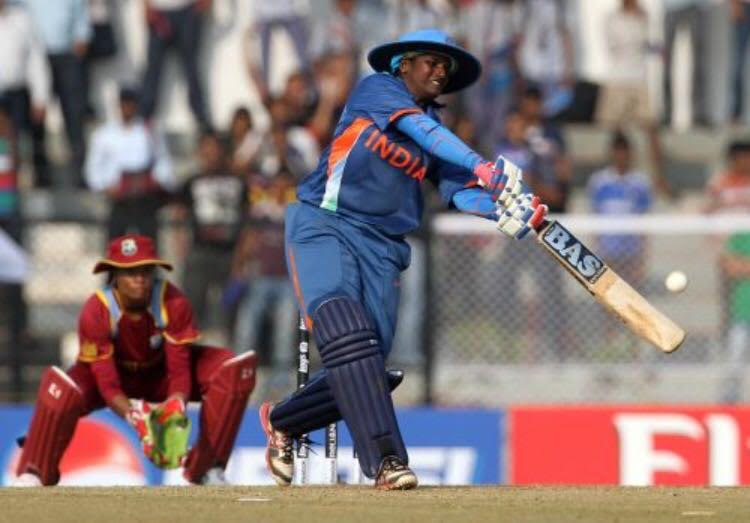
- Kamini plays a shot during her century against the West Indies in the ICC Women's World Cup 2013

Personal information
- Full name: Murugesan Dickeshwashankar Thirush Kamini
- Born: 30 July 1990 (age 36); Chennai, Tamil Nadu, India
- Batting: Left-handed
- Bowling: Right-arm legbreak
- Role: Batter

International information
- National side: India
- Test debut (cap 74): 13 August 2014 v England
- Last Test: 16 November 2014 v South Africa
- ODI debut (cap 83): 7 March 2006 v Pakistan
- Last ODI: 10 February 2017 v Ireland
- ODI shirt no.: 16
- T20I debut (cap 12): 28 October 2008 v Australia
- Last T20I: 4 April 2013 v Bangladesh

Domestic team information
- Years: Team
- 2000/01–2014/15: Tamil Nadu Women
- 2015/16–present: Railways Women

Career statistics
| Competition | Test | ODI | T20I |
|---|---|---|---|
| Matches | 2 | 39 | 3 |
| Runs scored | 237 | 825 | 67 |
| Batting average | 79.00 | 25.78 | 33.50 |
| 100s/50s | 1/0 | 2/3 | 0/1 |
| Top score | 192 | 113* | 56 |
| Balls bowled | 6 | 384 | – |
| Wickets | 0 | 9 | – |
| Bowling average | – | 45.53 | – |
| 5 wickets in innings | – | 30.11 | – |
| 10 wickets in match | – | 0 | – |
| Best bowling | – | 3/19 | – |
| Catches/stumpings | 0/– | 5/– | 0/– |
- Source: ESPN Cricinfo, 17 January 2020

Thirush Kamini (born 30 July 1990) is an Indian former cricketer who played 39 women's one-day internationals for the national team.

== Cricket career ==
Thirushkamini started playing at the age of six when her father found her interest in cricket and has been coached by him ever since. She went on to represent Under 16 Tamil Nadu state at the age of 8 and represented Senior state at the age of 10. When she was 15 she represented Under 21 India that toured Pakistan and won Player of the Match. She went on to represent India at the age of 16 and won the Player of the Series award in her debut tournament. In 2007, she won the Allan Border Gavaskar scholarship and got the opportunity to train at the Centre of Excellence, Brisbane, Australia.

Thirushkamini is the only woman cricketer to have won BCCI Player Of the Year on three occasions (2007-2008 Junior Player of the Year, 2009-2010 Senior Player of the Year, 2012-2013 Senior Player of the Year).

She has scored a century against West Indies in Women's World Cup 2013. Thirushkamini overtook Mithali Raj's record for the highest run in a World Cup game by scoring a 100 from 146 balls in the first match of ICC Women's World Cup 2013 and became the first Indian Women to score a Century in World Cup. In 2014, Kamini scored 192 off 430 balls in the test match against South Africa which is the second best score by an Indian women and the highest score by an Indian opener. She recently scored her career best unbeaten 113 off 194 balls against Ireland Women at the ICC Women World Cup Qualifiers 2017 at Colombo, Sri Lanka and became the first Indian woman to score a century in the Qualifiers as well. She is currently a contracted BCCI Grade A player.

She is the only woman cricketer in the history of the game to be declared out for Obstructing the field.

== International centuries ==
Test centuries
| Runs | Match | Opponents | City | Venue | Year |
|---|---|---|---|---|---|
| 192 | 2 | South Africa | Mysore, India | Srikantadatta Narasimha Raja Wadeyar Ground | 2014 |

- Source: Cricinfo

One-Day International centuries
| Runs | Match | Opponents | City | Venue | Year |
|---|---|---|---|---|---|
| 100 | 22 | West Indies | Mumbai, India | Brabourne Stadium | 2013 |
| 113* | 38 | Ireland | Colombo, Sri Lanka | P Sara Oval | 2017 |

- Source: CricInfo

== Personal life ==
Growing up, she was coached by Dickshwashankar her father, who was a hockey player for Tamil Nadu. He played alongside Olympian Vasudevan Baskaran.

Thirush Kamini did her schooling in Sacred Heart Church Park School and under-graduation and her master's degree from M.O.P. Vaishnav College for Women, Chennai. She also completed her MPhil from Madras University.

She played for Indian Railways while employed by Southern Railway in the personnel branch and. She resigned the job in Southern Railway in July 2021.

== Awards ==
- BCCI Junior Player of the Year 2007–2008
- BCCI Senior Player of the Year 2009–2010
- BCCI Senior Player of the Year 2012-2014

== See also ==
- List of centuries in women's One Day International cricket
- List of centuries in women's Test cricket
