= Mansi Joshi =

Indian cricketer

Personal information
- Born: 18 August 1993 (age 33); Tehri, Uttarakhand, India
- Batting: Right-handed
- Bowling: Right-arm medium-fast
- Role: Bowler

International information
- National side: India
- ODI debut (cap 120): 10 February 2017 v Ireland
- Last ODI: 14 March 2021 v South Africa
- ODI shirt no.: 10
- T20I debut (cap 54): 26 November 2016 v Bangladesh
- Last T20I: 20 November 2019 v West Indies

Domestic team information
- Years: Team
- 2009/10–present: Haryana
- 2010/11–2016/17: North Zone
- 2013/14–2018/19: India Blue
- 2022–present: Supernovas
- 2023: Gujarat Giants

Career statistics
Competition	WODI	WT20I
Matches	11	8
Runs scored	20	6
Batting average	6.66	–
100s/50s	0/0	0/0
Top score	12	3*
Balls bowled	458	50
Wickets	17	3
Bowling average	20.76	58.66
5 wickets in innings	0	0
10 wickets in match	0	0
Best bowling	3/16	1/8
Catches/stumpings	5/–	1/–
- Source: ESPNcricinfo, 14 March 2021

Mansi Joshi (born 18 August 1993) is an Indian international cricketer who made her debut for the Indian national team in November 2016. Known mainly for her right-arm medium-fast bowling, she is a lower-order right-handed batsman. She is currently being coached by Virendra Singh Rautela.

Joshi was born in Tehri in Uttarakhand She plays domestic cricket for Haryana. She has always been inspired by Sachin Tendulkar. She attended trials at Haryana Cricket Association and got selected in Under-19 in Senior Women's state team. She was named in India's squad for the Twenty20 International (T20I) component of a November 2016 series against the West Indies. She was not selected in any of her team's matches in that series, but made her T20I debut later in the month, playing against Bangladesh in the 2016 Women's Twenty20 Asia Cup in Thailand. She took 1/8 on debut, and in the next game took 2/8 against Thailand and was named player of the match (although that game did not have T20I status).

She made her Women's One Day International cricket (WODI) debut against Ireland in the 2017 Women's Cricket World Cup Qualifier on 10 February 2017. She was felicitated by Hindustan Times on May 26, 2017, in the HT Youth Forum for their flagship event featuring Top 30 under 30. Joshi was part of the Indian team to reach the final of the 2017 Women's Cricket World Cup where the team lost to England by nine runs.

In October 2018, she was named in India's squad for the 2018 ICC Women's World Twenty20 tournament in the West Indies.
