= Rumeli Dhar =

Indian cricketer (born 1983)

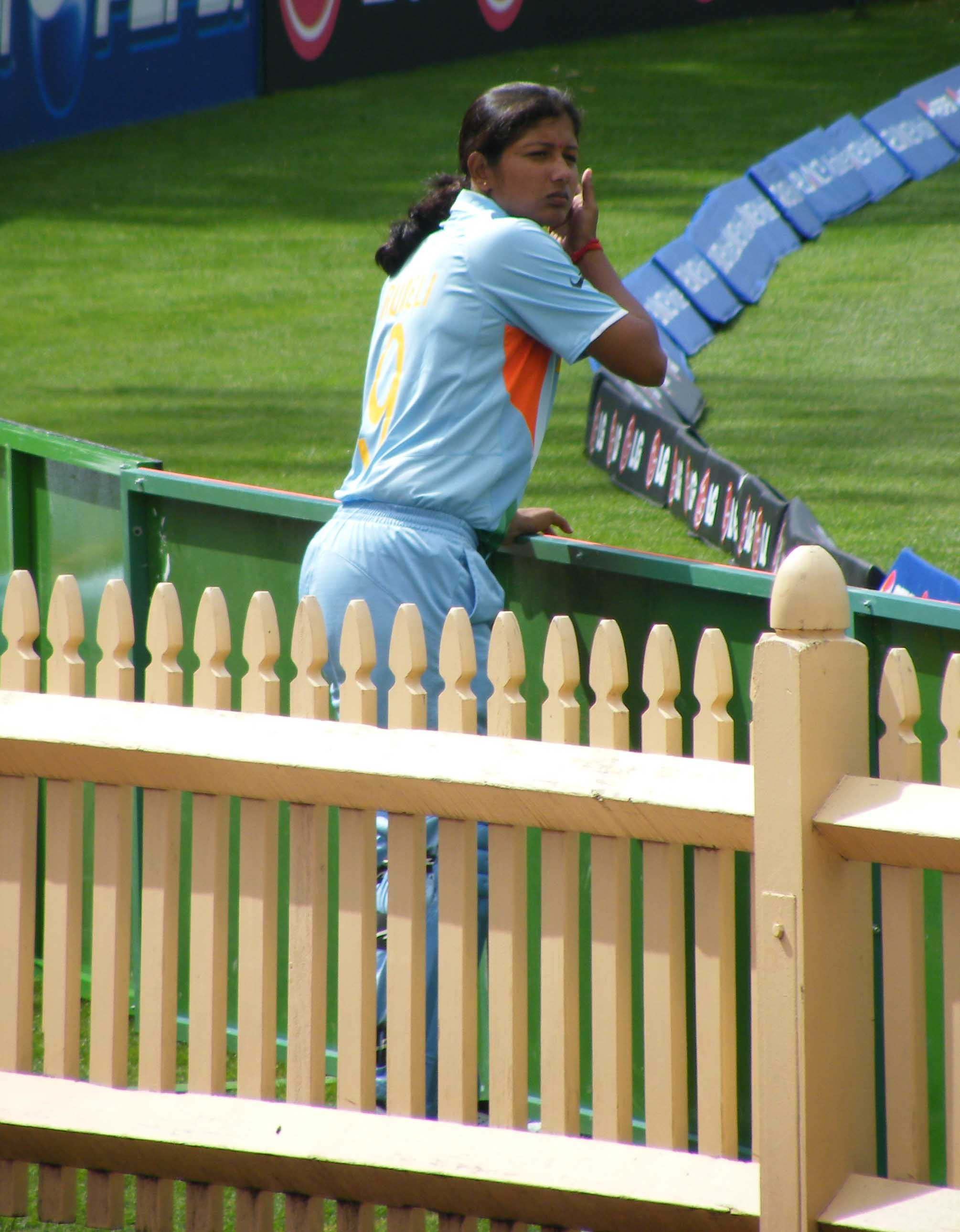
- Rumeli Dhar in South Africa during 2005 Women's Cricket World Cup

Personal information
- Full name: Rumeli Anup Dhar
- Born: 9 December 1983 (age 42); Calcutta (now Kolkata), India
- Batting: Right-handed
- Bowling: Right-arm medium
- Role: All-rounder

International information
- National side: India (2005–2018)
- Test debut (cap 64): 21 November 2005 v England
- Last Test: 29 August 2006 v England
- ODI debut (cap 69): 27 January 2003 v England
- Last ODI: 14 March 2012 v Australia
- T20I debut (cap 3): 5 August 2006 v England
- Last T20I: 22 March 2018 v Australia

Domestic team information
- Years: Team
- 1999/00: Bengal
- 2000/01–2002/03: Air India
- 2004/05–2011/12: Railways
- 2013/14–2014/15: Rajasthan
- 2015/16–2016/17: Assam
- 2017/18: Delhi
- 2018/19: Railways
- 2019/20–2021/22: Bengal

Career statistics
Competition	WTest	WODI	WT20I	WLA
Matches	4	78	18	224
Runs scored	236	961	131	3,525
Batting average	29.50	19.61	18.71	23.34
100s/50s	0/1	0/6	0/1	1/21
Top score	57	92*	66*	104
Balls bowled	552	3,015	295	8,703
Wickets	8	63	13	204
Bowling average	21.75	27.38	23.30	21.03
5 wickets in innings	0	0	0	0
10 wickets in match	0	0	0	0
Best bowling	2/16	4/19	3/13	4/13
Catches/stumpings	0/–	37/–	7/–	88/1
Medal record
Representing India
Women's cricket
World Cup
Runner-up	2005 South Africa

Rumeli Anup Dhar (born 9 December 1983) is an Indian former cricketer who played as an all-rounder, batting right-handed and bowling right-arm medium. She appeared in four Test matches, 78 One Day Internationals and 18 Twenty20 Internationals for India between 2003 and 2018. She played domestic cricket for Bengal, Air India, Railways, Rajasthan, Assam and Delhi. She announced her retirement from all forms of cricket in June 2022. She is currently the head coach of the Odisha women's cricket team.

== Career ==
Rumeli Dhar made her international debut on 27 January 2003, in the 2002–03 World Series of Women's Cricket against England in New Zealand at Bert Sutcliffe Oval, Lincoln. She was part of the India side that reached the final of the 2005 World Cup, and was the side's joint-leading wicket-taker at the 2009 World Twenty20. Having not played an international match since 2012, on the back of her domestic performances, Dhar made an "unlikely" comeback to the national side in 2018, where she played her final three international matches, two against South Africa and one against Australia.
