= Sulakshana Naik =

Indian cricketer (born 1978)

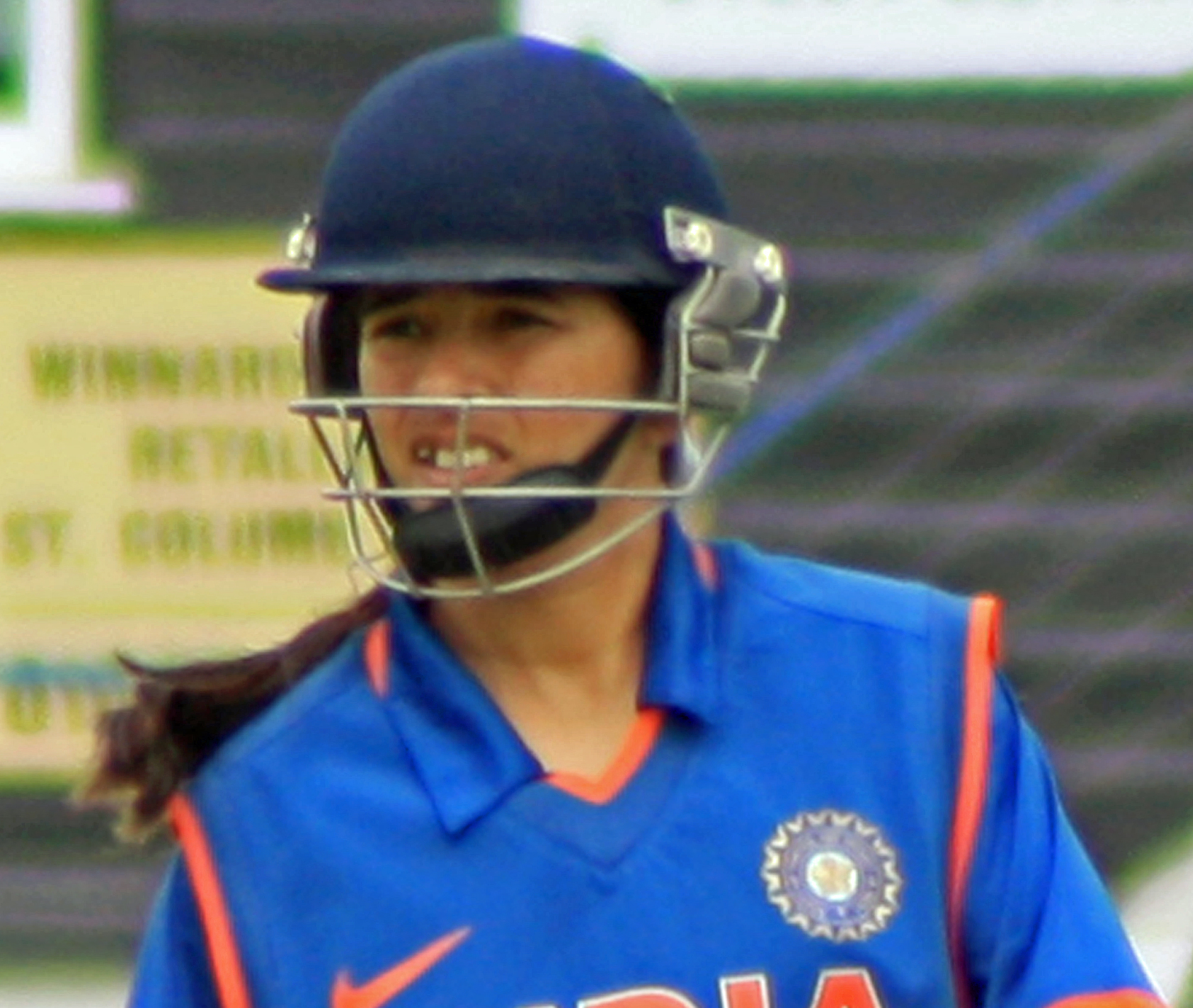
- Sulakshana Naik in 2012

Personal information
- Full name: Sulakshana Naik
- Born: 10 November 1978 (age 48); Mumbai, Maharashtra, India
- Batting: Right-handed
- Role: Wicket-keeper

International information
- National side: India (2002–2013)
- Test debut (cap 60): 14 August 2002 v England
- Last Test: 29 August 2006 v England
- ODI debut (cap 66): 10 July 2002 v England
- Last ODI: 21 March 2009 v Australia
- T20I debut (cap 8): 5 August 2006 v England
- Last T20I: 31 October 2012 v Pakistan

Domestic team information
- Years: Team
- 2000/01: Mumbai
- 2001/02–2012/13: Railways
- 2013/14–2016/17: Mumbai

Career statistics
Competition	WTest	WODI	WT20I	WLA
Matches	2	46	31	173
Runs scored	62	574	384	3,451
Batting average	20.66	15.51	14.76	24.65
100s/50s	0/0	0/2	0/1	4/16
Top score	25	79*	59	161*
Catches/stumpings	1/2	28/32	10/21	129/103
- Source: CricketArchive, 22 August 2022

Sulakshana Naik (born 10 November 1978) is an Indian former cricketer who played as a wicket-keeper and right-handed batter. She appeared in two Test matches, 46 One Day Internationals and 31 Twenty20 Internationals for India from 2002 to 2013. She played domestic cricket for Mumbai and Railways.

In January 2020 she was appointed as a member of the Cricket Advisory Committee at the BCCI.
