= Sushma Verma =

Indian cricketer

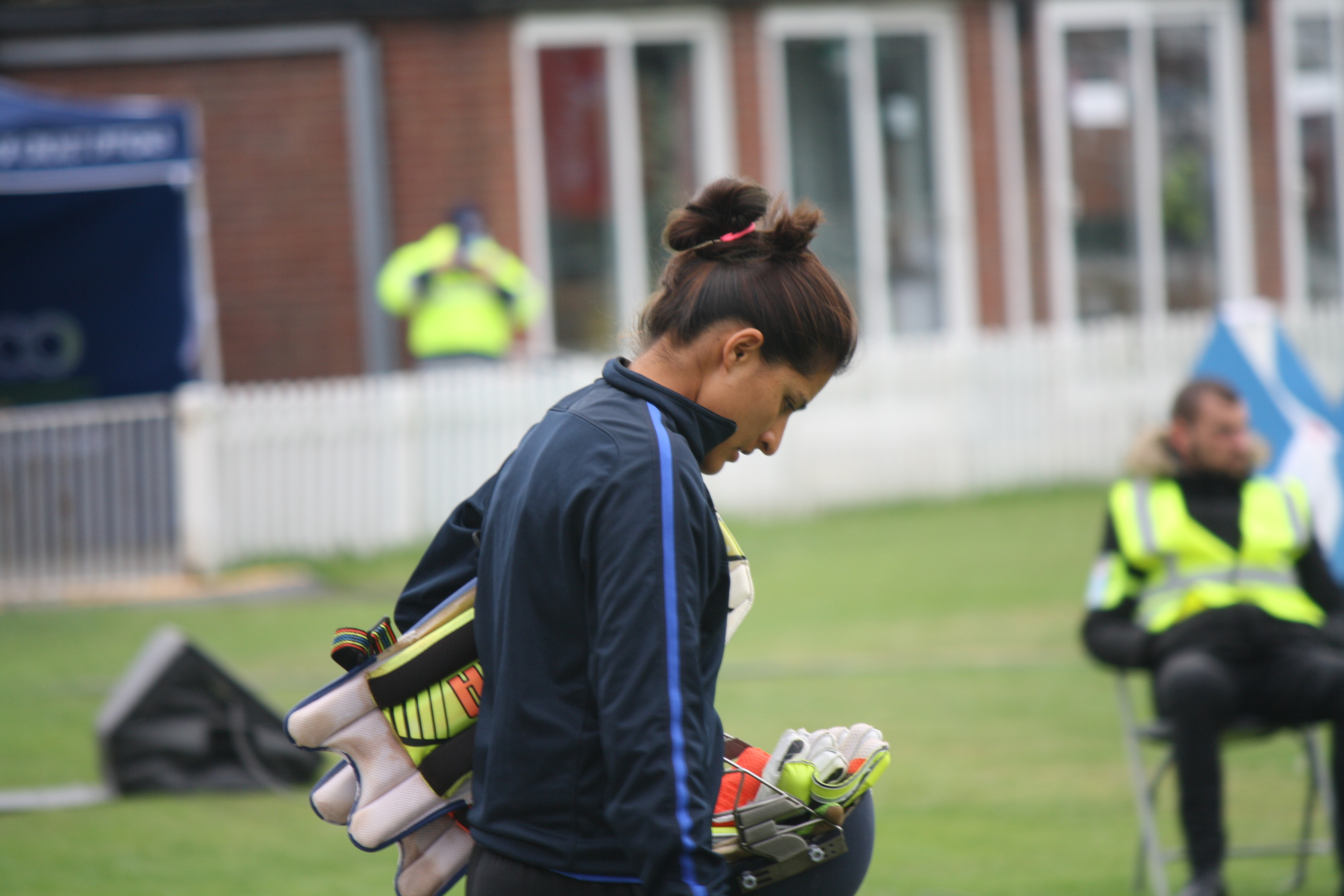
- Verma at the 2017 World Cup

Personal information
- Full name: Sushma Verma
- Born: 5 November 1992 (age 34); Shimla, Himachal Pradesh, India
- Batting: Right-handed
- Role: Wicket-keeper

International information
- National side: India (2013 - 2021)
- Test debut (cap 83): 16 November 2014 v South Africa
- ODI debut (cap 113): 24 November 2014 v South Africa
- Last ODI: 17 March 2021 v South Africa
- ODI shirt no.: 5
- T20I debut (cap 42): 5 April 2013 v Bangladesh
- Last T20I: 4 December 2016 v Pakistan

Domestic team information
- Years: Team
- 2011–present: Himachal Pradesh
- 2019–2020: Velocity
- 2023: Gujarat Giants

Career statistics
Competition	WTest	WODI	WT20I
Matches	1	38	19
Runs scored	–	178	31
Batting average	–	9.88	10.33
100s/50s	–	0/0	0/0
Top score	–	41	12
Catches/stumpings	4/1	25/21	6/19
- Source: ESPNcricinfo, 17 March 2021

Sushma Verma (born 5 November 1992) is an Indian cricketer. She started her national-level career as a wicket-keeper and right-handed batter in the India women's national cricket team.

After the 2017 Women's Cricket World Cup game, the Himachal Pradesh chief minister Virbhadra Singh offered her a post of Deputy Superintendent of Police.

== Early life ==
Sushma Verma was born on 3 November 1992 in Shimla, Himachal Pradesh . Her father “Bhopal Singh Verma” wanted her to stay back close to home. But Sushma's choice was to go to “Portmore Govt Model” school in Shimla. From flirting with multiple sports – volleyball, handball, and badminton. she has been a state level player at these games but cricket somehow found its way to load Shusma. (official website)

== Domestic cricket ==
Before that, she played for the Himachal Pradesh Cricket Association. Under her captaincy, the Himachal team were the runners-up at the Under-19 All-India women's tournament in 2011. She is the first cricketer from Himachal Pradesh, male or female, to represent India in international cricket.

Owing to fewer opportunities in domestic, she started playing for Railways. She played along with Mithali Raj, Harmanpreet Kaur and Punam Raut.

== International cricket ==
Verma was part of the Indian team to reach the final of the 2017 Women's Cricket World Cup where the team lost to England by nine runs. In the inaugural WPL 2023, she was picked up by Gujarat Giants.
