= Mona Meshram =

Indian cricketer (born 1991)

Personal information
- Full name: Mona Meshram
- Born: 30 September 1991 (age 35); Nagpur, India
- Batting: Right-handed
- Bowling: Right-arm medium
- Role: Batter

International information
- National side: India (2012–2019)
- ODI debut (cap 102): 24 June 2012 v Ireland
- Last ODI: 28 February 2019 v England
- ODI shirt no.: 30
- T20I debut (cap 33): 26 June 2012 v England
- Last T20I: 6 June 2018 v Bangladesh

Domestic team information
- Years: Team
- Vidarbha Women
- Railways Women
- India Blue women
- 2018: Supernovas

Career statistics
Competition	WODI	WT20I
Matches	26	11
Runs scored	352	125
Batting average	18.52	17.85
100s/50s	0/3	0/0
Top score	78*	32
Balls bowled	144	50
Wickets	1	1
Bowling average	119.00	50.00
5 wickets in innings	0	0
10 wickets in match	0	–
Best bowling	1/15	1/9
Catches/stumpings	10/–	2/–
- Source: ESPNcricinfo, 17 January 2020

Mona Meshram (born 30 September 1991) is a former Indian cricketer. She played right-handed batter and right-arm medium bowler.

Meshram was a part of the Indian team to reach the 2017 Women's Cricket World Cup Final at Lords. In pursuit of England's target of 228, India were bowled out for 219, losing by nine runs.

On September 8, 2025 Mona announced she is stepping down from the Indian Railway squad after 12 years with the team.

== Award ==
She was the recipient of the BCCI’s M.A. Chidambaram Award for being the best Junior woman cricketer of the 2010–11 season (623 runs at 103.83 in 8 matches, inclusive of one century and 5 half centuries).
