= Gouher Sultana =

Indian cricketer (born 1988)

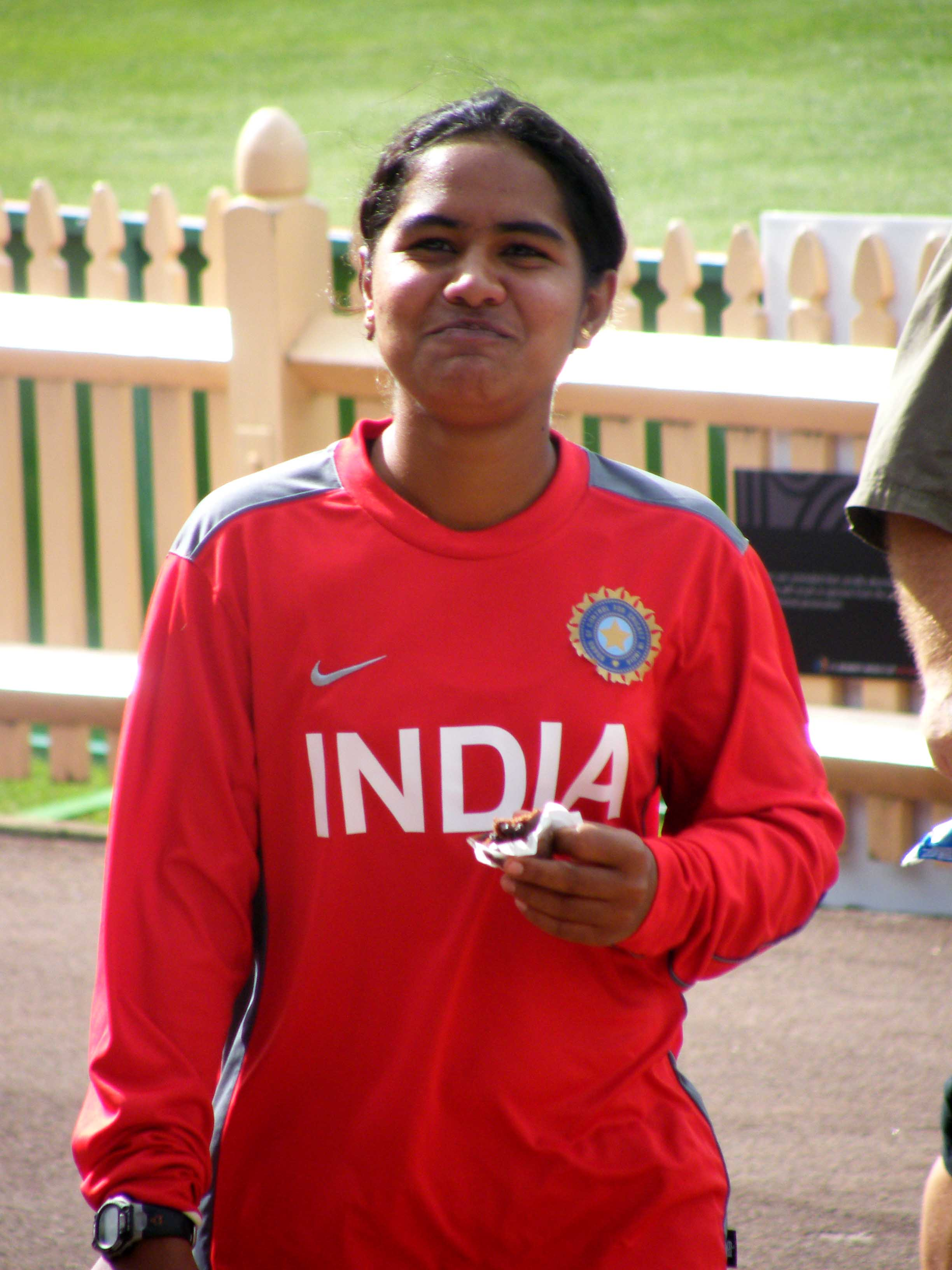

Personal information
- Full name: Gouher Sultana
- Born: 31 March 1988 (age 38); Hyderabad, Andhra Pradesh, India
- Batting: Right-handed
- Bowling: Slow left-arm orthodox

International information
- National side: India (2008–2014)
- ODI debut (cap 87): 5 May 2008 v Pakistan
- Last ODI: 21 Jan 2014 v Sri Lanka
- T20I debut (cap 15): 28 October 2008 v Australia
- Last T20I: 2 April 2014 v Pakistan

Career statistics
Competition	ODI	T20I
Matches	50	37
Runs scored	96	6
Batting average	10.66	6.00
100s/50s	0/0	0/0
Top score	22	3*
Balls bowled	2308	797
Wickets	66	29
Bowling average	19.39	26.27
5 wickets in innings	0	0
10 wickets in match	0	0
Best bowling	4/4	3/17
Catches/stumpings	15/–	13/–
- Source: ESPNcricinfo, 17 April 2014

Gouher Sultana (born 31 March 1988) is an Indian former cricketer. Sultana was born in Hyderabad. She has played international cricket for India's Under-21 women's team, and the India national women's cricket team, mainly as a left-arm orthodox spin bowler.

She has played in 23 One-day Internationals since her debut against Pakistan in the Women's Asia Cup at Kurunegala on 5 May 2008, including the 2009 Women's Cricket World Cup. In domestic cricket she represented Hyderabad, Indian Railways, Pondicherry, and Bengal. She has also played in seven Twenty20 Internationals since her debut against Australia in Sydney on 28 October 2008.

She and Amita Sharma hold the record for the highest ever 10th wicket partnership in Women's ODI history (58 runs).

In December 2023, she was signed by UP Warriorz at India's Women's Premier League auction, for the 2024 season.

In August 2025, Sultana announced her retirement form all forms of cricket.
