= Niranjana Nagarajan =

Indian cricketer (born 1988)

Nagarajan Niranjana
Personal information
- Born: 9 October 1988 (age 38); Madras, Tamil Nadu, India
- Batting: Right-handed
- Bowling: Right-arm medium
- Role: Bowler

International information
- National side: India (2008—2016)
- Test debut (cap 77): 13 August 2014 v England
- Last Test: 16 November 2014 v South Africa
- ODI debut (cap 90): 30 August 2008 v England
- Last ODI: 19 February 2016 v Sri Lanka
- T20I debut (cap 34): 26 June 2012 v England
- Last T20I: 26 February 2016 v Sri Lanka

Domestic team information
- Years: Team
- 2006–2013, 2018–present: Tamil Nadu Women
- 2006–2013: South Zone Women
- 2013–2017: Railways Women
- 2013–2014: Central Zone Women

Career statistics
Competition	WTest	WODI	WT20I
Matches	2	22	14
Runs scored	27	70	42
Batting average	27	8.75	7.00
100s/50s	0/0	0/0	0/0
Top score	27	12*	15
Balls bowled	236	965	271
Wickets	4	24	9
Bowling average	23.75	28.04	26.22
5 wickets in innings	0	0	0
10 wickets in match	0	0	0
Best bowling	4/19	3/24	2/15
Catches/stumpings	3/-	4/-	3/-
- Source: ESPNcricinfo, 22 January 2017

Niranjana Nagarajan (born 9 October 1988) is an Indian cricketer. She represented India in WTests, WODIs and WT20I. She is a right-hand batsman and bowls right-arm medium-fast. On 15 June 2024, she announced her retirement from all forms of cricket.

== Career ==
In August 2008, she was added to national squad as a replacement player for Rumeli Dhar. She made her debut in international cricket on 30 August 2008 during India's tour of England in a WODI against England at North Parade, Bath. She also played for Tamil Nadu, Railways, South Zone and Central Zone in domestic cricket.

She displayed her bowling talent on the English ground when Indian Women played England in their five-match Test series in 2014. The claimed bowling figures of 4/19 as the England team were bowled out for just 92 runs.

As of 2017, she had played two Tests, 22 ODIs and 14 T20Is for India.
