= Anuja Patil =

Indian cricketer (born 1992)

Personal information
- Born: 28 June 1992 (age 34); Kolhapur, Maharashtra, India
- Batting: Right-handed
- Bowling: Right-arm off break

International information
- National side: India (2012–2019)
- T20I debut (cap 35): 29 September 2012 v England
- Last T20I: 20 November 2019 v West Indies

Career statistics
| Competition | WT20I |
|---|---|
| Matches | 50 |
| Runs scored | 386 |
| Batting average | 17.54 |
| 100s/50s | 0/1 |
| Top score | 54* |
| Balls bowled | 1036 |
| Wickets | 48 |
| Bowling average | 21.00 |
| 5 wickets in innings | 0 |
| 10 wickets in match | 0 |
| Best bowling | 3/14 |
| Catches/stumpings | 17/- |
- Source: ESPNcricinfo, 19 January 2020

Anuja Patil (born 28 June 1992) is a cricketer from Maharashtra who plays in Women's Twenty20 Internationals (WT20Is) for India.

== Career ==
She made her International T20 cricket debut for India against England at Galle International Stadium, Galle on 29 September 2012. Patil also played for Maharashtra state.

In October 2018, she was named in India's squad for the 2018 ICC Women's World Twenty20 tournament in the West Indies. In November 2019, during the series against the West Indies, she played in her 50th WT20I match.
