= Amita Sharma =

Indian cricketer (born 1982)

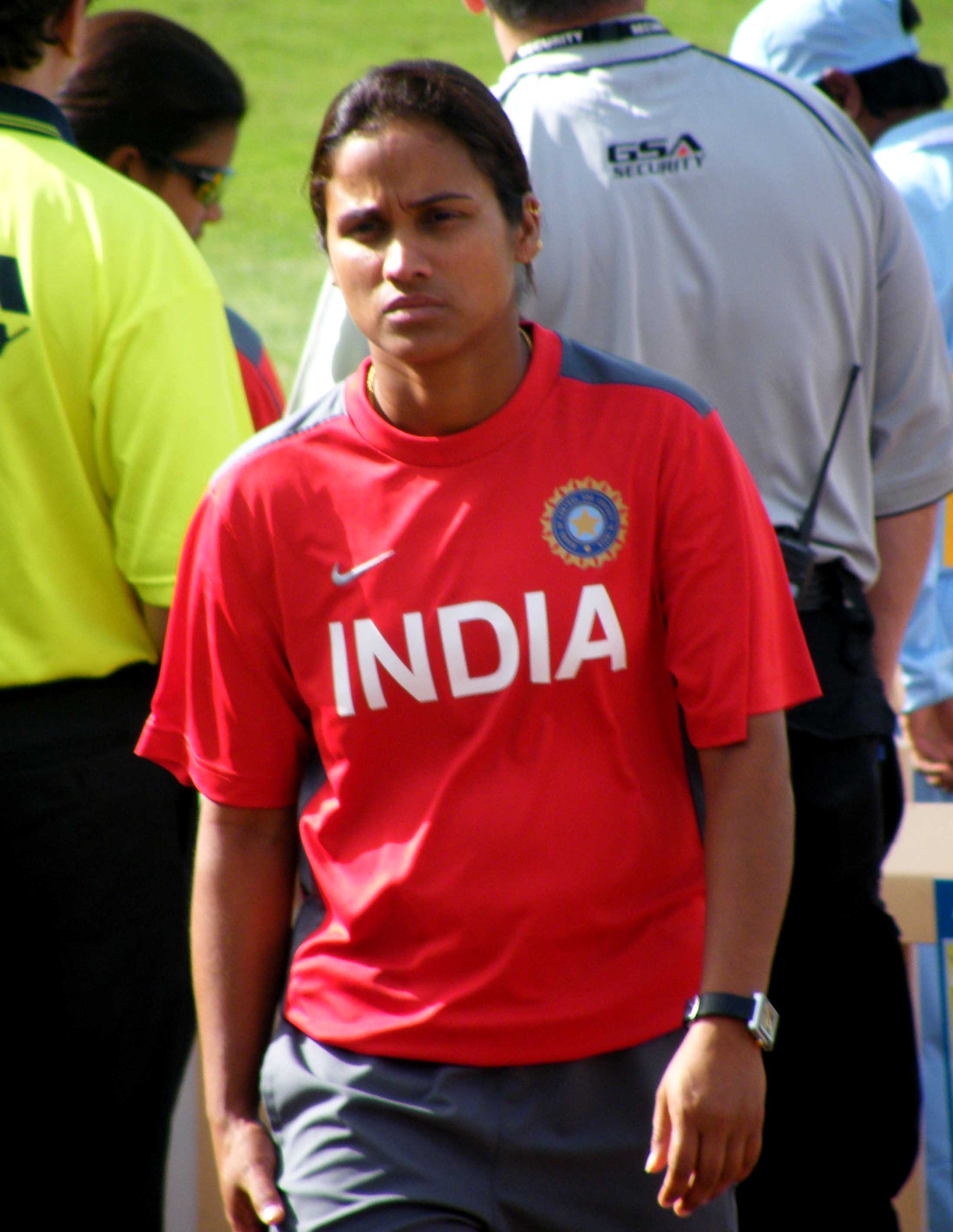
- Amita Sharma in 2009

Personal information
- Full name: Amita Sharma
- Born: 12 September 1982 (age 44); Delhi, India
- Batting: Right-handed
- Bowling: Right-arm medium-fast
- Role: Bowler

International information
- National side: India (2002–2014)
- Test debut (cap 63): 27 November 2003 v New Zealand
- Last Test: 29 August 2006 v England
- ODI debut (cap 68): 24 July 2002 v Ireland
- Last ODI: 23 January 2014 v Sri Lanka
- T20I debut (cap 10): 5 August 2006 v England
- Last T20I: 28 January 2014 v Sri Lanka

Domestic team information
- Years: Team
- 2004/05–2012/13: Railways
- 2013/14: Assam
- 2014/15: Delhi

Career statistics
Competition	WTest	WODI	WT20I	WLA
Matches	5	116	41	230
Runs scored	82	926	383	1,814
Batting average	13.66	16.83	14.73	16.79
100s/50s	0/1	0/1	0/1	0/6
Top score	50	51*	55*	70
Balls bowled	748	4,552	565	9,243
Wickets	5	87	16	201
Bowling average	50.40	32.52	35.25	24.76
5 wickets in innings	0	0	0	0
10 wickets in match	0	0	0	0
Best bowling	2/19	4/16	2/11	4/11
Catches/stumpings	0/–	35/–	8/–	74/–
Medal record
Representing India
Women's cricket
World Cup
Runner-up	2005 South Africa
- Source: CricketArchive, 24 August 2022

Amita Sharma (born 12 September 1982) is an Indian former cricketer and current chairperson of the selection panel of the India women's cricket team. She had played primarily as a right-arm medium-fast bowler. She appeared in five Test matches, 116 One Day Internationals and 41 Twenty20 Internationals for India from 2002 till 2014. She played domestic cricket for Railways, Assam and Delhi.

Sharma first played for India in 2002, and soon established herself as an integral member of the side. She took 14 wickets in the 2005 World Cup in South Africa and helped her side into the final.

In 2012, in a WODI against England, Sharma and Gouher Sultana scored 58 for the 10th wicket, which at the time was the highest 10th-wicket partnership in WODI history.

In September 2025, Sharma was appointed as the chairperson of the selection panel of the India women's cricket team. Under her tenure Indian women cricket team won the Women's World Cup 2025 which held in India.
