= Ireland women's cricket team in India in 2024–25 =

International cricket tour

	India	Ireland
- Dates: 10 – 15 January 2025
Captains	Smriti Mandhana	Gaby Lewis

One Day International series
- Results: India won the 3-match series 3–0
Most runs	Pratika Rawal (310)	Gaby Lewis (105)
Most wickets	Deepti Sharma (7)	Orla Prendergast (4)
- Player of the series: Pratika Rawal (Ind)

The Ireland women's cricket team toured India in January 2025 to play three One Day International (ODI) matches against the India women's cricket team. The series formed part of the 2022–2025 ICC Women's Championship. It was the Ireland women's side's first tour to India and first ever bilateral series between the two sides. In November 2024, Board of Control for Cricket in India (BCCI) confirmed the fixtures for the tour.

India won the first match by six wickets, with Pratika Rawal and Tejal Hasabnis' match winning performance. The hosts won the second match by 116 runs and secured the series 2–0, with Jemimah Rodrigues' maiden ODI century (102) India recorded their highest total in women's ODIs (370). Later it broke in third ODI when India scored 435. With the magnificent maiden century of Pratika Rawal (154) and Smriti Mandhana's 10th and fastest century, India won the final ODI match by 304 run, which was India's biggest margin of victory in terms of runs.

== Squads ==
India	Ireland
Smriti Mandhana (c); Deepti Sharma (vc); Raghvi Bist; Uma Chetry (wk); Harleen Deol; Richa Ghosh (wk); Tejal Hasabnis; Tanuja Kanwar; Minnu Mani; Priya Mishra; Pratika Rawal; Jemimah Rodrigues; Titas Sadhu; Sayali Satghare; Saima Thakor	Gaby Lewis (c); Orla Prendergast (vc); Ava Canning; Christina Coulter Reilly (wk); Alana Dalzell; Laura Delany; Georgina Dempsey; Sarah Forbes; Arlene Kelly; Joanna Loughran (wk); Aimee Maguire; Leah Paul; Una Raymond-Hoey; Freya Sargent; Rebecca Stokell

== ODI series ==
=== 1st ODI ===
10 January 2025
11:00
Scorecard

Ireland; 238/7 (50 overs)	v	India; 241/4 (34.3 overs)
Gaby Lewis 92 (129); Priya Mishra 2/56 (9 overs)		Pratika Rawal 89 (96); Aimee Maguire 3/57 (8 overs)

India won by 6 wickets
Niranjan Shah Stadium, Rajkot
Umpires: Kim Cotton (NZ) and Akshay Totre (Ind)
Player of the match: Pratika Rawal (Ind)

- Ireland won the toss and elected to bat.
- Sayali Satghare (Ind) made her ODI debut.
- Gaby Lewis (Ire) played in her 50th ODI match.
- This was the first women's ODI match to be played at this venue.
- Smriti Mandhana became the fastest Indian women cricketer to score 4,000 runs in ODIs.
- Women's Championship points: India 2, Ireland 0.

=== 2nd ODI ===
12 January 2025
11:00
Scorecard

India; 370/5 (50 overs)	v	Ireland; 254/7 (50 overs)
Jemimah Rodrigues 102 (91); Orla Prendergast 2/75 (8 overs)		Christina Coulter Reilly 80 (113); Deepti Sharma 3/37 (10 overs)

India won by 116 runs
Niranjan Shah Stadium, Rajkot
Umpires: Vrinda Rathi (Ind) and Virender Sharma (Ind)
Player of the match: Jemimah Rodrigues (Ind)

- India won the toss and elected to bat.
- Deepti Sharma (Ind) played in her 100th ODI match.
- Jemimah Rodrigues (Ind) scored her 1,000th run and first century in ODIs.
- Leah Paul (Ire) scored her 1,000th run in ODIs.
- Women's Championship points: India 2, Ireland 0.

=== 3rd ODI ===
15 January 2025
11:00
Scorecard

India; 435/5 (50 overs)	v	Ireland; 131 (31.4 overs)
Pratika Rawal 154 (129); Orla Prendergast 2/71 (8 overs)		Sarah Forbes 41 (44); Deepti Sharma 3/27 (8.4 overs)

India won by 304 runs
Niranjan Shah Stadium, Rajkot
Umpires: Kim Cotton (NZ) and Akshay Totre (Ind)
Player of the match: Pratika Rawal (Ind)

- India won the toss and elected to bat.
- Smriti Mandhana scored fastest century for India in the terms of balls (70) and became the first Indian female cricketer to score 10 centuries in ODIs.
- Pratika Rawal (Ind) scored her first century in ODIs.
- India's total was their highest score in ODIs.
- India registered their highest ever total in ODIs, across the men's and women's.
- This was India's biggest margin of victory (in terms of runs) in women's ODIs.
- Women's Championship points: India 2, Ireland 0.
