= Zimbabwe women's cricket team in India in 2026–27 =

International cricket tour

| | India | Zimbabwe |
- Dates: 16 – 28 October 2026
| Captains | Smriti Mandhana | Josephine Nkomo (Note: Nomvelo Sibanda captained Zimbabwe in the 1st ODI.) |

One Day International series
- Results: India won the 3-match series 3–0
| Most runs | Pratika Rawal (220) | Modester Mupachikwa (111) |
| Most wickets | Vaishnavi Sharma (9) | Nomvelo Sibanda (3) |
- Player of the series: Pratika Rawal (Ind)

Twenty20 International series
- Results: India won the 3-match series 3–0
| Most runs | Shafali Verma (128) | Sharne Mayers (112) |
| Most wickets | Nandini Sharma (6) | Beloved Biza (5) |
- Player of the series: Shafali Verma (Ind)

The Zimbabwe women's cricket team toured India in October 2026 to play the India women's cricket team. The tour consisted of three One Day International (ODI) and three Twenty20 International (WT20I) matches. The ODI series formed part of the 2025–2029 ICC Women's Championship. This was the first-ever bilateral series between the two sides. In May 2026, the Board of Control for Cricket in India (BCCI) confirmed the fixtures for the tour.

== Squads ==
| India | | Zimbabwe | |
| ODIs | T20Is | ODIs | T20Is |
|---|---|---|---|
| Smriti Mandhana (c); Deepti Sharma (vc); Yastika Bhatia (wk); Shree Charani; Harleen Deol; Kranti Gaud; Richa Ghosh (wk); Tejal Hasabnis; Harmanpreet Kaur; Pratika Rawal; Sayali Satghare; Nandani Sharma; Vaishnavi Sharma; Renuka Singh; Shafali Verma | Smriti Mandhana (c); Shafali Verma (vc); Shree Charani; Kranti Gaud; Richa Ghosh (wk); Jintimani Kalita; Gunalan Kamalini (wk); Harmanpreet Kaur; Minnu Mani; Niki Prasad; Prema Rawat; Arundhati Reddy; Anushka Sharma; Deepti Sharma; Nandani Sharma | Josephine Nkomo (c); Beloved Biza; Olinder Chare; Kudzai Chigora; Francisca Chipare; Chiedza Dhururu (wk); Nyasha Gwanzura; Tendai Makusha; Michelle Mavunga; Sharne Mayers; Chipo Mugeri-Tiripano; Modester Mupachikwa (wk); Kelis Ndhlovu; Loryn Phiri; Nomvelo Sibanda | Josephine Nkomo (c); Beloved Biza; Olinder Chare; Kudzai Chigora; Francisca Chipare; Chiedza Dhururu (wk); Nyasha Gwanzura; Tendai Makusha; Michelle Mavunga; Sharne Mayers; Chipo Mugeri-Tiripano; Modester Mupachikwa (wk); Kelis Ndhlovu; Loryn Phiri; Nomvelo Sibanda |

== T20I series ==
=== 1st T20I ===
16 October 2026
19:00 (N)
Scorecard

| Zimbabwe; 114/5 (20 overs) | v | India; 116/6 (15.4 overs) |
| Sharne Mayers 43* (33); Nandani Sharma 2/11 (4 overs) | | Deepti Sharma 49 (37); Nyasha Gwanzura 3/18 (3 overs) |

India won by 4 wickets
Shaheed Veer Narayan Singh International Cricket Stadium, Raipur
Umpires: Anna Harris (Eng) and Vrinda Rathi (Ind)
Player of the match: Deepti Sharma (Ind)

- India won the toss and elected to field.
- India and Zimbabwe met for the first time in WT20Is.
- This was the first women's T20I match to be played at this venue.
- Niki Prasad (Ind) made her T20I debut.

=== 2nd T20I ===
18 October 2026
19:00 (N)
Scorecard

| Zimbabwe; 102/8 (20 overs) | v | India; 104/1 (8.5 overs) |
| Chipo Mugeri-Tiripano 34 (32); Niki Prasad 2/7 (2 overs) | | Shafali Verma 55 (25); Beloved Biza 1/9 (1 over) |

India won by 9 wickets
Shaheed Veer Narayan Singh International Cricket Stadium, Raipur
Umpires: Vrinda Rathi (Ind) and Gayathri Venugopalan (Ind)
Player of the match: Shafali Verma (Ind)

- Zimbabwe won the toss and elected to bat.

=== 3rd T20I ===
20 October 2026
19:00 (N)
Scorecard

| India; 216/7 (20 overs) | v | Zimbabwe; 124/7 (20 overs) |
| Harmanpreet Kaur 91* (41); Beloved Biza 3/50 (4 overs) | | Sharne Mayers 60 (49); Nandani Sharma 3/18 (4 overs) |

India won by 92 runs
Shaheed Veer Narayan Singh International Cricket Stadium, Raipur
Umpires: Anna Harris (Eng) and Narayanan Janani (Ind)
Player of the match: Harmanpreet Kaur (Ind)

- India won the toss and elected to bat.

== ODI series ==
=== 1st ODI ===
23 October 2026
14:00 (D/N)
Scorecard

| Zimbabwe; 197 (49.5 overs) | v | India; 200/1 (27.1 overs) |
| Beloved Biza 62 (92); Shree Charani 4/23 (10 overs) | | Pratika Rawal 100* (96); Olinder Chare 1/58 (7 overs) |

India won by 9 wickets
Baroda Cricket Association Stadium, Vadodara
Umpires: Anna Harris (Eng) and Gayathri Venugopalan (Ind)
Player of the match: Pratika Rawal (Ind)

- Zimbabwe won the toss and elected to bat.
- India and Zimbabwe met for the first time in WODIs.
- Jintimani Kalita (Ind) made her ODI debut.
- Women's Championship points: India 2, Zimbabwe 0.

=== 2nd ODI ===
25 October 2026
14:00 (D/N)
Scorecard

| India; 328/6 (50 overs) | v | Zimbabwe; 207 (48.5 runs) |
| Harmanpreet Kaur 126 (121); Nomvelo Sibanda 2/38 (4 overs) | | Modester Mupachikwa 49 (70); Vaishnavi Sharma 4/39 (10 overs) |

India won by 121 runs
Baroda Cricket Association Stadium, Vadodara
Umpires: Ankita Guha (Ind) and Gayathri Venugopalan (Ind)
Player of the match: Harmanpreet Kaur (Ind)

- India won the toss and elected to bat.
- Women's Championship points: India 2, Zimbabwe 0.

=== 3rd ODI ===
28 October 2026
14:00 (D/N)
Scorecard

| Zimbabwe; 131 (39.5 overs) | v | India; 133/2 (17 overs) |
| Modester Mupachikwa 37 (48); Vaishnavi Sharma 5/39 (10 overs) | | Pratika Rawal 59* (56); Nomvelo Sibanda 1/18 (3 overs) |

India won by 8 wickets
Baroda Cricket Association Stadium, Vadodara
Umpires: Anna Harris (Eng) and Narayanan Janani (Ind)
Player of the match: Vaishnavi Sharma (Ind)

- Zimbabwe won the toss and elected to bat.
- Vaishnavi Sharma (Ind) took her maiden five-wicket haul in ODIs.
- Women's Championship points: India 2, Zimbabwe 0.
