= India women's cricket team in Australia in 2024–25 =

International cricket tour

	Australia	India
- Dates: 5 – 11 December 2024
Captains	Tahlia McGrath	Harmanpreet Kaur

One Day International series
- Results: Australia won the 3-match series 3–0
Most runs	Georgia Voll (173)	Smriti Mandhana (122)
Most wickets	Megan Schutt (8)	Arundhati Reddy (4); Renuka Singh Thakur (4)
- Player of the series: Annabel Sutherland (Aus)

The India women's cricket team toured Australia in December 2024 to play three One Day International (ODI) matches against Australia women's cricket team. The series formed part of the 2022–2025 ICC Women's Championship. In March 2024, the Cricket Australia (CA) confirmed the fixtures for the tour, as a part of the 2024–25 home international season. The series was run alongside the men's Test series between Australia and India.

== Squads ==
Australia	India
Tahlia McGrath (c); Ashleigh Gardner (vc); Darcie Brown; Kim Garth; Alana King; Phoebe Litchfield; Sophie Molineux; Beth Mooney (wk); Ellyse Perry; Megan Schutt; Annabel Sutherland; Georgia Voll; Georgia Wareham	Harmanpreet Kaur (c); Smriti Mandhana (vc); ~~Yastika Bhatia (wk)~~; Uma Chetry (wk); Harleen Deol; Richa Ghosh (wk); Tejal Hasabnis; Minnu Mani; Priya Mishra; Priya Punia; Arundhati Reddy; Jemimah Rodrigues; Titas Sadhu; Deepti Sharma; Saima Thakor; Renuka Singh Thakur; Radha Yadav

On 27 November, Yastika Bhatia was ruled out of the series due to wrist injury, with Uma Chetry named as her replacement. On 11 December, Priya Punia was ruled out of the third ODI with a left knee injury.

== A team series ==
India A toured Australia in August 2024 to play the Australia A. The tour consisted of one unofficial Test, three unofficial ODI and three unofficial T20I matches.

=== Squads ===
Australia A		India A
Unofficial Test	Unofficial ODIs and T20Is	Unofficial Test, ODIs and T20Is
Tahlia McGrath (c); Charli Knott (vc); Maitlan Brown; Maddy Darke; Sophie Day; Nicole Faltum (wk); Tess Flintoff; Katie Mack; Grace Parsons; Kate Peterson; Courtney Sippel; Tayla Vlaeminck; Tahlia Wilson	Charli Knott (c); Nicole Faltum (vc, wk); Maitlan Brown; Maddy Darke (wk); Sophie Day; Emma de Broughe; Tess Flintoff; Katie Mack; Lilly Mills; Grace Parsons; Kate Peterson; Courtney Sippel; Georgia Voll	Minnu Mani (c); Shweta Sehrawat (vc); Raghvi Bist; Uma Chetry (wk); Shipra Giri (wk); Tejal Hasabnis; Saika Ishaque; Tanuja Kanwar; Mannat Kashyap; Priya Mishra; Kiran Navgire; Priya Punia; Sajeevan Sajana; Sayali Satghare; Shubha Satheesh; Shabnam Shakil; Meghna Singh; Soppadhandi Yashasri

Saima Thakor was named as travelling reserve.

Cricket Australia announced their Australia A squad in early July 2024, naming Tahlia McGrath as their white ball captain and Charli Knott named red ball captain.

Board of Control for Cricket in India announced India A squad in July 2024, naming Minnu Mani as the side's captain along with Shweta Sehrawat as the vice-captain.

=== A team 20-over series ===
==== 1st 20-over match ====
7 August 2024
13:00
Scorecard

Australia A 5/163 (20 overs)	v	India A 6/158 (20 overs)
Tahlia Wilson 50 (34); Saika Ishaque 3/33 (4 overs)		Priya Punia 76 (59); Maitlan Brown 2/30 (4 overs)

Australia A won by 5 runs
Allan Border Field, Brisbane
Umpires: Stephen Dionysius (Aus) and Roberto Howard (Aus)

- India A won the toss and elected to field.

==== 2nd 20-over match ====
9 August 2024
13:00
Scorecard

India A 9/130 (20 overs)	v	Australia A 2/133 (18.2 overs)
Priya Punia 29 (26); Grace Parsons 4/30 (4 overs)		Tahlia Wilson 53* (46); Minnu Mani 1/22 (4 overs)

Australia A won by 8 wickets
Allan Border Field, Brisbane
Umpires: Daryl Brigham (Aus) and Stephen Dionysius (Aus)

- Australia A won the toss and elected to field.

==== 3rd 20-over match ====
11 August 2024
13:00
Scorecard

India A 8/120 (20 overs)	v	Australia A 3/121 (13.5 overs)
Kiran Navgire 38 (20); Grace Parsons 2/18 (4 overs)		Tahlia McGrath 51* (22); Minnu Mani 1/20 (3 overs)

Australia A won by 7 wickets
Allan Border Field, Brisbane
Umpires: Daryl Brigham (Aus) and Roberto Howard (Aus)

- Australia A won the toss and elected to field.

=== A team 50-over series ===
==== 1st 50-over match ====
14 August 2024
09:30
Scorecard

India A 9/249 (50 overs)	v	Australia A 6/250 (47 overs)
Raghvi Bist 82 (110); Maitlan Brown 4/23 (6 overs)		Katie Mack 129 (126); Meghna Singh 2/43 (9 overs)

Australia A won by 4 wickets
Great Barrier Reef Arena, Mackay
Umpires: Troy Penman (Aus) and David Taylor (Aus)

- Australia A won the toss and elected to field.

==== 2nd 50-over match ====
16 August 2024
13:20 (D/N)
Scorecard

India A 218 (48 overs)	v	Australia A 2/221 (40.2 overs)
Raghvi Bist 70* (93); Nicola Hancock 2/27 (7 overs)		Maddy Darke 106* (115); Sayali Satghare 1/41 (9 overs)

Australia A won by 8 wickets
Great Barrier Reef Arena, Mackay
Umpires: Troy Penman (Aus) and David Taylor (Aus)

- Australia A won the toss and elected to field.

==== 3rd 50-over match ====
18 August 2024
13:20 (D/N)
Scorecard

India A 9/243 (50 overs)	v	Australia A 72 (22.1 overs)
Raghvi Bist 53 (64); Maitlan Brown 3/39 (6 overs)		Maddy Darke 22 (34); Priya Mishra 5/14 (5 overs)

India A won by 171 runs
Great Barrier Reef Arena, Mackay
Umpires: Troy Penman (Aus) and David Taylor (Aus)

- Australia A won the toss and elected to field.

=== Only Unofficial Test ===
22–25 August 2024
Scorecard

Australia A	v	India A
212 (65.5 overs); Georgia Voll 71 (95); Minnu Mani 5/58 (21 overs)		184 (73.1 overs); Shweta Sehrawat 40* (109); Kate Peterson 5/16 (12 overs)
260 (92 overs); Maddy Darke 105* (197); Minnu Mani 6/92 (31 overs)		243 (92.5 overs); Uma Chetry 47 (80); Charli Knott 3/34 (17.5 overs)

Australia A won by 45 runs
Kerrydale Oval, Gold Coast
Umpires: Drew Crozier (Aus) and Simon Lightboy (Aus)

- Australia A won the toss and elected to bat.

== ODI series ==
=== 1st ODI ===
5 December 2024
14:20 (D/N)
Scorecard

India; 100 (34.2 overs)	v	Australia; 5/102 (16.2 overs)
Jemimah Rodrigues 23 (42); Megan Schutt 5/19 (6.2 overs)		Georgia Voll 46* (42); Renuka Singh Thakur 3/45 (7 overs)

Australia won by 5 wickets
Allan Border Field, Brisbane
Umpires: Donovan Koch (Aus) and Jacqueline Williams (WI)
Player of the match: Megan Schutt (Aus)

- India won the toss and elected to bat.
- Georgia Voll (Aus) and Titas Sadhu (Ind) both made their ODI debuts.
- Megan Schutt (Aus) took her first five-wicket haul in ODIs.
- Women's Championship points: Australia 2, India 0.

=== 2nd ODI ===
8 December 2024
09:45
Scorecard

Australia; 8/371 (50 overs)	v	India; 249 (44.5 overs)
Ellyse Perry 105 (75); Saima Thakor 3/62 (10 overs)		Richa Ghosh 54 (72); Annabel Sutherland 4/39 (8.5 overs)

Australia won by 122 runs
Allan Border Field, Brisbane
Umpires: Donovan Koch (Aus) and Claire Polosak (Aus)
Player of the match: Ellyse Perry (Aus)

- Australia won the toss and elected to bat.
- Minnu Mani (Ind) made her ODI debut.
- Georgia Voll (Aus) scored her first century in ODIs.
- Ellyse Perry (Aus) scored her 4,000th run in ODIs.
- Australia's total was the largest ever conceded by India in a women's ODI.
- Women's Championship points: Australia 2, India 0.

=== 3rd ODI ===
11 December 2024
12:20 (D/N)
Scorecard

Australia; 6/298 (50 overs)	v	India; 215 (45.1 overs)
Annabel Sutherland 110 (95); Arundhati Reddy 4/26 (10 overs)		Smriti Mandhana 105 (109); Ashleigh Gardner 5/30 (10 overs)

Australia won by 83 runs
WACA Ground, Perth
Umpires: Claire Polosak (Aus) and Jacqueline Williams (WI)
Player of the match: Annabel Sutherland (Aus)

- India won the toss and elected to field.
- Ellyse Perry (Aus) played in her 150th ODI match.
- Smriti Mandhana (Ind) scored her 8,000th run in international cricket.
- Women's Championship points: Australia 2, India 0.
