= West Indies women's cricket team in India in 2024–25 =

International cricket tour

	India	West Indies
- Dates: 15 – 27 December 2024
Captains	Harmanpreet Kaur (Note: Smriti Mandhana captained India in the 2nd and 3rd T20Is.)	Hayley Matthews

One Day International series
- Results: India won the 3-match series 3–0
Most runs	Harleen Deol (160)	Hayley Matthews (106)
Most wickets	Renuka Singh Thakur (10)	Zaida James (6)
- Player of the series: Renuka Singh Thakur (Ind)

Twenty20 International series
- Results: India won the 3-match series 2–1
Most runs	Smriti Mandhana (193)	Hayley Matthews (108)
Most wickets	Radha Yadav (6)	Deandra Dottin (4)
- Player of the series: Smriti Mandhana (Ind)

The West Indies women's cricket team toured India in December 2024 to play the India women's cricket team. The tour consisted of three One Day International (ODI) and three Twenty20 International (T20I) matches. The ODI series formed part of the 2022–2025 ICC Women's Championship. In November 2024, Board of Control for Cricket in India (BCCI) confirmed the fixtures for the tour.

India won the first T20I by 49 runs with the help of half-centuries from Jemimah Rodrigues (73) and Smriti Mandhana. West Indies won the second T20I by 9 wickets with a match winning knock from Hayley Matthews (85) and levelled the series. The hosts scored their highest total in women's T20Is (217) and won the third and last T20I by 60 runs, with Smriti Mandhana's match winning half century (77) and Richa Ghosh's joint-fastest (18 ball) half century (54) and won the series 2–1.

The hosts won the first ODI by 211 runs with the Smriti Mandhana's 91 run match winning innings and a maiden fifer of Renuka Singh Thakur (5-29). From the West Indies side Zaida James took her first fifer in international cricket. This was India's second biggest win, in terms of runs, in women's ODIs. In the second ODI India recorded their joint-highest total in women's ODIs. Despite a century by Hayley Matthews (106), India won the second game by 115 runs, with Harleen Deol playing a magnificent innings of 115 off 103 and Pratika Rawal's 76 off 86. India won the third and last ODI by 5 wickets and swept the series 3–0, with the Deepti Sharma's all-round performance. She took a six-wicket haul (6-31) and scored unbeaten 39 off 48.

== Squads ==
India		West Indies
ODIs	T20Is	ODIs & T20Is
Harmanpreet Kaur (c); Smriti Mandhana (vc); Uma Chetry (wk); Harleen Deol; Richa Ghosh (wk); Tejal Hasabnis; Tanuja Kanwar; Minnu Mani; Priya Mishra; Pratika Rawal; Jemimah Rodrigues; Titas Sadhu; Deepti Sharma; Saima Thakor; Renuka Singh Thakur	Harmanpreet Kaur (c); Smriti Mandhana (vc); Raghvi Bist; Uma Chetry (wk); Richa Ghosh (wk); Nandini Kashyap; Minnu Mani; Priya Mishra; Jemimah Rodrigues; Titas Sadhu; Sajeevan Sajana; Deepti Sharma; Saima Thakor; Renuka Singh Thakur; Radha Yadav	Hayley Matthews (c); Shemaine Campbelle (vc, wk); Aaliyah Alleyne; Shamilia Connell; Nerissa Crafton; Deandra Dottin; Afy Fletcher; Shabika Gajnabi; Chinelle Henry; Zaida James; Qiana Joseph; Mandy Mangru; Ashmini Munisar; Karishma Ramharack; Rashada Williams (wk)

== T20I series ==
=== 1st T20I ===
15 December 2024
19:00 (N)
Scorecard

India; 195/4 (20 overs)	v	West Indies; 146/7 (20 overs)
Jemimah Rodrigues 73 (35); Karishma Ramharack 2/18 (4 overs)		Deandra Dottin 55 (28); Titas Sadhu 3/37 (4 overs)

India won by 49 runs
DY Patil Stadium, Navi Mumbai
Umpires: Kaushik Gandhi (Ind) and Eloise Sheridan (Aus)
Player of the match: Jemimah Rodrigues (Ind)

- West Indies won the toss and elected to field.
- Saima Thakor (Ind) made her T20I debut.

=== 2nd T20I ===
17 December 2024
19:00 (N)
Scorecard

India; 159/9 (20 overs)	v	West Indies; 160/1 (15.4 overs)
Smriti Mandhana 62 (41); Deandra Dottin 2/14 (4 overs)		Hayley Matthews 85* (47); Saima Thakor 1/28 (3 overs)

West Indies won by 9 wickets
DY Patil Stadium, Navi Mumbai
Umpires: Kaushik Gandhi (Ind) and Mohit Krishnadas (Ind)
Player of the match: Hayley Matthews (WI)

- West Indies won the toss and elected to field.
- Raghvi Bist (Ind) and Nerissa Crafton (WI) both made their T20I debuts.

=== 3rd T20I ===
19 December 2024
19:00 (N)
Scorecard

India; 217/4 (20 overs)	v	West Indies; 157/9 (20 overs)
Smriti Mandhana 77 (47); Chinelle Henry 1/14 (2 overs)		Chinelle Henry 43 (16); Radha Yadav 4/29 (4 overs)

India won by 60 runs
DY Patil Stadium, Navi Mumbai
Umpires: Mohit Krishnadas (Ind) and Eloise Sheridan (Aus)
Player of the match: Richa Ghosh (Ind)

- West Indies won the toss and elected to field.
- This was India's highest total in women's T20Is.
- Richa Ghosh (Ind) scored the joint-fastest fifty in women's T20Is (off 18 balls).

== ODI series ==
=== 1st ODI ===
22 December 2024
13:30 (D/N)
Scorecard

India; 314/9 (50 overs)	v	West Indies; 103 (26.2 overs)
Smriti Mandhana 91 (102); Zaida James 5/45 (8 overs)		Afy Fletcher 24* (22); Renuka Singh Thakur 5/29 (10 overs)

India won by 211 runs
Baroda Cricket Association Stadium, Vadodara
Umpires: Eloise Sheridan (Aus) and Kannur Swaroopanand (Ind)
Player of the match: Renuka Singh Thakur (Ind)

- West Indies won the toss and elected to field.
- Pratika Rawal (Ind) made her ODI debut.
- This was the first women's ODI match to be played at this venue.
- Zaida James (WI) and Renuka Singh Thakur (Ind) both took their first five-wicket haul in ODIs.
- Women's Championship points: India 2, West Indies 0.

=== 2nd ODI ===
24 December 2024
13:30 (D/N)
Scorecard

India; 358/5 (50 overs)	v	West Indies; 243 (46.2 overs)
Harleen Deol 115 (103); Qiana Joseph 1/27 (2 overs)		Hayley Matthews 106 (109); Priya Mishra 3/49 (9.2 overs)

India won by 115 runs
Baroda Cricket Association Stadium, Vadodara
Umpires: Jayaraman Madanagopal (Ind) and Kannur Swaroopanand (Ind)
Player of the match: Harleen Deol (Ind)

- India won the toss and elected to bat.
- Nerissa Crafton (WI) made her ODI debut.
- Harleen Deol (Ind) scored her first century in ODIs.
- Women's Championship points: India 2, West Indies 0.

=== 3rd ODI ===
27 December 2024
09:30
Scorecard

West Indies; 162 (38.5 overs)	v	India; 167/5 (28.2 overs)
Chinelle Henry 61 (72); Deepti Sharma 6/31 (10 overs)		Deepti Sharma 39* (48); Deandra Dottin 1/27 (5 overs)

India won by 5 wickets
Baroda Cricket Association Stadium, Vadodara
Umpires: Eloise Sheridan (Aus) and Kannur Swaroopanand (Ind)
Player of the match: Deepti Sharma (Ind)

- West Indies won the toss and elected to bat.
- Tanuja Kanwar (Ind) made her ODI debut.
- Women's Championship points: India 2, West Indies 0.
