= India women's cricket team in South Africa in 2026–27 =

International cricket tour

	South Africa	India
- Dates: 9 – 30 December 2026
Captains		Smriti Mandhana

Test series

One Day International series

Twenty20 International series

The India women's cricket team is scheduled to tour South Africa in December 2026 to play the South Africa women's cricket team. The tour will consist of one Test, three ODI and three Twenty20 International (T20I) matches. The ODI series will form part of the 2025–2029 ICC Women's Championship. In March 2026, Cricket South Africa (CSA) confirmed the fixtures for the tour, as part of the 2026 home international season.

The tour was originally supposed to include only one Test and three ODIs. In August 2026, three T20Is were added to the tour, to allow the teams preparation for the 2027 ICC Women's Champions Trophy.

== Squads ==
South Africa			India		
Test	ODIs	T20Is	Test	ODIs	T20Is
			Smriti Mandhana (c); Deepti Sharma (vc); Yastika Bhatia (wk); Shree Charani; Harleen Deol; Kranti Gaud; Richa Ghosh (wk); Jintimani Kalita; Harmanpreet Kaur; Sneh Rana; Pratika Rawal; Jemimah Rodrigues; Sayali Satghare; Nandani Sharma; Shafali Verma	Smriti Mandhana (c); Deepti Sharma (vc); Yastika Bhatia (wk); Shree Charani; Harleen Deol; Kranti Gaud; Richa Ghosh (wk); Jintimani Kalita; Harmanpreet Kaur; Pratika Rawal; Jemimah Rodrigues; Sayali Satghare; Nandani Sharma; Vaishnavi Sharma; Shafali Verma	Smriti Mandhana (c); Shafali Verma (vc); Shree Charani; Kranti Gaud; Richa Ghosh (wk); G. Kamalini (wk); Amanjot Kaur; Harmanpreet Kaur; Niki Prasad; Prema Rawat; Arundhati Reddy; Jemimah Rodrigues; Sayali Satghare; Anushka Sharma; Deepti Sharma; Nandani Sharma; Renuka Singh

== Only Test ==
9–12 December 2026
Scorecard

South Africa	v	India

St George's Park Cricket Ground, Gqeberha

== ODI series ==
=== 1st ODI ===
16 December 2026
Scorecard

South Africa	v	India

Boland Park, Paarl

=== 2nd ODI ===
19 December 2026 (D/N)
Scorecard

South Africa	v	India

Newlands Cricket Ground, Cape Town

=== 3rd ODI ===
22 December 2026 (D/N)
Scorecard

South Africa	v	India

Maunguang Oval, Bloemfontein

== T20I series ==
=== 1st T20I ===
26 December 2026 (N)
Scorecard

South Africa	v	India

Willowmoore Park, Benoni

=== 2nd T20I ===
29 December 2026 (N)
Scorecard

South Africa	v	India

JB Marks Oval, Potchefstroom

=== 3rd T20I ===
30 December 2026 (N)
Scorecard

South Africa	v	India

JB Marks Oval, Potchefstroom
