= Australia women's cricket team in India in 2025–26 =

International cricket tour

	India	Australia
- Dates: 14 – 20 September 2025
Captains	Harmanpreet Kaur	Alyssa Healy

One Day International series
- Results: Australia won the 3-match series 2–1
Most runs	Smriti Mandhana (300)	Beth Mooney (233)
Most wickets	Kranti Goud (5)	Megan Schutt (5)
- Player of the series: Smriti Mandhana (Ind)

The Australia women's cricket team toured India in September 2025 to play the India women's cricket team. The tour consisted of three One Day International (ODI) matches. The series formed part of both teams' preparation ahead of the 2025 Women's Cricket World Cup tournament. In May 2025, the Board of Control for Cricket in India (BCCI) confirmed the fixtures for the tour.

The venue for the 1st and 2nd ODI was updated to New Chandigarh and for the 3rd ODI was updated to New Delhi from Chennai in June 2025.

== Squads ==
India	Australia
Harmanpreet Kaur (c); Smriti Mandhana (vc); ~~Yastika Bhatia (wk)~~; Shree Charani; Uma Chetry (wk); Harleen Deol; Richa Ghosh (wk); Kranti Goud; Tejal Hasabnis; Sneh Rana; Pratika Rawal; Arundhati Reddy; Jemimah Rodrigues; Sayali Satghare; Deepti Sharma; Renuka Singh Thakur; Radha Yadav	Alyssa Healy (c, wk); Tahlia McGrath (vc); Darcie Brown; Nicole Faltum (wk); Ashleigh Gardner; Kim Garth; Grace Harris; Alana King; Charli Knott; Phoebe Litchfield; Sophie Molineux; Beth Mooney (wk); Ellyse Perry; Megan Schutt; Annabel Sutherland; Georgia Voll; Georgia Wareham

On 4 September, Yastika Bhatia was ruled out of the series due to a left knee injury and was replaced by Uma Chetry. On 17 September, Jemimah Rodrigues was ruled out of the remainder of the series due to a viral fever, and she was replaced by Tejal Hasabnis.

== ODI series ==
=== 1st ODI ===
14 September 2025
13:30 (D/N)
Scorecard

India; 281/7 (50 overs)	v	Australia; 282/2 (44.1 overs)
Pratika Rawal 64 (96); Megan Schutt 2/45 (7 overs)		Phoebe Litchfield 88 (80); Sneh Rana 1/51 (10 overs)

Australia won by 8 wickets
Maharaja Yadavindra Singh International Cricket Stadium, New Chandigarh
Umpires: Lauren Agenbag (SA) and Gayathri Venugopalan (Ind)
Player of the match: Phoebe Litchfield (Aus)

- India won the toss and elected to bat.
- This was the first women's ODI to be played at this venue.
- Harmanpreet Kaur (Ind) played in her 150th ODI match.
- Megan Schutt (Aus) played in her 100th ODI match.

=== 2nd ODI ===
17 September 2025
13:30 (D/N)
Scorecard

India; 292 (49.5 overs)	v	Australia; 190 (40.5 overs)
Smriti Mandhana 117 (91); Darcie Brown 3/42 (8 overs)		Annabel Sutherland 45 (42); Kranti Goud 3/28 (9.5 overs)

India won by 102 runs
Maharaja Yadavindra Singh International Cricket Stadium, New Chandigarh
Umpires: Narayanan Janani (Ind) and Vrinda Rathi (Ind)
Player of the match: Smriti Mandhana (Ind)

- Australia won the toss and elected to field.
- India recorded their highest total against Australia in women's ODIs.
- This was India's first ODI win against Australia at home after 18 years.
- This was Australia's biggest defeat (in terms of runs) in women's ODIs.

=== 3rd ODI ===
20 September 2025
13:30 (D/N)
Scorecard

Australia; 412 (47.5 overs)	v	India; 369 (47 overs)
Beth Mooney 138 (75); Arundhati Reddy 3/86 (8.5 overs)		Smriti Mandhana 125 (63); Kim Garth 3/69 (9 overs)

Australia won by 43 runs
Arun Jaitley Cricket Stadium, New Delhi
Umpires: Lauren Agenbag (SA) and Narayanan Janani (Ind)
Player of the match: Beth Mooney (Aus)

- Australia won the toss and elected to bat.
- Radha Yadav (Ind) played in her 100th international match.
- Smriti Mandhana scored fastest century for India, across the men's and women's, in the terms of balls (50) and scored second-fastest century in women's ODIs.
- Harmanpreet Kaur (Ind) scored her 8,000th run in international cricket.
- Megan Schutt (Aus) took her 300th wickets in international cricket.
- This match recorded the highest aggregate runs in a women's ODIs (781), surpassing the previous record of 678 set by England and South Africa in 2017.
- India recorded their highest total against Australia and became the first team to score 300+ runs against Australia in women's ODIs.
