= New Zealand women's cricket team in India in 2024–25 =

International cricket tour

| | India | New Zealand |
- Dates: 24 – 29 October 2024
| Captains | Harmanpreet Kaur (Note: Smriti Mandhana captained India in the first ODI.) | Sophie Devine |

One Day International series
- Results: India won the 3-match series 2–1
| Most runs | Smriti Mandhana (105) | Brooke Halliday (133) |
| Most wickets | Radha Yadav (7) | Jess Kerr (5) |
- Player of the series: Deepti Sharma (Ind)

The New Zealand women's cricket team toured India in October 2024 to play three One Day International (ODI) matches against India women's cricket team. The series formed part of the 2022–2025 ICC Women's Championship. The series was run alongside the men's Test series between India and New Zealand. All the matches were played at the Narendra Modi Stadium in Ahmedabad. In October 2024, the Board of Control for Cricket in India (BCCI) confirmed the fixtures for the tour.

India won the first ODI by 59 runs, with the debutant Tejal Hasabnis scoring 42 runs, Saima Thakor picked two wickets and Deepti Sharma's all round performance. The tourists won the second ODI by 76 runs and leveled the series, with Sophie Devine's all round performance (scoring 79 and taking 3 wickets) and India lost the game despite Radha Yadav taking four wickets and scoring a career best 48 runs. The hosts won the third and final ODI by 6 wickets, with Smriti Mandhana scoring her 8th ODI century and won the series 2–1.

== Background ==
Originally, the series was scheduled to take place in 2023 with three ODIs and three T20Is. However, it was postponed due to the 2023 Cricket World Cup in India and Indian women team's packed schedule, which included series against England and Australia. A T20I series was also originally part of the Future Tours Programme but it was rescheduled to only a three-ODI series.

== Squads ==
| India | New Zealand |
|---|---|
| Harmanpreet Kaur (c); Smriti Mandhana (vc); Yastika Bhatia (wk); Uma Chetry (wk); Tejal Hasabnis; Dayalan Hemalatha; Priya Mishra; Shreyanka Patil; Arundhati Reddy; Jemimah Rodrigues; Sayali Satghare; Deepti Sharma; Saima Thakor; Renuka Singh Thakur; Shafali Verma; Radha Yadav | Sophie Devine (c); Suzie Bates; Eden Carson; Lauren Down; Izzy Gaze (wk); Maddy Green; Brooke Halliday; Polly Inglis (wk); Fran Jonas; Amelia Kerr; Jess Kerr; Molly Penfold; Georgia Plimmer; Hannah Rowe; Lea Tahuhu |

On 26 October, Amelia Kerr was ruled out of the rest of the series after tearing her left quadricep muscle.

== ODI series ==
=== 1st ODI ===
24 October 2024
13:30 (D/N)
Scorecard

| India; 227 (44.3 overs) | v | New Zealand; 168 (40.4 overs) |
| Tejal Hasabnis 42 (64); Amelia Kerr 4/42 (9 overs) | | Brooke Halliday 39 (54); Radha Yadav 3/35 (8.4 overs) |

India won by 59 runs
Narendra Modi Stadium, Ahmedabad
Umpires: Rohan Pandit (Ind) and Claire Polosak (Aus)
Player of the match: Deepti Sharma (Ind)

- India won the toss and elected to bat.
- Tejal Hasabnis and Saima Thakor (Ind) both made their ODI debuts.
- Women's Championship Points: India 2, New Zealand 0.

=== 2nd ODI ===
27 October 2024
13:30 (D/N)
Scorecard

| New Zealand; 259/9 (50 overs) | v | India; 183 (47.1 overs) |
| Sophie Devine 79 (86); Radha Yadav 4/69 (10 overs) | | Radha Yadav 48 (64); Sophie Devine 3/27 (7.1 overs) |

New Zealand won by 76 runs
Narendra Modi Stadium, Ahmedabad
Umpires: Vrinda Rathi (Ind) and Gayathri Venugopalan (Ind)
Player of the match: Sophie Devine (NZ)

- New Zealand won the toss and elected to bat.
- Priya Mishra (Ind) made her ODI debut.
- The partnership between Radha Yadav and Saima Thakor (70 run) was the highest 9th-wicket partnership for India in women's ODIs.
- Women's Championship Points: New Zealand 2, India 0.

=== 3rd ODI ===
29 October 2024
13:30 (D/N)
Scorecard

| New Zealand; 232 (49.5 overs) | v | India; 236/4 (44.2 overs) |
| Brooke Halliday 86 (96); Deepti Sharma 3/39 (10 overs) | | Smriti Mandhana 100 (122); Hannah Rowe 2/47 (8 overs) |

India won by 6 wickets
Narendra Modi Stadium, Ahmedabad
Umpires: Claire Polosak (Aus) and Vrinda Rathi (Ind)
Player of the match: Smriti Mandhana (Ind)

- New Zealand won the toss and elected to bat.
- Women's Championship Points: India 2, New Zealand 0.
