= Ritu Dhrub =

Indian cricketer (born 1994)

Personal information
- Full name: Ritu Ajit Dhrub
- Born: 16 October 1994 (age 32); Delhi, India
- Batting: Right-handed
- Bowling: Right-arm offbreak
- Role: Bowler

International information
- National side: India
- ODI debut (cap 104): 8 April 2013 v Bangladesh
- Last ODI: 12 April 2013 v Bangladesh
- T20I debut (cap 37): 2 April 2013 v Bangladesh
- Last T20I: 5 April 2013 v Bangladesh

Domestic team information
- Years: Team
- 2008/09–2014/15: Assam

Career statistics
Competition	ODI	T20I
Matches	3	3
Runs scored	2	2
Batting average	2.00	–
100s/50s	0/0	0/0
Top score	2	2*
Balls bowled	126	48
Wickets	2	1
Bowling average	33.50	42.00
5 wickets in innings	0	0
10 wickets in match	0	0
Best bowling	1/11	1/15
Catches/stumpings	2/–	1/–
- Source: Cricinfo, 7 May 2020

Ritu Dhrub (born 16 October 1994) is an Indian former cricketer. She played for the Assam women's cricket team in domestic matches.

She was born in Delhi, and is based in Sivasagar, Assam where she is employed in Railways. She made her international debut against Bangladesh in April 2013.
