= List of India women Twenty20 International cricketers =

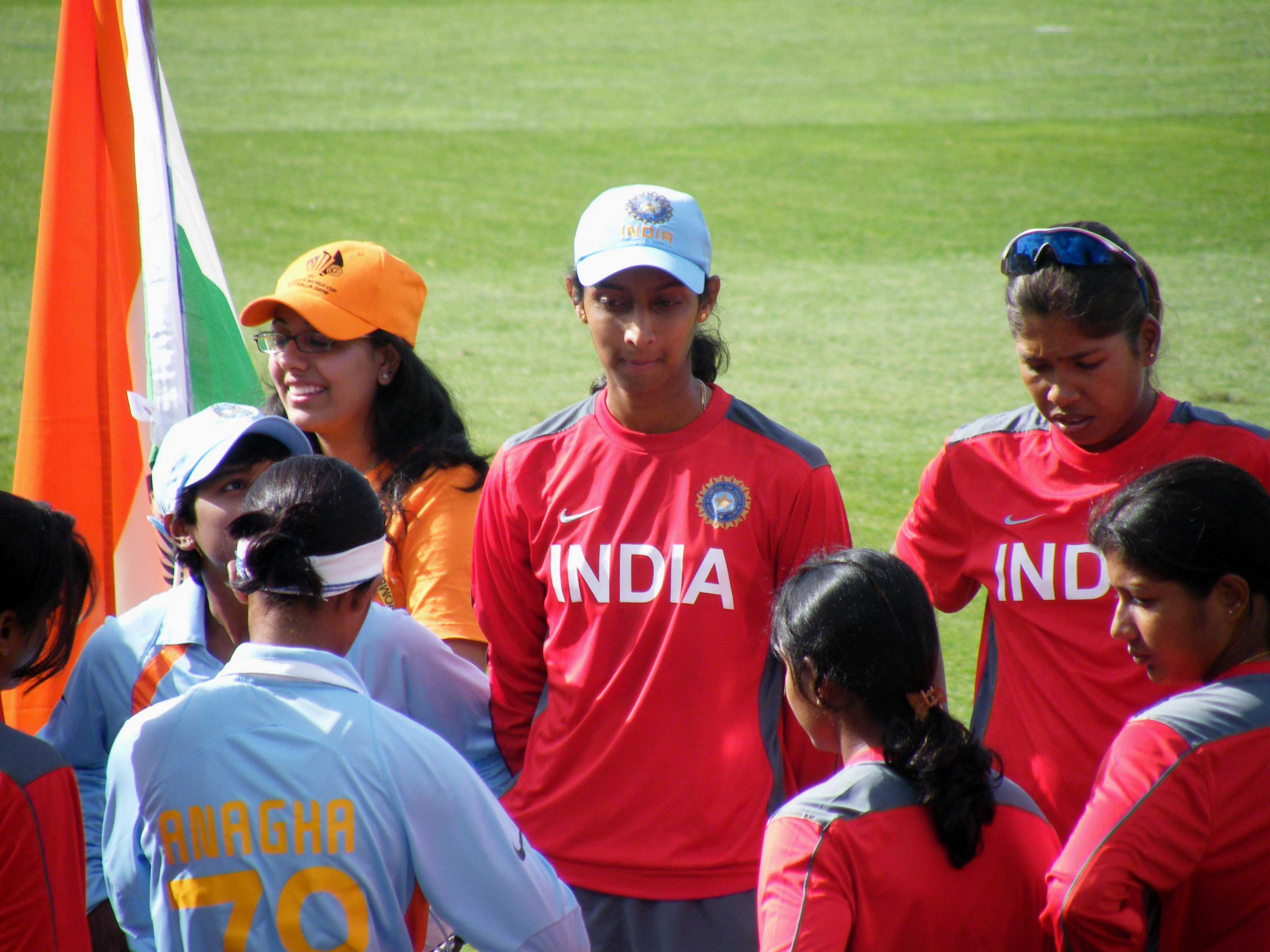
Members of the Indian cricket team before a Women's World Twenty20 game in Sydney, 2009.

A women's Twenty20 International (WT20I) is a 20 overs-per-side cricket match played in a maximum of 150 minutes between two ICC member sides, and is played under the rules of Twenty20 cricket. The first such match was held in August 2004 between England and New Zealand. The India women's national cricket team played its first WT20I against England in August 2006; India won the match by eight wickets.

Since the team made its first WT20I appearance in 2006, 73 players—including five different captains—have represented India in the format. The list is arranged in the order in which each player won her first Twenty20 cap. Where more than one player won her first Twenty20 cap in the same match, those players are listed alphabetically by surname.

== Key ==
General

- ‡ – Captain
- † – Wicket-keeper
- First – Year of debut
- Last – Year of latest game
- Mat – Number of matches played
- Win% – Winning percentage

Batting

- Runs – Runs scored in career
- HS – Highest score
- 100 – Centuries scored
- 50 – Half-centuries scored
- Avg – Runs scored per dismissal
- * – Batsman remained not out

Bowling

- Balls – Balls bowled in career
- Wkt – Wickets taken in career
- BBI – Best bowling in an innings
- Ave – Average runs per wicket

Fielding

- Ca – Catches taken
- St – Stumpings taken

== List of players ==
Statistics are correct as of 20 October 2026.

India women T20I cricketers
General					Batting					Bowling				Fielding		Ref
Cap	Name	First	Last	Mat	Runs	HS	Avg	50	100	Balls	Wkt	BBI	Ave	Ca	St	Ref
1	Nooshin Al Khadeer	2006	2008	2	—	—	—	—	—	42	1	1/28	41.00	0	—	
2	Anjum Chopra ‡	2006	2012	18	241	37*	17.21	0	0	—	—	—	—	3	—	
3	Rumeli Dhar	2006	2018	18	131	66*	18.71	1	0	295	13	3/13	23.30	7	—	
4	Preeti Dimri	2006	2006	1	—	—	—	—	—	24	1	1/19	19.00	0	—	
5	Jhulan Goswami ‡	2006	2018	68	405	37*	10.94	0	0	1,351	56	5/11	21.94	23	—	
6	Hemlata Kala	2006	2006	1	5	5*	—	0	0	24	0	—	—	0	—	
7	Reema Malhotra	2006	2012	22	115	32*	19.16	0	0	198	9	2/13	23.33	6	—	
8	Sulakshana Naik †	2006	2012	31	384	59	14.76	1	0	—	—	—	—	10	21	
9	Mithali Raj ‡	2006	2019	89	2,364	97*	37.52	17	0	6	0	—	—	19	—	
10	Amita Sharma	2006	2014	41	383	55*	14.73	1	0	565	16	2/11	35.25	8	—	
11	Monica Sumra	2006	2006	1	—	—	—	—	—	—	—	—	—	0	—	
12	Thirush Kamini	2008	2013	3	67	56	33.50	1	0	—	—	—	—	0	—	
13	Seema Pujare	2008	2008	1	—	—	—	—	—	12	0	—	—	0	—	
14	Jaya Sharma	2008	2008	1	5	5	5.00	0	0	—	—	—	—	0	—	
15	Gouher Sultana	2008	2014	37	6	3*	6.00	0	0	797	29	3/17	26.27	13	—	
16	Harmanpreet Kaur ‡	2009	2026	213	4,438	103	30.60	19	1	760	32	4/23	24.84	81	—	
17	Latika Kumari	2009	2015	6	61	36	10.16	0	0	—	—	—	—	2	—	
18	Priyanka Roy	2009	2011	15	95	22	10.55	0	0	269	21	5/16	12.47	3	—	
19	Punam Raut	2009	2014	35	719	75	27.65	4	0	42	3	3/12	9.66	5	—	
20	Soniya Dabir	2010	2014	13	68	23*	11.33	0	0	276	15	3/14	15.46	1	—	
21	Babita Mandlik	2010	2010	2	3	3	3.00	0	0	—	—	—	—	0	—	
22	Diana David	2010	2012	13	15	7*	3.00	0	0	258	16	4/12	14.18	2	—	
23	Samantha Lobatto †	2011	2011	3	3	3*	—	0	0	—	—	—	—	0	7	
24	Ekta Bisht	2011	2019	42	40	15	5.00	0	0	883	53	4/21	14.71	6	—	
25	Anagha Deshpande †	2011	2014	8	69	28	11.50	0	0	—	—	—	—	4	2	
26	Veda Krishnamurthy	2011	2020	76	875	57*	18.61	2	0	12	0	—	—	38	—	
27	Snehal Pradhan	2011	2011	4	2	2*	2.00	0	0	67	6	3/30	10.66	1	—	
28	Neha Tanwar	2011	2011	2	19	17	9.50	0	0	—	—	—	—	2	—	
29	Archana Das	2012	2014	23	8	2*	2.66	0	0	430	13	3/8	28.23	4	—	
30	Mamata Kanojia	2012	2012	4	10	6	3.33	0	0	—	—	—	—	1	—	
31	Shubhlakshmi Sharma	2012	2015	18	25	10	3.57	0	0	324	15	3/12	19.80	3	—	
32	Madhuri Mehta	2012	2014	3	23	23	11.50	0	0	—	—	—	—	0	—	
33	Mona Meshram	2012	2018	11	125	32	17.85	0	0	72	1	1/9	50.00	1	—	
34	Niranjana Nagarajan	2012	2016	14	42	15	7.00	0	0	271	9	2/15	26.22	3	—	
35	Anuja Patil	2012	2019	50	386	54*	17.54	1	0	1,036	48	3/14	21.00	17	—	
36	Rasanara Parwin	2012	2012	2	—	—	—	—	—	48	4	2/15	9.50	0	—	
37	Ritu Dhrub	2013	2013	3	2	2*	—	0	0	48	1	1/15	42.00	1	—	
38	Sneha Deepthi	2013	2013	2	1	1	1.00	0	0	—	—	—	—	0	—	
39	Swagatika Rath	2013	2013	2	14	9	7.00	0	0	18	0	—	—	0	—	
40	Smriti Mandhana‡	2013	2026	182	4,923	124	31.15	37	2	—	—	—	—	50	—	
41	Poonam Yadav	2013	2022	72	14	4	2.80	0	0	1,560	98	4/9	15.25	15	—	
42	Sushma Verma †	2013	2016	19	31	12	10.33	0	0	—	—	—	—	6	19	
43	Rajeshwari Gayakwad	2014	2023	58	12	5*	12.00	0	0	1,138	61	3/9	19.13	10	—	
44	Vellaswamy Vanitha	2014	2016	16	216	41	14.40	0	0	—	—	—	—	5	—	
45	Sneh Rana	2014	2025	31	84	16	14.00	0	0	594	26	3/9	24.15	12	—	
46	Karu Jain †	2014	2014	9	9	8*	4.50	0	0	—	—	—	—	4	8	
47	Sravanthi Naidu	2014	2014	6	11	11	11.00	0	0	109	9	4/9	8.33	2	—	
48	Shikha Pandey	2014	2023	62	208	26*	13.00	0	0	1,040	43	3/14	26.16	18	—	
49	Devika Vaidya	2014	2023	17	90	32	22.50	0	0	216	10	2/16	27.00	1	—	
50	Deepti Sharma	2016	2026	160	1,355	64	22.21	2	0	3,384	191	5/10	18.26	46	—	
51	Nuzhat Parween †	2016	2021	5	1	1	1.00	0	0	—	—	—	—	1	1	
52	Preeti Bose	2016	2016	5	2	2*	—	0	0	96	5	3/14	15.80	1	—	
53	Sabbhineni Meghana	2016	2022	17	258	69	18.42	1	0	—	—	—	—	4	—	
54	Mansi Joshi	2016	2019	8	6	3*	—	0	0	150	3	1/8	58.66	1	—	
55	Taniya Bhatia †	2018	2022	53	172	46	9.05	0	0	—	—	—	—	23	45	
56	Jemimah Rodrigues	2018	2026	131	2,824	76	29.41	16	0	54	1	1/9	50.00	40	—	
57	Pooja Vastrakar	2018	2024	72	332	37*	13.83	0	0	1,166	58	4/13	21.41	13	—	
58	Radha Yadav	2018	2026	91	93	14*	5.47	0	0	1,821	106	4/23	19.04	34	—	
59	Arundhati Reddy	2018	2026	57	155	27*	8.61	0	0	1127	50	4/22	29.50	16	—	
60	Dayalan Hemalatha	2018	2024	23	276	47	16.23	0	0	122	9	3/15	14.66	2	—	
61	Priya Punia	2019	2019	3	9	4	3.00	0	0	—	—	—	—	1	—	
62	Harleen Deol	2019	2025	28	311	52	17.27	1	0	108	6	2/13	23.33	8	—	
63	Bharti Fulmali	2019	2026	15	112	40	12.44	0	0	—	—	—	—	7	—	
64	Shafali Verma	2019	2026	122	3,453	100*	30.55	23	1	470	22	3/15	21.36	41	—	
65	Richa Ghosh †	2020	2026	99	1453	64*	25.94	2	0	—	—	—	—	52	45	
66	Simran Bahadur	2021	2022	6	10	10	10.00	0	0	90	1	1/29	126.00	1	—	
67	Ayushi Soni	2021	2021	1	—	—	—	—	—	—	—	—	—	0	—	
68	Yastika Bhatia †	2021	2026	26	374	54	19.68	1	0	—	—	—	—	5	8	
69	Renuka Singh	2021	2026	65	13	4*	4.33	0	0	1,422	70	5/15	22.50	10	—	
70	Meghna Singh	2021	2022	9	1	1	0.50	0	0	111	4	1/6	37.75	2	–	
71	Kiran Navgire	2022	2022	6	17	10*	5.66	0	0	—	—	—	—	0	0	
72	Anjali Sarvani	2022	2023	6	6	4	6.00	0	0	132	3	2/34	63.66	2	—	
73	Amanjot Kaur	2023	2026	23	189	63*	23.62	1	0	252	8	2/25	39.75	9	—	
74	Anusha Bareddy	2023	2023	2	—	—	—	—	—	48	1	1/20	44.00	0	—	
75	Minnu Mani	2023	2023	4	6	5*	6.00	0	0	66	5	2/9	11.60	0	—	
76	Rashi Kanojiya	2023	2023	1	—	—	—	—	—	24	0	—	—	0	—	
77	Kanika Ahuja	2023	2023	3	16	15	16.00	0	0	6	0	—	—	0	0	
78	Titas Sadhu	2023	2024	12	3	2	3.00	0	0	216	13	4/17	19.00	3	—	
79	Saika Ishaque	2023	2023	3	8	8	8.00	0	0	60	5	3/22	16.20	0	—	
80	Shreyanka Patil	2023	2026	27	27	7*	4.50	0	0	538	33	3/19	18.36	8	—	
81	Sajeevan Sajana	2024	2024	14	41	11	10.25	0	0	58	1	1/16	80.00	6	—	
82	Asha Sobhana	2024	2024	6	6	6*	—	0	0	138	9	3/19	16.33	1	—	
83	Uma Chetry †	2024	2024	7	37	24	9.25	0	0	—	—	—	—	3	1	
84	Tanuja Kanwar	2024	2024	4	—	—	—	—	—	96	1	1/14	76.00	2	—	
85	Saima Thakor	2024	2024	3	6	6	6.00	0	0	66	1	1/28	96.00	1	—	
86	Raghvi Bist	2024	2024	2	36	31*	36.00	0	0	—	—	—	—	1	—	
87	Shree Charani	2025	2026	35	15	7*	7.50	0	0	787	64	4/10	12.71	12	—	
88	Kranti Gaud	2025	2026	25	32	15*	16.00	0	0	426	14	2/24	35.64	6	—	
89	Vaishnavi Sharma	2025	2025	5	—	—	—	—	—	114	5	2/24	23.80	0	—	
90	Gunalan Kamalini	2025	2026	5	30	15*	10.00	0	0	—	—	—	—	4	—	
91	Kashvee Gautam	2026	2026	3	10	10	10.00	0	0	48	1	1/26	87.00	0	—	
92	Anushka Sharma	2026	2026	6	105	28	21.00	0	0	1	—	—	—	1	—	
93	Nandani Sharma	2026	2026	17	1	1	1.00	0	0	313	23	3/18	14.69	9	—	
94	Prema Rawat	2026	2026	7	13	6	6.50	0	0	138	7	3/9	18.85	2	—	
95	Pratika Rawal	2026	2026	4	56	22	14.00	0	0	—	—	—	—	2	—	
96	Niki Prasad	2026	2026	3	48	39*	48.00	0	0	24	3	2/7	4.00	2	—	

== WT20I captains ==
India women T20I captains
No.	Name	First	Last	Mat	Won	Lost	Tied	No result	Win%
1	Mithali Raj	2006	2016	32	17	15	0	0	53.12
2	Jhulan Goswami	2008	2015	18	8	10	0	0	44.44
3	Anjum Chopra	2012	2012	10	3	7	0	0	30.00
4	Harmanpreet Kaur	2012	2026	155	92	57	1	5	61.66
5	Smriti Mandhana	2019	2025	21	14	6	0	1	70.00
