= 2023–24 Senior Women's Inter Zonal Multi-Day Trophy =

Cricket tournament

2023–24 Senior Women's Cricket Inter Zonal Multi-Day Trophy
- Dates: 28 March – 11 April 2024
- Administrator: Board of Control for Cricket in India
- Cricket format: First-class
- Tournament format: Knockout
- Host: India
- Champions: East Zone (1st title)
- Runners-up: South Zone
- Participants: 6
- Matches: 5
- Player of the series: Deepti Sharma (East Zone)
- Most runs: Punam Raut (258) (Central Zone)
- Most wickets: Deepti Sharma (27) (East Zone)

2023–24 Senior Women's Inter Zonal Multi-Day Trophy was the fifth season of the Inter Zonal Multi-Day Trophy, a women's first-class cricket competition played in India. It took place from 28 March to 11 April 2024. The tournament featured six zonal teams – Central Zone, East Zone, North Zone, North East Zone, South Zone and West Zone. The fixtures were hosted by the Maharashtra Cricket Association at Pune. The tournament saw the teams competing in five knockout games including the final, with each match lasting a maximum of three days. It was the first women's domestic red-ball competition in India since 2018. North Zone were the defending champions. East Zone were crowned as the champions after beating South Zone by one wicket in the final.

== Format ==
Unlike the previous four seasons in which the five participating teams played against each other team once in the round-robin and the table topper was crowned the winner, the 2023-24 season was in a single-elimination format. After a drawing of lots, North Zone and South Zone were immediately placed in the semi-finals. East Zone faced North East Zone and West Zone faced Central Zone in the quarter-finals.

In case of a draw, the team with the lead in the first innings would proceed to the next round, as West Zone's first innings lead in the quarter-finals and South Zone's first innings lead in the semi-finals took them to the semi-finals and the final respectively.

== Fixtures ==
=== Quarter-finals ===
28–30 March 2024
Scorecard

East Zone	v	North East Zone
385/8d (100 overs); Dhara Gujjar 140 (216); Debasmita Dutta 5/76 (32 overs)		108 (34.3 overs); Prodhan Samayita 40 (72); Deepti Sharma 5/9 (7 overs)
		157 (75.3 overs) (f/o); Ningthoujam Devi 39 (84); Suravi Roy 2/0 (1.3 overs)

East Zone won by an innings and 120 runs
Pune Club Ground, Pune
Umpires: Ritika Buley and Kaushik Gandhi

- East Zone won the toss and elected to bat.

28–30 March 2024
Scorecard

Central Zone	v	West Zone
245 (87.3 overs); Punam Raut 84 (209); Anuja Patil 5/75 (27.3 overs)		356 (76.2 overs); Anuja Patil 122 (120); Poonam Yadav 7/116 (25 overs)
307/4d (92 overs); Punam Raut 174 (281); Radha Yadav 2/69 (25 overs)

Match drawn
DY Patil Academy, Ambi
Umpires: Ankita Guha and Anoop Pai

- Central Zone won the toss and elected to bat.

=== Semi-finals ===
3–5 April 2024
Scorecard

East Zone	v	North Zone
132 (71.4 overs); Monika Das 29 (75); Shafali Verma 2/4 (5.4 overs)		144 (41.3 overs); Shafali Verma 58 (88); Mamta Paswan 5/53 (18 overs)
282/9d (80 overs); Dhara Gujjar 58 (131); Mannat Kashyap 4/72 (16 overs)		135 (48.2 overs); Shafali Verma 49 (66); Deepti Sharma 6/49 (20 overs)

East Zone won by 135 runs
Pune Club Ground, Pune
Umpires: Nikhil Patil and Rohan Shrivastava

- East Zone won the toss and elected to bat.

3–5 April 2024
Scorecard

South Zone	v	West Zone
289 (94.5 overs); Arundhati Reddy 85 (166); Radha Yadav 4/72 (21.5 overs)		230 (70.5 overs); Yastika Bhatia 67 (127); Minnu Mani 6/73 (23.5 overs)
262/5 (101 overs); Tamanna Nigam 99 (200); Shradda Pokharkar 2/23 (12 overs)

Match drawn
DY Patil Academy, Ambi
Umpires: HD Rawle and Tanmay Srivastava

- South Zone won the toss and elected to bat.

=== Final ===
9–11 April 2024
Scorecard

South Zone	v	East Zone
133 (54.5 overs); Arundhati Reddy 57 (122); Deepti Sharma 4/28 (14.5 overs)		129 (43.4 overs); Richa Ghosh 25 (43); Minnu Mani 5/47 (15.4 overs)
179 (70.5 overs); Miriyala Durga 64 (130); Deepti Sharma 6/61 (25.5 overs)		184/9 (61.3 overs); Deepti Sharma 46 (92); Sahana Pawar 3/44 (17 overs)

East Zone won by 1 wickets
Maharashtra Cricket Association Stadium, Pune
Umpires: Narayanan Janani and Gayathri Venugopalan

- South Zone won the toss and elected to bat.

== Statistics ==
=== Most runs ===
Player	Team	Matches	Innings	Runs	Average	HS	100s	50s
Punam Raut	Central Zone	1	2	258	129.00	174	1	1
Dhara Gujjar	East Zone	3	5	236	47.20	140	1	1
Tamanna Nigam	South Zone	2	4	190	47.50	99	0	2
Source: ESPNcricinfo

=== Most wickets ===
Player	Team	Overs	Wickets	Average	5w	BBI
Deepti Sharma	East Zone	94.1	27	7.29	3	6/49
Minnu Mani	South Zone	61	14	13.21	2	6/73
Radha Yadav	West Zone	90.5	9	28.77	0	4/72
Source: ESPNcricinfo
