= Nandini Kashyap =

Indian cricketer (born 2003)

Personal information
- Full name: Nandini Unesh Kumar Kashyap
- Born: 13 December 2003 (age 22); Dehradun, Uttarakhand, India
- Batting: Right-handed
- Role: Wicket-keeper batter

Domestic team information
- Years: Team
- 2022–present: Uttarakhand

Career statistics
Competition	WFC	WLA	WT20
Matches	3	19	12
Runs scored	89	667	579
Batting average	17.80	44.46	57.90
100s/50s	0/0	2/2	1/4
Top score	33	131	117*
Catches/stumpings	8/1	12/6	4/3
- Source: ESPNcricinfo, 30 June 2025

Nandini Kashyap (born 13 December 2003) is an Indian cricketer who plays for the Uttarakhand in domestic cricket as a right-hand batter and wicket-keeper.

== Domestic career ==
In November 2022, she was selected to the India women's under-19 team in a five-match T20 series against New Zealand women's under-19 team and in December selected as backup wicket-keeper of the India for the 2023 Under-19 Women's T20 World Cup.

She scored a century in domestic T20 cricket against Pondicherry in October 2024. In September 2024, she played for Mussoorie Thunders in Uttarakhand Premier League. In November, she was the part of Champion side, India E in the Challenger Trophy.

In the third WPL auction in December 2024, Kashyap was purchased by the Delhi Capitals franchise for ₹ 10 lakh.

== International career ==
In December 2024, she earned maiden call-up for national team along with her domestic teammate Raghvi Bist, for the T20I series against West Indies.

In July 2025, Kashyap named in India A squad for multi-format white-ball tour against Australia.
