= Soppadhandi Yashasri =

Indian cricketer (born 2003)

Personal information
- Full name: Soppadhandi Venugopal Yashasri
- Born: 4 September 2003 (age 23); Hyderabad, Telangana, India
- Batting: Right-handed
- Bowling: Right-arm medium-fast

Domestic team information
- Years: Team
- 2018/19–present: Hyderabad
- 2023: UP Warriorz

Career statistics
Competition	List A	Twenty20
Matches	40	15
Runs scored	228	35
Batting average	11.40	8.75
100s/50s	0/0	0/0
Top score	37	10*
Balls bowled	1,626	219
Wickets	43	5
Bowling average	26.18	47.80
5 wickets in innings	0	0
10 wickets in match	0	0
Best bowling	4/49	2/11
Catches/stumpings	5/–	5/–
- Source: CricketArchive, 7 August 2025

Soppadhandi Venugopal Yashasri (born 4 September 2003) is an Indian cricketer who plays for Hyderabad and UP Warriorz in WPL as a right-hand batter and medium fast bowler.

== Career ==
She made her senior debut for Hyderabad as List A against Odisha on 1 December 2018 in 2018–19 Senior Women's One Day League. She made her T20 debut against Meghalaya in 2021–22 Senior Women's T20 Trophy on 18 April 2022.

In December 2022, Yashasri named in India women's national under-19 cricket team for the T20 series against South Africa under-19 cricket team and as a reserve player in 2023 Under-19 Women's T20 World Cup. Later she replaced Hurley Gala due to injury concern.

In February 2023, she was signed by UP Warriorz at a price of ₹10 lakh to play for them in the Women's Premier League. In June 2023, Yashasri named in India A squad for the Women's T20 Emerging Teams Asia Cup.

In July 2024, she was named in India A squad for the multi-format series against Australia.
