= Raghvi Bist =

Indian cricketer (born 2004)

Personal information
- Full name: Raghvi Anand Bist
- Born: 11 October 2004 (age 22)
- Batting: Right-handed
- Bowling: Right-arm medium-fast
- Role: Batter

International information
- National side: India
- T20I debut (cap 86): 17 December 2024 v West Indies
- Last T20I: 19 December 2024 v West Indies
- T20I shirt no.: 11

Domestic team information
- Years: Team
- 2019–present: Uttarakhand

Career statistics
Competition	WT20I	WFC	WLA	WT20
Matches	2	1	31	37
Runs scored	36	42	813	632
Batting average	36.00	21.00	27.10	25.28
100s/50s	0/0	0/0	0/6	0/3
Top score	31*	26	82	72
Balls bowled	–	12	708	246
Wickets	–	0	11	8
Bowling average	–	–	37.54	28.37
5 wickets in innings	–	–	0	0
10 wickets in match	–	–	0	0
Best bowling	–	–	4/16	2/15
Catches/stumpings	1/–	1/–	6/–	7/–
- Source: ESPNcricinfo, 17 December 2024

Raghvi Singh Bist (born 11 October 2004) is an Indian cricketer who plays for the Uttarakhand in domestic cricket as a right-hand batter and right-arm medium pace bowler.

== Domestic career ==
She plays domestic cricket for Uttarakhand. She made her List A debut against Assam in the 2020–21 Senior Women's One Day Trophy on 12 March 2021. She made her Twenty20 debut against Manipur in the 2019–20 Senior Women's T20 Trophy on 14 October 2019. In December 2022, she scored a double century (219 off 154) against Nagaland U19 women's team in the Women's U19 one-day tournament. She became the third player overall, after Smriti Mandhana and Jemimah Rodrigues, to hit a double century in the Women's U19 one-day tournament.

In August 2024, she was named in India A squad for the Australia tour. She scored three consecutive half century in unofficial ODIs against Australia A in that tour. She made her first-class debut for India A against Australia A on 22 August 2024. In the final of 2024 Women's Challenger Trophy she scored a half century (71 off 51) and their team (India E) won the title, and she awarded Player of the Match for her brilliant match-winning innings. In December 2024, she was signed by Royal Challengers Bangalore at a price of ₹10 lakh to play for them in the Women's Premier League auction.

== International career ==
In August 2024, Bist was named in India women's team as a non-travelling reserve for the 2024 Women's T20 World Cup. In December 2024, she earned maiden call-up for national team along with her domestic teammate Nandini Kashyap, for the T20I series against West Indies. She made her Twenty20 International (T20I) debut against West Indies in the same series on 17 December 2024. She scored unbeaten 31 runs in the third T20I against West Indies.
