= Dhara Gujjar =

Indian cricketer (born 2002)

Personal information
- Full name: Dhara Gujjar
- Born: 18 August 2002 (age 24); Kolkata, West Bengal, India
- Batting: Left-handed
- Bowling: Right-arm medium
- Role: All-rounder

Domestic team information
- Years: Team
- Bengal
- 2023: Mumbai Indians

Career statistics
| Competition |
|---|
| Matches |
| Runs scored |
| Batting average |
| 100s/50s |
| Top score |
| Balls bowled |
| Wickets |
| Bowling average |
| 5 wickets in innings |
| 10 wickets in match |
| Best bowling |
| Catches/stumpings |
- Source: ESPNcricinfo, 28 March 2023

Dhara Gujjar (born 18 August 2002) is an Indian cricketer who plays for Bengal. She plays as a right-arm medium fast bowler and left-handed batter. In the inaugural WPL auction in February 2023, Gujjar was purchased by Mumbai Indians franchise at 10 lakhs.
