= Tanuja Kanwar =

Indian cricketer (born 1998)

Personal information
- Full name: Tanuja Kanwar
- Born: 28 January 1998 (age 28); Shimla, Himachal Pradesh, India
- Batting: Left-handed
- Bowling: Left-arm orthodox
- Role: Bowler

International information
- National side: India (2024–present)
- ODI debut (cap 151): 27 December 2024 v West Indies
- Last ODI: 15 January 2025 v Ireland
- ODI shirt no.: 32
- T20I debut (cap 84): 21 July 2024 v United Arab Emirates
- Last T20I: 28 July 2024 v Sri Lanka
- T20I shirt no.: 32

Domestic team information
- Years: Team
- 2013–2021: Himachal
- 2022–present: Railways
- 2023–present: Gujarat Giants

Career statistics
Competition	ODI	T20I	WFC	WLA
Matches	2	4	11	88
Runs scored	–	–	136	630
Batting average	–	–	10.46	14.65
100s/50s	–	–	0/0	0/0
Top score	–	–	23*	44*
Balls bowled	108	96	2,048	4,487
Wickets	2	1	41	139
Bowling average	37.50	76.00	16.92	14.70
5 wickets in innings	0	0	1	1
10 wickets in match	0	0	0	0
Best bowling	2/31	1/14	5/36	6/10
Catches/stumpings	0/–	2/–	4/–	30/–
Medal record
Representing India
Women's Cricket
Women's Asia Cup
Runner-up	2024 Sri Lanka
- Source: CricketArchive, 21 July 2024

Tanuja Kanwar (born 28 January 1998) is an Indian cricketer who currently plays for Railways and Gujarat Giants. She plays as a left-arm orthodox bowler. She made her international debut for India in 2024.

== Domestic career ==
In February 2024, she was signed by Gujarat Giants at a price of ₹50 lakh to play for them in the Women's Premier League auction. She played her first WPL match against Mumbai Indians on 4 March 2023. She played eight matches in the WPL 2023, where she picked up five wickets at an economy rate of 8.85. She took 10 wickets from eight games at an economy rate of 7.13 in WPL 2024.

== International career ==
On 21 July 2024, she was added to the India's squad as a replacement of Shreyanka Patil, for the 2024 Women's Twenty20 Asia Cup. Kanwar made her Twenty20 International (T20I) debut against UAE, in the same tournament on 21 July 2024. She made her One Day International (ODI) debut against West Indies on 27 December 2024.
