= Pratika Rawal =

Indian cricketer (born 2000)

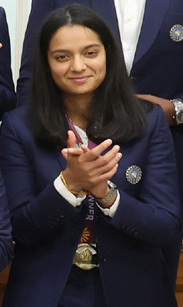
- Rawal in 2025

Personal information
- Born: 1 September 2000 (age 26); Delhi, India
- Batting: Right-handed
- Bowling: Right-arm off break
- Role: Opening batter

International information
- National side: India (2024–present)
- Only Test (cap 97): 6 March 2026 v Australia
- ODI debut (cap 150): 22 December 2024 v West Indies
- Last ODI: 26 October 2025 v Bangladesh
- ODI shirt no.: 64

Domestic team information
- Years: Team
- 2021–2024: Delhi
- 2024–present: Railways

Career statistics
Competition	WODI	FC	LA	T20
Matches	30	4	47	24
Runs scored	1,409	257	2,006	574
Batting average	54.19	32.12	57.31	24.95
100s/50s	3/10	1/1	5/13	0/5
Top score	154	120	161*	76
Balls bowled	209	60	169	6
Wickets	6	1	4	0
Bowling average	31.33	26.00	38.00	–
5 wickets in innings	0	0	0	–
10 wickets in match	0	0	0	–
Best bowling	2/37	1/0	2/37	–
Catches/stumpings	5/–	0/–	28/–	8/–
Medal record
Women's cricket
Representing India
ICC Cricket World Cup
Winner	2025 India
Asian Games
Gold medal – first place	Aichi–Nagoya 2026
ACC Asia Cup
Winner	2026 UAE
- Source: ESPNcricinfo, 30 October 2026

Pratika Rawal (born 1 September 2000) is an Indian international cricketer who plays for the Indian women's national cricket team. She represents Railways in domestic cricket. Rawal was an integral part of the Indian team that won the 2025 Women's Cricket World Cup.

== Early life ==
Rawal was born in Delhi on 1 September 2000. She completed her schooling from Modern School at Barakhamba Road and acquired 92.5 per cent in the CBSE grade 12 board exams, before finishing her bachelor's degree in psychology from Jesus and Mary College, New Delhi. She also played basketball for Bal Bharati School in Rajender Nagar and won gold medal at the 64th School National Games in Delhi in January 2019. Her father, Pradeep Rawal is a BCCI-certified Level-II umpire of the Delhi & District Cricket Association (DDCA). At the age of 10 when she was in fourth standard she started her career in cricket. She trained under coach, Sharvan Kumar in Rohtak Road Gymkhana Cricket Academy. Then she started training under former cricketer Dipti Dhyani, and Delhi women's team coach Dishant Yagnik.

== Domestic career ==
She played for Delhi from 2021 to early 2024. Then she plays for Railways in 2024 in the Senior Women's One Day Trophy and Senior Women's T20 Trophy. She made her List A debut for Delhi against Jharkhand on 31 October 2021 in the 2021–22 Senior Women's One Day Trophy. She scored unbeaten 161 off 155 against Assam and she scored 247 from seven matches with average of 49.40 a strike-rate of 78.41 in this season. She made her Twenty20 debut for Delhi against Railways on 21 April 2022 in the 2021–22 Senior Women's T20 Trophy. In 2023–24 Senior Women's One Day Trophy she scored 411 runs from eight matches with the average of 68.50 and a strike-rate of 91.94 including two centuries and a top score of 141. She also played for the East Delhi Riders in the Women's Delhi Premier League in 2024. In 2024, she captained Delhi to the final of the 2024 Under-23 T20 Trophy. She was the second highest run-scorer for her team after Tanisha Singh, having scored 182 runs from nine matches at an average of 26 and a strike-rate of 85.94. She made her first-class debut for North Zone against East Zone on 3 April 2024 in the 2023–24 Senior Women's Inter Zonal Multi-Day Trophy.

== International career ==
In December 2024, she earned maiden call-up for national team for the ODI series against West Indies. She made her One Day International debut against West Indies on 22 December 2024 and became the 150th ODI cricketer for India. On her debut ODI match, she scored 40 runs and stand a 110 runs partnership with Smriti Mandhana. In the second ODI match she scored her maiden half century (76) and picked two wickets against West Indies. She also shared a 110 runs partnership with Smriti Mandhana in second ODI. She took her first international wicket dismissing West Indies captain Hayley Matthews (106). Jemimah Rodrigues took the catch and sealed Matthews' dismissal.

On 10 January 2025, she dedicated her Player of the Match award to her family and coach. She scored her first century (154) in ODIs against Ireland on 15 January 2025 at Niranjan Shah Stadium in Rajkot. She won her first international the player of the match and the player of the series awards in that series on 15 January 2025. She became the third quickest Indian (in terms of number of matches taken) to score a maiden century in ODIs, and became the third Indian player to go past the 150 mark in women's ODIs after Deepti Sharma (188) and Harmanpreet Kaur (171).

She became the first women's cricketer to score most runs (444) in first six innings and broke former England captain Charlotte Edwards record (434) in her first six innings in ODIs. She became the fastest cricketer (in terms of number of innings taken) to reach 500 runs in ODIs (8 innings) and broke Charlotte Edwards record (9 innings).

She became the joint-fastest cricketer to score 1,000 runs in ODIs, in the terms of innings (23), and scored first century in Women's Cricket World Cup against New Zealand on 23 October 2025.
