= Saima Thakor =

Indian cricketer (born 1996)

Personal information
- Full name: Saima Zakirhussain Thakor
- Born: 13 September 1996 (age 30); Mumbai, Maharashtra, India
- Batting: Right-handed
- Bowling: Right-arm medium-fast
- Role: Bowler

International information
- National side: India
- ODI debut (cap 145): 24 October 2024 v New Zealand
- Last ODI: 29 October 2024 v New Zealand
- ODI shirt no.: 8
- T20I debut (cap 85): 15 December 2024 v West Indies
- Last T20I: 17 December 2024 v West Indies
- T20I shirt no.: 8

Domestic team information
- Years: Team
- 2017–present: Mumbai
- 2024: UP Warriorz

Career statistics
Competition	WODI	WT20I	FC	LA
Matches	10	3	3	53
Runs scored	46	6	11	237
Batting average	7.66	6.00	3.66	13.94
100s/50s	0/0	0/0	0/0	0/0
Top score	29	6	8	32
Balls bowled	425	66	402	2,147
Wickets	7	1	5	52
Bowling average	52.71	96.00	46.40	26.25
5 wickets in innings	0	0	0	0
10 wickets in match	0	0	0	0
Best bowling	3/62	1/28	2/43	4/14
Catches/stumpings	3/–	1/–	1/–	13/–
- Source: ESPNcricinfo, 25 October 2024

Saima Thakor (born 13 September 1996) is an Indian cricketer who plays for the India women's national team. She represents Mumbai in domestic cricket and UP Warriorz in the Women's Premier League.

== Career ==
Thakor plays domestic cricket for Mumbai women's cricket team. In February 2024, she was signed by UP Warriorz at a price of ₹10 lakh to play for them in the Women's Premier League auction. She played football and was a goalkeeper for her college team.

In August 2024, Thakor was named in India women's team as a travelling reserve for the 2024 ICC Women's T20 World Cup. In October 2024, she earned maiden call-up for national team for the ODI series against New Zealand. She made her One Day International (ODI) debut in the first ODI of the same series on 24 October 2024. She took two wickets on her first ODI match. She made a 70 run partnership with Radha Yadav against New Zealand in the second ODI was the highest 9th-wicket partnership for India in women's ODIs. She made her Women's Twenty20 International (T20I) debut against West Indies on 15 December 2024. She took her first T20I wicket dismissing West Indies player Qiana Joseph.
