= Titas Sadhu =

Indian cricketer (born 2004)

Personal information
- Full name: Titas Sadhu
- Born: 29 September 2004 (age 22); Chinsura, West Bengal, India
- Batting: Right-handed
- Bowling: Right-arm medium
- Role: Bowler

International information
- National side: India (2023–present)
- ODI debut (cap 148): 5 December 2024 v Australia
- Last ODI: 11 December 2024 v Australia
- T20I debut (cap 78): 24 September 2023 v Bangladesh
- Last T20I: 9 January 2024 v Australia

Domestic team information
- Years: Team
- 2021–present: Bengal
- 2023–present: Delhi Capitals

Career statistics
Competition	ODI	T20I	FC	LA
Matches	8	12	4	16
Runs scored	9	3	42	96
Batting average	3.00	3.00	14.00	10.66
100s/50s	0/0	0/0	0/0	0/0
Top score	4	2	23*	26
Balls bowled	368	216	372	670
Wickets	6	13	7	15
Bowling average	50.66	19.00	26.42	36.93
5 wickets in innings	0	0	0	0
10 wickets in match	0	0	0	0
Best bowling	2/42	4/17	4/30	3/32
Catches/stumpings	1/–	3/–	2/–	3/–
Medal record
Women's Cricket
Representing India
Asian Games
Gold medal – first place	2022 Hangzhou	Team
ICC Under-19 Women’s T20 World Cup
Winner	2023 South Africa
- Source: ESPNcricinfo, 20 February 2024

Titas Sadhu (born 29 September 2004) is an Indian cricketer who plays for the Indian women's national cricket team and Bengal in domestic cricket. She was a part of the 2023 U19 Women's T20 World Cup winning Indian team and was named Player of the Match in the final.

Sadhu made her WT20I debut on 24 September 2023 against Bangladesh at the 2022 Asian Games. In the same tournament, she played a key role as a bowler against Sri Lanka in the final, which was won by India. She was then supported by GoSports Foundation under Equal Hue Cricket Excellence Programme, which helped her get to the next level through various interventions (including a pitch made for her near her house so she has access to quality training without any hassle).

== Early life ==
Sadhu was born on 29 September 2004 in Chinsurah, West Bengal. At the age of 16, Sadhu was selected to play for the senior Bengal team. She used to study at Techno India Group Public School, Chuchura, Hooghly.

== Career ==
Sadhu was awarded the player of the match in the final of inaugural U19 Women's World Cup. In the 2023 Women's Premier League, Sadhu was part of the Delhi Capitals squad, but did not play a match.

In August 2023, she was selected in the India squad for the 2022 Asian Games. On 24 September 2023, she made her international debut for India against Bangladesh.

In December 2023, Sadhu was selected in India's ODI for series against Australia.
