= Priya Mishra =

Indian cricketer (born 2004)

Personal information
- Born: 4 June 2004 (age 22); Prayagraj, Uttar Pradesh, India
- Batting: Right-handed
- Bowling: Right-arm leg break
- Role: Bowler

International information
- National side: India
- ODI debut (cap 147): 27 October 2024 v New Zealand
- Last ODI: 29 October 2024 v New Zealand
- ODI shirt no.: 12

Domestic team information
- Years: Team
- 2022–present: Delhi

Career statistics
Competition	WODI	WFC	WLA	WT20
Matches	9	3	35	28
Runs scored	6	10	9	6
Batting average	3.00	3.33	1.80	2.00
100s/50s	0/0	0/0	0/0	0/0
Top score	5	4*	5	2
Balls bowled	406	647	1,700	553
Wickets	15	14	78	23
Bowling average	26.60	23.50	16.48	28.43
5 wickets in innings	0	0	3	0
10 wickets in match	0	0	0	0
Best bowling	3/49	4/58	5/14	3/16
Catches/stumpings	0/–	1/–	6/–	4/–
- Source: ESPNcricinfo, 27 October 2024

Priya Mishra (born 4 June 2004) is an Indian cricketer who plays for the national team. She represents Delhi in domestic cricket.

== Career ==
Mishra plays domestic cricket for Delhi women's cricket team. In February 2024, she was signed by Gujarat Giants at a price of ₹20 lakh to play for them in the Women's Premier League auction but did not get a chance to play. She was also a leading wicket-taker of 2023–24 Senior Women's One Day Trophy, picking up 23 wickets in only eight matches. She took a five-wicket haul (5/14) against Australia A, in an unofficial ODI, on 18 August 2024. She also took a four-wicket haul (4/58) in the first innings of an unofficial Test in the same series, and she picked up total six wickets in both innings.

In August 2024, Mishra was named in India women's team as a non-travelling reserve for the 2024 ICC Women's T20 World Cup. In October 2024, she was earned maiden call-up for national team for the ODI series against New Zealand. She made her One Day International (ODI) debut in the second ODI of the same series on 27 October 2024.
