= Sayali Satghare =

Indian cricketer (born 2000)

Personal information
- Full name: Sayali Ganesh Satghare
- Born: 2 July 2000 (age 26); Mumbai, Maharashtra, India
- Batting: Right-handed
- Bowling: Right-arm medium-fast
- Role: All-rounder

International information
- National side: India (2025–present)
- Only Test (cap 98): 6 March 2026 v Australia
- ODI debut (cap 152): 10 January 2025 v Ireland
- Last ODI: 15 January 2025 v Ireland
- ODI shirt no.: 47

Domestic team information
- Years: Team
- 2015–present: Mumbai
- 2024: Gujarat Giants
- 2026: Royal Challengers Bangalore

Career statistics
Competition	WODI	WFC	WLA	WT20
Matches	3	5	59	52
Runs scored	2	121	686	435
Batting average	–	20.16	19.60	19.77
100s/50s	–	0/0	1/2	0/0
Top score	2*	35*	100*	43
Balls bowled	138	636	2,253	804
Wickets	3	11	67	38
Bowling average	35.66	26.90	20.80	20.23
5 wickets in innings	–	0	1	1
10 wickets in match	–	0	0	0
Best bowling	1/24	3/42	7/5	5/13
Catches/stumpings	1/–	3/–	12/–	15/–
- Source: ESPNcricinfo, 14 December 2024

Sayali Satghare (born 2 July 2000) is an Indian cricketer who plays for the Mumbai in domestic cricket and Royal Challengers Bangalore in the Women's Premier League.

== Domestic career ==
Satghare plays domestic cricket for Mumbai women's cricket team. She made her List A debut against Punjab in the 2015–16 Senior Women's One Day League on 15 November 2015. She made her Twenty20 debut against Tripura in the 2019–20 Senior Women's T20 Trophy on 14 October 2019. She made her first-class debut for West Zone against Central Zone on 28 March 2024 in the 2023–24 Senior Women's Inter Zonal Multi-Day Trophy. She scored an unbeaten century (100) against Arunachal Pradesh in the 2023–24 Senior Women's One Day Trophy.

In February 2024, she was named as a replacement of Kashvee Gautam, by Gujarat Giants at a reserve price of ₹10 lakh to play 2024 WPL. She became the first player to play her first WPL match as concussion substitute for Dayalan Hemalatha in WPL.

== International career ==
In October 2024, she earned a maiden call-up for national team for the ODI series against New Zealand but didn't get a match. In January 2025, she was named in India's ODI squad against Ireland. She made her One Day International (ODI) debut in the first match of the following series against Ireland on 10 January 2025. She took her first international wicket dismissing Irish cricketer Arlene Kelly.
