= Uma Chetry =

Indian cricketer (born 2002)

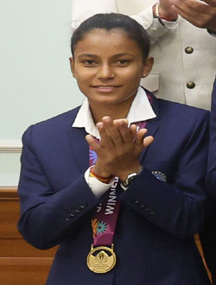
- Chetry in 2025

Personal information
- Born: 27 July 2002 (age 24); Bokakhat, Assam, India
- Batting: Right-handed
- Role: Wicket-keeper-batter

International information
- National side: India (2024–present)
- Only ODI (cap 157): 26 October 2025 v Bangladesh
- ODI shirt no.: 55
- T20I debut (cap 83): 7 July 2024 v South Africa
- Last T20I: 28 July 2024 v Sri Lanka
- T20I shirt no.: 55

Domestic team information
- Years: Team
- 2015/16–present: Assam
- 2024: UP Warriorz

Career statistics
Competition	WODI	WT20I
Matches	1	7
Runs scored	–	37
Batting average	–	9.25
100s/50s	–/–	0/2
Top score	–	24
Catches/stumpings	–/–	3/1
Medal record
Women's cricket
Representing India
ICC Cricket World Cup
Winner	2025 India
Asian Games
Gold medal – first place	2022 Hangzhou
ACC Asia Cup
Runner-up	2024 Sri Lanka
- Source: ESPNcricinfo, 26 October 2025

Uma Chetry (born 27 July 2002) is an Indian international cricketer from Assam. She plays for the India women's national cricket team as a wicket-keeper-batter. Chetry was part of the Indian national squads that won the 2025 Women's Cricket World Cup and the gold medal in the 2022 Asian Games. She represents Assam in domestic cricket and plays for UP Warriorz in the Women's Premier League.

== Early life ==
Chetry hails from Kandulimari village in Bokakhat division of Golaghat district, Assam. Her mother encouraged her to play cricket when she saw Chetry playing on the roads along with her brother Bijoy and other boys. She is the only girl among her five siblings. She attended Bokakhat Hindi High School.

== Career ==
In June 2023, Chetry played for India A at the 2023 ACC Women's T20 Emerging Teams Asia Cup.

In July 2023, Chetry was named in her first India squad, for the WT20I side's series against Bangladesh. In September 2023, she was in India's squad for the Asian Games.

In May 2024, she was named in WODI, WT20I and Test squads for the series against South Africa, making her international debut in a T20I on 7 July 2024.

Chetry was named in the India squad for their home WODI series against New Zealand in October 2024.

Uma Chetry was named in the Indian squad for the WODI series against Australia and the 2025 Women's Cricket World Cup after Yastika Bhatia sustained an injury. Chetry made her WODI debut against Bangladesh in the World Cup.
