= Prema Rawat =

Indian cricketer

Personal information
- Full name: Prema Rawat
- Born: 12 November 2001 (age 25)
- Batting: Right-handed
- Bowling: Right-arm leg break
- Role: Bowler

International information
- National side: India

Domestic team information
- Years: Team
- Uttarakhand
- 2025–present: Royal Challengers Bengaluru

Career statistics
Competition	WT20I	WPL
Matches	1	6
Runs scored	3	8
Batting average	–	–
100s/50s	0/0	0/0
Top score	3*	8*
Balls bowled	12	36
Wickets	0	3
Bowling average	–	20.33
5 wickets in innings	0	0
10 wickets in match	0	0
Best bowling	0/21	2/16
Catches/stumpings	0/–	3/–
- Source: Cricinfo, 21 June 2026

Prema Rawat (born 12 November 2001) is an Indian cricketer. A right-handed batter and right-arm leg-break bowler, she plays domestic cricket for Uttarakhand and has played in the Women's Premier League for Royal Challengers Bengaluru.

Rawat is from Uttarakhand. Before committing fully to cricket, she also played hockey. Ahead of the 2025 Women's Premier League, she was bought by Royal Challengers Bengaluru for ₹1.2 crore.

Rawat later represented India A. In August 2025, she was added across all three formats for the India A women's tour of Australia after injuries to Shreyanka Patil and Priya Mishra. She took eight wickets in five matches during India A's victorious campaign in the Women's Asia Cup Rising Stars tournament.

In June 2026, she was named in India's squad for the remainder of the 2026 ICC Women's T20 World Cup as a replacement for the injured Patil. She made her Women's Twenty20 International debut against South Africa at Manchester on 21 June 2026.
