= Minnu Mani =

Indian cricketer

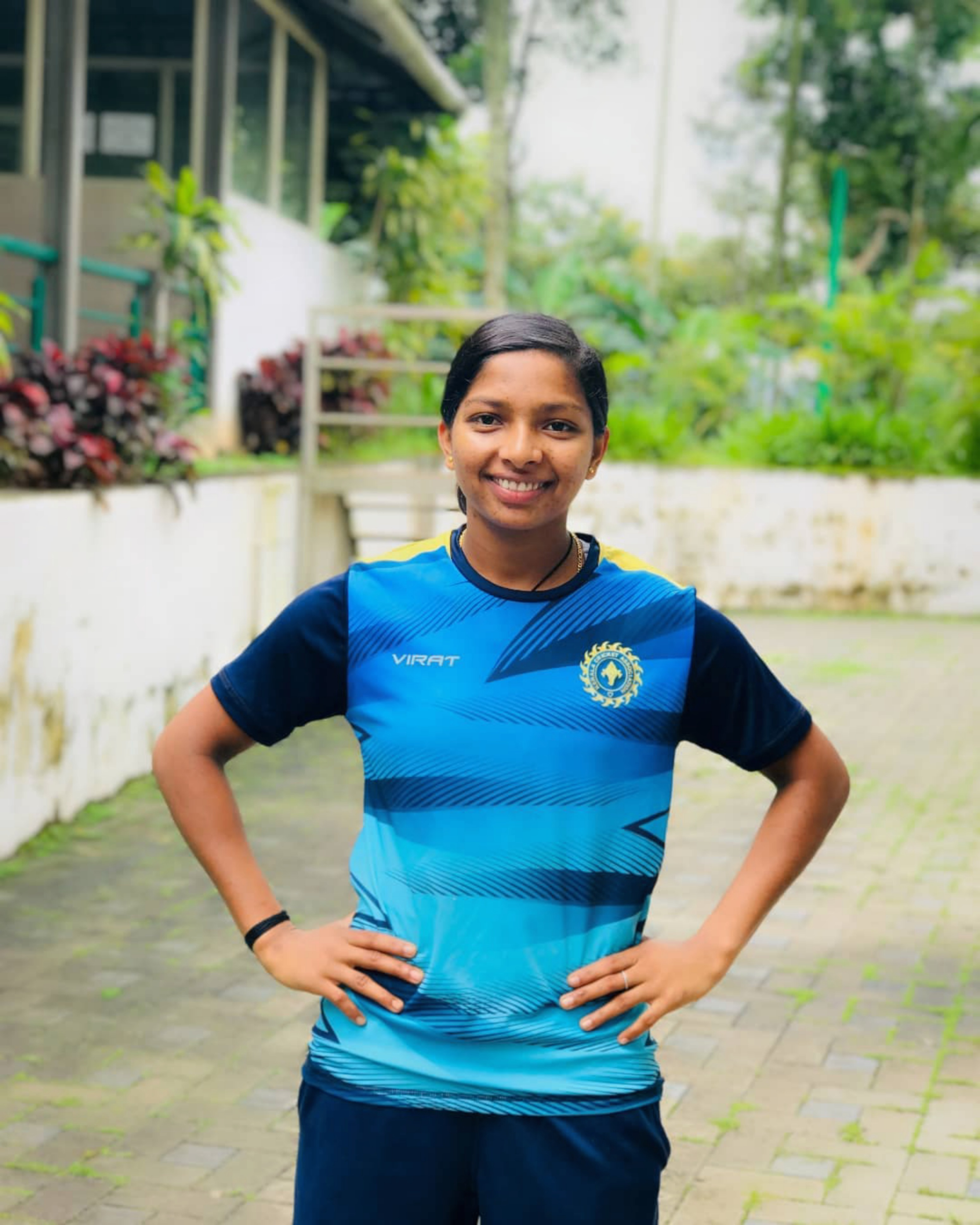

Personal information
- Born: 24 March 1999 (age 27); Wayanad, Kerala, India
- Batting: Left-handed
- Bowling: Right-arm off break
- Role: All-rounder

International information
- National side: India (2023-present)
- ODI debut (cap 149): 8 December 2024 v Australia
- Last ODI: 15 January 2025 v Ireland
- ODI shirt no.: 71
- T20I debut (cap 74): 9 July 2023 v Bangladesh
- Last T20I: 21 September 2023 v Malaysia
- T20I shirt no.: 71

Domestic team information
- Years: Team
- 2014/15–2024/25: Kerala
- 2025/26–present: Railways
- 2023–present: Delhi Capitals

Career statistics
Competition	ODI	T20I	WFC	WLA
Matches	3	4	6	72
Runs scored	54	6	111	1,175
Batting average	54.00	6.00	11.10	26.11
100s/50s	0/0	0/0	0/0	0/4
Top score	46*	5*	31	85*
Balls bowled	120	66	1,378	2,573
Wickets	3	5	41	84
Bowling average	43.00	11.60	16.95	18.23
5 wickets in innings	-	0	5	0
10 wickets in match	-	0	1	0
Best bowling	2/71	2/9	6/73	4/9
Catches/stumpings	2/–	0/–	3/–	31/–
Medal record
Representing India
Women's Cricket
Asian Games
Gold medal – first place	2022 Hangzhou	Team
- Source: ESPNcricinfo, 10 October 2023

Minnu Mani (born 24 March 1999) is an Indian international, right arm off break bowler who represents the Indian women's national team. She plays for Delhi Capitals in Women's Premier League. In domestic cricket, she represents Kerala cricket team. She became the first Kerala woman cricketer to play for India.

== Early life ==
Minnu hails from Choyimoola in Wayanad district of Kerala. Her father, Mani CK, is a daily wage labourer and her mother, Vasantha, is a homemaker. She has a younger sister, Mimitha. She studied at Mananthavady Government Vocational Higher Secondary School, Edappady till Grade 8 and St. Sebastian High School, Thodupuzha till Grade 10. She completed her higher secondary education at Sarvajana Higher Secondary School, Sulthan Bathery and graduated from Government College for Women, Thiruvananthapuram. As of 2023, she is pursuing her BA in Sociology through distance learning.

She started playing cricket at 10 with boys at paddy fields. Initially, her family didn't support the idea of her playing cricket. Her physical education teacher, Elsamma noticed her skill and took her to selection trials of the Wayanad District Under-13 team. The next year, she played in the Kerala U-16 team and represented Kerala at the senior level aged 16. Minnu had to travel one and a half hours daily, switching four buses to reach the nearest stadium from her home for cricket practice.

== Domestic career ==
Minnu made her debut for Kerala at the age of 16. She was the key performer when the Kerala U-23 women's team won the national T20 championship in 2018 with of 188 runs and 11 wickets. In 2019, she represented India Blue in the Under-23 One Day Challenger Trophy. She got her maiden call for the India A team touring Bangladesh and was called for ACC Emerging Women's Asia Cup in the same year.

== Women's Premier League ==
In February 2023, she was bought by the Delhi Capitals in the WPL auction ahead of the 2023 Women's Premier League.

== International career ==
In July 2023, she was called up to the Indian team touring Bangladesh, making her the first female cricketer from Kerala to earn an India call-up. She made her Women's Twenty20 International cricket (WT20I) debut for India Women against Bangladesh Women on 9 July 2023. She finished the series as India's highest wicket-taker, with 5 wickets from three matches. In July 2023, she was selected in India's 2023 Asian Games squad.

In December 2023, Mani was selected in India's T20I series against Australia.
