= Renuka Singh (cricketer) =

Indian cricketer (born 1996)

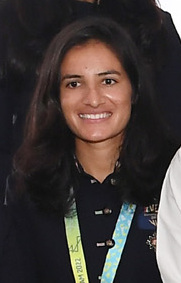
- Singh in 2022

Personal information
- Full name: Renuka Singh Thakur
- Born: 2 January 1996 (age 30); Shimla, Himachal Pradesh, India
- Batting: Right-handed
- Bowling: Right-arm medium-fast
- Role: Bowler

International information
- National side: India (2021–present)
- Test debut (cap 93): 14 December 2023 v England
- Last Test: 21 December 2023 v Australia
- ODI debut (cap 137): 18 February 2022 v New Zealand
- Last ODI: 2 November 2025 v South Africa
- ODI shirt no.: 10
- T20I debut (cap 69): 7 October 2021 v Australia
- Last T20I: 27 April 2026 v South Africa
- T20I shirt no.: 10

Domestic team information
- Years: Team
- 2011/12–2020/21: Himachal Pradesh
- 2021/22–present: Railways
- 2022: Trailblazers
- 2023–2025: Royal Challengers Bengaluru
- 2026–present: Gujarat Giants

Career statistics
| Competition | WTest | WODI | WT20I |
|---|---|---|---|
| Matches | 3 | 27 | 54 |
| Runs scored | 9 | 21 | 12 |
| Batting average | 4.50 | 2.33 | 4.00 |
| 100s/50s | 0/0 | 0/0 | 0/0 |
| Top score | 8 | 8* | 4* |
| Balls bowled | 300 | 1,316 | 1,188 |
| Wickets | 2 | 41 | 58 |
| Bowling average | 90.50 | 25.82 | 21.74 |
| 5 wickets in innings | 0 | 1 | 1 |
| 10 wickets in match | 0 | 0 | 0 |
| Best bowling | 1/30 | 5/29 | 5/15 |
| Catches/stumpings | –/– | 2/– | 6/– |
Medal record
Women's cricket
Representing India
ICC Cricket World Cup
| Winner | 2025 India |
Commonwealth Games
| Silver medal – second place | 2022 Birmingham |
Asian Games
| Gold medal – first place | Aichi–Nagoya 2026 |
ACC Asia Cup
| Winner | 2022 Bangladesh |
| Winner | 2026 UAE |
| Runner-up | 2024 Sri Lanka |
- Source: ESPNcricinfo, 3 November 2025

Renuka Singh Thakur (born 2 January 1996) is an Indian international cricketer. She represents Railways in domestic cricket and Gujarat Giants in the Women's Premier League. She was a part of the Indian team that won the 2025 Women's Cricket World Cup and the 2022 Women's Asia Cup.

== Career ==
Singh was the leading wicket-taker in the 2019–20 Senior Women's One Day League, with 23 dismissals. In August 2021, Singh earned her maiden call-up to the India women's cricket team, for their series against Australia. She made her Women's Twenty20 International debut on 7 October 2021, for India against Australia.

In January 2022, she was named in India's team for the 2022 Women's Cricket World Cup in New Zealand. She made her Women's One Day International (WODI) debut on 18 February 2022, for India against New Zealand.

In July 2022, she was named in India's team for the cricket tournament at the 2022 Commonwealth Games in Birmingham, England. She was the leading wicket-taker at the tournament, with 11 wickets, as well as winning a silver medal with her team. She took her first T20I five-wicket haul against England in the 2023 Women's T20 World Cup on 18 February 2023.

Thakur made her Test debut against England in December 2023. She was named in the India squad for the 2024 Women's T20 World Cup and their home ODI series against New Zealand in October 2024.

In December 2024, she took her first five-for in ODI against West Indies.
