= Tejal Hasabnis =

Indian cricketer (born 1997)

Personal information
- Full name: Tejal Sanjay Hasabnis
- Born: 16 August 1997 (age 29); Pune, Maharashtra, India
- Batting: Right-handed
- Bowling: Right-arm off break
- Role: Top order Batter

International information
- National side: India
- ODI debut (cap 146): 24 October 2024 v New Zealand
- Last ODI: 25 October 2026 v Zimbabwe
- ODI shirt no.: 23

Domestic team information
- Years: Team
- 2013–present: Maharashtra
- 2013–14: West Zone

Career statistics
Competition	WODI	WFC	WLA	WT20
Matches	6	9	79	71
Runs scored	140	298	1,920	1,237
Batting average	46.66	13.77	33.68	25.77
100s/50s	0/1	1/0	3/12	0/5
Top score	53*	169	148	71
Balls bowled	–	330	1,085	386
Wickets	–	3	25	13
Bowling average	–	40.00	26.96	27.84
5 wickets in innings	–	0	0	0
10 wickets in match	–	0	0	0
Best bowling	–	2/21	3/9	2/16
Catches/stumpings	1/–	7/–	22/–	20/–
- Source: ESPNcricinfo, 22 January 2020

Tejal Hasabnis (born 16 August 1997) is an Indian cricketer. She plays for Maharashtra and West Zone. In January 2019, she was named in India Green team for the 2018–19 Senior Women's Challenger Trophy.

== Career ==
She played first-class cricket for West Zone, List A cricket and Twenty20 cricket for Maharashtra and West Zone for Maharashtra.

In August 2024, she was named in the India A squad for the Australia tour. She scored three consecutive half centuries in unofficial ODIs against Australia A in that tour.

In October 2024, she was earned maiden call-up for national team for the series against New Zealand. She made her One Day International (ODI) debut in the first ODI of the same series on 24 October 2024. She scored her first half century in international cricket on 10 January 2025, when she scored an unbeaten 53 in the second ODI against Ireland.
