= Deepti Sharma =

Indian cricketer (born 1997)

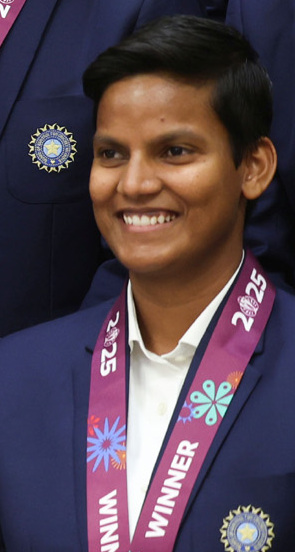
- Sharma in 2025

Personal information
- Full name: Deepti Bhagwan Sharma
- Born: 24 August 1997 (age 29); Agra, Uttar Pradesh, India
- Nickname: Deepu, Don Deepti
- Batting: Left-handed
- Bowling: Right-arm off break
- Role: All-rounder

International information
- National side: India (2014–present)
- Test debut (cap 87): 16 June 2021 v England
- Last Test: 10 July 2026 v England
- ODI debut (cap 114): 28 November 2014 v South Africa
- Last ODI: 28 October 2026 v Zimbabwe
- ODI shirt no.: 6
- T20I debut (cap 50): 31 January 2016 v Australia
- Last T20I: 20 October 2026 v Zimbabwe
- T20I shirt no.: 6

Domestic team information
- Years: Team
- 2014/15–2016/17, 2024/25–present: Uttar Pradesh
- 2017/18–2023/24: Bengal
- 2018–2020: Trailblazers
- 2019: Western Storm
- 2021, 2024: London Spirit
- 2021/22: Sydney Thunder
- 2022: Velocity
- 2023–present: UP Warriorz
- 2024/24: Melbourne Stars
- 2026–present: Sunrisers Leeds

Career statistics
Competition	WTest	WODI	WT20I
Matches	7	127	160
Runs scored	402	2,877	1,355
Batting average	44.66	37.36	22.21
100s/50s	0/5	2/18	0/2
Top score	78	188	64
Balls bowled	1,198	6,348	3,384
Wickets	25	171	191
Bowling average	19.00	27.40	18.26
5 wickets in innings	1	4	2
10 wickets in match	0	0	0
Best bowling	5/7	6/20	5/10
Catches/stumpings	3/–	42/–	46/–
Medal record
Women's cricket
Representing India
ICC Cricket World Cup
Winner	2025 India
Runner-up	2017 England & Wales
ICC T20 World Cup
Runner-up	2020 Australia
Commonwealth Games
Silver medal – second place	2022 Birmingham
Asian Games
Gold medal – first place	2022 Hangzhou
Gold medal – first place	2026 Aichi–Nagoya
ACC Asia Cup
Winner	2022 Bangladesh
Winner	2026 UAE
Runner-up	2018 Malaysia
Runner-up	2024 Sri Lanka
- Source: Cricinfo, 28 October 2026

Deepti Bhagwan Sharma (born 24 August 1997) is an Indian cricketer who plays for the Indian women's national team. She is an all-rounder who bats left-handed and bowls right-arm off break. She represents Uttar Pradesh in domestic cricket and plays for UP Warriorz in the Women's Premier League. Sharma was part of the team that won the 2025 Women's Cricket World Cup, 2022 Women's Asia Cup, and gold medals at the 2022 and 2026 Asian Games.

== Early and personal life ==
Deepti Sharma was born to Sushilaa and Bhagwan Sharma and is the youngest among her siblings. Her father, Bhagwan Sharma, is a retired Indian Railways employee. She developed an interest in cricket at the age of nine and would often accompany her brother, Sumit Sharma — a former Uttar Pradesh pacer who initially coached her — to watch practice sessions and matches. During one such session at the Ekalavya Sports Stadium in Agra, she reportedly made a direct hit on the stumps from a distance of about 50 metres, an incident noticed by then India women's national team selector Hemlata Kala.

In January 2025, Sharma was appointed as Deputy Superintendent of Police in Uttar Pradesh Police under the sports quota as part of the Skilled Athlete Scheme.

== Career ==
Sharma made her ODI International debut in 2014 against South Africa in Bengaluru. The match was part of the Women's Championship 2014/16.

Sharma was involved in a world record opening partnership of 320 runs with Poonam Raut, with the former contributing 188 runs. Thus, breaking both the standing women's record of 229 (by Sarah Taylor and Caroline Atkins of England) and the standing men's record in ODIs of 286 (by Upul Tharanga and Sanath Jayasuriya of Sri Lanka). This partnership helped the Indian team in scoring 358 for three in 50 overs against Ireland women at Potchefstroom during the quadrangular series which also included South Africa women and Zimbabwe women teams held in South Africa.

Sharma was part of the Indian team to reach the final of the 2017 Women's Cricket World Cup where the team lost to England by nine runs. She scored 216 runs from 8 matches at an average of 30.86 and picked up 12 wickets from 9 matches played with best bowling figures of 3 for 59 from 7.1 overs against Australia.

Sharma's bowling best figures in her career is 6-20 that she claimed in the final ODI against Sri Lanka at Ranchi.

The all-rounder was roped in to play for Bengal in Senior women's domestic season 2017–18, alongside Jhulan Goswami. She was the top run scorer in the season scoring 312 runs at an average of 104 in 6 matches with an impressive strike rate of 65.13.Her highest score was 77 and hit five half centuries. Deepti also picked up a total of 9 wickets with best figures of 3 for 26 against Vidarbha in Kolkata.

In the Senior women's domestic season 2018–19, Bengal is currently placed 2nd in the standings. She has scored 313 runs from 6 matches and currently in the top run scorer of the season. Sharma already has 2 centuries and one half century against her name in the 6 matches that she has played and highest score being 106 not out against Baroda in Bengaluru. She has also taken 13 wickets with best figures of 4 for 12 against Kerala in Bengaluru.

In October 2018, she was named in India's squad for the 2018 ICC Women's World Twenty20 tournament in the West Indies. The Indian team lost in the semi-finals against England by 8 wickets. She took only 5 wickets in the tournament with her best being 2 for 15 in 3 overs against Ireland.

In June 2018, she was awarded with the Jagmohan Dalmiya Trophy For Best Domestic Senior Women's Cricketer by the Board of Control for Cricket in India (BCCI).

In June 2019, she was signed up to play for the Western Storm in the Kia Super League. In January 2020, she was named in India's squad for the 2020 ICC Women's T20 World Cup in Australia. In 2021, she was drafted by London Spirit for the inaugural season of The Hundred.

In May 2021, she was named in India's Test squad for their one-off match against the England women's cricket team. Sharma made her Test debut on 16 June 2021, for India against England.

She plays for Sydney Thunder in the 2021 WBBL. In January 2022, she was named in India's team for the 2022 Women's Cricket World Cup in New Zealand. In July 2022, she was named in India's team for the cricket tournament at the 2022 Commonwealth Games in Birmingham, England.

Sharma was sold to UP Warriorz for Rs 2.6 crore at the Women's Premier League Auction in Mumbai on 13 February 2023. On 8 March 2024, she became the first Indian bowler to take a hat-trick in the WPL, against the Delhi Capitals. Sharma later received the Most Valuable Player (MVP) award in the 2024 season of the WPL.

She was named in the India squad for the 2024 ICC Women's T20 World Cup and their home ODI series against New Zealand in October 2024.

She was named in the India squad for the 2025 Women's Cricket World Cup and their home ODI series against Australia in September 2025.

She was named as Player of the Tournament in the 2025 Women's Cricket World Cup, and scored 215 runs and took 22 wickets in 9 matches, becoming the first cricketer (male or female) to record the double of 200 runs and 20 wickets in a single World Cup edition.

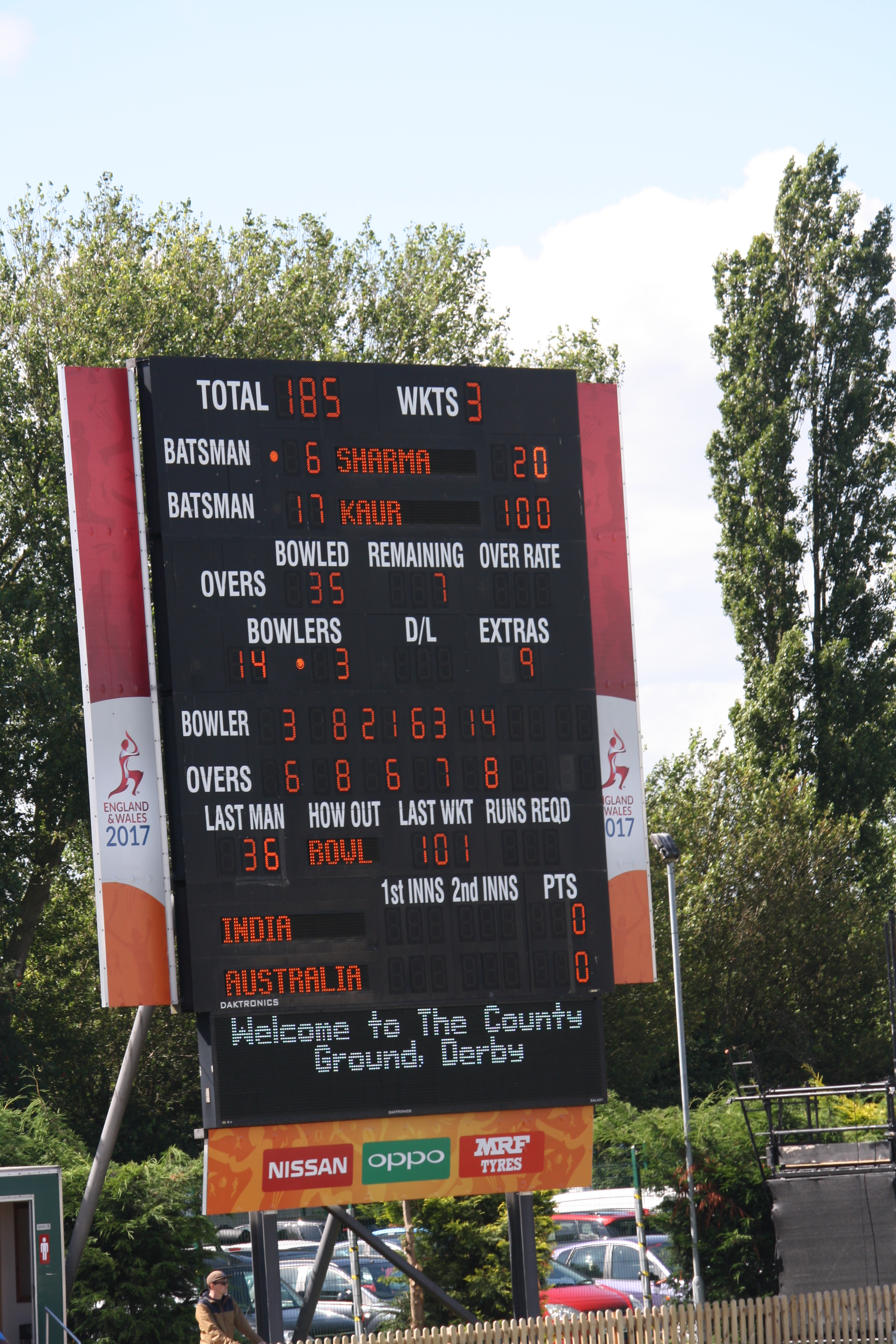
2017 Women's Cricket World Cup IMG 2720 (35301480724)
