= India women's national cricket team =

India
- Nickname: Women in Blue
- Association: Board of Control for Cricket in India

Personnel
- Captain: Smriti Mandhana
- Coach: Amol Muzumdar
- Bowling coach: Aavishkar Salvi
- Fielding coach: Munish Bali

History
- Test status acquired: 1976

International Cricket Council
- ICC status: Full member (1926)
- ICC region: Asia
ICC Rankings	Current	Best-ever
ODI	3^{rd}	2^{nd} (May 2020)
T20I	3^{rd}	3^{rd} (Nov 2019)

Tests
- First Test: v West Indies at the M. Chinnaswamy Stadium, Bangalore; 31 October – 2 November 1976
- Last Test: v England at Lord's, London; 10–13 July 2026
Tests	Played	Won/Lost
Total	43	9/7 (27 draws)
This year	2	1/1 (0 draws)

One Day Internationals
- First ODI: v England at Eden Gardens, Kolkata; 1 January 1978
- Last ODI: v Zimbabwe at Baroda Cricket Association Stadium, Vadodara; 28 October 2026
ODIs	Played	Won/Lost
Total	348	191/150 (2 ties, 5 no results)
This year	6	3/3 (0 ties, 0 no results)
- World Cup appearances: 11 (first in 1978)
- Best result: (gold) Champions (2025)

T20 Internationals
- First T20I: v England at the County Cricket Ground, Derby; 5 August 2006
- Last T20I: v Zimbabwe at Shaheed Veer Narayan Singh International Cricket Stadium, Raipur; 20 October 2026
T20Is	Played	Won/Lost
Total	236	134/95 (1 tie, 6 no results)
This year	27	18/9 (0 ties, 0 no results)
- T20 World Cup appearances: 8 (first in 2009)
- Best result: (silver) Runners-up (2020)
- Official website: bcci.tv
Test kit
ODI kit
T20I kit
- As of 28 October 2026

The India women's national cricket team represents India in international cricket. It is governed by the Board of Control for Cricket in India (BCCI) and is a full member of the International Cricket Council with Test, One Day International and Twenty20 International status. India are the current holders of the World Cup, the Asia Cup, and the Asian Games.

The team has played 43 Test matches, winning 9, losing 7, and with 27 ending in draws. Their first international match, on 31 October 1976, was a Test against the West Indies at the M. Chinnaswamy Stadium in Bangalore which ended in a draw.

The team has played 348 ODI matches, winning 191, losing 150, tying 2, and with 5 ending in a no-result. India has won the World Cup once in 2025. India has reached the World Cup final on three occasions, losing to Australia by 98 runs in 2005, and to England by 9 runs in 2017, and winning against South Africa by 52 runs in 2025. India have also won the ODI Asia Cup, a record four times in 2004, 2005-06, 2006, and 2008.

The team has played 236 T20I matches, winning 134, losing 95, tying 1, and with 6 ending in a no-result. India has reached the finals of the T20 World Cup once, losing to Australia by 85 runs in 2020. India have also won the T20I Asia Cup, a record four times in 2012, 2016, 2022, and 2026. In addition, India have also won golds at the Asian Games in 2022 and 2026, and won a silver at the Commonwealth Games in 2022.

== History ==
The British brought cricket to India in the early 1700s, with the first cricket match played in 1721. It was played and adopted by Kolis of Gujarat because they were sea pirates and outlaws who always looted the British ships, so the East India Company tried to manage the Kolis in cricket. The first Indian cricket club was established by the Parsi community in Bombay, in 1848; the club played their first match against the Europeans in 1877. In 1911, an Indian men's cricket team was formed and toured England, where they played English county teams. The India men's team made their Test debut against England in 1932. The first women's Test was played between England and Australia in 1934.

Women's cricket arrived in India much later; the Women's Cricket Association of India (WCAI) was formed in 1973. The Indian women's team played their first Test match in 1976, against the West Indies. India recorded its first-ever Test win in November 1976 against West Indies under Shantha Rangaswamy's captaincy at the Moin-ul-Haq Stadium in Patna.

The WCAI, the governing body for women's cricket, was affiliated to the International Women's Cricket Council. As part of the International Cricket Council's initiative to develop women's cricket, the Women's Cricket Association of India was merged with the Board of Control for Cricket in India in 2006/07.

In 2021, the BCCI announced that Ramesh Powar would become the Head Coach of the Indian Women's Cricket Team. In 2022, Indian Women script history by winning 1st series on England soil in 23 years.

In July 2025, India clinched their first-ever Women's T20I series win against England, securing an unassailable 3–1 lead in the five-match series. The landmark victory came in the fourth T20I at Worcester, where Indian spinners Radha Yadav, Deepti Sharma, and newcomer Shree Charani restricted England to 126/7. Openers Shafali Verma and Smriti Mandhana set up a comfortable six-wicket chase, finished with 18 balls to spare. The win marked a historic breakthrough, as India had never previously won a T20I series against England, either home or away. The performance, highlighted by disciplined bowling and sharp fielding, also served as vital preparation ahead of the 2026 Women's T20 World Cup in England.

In November 2025, India won their first Women's Cricket World Cup, defeating South Africa by 52 runs in the final at the DY Patil Stadium in Navi Mumbai. In the semi-final, they chased a huge target of 339 runs against Australia, which is one also the highest successful run chases in the history of Women's ODI. The victory was widely celebrated and recognized across India as a landmark moment for women's cricket in the country.

== Governing body ==
The Board of Control for Cricket in India (BCCI) is the governing body for the Indian cricket team and first-class cricket in India. The Board has been operating since 1928 and represents India at the International Cricket Council. It is amongst the richest sporting organisations in the world. It sold media rights for India's matches from 2006 to 2010 for US$612,000,000. It manages the Indian team's sponsorships, its future tours and team selection. The International Cricket Council (ICC) determines India's upcoming matches through its future tours program.

=== Selection Committee ===
On 28 September 2025, the Board of Control for Cricket in India (BCCI) announced the appointment of new All-India Women's Selection Committee. Amita Sharma, former indian right-arm medium fast bowler, heads the five-member selection committee.

- Amita Sharma (chief selector)
- Shyama Dey
- Jaya Sharma
- Sulakshana Naik
- Sravanthi Naidu

== Sponsorship ==
Duration	Manufacturer	Sponsor	Ref
1993–1996		Wills	
1999–2001		Wills	
2001–2002			
2002–2003		Sahara	
2003–2005		Sahara	
2005–2013	Nike	Sahara	
2014–2017	Nike	Star India	
2017–2019	Nike	Oppo	
2019–2020	Nike	Byju's	
2020–2023	MPL Sports	Byju's	
2023–2025	Adidas	Dream11	
2025–present	Adidas	Apollo Tyres	

== Gallery ==
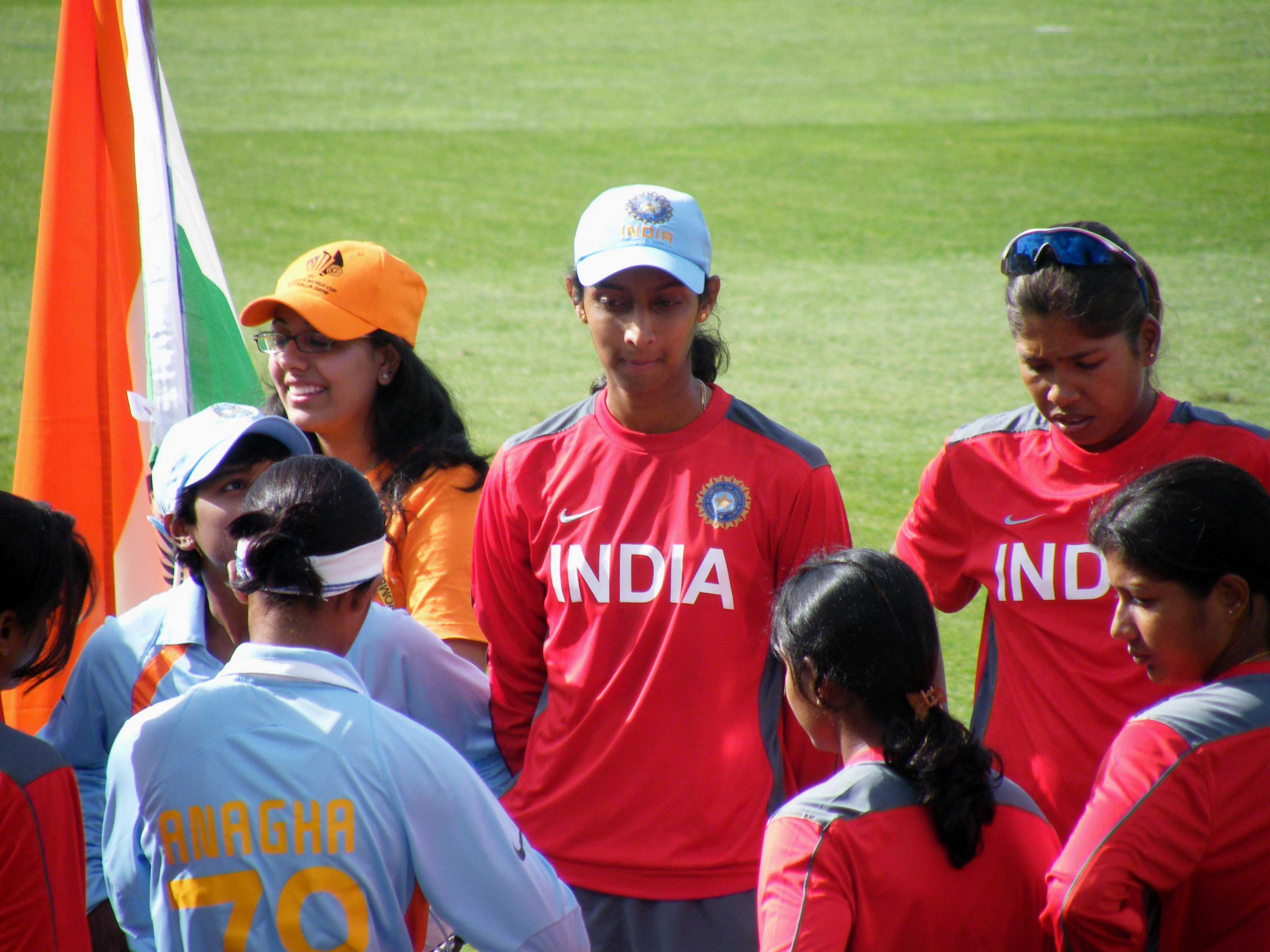
Members of the Indian cricket team before a Women's Cricket World Cup game in Sydney.

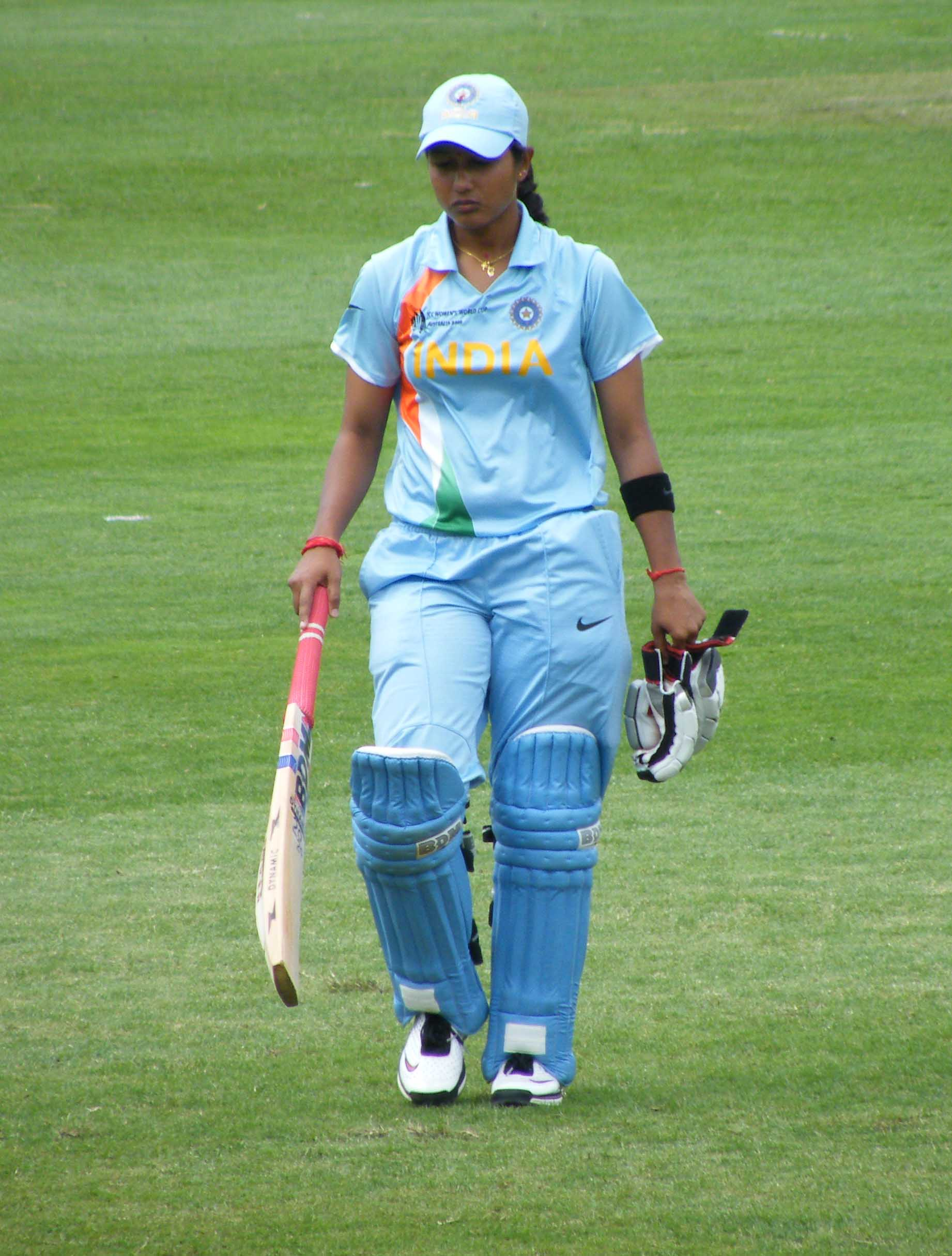
Indian batter at the 2010 Women's Cricket World Cup.

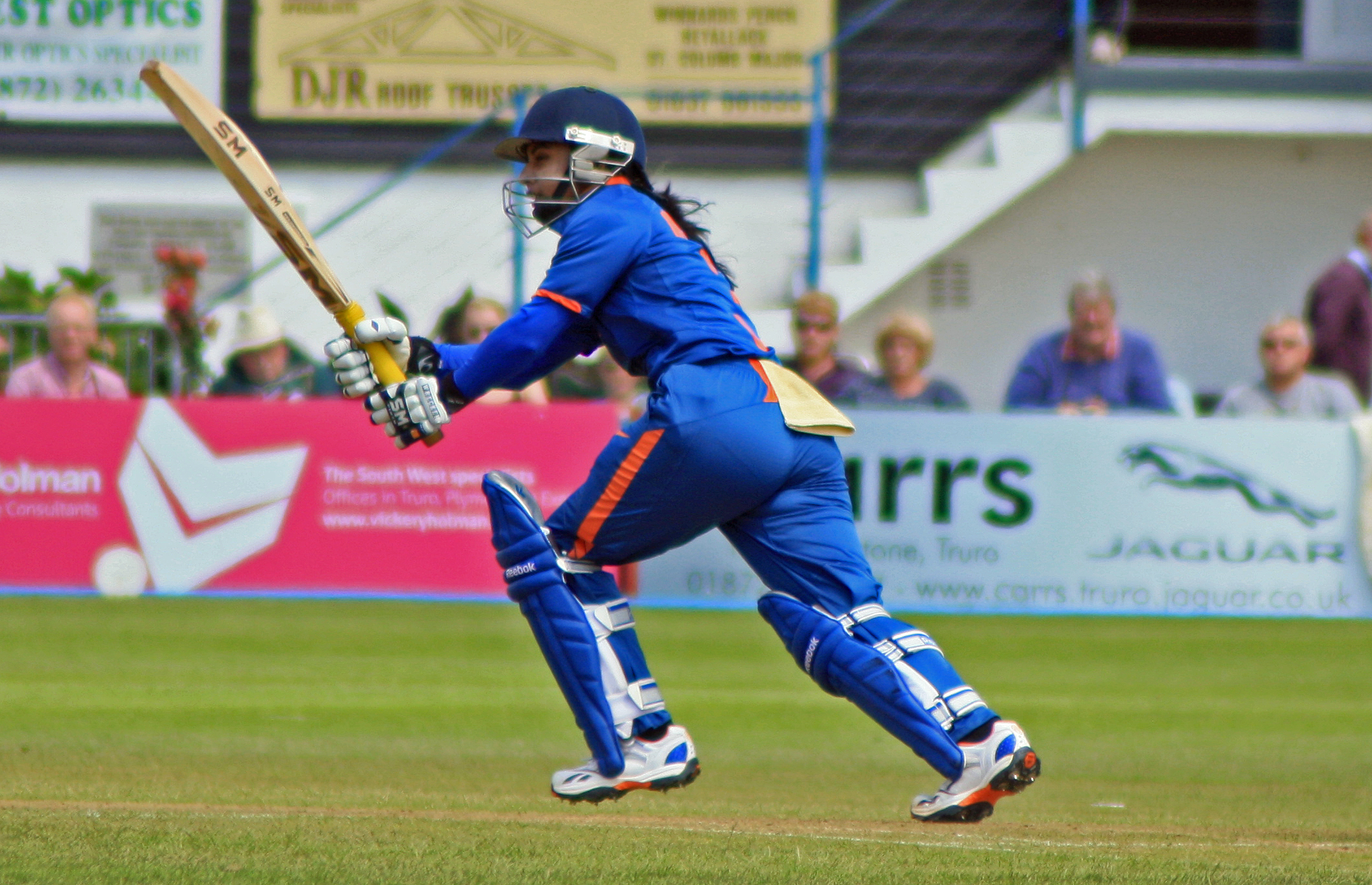
Mithali Raj, former captain of the Indian women's cricket team.

== Current squad ==
This lists all the active players who played for India in the last 12 months or were named in the recent Test, ODI or T20I squads. Uncapped players are listed in italics.

As of 13 July 2026

Key

Symbol	Meaning
S/N	Shirt number of the player in all formats
Format	Denotes the player's playing format

S/N	Name	Age	Batting style	Bowling style	Domestic team	Forms
Batters
23	Harmanpreet Kaur	37	Right-handed	Right-arm off break	Punjab	Test, ODI & T20I
18	Smriti Mandhana (C)	30	Left-handed	Right-arm medium	Maharashtra	Test, ODI & T20I
5	Jemimah Rodrigues	26	Right-handed	Right-arm off break	Mumbai	Test, ODI & T20I
64	Pratika Rawal	24	Right-handed	Right-arm Off spin	Railways	Test & ODI
45	Bharti Fulmali	31	Right-handed	Right-arm medium	Vidarbha	T20I
16	Priya Punia	30	Right-handed	Right-arm medium	Delhi	Test
23	Tejal Hasabnis	29	Right-handed	Right-arm off break	Maharashtra	ODI
	All-rounders					
6	Deepti Sharma	29	Left-handed	Right-arm off break	Uttar Pradesh	Test, ODI & T20I
2	Sneh Rana	32	Right-handed	Right-arm off break	Railways	Test, ODI
17	Shafali Verma	22	Right-handed	Right-arm off break	Haryana	Test, ODI & T20I
47	Sayali Satghare	26	Right-handed	Right-arm medium	Mumbai	Test
81	Kashvee Gautam	23	Right-handed	Right-arm medium	Chandigarh	ODI
33	Harleen Deol	28	Right-handed	Right-arm leg break	Himachal Pradesh	Test & ODI
30	Amanjot Kaur	26	Right-handed	Right-arm medium	Punjab	ODI & T20I
20	Arundhati Reddy	29	Right-handed	Right-arm medium	Kerala	T20I
21	Radha Yadav	26	Right-handed	Left-arm orthodox	Baroda	T20I
58	Nandani Sharma	25	Right-handed	Right-arm medium	Chandigarh	Test & T20I
	Wicket-keepers					
13	Richa Ghosh	23	Right-handed	—N/a	Bengal	Test, ODI & T20I
11	Yastika Bhatia	26	Left-handed	—N/a	Baroda	Test & T20I
55	Uma Chetry	24	Right-handed	—N/a	Assam	ODI
16	G Kamalini	18	Left-handed	—N/a	Tamil Nadu	ODI
	Spin bowlers					
4	Shree Charani	22	Left-handed	Left-arm slow orthodox	Andhra	Test, ODI & T20I
31	Shreyanka Patil	24	Right-handed	Right-arm off break	Karnataka	T20I
2	Vaishnavi Sharma	20	Right-handed	Left-arm slow orthodox	Madhya Pradesh	ODI
28	Prema Rawat	24	Right-handed	Right-arm leg break	Uttarakhand	T20I
	Pace bowlers					
26	Kranti Gaud	23	Right-handed	Right-arm medium-fast	Madhya Pradesh	Test, ODI & T20I
10	Renuka Singh Thakur	30	Right-handed	Right-arm medium-fast	Railways	Test, ODI & T20I

Match fees

Players also receive a match fee of ₹15 lakh (US$16,000) per Test match, ₹6 lakh (US$6,200) per ODI, and ₹3 lakh (US$3,100) per T20I. The BCCI adopted a pay equity policy in match fees for men's and women's teams on 27 October 2022.

== Coaching staff ==
Position	Name
Head coach & Batting coach	Amol Muzumdar
Bowling coach	Aavishkar Salvi
Fielding coach	Munish Bali
Team Manager	Niranjan Godbole
Nets Trainers	Tanveer Shukla
Nets Trainers	Sourav Tyagi
Nets Trainers	Utkarsh Singh
Nets Trainers	Akhil S Prasad
Physiotherapist	Akanksha Satyavanshi
Physiotherapist	Neha Karnik
Fitness Trainer	Anand Date
Analyst	Aniruddha Deshpande

== Tournament history ==
A red box around the year indicates tournaments played within India

Key
Champions
Runners-up
Semi-finals

=== Cricket World Cup ===
Year	Round	Position	Played	Won	Lost	Tie	NR
(England) 1973	Did not participate						
(India) 1978	Group Stage	4/4	3	0	3	0	0
(New Zealand) 1982	Group Stage	4/5	12	4	8	0	0
(Australia) 1988	Did not participate						
(England) 1993	Group Stage	4/8	7	4	3	0	0
(India) 1997	Semi Finals	4/11	5	3	1	1	0
(New Zealand) 2000	Semi Finals	3/8	8	5	3	0	0
(South Africa) 2005	Runners Up	2/8	8	5	2	0	1
(Australia) 2009	Super 6s	3/6	7	5	2	0	0
(India) 2013	Group Stage	7/8	4	2	2	0	0
(England) 2017	Runners Up	2/8	9	6	3	0	0
(New Zealand) 2022	Group Stage	5/8	7	3	4	0	0
(India) 2025	Champions	1/8	9	5	3	0	1
Total	1 title	11/13	79	42	34	1	2

=== T20 World Cup ===
Year	Position	Played	Won	Lost	Tie	NR
(England) 2009	Semi Finals	4	2	2	0	0
(Cricket West Indies) 2010	Semi Finals	4	2	2	0	0
(Sri Lanka) 2012	Group Stage	4	1	3	0	0
(Bangladesh) 2014	Group Stage	5	3	2	0	0
(India) 2016	Group Stage	4	1	3	0	0
(Cricket West Indies) 2018	Semi Finals	5	4	1	0	0
(Australia) 2020	Runners Up	6	4	1	0	1
(South Africa) 2023	Semi Finals	5	3	2	0	0
(United Arab Emirates) 2024	Group Stage	4	2	2	0	0
(England) 2026	Group Stage	5	3	2	0	0
Total	0 titles	41	22	18	0	1

=== Olympic Games ===
Year	Round	Position	Played	Won	Lost	Tie	NR
(United States) 2028							
Total							

=== Champions Trophy ===
Year	Position	Played	Won	Lost	Tie	NR
(India) 2027						
Total						

=== ICC Women's Championship ===
Year	Round	Position	GP	W	L	D	NR
2014-16	Group stage (Note: Advance To 2017 Women's Cricket World Cup Qualifier.)	5/8	21	9	11	0	1
2017-20	Group stage (Note: Advance To 2022 Women's Cricket World Cup.)	4/8	21	10	8	0	3
2022-25	Group stage (Note: Advance To 2025 Women's Cricket World Cup.)	2/10	24	18	6	0	0
Total	3/3	0 titles	66	37	25	0	4

=== Commonwealth Games ===
Year	Round	Position	Played	Won	Lost	Tie	NR
(England) 2022	Silver	2/8	5	3	2	0	0
Total	0 Title	1/1	5	3	2	0	0

=== Asian Games ===
Year	Round	Position	Played	Won	Lost	Tie	NR
(China) 2010	Did not participate						
(South Korea) 2014	Did not participate						
(China) 2022	Gold	1/9	3	2	0	0	1
(Japan) 2026	Gold	1/8	3	3	0	0	0
Total	2 Titles	2/2	6	5	0	0	1

=== Asia Cup ===
Year	Round	Position	Played	Won	Lost	Tie	NR
(Sri Lanka) 2004	Champions	1/2	5	5	0	0	0
(Pakistan) 2005–06	Champions	1/3	5	5	0	0	0
(India) 2006	Champions	1/3	5	5	0	0	0
(Sri Lanka) 2008	Champions	1/4	7	7	0	0	0
(China) 2012	Champions	1/8	4	4	0	0	0
(Thailand) 2016	Champions	1/6	6	6	0	0	0
(Malaysia) 2018	Runners Up	2/6	6	4	2	0	0
(Bangladesh) 2022	Champions	1/7	8	7	1	0	0
(Sri Lanka) 2024	Runners Up	2/8	5	4	1	0	0
(United Arab Emirates) 2026	Champions	1/8	5	5	0	0	0
Total	8 titles	10/10	56	52	4	0	0

=== South Asian Games ===
Year	Round	Position	Played	Won	Lost	Tie	NR
(Bangladesh) 2016	Did not participate						
(Nepal) 2019	Did not participate						
(Pakistan) 2027	TBA						
Total	0 Titles	0/0	0	0	0	0	0

== Honours ==
India women's national cricket team honours
Type	Competition	Titles	Seasons
ICC Championships	Women's Cricket World Cup	1	Champions (1): 2025; Runners-up (2): 2005, 2017
ICC Championships	Women's T20 World Cup	–	Runners-up (1): 2020
ACC (Continental)	Women's Asia Cup	8	Champions (8): 2004, 2005–06, 2006, 2008, 2012, 2016, 2022, 2026; Runners-up (2): 2018, 2024
Multi-sport	Asian Games	2	Gold medal (2): 2022, 2026
Multi-sport	Commonwealth Games	–	Silver medal (1): 2022

record

== Statistics ==
Won more matches than lost
All matches drawn/tied/no result
Won equal matches to lost
Lost more matches than won

=== Test cricket ===
Opponent	M	W	L	D	Win%	Loss%	Draw%	First	Last
Australia	12	1	5	6	8.33	41.66	50.00	1977	2026
England	16	4	1	11	25.00	6.25	68.75	1986	2026
New Zealand	6	0	0	6	0.00	0.00	100.00	1977	2003
South Africa	3	3	0	0	100.00	0.00	0.00	2002	2024
West Indies	6	1	1	4	16.66	16.66	66.66	1976	1976
**Total**	**43**	**9**	**7**	**27**	**20.93**	**16.28**	**62.79**	**1976**	**2026**
Statistics are correct as of India v England at Lord's, London, 13 July 2026

Most Test runs for India

Player	Runs	Average
Sandhya Agarwal	1,110	50.45
**Smriti Mandhana**	788	52.53
Shanta Rangaswamy	750	32.60
Shubhangi Kulkarni	700	23.33
Mithali Raj	699	43.68
**Shafali Verma**	640	49.23
Gargi Banerji	614	27.90
Sudha Shah	601	18.78
Anjum Chopra	548	30.44
Hemlata Kala	503	50.30

Most Test wickets for India

Player	Wickets	Average
Diana Edulji	63	25.77
Shubhangi Kulkarni	60	27.45
Jhulan Goswami	44	17.36
Neetu David	41	18.90
**Sneh Rana**	30	20.96
**Deepti Sharma**	25	19.00
Shashi Gupta	25	31.28
Shanta Rangaswamy	21	31.61
Sharmila Chakraborty	19	22.10
Purnima Rau	15	21.26

Players in bold text are still active with India.

- Highest team total: 603/6d v South Africa, 29 June 2024 at M. A. Chidambaram Stadium, Chennai
- Highest individual score: 214, Mithali Raj v England, 14 August 2002 at County Ground, Taunton, England
- Best innings bowling: 8/53, Neetu David v England, 24 November 1995 at Jamshedpur, India
- Best match bowling: 10/78, Jhulan Goswami v England, 29 August 2006 at County Ground, Taunton, England

=== One Day Internationals ===
Opponent	M	W	L	T	NR	Win%	First	Last
**ICC Full members**
Australia	64	12	52	0	0	18.75	1978	2026
Bangladesh	9	6	1	1	1	75.00	2013	2025
England	80	36	42	0	2	45.00	1978	2025
Ireland	15	15	0	0	0	100.00	1993	2025
New Zealand	58	23	34	1	0	39.66	1978	2025
Pakistan	12	12	0	0	0	100.00	2005	2025
South Africa	35	21	13	0	1	60.00	1997	2025
Sri Lanka	36	32	3	0	1	88.89	2000	2025
West Indies	29	24	5	0	0	82.76	1993	2024
Zimbabwe	3	3	0	0	0	100.00	2026	2026
**ICC Associate members**
Denmark	1	1	0	0	0	100.00	1993	1993
International XI	3	3	0	0	0	100.00	1982	1982
Netherlands	3	3	0	0	0	100.00	1993	2000
**Total**	**348**	**191**	**150**	**2**	**5**	**55.97**	**1978**	**2026**
Statistics are correct as of India v Zimbabwe at Baroda Cricket Association Stadium, Vadodara, 28 October 2026

Most ODI runs for India

Player	Runs	Average
Mithali Raj	7,805	50.68
**Smriti Mandhana**	5,443	47.33
**Harmanpreet Kaur**	4,667	37.94
**Deepti Sharma**	2,877	37.36
Anjum Chopra	2,856	31.38
Punam Raut	2,299	34.83
Jaya Sharma	2,091	30.75
**Jemimah Rodrigues**	1,810	34.15
Anju Jain	1,729	29.81
**Pratika Rawal**	1,409	54.19

Most ODI wickets for India

Player	Wickets	Average
Jhulan Goswami	255	22.04
**Deepti Sharma**	171	27.33
Neetu David	141	16.34
Nooshin Al Khadeer	100	24.02
Rajeshwari Gayakwad	99	20.79
Ekta Bisht	98	21.83
Amita Sharma	87	35.52
Poonam Yadav	80	25.15
Shikha Pandey	75	21.92
Gouher Sultana	66	19.39

Players in bold text are still active with India.

- Highest team total: 435/5 v Ireland, 15 Jan 2025 at Niranjan Shah Stadium, India
- Highest individual score: 188, Deepti Sharma v Ireland, 15 May 2017 at Senwes Park, South Africa
- Best innings bowling: 6/10, Mamatha Maben v Sri Lanka, 25 April 2004 at Asgiriya Stadium, Sri Lanka

=== Twenty20 Internationals ===
Opponent	M	W	L	T	Tie+W	Tie+L	NR	Win%	First	Last
**ICC Full members**
Australia	39	9	28	0	1	0	1	23.08	2008	2026
Bangladesh	26	23	3	0	0	0	0	88.46	2013	2026
Barbados	1	1	0	0	0	0	0	100.00	2022	2022
England	38	12	26	0	0	0	0	31.58	2006	2026
Ireland	2	2	0	0	0	0	0	100.00	2018	2023
New Zealand	14	4	10	0	0	0	0	28.57	2009	2024
Pakistan	18	15	3	0	0	0	0	83.33	2009	2026
South Africa	25	11	11	0	0	0	3	44	2014	2026
Sri Lanka	33	27	5	0	0	0	1	84.37	2009	2026
West Indies	24	15	9	0	0	0	0	62.50	2011	2024
Zimbabwe	3	3	0	0	0	0	0	100.00	2026	2026
**ICC Associate members**
Hong Kong	1	1	0	0	0	0	0	100.00	2026	2026
Japan	1	1	0	0	0	0	0	100.00	2026	2026
Malaysia	3	2	0	0	0	0	1	66.67	2018	2023
Nepal	1	1	0	0	0	0	0	100	2024	2024
Netherlands	1	1	0	0	0	0	0	100	2026	2026
Thailand	4	4	0	0	0	0	0	100	2018	2026
United Arab Emirates	2	2	0	0	0	0	0	100	2022	2024
**Total**	**236**	**134**	**95**	**0**	**1**	**0**	**6**	**58.69**	**2006**	**2026**
Statistics are correct as of India v Zimbabwe at Shaheed Veer Narayan Singh International Cricket Stadium, Raipur, 20 October 2026

Most T20I runs for India

Player	Runs	Average
**Smriti Mandhana**	4,923	31.15
**Harmanpreet Kaur**	4,438	30.60
**Shafali Verma**	3,453	30.55
**Jemimah Rodrigues**	2,824	29.41
Mithali Raj	2,364	37.52
**Richa Ghosh**	1,453	25.94
**Deepti Sharma**	1,355	22.21
Veda Krishnamurthy	875	18.61
Punam Raut	719	27.65
Jhulan Goswami	405	10.94

Most T20I wickets for India

Player	Wickets	Average
**Deepti Sharma**	191	18.26
**Radha Yadav**	106	19.04
Poonam Yadav	98	15.25
**Renuka Singh**	70	22.50
**Shree Charani**	64	12.71
Rajeshwari Gayakwad	61	19.13
Pooja Vastrakar	58	21.41
Jhulan Goswami	56	21.94
Ekta Bisht	53	14.71
**Arundhati Reddy**	50	29.50

Players in bold text are still active with India.

• Highest team total: 221/2 v SL, 28 December 2025 at Greenfield Stadium, India

• Highest individual score: 124, Smriti Mandhana v Hong Kong, 3 September 2026 at Dubai International Cricket Stadium, United Arab Emirates

• Best innings bowling: 5/10, Deepti Sharma v Pakistan, 14 June 2026 at Edgbaston Cricket Ground, Birmingham

== See also ==
- India men's national cricket team
- India national under-19 cricket team
- India women's national under-19 cricket team
- India A cricket team
- India B cricket team
- Board of control for cricket in india (BCCI)
- BCCI Awards
- National Cricket Academy (NCA)
- Cricket in India
- Sport in India – Overview of sports in India
- Glossary of cricket terms
