= India women's cricket team in England in 2026 =

International cricket tour

	England	India
- Dates: 28 May – 13 July 2026
Captains	Nat Sciver-Brunt (Test); Charlie Dean (T20Is)	Harmanpreet Kaur (Note: Smriti Mandhana captained India in the 1st T20I.)

Test series
- Result: India won the 1-match series 1–0
Most runs	Amy Jones (106)	Smriti Mandhana (153)
Most wickets	Sophie Ecclestone (8)	Kranti Gaud (7)

Twenty20 International series
- Results: England won the 3-match series 2–1
Most runs	Alice Capsey (116)	Yastika Bhatia (119)
Most wickets	Lauren Bell (7)	Shree Charani (4); Kranti Gaud (4)
- Player of the series: Alice Capsey (Eng)

The India women's cricket team toured England in May and June 2026 to play three Twenty20 International (T20I) matches against the England women's cricket team. The matches served as preparation for both teams ahead of the 2026 Women's T20 World Cup. Following the T20 World Cup, the teams played a one-off Test match in July 2026 at Lord's in London. The Test match ran alongside the men's series between England and India. In July 2025, the England and Wales Cricket Board (ECB) confirmed the fixtures for the tour, as a part of the 2026 home international season.

== Squads ==
England		India	
Test	T20Is	Test	T20Is
Nat Sciver-Brunt (c); Tammy Beaumont; Lauren Bell; Maia Bouchier; Alice Capsey; Tilly Corteen-Coleman; Sophie Ecclestone; Lauren Filer; Amy Jones (wk); Heather Knight; Emma Lamb; Grace Potts; Ellie Threlkeld; Mady Villiers; Issy Wong	Charlie Dean (c); ~~Nat Sciver-Brunt (c)~~; Lauren Bell; Maia Bouchier; Alice Capsey; Tilly Corteen-Coleman; Sophia Dunkley; Sophie Ecclestone; Lauren Filer; Dani Gibson; Amy Jones (wk); Freya Kemp; Heather Knight; Charis Pavely; Linsey Smith; Issy Wong; Danni Wyatt-Hodge	Harmanpreet Kaur (c); Smriti Mandhana (vc); Yastika Bhatia (wk); Shree Charani; Harleen Deol; Kranti Gaud; Richa Ghosh (wk); Priya Punia; Sneh Rana; ~~Pratika Rawal~~; Jemimah Rodrigues; Sayali Satghare; Deepti Sharma; Nandani Sharma; Renuka Singh; Shafali Verma	Harmanpreet Kaur (c); Smriti Mandhana (vc); Yastika Bhatia (wk); Shree Charani; Bharti Fulmali; Kranti Gaud; Richa Ghosh (wk); Shreyanka Patil; Arundhati Reddy; Jemimah Rodrigues; Deepti Sharma; Nandani Sharma; Renuka Singh; Shafali Verma; Radha Yadav

On 19 May, Nat Sciver-Brunt was ruled out of the T20I series due to ongoing rehabilitation from a calf injury, with Maia Bouchier and Charis Pavely added as cover.

On 8 July, Pratika Rawal was ruled out of the Test due to a laceration injury around her right knee, with Priya Punia added into the squad.

== Tour match ==
25 May 2026
11:00
Cricinfo
BBC Sport

ECB Development Women's XI; 154/6 (20 overs)	v	India; 158/3 (16.2 overs)
Florence Miller 48 (41); Arundhati Reddy 3/29 (3 overs)		Shafali Verma 50 (25); Ellie Anderson 1/20 (2 overs)

India won by 7 wickets
County Ground Chelmsford
Umpires: Rose Fernando (SL) and James Tredwell (Eng)

- India won the toss and elected to field.
- India chased the target in 16.2 overs, losing 3 wickets, though they batted all allotted 20 overs.

== T20I series ==
=== 1st T20I ===
28 May 2026
18:30 (N)
Scorecard

India; 188/7 (20 overs)	v	England; 150/8 (20 overs)
Jemimah Rodrigues 69 (40); Lauren Bell 3/34 (4 overs)		Amy Jones 67 (48); Nandani Sharma 3/34 (4 overs)

India won by 38 runs
County Ground, Chelmsford
Umpires: Ian Blackwell (Eng) and Anna Harris (Eng)
Player of the match: Jemimah Rodrigues (Ind)

- England won the toss and elected to field.
- Tilly Corteen-Coleman (Eng) and Nandani Sharma (Ind) both made their T20I debuts.

=== 2nd T20I ===
30 May 2026
14:30
Scorecard

England; 168/5 (20 overs)	v	India; 142/9 (20 overs)
Freya Kemp 39* (13); Shree Charani 3/25 (4 overs)		Yastika Bhatia 33 (36); Freya Kemp 2/15 (2 overs)

England won by 26 runs
County Ground, Bristol
Umpires: Rose Fernando (SL) and Anna Harris (Eng)
Player of the match: Freya Kemp (Eng)

- England won the toss and elected to bat.
- Harmanpreet Kaur (Ind) scored her 4,000th run in T20Is.

=== 3rd T20I ===
2 June 2026
18:30 (N)
Scorecard

India; 180/5 (20 overs)	v	England; 184/4 (18.3 overs)
Harmanpreet Kaur 56* (40); Lauren Bell 2/36 (4 overs)		Alice Capsey 82 (43); Arundhati Reddy 2/31 (4 overs)

England won by 6 wickets
County Ground, Taunton
Umpires: Ian Blackwell (Eng) and Sue Redfern (Eng)
Player of the match: Alice Capsey (Eng)

- England won the toss and elected to field.

== Only Test ==
10–13 July 2026
Scorecard

India	v	England
285 (74.5 overs); Smriti Mandhana 83 (108); Sophie Ecclestone 3/68 (21.5 overs)		170 (59.1 overs); Amy Jones 52 (62); Kranti Gaud 5/37 (17 overs)
341/7d (86.3 overs); Yastika Bhatia 113 (158); Sophie Ecclestone 5/118 (33.3 overs)		186 (62.5 overs); Amy Jones 54 (80); Sneh Rana 4/42 (19.5 overs)

India won by 270 runs
Lord's, London
Umpires: Anna Harris (Eng) and Sue Redfern (Eng)
Player of the match: Kranti Gaud (Ind)

- England won the toss and elected to field.
- Alice Capsey, Mady Villiers (Eng) and Shree Charani (Ind) all made their Test debuts.
- This was the first women's Test to be played at this venue.
- Kranti Gaud (Ind) took her maiden five-wicket haul in Tests.
- Tammy Beaumont and Heather Knight (Eng) played in their last Test matches.
- Yastika Bhatia (Ind) scored her maiden century in Tests.
