= India women's cricket team in England in 2025 =

International cricket tour

| | England | India |
- Dates: 28 June – 22 July 2025
| Captains | Nat Sciver-Brunt (1st & 2nd T20I); Tammy Beaumont (3rd, 4th & 5th T20I) | Harmanpreet Kaur (Note: Smriti Mandhana captained India in the 1st T20I.) |

One Day International series
- Results: India won the 3-match series 2–1
| Most runs | Nat Sciver-Brunt (160) | Harmanpreet Kaur (126) |
| Most wickets | Sophie Ecclestone (5) | Kranti Goud (9) |
- Player of the series: Harmanpreet Kaur (Ind)

Twenty20 International series
- Results: India won the 5-match series 3–2
| Most runs | Sophia Dunkley (151) | Smriti Mandhana (221) |
| Most wickets | Lauren Bell (6) | Shree Charani (10) |
- Player of the series: Shree Charani (Ind)

The India women's cricket team toured England in June and July 2025 to play the England women's cricket team. The tour consisted of three One Day International (ODI) and five Twenty20 International (T20I) matches. In August 2024, the England and Wales Cricket Board (ECB) confirmed the fixtures for the tour, as a part of the 2025 home international season. The series ran alongside the men's series between England and India.

India won the first T20I by 97 runs with Smriti Mandhana scored maiden century in T20Is. The tourists won the second T20I comfortably 24 runs with Amanjot Kaur and Jemimah Rodrigues, both scoring 63 runs each and lead the series 2-0. The hosts won the third T20I by five runs in thriller to keep series alive. India won the fourth T20I by six wickets in a low scoring game and secured first ever T20I series victory over England. The hosts won the fifth and final T20I by five wickets in final ball thriller.

India won the first ODI by four wickets with Deepti Sharma scored unbeaten 62 runs. The hosts won the rain-hit second game by eight wickets and level the series. The tourists won the third and last ODI by 13 runs with the captain Harmanpreet Kaur scored her 7th ODI century (102) and Kranti Goud took her maiden ODI five-wicket haul (6/52) and India won the series 2-1.

== Squads ==
| England | | India | |
| ODIs | T20Is | ODIs | T20Is |
|---|---|---|---|
| Nat Sciver-Brunt (c); Emily Arlott; Tammy Beaumont; Lauren Bell; Maia Bouchier; Alice Capsey (Note: In squad for first and second ODI only.); Kate Cross; Alice Davidson-Richards; Charlie Dean; Sophia Dunkley; Sophie Ecclestone; Lauren Filer; Amy Jones; Emma Lamb; Linsey Smith | Nat Sciver-Brunt (c) (Note: In squad for first and second T20I only.); Emily Arlott; Tammy Beaumont; Lauren Bell; Maia Bouchier (Note: In squad for fourth and fifth T20I only.); Alice Capsey; Charlie Dean; Sophia Dunkley; Sophie Ecclestone; Lauren Filer; Amy Jones; Paige Scholfield; Linsey Smith; Issy Wong; Danni Wyatt-Hodge | Harmanpreet Kaur (c); Smriti Mandhana (vc); Yastika Bhatia (wk); Shree Charani; Harleen Deol; Kranti Goud; Richa Ghosh (wk); Tejal Hasabnis; Amanjot Kaur; Sneh Rana; Pratika Rawal; Arundhati Reddy; Jemimah Rodrigues; Sayali Satghare; Deepti Sharma; ~~Shuchi Upadhyay~~; Radha Yadav | Harmanpreet Kaur (c); Smriti Mandhana (vc); Yastika Bhatia (wk); Shree Charani; Harleen Deol; Kranti Goud; Richa Ghosh (wk); Amanjot Kaur; Sneh Rana; Arundhati Reddy; Jemimah Rodrigues; Sayali Satghare; Deepti Sharma; ~~Shuchi Upadhyay~~; Shafali Verma; Radha Yadav |

On 12 June, Radha Yadav was added into the squad as a replacement for Shuchi Upadhyay who was ruled out due to a left shin injury. Smriti Mandhana captained the Indian side for the first T20I as Harmanpreet Kaur was ruled out due to a head injury faced during the warm-up match.

On 5 July, Nat Sciver-Brunt was ruled out of the remainder match of the T20I series due to a groin injury, with Maia Bouchier named her replacement. On 22 July, Alice Capsey was released from the ODI squad to her domestic team to play Women's One-Day Cup.

== Tour matches ==
50-over match
24 June 2025
11:00
Scorecard

| ECB Development XI; 353/5 (50 overs) | v | India; 335/9 (50 overs) |
| Maia Bouchier 104* (84); Shree Charani 3/71 (9 overs) | | Harleen Deol 100* (91); Ryana MacDonald-Gay 2/55 (10 overs) |

ECB Development XI won by 18 runs
County Cricket Ground, Beckenham
Umpires: Rose Fernando (Eng) and James Tredwell (Eng)

- India won the toss and elected to field.

20-over match
25 June 2025
11:00
Scorecard

| ECB Development XI; 194/8 (20 overs) | v | India; 188/8 (20 overs) |
| Bryony Smith 62 (33); Sneh Rana 2/28 (3 overs) | | Smriti Mandhana 47 (28); Sarah Glenn 3/29 (4 overs) |

ECB Development XI won by 6 runs
County Cricket Ground, Beckenham
Umpires: Rose Fernando (Eng) and James Tredwell (Eng)

- ECB Development XI won the toss and elected to bat.

== T20I series ==
=== 1st T20I ===
28 June 2025
14:30
Scorecard

| India; 210/5 (20 overs) | v | England; 113 (14.5 overs) |
| Smriti Mandhana 112 (62); Lauren Bell 3/27 (4 overs) | | Nat Sciver-Brunt 66 (42); Shree Charani 4/12 (3.5 overs) |

India won by 97 runs
Trent Bridge, Nottingham
Umpires: James Middlebrook (Eng) and Jacqueline Williams (WI)
Player of the match: Smriti Mandhana (Ind)

- England won the toss and elected to field.
- Shree Charani (Ind) made her T20I debut.
- Harleen Deol (Ind) scored her 1,000th run in international cricket.
- Lauren Bell (Eng) took her 100th wicket in international cricket.
- Smriti Mandhana and Shafali Verma (Ind) recorded the most fifty-plus partnerships (21) in women's T20Is and breaking the record of Australia's Alyssa Healy and Beth Mooney (20).
- Smriti Mandhana became the first Indian woman cricketer to score centuries in all three formats. She recorded the highest score by an Indian woman in T20Is, and recorded the most boundary runs in a T20I innings for India with 78, both surpassing Harmanpreet Kaur in 2018.

=== 2nd T20I ===
1 July 2025
18:30 (N)
Scorecard

| India; 181/4 (20 overs) | v | England; 157/7 (20 overs) |
| Amanjot Kaur 63* (40); Lauren Bell 2/17 (4 overs) | | Tammy Beaumont 54 (35); Shree Charani 2/28 (4 overs) |

India won by 24 runs
Bristol County Ground, Bristol
Umpires: Anna Harris (Eng) and James Middlebrook (Eng)
Player of the match: Amanjot Kaur (Ind)

- England won the toss and elected to field.
- Smriti Mandhana became the second Indian woman cricketer to play 150 T20I matches.
- Smriti Mandhana and Shafali Verma (Ind) recorded the most runs (2,724) as a pair in women's T20Is, going past the Australia's Beth Mooney and Alyssa Healy (2,720).
- Richa Ghosh (Ind) scored her 1,000th run in T20Is.
- Tammy Beaumont (Eng) scored her 7,000th run in international cricket.

=== 3rd T20I ===
4 July 2025
18:35 (N)
Scorecard

| England; 171/9 (20 overs) | v | India; 166/5 (20 overs) |
| Sophia Dunkley 75 (53); Deepti Sharma 3/27 (4 overs) | | Smriti Mandhana 56 (49); Lauren Filer 2/30 (4 overs) |

England won by 5 runs
The Oval, London
Umpires: Sue Redfern (Eng) and Jacqueline Williams (WI)
Player of the match: Sophia Dunkley (Eng)

- England won the toss and elected to bat.
- Tammy Beaumont (Eng) captained England for the first time in T20Is.
- Radha Yadav (Ind) took her 100th wicket in T20Is.
- Deepti Sharma (Ind) became the joint-second highest wicket taker (144) in women's T20Is.
- Smriti Mandhana (Ind) scored her 9,000th run in international cricket.

=== 4th T20I ===
9 July 2025
18:30 (N)
Scorecard

| England; 126/7 (20 overs) | v | India; 127/4 (17 overs) |
| Sophia Dunkley 22 (19); Radha Yadav 2/15 (4 overs) | | Smriti Mandhana 32 (31); Issy Wong 1/18 (3 overs) |

India won by 6 wickets
Old Trafford, Manchester
Umpires: Ian Blackwell (Eng) and Anna Harris (Eng)
Player of the match: Radha Yadav (Ind)

- England won the toss and elected to bat.
- Sophie Ecclestone (Eng) played in her 100th T20I match.
- Deepti Sharma (Ind) took her 300th wicket in international cricket. She took second highest wickets and took highest wickets among spinners surpassing Nida Dar in T20Is (145).
- Sophie Ecclestone (Eng) took her 300th wicket in international cricket.

=== 5th T20I ===
12 July 2025
18:35 (N)
Scorecard

| India; 167/7 (20 overs) | v | England; 168/5 (20 overs) |
| Shafali Verma 75 (41); Charlie Dean 3/23 (4 overs) | | Danni Wyatt-Hodge 56 (37); Deepti Sharma 2/31 (4 overs) |

England won by 5 wickets
Edgbaston, Birmingham
Umpires: Ian Blackwell (Eng) and Jacqueline Williams (WI)
Player of the match: Charlie Dean (Eng)

- England won the toss and elected to field.
- Kranti Goud (Ind) made her T20I debut.
- Danni Wyatt-Hodge became the second English woman cricketer to play 300 international matches.
- Richa Ghosh (Ind) scored her 2,000th run in international cricket.

== ODI series ==
=== 1st ODI ===
16 July 2025
13:00 (D/N)
Scorecard

| England; 258/6 (50 overs) | v | India; 262/6 (48.2 overs) |
| Sophia Dunkley 83 (92); Sneh Rana 2/31 (10 overs) | | Deepti Sharma 62* (64); Charlie Dean 2/52 (10 overs) |

India won by 4 wickets
Rose Bowl, Southampton
Umpires: Sue Redfern (Eng) and Jacqueline Williams (WI)
Player of the match: Deepti Sharma (Ind)

- England won the toss and elected to bat.
- Nat Sciver-Brunt (Eng) crossed 2,000 runs in England in ODIs.
- Smriti Mandhana and Pratika Rawal (Ind) scored 1,000th run as a pair in women's ODIs.
- This was India's second-highest successful run chase in women's ODIs.

=== 2nd ODI ===
19 July 2025
11:00
Scorecard

| India; 143/8 (29 overs) | v | England; 116/2 (21 overs) |
| Smriti Mandhana 42 (51); Sophie Ecclestone 3/27 (6 overs) | | Amy Jones 46* (57); Sneh Rana 1/12 (3 overs) |

England won by 8 wickets (DLS method)
Lord's, London
Umpires: Anna Harris (Eng) and Rob White (Eng)
Player of the match: Sophie Ecclestone (Eng)

- England won the toss and elected to field.
- The match was reduced to 29 overs per side due to rain.
- England were set a revised target of 115 runs from 24 overs due to rain.

=== 3rd ODI ===
22 July 2025
13:00 (D/N)
Scorecard

| India; 318/5 (50 overs) | v | England; 305 (49.5 overs) |
| Harmanpreet Kaur 102 (84); Sophie Ecclestone 1/28 (10 overs) | | Nat Sciver-Brunt 98 (105); Kranti Goud 6/52 (9.5 overs) |

India won by 13 runs
Riverside Ground, Chester-le-Street
Umpires: Rob White (Eng) and Jacqueline Williams (WI)
Player of the match: Harmanpreet Kaur (Ind)

- India won the toss and elected to bat.
- Jemimah Rodrigues (Ind) played in her 50th ODI match.
- Harmanpreet Kaur (Ind) scored her 4,000th run, and became the second Indian woman to cross 1,000 runs in England in ODIs.
- Jemimah Rodrigues (Ind) scored her 4,000th run in international cricket.
- Nat Sciver-Brunt (Eng) scored her 4,000th run in ODIs.
- Kranti Goud (Ind) took her maiden five-wicket haul in ODIs.
