= Tammy Beaumont =

England cricketer (born 1991)

Tammy Beaumont MBE
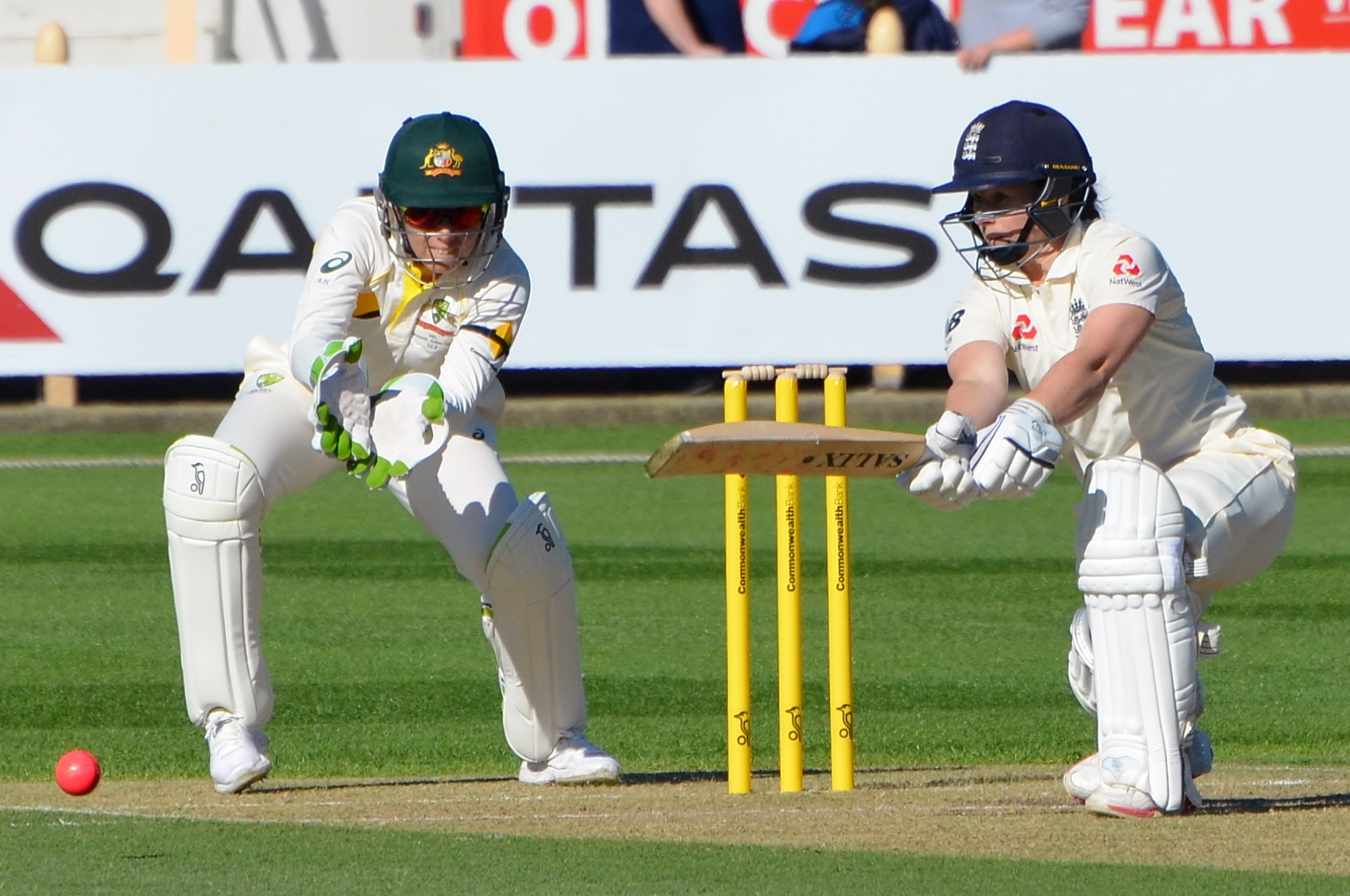
- Beaumont during the Women's Ashes Test, 2017

Personal information
- Full name: Tamsin Tilley Beaumont
- Born: 11 March 1991 (age 35); Dover, Kent, England
- Nickname: Tambo, Tamwarr, Tamzo, Tams, Titch
- Batting: Right-handed
- Role: Batter; occasional wicket-keeper

International information
- National side: England (2009–2026)
- Test debut (cap 150): 11 August 2013 v Australia
- Last Test: 10 July 2026 v India
- ODI debut (cap 109): 4 November 2009 v West Indies
- Last ODI: 29 October 2025 v South Africa
- ODI shirt no.: 12
- T20I debut (cap 23): 9 November 2009 v West Indies
- Last T20I: 12 July 2025 v India
- T20I shirt no.: 12

Domestic team information
- Years: Team
- 2007–2019: Kent
- 2016–2017: Surrey Stars
- 2016/17–2017/18: Adelaide Strikers
- 2018–2019: Southern Vipers
- 2019/20: Melbourne Renegades
- 2020–present: The Blaze
- 2020/21–2022/23: Sydney Thunder
- 2021: London Spirit
- 2022–2025: Welsh Fire (squad no. 12)
- 2023/24: Melbourne Renegades
- 2025/26: Adelaide Strikers
- 2026: Birmingham Phoenix

Career statistics
Competition	WTest	WODI	WT20I	WLA
Matches	11	140	109	230
Runs scored	612	4,738	1,975	7,440
Batting average	34.00	40.49	24.08	39.78
100s/50s	1/2	12/24	1/11	13/46
Top score	208	168*	116	168*
Catches/stumpings	14/–	37/4	14/4	95/33
Medal record
Women's cricket
Representing England
ICC Cricket World Cup
Winner	2017 England & Wales	Team
Runner-up	2022 New Zealand	Team
- Source: ESPNcricinfo, 4 June 2025

Tamsin Tilley Beaumont MBE (born 11 March 1991) is an English cricketer who currently plays as an opening batter and occasional wicket-keeper for the national team. She is second on list of most international centuries and third on ODI centuries. In domestic cricket, she plays for The Blaze. During The Hundred, she represents and captains the Welsh Fire. From 2025–26 season onwards, she will represent her former WBBL team Adelaide Strikers.

Beaumont was part of England's winning 2017 Women's Cricket World Cup team and was the leading run-scorer in the tournament. She was subsequently named player of the tournament and awarded MBE in recognition of her achievements. In 2019, she was named as a Wisden Cricketer of the Year. She became the 2nd woman in history to score a century in all three international formats and holds the record for the highest individual score by an English woman in Test cricket (208).

== Early life and education ==
Beaumont was born in Dover, Kent. She began playing cricket in nearby Sandwich, where she also attended Sir Roger Manwood's School. When she was eight years old, her mother, Julie, secured her very first selection in a cricket team. Beaumont's brother, Michael, was captain of an Under-11 team coached by her father, Kevin, a research scientist. As Beaumont later explained to Wisden Cricketers' Almanack in 2019:

"My mum tells the story quite proudly ... They were struggling for numbers. I sat on dad's armchair, looked at his notes and said: 'But I bowl better than him and I bat better than him! Why can't I play?' Dad looked at mum, who said: 'She's right.' So then they had to pick me."

Before long, Beaumont, her brother and her father were all taking the field for the Sandwich Town Second XI, for which her father played as an off spin bowler. According to Beaumont:

"Michael was a very good fielder, so he'd be at cow corner and I'd be keeping ... The number of times it was 'stumped or caught Beaumont, bowled Beaumont' was ridiculous."

As a child, Beaumont suffered from food allergies that slowed her growth. She was therefore not selected for Kent's Under-11 cricket team. On her mother's initiative, she took up gymnastics with the aim of building up her muscles, and eventually became a National Schools Gymnastics Champion. After leaving school, she studied chemistry and sports science at Loughborough University.

== Domestic career ==
In early 2007, Beaumont made her debut for Kent, batting at number five and scoring 13 not out. Her first match for the county as wicket-keeper came two months later as Kent hosted Nottinghamshire, and Beaumont claimed two stumpings and a run out. Later that summer, she was named in the England Development Squad team for the European Championship. She played in two matches, against Netherlands and Ireland, and made 7 & 8 respectively.

Beaumont continued to make regular appearances for Kent through the 2008 and 2009 seasons, and scored her maiden century in August 2009, hitting 136 off 144 balls to help set up a 184 run victory for Kent against the visiting Surrey team. The following month she was called up to the England squad to tour the West Indies, as Sarah Taylor withdrew from the squad to focus on her studies. She made her international debut in the first One Day International of the tour, at Basseterre, on 4 November 2009.

She is the holder of one of the first tranche of 18 ECB central contracts for women players, which were announced in April 2014. On 9 May 2014 she along with Kathryn Cross and Lauren Winfield joined Chance to Shine Programme as a coaching ambassador. In April 2015, she was named as one of the England women's Academy squad tour to Dubai, where England women played their Australian counterparts in two 50-over games, and two Twenty20 matches.

In February 2023, she signed for The Blaze ahead of the upcoming season. On 22 April 2023, in a match against Central Sparks, she scored a half-century and reached 7000 runs in Women's List A cricket.

== Franchise career ==
=== Women's Big Bash League ===
Beaumont has been a notable presence in the Women's Big Bash League, representing multiple franchises and contributing significantly as a top-order batter.

In November 2016, she signed with Adelaide Strikers during the WBBL|02 becoming one of the club's marquee overseas signings. She joined a team led by captain Tegan McPharlin and coach Andrea McCauley. She played 12 matches and scored 276 runs at an average of 25.09 and a strike rate of 96.50 scoring 3 half-centuries in the season. Despite her efforts, the Strikers performed terrible in the season, finishing at the bottom of the table winning only three of their fourteen matches.

Beaumont returned to the Adelaide Strikers for the WBBL|03, continuing her role as a top-order batter. Throughout the season, Beaumont played 15 matches, scoring a total of 301 runs at an average of 20.06 and a strike rate of 90.39. Her highest score for the season was 50 runs, achieved during the semi-final match against the Sydney Sixers on February 2, 2018. In that match, Beaumont's half-century was pivotal in the Strikers' chase of 139 runs; however, despite her efforts, the team fell short, finishing at 121/9 and losing by 17 runs. Beaumont's contributions led Strikers finishing 4th on the table qualifying for the semi-finals with winning eight of their fourteen matches.

In September 2019, Beaumont signed with the Melbourne Renegades for the WBBL|05, stepping in as a replacement for Amy Satterthwaite, who was on maternity leave. Throughout the season, Beaumont played 13 matches, scoring a total of 277 runs at an average of 23.08 and a strike rate of 99.64 with the best score of 41. Beaumont was unavailable for the Renegades' semi-final match due to national team commitments and was replaced by Sri Lankan batter Chamari Athapaththu for the finals. The Renegades concluded the season in fourth place, qualifying for the semi-finals winning eight of their fourteen matches, but eventually got eliminated losing to Brisbane Heat in the semi-finals.

In October 2020, Beaumont joined the Sydney Thunder for the WBBL|06 alongside her fellow English teammate Heather Knight, both bringing the international experience to the team's top order. Throughout the tournament, she played a pivotal role in the Thunder's successful campaign, which culminated in their second WBBL title and she winning her first WBBL title. Beaumont featured in 16 matches during the season, scoring a total of 209 runs at an average of 13.93 and a strike rate of 90.47 with the best score of 30.

=== The Hundred ===
Tammy Beaumont has been an integral part of The Hundred since the tournament's inception in 2021. She began her journey with the London Spirit in the inaugural season, where she scored 139 runs in 6 matches at an average of 23.17. Despite her steady contributions at the top of the order, the Spirit finished fourth in the standings and failed to qualify for the Eliminator.

In 2022, Beaumont signed for Welsh Fire at £31,250 and was named team captain, taking on leadership role for the 2022 season. The Fire endured a difficult season, finishing at the bottom of the table with just one win in six matches. Beaumont, however, provided glimpses of form, scoring 138 runs across the tournament, including a few crucial innings that underlined her class and resilience.

In 2023, Beaumont was retained by Welsh Fire downgrading her contract to £25,000 for the 2023 season. On 14 August 2023, she delivered one of the most memorable performances in the history of The Hundred by becoming the first woman to score a century in the competition scoring a blistering knock of 118 off just 61 balls against the Trent Rockets was laced with 20 boundaries and two sixes, earning widespread acclaim. Beaumont finished the season as the 2nd highest run-scorer of the season with 290 runs in 8 matches at an average of 41.43 and a strike rate of 153.44. Under her captaincy, Welsh Fire showed significant improvement, finishing third in the league stage and qualifying for the Eliminator. They were eventually defeated by the Northern Superchargers ending their campaign.

In 2024, Fire maintained their trust Beaumont retaining her for £40,000. She continued to lead the Fire in 2024 season contributing consistently with the bat and providing strategic stability to the squad. She scored 164 runs in 8 matches at an average of 23.42. Under her captaincy team performed brilliantly finishing on top of the table winning 5 of their 8 matches qualifying directly to the finals. They eventually lost a close final against London Spirit finishing their campaign as runner-up in that season.

== International career ==
=== Debut and early beginning (2009–2013) ===
Beaumont made her international debut for England Women at the age of 18, playing in a One Day International (ODI) against the West Indies on 4 November 2009 at Warner Park, Basseterre in St Kitts. Initially selected as a wicketkeeper-batter, her early appearances were occasional, and she found herself struggling to make a mark in a team that included legends like Charlotte Edwards, Sarah Taylor, and Claire Taylor.

Between 2009 and 2013, Beaumont was often in and out of the national setup. She lacked consistent game time, was frequently slotted into unfamiliar positions in the batting order, and suffered from inconsistent form. During this period, she made her T20I debut on 9 November 2009, also against the West Indies, but was unable to produce a breakout performance in either format.

Despite being a standout performer in county cricket for Kent, her international career seemed to stall. She also featured in the squad of 2013 Women's Cricket World Cup but had a negligible role.

=== Fighting for a place and role redefinition (2014–2015) ===
By 2014, Beaumont had faded from the regular England XI, but she continued to perform well in domestic cricket, showcasing a more refined technique and improved shot selection. A key development during this time was her decision to focus less on wicketkeeping and more on developing as a specialist batter.

This transition eventually bore fruit. With England beginning to look for new top-order options following the departure of some senior players and underperformance of others, Beaumont worked on redefining her role—shifting focus towards opening the batting and playing more aggressively.

=== Breakthrough series (2016) ===
Beaumont's breakthrough moment arrived during England's ODI series against Pakistan in June 2016. Promoted to open the batting under new captain Heather Knight, she seized the opportunity in the very first match by scoring 70 off 75 balls, her maiden ODI half-century. In the next match, she scored her maiden ODI century scoring 104 off 116 balls. She finished the series with 342 runs at an average of 114, including two centuries and a fifty, and was named Player of the Series. This performance firmly established her as England's preferred opener and marked the beginning of her golden run.

=== 2017 Women's Cricket World Cup ===
At the 2017 Women's Cricket World Cup, Beaumont and Sarah Taylor scored the highest partnership for any wicket in Women's Cricket World Cup history, scoring 275 against South Africa. During the same World Cup, she along with Nat Sciver set what was at the time the record 4th wicket partnership (170) in Women's World Cup history. Beaumont went on to win the 2017 World Cup with England, and was voted player of the tournament, as the leading run-scorer, with 410 runs. Her contribution to England's success was recognised when she was appointed a Member of the Order of the British Empire (MBE) in the 2018 New Year Honours list.

=== Later career ===
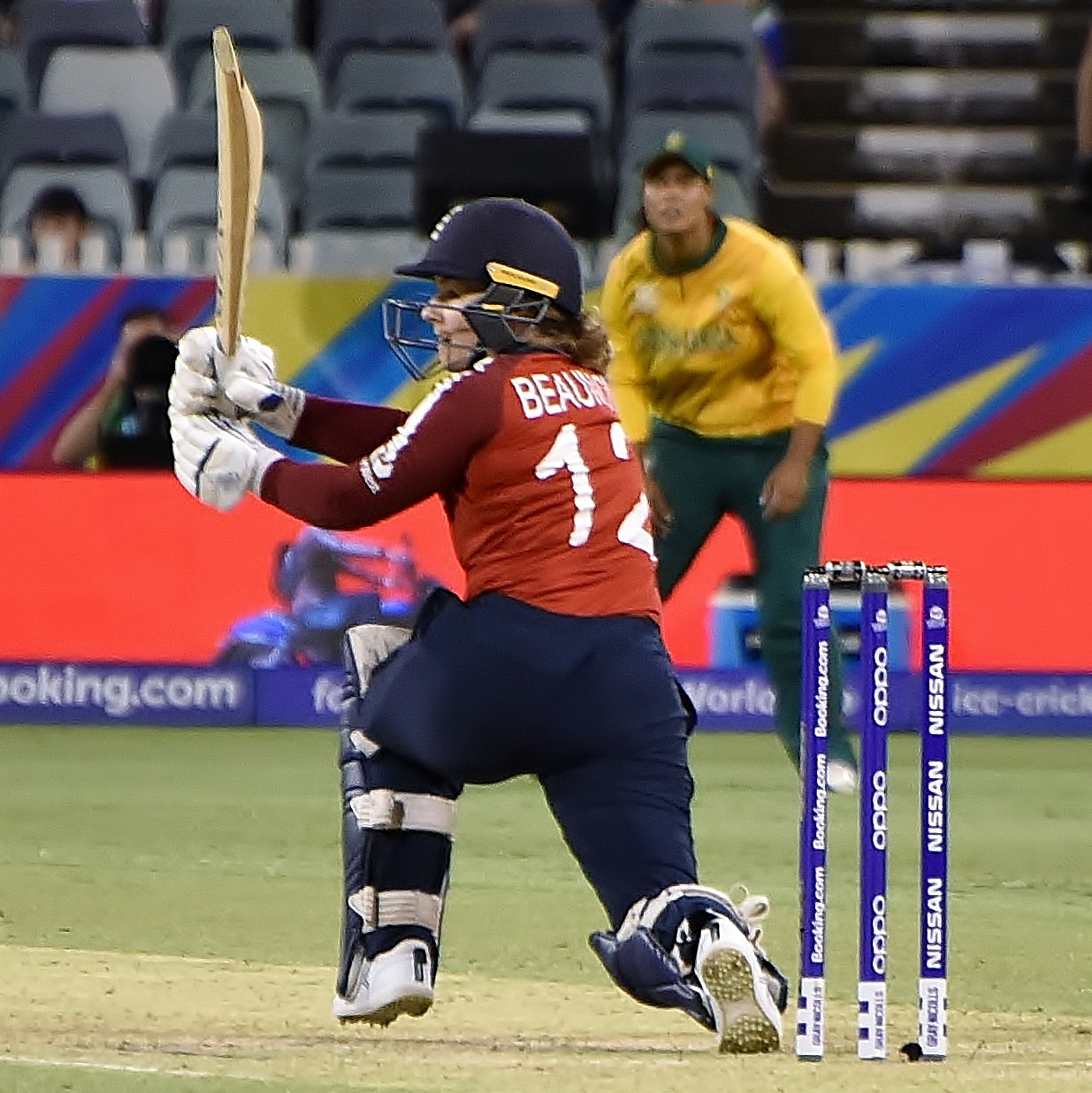
Beaumont batting for England during the 2020 ICC Women's T20 World Cup

In December 2017, she was named as one of the players in the ICC Women's ODI Team of the Year.

On 20 June 2018, she scored her first century in WT20Is, making 116 against South Africa in the second match of the 2018 England women's Tri-Nation Series. In the same match, England scored 250 runs, a new record for the highest innings total in WT20Is.

In October 2018, she was named in England's squad for the 2018 ICC Women's World Twenty20 tournament in the West Indies. Ahead of the tournament, she was named as one of the players to watch. In February 2019, she was awarded a full central contract by the England and Wales Cricket Board (ECB) for 2019.

In March 2019, during the first Women's Twenty20 International (WT20I) match against Sri Lanka, Beaumont scored her 1,000th run in WT20I cricket. In April 2019, she was named as a Wisden Cricketer of the Year.

In June 2019, the ECB named her in England's squad for their opening match against Australia to contest the Women's Ashes. In the second WODI of the series, Beaumont scored the first century in a WODI by an England cricketer in the Women's Ashes. In January 2020, she was named in England's squad for the 2020 ICC Women's T20 World Cup in Australia.

On 18 June 2020, Beaumont was named in a squad of 24 players to begin training ahead of international women's fixtures starting in England following the COVID-19 pandemic.

On 2 March 2021, Beaumont overtook Meg Lanning to top the MRF Tyres ICC Player Rankings for batters, and on 9 March she was subsequently named as the ICC's Female Player of the Month for February 2021.

In June 2021, Beaumont was named as in England's Test squad for their one-off match against India. In December 2021, Beaumont was named in England's squad for their tour to Australia to contest the Women's Ashes. In January 2022, she was named as the ICC women's T20I Cricketer of the Year for 2021. In February 2022, she was named in England's team for the 2022 Women's Cricket World Cup in New Zealand.

On 23 June 2023, she scored her first Test century in the only Test of the 2023 Women's Ashes series. She broke several records, including becoming just the second woman in history (after Heather Knight) to score a century in all three international formats. The following day, in the same innings, she finished with a score of 208, setting the highest ever score by an English female cricketer in Test history and becoming the first to score a double century. This eclipsed Betty Snowball's 189, a record that had stood since 1935. Her score of 208 became the fifth highest score in Women's Tests.

On 9 September 2024, Beaumont became the leading century maker for England in Women's One Day International cricket when she compiled her 10th ton in a match against Ireland at Stormont in Belfast, scoring 150 not out off 139 balls in a record 275-run win. During her innings, Beaumont passed 4,000 WODI runs, becoming the fastest English player to do so, having reached the milestone in 110 innings.

Beaumont was named in England's squad for their multi-format tour to South Africa in November 2024.

She was named in the England squad for the 2025 Women's Ashes series in Australia.

Beaumont scored 107 in the 1st ODI of a three match ODI series against the West Indies at the County Cricket Ground, Derby, on 30 May 2025. She scored 106 in the 2nd ODI of the series at Grace Road, Leicester, as she along with Amy Jones became the first opening pair – women's or men's – to score back-to-back hundreds in ODI history.

On 4 July 2025, Beaumont was named captain of the England cricket team for the 3rd T20I against India, marking the first time she led the national team in her international career. She stepped in for regular skipper Nat Sciver-Brunt, who was ruled out of the match due to a groin injury. The following day, it was confirmed by England Cricket Board that Sciver-Brunt would miss the remainder of the T20I series against India due to injury. As a result, it was announced that Beaumont would continue to lead the England for the remainder of the T20I series.

She was left out of the England squad for the 2026 Women's T20 World Cup. However, she was named in the line-up for the Test match between England and India at Lord's from 10 to 13 July 2026. Two days before the match began, Beaumont announced she would retire from all forms of international cricket following its conclusion. She scored two runs in her team's first innings and was out for a golden duck in their second.

== Captaincy ==
=== International ===
Beaumont's first stint as a captain came on India tour of England in 2025. On 4 July 2025, she was appointed captain of the England women's team for the third T20I against India, marking the first time in her 247-match international career that she led the national team. Regular captain Nat Sciver-Brunt had suffered a groin injury, forcing her to withdraw from the remainder of the T20I series, as a result Beaumont retained the captaincy for the remaining matches. She led the team for the remaining 3 T20Is of the series winning two of those but eventually losing the series.

Tammy Beaumont captaincy record
Format	Matches	Won	Lost	Tied	NR	Win%
T20I	3	2	1	–	–	66.66%
Total	3	2	1	–	–	66.66%

== Career summary ==
As of November 2025, Beaumont has recorded over 7000 runs with 14 international centuries – 1 in Test cricket, 12 in One Day Internationals, and 1 in Twenty20 International.

Her only Test century was as a double century, scoring 208 against Australia in the 2023 Women's Ashes series at Trent Bridge. During the innings she broke Betty Snowball's record of 189 to register the highest individual score by an English woman in Test cricket; the record had stood since 1935.

Centuries by opponents
Opponent	WTest	WODI	WT20I	Total
Australia	1	1	–	2
Ireland	–	1	–	1
New Zealand	–	1	–	1
South Africa	–	4	1	5
Pakistan	–	3	–	3
West Indies	–	2	–	2
Total	1	12	1	14

Centuries in WTests
No.	Runs	Opponent	Pos.	Inn.	Test	Venue	H/A	Date	Result	Ref
1	208	Australia	2	2	1/1	Trent Bridge	Home	22 June 2023	Lost	

Centuries in WODIs
No.	Runs	Against	Pos.	Inn.	S/R	Venue	H/A/N	Date	Result	Ref
1	104†	Pakistan	2	1	89.65	New Road, Worcester	Home	22 June 2016	Won	
2	168*†	Pakistan	2	1	116.66	County Ground, Taunton	Home	27 June 2016	Won	
3	148	South Africa	2	1	102.06	Bristol County Ground	Home	5 July 2017	Won	
4	101	South Africa	2	1	92.66	County Cricket Ground, Hove	Home	12 June 2018	Won	
5	105†	South Africa	2	2	85.36	St Lawrence Ground	Home	15 June 2018	Won	
6	114	Australia	2	1	99.13	Grace Road	Home	4 July 2019	Lost	
7	107	Pakistan	1	1	75.88	Kinrara Academy Oval	Neutral	9 December 2019	Won	
8	102†	New Zealand	2	1	89.47	St Lawrence Ground	Home	26 September 2021	Won	
9	119†	South Africa	2	1	111.21	Grace Road	Home	18 July 2022	Won	
10	150*†	Ireland	1	1	107.91	Stormont Cricket Ground	Away	9 September 2024	Won	
11	107	West Indies	1	1	102.88	County Cricket Ground, Derby	Home	30 May 2025	Won	
12	106	West Indies	1	1	97.24	Grace Road	Home	4 June 2025	Won	

Centuries in WT20Is
No.	Runs	Against	Pos.	Inn.	S/R	Venue	H/A	Date	Result	Ref
1	116†	South Africa	2	1	223.07	County Ground, Taunton	Home	20 June 2018	Won	

Key

Symbol	Key
*	Not out
†	Player of the match
‡	Captained the England team

== Personal life ==
Beaumont has a long-term partner, named Callum.

According to the ECB, Beaumont's nickname is "Tambo", but Kent Cricket lists her nicknames as "Tamwarr", "Tamzo", "Tams" and "Titch".

== Honours ==
Sydney Thunder

- Women's Big Bash League: 2020–21

Welsh Fire

- The Hundred runner-up: 2024

The Blaze

- Women's T20 Blast: 2026

England

- ICC Cricket World Cup: 2017; runner-up: 2022

Individual

- PCA Women's Player of the Year: 2016, 2023
- One of the five Wisden Cricketers of the Year: 2019
- ICC Women's ODI Team of the Year: 2017, 2018, 2019, 2021
- ICC Women's T20I Team of the Year: 2021
- ICC Women's T20I Cricketer of the Year: 2021
- ICC Cricket World Cup – Player of the tournament: 2017
- ICC Women's Player of the Month: February 2021, September 2024
- ECB Special Merit Award

Orders

- Member of Order of the British Empire by Queen Elizabeth II: 2018
