= 2013 Women's Cricket World Cup squads =

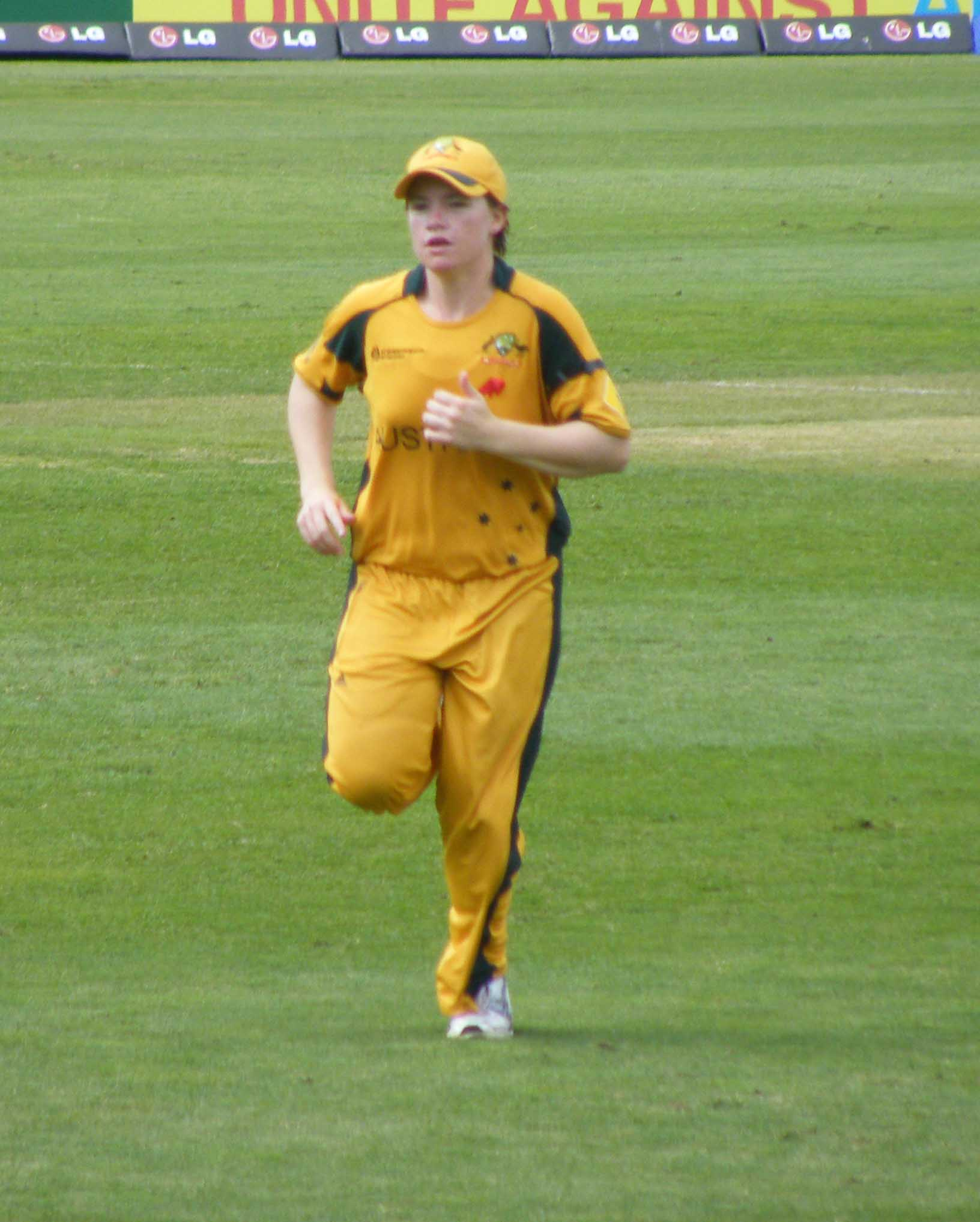
Australia's Jess Cameron was player of the match in the World Cup final.

The 2013 Women's Cricket World Cup squads consisted of 120 players from 8 national women's cricket teams. Organised by the International Cricket Council (ICC), the 2013 Women's Cricket World Cup, held in India, was the tenth edition of the competition. Australia won the tournament for the sixth time, defeating the West Indies by 114 runs in the final.

Each team selected a squad of 15 players which was finalised by 24 January 2013, and any changes to that squad due to illness or injury had to be requested in writing, and approved by the ICC's Event Technical Committee. Once a player had been removed from the squad through this process, they could only return as an approved replacement for a different player suffering illness or injury.

England's captain, Charlotte Edwards, appeared in the tournament for the fifth successive time, the most of any player at the 2013 competition, while India's captain, Mithali Raj, made her fourth successive appearance. Entering the tournament, Raj was ranked top of the ICC's batting rankings, while Katherine Brunt of England was rated the best bowler. West Indian Stafanie Taylor, second in the batting rankings, was the top ranked all-rounder. All three players maintained their positions at the top of the rankings at the conclusion of the tournament.

At the conclusion of the tournament, an ICC panel selected their team of the tournament. The player of the tournament, New Zealand's Suzie Bates, was selected as the team's captain, joined by four English players—Edwards, Brunt, Holly Colvin and Anya Shrubsole—three Australian players—Rachael Haynes, Jodie Fields and Megan Schutt—two West Indians—Taylor and Deandra Dottin—and Eshani Kaushalya of Sri Lanka. Holly Ferling of Australia was selected as the twelfth player.

== Key ==
Table headings
Bowling styles
Player notes
- Bat – Handedness when batting
- Bowl – Bowling style
- GP – Games played
- R – Runs scored
- A – Batting average
- W – Wickets taken
- E – Economy rate
- C – Catches
- S – Stumpings
- LM – Left-arm medium
- LF – Left-arm fast
- LFM – Left-arm fast-medium
- LMF – Left-arm medium-fast
- L? – Left-arm unknown style
- LB – Leg break
- LBG – Leg break googly
- RM – Right-arm medium
- RF – Right-arm fast
- RFM – Right-arm fast-medium
- RMF – Right-arm medium-fast
- SLA – Slow left-arm orthodox
- OB – Off break
- (c) – Captain
- (vc) – Vice-captain
- † – Wicket-keeper
- ^{W} – Withdrawn player

== Australia ==
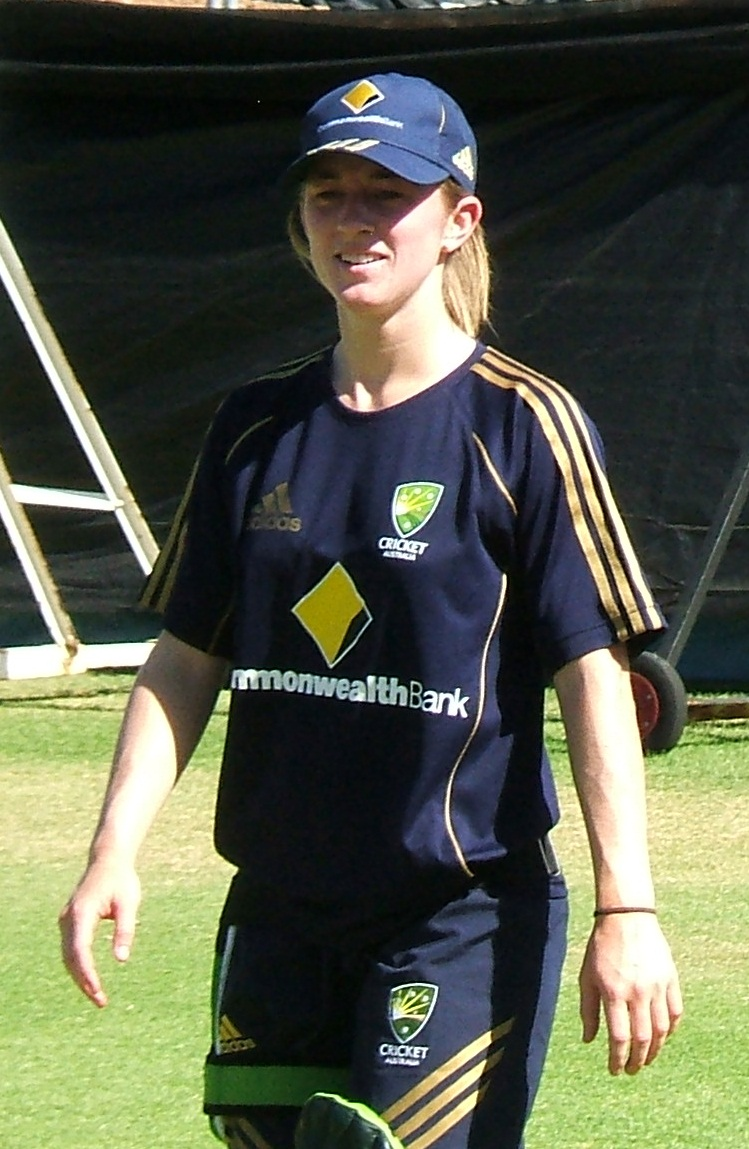
Rachael Haynes was Australia's leading run-scorer during the competition, accruing 273 runs.

Australian squad for the 2013 Women's Cricket World Cup
Player	Date of birth	Bat	Bowl	GP	R	A	W	E	C	S
Alex Blackwell (vc)	31 August 1983 (aged 29)	Right	RM	7	84	16.80	–	–	4	0
Jess Cameron	27 June 1989 (aged 23)	Right	LBG	7	225	37.50	–	–	4	0
Renee Chappell	7 July 1983 (aged 29)	Right	OB	2	8	4.00	0	4.50	0	0
Sarah Coyte	30 March 1991 (aged 21)	Right	RM	6	90	30.00	6	3.69	0	0
Holly Ferling	22 December 1995 (aged 17)	Right	RFM	4	4	2.00	9	3.65	0	0
Jodie Fields (c) †	19 June 1984 (aged 28)	Right	RM	7	79	19.75	–	–	9	1
Rachael Haynes	26 December 1986 (aged 26)	Left	LM	7	273	45.50	1	3.00	4	0
Alyssa Healy †	24 March 1990 (aged 22)	Right	–	0	–	–	–	–	–	–
Julie Hunter	15 March 1984 (aged 28)	Left	LM	6	16	16.00	6	2.57	0	0
Meg Lanning	25 March 1992 (aged 20)	Right	RM	7	226	32.28	–	–	3	0
Erin Osborne	27 June 1989 (aged 23)	Right	OB	6	46	15.33	9	2.83	1	0
Ellyse Perry	3 November 1990 (aged 22)	Right	RFM	4	39	39.00	8	3.45	2	0
Megan Schutt	15 January 1993 (aged 20)	Right	RFM	7	3	1.00	15	4.13	6	0
Lisa Sthalekar	13 August 1979 (aged 33)	Right	OB	7	128	25.60	9	2.71	6	0
Elyse Villani	6 October 1989 (aged 23)	Right	RFM	0	–	–	–	–	–	–
Jess Jonassen^{W}	5 November 1992 (aged 20)	Left	SLA	Replaced by Renee Chappell						

== England ==
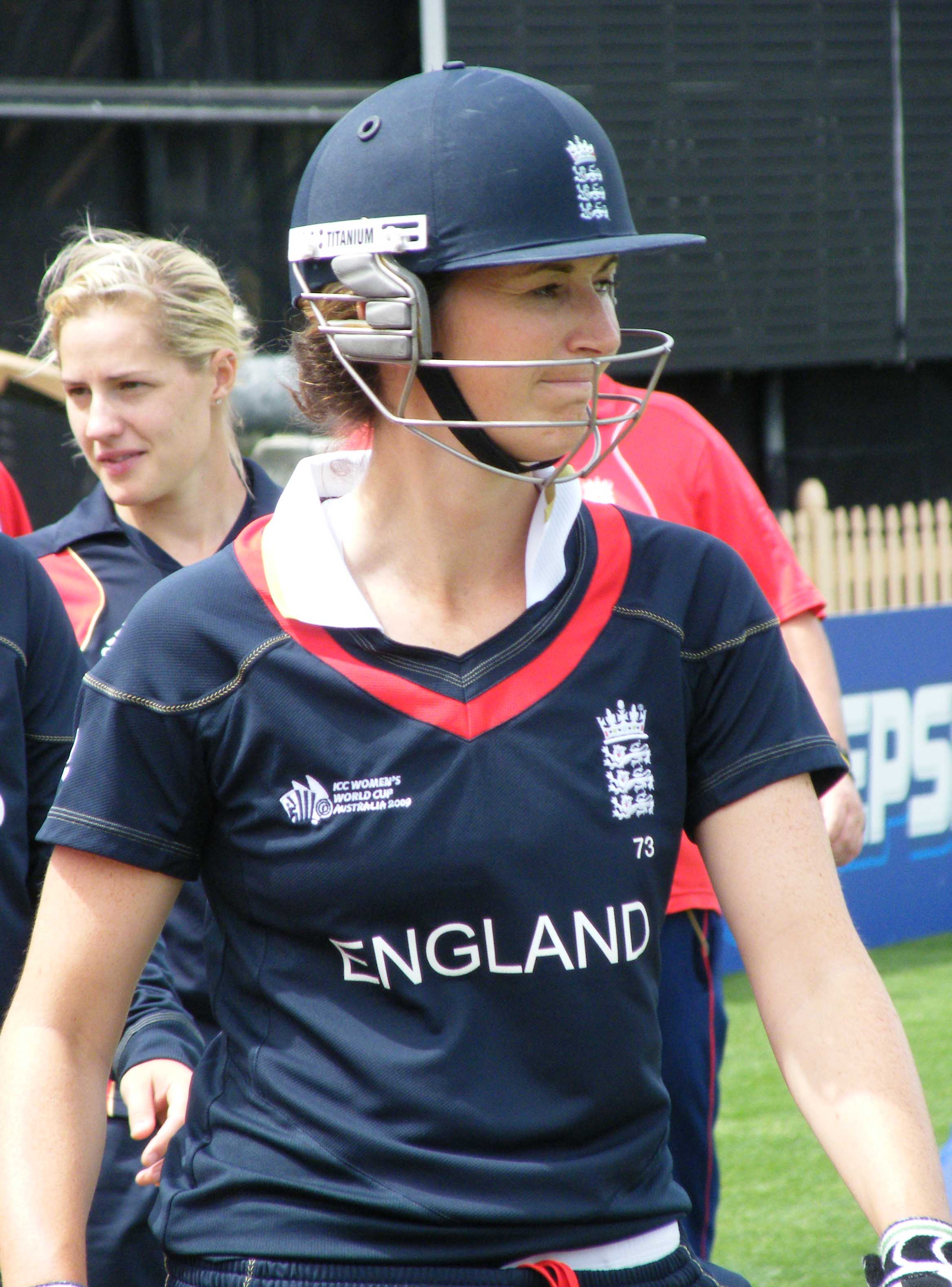
Charlotte Edwards was England's leading run-scorer during the competition, accruing 292 runs.

English squad for the 2013 Women's Cricket World Cup
Player	Date of birth	Bat	Bowl	GP	R	A	W	E	C	S
Tammy Beaumont †	11 March 1991 (aged 21)	Right	–	0	–	–	–	–	–	–
Arran Brindle	23 November 1981 (aged 31)	Right	RM	7	139	27.80	11	4.40	0	0
Katherine Brunt	2 July 1985 (aged 27)	Right	RMF	7	35	11.66	12	3.80	1	0
Holly Colvin	7 September 1989 (aged 23)	Right	SLA	7	26	26.00	9	3.39	2	0
Charlotte Edwards (c)	17 December 1979 (aged 33)	Right	LB	7	292	58.40	–	–	3	0
Georgia Elwiss	31 May 1991 (aged 21)	Right	RMF	1	–	–	2	5.57	1	0
Lydia Greenway	6 August 1985 (aged 27)	Left	OB	7	160	26.66	–	–	6	0
Jenny Gunn	9 May 1986 (aged 26)	Right	RMF	7	83	20.75	5	3.57	2	0
Danielle Hazell	13 May 1988 (aged 24)	Right	OB	2	19	–	2	4.52	1	0
Amy Jones †	13 June 1993 (aged 19)	Right	–	1	41	41.00	–	–	1	0
Heather Knight	26 December 1990 (aged 22)	Right	RM	7	86	21.50	–	–	4	0
Laura Marsh	5 December 1986 (aged 26)	Right	RFM / OB	6	59	19.66	1	4.91	3	0
Anya Shrubsole	7 December 1991 (aged 21)	Right	RM	5	13	–	13	2.71	5	0
Sarah Taylor †	20 May 1989 (aged 23)	Right	–	6	151	25.16	–	–	6	3
Danielle Wyatt	22 April 1991 (aged 21)	Right	OB	7	118	16.85	7	6.46	1	0

== India ==
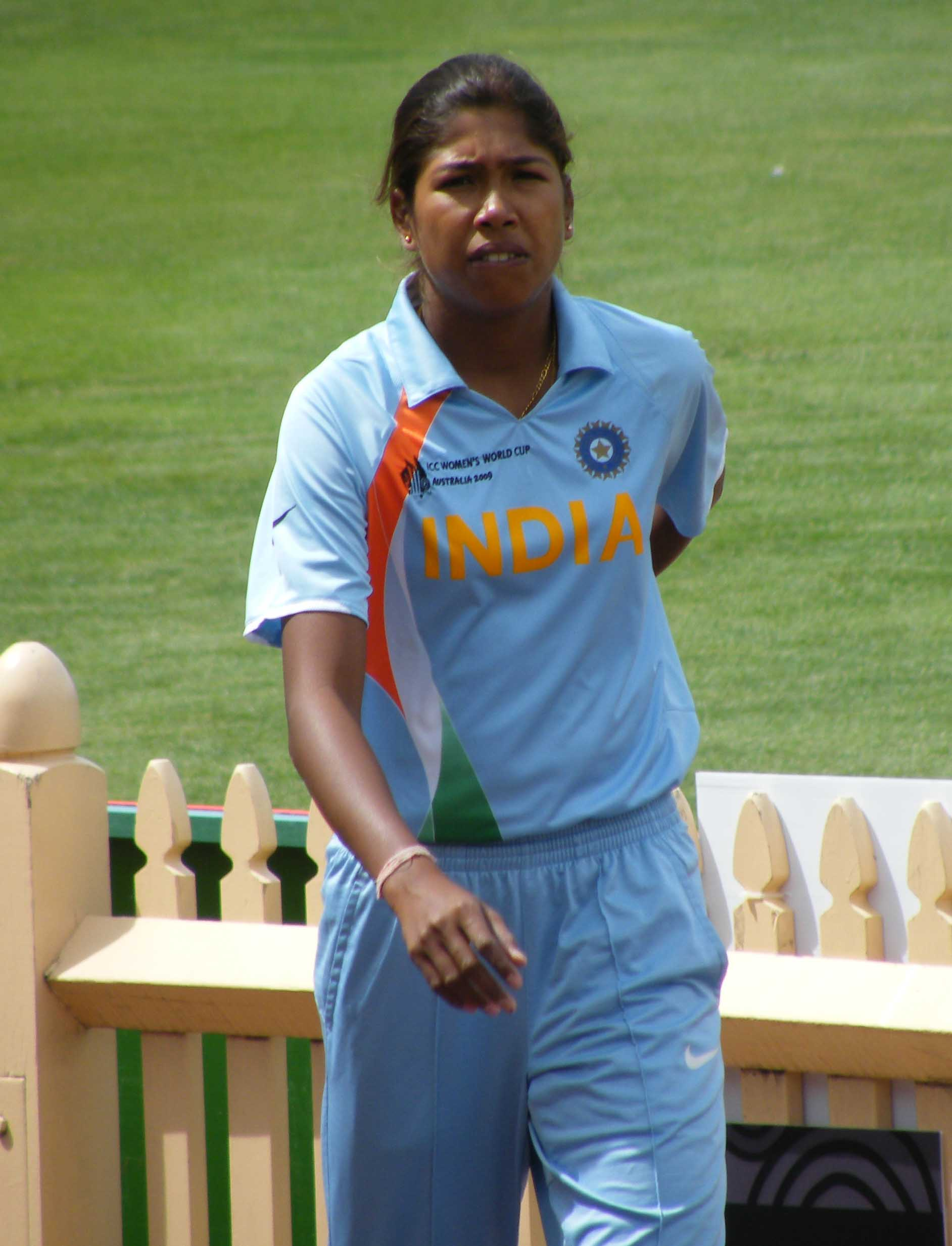
Jhulan Goswami was India's leading wicket-taker during the competition, with 9 wickets.

Indian squad for the 2013 Women's Cricket World Cup
Player	Date of birth	Bat	Bowl	GP	R	A	W	E	C	S
Ekta Bisht	8 February 1986 (aged 26)	Left	SLA	3	8	4.00	1	4.68	0	0
Jhulan Goswami	25 November 1983 (aged 29)	Right	RM	4	77	25.66	9	3.62	2	0
Karu Jain †	9 September 1985 (aged 27)	Right	–	3	64	32.00	–	–	2	1
Thirush Kamini	30 July 1990 (aged 22)	Left	LB	4	158	39.50	–	–	1	0
Harmanpreet Kaur	8 March 1989 (aged 23)	Right	RMF	4	159	53.00	–	–	0	0
Reema Malhotra	17 October 1980 (aged 32)	Right	LB	4	83	27.66	1	6.09	2	0
Mona Meshram	30 September 1991 (aged 21)	Right	RM	0	–	–	–	–	–	–
Sulakshana Naik †	10 November 1978 (aged 34)	Right	–	1	3	3.00	–	–	2	0
Nagarajan Niranjana	9 October 1988 (aged 24)	Right	RM	3	2	1.00	8	4.93	1	0
Rasanara Parwin	4 May 1992 (aged 20)	Right	OB	1	–	–	0	4.85	0	0
Mithali Raj (c)	3 December 1982 (aged 30)	Right	LB	4	132	66.00	–	–	3	0
Poonam Raut	14 October 1989 (aged 23)	Right	OB	4	85	21.25	–	–	1	0
Amita Sharma	12 September 1982 (aged 30)	Right	RMF	4	9	4.50	2	4.06	2	0
Shubhlakshmi Sharma	31 December 1989 (aged 23)	Right	RM	1	4	4.00	0	5.77	0	0
Gouher Sultana	31 March 1988 (aged 24)	Right	SLA	4	14	–	3	5.55	2	0

== New Zealand ==
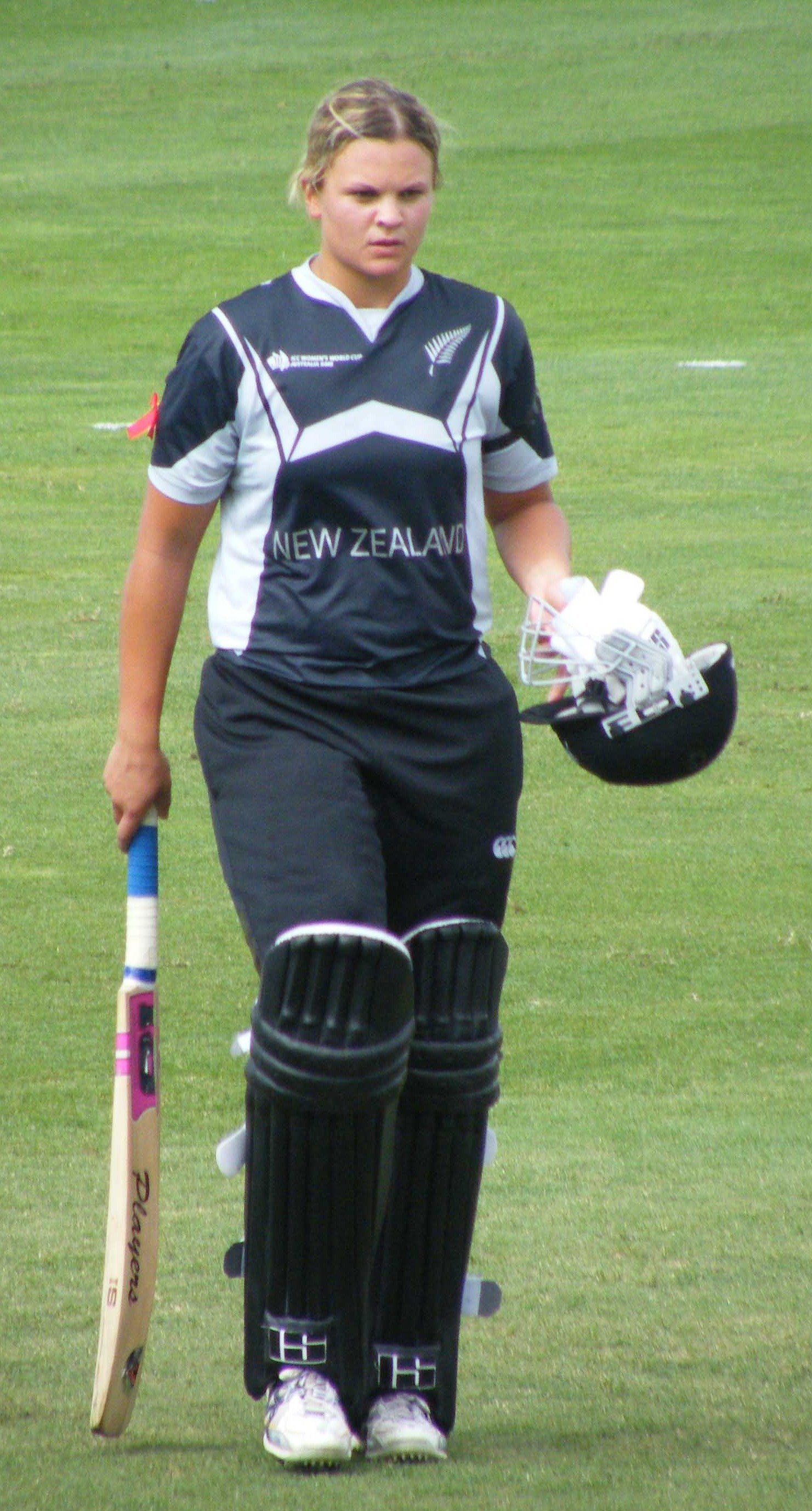
Suzie Bates was the competition's leading run-scorer, hitting 407 runs for New Zealand

New Zealand squad for the 2013 Women's Cricket World Cup
Player	Date of birth	Bat	Bowl	GP	R	A	W	E	C	S
Suzie Bates (c)	16 September 1987 (aged 25)	Right	RM	7	407	67.83	4	5.66	4	0
Kate Broadmore	11 November 1991 (aged 21)	Right	RM	2	8	8.00	1	3.45	0	0
Nicola Browne	14 September 1983 (aged 29)	Right	RM	7	111	55.50	3	4.72	3	0
Rachel Candy	23 July 1986 (aged 26)	Right	RMF	3	1	–	6	3.90	0	0
Sophie Devine	1 September 1989 (aged 23)	Right	RM	6	217	43.40	–	–	0	0
Natalie Dodd	22 November 1992 (aged 20)	Right	OB	0	–	–	–	–	–	–
Lucy Doolan	11 December 1987 (aged 25)	Right	OB	5	31	6.20	6	5.10	1	0
Sara McGlashan †	28 March 1982 (aged 30)	Right	–	7	67	11.16	–	–	3	0
Frances Mackay	1 June 1990 (aged 22)	Right	OB	5	73	36.50	3	4.55	3	0
Morna Nielsen	24 February 1990 (aged 22)	Right	OB	4	16	8.00	8	3.85	0	0
Katie Perkins	7 July 1988 (aged 24)	Right	RM	6	105	26.25	–	–	5	0
Rachel Priest †	13 June 1985 (aged 27)	Right	–	7	66	22.00	–	–	9	3
Sian Ruck	8 December 1983 (aged 29)	Right	LM	6	6	–	12	3.16	1	0
Amy Satterthwaite	7 October 1986 (aged 26)	Left	RM	6	199	33.16	0	9.00	2	0
Lea Tahuhu	23 September 1990 (aged 22)	Right	RM	6	7	7.00	7	3.38	2	0

== Pakistan ==
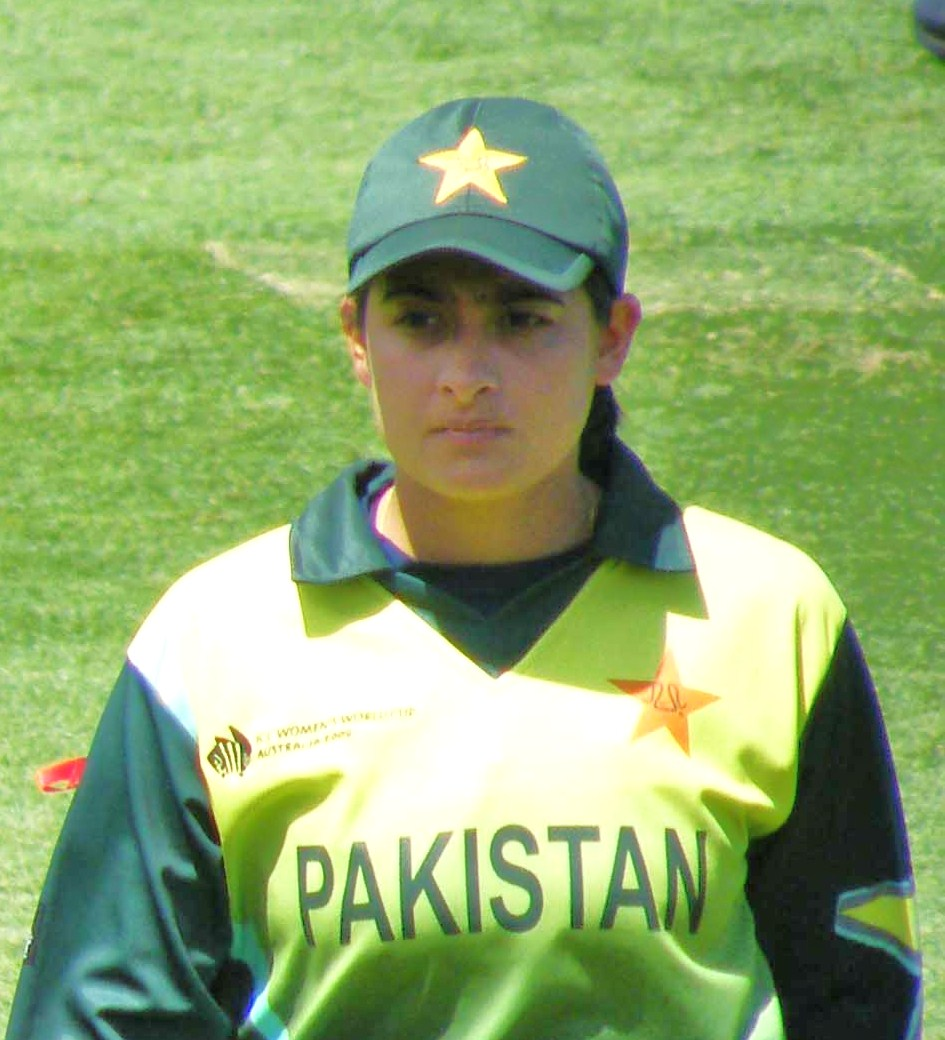
Sana Mir captained Pakistan during the tournament

Pakistani squad for the 2013 Women's Cricket World Cup
Player	Date of birth	Bat	Bowl	GP	R	A	W	E	C	S
Asmavia Iqbal	1 January 1988 (aged 25)	Right	RMF	4	35	8.75	4	5.11	0	0
Batool Fatima †	14 August 1982 (aged 30)	Right	RMF	2	17	8.50	–	–	3	0
Bismah Maroof (vc)	18 July 1991 (aged 21)	Left	LB	4	82	20.50	1	4.72	0	0
Diana Baig	15 October 1995 (aged 17)	Right	RM	0	–	–	–	–	–	–
Elizebath Khan	6 April 1989 (aged 23)	Right	RFM	0	–	–	–	–	–	–
Javeria Khan	14 May 1988 (aged 24)	Right	OB	3	14	4.66	–	–	0	0
Nahida Khan	3 November 1986 (aged 26)	Right	RM	2	12	6.00	–	–	0	0
Nain Abidi	23 May 1985 (aged 27)	Right	–	4	71	17.75	–	–	0	0
Nida Dar	2 January 1987 (aged 26)	Right	OB	3	82	41.00	1	5.37	0	0
Qanita Jalil	21 March 1980 (aged 32)	Right	RMF	4	44	11.00	3	3.26	0	0
Rabiya Shah	27 April 1992 (aged 20)	Left	OB	1	1	1.00	–	–	0	0
Sadia Yousuf	4 November 1989 (aged 23)	Right	SLA	4	10	10.00	3	3.22	0	0
Sana Mir (c)	5 January 1986 (aged 27)	Right	LB	4	14	3.50	2	3.75	1	0
Sidra Ameen	7 April 1992 (aged 20)	Right	RMF	4	32	8.00	–	–	0	0
Sumaiya Siddiqi	30 November 1988 (aged 24)	Right	RM	3	3	1.50	2	3.47	0	0

== South Africa ==
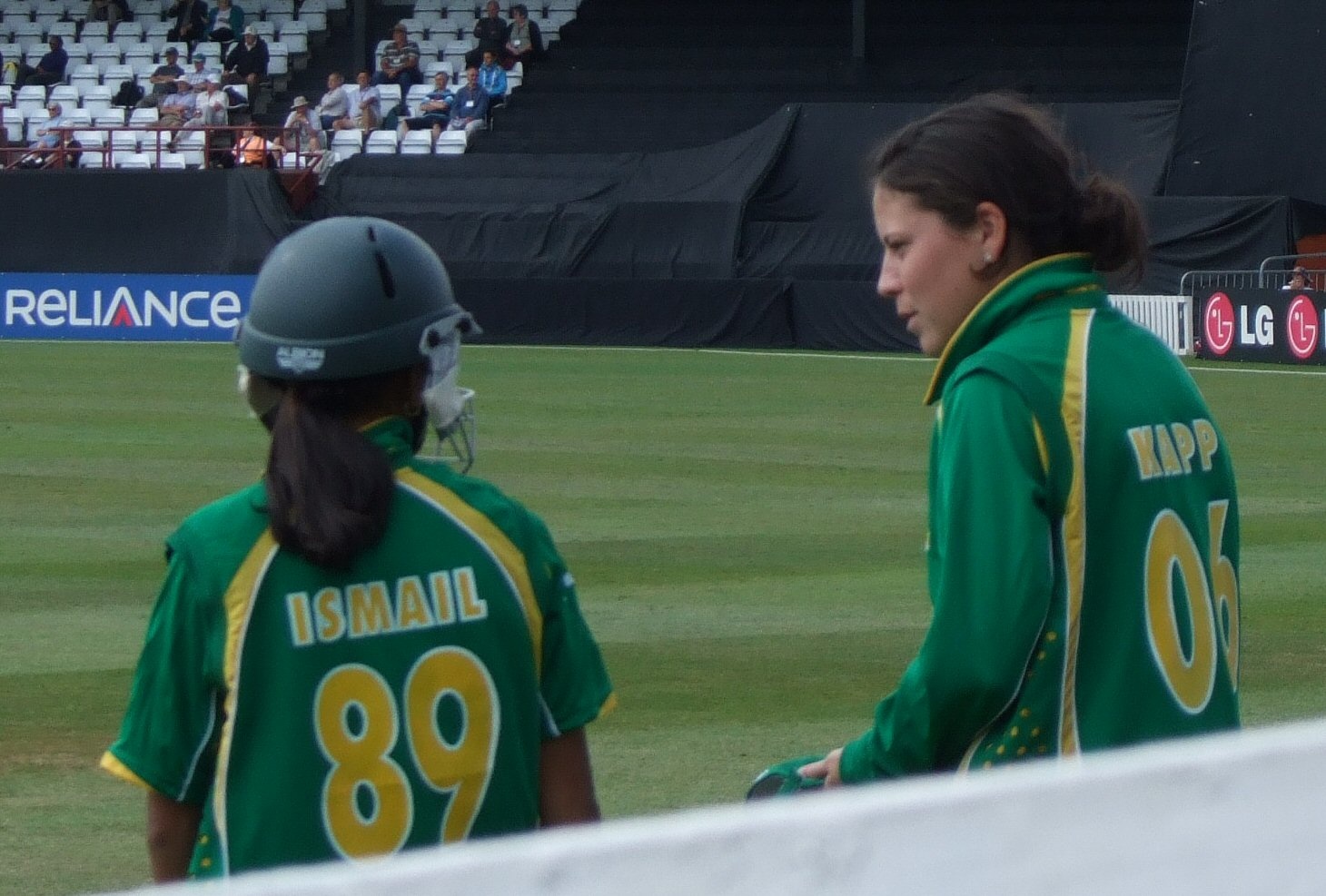
South Africa's leading wicket-taker in the tournament was Shabnim Ismail (left), while their top run-scorer was Marizanne Kapp (right).

South African squad for the 2013 Women's Cricket World Cup
Player	Date of birth	Bat	Bowl	GP	R	A	W	E	C	S
Susan Benade	16 February 1982 (aged 30)	Right	RMF	4	66	16.50	5	5.55	0	0
Cri-zelda Brits	20 November 1983 (aged 29)	Right	RMF	7	133	19.00	–	–	2	0
Trisha Chetty (vc) †	26 June 1988 (aged 24)	Right	–	6	133	22.16	–	–	10	3
Savanna Cordes †	21 February 1994 (aged 18)	Right	–	1	0	0.00	–	–	1	0
Mignon du Preez (c)	13 June 1989 (aged 23)	Right	–	7	104	14.85	–	–	1	0
Shandre Fritz	21 June 1985 (aged 27)	Right	RM	6	171	42.75	–	–	1	0
Shabnim Ismail	5 October 1988 (aged 24)	Left	RFM	7	81	20.25	11	4.08	3	0
Marizanne Kapp	4 January 1990 (aged 23)	Right	RM	5	198	49.50	7	4.05	0	0
Marcia Letsoalo	11 April 1984 (aged 28)	Right	RM	7	7	3.50	5	4.97	3	0
Sunette Loubser	26 September 1982 (aged 30)	Right	OB	6	13	4.33	4	3.80	0	0
Suné Luus	5 January 1996 (aged 17)	Right	LB	2	1	1.00	0	5.00	2	0
Yolandi Potgieter	16 May 1989 (aged 23)	Right	RM	7	50	7.14	2	4.40	1	0
Elriesa Theunissen	2 May 1993 (aged 19)	Right	RM	1	1	1.00	–	–	0	0
Chloe Tryon	25 January 1994 (aged 19)	Right	LMF	4	21	5.25	5	5.34	1	0
Dane van Niekerk	14 May 1993 (aged 19)	Right	LB	7	174	43.50	8	5.29	4	0
Dinesha Devnarain^{W}	12 November 1988 (aged 24)	Right	RM	Replaced by Suné Luus						

== Sri Lanka ==
Sri Lankan squad for the 2013 Women's Cricket World Cup
Player	Date of birth	Bat	Bowl	GP	R	A	W	E	C	S
Chamari Atapattu	9 February 1990 (aged 22)	Left	RM	7	198	28.28	–	–	4	0
Sandamali Dolawatte (vc)	10 February 1983 (aged 29)	Right	LB	7	58	11.60	2	5.35	2	0
Eshani Kaushalya	1 June 1984 (aged 28)	Right	RM	6	168	28.00	5	5.11	1	0
Lasanthi Madushani	12 September 1987 (aged 25)	Right	RF	1	1	1.00	–	–	0	0
Dilani Manodara †	8 December 1982 (aged 30)	Right	–	7	81	20.25	–	–	5	1
Yasoda Mendis	15 September 1986 (aged 26)	Right	RM	6	119	19.83	–	–	1	0
Udeshika Prabodhani	20 September 1985 (aged 27)	Right	LM	4	16	8.00	1	3.07	0	0
Oshadi Ranasinghe	16 March 1986 (aged 26)	Left	RMF	1	1	1.00	1	5.00	1	0
Inoka Ranaweera	18 February 1986 (aged 26)	Left	SLA	4	2	2.00	3	4.76	2	0
Deepika Rasangika	13 December 1983 (aged 29)	Left	LB	7	236	33.71	0	10.00	2	0
Sharina Ravikumar	31 March 1992 (aged 20)	Right	L?	3	2	2.00	3	5.87	0	0
Chamani Seneviratna	14 November 1978 (aged 34)	Right	RM	7	51	10.20	11	4.67	2	0
Shashikala Siriwardene (c)	14 February 1985 (aged 27)	Right	OB	6	150	25.00	10	4.72	1	0
Prasadani Weerakkody	13 November 1988 (aged 24)	Left	–	3	31	10.33	–	–	2	0
Sripali Weerakkody	7 January 1986 (aged 27)	Left	RM	7	58	9.66	5	5.00	1	0

== West Indies ==
West Indian squad for the 2013 Women's Cricket World Cup
Player	Date of birth	Bat	Bowl	GP	R	A	W	E	C	S
Merissa Aguilleira (c) †	14 December 1985 (aged 27)	Right	–	7	112	18.66	–	–	5	0
Shemaine Campbelle	14 October 1992 (aged 20)	Right	RMF	7	84	12.00	0	6.37	2	0
Shanel Daley	25 December 1988 (aged 24)	Left	LM	7	105	21.00	8	3.96	4	0
Deandra Dottin	21 June 1991 (aged 21)	Right	RFM	7	226	32.28	9	4.75	2	0
Kyshona Knight	19 February 1992 (aged 20)	Left	RM	7	134	22.33	1	6.42	3	0
Kycia Knight †	19 February 1992 (aged 20)	Left	–	6	108	18.00	0	6.42	2	0
Natasha McLean	22 December 1994 (aged 18)	Right	–	4	48	12.00	–	–	0	0
Anisa Mohammed	7 August 1988 (aged 24)	Right	OB	5	63	63.00	3	3.87	2	0
Subrina Munroe	11 June 1985 (aged 27)	Right	RMF	2	0	0.00	1	3.35	0	0
Juliana Nero	14 July 1979 (aged 33)	Right	RM	3	3	1.00	–	–	1	0
June Ogle	26 September 1986 (aged 26)	Right	–	0	–	–	–	–	–	–
Shaquana Quintyne	3 January 1996 (aged 17)	Right	LB	6	48	8.00	8	4.19	3	0
Shakera Selman	1 September 1989 (aged 23)	Right	RM	3	8	4.00	1	7.07	3	0
Tremayne Smartt	17 September 1985 (aged 27)	Right	RM	6	17	4.25	7	4.00	0	0
Stafanie Taylor	11 June 1991 (aged 21)	Right	OB	7	314	44.85	7	3.48	2	0
