= 2022 Women's Cricket World Cup squads =

List of cricketers

These were the squads that were named for the 2022 Women's Cricket World Cup. Each team selected a squad of fifteen players for the World Cup, excluding reserves. On 6 January 2022, India became the first to announce their squad for the tournament.

== Key ==
- (c) – Captain
- (vc) – Vice-captain
- (wk) – Wicket-keeper
- (w/d) – Withdrawn player

== Australia ==
In January 2022, Australia's fast bowler Tayla Vlaeminck suffered a stress fracture in her right foot, ruling her out their series against England and the World Cup. On 26 January 2022, Australia named their squad.

- Meg Lanning (c)
- Rachael Haynes (vc)
- Darcie Brown
- Nicola Carey
- Ashleigh Gardner
- Heather Graham
- Grace Harris
- Alyssa Healy
- Jess Jonassen
- Alana King
- Tahlia McGrath
- Beth Mooney
- Ellyse Perry
- Megan Schutt
- Annabel Sutherland
- Amanda-Jade Wellington

Hannah Darlington and Georgia Redmayne were both named as reserve players. Darlington later withdrew from the squad and was replaced by Heather Graham. Graham was eventually added to Australia's squad as a temporary replacement for Ashleigh Gardner, after Gardner gave a positive test for COVID-19.

== Bangladesh ==
On 28 January 2022, Bangladesh named their squad.

- Nigar Sultana (c)
- Rumana Ahmed
- Nahida Akter
- Sharmin Akhter
- Jahanara Alam
- Suraiya Azmin
- Fargana Hoque
- Fahima Khatun
- Murshida Khatun
- Salma Khatun
- Lata Mondal
- Ritu Moni
- Sobhana Mostary
- Shamima Sultana
- Fariha Trisna

Nuzhat Tasnia and Sanjida Akter Meghla were both named as reserve players.

== England ==
On 10 February 2022, England named their squad.

- Heather Knight (c)
- Tammy Beaumont
- Katherine Brunt
- Kate Cross
- Freya Davies
- Charlie Dean
- Sophia Dunkley
- Sophie Ecclestone
- Tash Farrant
- Amy Jones (wk)
- Emma Lamb
- Nat Sciver
- Anya Shrubsole
- Lauren Winfield-Hill
- Danni Wyatt

Lauren Bell and Mady Villiers were both named as reserves.

== India ==
On 6 January 2022, India named their squad.

- Mithali Raj (c)
- Harmanpreet Kaur (vc)
- Taniya Bhatia (wk)
- Yastika Bhatia
- Rajeshwari Gayakwad
- Richa Ghosh (wk)
- Jhulan Goswami
- Smriti Mandhana
- Sneh Rana
- Deepti Sharma
- Meghna Singh
- Renuka Singh
- Pooja Vastrakar
- Shafali Verma
- Poonam Yadav

Simran Bahadur, Ekta Bisht, Sabbhineni Meghana were named as stand-by players.

== New Zealand ==
On 3 February 2022, New Zealand named their squad. Lauren Down was ruled out of New Zealand's squad after suffering an injury during the fifth WODI match against India, with Georgia Plimmer named as her replacement. Molly Penfold was also added to the squad as a reserve player.

- Sophie Devine (c)
- Amy Satterthwaite (vc)
- Suzie Bates
- ~~Lauren Down (w/d)~~
- Maddy Green
- Brooke Halliday
- Hayley Jensen
- Fran Jonas
- Jess Kerr
- Amelia Kerr
- Frances Mackay
- Rosemary Mair
- Katey Martin
- Georgia Plimmer
- Hannah Rowe
- Lea Tahuhu

== Pakistan ==
On 24 January 2022, Pakistan named their squad.

- Bismah Maroof (c)
- Nida Dar (vc)
- Muneeba Ali (wk)
- Sidra Ameen
- Anam Amin
- Aiman Anwer
- Diana Baig
- Ghulam Fatima
- Javeria Khan
- Nahida Khan
- Sidra Nawaz (wk)
- Aliya Riaz
- Fatima Sana
- Nashra Sandhu
- Omaima Sohail

Iram Javed, Najiha Alvi and Tuba Hassan were all named as reserves.

== South Africa ==
In January 2022, South Africa's captain Dane van Niekerk suffered a fractured ankle, ruling her out of their series against the West Indies and the World Cup. On 4 February 2022, South Africa named their squad.

- Suné Luus (c)
- Chloe Tryon (vc)
- Tazmin Brits
- Trisha Chetty
- Lara Goodall
- Shabnim Ismail
- Sinalo Jafta
- Marizanne Kapp
- Ayabonga Khaka
- Masabata Klaas
- Lizelle Lee
- Nonkululeko Mlaba
- Mignon du Preez
- Tumi Sekhukhune
- Laura Wolvaardt

Anneke Bosch, Nadine de Klerk and Raisibe Ntozakhe were all named as reserves.

== West Indies ==
On 20 February 2022, the West Indies named their squad.

- Stafanie Taylor (c)
- Anisa Mohammed (vc)
- Aaliyah Alleyne
- Shemaine Campbelle
- Shamilia Connell
- Deandra Dottin
- Afy Fletcher
- Cherry-Ann Fraser
- Chinelle Henry
- Kycia Knight
- Mandy Mangru
- Hayley Matthews
- Chedean Nation
- Karishma Ramharack
- Shakera Selman
- Rashada Williams

Kaysia Schultz, Mandy Mangru and Jannillea Glasgow were all named as reserves. Mangru was added to the West Indies squad as a replacement for Afy Fletcher, after Fletcher gave a positive test for COVID-19.
