= 2017 Women's Cricket World Cup squads =

List of cricketers

These are the squads for the 2017 Women's Cricket World Cup. The captains of each team were announced on 21 April 2017.

== Key ==
Table headings
Bowling styles
Player notes
- Bat – Handedness when batting
- Bowl – Bowling style
- GP – Games played
- R – Runs scored
- A – Batting average
- W – Wickets taken
- E – Economy rate
- C – Catches
- S – Stumpings
- LM – Left-arm medium
- LF – Left-arm fast
- LFM – Left-arm fast-medium
- LMF – Left-arm medium-fast
- LB – Leg break
- LBG – Leg break googly
- RM – Right-arm medium
- RF – Right-arm fast
- RFM – Right-arm fast-medium
- RMF – Right-arm medium-fast
- RSM – Right-arm slow-medium
- SLA – Slow left-arm orthodox
- OB – Off break
- (c) – Captain
- (vc) – Vice-captain
- † – Wicket-keeper
- ^{W} – Withdrawn player

== Australia ==
Australian squad for the 2017 Women's Cricket World Cup
Player	Date of birth	Bat	Bowl	GP	R	A	W	E	C	S
Sarah Aley	3 June 1984 (aged 33)	Right	RM	1	15	–	2	2.90	1	0
Kristen Beams	6 November 1984 (aged 32)	Right	LBG	7	11	11.00	12	4.09	1	0
Alex Blackwell (vc)	31 August 1983 (aged 33)	Right	RM	8	203	50.75	–	–	3	0
Nicole Bolton	17 January 1989 (aged 28)	Right	OB	8	351	50.14	2	6.00	3	0
Ashleigh Gardner	15 April 1997 (aged 20)	Right	OB	8	38	9.50	8	4.01	3	0
Rachael Haynes	26 December 1986 (aged 30)	Left	LM	2	28	14.00	2	6.00	1	0
Alyssa Healy †	24 March 1990 (aged 27)	Right	–	8	98	32.66	–	–	5	3
Jess Jonassen	5 November 1992 (aged 24)	Left	SLA	7	22	11.00	9	4.18	1	0
Meg Lanning (c)	25 March 1992 (aged 25)	Right	RM	6	328	82.00	–	–	3	0
Beth Mooney †	14 January 1994 (aged 23)	Left	–	8	232	29.00	–	–	2	0
Ellyse Perry	3 November 1990 (aged 26)	Right	RF	8	404	80.80	9	4.60	0	0
Megan Schutt	15 January 1993 (aged 24)	Right	RFM	7	13	6.50	10	4.79	1	0
Belinda Vakarewa	22 January 1998 (aged 19)	Right	RFM	1	–	–	0	5.50	1	0
Elyse Villani	6 October 1989 (aged 27)	Right	RFM	8	148	29.60	5	7.10	5	0
Amanda-Jade Wellington	29 May 1997 (aged 20)	Right	LB	1	–	–	0	4.60	1	0

== England ==
English squad for the 2017 Women's Cricket World Cup
Player	Date of birth	Bat	Bowl	GP	R	A	W	E	C	S
Tammy Beaumont †	11 March 1991 (aged 26)	Right	–	9	410	45.55	–	–	3	0
Katherine Brunt	2 July 1985 (aged 31)	Right	RMF	9	151	21.57	5	3.77	3	0
Georgia Elwiss	31 May 1991 (aged 26)	Right	RMF	0	–	–	–	–	–	–
Jenny Gunn	9 May 1986 (aged 31)	Right	RMF	7	125	31.25	5	4.41	2	0
Alex Hartley	6 September 1993 (aged 23)	Right	SLA	8	2	–	10	4.19	0	0
Danielle Hazell	13 May 1988 (aged 29)	Right	OB	5	4	4.00	6	5.54	1	0
Heather Knight (c)	26 December 1990 (aged 26)	Right	OB	9	364	45.50	8	4.86	1	0
Beth Langston	6 September 1992 (aged 24)	Right	RM	0	–	–	–	–	–	–
Laura Marsh	5 December 1986 (aged 30)	Right	RFM / OB	5	51	51.00	6	4.00	1	0
Nat Sciver	20 August 1992 (aged 24)	Right	RFM	9	369	46.12	7	4.87	6	0
Anya Shrubsole	7 December 1991 (aged 25)	Right	RFM	9	27	9.00	12	4.62	1	0
Sarah Taylor †	20 May 1989 (aged 28)	Right	–	9	396	49.50	–	–	4	2
Fran Wilson	7 November 1991 (aged 25)	Right	OB	8	159	26.50	–	–	4	0
Lauren Winfield †	16 August 1990 (aged 26)	Right	–	7	117	16.71	–	–	2	0
Danni Wyatt	22 April 1991 (aged 26)	Right	OB	5	81	40.50	–	–	1	0

== India ==
Indian squad for the 2017 Women's Cricket World Cup
Player	Date of birth	Bat	Bowl	GP	R	A	W	E	C	S
Ekta Bisht	8 February 1986 (aged 31)	Left	SLA	6	14	7.00	9	4.39	0	0
Rajeshwari Gayakwad	1 June 1991 (aged 26)	Right	SLA	3	0	0.00	7	4.75	0	0
Jhulan Goswami	25 November 1983 (aged 33)	Right	RF	9	68	17.00	10	4.14	7	0
Mansi Joshi	6 November 1992 (aged 24)	Right	RMF	2	6	6.00	2	4.02	1	0
Harmanpreet Kaur	8 March 1989 (aged 28)	Right	RMF	9	359	59.83	5	5.25	1	0
Veda Krishnamurthy	16 October 1992 (aged 24)	Right	LB	6	153	30.60	0	11.00	4	0
Smriti Mandhana	18 July 1996 (aged 20)	Left	OB	9	232	29.00	–	–	5	0
Mona Meshram	30 September 1991 (aged 25)	Right	RM	3	24	24.00	0	5.00	1	0
Shikha Pandey	12 May 1989 (aged 28)	Right	RM	7	11	3.66	8	4.32	1	0
Nuzhat Parween †	9 May 1996 (aged 21)	Right	–	0	–	–	–	–	–	–
Poonam Yadav	24 August 1991 (aged 25)	Right	LBG	9	7	7.00	11	3.86	0	0
Mithali Raj (c)	3 December 1982 (aged 34)	Right	LB	9	409	45.44	–	–	1	0
Poonam Raut	14 October 1989 (aged 27)	Right	OB	9	381	42.33	–	–	1	0
Deepti Sharma	24 August 1997 (aged 19)	Left	OB	9	216	30.85	12	4.70	4	0
Sushma Verma †	5 November 1992 (aged 24)	Right	–	9	51	12.75	–	–	7	8

== New Zealand ==
New Zealand squad for the 2017 Women's Cricket World Cup
Player	Date of birth	Bat	Bowl	GP	R	A	W	E	C	S
Suzie Bates (c)	16 September 1987 (aged 29)	Right	RMF	6	242	80.66	1	5.92	2	0
Erin Bermingham	18 April 1988 (aged 29)	Right	LB	3	54	27.00	1	5.09	0	0
Sophie Devine	1 September 1989 (aged 27)	Right	RMF	6	126	25.20	3	4.09	0	0
Maddy Green	20 October 1992 (aged 24)	Right	OB	3	5	5.00	–	–	0	0
Holly Huddleston	11 October 1987 (aged 29)	Right	RMF	4	1	1.00	6	3.89	1	0
Leigh Kasperek	15 February 1992 (aged 25)	Right	OB	4	3	1.50	10	3.65	3	0
Amelia Kerr	13 October 2000 (aged 16)	Right	LB	6	13	6.50	10	4.48	1	0
Katey Martin †	7 February 1985 (aged 32)	Right	–	6	44	14.66	–	–	1	0
Thamsyn Newton	3 June 1995 (aged 22)	Right	RM	0	–	–	–	–	–	–
Katie Perkins	7 July 1988 (aged 28)	Right	RM	6	96	48.00	–	–	1	0
Anna Peterson	12 September 1990 (aged 26)	Right	OB	2	7	7.00	2	3.37	2	0
Rachel Priest †	13 June 1985 (aged 32)	Right	–	6	125	20.83	–	–	5	2
Hannah Rowe	3 October 1996 (aged 20)	Right	RM	2	4	4.00	5	2.73	1	0
Amy Satterthwaite (vc)	7 October 1986 (aged 30)	Left	OB	6	198	66.00	1	3.58	8	0
Lea Tahuhu	23 September 1990 (aged 26)	Right	RF	6	20	10.00	9	4.75	3	0

== Pakistan ==
Pakistani squad for the 2017 Women's Cricket World Cup
Player	Date of birth	Bat	Bowl	GP	R	A	W	E	C	S
Asmavia Iqbal	1 January 1988 (aged 29)	Right	RMF	0	–	–	–	–	–	–
Ayesha Zafar	9 September 1994 (aged 22)	Right	LB	0	–	–	–	–	–	–
Bismah Maroof	18 July 1991 (aged 25)	Left	LB	0	–	–	–	–	–	–
Diana Baig	15 October 1995 (aged 21)	Right	RM	0	–	–	–	–	–	–
Ghulam Fatima	5 October 1995 (aged 21)	Right	LB	0	–	–	–	–	–	–
Javeria Khan	14 May 1988 (aged 29)	Right	OB	0	–	–	–	–	–	–
Kainat Imtiaz	21 June 1992 (aged 25)	Right	RMF	0	–	–	–	–	–	–
Marina Iqbal	7 March 1987 (aged 30)	Right	RMF	0	–	–	–	–	–	–
Nahida Khan	3 November 1986 (aged 30)	Right	RM	0	–	–	–	–	–	–
Nain Abidi	23 May 1985 (aged 32)	Right	–	0	–	–	–	–	–	–
Nashra Sandhu	19 November 1997 (aged 19)	Right	SLA	0	–	–	–	–	–	–
Sadia Yousuf	4 November 1989 (aged 27)	Right	SLA	0	–	–	–	–	–	–
Sana Mir (c)	5 January 1986 (aged 31)	Right	OB	0	–	–	–	–	–	–
Sidra Nawaz †	14 March 1994 (aged 23)	Right	–	0	–	–	–	–	–	–
Waheeda Akhtar	10 April 1995 (aged 22)	Right	RMF	0	–	–	–	–	–	–

Bismah Maroof injured her hand during Pakistan's match against England and was ruled out of the rest of the tournament. She was replaced by Iram Javed.

== South Africa ==
South African squad for the 2017 Women's Cricket World Cup
Player	Date of birth	Bat	Bowl	GP	R	A	W	E	C	S
Trisha Chetty †	26 June 1988 (aged 28)	Right	–	0	–	–	–	–	–	–
Moseline Daniels	1 February 1990 (aged 27)	Left	LM	0	–	–	–	–	–	–
Nadine de Klerk	16 January 2000 (aged 17)	Right	RMF	0	–	–	–	–	–	–
Mignon du Preez	13 June 1989 (aged 28)	Right	–	0	–	–	–	–	–	–
Shabnim Ismail	5 October 1988 (aged 28)	Left	RF	0	–	–	–	–	–	–
Marizanne Kapp	4 January 1990 (aged 27)	Right	RFM	0	–	–	–	–	–	–
Ayabonga Khaka	18 July 1992 (aged 24)	Right	RM	0	–	–	–	–	–	–
Masabata Klaas	3 February 1991 (aged 26)	Right	RM	0	–	–	–	–	–	–
Lizelle Lee	2 April 1992 (aged 25)	Right	RMF	0	–	–	–	–	–	–
Suné Luus	5 January 1996 (aged 21)	Right	LB	0	–	–	–	–	–	–
Raisibe Ntozakhe	29 November 1996 (aged 20)	Right	OB	0	–	–	–	–	–	–
Andrie Steyn	23 November 1996 (aged 20)	Right	RMF	0	–	–	–	–	–	–
Chloe Tryon	25 January 1994 (aged 23)	Right	LMF	0	–	–	–	–	–	–
Dane van Niekerk (c)	14 May 1993 (aged 24)	Right	LB	0	–	–	–	–	–	–
Laura Wolvaardt	26 April 1999 (aged 18)	Right	–	0	–	–	–	–	–	–

Andrie Steyn was injured in a training session and was replaced by Odine Kirsten.

== Sri Lanka ==
Sri Lankan squad for the 2017 Women's Cricket World Cup
Player	Date of birth	Bat	Bowl	GP	R	A	W	E	C	S
Chandima Gunaratne	24 February 1982 (aged 35)	Left	SLA	0	–	–	–	–	–	–
Nipuni Hansika	3 August 1994 (aged 22)	Left	RMF	0	–	–	–	–	–	–
Chamari Athapaththu	9 February 1990 (aged 27)	Left	OB	0	–	–	–	–	–	–
Ama Kanchana	7 April 1991 (aged 26)	Right	RFM	0	–	–	–	–	–	–
Eshani Kaushalya	1 June 1984 (aged 33)	Right	RM	0	–	–	–	–	–	–
Chamari Polgampola	20 March 1981 (aged 36)	Left	RMF	0	–	–	–	–	–	–
Harshitha Samarawickrama	29 June 1998 (aged 18)	Left	RSM	0	–	–	–	–	–	–
Hasini Perera	27 June 1995 (aged 21)	Left	RMF	0	–	–	–	–	–	–
Udeshika Prabodhani	20 September 1985 (aged 31)	Right	LM	0	–	–	–	–	–	–
Oshadi Ranasinghe	16 March 1986 (aged 31)	Left	RMF	0	–	–	–	–	–	–
Inoka Ranaweera (c)	18 February 1986 (aged 31)	Left	SLA	0	–	–	–	–	–	–
Shashikala Siriwardene	14 February 1985 (aged 32)	Right	OB	0	–	–	–	–	–	–
Dilani Manodara †	8 December 1982 (aged 34)	Right	–	0	–	–	–	–	–	–
Prasadani Weerakkody †	13 November 1988 (aged 28)	Left	–	0	–	–	–	–	–	–
Sripali Weerakkody	7 January 1986 (aged 31)	Left	RM	0	–	–	–	–	–	–

== West Indies ==
West Indian squad for the 2017 Women's Cricket World Cup
Player	Date of birth	Bat	Bowl	GP	R	A	W	E	C	S
Merissa Aguilleira †	14 December 1985 (aged 31)	Right	–	0	–	–	–	–	–	–
Reniece Boyce †	3 September 1997 (aged 19)	Right	–	0	–	–	–	–	–	–
Shamilia Connell	14 July 1992 (aged 24)	Right	RF	0	–	–	–	–	–	–
Shanel Daley	25 December 1988 (aged 28)	Left	LM	0	–	–	–	–	–	–
Deandra Dottin	21 June 1991 (aged 26)	Right	RFM	0	–	–	–	–	–	–
Afy Fletcher	17 March 1987 (aged 30)	Right	OB	0	–	–	–	–	–	–
Qiana Joseph	1 January 2001 (aged 16)	Right	LF	0	–	–	–	–	–	–
Kyshona Knight	19 February 1992 (aged 25)	Left	RM	0	–	–	–	–	–	–
Hayley Matthews	19 March 1998 (aged 19)	Right	OB	0	–	–	–	–	–	–
Anisa Mohammed	7 August 1988 (aged 28)	Right	OB	0	–	–	–	–	–	–
Chedean Nation	31 October 1986 (aged 30)	Right	RM	0	–	–	–	–	–	–
Akeira Peters	30 September 1993 (aged 23)	Left	RM	0	–	–	–	–	–	–
Shakera Selman	1 September 1989 (aged 27)	Right	RM	0	–	–	–	–	–	–
Stafanie Taylor (c)	11 June 1991 (aged 26)	Right	OB	0	–	–	–	–	–	–
Felicia Walters	6 January 1992 (aged 25)	Right	RSM	0	–	–	–	–	–	–

Both Shakera Selman and Shamilia Connell suffered injuries and were replaced by Subrina Munroe and Kycia Knight.
