= Piumi Wathsala =

Sri Lankan cricketer (born 1995)

Personal information
- Full name: Piumi Wathsala Dore Mure Badalge
- Born: 9 November 1995 (age 31)
- Batting: Right-handed
- Bowling: Right-arm medium-fast
- Role: Batting All-rounder

International information
- National side: Sri Lanka
- ODI debut (cap 81): 27 April 2025 v India
- Last ODI: 11 May 2025 v India
- ODI shirt no.: 44

Domestic team information
- Years: Team
- 2023: Panadura Sports Club

Career statistics
| Competition | ODI |
|---|---|
| Matches | 2 |
| Runs scored | 11 |
| Batting average | 5.50 |
| 100s/50s | 0/0 |
| Top score | 9 |
| Balls bowled | 30 |
| Wickets | 0 |
| Bowling average | – |
| 5 wickets in innings | – |
| 10 wickets in match | – |
| Best bowling | – |
| Catches/stumpings | 1/– |
- Source: Cricinfo, 11 July 2025

Piumi Wathsala Dore Mure Badalge (born 9 November 1995) also known as Piumi Wathsala, is a Sri Lankan cricketer who plays for the Sri Lanka women's cricket team as a right-hand batter.

== Career ==
In 2019, Wathsala has played for Dambulla in Women's Super Provincial T20 cricket tournament.

Wathsala played for Panadura Sports Club as a captain in domestic cricket. In 2023 she scored a century (119 off 102) against Burgher Recreation Club. In same year in April, she was named in Sri Lanka Cricket Board XI team for the warm up match against Bangladesh.

In April 2025, Wathsala named in Sri Lanka national team for the ODI Tri-Nation series against India and South Africa. She made her ODI debut in same tournament against India on 27 April 2025.
