= Shuchi Upadhyay =

Indian cricketer (born 2004)

Personal information
- Full name: Shuchi Sudhir Upadhyay
- Born: 31 December 2004 (age 21); Madhya Pradesh, India
- Batting: Right-handed
- Bowling: Slow left-arm orthodox
- Role: Bowler

International information
- National side: India
- Only ODI (cap 155): 7 May 2025 v South Africa
- ODI shirt no.: 91

Domestic team information
- Years: Team
- 2024–present: Madhya Pradesh

Career statistics
Competition	FC	LA	T20
Matches	2	14	7
Runs scored	–	19	–
Batting average	–	–	–
100s/50s	–	0/0	–
Top score	–	8*	–
Balls bowled	383	756	150
Wickets	6	22	7
Bowling average	36.00	21.09	19.14
5 wickets in innings	0	1	0
10 wickets in match	0	0	0
Best bowling	4/94	5/48	2/11
Catches/stumpings	0/–	1/–	0/–
- Source: ESPNcricinfo, 17 May 2025

Shuchi Upadhyay (born 25 August 2004) is an Indian cricketer who plays for the national team. She represents Madhya Pradesh in domestic cricket.

== Domestic career ==
Upadhyay plays domestic cricket for Madhya Pradesh women's cricket team. She made her first-class debut for India C against India A, on 31 March 2025, in the Senior Women's Three Day Challenger Trophy 2024/25. She made her List A debut against Manipur, on 4 December 2024, in the Inter State Women's One Day Competition 2024/25. She made her T20 debut against Delhi, on 17 October 2024, in the Inter State Women's Twenty20 Competition 2024/25.

== International career ==
In April 2025, she earned maiden call-up for national team for the 2025 Sri Lanka Women's Tri-Nation Series. She made her ODI debut in the same tournament, on 7 May 2025 against South Africa. In May 2025, she was named in ODI and T20I squad for the series against England. Later in June 2025, she was ruled out of the series due to a left shin injury and Radha Yadav named as her replacement.
