= 2025 Sri Lanka Women's Tri-Nation Series =

Cricket tournament

- Date: 27 April – 11 May 2025
- Location: Sri Lanka
- Result: India won the series
- Player of the series: (India) Sneh Rana
Teams
Sri Lanka	India	South Africa
Captains
Chamari Athapaththu	Harmanpreet Kaur	Laura Wolvaardt (Note: Chloe Tryon captained South Africa in the fifth ODI.)
Most runs
Harshitha Samarawickrama (203)	Smriti Mandhana (264)	Annerie Dercksen (276)
Most wickets
Dewmi Vihanga (11)	Sneh Rana (15)	Nonkululeko Mlaba (6); Chloe Tryon (6)

The 2025 Sri Lanka Women's Tri-Nation Series was a cricket series that took place in Sri Lanka in April and May 2025. It was a tri-nation series involving India, South Africa and Sri Lanka cricket teams, with the matches played in One Day International (ODI) format. It was the first women's tri-nation international series hosted by Sri Lanka. The series served as preparation ahead of the 2025 Women's Cricket World Cup. All of the matches were played at the R. Premadasa Stadium in Colombo in a double round-robin format. In the final, India defeated Sri Lanka by 97 runs to win the series.

== Squads ==
Sri Lanka	India	South Africa
Chamari Athapaththu (c); Kavisha Dilhari; Vishmi Gunaratne; Hansima Karunaratne; Achini Kulasuriya; Sugandika Kumari; Malki Madara; Manudi Nanayakkara; Hasini Perera; Inoshi Priyadharshani; Inoka Ranaweera; Harshitha Samarawickrama; Anushka Sanjeewani (wk); Rashmika Sewwandi; Nilakshi de Silva; Dewmi Vihanga; Piumi Wathsala	Harmanpreet Kaur (c); Smriti Mandhana (vc); Yastika Bhatia (wk); Shree Charani; Harleen Deol; Kashvee Gautam; Richa Ghosh (wk); Kranti Goud; Tejal Hasabnis; Amanjot Kaur; Sneh Rana; Pratika Rawal; Arundhati Reddy; Jemimah Rodrigues; Deepti Sharma; Shuchi Upadhyay	Laura Wolvaardt (c); ~~Anneke Bosch~~; Tazmin Brits; Nadine de Klerk; Annerie Dercksen; Lara Goodall; Sinalo Jafta (wk); Ayabonga Khaka; Masabata Klaas; Suné Luus; Karabo Meso (wk); Nonkululeko Mlaba; Seshnie Naidu; Nondumiso Shangase; Miané Smit; Chloe Tryon

On 17 April, Anneke Bosch was ruled out the series due to illness, and was replaced by Lara Goodall.

On 6 May, Kashvee Gautam was ruled out of the tournament due to injury, with Kranti Goud named as her replacement.

== Points table ==
Pos	Team	Pld	W	L	T	NR	Pts	NRR	Qualification
1	India	4	3	1	0	0	6	0.457	Advanced to the final
2	Sri Lanka (H)	4	2	2	0	0	4	−0.542	Advanced to the final
3	South Africa	4	1	3	0	0	2	0.083	

Source: ESPNcricinfo
(H) Host

== Fixtures ==
=== 1st ODI ===
27 April 2025
10:00
Scorecard

Sri Lanka; 147 (38.1 overs)	v	India; 149/1 (29.4 overs)
Hasini Perera 30 (46); Sneh Rana 3/31 (8 overs)		Pratika Rawal 50* (62); Inoka Ranaweera 1/32 (7.4 overs)

India won by 9 wickets
R. Premadasa Stadium, Colombo
Umpires: Anna Harris (Eng) and Nimali Perera (SL)
Player of the match: Pratika Rawal (Ind)

- India won the toss and elected to field.
- The match was reduced to 39 overs per side due to rain and wet outfield.
- Malki Madara, Piumi Wathsala (SL), Shree Charani and Kashvee Gautam (Ind) all made their ODI debuts.

=== 2nd ODI ===
29 April 2025
10:00
Scorecard

India; 276/6 (50 overs)	v	South Africa; 261 (49.2 overs)
Pratika Rawal 78 (91); Nonkululeko Mlaba 2/55 (10 overs)		Tazmin Brits 109 (107); Sneh Rana 5/43 (10 overs)

India won by 15 runs
R. Premadasa Stadium, Colombo
Umpires: Anna Harris (Eng) and Dedunu Silva (SL)
Player of the match: Sneh Rana (Ind)

- India won the toss and elected to bat.
- Karabo Meso (SA) made her ODI debut.
- Sneh Rana (Ind) took her first five-wicket haul in ODIs.

=== 3rd ODI ===
2 May 2025
10:00
Scorecard

South Africa; 235/9 (50 overs)	v	Sri Lanka; 237/5 (46.3 overs)
Annerie Dercksen 61* (60); Malki Madara 4/50 (10 overs)		Harshitha Samarawickrama 77 (93); Nonkululeko Mlaba 2/44 (10 overs)

Sri Lanka won by 5 wickets
R. Premadasa Stadium, Colombo
Umpires: Anna Harris (Eng) and Nimali Perera (SL)
Player of the match: Harshitha Samarawickrama (SL)

- Sri Lanka won the toss and elected to field.
- Dewmi Vihanga (SL) made her ODI debut.
- Kavisha Dilhari played in her 100th international match.
- Harshitha Samarawickrama and Kavisha Dilhari's 128 run partnership became the Sri Lanka's highest for the 4th wicket in women's ODIs, breaking the record of 118 between Chamani Seneviratne and Hiroshi Abeysinghe in 2002.

=== 4th ODI ===
4 May 2025
10:00
Scorecard

India; 275/9 (50 overs)	v	Sri Lanka; 278/7 (49.1 overs)
Richa Ghosh 58 (48); Chamari Athapaththu 3/43 (10 overs)		Nilakshi de Silva 56 (33); Sneh Rana 3/45 (10 overs)

Sri Lanka won by 3 wickets
R. Premadasa Stadium, Colombo
Umpires: Anna Harris (Eng) and Dedunu Silva (SL)
Player of the match: Nilakshi de Silva (SL)

- Sri Lanka won the toss and elected to field.
- Smriti Mandhana (Ind) played in her 100th ODI match.
- This was the highest match aggregate (553) involving India and Sri Lanka in women's ODIs.

=== 5th ODI ===
7 May 2025
10:00
Scorecard

India; 337/9 (50 overs)	v	South Africa; 314/7 (50 overs)
Jemimah Rodrigues 123 (101); Nadine de Klerk 2/54 (9 overs)		Annerie Dercksen 81 (80); Amanjot Kaur 3/59 (9 overs)

India won by 23 runs
R. Premadasa Stadium, Colombo
Umpires: Anna Harris (Eng) and Nimali Perera (SL)
Player of the match: Jemimah Rodrigues (Ind)

- South Africa won the toss and elected to field.
- Shuchi Upadhyay (Ind) and Miané Smit (SA) both made their ODI debuts.
- Deepti Sharma and Jemimah Rodrigues's 122 run partnership became the India's highest for the 5th wicket in women's ODIs, breaking the record of 108 between Mithali Raj and Veda Krishnamurthy in 2017.
- This was the highest match aggregate (651) involving India and South Africa in women's ODIs.

=== 6th ODI ===
9 May 2025
10:00
Scorecard

South Africa; 315/9 (50 overs)	v	Sri Lanka; 239 (42.5 overs)
Annerie Dercksen 104 (84); Dewmi Vihanga 5/43 (9 overs)		Chamari Athapaththu 52 (57); Chloe Tryon 5/34 (8 overs)

South Africa won by 76 runs
R. Premadasa Stadium, Colombo
Umpires: Anna Harris (Eng) and Dedunu Silva (SL)
Player of the match: Chloe Tryon (SA)

- Sri Lanka won the toss and elected to field.
- Seshnie Naidu (SA) made her ODI debut.
- Dewmi Vihanga (SL) took her first five-wicket haul in ODIs.
- Annerie Dercksen (SA) scored her maiden century in ODIs.
- Annerie Dercksen and Chloe Tryon's 112 run partnership became South Africa's highest for the 7th wicket in women's ODIs, breaking the record of 94 between Cindy Eksteen and Ally Kuylaars in 2000.
- Chloe Tryon (SA) took her first five-wicket haul and first hat-trick in ODIs.

== Final ==
11 May 2025
10:00
Scorecard

India; 342/7 (50 overs)	v	Sri Lanka; 245 (48.2 overs)
Smriti Mandhana 116 (101); Sugandika Kumari 2/59 (10 overs)		Chamari Athapaththu 51 (66); Sneh Rana 4/38 (9.2 overs)

India won by 97 runs
R. Premadasa Stadium, Colombo
Umpires: Anna Harris (Eng) and Nimali Perera (SL)
Player of the match: Smriti Mandhana (Ind)

- India won the toss and elected to bat.
- Kranti Goud (Ind) made her ODI debut.

== Statistics ==
Leading run-scorers
Name	Team	Runs	Innings
Annerie Dercksen	South Africa	276	4
Smriti Mandhana	India	264	5
Jemimah Rodrigues	India	245	4
Harshitha Samarawickrama	Sri Lanka	203	5
Chloe Tryon	South Africa	194	4
Pratika Rawal	India	194	5

Leading wicket-takers
Name	Team	Wickets	Matches
Sneh Rana	India	15	5
Dewmi Vihanga	Sri Lanka	11	4
Amanjot Kaur	India	6	2
Nonkululeko Mlaba	South Africa	6	3
Chloe Tryon	South Africa	6	4
Sugandika Kumari	Sri Lanka	6	4
Shree Charani	India	6	5
Malki Madara	Sri Lanka	6	5

== Broadcasting ==
This is the list of channels for the Sri Lanka and Global.

Territory	Rights holder(s)
Sri Lanka	TV: ThePapare 2 on Dialog Television; Digital: ThePapare.com (Website and Facebook) & Dialog VIU App; YouTube: Sri Lanka Cricket
India	TV & Digital: FanCode
Global	YouTube: Sri Lanka Cricket
