= Shree Charani =

Indian cricketer (born 2004)

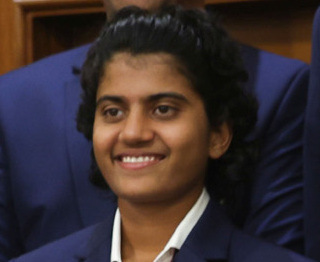
- Shree Charani in 2025

Personal information
- Full name: Nallapureddy Shree Charani
- Born: 4 August 2004 (age 22); Kamalapuram, YSR Kadapa district, Andhra Pradesh, India
- Batting: Left-handed
- Bowling: Slow left-arm orthodox
- Role: Bowler

International information
- National side: India (2025–present)
- ODI debut (cap 154): 27 April 2025 v Sri Lanka
- Last ODI: 21 February 2026 v Australia
- ODI shirt no.: 40
- T20I debut (cap 87): 28 June 2025 v England
- Last T20I: 22 September 2026 v Sri Lanka
- T20I shirt no.: 40

Domestic team information
- Years: Team
- 2022–present: Andhra
- 2025–present: Delhi Capitals

Career statistics
Competition	WODI	WT20I	FC	LA
Matches	21	25	3	22
Runs scored	22	9	62	135
Batting average	3.66	4.5	15.50	12.27
100s/50s	-/-	-/-	0/0	0/0
Top score	11	7	29	38
Balls bowled	1088	563	572	1,074
Wickets	27	50	9	23
Bowling average	38.19	16.24	23.66	30.78
5 wickets in innings	0	0	1	0
10 wickets in match	0	0	0	0
Best bowling	3/41	4/12	6/79	3/13
Catches/stumpings	4/–	9/–	0/–	4/–
Medal record
Women's cricket
Representing India
ICC Cricket World Cup
Winner	2025 India
Asian Games
Gold medal – first place	Aichi–Nagoya 2026
ACC Asia Cup
Winner	2026 UAE
- Source: ESPNcricinfo, 19 May 2025

Nallapureddy Shree Charani (born 4 August 2004) is an Indian international cricketer. She represents Andhra in domestic cricket and Delhi Capitals in the Women's Premier League. Charani was part of the Indian team that won the 2025 Women's Cricket World Cup.

== Early and personal life ==
Charani was born into a Telugu speaking family from Yeramala Palli Village in Veerapunayunipalle mandal of Kadapa district, Andhra Pradesh, India. She became the first woman from the YSR Kadapa district in Andhra Pradesh to be selected for the Indian cricket team at the age of 20. Her father pushed her into badminton, when she was in class six. Her father, Chandrasekhar Reddy, works in a minor position at the Rayalaseema Thermal Power Project. She also played kho-kho before entering into cricket. Her uncle, Kishore Kumar Reddy, supported her in training and taking to sport. Her biggest inspiration was Smriti Mandhana and Yuvraj Singh. She was handed debut WPL cap by Jess Jonassen and her first WPL wicket was Ellyse Perry.

== Domestic career ==
In the third WPL auction in December 2024, Charani was purchased by the Delhi Capitals franchise for ₹ 55 lakh. In March 2025, she took a maiden five-wicket haul in first-class cricket against India B in Senior Women's Multi-day Challenger Trophy at the Rajiv Gandhi Stadium in Dehradun. Charani plays domestic cricket for Andhra women's cricket team.

== International career ==
In April 2025, she earned maiden call-up for national team for the ODI Tri-Series against Sri Lanka and South Africa. She made her ODI debut in following tournament against Sri Lanka, on 27 April 2025. In May 2025, she was named in ODI and T20I squad for the series against England. She made her T20I debut in same series and took four wickets on 28 June 2025. She became the second Indian women cricketers to take four wickets on T20I debut after Sravanthi Naidu. She played a key role in Women's odi world cup winning squad of 2025
