= Kranti Gaud =

Indian cricketer (born 2003)

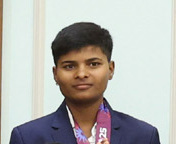
- Gaud in 2025

Personal information
- Born: 11 August 2003 (age 23); Ghuwara, Madhya Pradesh, India
- Batting: Right-handed
- Bowling: Right-arm medium-fast
- Role: Bowler

International information
- National side: India (2025–present)
- Only Test (cap 96): 6 March 2026 v Australia
- ODI debut (cap 156): 11 May 2025 v Sri Lanka
- Last ODI: 2 November 2025 v South Africa
- ODI shirt no.: 26
- T20I debut (cap 88): 12 July 2025 v England
- Last T20I: 26 December 2025 v Sri Lanka
- T20I shirt no.: 26

Domestic team information
- Years: Team
- 2023/24–present: Madhya Pradesh
- 2025–present: UP Warriorz

Career statistics
Competition	WTest	WODI	WT20I	LA
Matches	2	4	1	16
Runs scored	1	4	0	17
Batting average	1.00	–	–	5.66
100s/50s	0/0	0/0	–	0/0
Top score	1	4*	–	12
Balls bowled	234	161	18	647
Wickets	7	9	0	25
Bowling average	15.57	17.55	–	19.36
5 wickets in innings	1	1	–	1
10 wickets in match	0	0	–	0
Best bowling	5/37	6/52	–	6/52
Catches/stumpings	0/–	0/–	0/–	4/–
Medal record
Women's cricket
Representing India
ICC Cricket World Cup
Winner	2025 India
Asian Games
Gold medal – first place	Aichi–Nagoya 2026
ACC Asia Cup
Winner	2026 UAE
- Source: ESPNcricinfo, 6 August 2025

Kranti Gaud (born 11 August 2003) is an Indian international cricketer. She represents Madhya Pradesh in domestic cricket and UP Warriorz in the Women's Premier League. Gaud was a part of the Indian team that won the 2025 Women's Cricket World Cup.

== Domestic career ==
Gaud plays domestic cricket for Madhya Pradesh women's cricket team. She took 4 wickets in the final of the 2024–25 Senior Women's One Day Trophy against Bengal. She also played for Madhya Pradesh Under-23 team.

In the third WPL auction in December 2024, Gaud was purchased by the UP Warriorz for ₹10 lakh. Her first WPL wicket came against Delhi Capitals on 22 February, when she clean-bowled DC captain Meg Lanning. In this fixture, she became the second youngest player to take a four-wicket haul in the WPL, after Issy Wong in 2023.

== International career ==
In April 2025, Gaud was selected in the national team as a replacement player for Kashvee Gautam in the Sri Lanka Tri-Nation Series. She made her ODI debut in the final of the Tri-Series, on 11 May against hosts Sri Lanka. She was later named in the ODI and T20I squads for the away series against England. Gaud made her T20I debut in that series, on 12 July. In the third and final ODI, with the series level at 1–1, played in Chester-le-Street, she claimed her first five-wicket haul, helping India win by 13 runs. She returned figures of 6/52, and at 21 years and 345 days, became the youngest India player to take a five-for in a women's ODI, surpassing Jhulan Goswami's record.

After consistent performances, Gaud was named in the squad for the 2025 World Cup. On 5 October, in India's group stage fixture against Pakistan in Colombo, she claimed three wickets and helped her team win by 88 runs. She was the Player of the Match.

In a one-off Test match against England at Lord's, Gaud took a five-wicket haul in England's first innings, ending with figures of 5/37. With this spell, she became the first woman to get a Test match 5-wicket haul at Lord's. Gaud went on to take two further wickets in England's second innings, as India won the Test match by 270 runs. She was later adjudged to be the player of the match.

During the Women's Asia Cup final against Sri Lanka on September 13, 2026, Gaud was fined 10% of her match fee for breaking Article 2.5 of the ICC Code of Conduct. She also received one demerit point on her disciplinary record, marking her first penalty in a 24- month period.
