= Heather Knight =

English cricketer (born 1990)

Heather Knight OBE
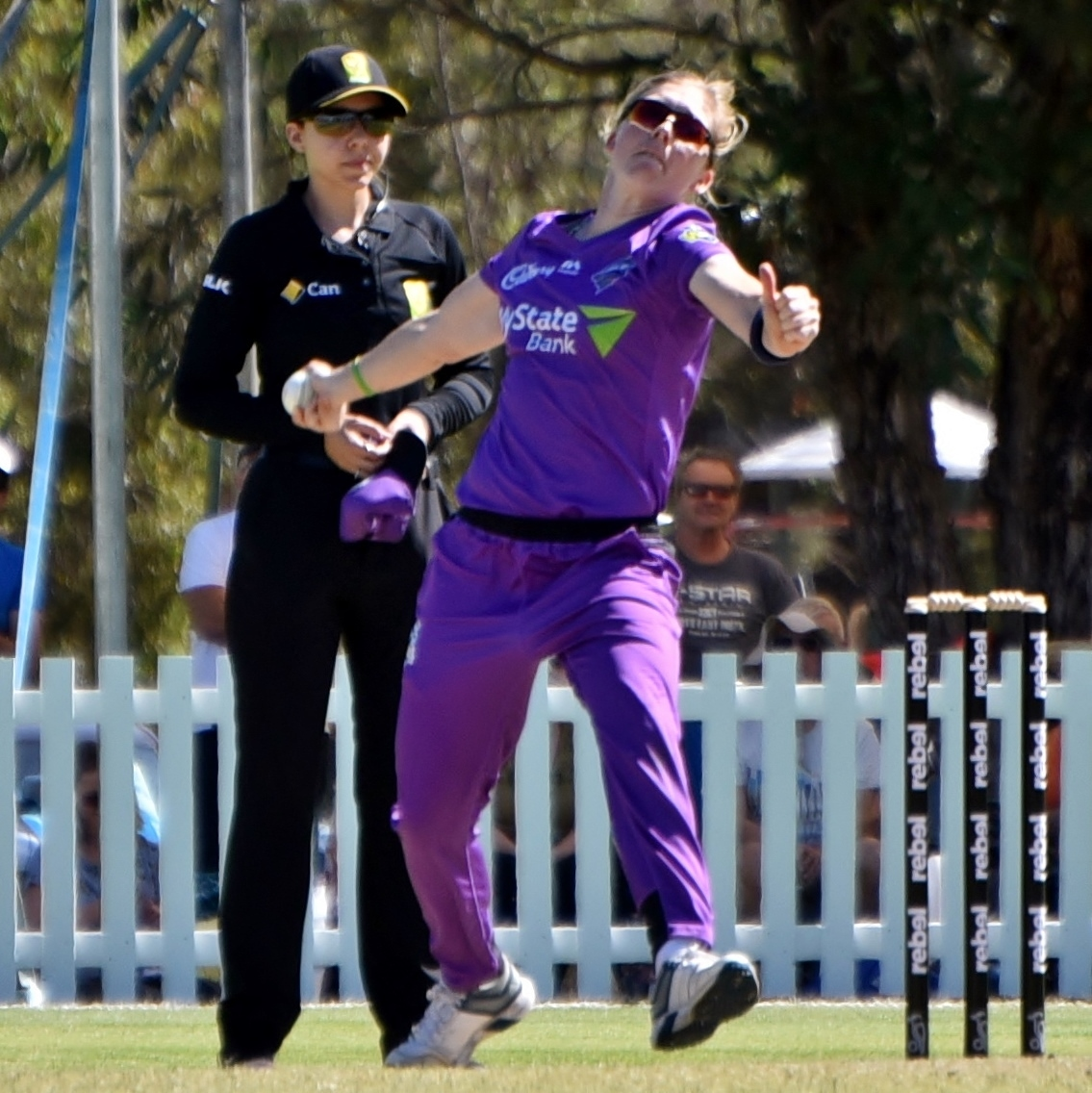
- Knight playing for Hobart Hurricanes in 2019

Personal information
- Full name: Heather Clare Knight
- Born: 26 December 1990 (age 35); Plymouth, England
- Nickname: Trev
- Batting: Right-handed
- Bowling: Right-arm off break
- Role: Batter

International information
- National side: England (2010–2026)
- Test debut (cap 149): 22 January 2011 v Australia
- Last Test: 10 July 2026 v India
- ODI debut (cap 115): 1 March 2010 v India
- Last ODI: 16 May 2026 v New Zealand
- ODI shirt no.: 5
- T20I debut (cap 29): 22 November 2010 v Sri Lanka
- Last T20I: 5 July 2026 v Australia
- T20I shirt no.: 5

Domestic team information
- Years: Team
- 2008–2009: Devon
- 2010–2019: Berkshire
- 2014/15–2015/16: Tasmania
- 2015/16–2019/20: Hobart Hurricanes
- 2016–2024: Western Storm
- 2020/21–2024/25: Sydney Thunder
- 2021–2025: London Spirit
- 2023: Royal Challengers Bengaluru
- 2025: Somerset (squad no. 5)

Career statistics
Competition	WTest	WODI	WT20I
Matches	15	160	145
Runs scored	989	4,372	2,656
Batting average	39.56	35.54	27.66
100s/50s	2/5	3/27	1/10
Top score	168*	109	108*
Balls bowled	419	1,923	585
Wickets	7	56	21
Bowling average	24.42	24.91	27.19
5 wickets in innings	0	1	0
10 wickets in match	0	0	0
Best bowling	2/7	5/26	3/9
Catches/stumpings	13/–	51/–	40/–
Medal record
Women's cricket
Representing England
ICC Cricket World Cup
Winner	2017 England & Wales	Team
Runner-up	2022 New Zealand	Teamz
T20 World Cup
Runner-up	2026 England
- Source: CricketArchive, 16 July 2026

Heather Clare Knight OBE (born 26 December 1990) is an English former cricketer and former captain of the England women's cricket team. She is a right-handed batter and right arm off spin bowler. Knight played in her 100th Women's One Day International match for England in December 2019.

== Early life ==
Knight was born on 26 December 1990 in Rochdale and was educated at Plymstock School, a state secondary school in Plymouth, Devon. She was offered a place at the University of Cambridge to study natural sciences, but turned it down so that she would have the time to play cricket. She went on to study Biomedical Sciences at Cardiff University.

== Domestic career ==
Knight played club cricket for Plymstock Cricket Club in the Devon Cricket League. She started attending colts training sessions at 8 years old and progressed through the club's youth system.

Knight is a prolific batter at county level, initially for her home county of Devon and currently for Berkshire. She topped the county run scoring aggregates in both 2008 (390 runs) and 2009 (622). She also played for the Diamonds, Sapphires and Emeralds in the Super Fours.

Knight captained Western Storm in the now-defunct Women's Cricket Super League, leading them to the title in 2017 and 2019. She was the competition's leading run-scorer across its four seasons. She continued to play for Western Storm in the Rachael Heyhoe Flint Trophy in 2020.

Knight has played domestically in Australia, previously for Tasmanian Roar and Hobart Hurricanes and currently for Sydney Thunder. She won the Women's Big Bash League in her first season with the Thunder, top-scoring with 26* in the final. In 2021, she was drafted by London Spirit for the inaugural season of The Hundred. In April 2022, she was bought by the London Spirit for the 2022 season of The Hundred.

In the inaugural season of the Women's Premier League in 2023, Knight was bought by Royal Challengers Bangalore (RCB) at the price of 40 Lakhs.

Knight joined Somerset in November 2024.

== International career ==
Knight was called into the England squad on their tour of India in 2010 as a replacement for the injured Sarah Taylor and played in the 5th One Day International on 1 March in Mumbai, opening the batting and scoring 49 on her international debut. She toured Sri Lanka with the England team in 2010, making her Twenty20 debut in the 2nd match of the series on 22 November in Colombo. She made her test debut in the one-off Ashes test at Sydney's Bankstown Oval in January 2011.

She is the holder of one of the first tranche of 18 ECB central contracts for women players, which were announced in April 2014.

On 5 June 2016, Knight was appointed captain of the England women's cricket team after Charlotte Edwards stood down.

She also became the first female cricketer to score a fifty and to take a five wicket haul in an ODI innings.

=== 2017 Women's Cricket World Cup ===
Heather Knight led the England team in her first Women's Cricket World Cup as captain, and they won the tournament despite losing to India in the opening match. In the second group match against Pakistan she, along with Natalie Sciver, went on to put on a record 3rd-wicket partnership in the history of Women's Cricket World Cup (213) as England managed to defeat Pakistan convincingly by 107 runs. In the final at Lord's Knight led England to a 9 run victory over India.

Following the team's success, she was awarded an OBE in the Queen's 2018 New Year Honours list.

In April 2018 she was named one of the five Wisden Cricketers of the Year for her part in the 2017 World Cup victory.

=== 2018 World Twenty20 and beyond ===
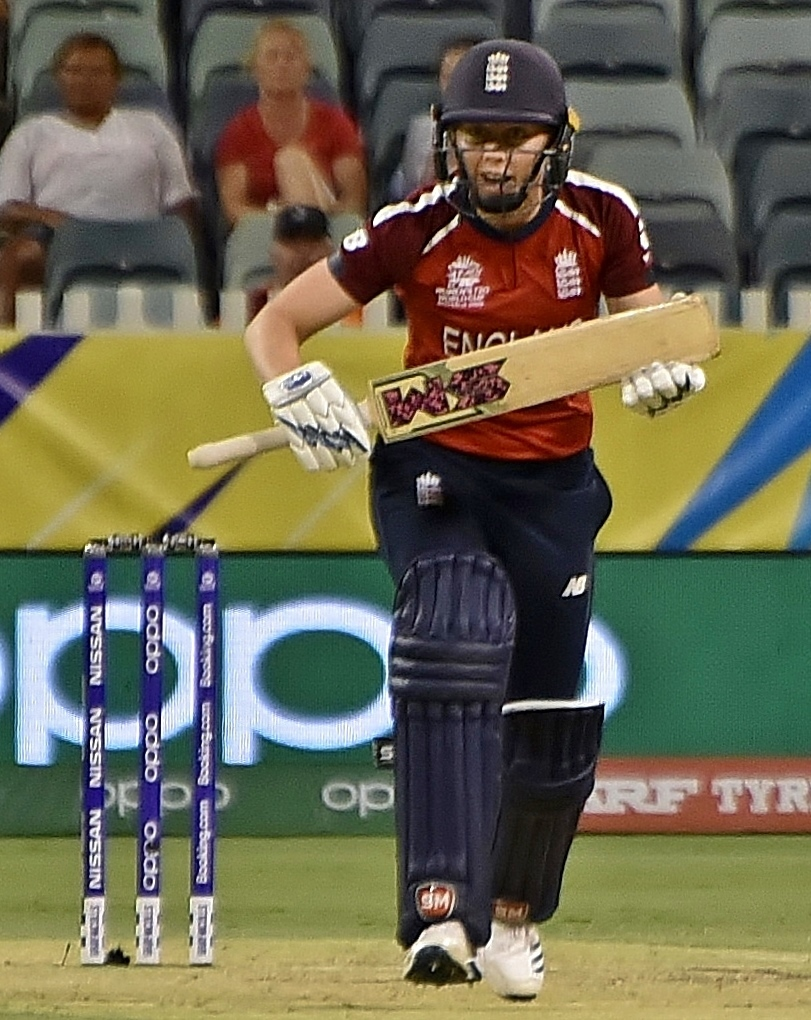
Knight batting for England during the 2020 ICC Women's T20 World Cup

In October 2018, she was named as the captain of England's squad for the 2018 ICC Women's World Twenty20 tournament in the West Indies.

In February 2019, she was awarded a full central contract by the England and Wales Cricket Board (ECB) for 2019. In June 2019, the ECB named her in England's squad for their opening match against Australia to contest the Women's Ashes.

On 12 December 2019, during England's series against Pakistan in Malaysia, Knight became the tenth woman for England to play in 100 WODI matches.

In January 2020, Knight was named as the captain of England's squad for the 2020 ICC Women's T20 World Cup in Australia. In England's second match of the tournament, against Thailand, Knight scored her 1,000th run in WT20Is. She also scored her first century in WT20I cricket, and became the first cricketer to score a century in all three formats of women's international cricket.

On 18 June 2020, Knight was named in a squad of 24 players to begin training ahead of international women's fixtures starting in England following the COVID-19 pandemic. In June 2021, Knight was named as the captain of England's Test squad for their one-off match against India. On 3 July 2021, in the home series against India, Knight scored her 3,000th run and took her 50th wicket in WODI cricket. In December 2021, Knight was named as the captain of England's squad for their tour to Australia to contest the Women's Ashes. In February 2022, she was named as the captain of England's team for the 2022 Women's Cricket World Cup in New Zealand. In July 2022, she was named as the captain of England's team for the cricket tournament at the 2022 Commonwealth Games in Birmingham, England.

She was named captain of the England squad for the 2024 ICC Women's T20 World Cup and for their multi-format tour to South Africa in November 2024.

In December 2024, Knight was named captain of the England squad for the 2025 Women's Ashes series in Australia.

On 22 March 2025, Knight was sacked as captain of England after almost nine years following a run of poor results including a whitewash defeat by Australia in an Ashes series earlier in the year.

In July 2026, she announced her retirement from international cricket, following the conclusion of the One-off Test against India at Lord's.

== International centuries ==
Knight was the first woman, and also the first England player, to score an international century in all three formats of the game. Her international centuries are listed below.

=== Test centuries ===
No.	Runs	Match	Opponents	Venue	Year
1	157	2	Australia	Sir Paul Getty's Ground, Wormsley, England	2013
2	168*	9	Australia	Manuka Oval, Canberra, Australia	2022

=== One Day International centuries ===
No.	Runs	Match	Opponents	Venue	Year
1	106	68	Pakistan	Grace Road, Leicester, England	2017
2	101	111	New Zealand	County Ground, Derby, England	2021
3	109	91	India	Holkar Stadium, Indore, India	2025

=== Twenty20 International centuries ===
No.	Runs	Match	Opponents	Venue	Year
1	108*	72	Thailand	Manuka Oval, Canberra, Australia	2020

== Personal life ==
Knight's nickname is "Trev". In 2015, she explained to sports journalist Clare Balding that "When I was about 13 and introduced myself at cricket camp, they thought I said Trevor rather than Heather!"

=== 2012 Blackface Incident ===
In September 2024, Knight admitted a disciplinary charge relating to wearing Blackface to a 2012 end of season fancy dress party for a club in Kent whilst she was playing for Berkshire and England. She was reprimanded by the Cricket Discipline Commission (CDC) and fined £1,000, which was suspended for two years. In its adjudication the CDC said it accepted there was no racist or discriminatory intent, but it reiterated that the photograph which led to the charge was "plainly prejudicial to the interests of cricket" and "brought the game and Ms Knight into disrepute."
