= Sneh Rana (cricketer) =

Indian cricketer

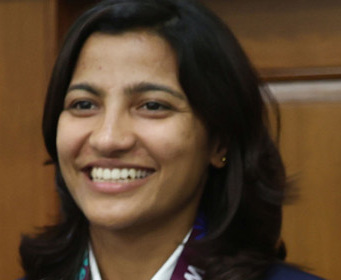
- Rana in 2025

Personal information
- Born: 18 February 1994 (age 32); Dehradun, Uttarakhand, India
- Batting: Right-handed
- Bowling: Right-arm off break
- Role: Bowling All-rounder

International information
- National side: India (2014–present)
- Test debut (cap 85): 16 June 2021 v England
- Last Test: 21 December 2023 v Australia
- ODI debut (cap 110): 19 January 2014 v Sri Lanka
- Last ODI: 2 November 2025 v South Africa
- ODI shirt no.: 36 (previously 2)
- T20I debut (cap 45): 26 January 2014 v Sri Lanka
- Last T20I: 9 July 2025 v England
- T20I shirt no.: 36 (previously 2)

Domestic team information
- Years: Team
- 2010/11–2017/18: Punjab
- 2015/16–present: Railways
- 2022: Velocity
- 2023–2024: Gujarat Giants
- 2025: Royal Challengers Bangalore
- 2026-Present: Delhi Capitals

Career statistics
Competition	WTest	WODI	WT20I
Matches	4	44	29
Runs scored	121	380	76
Batting average	30.25	16.52	12.66
100s/50s	0/1	0/1	0/0
Top score	80*	53*	16
Balls bowled	957	2,192	546
Wickets	23	57	24
Bowling average	20.95	31.24	24.41
5 wickets in innings	1	1	0
10 wickets in match	1	0	0
Best bowling	8/77	5/43	3/9
Catches/stumpings	2/–	19/–	12/–
Medal record
Women's cricket
Representing India
ICC Cricket World Cup
Winner	2025 India
Commonwealth Games
Silver medal – second place	2022 Birmingham
ACC Asia Cup
Winner	2022 Bangladesh
- Source: ESPNcricinfo, 17 November 2025

Sneh Rana (born 18 February 1994) is an Indian international cricketer. She plays for the women's national team as a right-arm off break bowler and a right-handed batter. Rana represents Railways in domestic cricket and Delhi Capitals in the Women's Premier League. She was part of the Indian team that won the 2025 Women's Cricket World Cup and 2022 Women's Asia Cup.

== Early life ==
Rana hails from Sinaula, on the outskirts of Dehradun. Her father was a farmer.

== International career ==
She made her Women's One Day International and Women's Twenty20 International debuts against Sri Lanka in 2014.

After a knee injury in 2016, she was sidelined from the national team, and would not play international cricket for another five years. During this period, she played domestic cricket, and also played for India B.

In May 2021, she was named in India's Test squad for their one-off match against the England women's cricket team. Rana made her Test debut against England on 16 June 2021.

In January 2022, she was named in India's team for the 2022 Women's Cricket World Cup in New Zealand. In July 2022, she was named in India's team for the cricket tournament at the 2022 Commonwealth Games in Birmingham, England.

During the one-off Test against South Africa Women at Chepauk in 2024, Rana took maiden five-wicket haul and became the second woman spinner and first from India to take a ten-wicket haul in Test cricket.

Rana took her first five-wicket haul in ODIs against South Africa during the Tri-Series on 29 April 2025.
