= 2022–23 Senior Women's T20 Challenger Trophy =

- Dates: 20 – 26 November 2022
- Administrator(s): BCCI
- Cricket format: Twenty20
- Tournament format(s): Round-robin and final
- Champions: India D (1st title)
- Runners-up: India A
- Participants: 4
- Matches: 7
- Most runs: Yastika Bhatia (203)
- Most wickets: Renuka Singh (8)

The 2022–23 Senior Women's T20 Challenger Trophy was the fourth edition of India's Senior Women's T20 Challenger Trophy. Four teams, India A, India B, India C and India D, competed in the tournament. The tournament took place between 20 and 26 November 2022. It was the first T20 Challenger Trophy to take place since 2019–20. The tournament was won by India D, who beat India A by 7 wickets in the final.

== Competition format ==
The four teams played in a round-robin group, playing each other team once, with the top two advancing to the final. Matches were played using a Twenty20 format. All matches were played at the Shaheed Veer Narayan Singh International Cricket Stadium, Naya Raipur.

The group worked on a points system with positions with the group being based on the total points. Points were awarded as follows:

Win: 4 points.
Tie: 2 points.
Loss: 0 points.
No Result/Abandoned: 2 points.

If points in the final table were equal, teams were separated by most wins, then head-to-head record, then Net Run Rate.

== Squads ==
India A	India B	India C	India D
Poonam Yadav (c); Sundaresan Anusha; Harleen Deol; Saika Ishaque; Disha Kasat; Amanjot Kaur; Muskan Malik; Nuzhat Parween (wk); Shreyanka Patil; Sahana Pawar; Sajeevan Sajana; Anjali Sarvani; Shivali Shinde (wk); Meghna Singh	Deepti Sharma (c); Simran Bahadur; Taniya Bhatia (wk); Nishu Chaudhary; Dhara Gujjar; Solal Kalal; Yuvashri Karthikeyan; Humaira Kazi; Suman Meena; Monica Patel; Arundhati Reddy; Devika Vaidya; Shafali Verma; Laxmi Yadav (wk)	Pooja Vastrakar (c); Saranya Gadwal; Richa Ghosh (wk); Keerthy James; Rashi Kanojiya; Madiwala Mamatha (wk); Sabbhineni Meghana; Kiran Navgire; Tarannum Pathan; Priya Punia; Ajima Sangma; Simran Shaikh; Anjali Singh; Komal Zanzad	Sneh Rana (c); Kanika Ahuja; Jasia Akhtar; Yastika Bhatia (wk); Rajeshwari Gayakwad; Dayalan Hemalatha; Ashwani Kumari; Aparna Mondal (wk); Shikha Pandey; Shraddha Pokharkar; Priyanka Priyadarshini; Jemimah Rodrigues; Renuka Singh; Sushma Verma (wk)

Source: BCCI

== Group stage ==
=== Points table ===
Team	Pld	W	L	T	NR	Pts	NRR
India D (Q)	3	2	1	0	0	8	+1.678
India A (Q)	3	2	1	0	0	8	+0.146
India B	3	2	1	0	0	8	–0.372
India C	3	0	3	0	0	0	–1.388

Source: BCCI

=== Fixtures ===
20 November 2022
Scorecard

India A 160/2 (20 overs)	v	India C 126/8 (20 overs)
Nuzhat Parween 55 (54); Rashi Kanojiya 1/25 (3 overs)		Pooja Vastrakar 61 (38); Sahana Pawar 3/14 (4 overs)

India A won by 34 runs
Shaheed Veer Narayan Singh International Cricket Stadium, Naya Raipur
Umpires: Soshan Soma and K Nidhin

- India A won the toss and elected to bat.

20 November 2022
Scorecard

India B 80 (18.2 overs)	v	India D 81/0 (10.2 overs)
Deepti Sharma 21 (20); Rajeshwari Gayakwad 3/11 (3.2 overs)		Jasia Akhtar 56* (36)

India D won by 10 wickets
Shaheed Veer Narayan Singh International Cricket Stadium, Naya Raipur
Umpires: Soshan Soma and K Nidhin

- India D won the toss and elected to field.

22 November 2022
Scorecard

India A 110 (20 overs)	v	India B 114/1 (14.1 overs)
Amanjot Kaur 49 (49); Deepti Sharma 4/15 (4 overs)		Shafali Verma 91* (52); Shreyanka Patil 1/22 (3 overs)

India B won by 9 wickets
Shaheed Veer Narayan Singh International Cricket Stadium, Naya Raipur
Umpires: Soshan Soma and K Nidhin

- India A won the toss and elected to bat.

22 November 2022
Scorecard

India D 165/5 (20 overs)	v	India C 118/7 (20 overs)
Yastika Bhatia 99* (61); Pooja Vastrakar 1/19 (2 overs)		Richa Ghosh 36 (30); Renuka Singh 3/27 (4 overs)

India D won by 47 runs
Shaheed Veer Narayan Singh International Cricket Stadium, Naya Raipur
Umpires: Soshan Soma and K Nidhin

- India D won the toss and elected to bat.

24 November 2022
Scorecard

India D 92 (19.4 overs)	v	India A 95/3 (18.1 overs)
Ashwani Kumari 31 (27); Amanjot Kaur 2/7 (2 overs)		Shivali Shinde 27 (30); Rajeshwari Gayakwad 1/13 (4 overs)

India A won by 7 wickets
Shaheed Veer Narayan Singh International Cricket Stadium, Naya Raipur
Umpires: Soshan Soma and K Nidhin

- India A won the toss and elected to field.

24 November 2022
Scorecard

India C 140/6 (20 overs)	v	India B 141/6 (19.5 overs)
Simran Shaikh 32 (24); Arundhati Reddy 3/28 (4 overs)		Devika Vaidya 41* (27); Komal Zanzad 2/17 (4 overs)

India B won by 4 wickets
Shaheed Veer Narayan Singh International Cricket Stadium, Naya Raipur
Umpires: Soshan Soma and K Nidhin

- India C won the toss and elected to bat.

=== Final ===
26 November 2022
Scorecard

India A 144/5 (20 overs)	v	India D 148/3 (19 overs)
Harleen Deol 61 (48); Renuka Singh 3/24 (4 overs)		Yastika Bhatia 80* (56); Poonam Yadav 1/25 (4 overs)

India D won by 7 wickets
Shaheed Veer Narayan Singh International Cricket Stadium, Naya Raipur
Umpires: Soshan Soma and K Nidhin

- India D won the toss and elected to field.

== Statistics ==
=== Most runs ===
Player	Team	Matches	Innings	Runs	Average	HS	100s	50s
Yastika Bhatia	India D	4	4	203	203.00	99*	0	2
Nuzhat Parween	India A	4	4	130	32.50	55	0	2
Harleen Deol	India A	4	4	124	41.33	61	0	2
Jasia Akhtar	India D	4	4	114	38.00	56*	0	1
Shafali Verma	India B	3	3	103	51.50	91*	0	1

Source: BCCI

=== Most wickets ===
Player	Team	Overs	Wickets	Average	5w
Renuka Singh	India D	12.0	8	9.37	0
Deepti Sharma	India B	10.0	7	9.57	0
Rajeshwari Gayakwad	India D	14.2	6	10.16	0
Sahana Pawar	India A	14.0	5	15.40	0
Arundhati Reddy	India B	6.0	3	12.33	0

Source: BCCI
