= List of 2027 Women's Premier League auctions and personnel signings =

2027 Women's Premier League Player Auction

General information
- Sport: Cricket
- Date: 28 October 2026
- Time: 14:00 IST
- Location: Kochi, India

Overview
- 25 total selections
- League: Women's Premier League
- Team: 5

This is a list of auction and personnel signings for the 2027 Women's Premier League cricket tournament, held in India, and organised by the Board of Control for Cricket in India.

== Retained players ==
The retained players were announced on 28 September 2026.

Delhi Capitals	Gujarat Giants	Mumbai Indians	Royal Challengers Bangalore	UP Warriorz
Jemimah Rodrigues (c); Shree Charani; Lucy Hamilton; Chinelle Henry; Marizanne Kapp; Mamatha Madiwala; Minnu Mani; Niki Prasad; Nandani Sharma; Annabel Sutherland; Shafali Verma; Laura Wolvaardt; Deeya Yadav	Ashleigh Gardner (c); Kanika Ahuja; Yastika Bhatia; Sophie Devine; Bharti Fulmali; Kim Garth; Kashvee Gautam; Rajeshwari Gayakwad; Jintimani Kalita; Tanuja Kanwar; Happy Kumari; Beth Mooney; Anushka Sharma; Renuka Singh; Georgia Wareham	Harmanpreet Kaur (c); Nicola Carey; Rahila Firdous; Sanskriti Gupta; Shabnim Ismail; Amanjot Kaur; Amelia Kerr; Hayley Matthews; Tara Norris (Note: Traded from UP Warriorz); Sajeevan Sajana; Nat Sciver-Brunt; Vaishnavi Sharma	Smriti Mandhana (c); Lauren Bell; Richa Ghosh; Nadine de Klerk; Prathyoosha Kumar; Shreyanka Patil; Ellyse Perry; Prema Rawat; Arundhati Reddy; Sayali Satghare; Pooja Vastrakar; Georgia Voll; Radha Yadav	Meg Lanning (c); Harleen Deol; Sophie Ecclestone; Kranti Gaud; Shipra Giri; Phoebe Litchfield; Shikha Pandey; Pratika Rawal; Simran Shaikh; Deepti Sharma

== Player auction ==
A total of 146 players (119 Indian and 27 overseas) entered the auction pool, with only 27 open places (20 Indian and 7 overseas slot).

=== Auction results ===
Name	Playing role	National team	Base price (₹ lakhs)	Team	Auctioned price (₹ lakhs)	Notes
Sophie Molineux	All-rounder	Australia	50	UP Warriorz	110	
Kiran Navgire	Batsman	India	40	Delhi Capitals	75	
G Kamalini	Batsman	India	40	Gujarat Giants	40	
Jess Jonassen	All-rounder	Australia	40	Royal Challengers Bengaluru	40	
Orla Prendergast	All-rounder	Ireland	30	Gujarat Giants	30	
Sneh Rana	All-rounder	India	30	UP Warriorz	30	
Grace Harris	All-rounder	Australia	30	UP Warriorz	30	
Sushma Verma	Wicket keeper	India	30	UP Warriorz	30	
Chloe Tryon	All-rounder	South Africa	30	Royal Challengers Bengaluru	30	
Disha Kasat	Batsman	India	10	Mumbai Indians	10	
Latika Inamdar	Wicket keeper	India	10	Mumbai Indians	10	
Bharti Rawal	Spin bowler	India	10	Mumbai Indians	10	

== Support staff changes ==
Support staff changes for the 2027 Women's Premier League
Team	Position	Outgoing	Incoming	Ref.
Mumbai Indians	Head coach	Lisa Keightley	Luke Williams	
