= 2023 Women's Premier League (cricket) =

Cricket tournament

- Dates: 4 – 26 March 2023
- Administrator: Board of Control for Cricket in India
- Cricket format: Twenty20 cricket
- Tournament format(s): Double Round robin and playoffs
- Champions: Mumbai Indians (1st title)
- Runners-up: Delhi Capitals
- Participants: 5
- Matches: 22
- Player of the series: (Cricket West Indies) Hayley Matthews (Mumbai Indians)
- Most runs: (Australia) Meg Lanning (Delhi Capitals) (345)
- Most wickets: (Cricket West Indies) Hayley Matthews (Mumbai Indians) (16)
- Official website: wplt20.com

The 2023 Women's Premier League, (also known as WPL 2023 and branded as TATA WPL 2023) was the inaugural season of the Women's Premier League, a women's franchise Twenty20 cricket league organised by the Board of Control for Cricket in India (BCCI). The tournament featured five teams and was held from 4 March to 26 March 2023.

In the final, Mumbai Indians defeated Delhi Capitals to win the competition.

== Background ==
The prize money for the season was ₹10 crore (US$1.2 million). Tickets for matches were free to women during the first season. The opening ceremony took place on 4 March at DY Patil Stadium in Navi Mumbai, with AP Dhillon, Kriti Sanon and Kiara Advani performing.

Starting this season, both teams could use the Decision Review System to challenge no-ball and wide ball calls. The rule was implemented in the 2023 IPL season.

== Teams ==
Delhi Capitals	Gujarat Giants	Mumbai Indians	Royal Challengers Bangalore	UP Warriorz
Meg Lanning (c); Jemimah Rodrigues (vc); Shafali Verma; Radha Yadav; Shikha Pandey; Marizanne Kapp; Titas Sadhu; Alice Capsey; Tara Norris; Laura Harris; Jasia Akhtar; Minnu Mani; Taniya Bhatia (wk); Jess Jonassen; Sneha Deepthi; Poonam Yadav; Aparna Mondal; Arundhati Reddy; Coach: Jonathan Batty	Beth Mooney (c); Sneh Rana (vc); Ashleigh Gardner; Sophia Dunkley; Annabel Sutherland; Harleen Deol; ~~Deandra Dottin~~; Kim Garth; Sabbhineni Meghana; Georgia Wareham; Mansi Joshi; Dayalan Hemalatha; Laura Wolvaardt; Tanuja Kanwar; Monica Patel; Sushma Verma; Hurley Gala; Ashwani Kumari; Parunika Sisodia; Shabnam Shakil; Coach: Rachael Haynes	Harmanpreet Kaur (c); Nat Sciver-Brunt (vc); Amelia Kerr; Pooja Vastrakar; Yastika Bhatia; Heather Graham; Issy Wong; Amanjot Kaur; Dhara Gujjar; Saika Ishaque; Hayley Matthews; Chloe Tryon; Humaira Kazi; Priyanka Bala; Sonam Yadav; Jintimani Kalita; Neelam Bisht; Coach: Charlotte Edwards	Smriti Mandhana (c); Sophie Devine (vc); Ellyse Perry; Renuka Singh; Richa Ghosh (wk); Erin Burns; Disha Kasat; Indrani Roy; Shreyanka Patil; Kanika Ahuja; Asha Shobana; Heather Knight; Dane van Niekerk; Preeti Bose; Poonam Khemnar; Komal Zanzad; Megan Schutt; Sahana Pawar; Coach: Ben Sawyer	Alyssa Healy (c); Deepti Sharma (vc); Sophie Ecclestone; Tahlia McGrath; Shabnim Ismail; Anjali Sarvani; Rajeshwari Gayakwad; Parshavi Chopra; Shweta Sehrawat; Soppadhandi Yashasri; Kiran Navgire; Grace Harris; Devika Vaidya; Lauren Bell; ~~Laxmi Yadav~~; Simran Shaikh; Shivali Shinde; Coach: Jon Lewis

=== 2023 WPL player auction ===
Below is a list of the players sold during the WPL auction (prices are in Indian rupees). A total of 87 players were sold during the auction, 30 of whom were from overseas.

Name	National team	Team	Price
Smriti Mandhana	India	Royal Challengers Bangalore	₹3.4 crore (US$400,000)
Harmanpreet Kaur	India	Mumbai Indians	₹1.8 crore (US$210,000)
Sophie Devine	New Zealand	Royal Challengers Bangalore	₹50 lakh (US$59,000)
Ashleigh Gardner	Australia	Gujarat Giants	₹3.2 crore (US$380,000)
Ellyse Perry	Australia	Royal Challengers Bangalore	₹1.7 crore (US$200,000)
Sophie Ecclestone	England	UP Warriorz	₹1.8 crore (US$210,000)
Deepti Sharma	India	UP Warriorz	₹2.6 crore (US$310,000)
Renuka Singh	India	Royal Challengers Bangalore	₹1.5 crore (US$180,000)
Nat Sciver-Brunt	England	Mumbai Indians	₹3.2 crore (US$380,000)
Tahlia McGrath	Australia	UP Warriorz	₹1.4 crore (US$170,000)
Beth Mooney	Australia	Gujarat Giants	₹2 crore (US$240,000)
Shabnim Ismail	South Africa	UP Warriorz	₹1 crore (US$120,000)
Amelia Kerr	New Zealand	Mumbai Indians	₹1 crore (US$120,000)
Sophia Dunkley	England	Gujarat Giants	₹60 lakh (US$71,000)
Jemimah Rodrigues	India	Delhi Capitals	₹2.2 crore (US$260,000)
Meg Lanning	Australia	Delhi Capitals	₹1.1 crore (US$130,000)
Shafali Verma	India	Delhi Capitals	₹2 crore (US$240,000)
Annabel Sutherland	Australia	Gujarat Giants	₹70 lakh (US$83,000)
Harleen Deol	India	Gujarat Giants	₹40 lakh (US$47,000)
Pooja Vastrakar	India	Mumbai Indians	₹1.9 crore (US$220,000)
Deandra Dottin	West Indies	Gujarat Giants	₹60 lakh (US$71,000)
Yastika Bhatia	India	Mumbai Indians	₹1.5 crore (US$180,000)
Richa Ghosh	India	Royal Challengers Bangalore	₹1.9 crore (US$220,000)
Alyssa Healy	Australia	UP Warriorz	₹70 lakh (US$83,000)
Anjali Sarvani	India	UP Warriorz	₹55 lakh (US$65,000)
Rajeshwari Gayakwad	India	UP Warriorz	₹40 lakh (US$47,000)
Radha Yadav	India	Delhi Capitals	₹40 lakh (US$47,000)
Shikha Pandey	India	Delhi Capitals	₹60 lakh (US$71,000)
Sneh Rana	India	Gujarat Giants	₹75 lakh (US$89,000)
Marizanne Kapp	South Africa	Delhi Capitals	₹1.5 crore (US$180,000)
Parshavi Chopra	India	UP Warriorz	₹10 lakh (US$12,000)
Titas Sadhu	India	Delhi Capitals	₹25 lakh (US$30,000)
Shweta Sehrawat	India	UP Warriorz	₹40 lakh (US$47,000)
Soppadhandi Yashasri	India	UP Warriorz	₹10 lakh (US$12,000)
Kiran Navgire	India	UP Warriorz	₹30 lakh (US$35,000)
Sabbineni Meghana	India	Gujarat Giants	₹30 lakh (US$35,000)
Erin Burns	Australia	Royal Challengers Bangalore	₹30 lakh (US$35,000)
Heather Graham	Australia	Mumbai Indians	₹30 lakh (US$35,000)
Grace Harris	Australia	UP Warriorz	₹75 lakh (US$89,000)
Georgia Wareham	Australia	Gujarat Giants	₹75 lakh (US$89,000)
Alice Capsey	England	Delhi Capitals	₹75 lakh (US$89,000)
Issy Wong	England	Mumbai Indians	₹30 lakh (US$35,000)
Mansi Joshi	India	Gujarat Giants	₹30 lakh (US$35,000)
Devika Vaidya	India	UP Warriorz	₹1.4 crore (US$170,000)
Amanjot Kaur	India	Mumbai Indians	₹50 lakh (US$59,000)
Dayalan Hemalatha	India	Gujarat Giants	₹30 lakh (US$35,000)
Lauren Bell	England	UP Warriorz	₹30 lakh (US$35,000)
Monica Patel	India	Gujarat Giants	₹30 lakh (US$35,000)
Tara Norris	United States	Delhi Capitals	₹10 lakh (US$12,000)
Laura Harris	Australia	Delhi Capitals	₹45 lakh (US$53,000)
Dhara Gujjar	India	Mumbai Indians	₹10 lakh (US$12,000)
Jasia Akhter	India	Delhi Capitals	₹20 lakh (US$24,000)
Disha Kasat	India	Royal Challengers Bangalore	₹10 lakh (US$12,000)
Laxmi Yadav	India	UP Warriorz	₹10 lakh (US$12,000)
Indrani Roy	India	Royal Challengers Bangalore	₹10 lakh (US$12,000)
Minnu Mani	India	Delhi Capitals	₹30 lakh (US$35,000)
Shreyanka Patil	India	Royal Challengers Bangalore	₹10 lakh (US$12,000)
Kanika Ahuja	India	Royal Challengers Bangalore	₹35 lakh (US$41,000)
Tanuja Kanwar	India	Gujarat Giants	₹50 lakh (US$59,000)
Saika Ishaque	India	Mumbai Indians	₹10 lakh (US$12,000)
Asha Shobana	India	Royal Challengers Bangalore	₹10 lakh (US$12,000)
Hayley Matthews	West Indies	Mumbai Indians	₹40 lakh (US$47,000)
Heather Knight	England	Royal Challengers Bangalore	₹40 lakh (US$47,000)
Taniya Bhatia	India	Delhi Capitals	₹30 lakh (US$35,000)
Sushma Verma	India	Gujarat Giants	₹60 lakh (US$71,000)
Poonam Yadav	India	Delhi Capitals	₹30 lakh (US$35,000)
Jess Jonassen	Australia	Delhi Capitals	₹50 lakh (US$59,000)
Hurley Gala	India	Gujarat Giants	₹10 lakh (US$12,000)
Sneha Deepthi	India	Delhi Capitals	₹30 lakh (US$35,000)
Arundhati Reddy	India	Delhi Capitals	₹30 lakh (US$35,000)
Chloe Tyron	South Africa	Mumbai Indians	₹30 lakh (US$35,000)
Dane van Niekerk	South Africa	Royal Challengers Bangalore	₹30 lakh (US$35,000)
Preeti Bose	India	Royal Challengers Bangalore	₹30 lakh (US$35,000)
Simran Shaikh	India	UP Warriorz	₹10 lakh (US$12,000)
Aparna Mondal	India	Delhi Capitals	₹10 lakh (US$12,000)
Ashwani Kumari	India	Gujarat Giants	₹35 lakh (US$41,000)
Humaira Kazi	India	Mumbai Indians	₹10 lakh (US$12,000)
Poonam Khemnar	India	Royal Challengers Bangalore	₹10 lakh (US$12,000)
Komal Zanzad	India	Royal Challengers Bangalore	₹25 lakh (US$30,000)
Parunika Sisodia	India	Gujarat Giants	₹10 lakh (US$12,000)
Priyanka Bala	India	Mumbai Indians	₹20 lakh (US$24,000)
Megan Schutt	Australia	Royal Challengers Bangalore	₹40 lakh (US$47,000)
Shabnam Shakil	India	Gujarat Giants	₹10 lakh (US$12,000)
Sonam Yadav	India	Mumbai Indians	₹10 lakh (US$12,000)
Jintimani Kalita	India	Mumbai Indians	₹10 lakh (US$12,000)
Neelam Bisht	India	Mumbai Indians	₹10 lakh (US$12,000)
Sahana Pawar	India	Royal Challengers Bangalore	₹10 lakh (US$12,000)

== Venues ==
Matches were played at the Brabourne Stadium in Mumbai and DY Patil Stadium in Navi Mumbai, with the latter hosting the final. Attendances were between 9,000 and 13,000 on average, with some matches reaching 30,000 and the final was a sellout.

Mumbai	2023 Women's Premier League (cricket) is located in India	Navi Mumbai
Brabourne Stadium	2023 Women's Premier League (cricket) is located in India	DY Patil Stadium
Capacity: 33,000	2023 Women's Premier League (cricket) is located in India	Capacity: 55,300

== League stage ==
=== Points table ===
Pos	Team	Pld	W	L	NR	Pts	NRR	
1	Delhi Capitals (R)	8	6	2	0	12	1.856	Advanced to the Final
2	Mumbai Indians (C)	8	6	2	0	12	1.711	Advanced to the Eliminator
3	UP Warriorz (3rd)	8	4	4	0	8	0.200	Advanced to the Eliminator
4	Royal Challengers Bangalore	8	2	6	0	4	−1.137	
5	Gujarat Giants	8	2	6	0	4	−2.220	

Source: ESPNcricinfo
(C) Champions; (R) Runners-up

=== Match summary ===
Team	Group matches								Playoffs	
Team	1	2	3	4	5	6	7	8	E	F
Delhi Capitals	2	4	4	6	8	8	10	12		L
Gujarat Giants	0	0	2	2	2	4	4	4		
Mumbai Indians	2	4	6	8	10	10	10	12	W	W
Royal Challengers Bengaluru	0	0	0	0	0	2	4	4		
UP Warriorz	2	2	4	4	4	6	8	8	L	

Win	Loss	No result

- Note: The total points at the end of each group match are listed.
- Note: Click on the points (group matches) or W/L (playoffs) to see the match summary.

Visitor team →	DC	GG	MI	RCB	UPW
Home team ↓	DC	GG	MI	RCB	UPW
Delhi Capitals		Gujarat; 11 runs	Mumbai; 8 wickets	Delhi; 6 wickets	Delhi; 42 runs
Gujarat Giants	Delhi; 10 wickets		Mumbai; 143 runs	Gujarat; 11 runs	Lucknow; 3 wickets
Mumbai Indians	Delhi; 9 wickets	Mumbai; 55 runs		Mumbai; 9 wickets	Lucknow; 5 wickets
Royal Challengers Bengaluru	Delhi; 60 runs	Bengaluru; 8 wickets	Mumbai; 4 wickets		Lucknow; 10 wickets
UP Warriorz	Delhi; 5 wickets	Lucknow; 3 wickets	Mumbai; 8 wickets	Bengaluru; 5 wickets	

Home team won	Visitor team won

- Note: Results listed are according to the home (horizontal) and visitor (vertical) teams.
- Note: Click on a result to see a summary of the match.

=== Fixtures ===
The BCCI released the fixture details on 14 February 2023.

Match 1
4 March 2023
20:00 (N)
Scorecard

Mumbai Indians; 207/5 (20 overs)	v	Gujarat Giants; 64 (15.1 overs)
Harmanpreet Kaur 65 (30); Sneh Rana 2/43 (4 overs)		Dayalan Hemalatha 29* (23); Saika Ishaque 4/11 (3.1 overs)

Mumbai Indians won by 143 runs
DY Patil Stadium, Mumbai
Umpires: Nitin Pandit and Vrinda Rathi
Player of the match: Harmanpreet Kaur (Mumbai Indians)

- Gujarat Giants won the toss and elected to field.
- The match was originally scheduled to start at 19:30, but it was rescheduled due to the opening ceremony.

Match 2
5 March 2023
15:30 (D/N)
Scorecard

Delhi Capitals; 223/2 (20 overs)	v	Royal Challengers Bangalore; 163/8 (20 overs)
Shafali Verma 84 (45); Heather Knight 2/40 (3 overs)		Smriti Mandhana 35 (23); Tara Norris 5/29 (4 overs)

Delhi Capitals won by 60 runs
Brabourne Stadium, Mumbai
Umpires: Narayanan Janani and Chirra Ravikanthreddy
Player of the match: Tara Norris (Delhi Capitals)

- Royal Challengers Bangalore won the toss and elected to field.

Match 3
5 March 2023
19:30 (N)
Scorecard

Gujarat Giants; 169/6 (20 overs)	v	UP Warriorz; 175/7 (19.5 overs)
Harleen Deol 46 (32); Sophie Ecclestone 2/25 (4 overs)		Grace Harris 59* (26); Kim Garth 5/36 (4 overs)

UP Warriorz won by 3 wickets
DY Patil Stadium, Mumbai
Umpires: Sanjay Kumar Singh and Gayathri Venugopalan
Player of the match: Grace Harris (UP Warriorz)

- Gujarat Giants won the toss and elected to bat.

Match 4
6 March 2023
19:30 (N)
Scorecard

Royal Challengers Bangalore; 155 (18.4 overs)	v	Mumbai Indians; 159/1 (14.2 overs)
Richa Ghosh 28 (26); Hayley Matthews 3/28 (4 overs)		Hayley Matthews 77* (38); Preeti Bose 1/34 (4 overs)

Mumbai Indians won by 9 wickets
Brabourne Stadium, Mumbai
Umpires: Pashchim Pathak and Ranjeev Sharma
Player of the match: Hayley Matthews (Mumbai Indians)

- Royal Challengers Bangalore won the toss and elected to bat.

Match 5
7 March 2023
19:30 (N)
Scorecard

Delhi Capitals; 211/4 (20 overs)	v	UP Warriorz; 169/5 (20 overs)
Meg Lanning 70 (42); Shabnim Ismail 1/29 (4 overs)		Tahlia McGrath 90* (50); Jess Jonassen 3/43 (4 overs)

Delhi Capitals won by 42 runs
DY Patil Stadium, Mumbai
Umpires: Vrinda Rathi and Chirra Ravikanthreddy
Player of the match: Jess Jonassen (Delhi Capitals)

- UP Warriorz won the toss and elected to field.

Match 6
8 March 2023
19:30 (N)
Scorecard

Gujarat Giants; 201/7 (20 overs)	v	Royal Challengers Bangalore; 190/6 (20 overs)
Harleen Deol 67 (45); Heather Knight 2/17 (2 overs)		Sophie Devine 66 (45); Ashleigh Gardner 3/31 (4 overs)

Gujarat Giants won by 11 runs
Brabourne Stadium, Mumbai
Umpires: Sanjay Kumar Singh and Ranjeev Sharma
Player of the match: Sophia Dunkley (Gujarat Giants)

- Gujarat Giants won the toss and elected to bat.

Match 7
9 March 2023
19:30 (N)
Scorecard

Delhi Capitals; 105 (18 overs)	v	Mumbai Indians; 109/2 (15 overs)
Meg Lanning 43 (41); Issy Wong 3/10 (4 overs)		Yastika Bhatia 41 (32); Tara Norris 1/4 (1 over)

Mumbai Indians win by 8 wickets
DY Patil Stadium, Mumbai
Umpires: Madanagopal Kuppuraj and Vrinda Rathi
Player of the match: Saika Ishaque (Mumbai Indians)

- Delhi Capitals won the toss and elected to bat.

Match 8
10 March 2023
19:30 (N)
Scorecard

Royal Challengers Bangalore; 138 (19.3 overs)	v	UP Warriorz; 139/0 (13 overs)
Ellyse Perry 52 (39); Sophie Ecclestone 4/13 (3.3 overs)		Alyssa Healy 96* (47)

UP Warriorz won by 10 wickets
Brabourne Stadium, Mumbai
Umpires: Saurabh Dhote and Narayanan Janani
Player of the match: Alyssa Healy (UP Warriorz)

- Royal Challengers Bangalore won the toss and elected to bat.

Match 9
11 March 2023
19:30 (N)
Scorecard

Gujarat Giants; 105/9 (20 overs)	v	Delhi Capitals; 107/0 (7.1 overs)
Kim Garth 32* (37); Marizanne Kapp 5/15 (4 overs)		Shafali Verma 76* (28)

Delhi Capitals won by 10 wickets
DY Patil Stadium, Mumbai
Umpires: Sanjay Kumar Singh and Gayathri Venugopalan
Player of the match: Marizanne Kapp (Delhi Capitals)

- Gujarat Giants won the toss and elected to bat.

Match 10
12 March 2023
19:30 (N)
Scorecard

UP Warriorz; 159/6 (20 overs)	v	Mumbai Indians; 164/2 (17.3 overs)
Alyssa Healy 58 (46); Saika Ishaque 3/33 (4 overs)		Harmanpreet Kaur 53* (33); Sophie Ecclestone 1/30 (4 overs)

Mumbai Indians won by 8 wickets
Brabourne Stadium, Mumbai
Umpires: Narayanan Janani and Pashchim Pathak
Player of the match: Harmanpreet Kaur (Mumbai Indians)

- UP Warriorz won the toss and elected to bat.

Match 11
13 March 2023
19:30 (N)
Scorecard

Royal Challengers Bangalore; 150/4 (20 overs)	v	Delhi Capitals; 154/4 (19.4 overs)
Ellyse Perry 67* (52); Shikha Pandey 3/23 (4 overs)		Alice Capsey 38 (24); Asha Shobana 2/27 (4 overs)

Delhi Capitals won by 6 wickets
DY Patil Stadium, Mumbai
Umpires: Saurabh Dhote and Nitin Pandit
Player of the match: Jess Jonassen (Delhi Capitals)

- Delhi Capitals won the toss and elected to field.

Match 12
14 March 2023
19:30 (N)
Scorecard

Mumbai Indians; 162/8 (20 overs)	v	Gujarat Giants; 107/9 (20 overs)
Harmanpreet Kaur 51 (30); Ashleigh Gardner 3/34 (4 overs)		Harleen Deol 22 (23); Nat Sciver-Brunt 3/21 (4 overs)

Mumbai Indians won by 55 runs
Brabourne Stadium, Mumbai
Umpires: Chirra Ravikanthreddy and Gayathri Venugopalan
Player of the match: Harmanpreet Kaur (Mumbai Indians)

- Gujarat Giants won the toss and elected to field.
- Mumbai Indians qualified for the playoffs as a result of this match.

Match 13
15 March 2023
19:30 (N)
Scorecard

UP Warriorz; 135 (19.3 overs)	v	Royal Challengers Bangalore; 136/5 (18 overs)
Grace Harris 46 (32); Ellyse Perry 3/16 (4 overs)		Kanika Ahuja 46 (30); Deepti Sharma 2/26 (4 overs)

Royal Challengers Bangalore won by 5 wickets
DY Patil Stadium, Mumbai
Umpires: Madanagopal Kuppuraj and Sanjay Kumar Singh
Player of the match: Kanika Ahuja (Royal Challengers Bangalore)

- Royal Challengers Bangalore won the toss and elected to field.

Match 14
16 March 2023
19:30 (N)
Scorecard

Gujarat Giants; 147/4 (20 overs)	v	Delhi Capitals; 136 (18.4 overs)
Laura Wolvaardt 57 (45); Jess Jonassen 2/38 (4 overs)		Marizanne Kapp 36 (29); Kim Garth 2/18 (4 overs)

Gujarat Giants won by 11 runs
Brabourne Stadium, Mumbai
Umpires: Saurabh Dhote and Ranjeev Sharma
Player of the match: Ashleigh Gardner (Gujarat Giants)

- Delhi Capitals won the toss and elected to field.

Match 15
18 March 2023
15:30 (D/N)
Scorecard

Mumbai Indians; 127 (20 overs)	v	UP Warriorz; 129/5 (19.3 overs)
Hayley Matthews 35 (30); Sophie Ecclestone 3/15 (4 overs)		Grace Harris 39 (28); Amelia Kerr 2/22 (4 overs)

UP Warriorz won by 5 wickets
DY Patil Stadium, Mumbai
Umpires: Nitin Pandit and Gayathri Venugopalan
Player of the match: Deepti Sharma (UP Warriorz)

- UP Warriorz won the toss and elected to field.

Match 16
18 March 2023
19:30 (N)
Scorecard

Gujarat Giants; 188/4 (20 overs)	v	Royal Challengers Bangalore; 189/2 (15.3 overs)
Laura Wolvaardt 68 (42); Shreyanka Patil 2/17 (2 overs)		Sophie Devine 99 (36); Sneh Rana 1/25 (3.3 overs)

Royal Challengers Bangalore won by 8 wickets
Brabourne Stadium, Mumbai
Umpires: Vrinda Rathi and Sanjay Kumar Singh
Player of the match: Sophie Devine (Royal Challengers Bangalore)

- Gujarat Giants won the toss and elected to bat.

Match 17
20 March 2023
15:30 (D/N)
Scorecard

Gujarat Giants; 178/6 (20 overs)	v	UP Warriorz; 181/7 (19.5 overs)
Ashleigh Gardner 60 (39); Parshavi Chopra 2/29 (4 overs)		Grace Harris 72 (41); Kim Garth 2/29 (4 overs)

UP Warriorz won by 3 wickets
Brabourne Stadium, Mumbai
Umpires: Saurabh Dhote and Sanjay Kumar Singh
Player of the match: Grace Harris (UP Warriorz)

- Gujarat Giants won the toss and elected to bat.
- UP Warriorz qualified for the playoffs as a result of this match while Gujarat Giants and Royal Challengers Bangalore were eliminated.

Match 18
20 March 2023
19:30 (N)
Scorecard

Mumbai Indians; 109/8 (20 overs)	v	Delhi Capitals; 110/1 (9 overs)
Pooja Vastrakar 26 (19); Marizanne Kapp 2/13 (4 overs)		Alice Capsey 38* (17); Hayley Matthews 1/27 (2 overs)

Delhi Capitals won by 9 wickets
DY Patil Stadium, Mumbai
Umpires: Chirra Ravikanthreddy and Ranjeev Sharma
Player of the match: Marizanne Kapp (Delhi Capitals)

- Delhi Capitals won the toss and elected to field.

Match 19
21 March 2023
15:30 (D/N)
Scorecard

Royal Challengers Bangalore; 125/9 (20 overs)	v	Mumbai Indians; 129/6 (16.3 overs)
Richa Ghosh 29 (13); Amelia Kerr 3/22 (4 overs)		Amelia Kerr 31* (27); Kanika Ahuja 2/5 (1 over)

Mumbai Indians won by 4 wickets
DY Patil Stadium, Mumbai
Umpires: Narayanan Janani and Madanagopal Kuppuraj
Player of the match: Amelia Kerr (Mumbai Indians)

- Mumbai Indians won the toss and elected to field.

Match 20
21 March 2023
19:30 (N)
Scorecard

UP Warriorz; 138/6 (20 overs)	v	Delhi Capitals; 142/5 (17.5 overs)
Tahlia McGrath 58* (32); Alice Capsey 3/26 (4 overs)		Meg Lanning 39 (23); Shabnim Ismail 2/29 (3 overs)

Delhi Capitals won by 5 wickets
Brabourne Stadium, Mumbai
Umpires: Nitin Pandit and Gayathri Venugopalan
Player of the match: Alice Capsey (Delhi Capitals)

- Delhi Capitals won the toss and elected to field.
- Delhi Capitals qualified for the final as a result of this match.

== Playoffs ==
=== Bracket ===
Eliminator			Final
			1	Delhi Capitals	131/9 (20 overs)
2	Mumbai Indians	182/4 (20 overs)	2	Mumbai Indians	134/3 (19.3 overs)
3	UP Warriorz	110 (17.4 overs)

=== Eliminator ===
Eliminator
24 March 2023
19:30 (N)
Scorecard

Mumbai Indians; 182/4 (20 overs)	v	UP Warriorz; 110 (17.4 overs)
Nat Sciver-Brunt 72* (38); Sophie Ecclestone 2/39 (4 overs)		Kiran Navgire 43 (27); Issy Wong 4/15 (4 overs)

Mumbai Indians won by 72 runs
DY Patil Stadium, Mumbai
Umpires: Saurabh Dhote and Nitin Pandit
Player of the match: Nat Sciver-Brunt (Mumbai Indians)

- UP Warriorz won the toss and elected to field.
- Issy Wong (Mumbai Indians) became the first player to take a hat-trick in WPL.

=== Final ===
Final
26 March 2023
19:30 (N)
Scorecard

Delhi Capitals; 131/9 (20 overs)	v	Mumbai Indians; 134/3 (19.3 overs)
Meg Lanning 35 (29); Hayley Matthews 3/5 (4 overs)		Nat Sciver-Brunt 60* (55); Radha Yadav 1/24 (4 overs)

Mumbai Indians won by 7 wickets
Brabourne Stadium, Mumbai
Umpires: Narayanan Janani and Vrinda Rathi
Player of the match: Nat Sciver-Brunt (Mumbai Indians)

- Delhi Capitals won the toss and elected to bat.
- Mumbai Indians became the first team to win the Women's Premier League.

== Statistics ==
Most runs
Runs	Player	Team
345	Meg Lanning	Delhi Capitals
332	Nat Sciver-Brunt	Mumbai Indians
302	Tahlia McGrath	UP Warriorz
281	Harmanpreet Kaur	Mumbai Indians
271	Hayley Matthews	Mumbai Indians

- Source: WPLT20.com

Most wickets
Wickets	Player	Team
16	Hayley Matthews	Mumbai Indians
16	Sophie Ecclestone	UP Warriorz
15	Amelia Kerr	Mumbai Indians
15	Issy Wong	Mumbai Indians
15	Saika Ishaque	Mumbai Indians

- Source: WPLT20.com

== Broadcasting ==
In India, Sports 18, Sports 18 Khel and Sports 18 1 HD broadcast the season on television and Jio Cinema streaming online. Sports 18 Khel and Jio Cinema were broadcasting free-to-air.

Country	Television channel	Internet streaming
India	Sports18, Sports18 Khel, Sports18 1 HD	JioCinema
Afghanistan	Radio Television Afghanistan	-
Australia	Fox Sports	YuppTV
Bangladesh	Channel 9, T Sports	-
Caribbean	Flow Sports 2	-
Maldives	Star Sports	Yupp TV, MediaNet
Nepal	Sim TV Nepal	Yupp TV, Net TV Nepal
New Zealand	Sky Sports NZ 2	-
Singapore	StarHub TV+	-
South Africa	Super Sports	-
Sri Lanka	Dialog TV	Yupp TV, SLRC, Peo TV
United Kingdom	Sky Sports Cricket, Sky Sports Main Event	Sky Go
United States & Canada	Willow TV	-
