= List of Women's T20 Challenge Players =

List of cricketers

The following is a complete list of cricketers who have played in the Women's T20 Challenge, listed by team. The competition featured three sides — Supernovsas, Trailblazers, and Velocity — that participated between 2018 and 2022.

== Supernovas ==
Supernovas were an Indian cricket team that used to play Women's Twenty20 cricket in the Women's T20 Challenge. The team played seven Women's Twenty20 matches between 2019 and 2022, having previously played a one-off match without WT20 status in 2018. Seasons given are first and last seasons; the player did not necessarily play in all the intervening seasons.

- Taniya Bhatia (2018–2022)
- Venkateshappa Chandu (2022)
- Harleen Deol (2022)
- Sophie Devine (2018–2019)
- Deandra Dottin (2022)
- Sophie Ecclestone (2022)
- Rajeshwari Gayakwad (2018)
- Chamari Athapaththu (2019–2020/21)
- Mansi Joshi (2022)
- Rashi Kanojiya (2022)
- Harmanpreet Kaur (2018–2022)
- Ayabonga Khaka (2020/21)
- Alana King (2022)
- Veda Krishnamurthy (2018)
- Meg Lanning (2018)
- Sune Luus (2022)
- Meghna Singh (2022)
- Mona Meshram (2018)
- Anuja Patil (2018–2020/21)
- Ellyse Perry (2018)
- Priya Punia (2019–2022)
- Mithali Raj (2018)
- Jemimah Rodrigues (2019–2020/21)
- Megan Schutt (2018)
- Natalie Sciver-Brunt (2019)
- Shakera Selman (2020/21)
- Shashikala Siriwardene (2020/21)
- Lea Tahuhu (2019)
- Pooja Vastrakar (2018–2022)
- Danni Wyatt (2018)
- Poonam Yadav (2019–2020/21)
- Radha Yadav (2019–2020/21)

== Trailblazers ==
Trailblazers were an Indian cricket team that used to play Women's Twenty20 cricket in the Women's T20 Challenge. The team played seven Women's Twenty20 matches between 2019 and 2022, having previously played a one-off match without WT20 status. Seasons given are first and last seasons; the player did not necessarily play in all the intervening seasons.

- Suzie Bates (2018–2019)
- Ekta Bisht (2018)
- Natthakan Chantam (2020)
- Harleen Deol (2019–2020)
- Deandra Dottin (2020)
- Sophia Dunkley (2022)
- Sophie Ecclestone (2019–2020)
- Bharti Fulmali (2019)
- Rajeshwari Gayakwad (2019–2022)
- Richa Ghosh (2020–2022)
- Jhulan Goswami (2018–2020)
- Danielle Hazell (2018)
- Alyssa Healy (2018)
- Dayalan Hemalatha (2018–2020)
- Ravi Kalpana (2019)
- Smriti Mandhana (2018–2022)
- Hayley Matthews (2022)
- Sabbhineni Meghana (2022)
- Beth Mooney (2018)
- Shikha Pandey (2018)
- Nuzhat Parween (2020)
- Arundhati Reddy (2022)
- Renuka Singh (2022)
- Jemimah Rodrigues (2018–2022)
- Salma Khatun (2020–2022)
- Shakera Selman (2019)
- Deepti Sharma (2018–2020)
- Sharmin Akhter (2022)
- Lea Tahuhu (2018)
- Stafanie Taylor (2019)
- Poonam Yadav (2018–2022)
