= 2019–20 Women's Senior T20 Challenger Trophy =

- Dates: 4 – 10 January 2020
- Administrator(s): BCCI
- Cricket format: Twenty20
- Tournament format(s): Double round-robin and final
- Champions: India C (1st title)
- Runners-up: India B
- Participants: 3
- Matches: 7
- Most runs: Shafali Verma (189)
- Most wickets: Rajeshwari Gayakwad (8)

The 2019–20 Women's Senior T20 Challenger Trophy was the third edition of India's Women's T20 Challenger Trophy. Three teams made up of the best players in India competed in a double round-robin group, with the top two advancing to the final. The three teams competing were renamed from the previous two tournaments: India Blue, Green and Red became India A, B and C, with India C beating India B in the final by 8 wickets to win the tournament. All matches were held at the Barabati Stadium, Cuttack across a week in January 2020.

== Competition format ==
The three teams played in a double round-robin group, playing each other team twice, with the top two advancing to the final. Matches were played using a Twenty20 format.

The group worked on a points system with positions with the group being based on the total points. Points were awarded as follows:

Win: 4 points.
Tie: 2 points.
Loss: 0 points.
No Result/Abandoned: 2 points.

If points in the final table were equal, the teams were to be separated by their Net Run Rate.

== Squads ==
India A	India B	India C
Harmanpreet Kaur (c); Zaman Akhter; Taniya Bhatia (wk); Bharti Fulmali; Mansi Joshi; Minnu Mani; Priya Punia; Sneh Rana; Deepti Sharma; Shivali Shinde; Meghna Singh; Devika Vaidya; Radha Yadav; Komal Zanzad	Smriti Mandhana (c); Shrayosi Aich; Sushree Dibyadarshini; Richa Ghosh; Ravi Kalpana (wk); Tanuja Kanwer; Shikha Pandey; Anuja Patil; Jemimah Rodrigues; Anjali Sarvani; Renuka Singh; Pooja Vastrakar; Vellaswamy Vanitha; Sushma Verma (wk)	Veda Krishnamurthy (c); Vrushali Bhagat; Yastika Bhatia; Manali Dakshini; Rajeshwari Gayakwad; Jincy George; Dayalan Hemalatha; Madhuri Mehta; Nuzhat Parween (wk); Monica Patel; Arundhati Reddy; Tanusree Sarkar; Kshama Singh; Shafali Verma

Source: BCCI

== Standings ==
Team	Pld	W	L	T	NR	Pts	NRR
India B (Q)	4	3	0	0	1	14	+0.863
India C (Q)	4	2	2	0	0	8	–0.054
India A	4	0	3	0	1	2	–0.783

Source: Cricbuzz

== Group stage ==
Match 1
4 January 2020
Scorecard

India A	v	India B

Match Abandoned
Barabati Stadium, Cuttack
Umpires: Manish Jain and Piyush Khakhar

- No toss.
- No play possible due to rain.
- Points: India A 2, India B 2.

Match 2
5 January 2020
Scorecard

India B 94/8 (20 overs)	v	India C 90/8 (20 overs)
Richa Ghosh 25 (26); Rajeshwari Gayakwad 3/7 (4 overs)		Dayalan Hemalatha 20 (31); Sushree Dibyadarshini 3/15 (4 overs)

India B won by 4 runs
Barabati Stadium, Cuttack
Umpires: Ganesh Charhate and Manish Jain

- India C won the toss and elected to field.
- Points: India B 4, India C 0.

Match 3
6 January 2020
Scorecard

India C 123/7 (20 overs)	v	India A 113/6 (20 overs)
Shafali Verma 38 (24); Deepti Sharma 2/20 (4 overs)		Deepti Sharma 34* (29); Manali Dakshini 1/8 (2 overs)

India C won by 10 runs
Barabati Stadium, Cuttack
Umpires: Ganesh Charhate and Piyush Khakhar

- India C won the toss and elected to bat.
- Points: India C 4, India A 0.

Match 4
7 January 2020
Scorecard

India B 139/4 (20 overs)	v	India A 104/7 (20 overs)
Smriti Mandhana 34 (25); Sneh Rana 2/26 (4 overs)		Priya Punia 34 (33); Sushree Dibyadarshini 2/18 (4 overs)

India B won by 35 runs
Barabati Stadium, Cuttack
Umpires: Manish Jain and Piyush Khakhar

- India B won the toss and elected to bat.
- Points: India B 4, India A 0.

Match 5
9 January 2020
Scorecard

India C 135/4 (20 overs)	v	India A 133/9 (20 overs)
Veda Krishnamurthy 47* (29); Radha Yadav 3/23 (4 overs)		Priya Punia 60 (44); Rajeshwari Gayakwad 3/28 (4 overs)

India C won by 2 runs
Barabati Stadium, Cuttack
Umpires: Ganesh Charhate and Piyush Khakhar

- India C won the toss and elected to bat.
- Points: India C 4, India A 0.

Match 6
9 January 2020
Scorecard

India C 148/8 (20 overs)	v	India B 152/5 (18.4 overs)
Shafali Verma 46 (31); Renuka Singh 2/21 (4 overs)		Pooja Vastrakar 37 (21); Tanusree Sarkar 1/20 (3 overs)

India B won by 5 wickets
Barabati Stadium, Cuttack
Umpires: Ganesh Charhate and Manish Jain

- India C won the toss and elected to bat.
- Points: India B 4, India C 0.

== Final ==
10 January 2020
Scorecard

India B 131/6 (20 overs)	v	India C 135/2 (15.2 overs)
Pooja Vastrakar 43* (22); Manali Dakshini 3/15 (4 overs)		Shafali Verma 89* (48); Shikha Pandey 1/31 (3 overs)

India C won by 8 wickets
Barabati Stadium, Cuttack
Umpires: Manish Jain and Piyush Khakhar

- India B won the toss and elected to bat.

== Statistics ==
=== Most runs ===
Player	Team	Matches	Innings	Runs	Average	HS	100s	50s
Shafali Verma	India C	5	5	189	47.25	89*	0	1
Priya Punia	India A	3	3	119	39.66	60	0	1
Pooja Vastrakar	India B	4	4	99	49.50	43*	0	0
Richa Ghosh	India B	4	4	98	24.50	36	0	0
Vellaswamy Vanitha	India B	4	4	92	23.00	30	0	0

Source: CricketArchive

=== Most wickets ===
Player	Team	Overs	Wickets	Average	BBI	5w
Rajeshwari Gayakwad	India C	20.0	8	12.87	3/7	0
Sushree Dibyadarshini	India B	14.0	7	11.42	3/15	0
Arundhati Reddy	India C	18.4	6	19.33	3/29	0
Radha Yadav	India A	12.0	5	14.00	3/23	0
Manali Dakshini	India C	10.0	4	13.75	3/15	0

Source: CricketArchive
