= England women's cricket team in India in 2018–19 =

International cricket tour

	India women	England women
- Dates: 18 February – 9 March 2019
Captains	Mithali Raj (WODIs); Smriti Mandhana (WT20Is)	Heather Knight

One Day International series
- Results: India women won the 3-match series 2–1
Most runs	Smriti Mandhana (153)	Nat Sciver (130)
Most wickets	Shikha Pandey (8); Jhulan Goswami (8)	Katherine Brunt (5)
- Player of the series: Smriti Mandhana (Ind)

Twenty20 International series
- Results: England women won the 3-match series 3–0
Most runs	Smriti Mandhana (72)	Danni Wyatt (123)
Most wickets	Ekta Bisht (3); Radha Yadav (3)	Katherine Brunt (5); Linsey Smith (5)
- Player of the series: Danni Wyatt (Eng)

The England women's cricket team played the India women's cricket team in February and March 2019. The tour consisted of three Women's One Day Internationals (WODIs), which formed part of the 2017–20 ICC Women's Championship, and three Women's Twenty20 International (WT20) matches. India Women won the WODI series 2–1.

The second WT20I match of the series was the 600th Women's Twenty20 International match to be played. England Women won the WT20I series 3–0.

== Squads ==
WODIs		WT20Is	
India	England	India	England
Mithali Raj (c); Taniya Bhatia (wk); Ekta Bisht; Harleen Deol; Rajeshwari Gayakwad; Jhulan Goswami; Mansi Joshi; Ravi Kalpana (wk); ~~Harmanpreet Kaur~~; Smriti Mandhana; Mona Meshram; Shikha Pandey; Punam Raut; Jemimah Rodrigues; Deepti Sharma; Poonam Yadav	Heather Knight (c); Tammy Beaumont; Katherine Brunt; Kate Cross; Sophia Dunkley; Sophie Ecclestone; Georgia Elwiss; Alex Hartley; Amy Jones; Laura Marsh; Nat Sciver; Anya Shrubsole; Sarah Taylor (wk); Lauren Winfield; Danni Wyatt	Smriti Mandhana (c); Taniya Bhatia (wk); Ekta Bisht; Harleen Deol; Bharti Fulmali; Veda Krishnamurthy; Shikha Pandey; Anuja Patil; Mithali Raj; Arundhati Reddy; Jemimah Rodrigues; Deepti Sharma; Poonam Yadav; Radha Yadav; Komal Zanzad	Heather Knight (c); Tammy Beaumont; Katherine Brunt; Kate Cross; Freya Davies; Sophia Dunkley; ~~Sophie Ecclestone~~; Georgia Elwiss; Alex Hartley; Amy Jones (wk); Laura Marsh; Nat Sciver; Anya Shrubsole; Linsey Smith; Lauren Winfield; Danni Wyatt

Harmanpreet Kaur was ruled out of India's WODI squad due to injury and was replaced by Harleen Deol. Sophie Ecclestone was ruled out of England's WT20I squad, after suffering a broken hand during the WODI series. Alex Hartley was named as Ecclestone's replacement in England's WT20I squad.

== Tour match ==
=== 50-over match: Indian Board President's Women XI v England Women ===
18 February 2019
09:00
Scorecard

Indian Board President's Women XI; 154 (49 overs)	v	England; 157/8 (37.3 overs)
Minnu Mani 28 (57); Anya Shrubsole 4/30 (8 overs)		Heather Knight 64* (86); Komal Zanzad 3/14 (7 overs)

England Women won by 2 wickets
Wankhede Stadium, Mumbai
Umpires: Akshay Marathe (Ind) and Milind Pathak (Ind)

- Indian Board President's Women XI won the toss and elected to bat.

== WODI series ==
=== 1st WODI ===
ICC Women's Championship
22 February 2019
09:00
Scorecard

India; 202 (49.4 overs)	v	England; 136 (41 overs)
Jemimah Rodrigues 48 (58); Sophie Ecclestone 2/27 (10 overs)		Nat Sciver 44 (66); Ekta Bisht 4/25 (8 overs)

India Women won by 66 runs
Wankhede Stadium, Mumbai
Umpires: K. N. Ananthapadmanabhan (Ind) and Puttarangaiah Jayapal
Player of the match: Ekta Bisht (Ind)

- England Women won the toss and elected to field.
- Harleen Deol (Ind) made her WODI debut.
- Points: India Women 2, England Women 0.

=== 2nd WODI ===
ICC Women's Championship
25 February 2019
09:00
Scorecard

England; 161 (43.3 overs)	v	India; 162/3 (41.1 overs)
Nat Sciver 85 (109); Shikha Pandey 4/18 (10 overs)		Smriti Mandhana 63 (74); Anya Shrubsole 2/23 (8 overs)

India Women won by 7 wickets
Wankhede Stadium, Mumbai
Umpires: K. N. Ananthapadmanabhan (Ind) and Puttarangaiah Jayapal
Player of the match: Jhulan Goswami (Ind)

- England Women won the toss and elected to bat.
- Points: India Women 2, England Women 0.

=== 3rd WODI ===
ICC Women's Championship
28 February 2019
09:00
Scorecard

India; 205/8 (50 overs)	v	England; 208/8 (48.5 overs)
Smriti Mandhana 66 (74); Katherine Brunt 5/28 (10 overs)		Danni Wyatt 56 (82); Jhulan Goswami 3/41 (9 overs)

England Women won by 2 wickets
Wankhede Stadium, Mumbai
Umpires: K. N. Ananthapadmanabhan (Ind) and Puttarangaiah Jayapal (Ind)
Player of the match: Katherine Brunt (Eng)

- India Women won the toss and elected to bat.
- Points: England Women 2, India Women 0.

== WT20I series ==
=== 1st WT20I ===
4 March 2019
10:00
Scorecard

England; 160/4 (20 overs)	v	India; 119/6 (20 overs)
Tammy Beaumont 62 (57); Radha Yadav 2/33 (4 overs)		Shikha Pandey 23* (21); Katherine Brunt 2/21 (4 overs)

England Women won by 41 runs
Barsapara Stadium, Guwahati
Umpires: Abhijit Deshmukh (Ind) and Nitin Pandit (Ind)
Player of the match: Tammy Beaumont (Eng)

- India Women won the toss and elected to field.
- Harleen Deol (Ind) made her WT20I debut.

=== 2nd WT20I ===
7 March 2019
10:00
Scorecard

India; 111/8 (20 overs)	v	England; 114/5 (19.1 overs)
Mithali Raj 20 (27); Katherine Brunt 3/17 (4 overs)		Danni Wyatt 64* (55); Ekta Bisht 2/23 (4 overs)

England Women won by 5 wickets
Barsapara Stadium, Guwahati
Umpires: Abhijit Deshmukh (Ind) and Nitin Pandit (Ind)
Player of the match: Danni Wyatt (Eng)

- England Women won the toss and elected to field.
- Bharti Fulmali (Ind) made her WT20I debut.

=== 3rd WT20I ===
9 March 2019
10:00
Scorecard

England; 119/6 (20 overs)	v	India; 118/6 (20 overs)
Tammy Beaumont 29 (27); Harleen Deol 2/13 (2 overs)		Smriti Mandhana 58 (39); Kate Cross 2/18 (4 overs)

England Women won by 1 run
Barsapara Stadium, Guwahati
Umpires: Abhijit Deshmukh (Ind) and Nitin Pandit (Ind)
Player of the match: Kate Cross (Eng)

- England Women won the toss and elected to bat.
