= Jasia =

Jasia is a given name. Notable people with the given name include:

- Jasia Akhtar (born 1988), Indian cricketer
- Jasia Reichardt (born 1933), British art critic, curator, art gallery director, teacher, and writer
