= India Red women's cricket team =

Indian women's cricket team

India Red
Personnel
- Captain: Shikha Pandey (50 over); Deepti Sharma (20 over)

Team information
- Founded: 2008

History
- WCT wins: 3
- WT20CT wins: 0

The India Red women's cricket team, previously known as India Senior, are an Indian women's cricket team that compete in the Senior Women's Challenger Trophy and the Senior Women's T20 Challenger Trophy. The team has no geographical base, instead being made up of some of the best players from across India. The side has won the 50 over Challenger Trophy three times.

== History ==
India Red were first formed in 2008, as India Senior, to compete in the inaugural edition of the 50 over Senior Women's Challenger Trophy, a triangular tournament with teams made from the best players in India. Jhulan Goswami was announced as the captain for the opening season. They started their season disappointingly by losing against India A by 31 runs, in the inaugural match of the tournament. Although they won their next match against India B, they did not qualify for the final and finished bottom of the league.

In the following season, the team were renamed to India Red and competed in the 2009–10 Senior Women's T20 Challenger Trophy, where they again finished bottom of their group. 2010–11 saw a return to the 50 over format, with Reema Malhotra as the team captain. The side once again finished bottom of the league, with no wins. India Red saw improvement in the next season, as they clinched the tournament title for the first time by defeating India Blue by 41 runs.

They also qualified for the final in the next three seasons playing against the same opponent, but lost each time. They lost by 60 runs in the 2012–13 season, while in the following season, they lost thrillingly by 8 runs. Smriti Mandhana captained the India Red in the 2015 season, as the team won every match of the group stage before losing in the final.

The 2016–17 season saw India Red regain their title, beating India Blue in the final by 7 wickets helped by 62* from Mandhana. After again finishing bottom of the group in 2017–18, the side reached the final of both the 50 over and returning 20 over tournaments, winning the 50 over title but losing the 20 over title. In 2019–20, the 50 over Challenger Trophy was cancelled due to the COVID-19 pandemic and the T20 Challenger Trophy was competed with different teams.

== Seasons ==
=== Senior Women's Challenger Trophy ===
Season	League standings								Final standing
Season	P	W	L	T	NR	NRR	Pts	Pos	Final standing
2008–09	2	1	1	0	0	–0.110	2	3rd	
2010–11	2	0	1	0	1	–0.102	2	3rd	
2011–12	2	1	1	0	0	–0.300	4	2nd	Champions
2012–13	2	2	0	0	0	+1.923	0	1st	Lost final
2013–14	2	2	0	0	0	+0.650	8	1st	Lost final
2015	2	2	0	0	0	+0.806	8	1st	Lost final
2016–17	2	1	1	0	0	+0.280	4	2nd	Champions
2017–18	2	0	2	0	0	–0.557	0	3rd	
2018–19	2	1	1	0	0	–0.049	4	2nd	Champions

=== Senior Women's T20 Challenger Trophy ===
Season	League standings								Final standing
Season	P	W	L	T	NR	NRR	Pts	Pos	Final standing
2009–10	2	1	1	0	0	–0.106	4	3rd	
2018–19	4	3	1	0	0	+0.750	12	1st	Lost final

== Honours ==
- Senior Women's Challenger Trophy:
  - Winners (3): 2011–12, 2016–17 & 2018–19
- Senior Women's T20 Challenger Trophy:
  - Winners (0):
  - Best Finish: Runners-up (2018–19)
