= Senior Women's T20 Challenger Trophy =

Indian cricket tournament

- Countries: India
- Administrator: BCCI
- Format: Twenty20
- First edition: 2009–10
- Latest edition: 2022–23
- Next edition: 2024–25
- Tournament format: Round-robin and final
- Number of teams: 4
- Current champion: India D (1st title)
- Most successful: India Green (1 title); India Blue (1 title); India C (1 title); India D (1 title)

The Senior Women's T20 Challenger Trophy was a women's T20 tournament held in India. The tournament first took place in the 2009–10 season, as the T20 equivalent to the List A Senior Women's Challenger Trophy. The participating teams were the same as in the List A tournament: India Blue, India Green and India Red, with India Green emerging victorious in the final. The tournament later returned in the 2018–19 season, with India Blue winning their first title, defeating India Red by 4 runs in the final. In the third edition of the tournament in 2019–20, the teams competing were named India A, India B and India C, with India C winning the final by 8 wickets over India B. The tournament returned in 2022–23, now with four teams competing, and was won by the new team, India D.

== Competition format ==
Matches in the tournament are played using a Twenty20 format. In the first season, the three teams played each other once in a round-robin format, with the top two in the group advancing to the final to play-off for the title. In the next two seasons, the tournament expanded to a double round-robin format, with teams playing each twice in the initial group stage before the top two advanced to the final. In 2022–23, the tournament changed back to a round-robin format, but with one extra team, meaning the number of overall matches stayed the same.

Teams are awarded 4 points for a win, with most wins being the first tiebreaker if teams are joint on points.

== Tournament results ==
Season	Final			Final venue
Season	Winner	Result	Runner-up	Final venue
2009–10	India Green; 125/9 (20 overs)	India Green won by 24 runs Scorecard	India Blue; 101/7 (20 overs)	Sardar Patel Stadium, Ahmedabad
2018–19	India Blue; 131/7 (20 overs)	India Blue won by 4 Runs Scorecard	India Red; 127/7 (20 overs)	KSCA Cricket Ground (3), Alur, Bangalore
2019–20	India C 135/2 (15.2 overs)	India C won by 8 wickets Scorecard	India B 131/6 (20 overs)	Barabati Stadium, Cuttack
2022–23	India D 148/3 (19 overs)	India D won by 7 wickets Scorecard	India A 144/5 (20 overs)	Shaheed Veer Narayan Singh International Cricket Stadium, Naya Raipur
2024–25
