= 2023 Women's Premier League (cricket) final =

2023 WPL cricket tournament final in India

2023 Women's Premier League Final
- Event: 2023 Women's Premier League
| Delhi Capitals | Mumbai Indians |
| 131/9 | 134/3 |
| 20 overs | 19.3 overs |
- Mumbai Indians won by 7 wickets
- Date: 26 March 2023
- Venue: Brabourne Stadium, Navi Mumbai
- Player of the match: Nat Sciver-Brunt (Mumbai Indians)
- Umpires: Narayanan Janani; Vrinda Rathi

The 2023 Women's Premier League Final was played on 26 March 2023 at the DY Patil Stadium in Navi Mumbai. It was a Day/Night Twenty20 match, which decided the winner of the 2023 season. Mumbai Indians won the match and the title by defeating Delhi Capitals by seven wickets.

== Road to the final ==
Delhi Capitals
vs
Mumbai Indians
League Stage
Opponent
Scorecard
Result
Points
Match No.
Opponent
Scorecard
Result
Points

League progression
| Team | Group matches | | | | | | | | Playoffs | |
| Team | 1 | 2 | 3 | 4 | 5 | 6 | 7 | 8 | E | F |
|---|---|---|---|---|---|---|---|---|---|---|
| Delhi Capitals | 2 | 4 | 4 | 6 | 8 | 8 | 10 | 12 | | L |
| Mumbai Indians | 2 | 4 | 6 | 8 | 10 | 10 | 10 | 12 | W | W |

| Win | Loss | No result |

- Note: The total points at the end of each group match are listed.
- Note: Click on the points (group matches) or W/L (playoffs) to see the match summary.
Playoff stage

| Eliminator | | | Final |
| | | | 1 | Delhi Capitals | 131/9 (20 overs) |
| 2 | Mumbai Indians | 182/4 (20 overs) | 2 | Mumbai Indians | 134/3 (19.3 overs) |
| 3 | UP Warriorz | 110 (17.4 overs) |

Qualified for the finals
Elimator

Opponent
Scorecard
Result
9
UP Warriorz
24 March 2023
Won
2023 Women's Premier League final

== Match ==
=== Match officials ===
- On-field umpires: Narayanan Janani and Vrinda Rathi
- Third umpire: Pashchim Pathak
- Reserve umpire: Gayathri Venugopalan
- Match referee: G. S. Lakshmi
- Toss: Delhi Capitals won the toss and elected to bat.

=== Summary ===
Final
26 March 2023
19:30 (N)
Scorecard

| Delhi Capitals; 131/9 (20 overs) | v | Mumbai Indians; 134/3 (19.3 overs) |
| Meg Lanning 35 (29); Hayley Matthews 3/5 (4 overs) | | Nat Sciver-Brunt 60* (55); Radha Yadav 1/24 (4 overs) |

Mumbai Indians won by 7 wickets
Brabourne Stadium, Mumbai
Umpires: Narayanan Janani and Vrinda Rathi
Player of the match: Nat Sciver-Brunt (Mumbai Indians)

- Delhi Capitals won the toss and elected to bat.
- Mumbai Indians became the first team to win the Women's Premier League.

=== Scorecard ===
Source: ESPNcricinfo

Delhi Capitals innings
| Batter | Method of dismissal | Runs | Balls | Fours | Sixes | Strike rate |
|---|---|---|---|---|---|---|
| Meg Lanning | run out (Amanjot Kaur/Yastika Bhatia) | 35 | 29 | 5 | 0 | 120.69 |
| Shafali Verma | c Amelia Kerr b Issy Wong | 11 | 4 | 1 | 1 | 275.00 |
| Alice Capsey | c Amanjot Kaur b Issy Wong | 0 | 2 | 0 | 0 | 0.00 |
| Jemimah Rodrigues | c Hayley Matthews b Issy Wong | 9 | 8 | 2 | 0 | 112.50 |
| Marizanne Kapp | c Yastika Bhatia b Amelia Kerr | 18 | 21 | 2 | 0 | 85.71 |
| Jess Jonassen | c and b Hayley Matthews | 2 | 11 | 0 | 0 | 18.18 |
| Arundhati Reddy | c Saika Ishaque b Amelia Kerr | 0 | 5 | 0 | 0 | 0.00 |
| Shikha Pandey | not out | 27 | 17 | 3 | 1 | 158.82 |
| Minnu Mani | st Yastika Bhatia b Hayley Matthews | 1 | 9 | 0 | 0 | 11.11 |
| Tania Bhatia | b Hayley Matthews | 0 | 2 | 0 | 0 | 0.00 |
| Radha Yadav | not out | 27 | 12 | 2 | 2 | 225.00 |
| Extras | (0 b, 1lb, 0nb, 0wd) | 1 | | | | |
| Totals | (20 overs, 6.55 runs per over) | 131/9 | | | | |

Mumbai Indians bowling
| Bowler | Overs | Maidens | Runs | Wickets | Economy |
|---|---|---|---|---|---|
| Nat Sciver-Brunt | 4 | 0 | 37 | 0 | 9.25 |
| Issy Wong | 4 | 0 | 42 | 3 | 10.50 |
| Saika Ishaque | 4 | 0 | 28 | 0 | 7.00 |
| Amelia Kerr | 4 | 0 | 18 | 2 | 4.50 |
| Hayley Matthews | 4 | 2 | 5 | 3 | 1.25 |

Fall of wickets: 12/1 (S. Varma, ov), 12/2 (A. Capsey, ov), 35/3 (J. Rodrigues, ov), 73/4 (M. Kapp, ov), 74/5 (M. Lanning, ov), 75/6 (A. Reddy, ov), 75/7 (J. Jonassen, ov), 79/8 (M. Mani, ov), 79/9 (T. Bhatia, ov)

Mumbai Indians innings
| Batter | Method of dismissal | Runs | Balls | Fours | Sixes | Strike rate |
|---|---|---|---|---|---|---|
| Hayley Matthews | c Arundhati Reddy b Jass Jonassen | 13 | 12 | 3 | 0 | 108.33 |
| Yastika Bhatia | c Alice Capsey b Radha Yadav | 4 | 3 | 1 | 0 | 133.33 |
| Nat Sciver-Brunt | not out | 60 | 55 | 7 | 0 | 109.09 |
| Harmanpreet Kaur | run out (Shikha Panday/Alice Capsey) | 37 | 39 | 5 | 0 | 94.87 |
| Amelia Kerr | not out | 14 | 8 | 2 | 0 | 175.00 |
| Pooja Vastrakar | did not bat | | | | | |
| Issy Wong | did not bat | | | | | |
| Humaira Kazi | did not bat | | | | | |
| Amanjot Kaur | did not bat | | | | | |
| Jintimani Kalita | did not bat | | | | | |
| Saika Ishaque | did not bat | | | | | |
| Extras | (0 b, 3lb, 0nb, 3wd) | 6 | | | | |
| Totals | (19.3 overs, 6.87 runs per over) | 134/3 | | | | |

Delhi Capitals bowling
| Bowler | Overs | Maidens | Runs | Wickets | Economy |
|---|---|---|---|---|---|
| Marizanne Kapp | 4 | 0 | 22 | 0 | 5.50 |
| Radha Yadav | 4 | 0 | 24 | 1 | 6.00 |
| Jess Jonassen | 4 | 0 | 28 | 1 | 7.00 |
| Shikha Pandey | 4 | 0 | 23 | 0 | 5.75 |
| Alice Capsey | 3.3 | 0 | 34 | 0 | 9.71 |

Fall of wickets: 13/1 (Y. Bhatia, 1.3 ov), 23/2 (H. Matthews, 3.4 ov). 95/3 (H. Kaur, 16.1 ov)
