= Sri Lanka women's cricket team in India in 2013–14 =

	India	Sri Lanka
- Dates: 17 – 28 January 2014
Captains	Mithali Raj	Shashikala Siriwardene

One Day International series
- Results: India won the 3-match series 3–0
Most runs	Mithali Raj (169)	Yasoda Mendis (79)
Most wickets	Gouher Sultana (8)	Oshadi Ranasinghe (3); Chandima Gunaratne (3)

Twenty20 International series
- Results: Sri Lanka won the 3-match series 2–1
Most runs	Mithali Raj (79)	Shashikala Siriwardene (119)
Most wickets	Soniya Dabir (4); Ekta Bisht (4); Rajeshwari Gayakwad (4)	Udeshika Prabodhani (5)

The Sri Lanka women's national cricket team toured India in January 2014. They played India in three One Day Internationals (ODIs) and three Twenty20 Internationals (T20Is), losing the ODI series 3–0 but winning the T20I series 2–1.

== Squads ==
India	Sri Lanka
Mithali Raj (c); Ekta Bisht; Soniya Dabir; Anagha Deshpande (wk); Rajeshwari Gayakwad; Jhulan Goswami; Karu Jain (wk); Harmanpreet Kaur; Veda Krishnamurthy; Smriti Mandhana; Niranjana Nagarajan; Poonam Yadav; Sneh Rana; Punam Raut; Amita Sharma; Shubhlakshmi Sharma; Gouher Sultana; Vellaswamy Vanitha	Shashikala Siriwardene (c); Chamari Atapattu; Chandima Gunaratne; Eshani Lokusuriyage; Lasanthi Madushani; Dilani Manodara (wk); Yasoda Mendis; Chamari Polgampola; Udeshika Prabodhani; Oshadi Ranasinghe; Deepika Rasangika; Maduri Samuddika; Anushka Sanjeewani (wk); Sripali Weerakkody

== Tour Match ==
=== 50-over match: India A v Sri Lanka ===
17 January 2014
Scorecard

Sri Lanka; 185 (49.5 overs)	v	India A 174 (47.3 overs)
Yasoda Mendis 53 (62); Preeti Bose 3/34 (9.5 overs)		Smriti Mandhana 49 (77); Chandima Gunaratne 2/27 (8.3 overs)

Sri Lanka Women won by 11 runs
Dr PVG Raju ACA Sports Complex, Vizianagaram
Umpires: Rohan Pandit (Ind) and Sanjeev Dua (Ind)

- India A Women won the toss and elected to field.

== WODI Series ==
=== 1st ODI ===
19 January 2014
Scorecard

Sri Lanka; 76 (39.3 overs)	v	India; 80/3 (32.3 overs)
Yasoda Mendis 17 (43); Gouher Sultana 4/4 (8 overs)		Mithali Raj 34* (59); Oshadi Ranasinghe 1/15 (4 overs)

India Women won by 7 wickets
Dr. Y. S. Rajasekhara Reddy ACA–VDCA Cricket Stadium, Visakhapatnam
Umpires: Rohan Pandit (Ind) and Sanjeev Dua (Ind)

- Sri Lanka Women won the toss and elected to bat.
- Rajeshwari Gayakwad and Sneh Rana (Ind) both made their WODI debuts.

=== 2nd ODI ===
21 January 2014
Scorecard

Sri Lanka; 140 (47.1 overs)	v	India; 143/3 (39.3 overs)
Yasoda Mendis 56 (29); Gouher Sultana 4/15 (10 overs)		Smriti Mandhana 51 (74); Chandima Gunaratne 1/25 (8 overs)

India Women won by 7 wickets
Dr. Y. S. Rajasekhara Reddy ACA–VDCA Cricket Stadium, Visakhapatnam
Umpires: Rohan Pandit (Ind) and Sanjeev Dua (Ind)

- India Women won the toss and elected to field.

=== 3rd ODI ===
23 January 2014
Scorecard

India; 229/5 (50 overs)	v	Sri Lanka; 134 (44 overs)
Mithali Raj 104* (109); Chamari Polgampola 2/34 (10 overs)		Oshadi Ranasinghe 29* (49); Poonam Yadav 4/13 (10 overs)

India Women won by 95 runs
Dr. Y. S. Rajasekhara Reddy ACA–VDCA Cricket Stadium, Visakhapatnam
Umpires: Rohan Pandit (Ind) and Sanjeev Dua (Ind)

- Sri Lanka Women won the toss and elected to field.
- Vellaswamy Vanitha (Ind) and Anushka Sanjeewani (SL) both made their WODI debuts.

== WT20I Series ==
=== 1st T20I ===
25 January 2014
Scorecard

India; 147/3 (20 overs)	v	Sri Lanka; 148/7 (19.5 overs)
Mithali Raj 67 (47); Oshadi Ranasinghe 2/27 (4 overs)		Shashikala Siriwardene 52 (39); Rajeshwari Gayakwad 3/24 (4 overs)

Sri Lanka Women won by 3 wickets
Dr PVG Raju ACA Sports Complex, Vizianagaram
Umpires: Krishnamachari Bharatan (Ind) and Umesh Dubey (Ind)

- Sri Lanka Women won the toss and elected to field.
- Rajeshwari Gayakwad, Vellaswamy Vanitha (Ind) and Anushka Sanjeewani (SL) all made their WT20I debuts.

=== 2nd T20I ===
26 January 2014
Scorecard

India; 127/8 (20 overs)	v	Sri Lanka; 118/8 (20 overs)
Amita Sharma 23 (17); Udeshika Prabodhani 3/16 (4 overs)		Chamari Atapattu 40 (40); Soniya Dabir 1/14 (4 overs)

India Women won by 9 runs
Dr PVG Raju ACA Sports Complex, Vizianagaram
Umpires: Krishnamachari Bharatan (Ind) and Umesh Dubey (Ind)

- Sri Lanka Women won the toss and elected to field.
- Sneh Rana (Ind) made her WT20I debut.

=== 3rd T20I ===
28 January 2014
Scorecard

India; 117/8 (20 overs)	v	Sri Lanka; 121/4 (18.5 overs)
Punam Raut 38 (45); Maduri Samuddika 2/18 (4 overs)		Shashikala Siriwardene 46* (42); Ekta Bisht 2/22 (4 overs)

Sri Lanka Women won by 6 wickets
Dr. Y. S. Rajasekhara Reddy ACA–VDCA Cricket Stadium, Visakhapatnam
Umpires: Krishnamachari Bharatan (Ind) and Umesh Dubey (Ind)

- India Women won the toss and elected to bat.
- Karu Jain (Ind) made her WT20I debut.
