= Veer Narayan Singh =

Indian activist (1795–1857)

- वीर नारायण सिंह
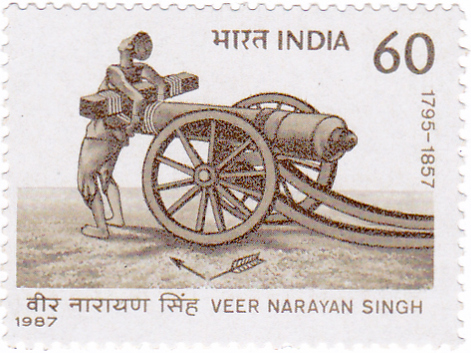
- A 1987 postal stamp issued in honor of Veer Narayan Singh
- Born: 1795; Sonakhan, Chhattisgarh, India
- Died: December 10, 1857 (aged 61–62); Raipur, Chhattisgarh, India
- Cause of death: Execution by hanging
- Occupation: Zamindar of Sonakhan
- Known for: Leading a tribal rebellion against British rule in Chhattisgarh
- Movement: Indian Rebellion of 1857

Veer Narayan Singh (1795 – 10 December 1857) was a landlord and freedom fighter from Sonakhan, in present-day Chhattisgarh, known for his participation in the Indian Rebellion of 1857. He is regarded as the first freedom fighter from Chhattisgarh.

== Early life and background ==
Veer Narayan Singh was born in Chhattisgarh. His family had a history of administrative leadership, with his great-grandfather serving as the Dewan of Sonakhan. At the age of 35, he inherited the landlordship from his father, Ram Rai.

== Role in the 1857 Rebellion ==
In 1856, during a severe famine, Veer Narayan Singh was arrested by the British authorities for allegedly looting and redistributing food grains to the poor. He later escaped from prison with the help of Indian soldiers in Raipur. Upon his return to Sonakhan, he mobilized a force of around 500 men to resist British rule. In response, the British dispatched a military force under Captain Smith to suppress the uprising.

== Execution ==
Veer Narayan Singh was captured and executed by hanging on 10 December 1857 at Jaistambh Chowk in Raipur. He is considered the first martyr from Chhattisgarh in the Indian Rebellion of 1857.

== Legacy ==
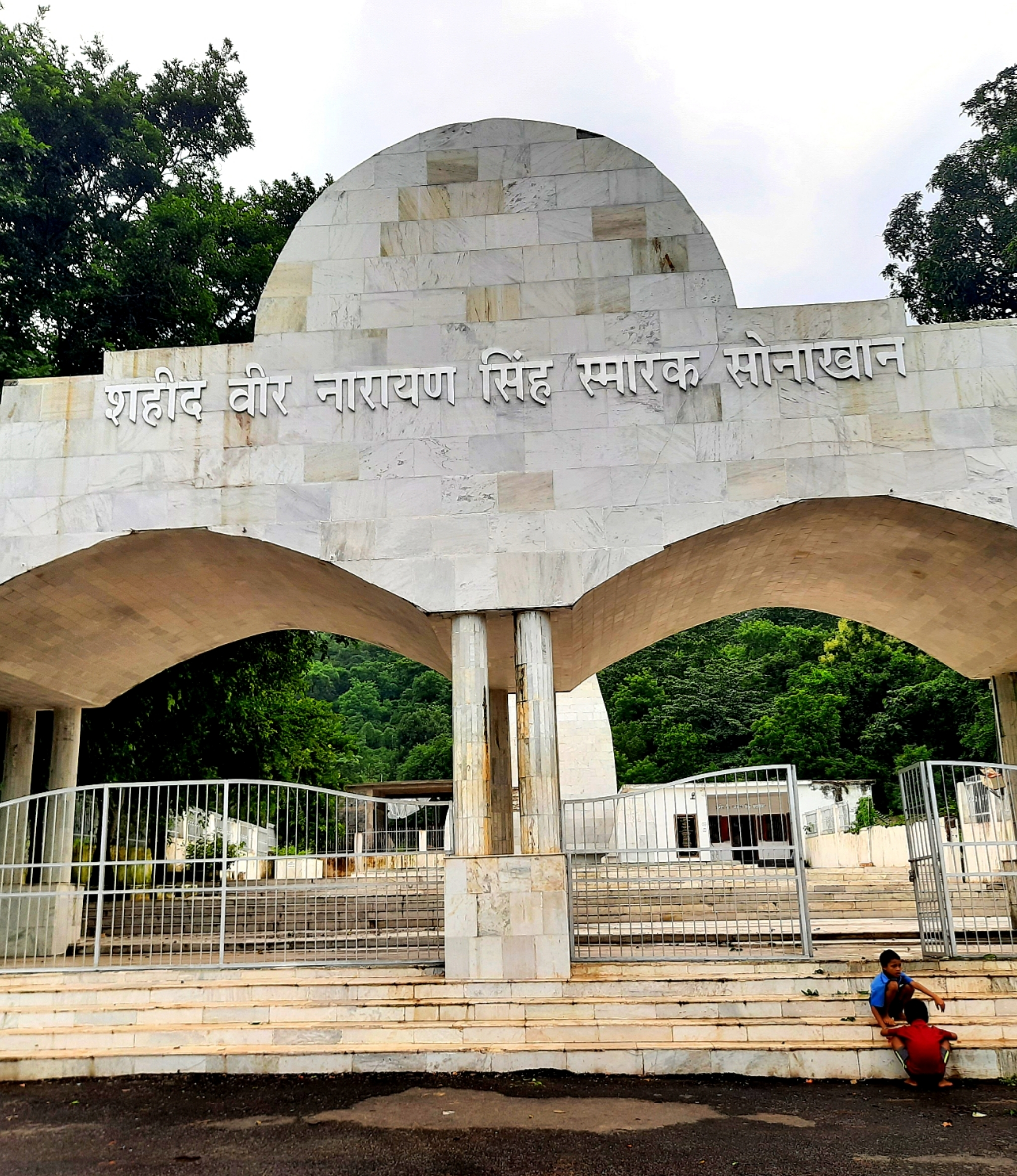
Shahid Veer Narayan Singh Memorial, Sonakhan

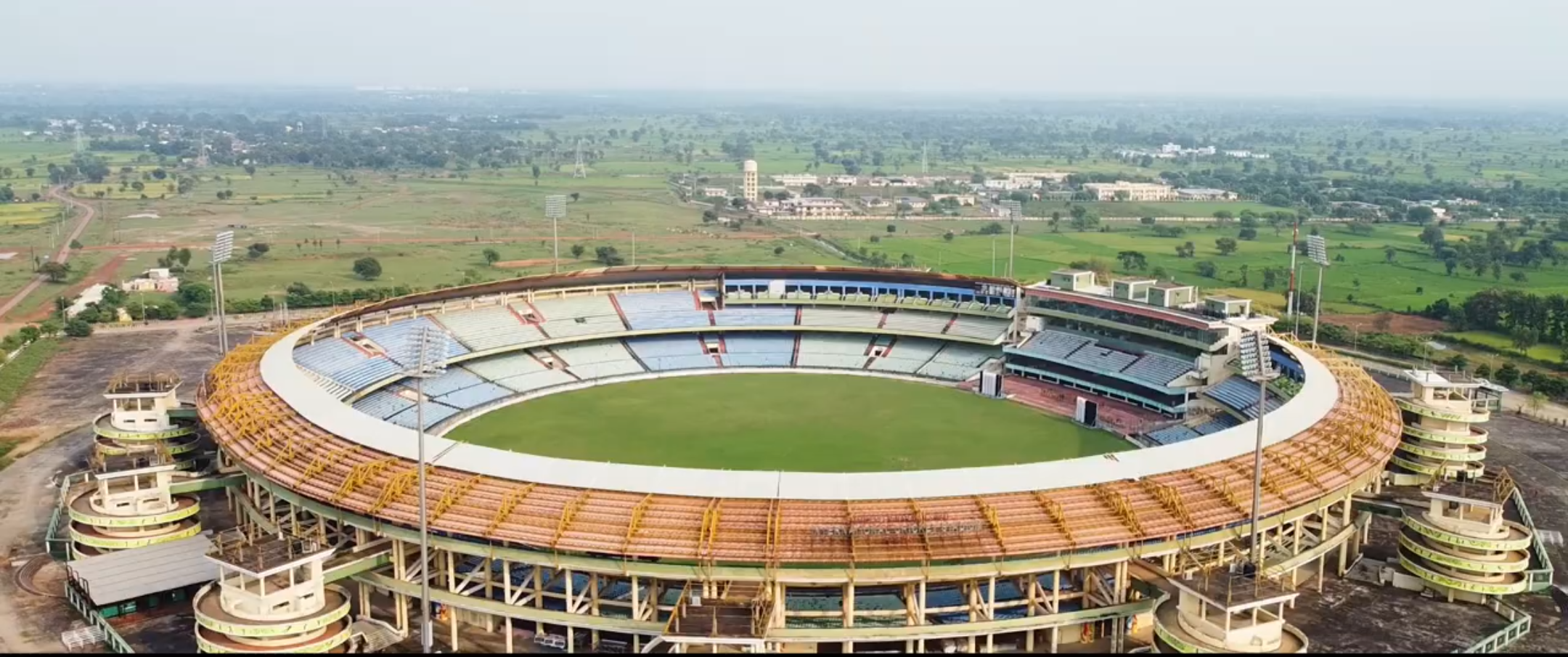
Shaheed Veer Narayan Singh International Cricket Stadium in Raipur

Veer Narayan Singh's martyrdom has been resurrected in the 1990s and he has become a potent symbol of Chhattisgarhi pride. December 10 is observed as 'Shaheed Veer Narayan Singh Sacrifice Day' in Chhattisgarh, with the state government providing a holiday for schools and government offices on this occasion.

In 2022, an open-air memorial dedicated to Veer Narayan Singh was developed in Baloda Bazar district, Chhattisgarh. It includes an open-air museum with art panels and audiobooks narrating his life in three languages. It was established as part of the Sonakhan Tourist Circuit to promote tourism and local economic development.

In 2024, the Chhattisgarh government launched the "Shaheed Veer Narayan Singh Shram Anna Yojana" scheme to provide affordable meals to laborers. Under this scheme, registered workers can avail of full meals for ₹5.

Several landmarks have been named in his honor:

=== Infrastructure and institutions ===
- Shaheed Veer Narayan Singh International Cricket Stadium, Raipur.
- Shahid Veer Narayan Singh Commercial Complex, near Ghadi Chowk, Raipur.
- Government Shahid Veer Narayan Singh College (GSVNSC), Bilaigarh, affiliated with Pandit Ravishankar Shukla University.
- Sahid Veer Narayan Singh H.S. Vidyalaya, Bhilai.
- Shahid Veer Narayan Singh Memorial near Raj Bhavan, inaugurated by President Giani Zail Singh in 1984.

=== Commemorations ===
In 1987, the Government of India issued a commemorative postal stamp in his honor.
