= Kanika Ahuja =

Indian cricketer (born 2002)

Personal information
- Full name: Kanika Ahuja
- Born: 7 August 2002 (age 24); Patiala, Punjab, India
- Batting: Left-handed
- Bowling: Right-arm off break
- Role: All-rounder

International information
- National side: India
- T20I debut (cap 77): 21 September 2023 v Malaysia
- Last T20I: 24 September 2023 v Bangladesh

Domestic team information
- Years: Team
- 2017/18–present: Punjab
- 2023–2025: Royal Challengers Bangalore
- 2026–: Gujarat Giants

Career statistics
Competition	WT20I	WLA	WT20
Matches	2	19	42
Runs scored	1	420	28
Batting average	–	35.00	18.69
100s/50s	0/0	0/1	0/0
Top score	1*	90	48
Balls bowled	–	802	393
Wickets	–	38	18
Bowling average	–	13.18	20.38
5 wickets in innings	–	2	0
10 wickets in match	–	0	0
Best bowling	–	5/23	3/16
Catches/stumpings	0/–	3/–	11/–
Medal record
Representing India
Women's Cricket
Asian Games
Gold medal – first place	2022 Hangzhou	Team
- Source: CricketArchive, 2 November 2023

Kanika Ahuja (born 7 August 2002) is an Indian cricketer who currently plays for Punjab and Gujarat Giants and India. She is a left-handed batter and right-arm off break bowler.

She made her international debut in September 2023, in a Twenty20 International for India against Malaysia.

== Early life ==
Ahuja was born on 7 August 2002 in Patiala, Punjab.

== Domestic career ==
Ahuja made her debut for Punjab in the 2017–18 Senior Women's T20 League against Odisha. She was the joint-leading wicket-taker in the 2021–22 Women's Senior One Day Trophy, with 15 wickets at an average of 13.13. She took her List A best bowling figures in that tournament, with 5/23 from 10 overs against Maharashtra. She also made her List A high score in the same tournament, with 90 from 88 deliveries against Rajasthan.

In February 2023, Ahuja was signed by Royal Challengers Bangalore at the inaugural Women's Premier League auction, for the 2023 season. She played seven matches for the side that season, scoring 98 runs and taking two wickets. She was named as Player of the Match in her side's first win of the tournament, as she scored 48 from 30 deliveries and took 2 catches.

In February 2024, Ahuja was ruled out of WPL 2024 due to injuries.

== International career ==
In June 2023, Ahuja played for India A at the 2023 ACC Women's T20 Emerging Teams Asia Cup. She was named as Player of the Match in the final as India A won the tournament, scoring 30* and taking two wickets.

In September 2023, Ahuja was named in her first India squad, for the Asian Games. She made her Twenty20 International debut in the quarter-final of the tournament, which was curtailed by rain. She played one further match at the tournament, the semi-final.
