= Shaheed Veer Narayan Singh International Cricket Stadium =

International cricket stadium in Nava Raipur Atal Nagar, Chhattisgarh, India

Shaheed Veer Narayan Singh International Cricket Stadium, Raipur
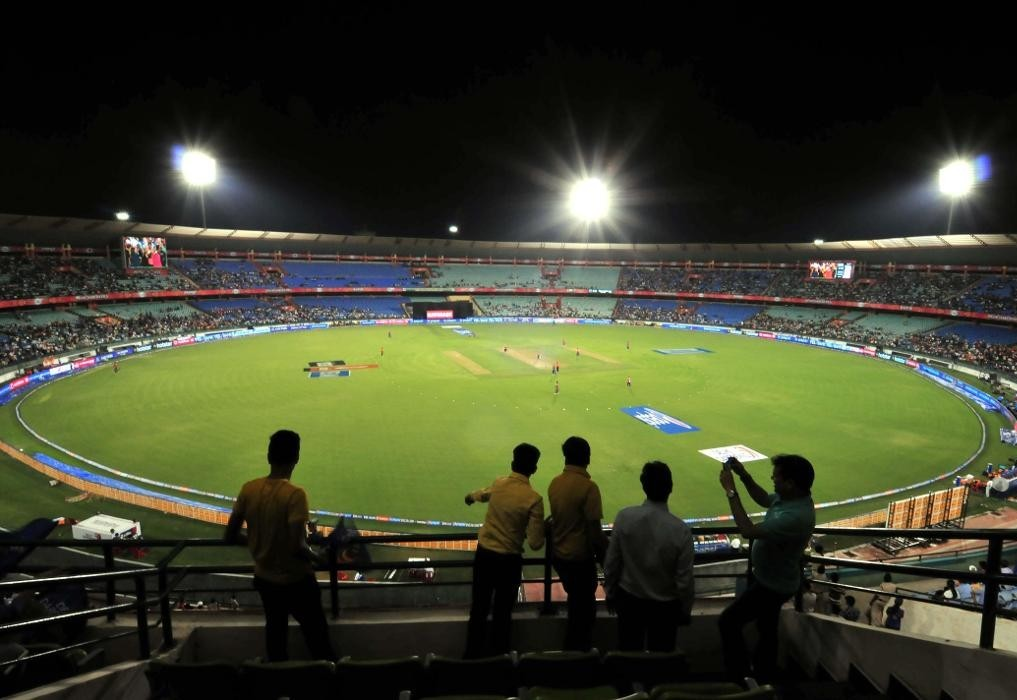
- Interactive map of Shaheed Veer Narayan Singh International Cricket Stadium, Raipur

Ground information
- Location: Nava Raipur, Chhattisgarh, India
- Country: India
- Coordinates: 21°12′15″N 81°49′24″E
- Establishment: 11 September 2008
- Capacity: 65,000
- Owner: Government of Chhattisgarh
- Operator: Chhattisgarh State Cricket Sangh
- End names
- North End; South End

International information
- First men's ODI: 21 January 2023: India v New Zealand
- Last men's ODI: 3 December 2025: India v South Africa
- First men's T20I: 1 December 2023: India v Australia
- Last men's T20I: 23 January 2026: India v New Zealand
- First women's T20I: 16 October 2026: India v Zimbabwe
- Last women's T20I: 20 October 2026: India v Zimbabwe

Team information
| Chhattisgarh cricket team | (2009–present) |
| Delhi Daredevils | (2013–2016) |
| Royal Challengers Bengaluru | (2026) |
- As of 1 December 2025; Source: ESPNcricinfo

The Shaheed Veer Narayan Singh International Cricket Stadium, also known as the Nava Raipur International Cricket Stadium, is a 65,000-seater venue in the city of Nava Raipur, Raipur, Chhattisgarh, India. It is the third largest cricket stadium in India and the fourth largest cricket stadium in the world. It became the country's 50th international cricket venue in 2023. It is among the largest cricket stadiums in India in terms of boundary dimensions.

Inaugurated in 2008, this ground hosted its first-ever match in 2010, when the Canada national cricket team arrived in India and played a practice match against the Chhattisgarh state team. In 2013, the stadium was declared a second home venue for the Delhi Daredevils in the Indian Premier League and has since hosted many of the team's matches. The first international cricket match played here was an ODI between India and New Zealand in 2023, which was won by India.

== Construction ==
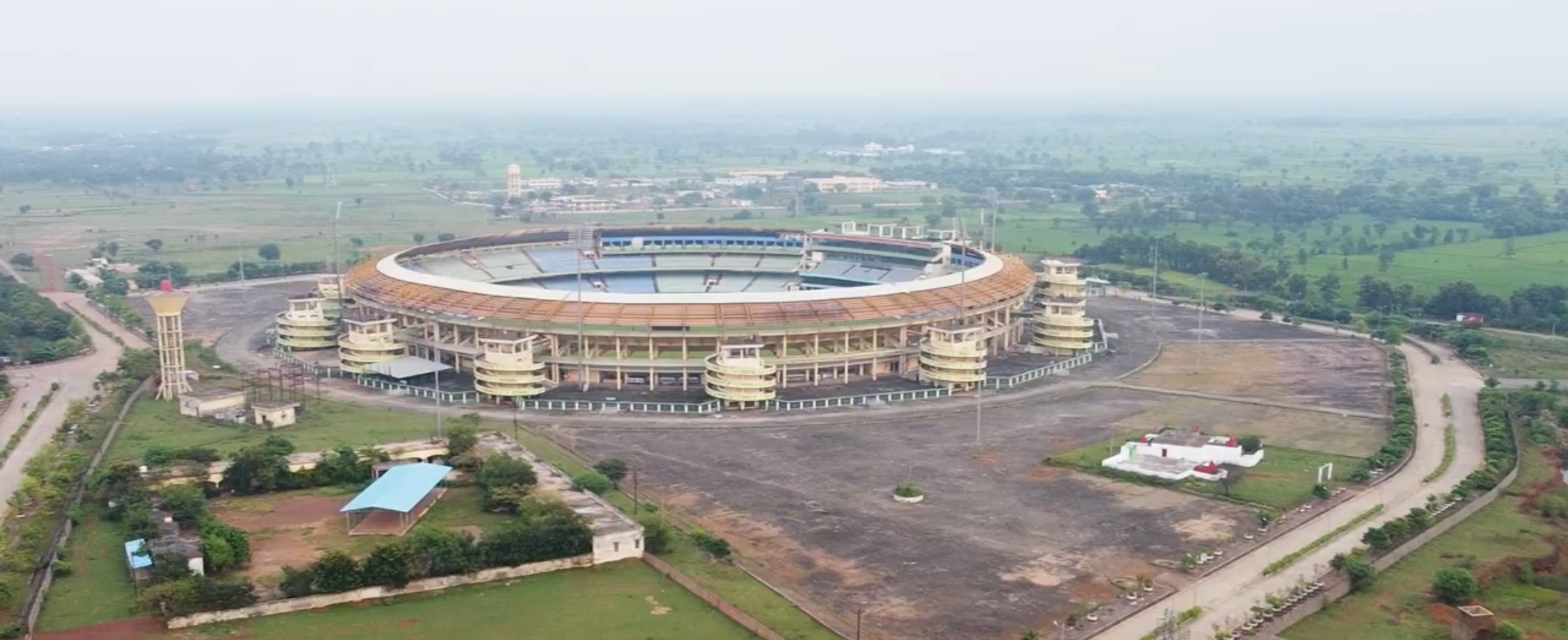
Shaheed Veer Narayan Singh International Cricket stadium Raipur Drone view.

The stadium is named after Veer Narayan Singh Binjhwar, a landlord from Sonakhan who spearheaded the 1857 Sepoy Rebellion in Chhattisgarh.

The stadium is situated in sector-3 of Naya Raipur Near Sendh Lake, close to the Swami Vivekananda Airport in Naya Raipur. It is 21 km away from Raipur.

The construction of the stadium began in the year 2006 and was completed in 2008 at the cost of Rs 145 Crore. It is built and owned by the Government of Chhattisgarh. The stadium has been built with the facilities of a modern sports arena. The media facilities as well as the corporate boxes have been renovated and roofs cover the rest of the ground to provide comfort during hot periods.

== Pitch and Long Boundary ==
It has hosted 3 IPL, one CLT20 and the 2020–21 Road Safety World Series at this venue. A team has scored more than 200 runs twice during the Road Safety World Series.

Raipur's ground is considered one of the biggest grounds in India in terms of boundary dimension. This gives a level playing field and balance to game from the perspective of both batsmen and bowlers. The size of the field is 180 yards x 160 yards, and the length of the boundaries are 80 meters on average.

A Maximum of 84 m boundary can be set for all format matches here in Raipur, International commentators have compared this stadium with the likes of The Gabba in Australia.

BCCI had adjudged the pitch and ground of Shaheed Veer Narayan International Cricket Stadium as the Best pitch and Best ground of the Central Zone for the year 2017–18. It is notable that Naya Raipur Cricket Ground had been adjudged the best during IPL 2013, Pitch curator Shamim Mirza and ground staff had been congratulated for the above achievements.

== Initial Games ==
The first international standard cricket match was played between the Canada national cricket team and the Chhattisgarh cricket team. The game was a One-Day match, played on 21 November 2010.

The Stadium hosted a Half-Marathon, with the theme "Let us run" on 16 December 2012 to mark Vijay Diwas. Sunil Gavaskar had rated this stadium as one of the best stadiums in the country and had proposed to utilize it for all types of matches. Irfan Pathan who was in awe of the facilities in the stadium noted that "When opportunities are created, and such facilities are in place, there is the hope that new cricketers will emerge."

== Road Safety & CCL ==
=== Road Safety ===
The 2020-21 Road Safety World Series was postponed on 24 March 2020 after four matches due to COVID-19 lockdown in India. After almost a year, the tournament resumed with the announcement of all the matches to be played in Raipur with all COVID-19 guidelines being followed allowing only 50% audience capacity of the stadium. The tournament hosted matches between 5 and 21 March 2021.

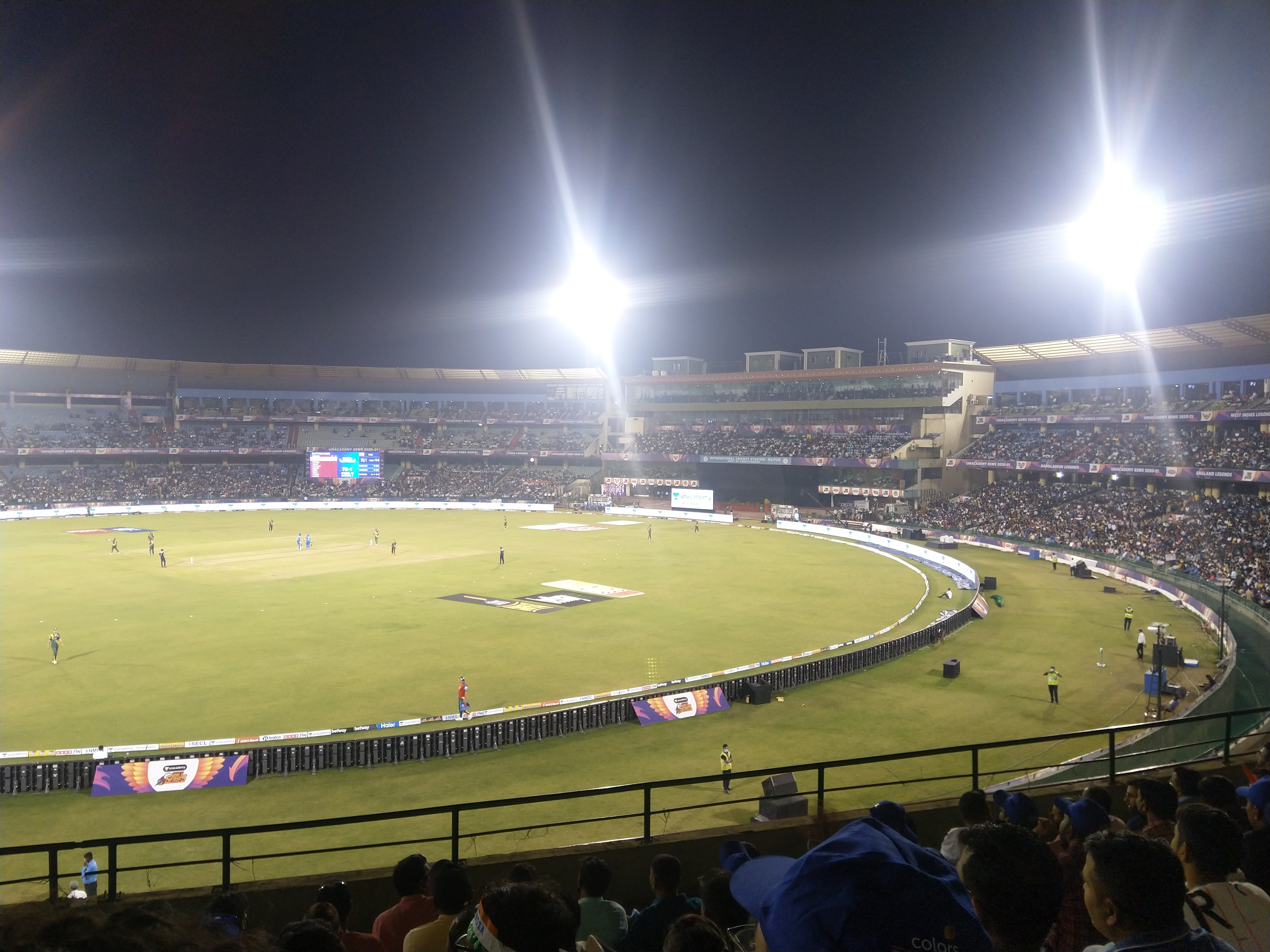
SVNS International Stadium during Road Safety World Series 2020–2021

2022 Road Safety World Series whose Five matches with two league matches and two semifinals and Final match was held in Raipur

=== CCL 2023 ===
Four matches of Celebrity Cricket League 2023 were played in Raipur between 18 February and 19 February at Shaheed Veer Narayan Singh Cricket Stadium in Raipur. The first match of the cricketing event was played between Telugu Warriors and Kerala Strikers on 18 February while in the second match, Chennai Rhinos was faced by Karnataka Bulldozers. On 19 February, the first match was played between Bengal Tiger Vs Bhojpuri Dabanggs while the second match was played between Mumbai Heroes and Punjab De Sher.

== Hosting of IPL and CL T20 ==
=== IPL matches ===
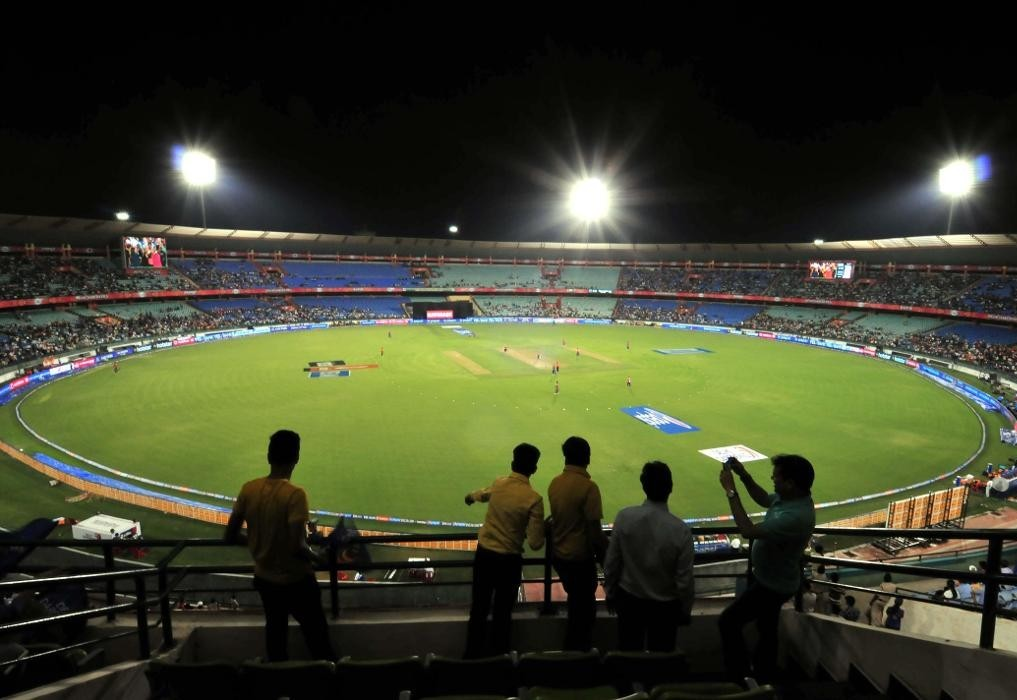
SVNS Stadium, Raipur during IPL

In January 2013, the Board of Control for Cricket in India announced that Delhi Daredevils' Indian Premier League team would be playing two of their IPL games at the stadium.

Raipur was allotted two IPL games in January after the chief minister invited GMR, the owners of the Daredevils franchise, to host some of their home matches there. Following inspections and a few meetings, the approvals came in, and in February the state's public works department swung into action to spruce up the ground in time; they completed work on the interior in less than two months.

On 28 April 2013, the first IPL match between Delhi Daredevils and Pune Warriors was played, in which Daredevils beat Warriors by 15 runs. With this it became the 19th venue to host any IPL match. The second match was played on 1 May 2013, between Delhi Daredevils and Kolkata Knight Riders. To ensure a greater success, Chhattisgarh State government had waived the entertainment tax on the tickets.

Few matches of the 2014 Indian Premier League had to take place at the stadium but could not take place due to rescheduling of the matches due to general elections.

In 2015 Indian Premier League, again Raipur was allotted two IPL games with Delhi Daredevils being the host team. On 9 May 2015, the 1st match was played between Delhi Daredevils and Sunrisers Hyderabad, in which Sunrisers beat Daredevils by 6 runs and Moises Henriques was the Man of the Match for his 74 runs of 46 balls. The second match was played on 12 May 2015, between Delhi Daredevils and Chennai Super Kings, in which Daredevils comfortably beat Super Kings by 6 wickets, with Zaheer Khan emerging as the Man of the Match due to his economical bowling.

Raipur was again announced as a 2nd Home Ground for Delhi Daredevils for 2016 Indian Premier League. On 20 May 2016, the 1st match was played between Delhi Daredevils and Sunrisers Hyderabad. This was the 2nd Match in which both teams played each other in this stadium again. While in 2015, Sunrisers beat Daredevils in a close game, this time again it came down to the last ball. This time, it was Daredevils who won by beating Sunrisers by 6 wickets on the very last ball of the match due to Karun Nair's 83 runs knock for which he was chosen Man of the Match. On 22 May 2016, the second match was played between Delhi Daredevils and Royal Challengers Bangalore, which was also the last league game of 2016 IPL and was a must win game for both teams to qualify for playoffs. Royal Challengers emerged as the winners by defeating Daredevils by 6 wickets and qualified for the playoffs. Delhi Daredevils were knocked out and failed to qualify.

In 2026, Royal Challengers Bengaluru chose Raipur as their second home ground, playing their last two home matches there against the Mumbai Indians and the Kolkata Knight Riders. RCB won both two matches that were held here and Virat Kohli scored his 9th IPL century in the match against Kolkata Knight Riders

=== CL T20 ===
The stadium has also hosted eight T20 matches of the 2014 Champions League Twenty20. These consisted of two Group Stage games, plus all six Qualifier matches. The Qualifier matches were double-headers. For the first time in the history of CLT20, the qualifiers were sold out.

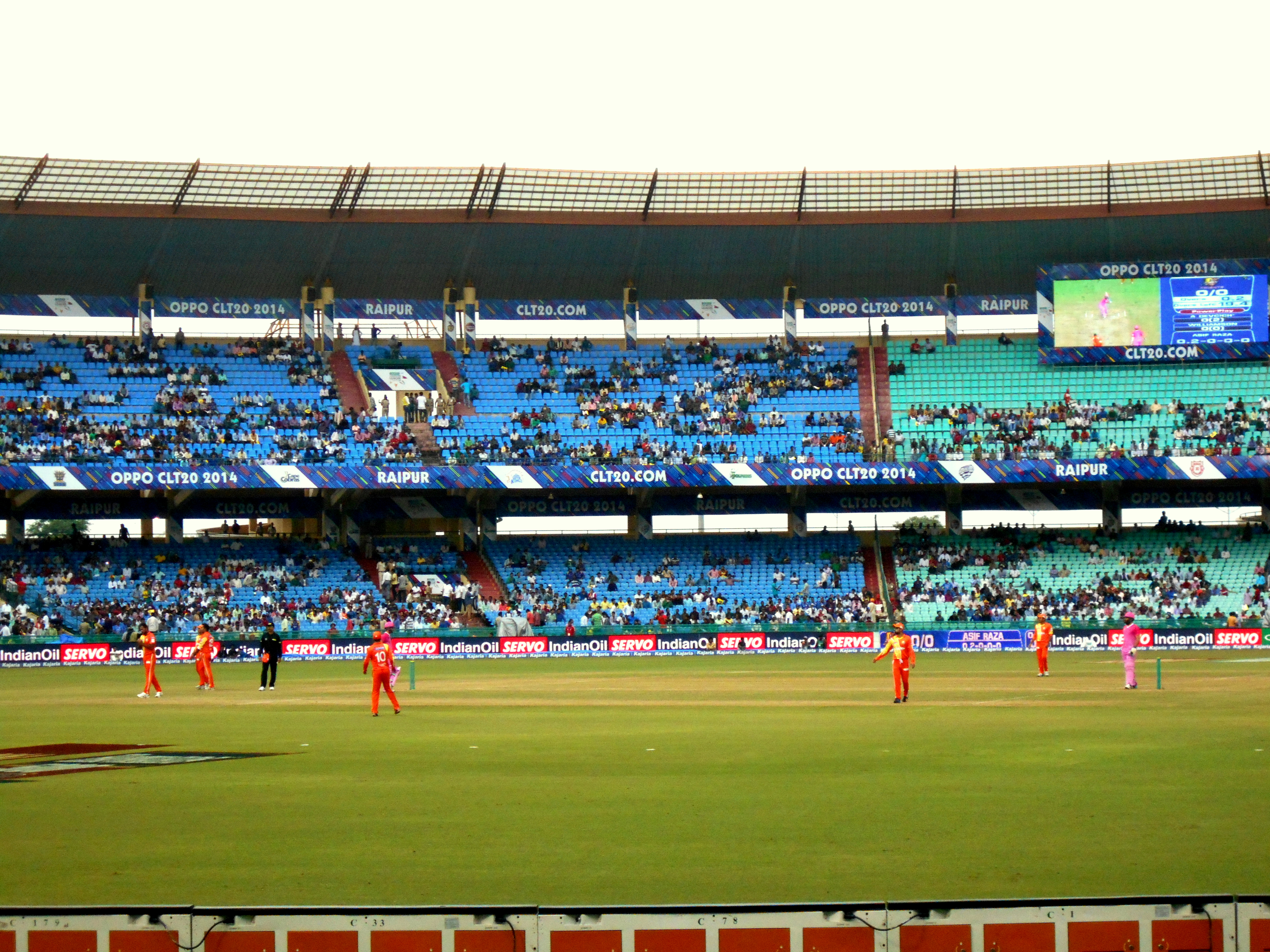
SVNS International Stadium Raipur, during 2014 Champions League Twenty20

== Gallery ==
Shaheed Veer Narayan Singh International Cricket Stadium, Raipur

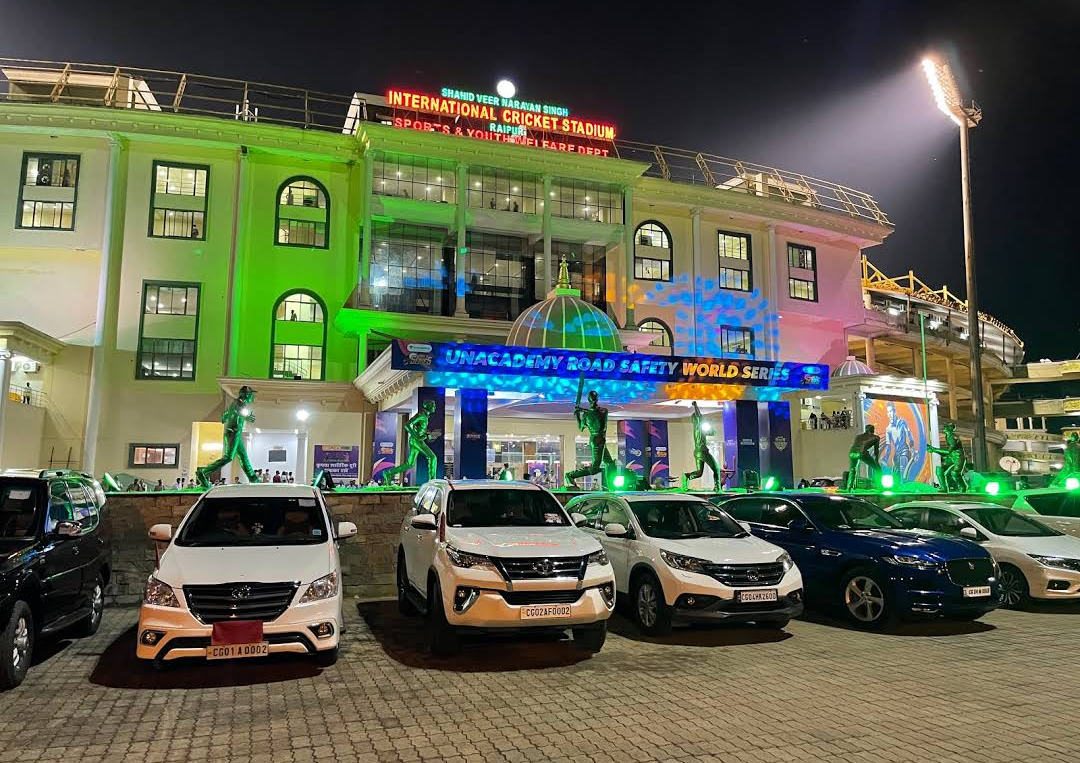
Entrance main building

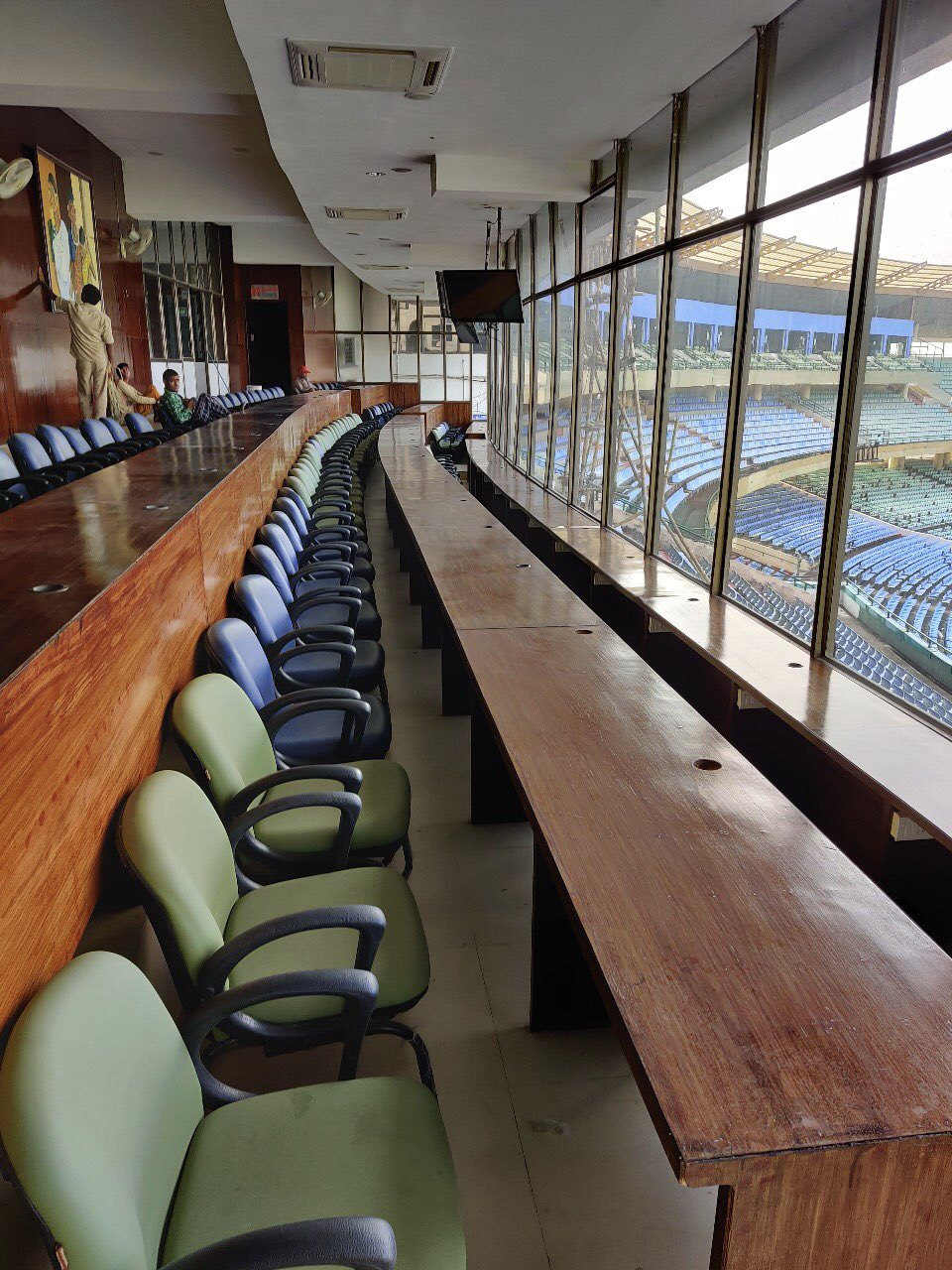
Interior and seat boxes

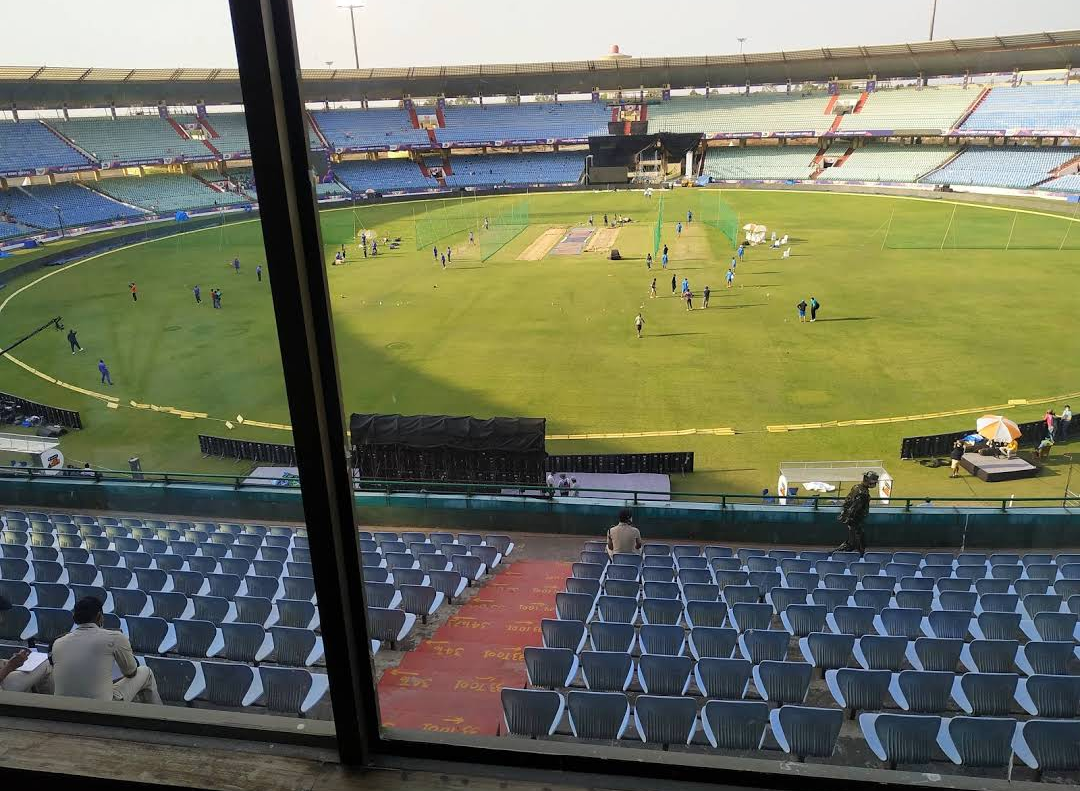
Stadium view from VIP lobby

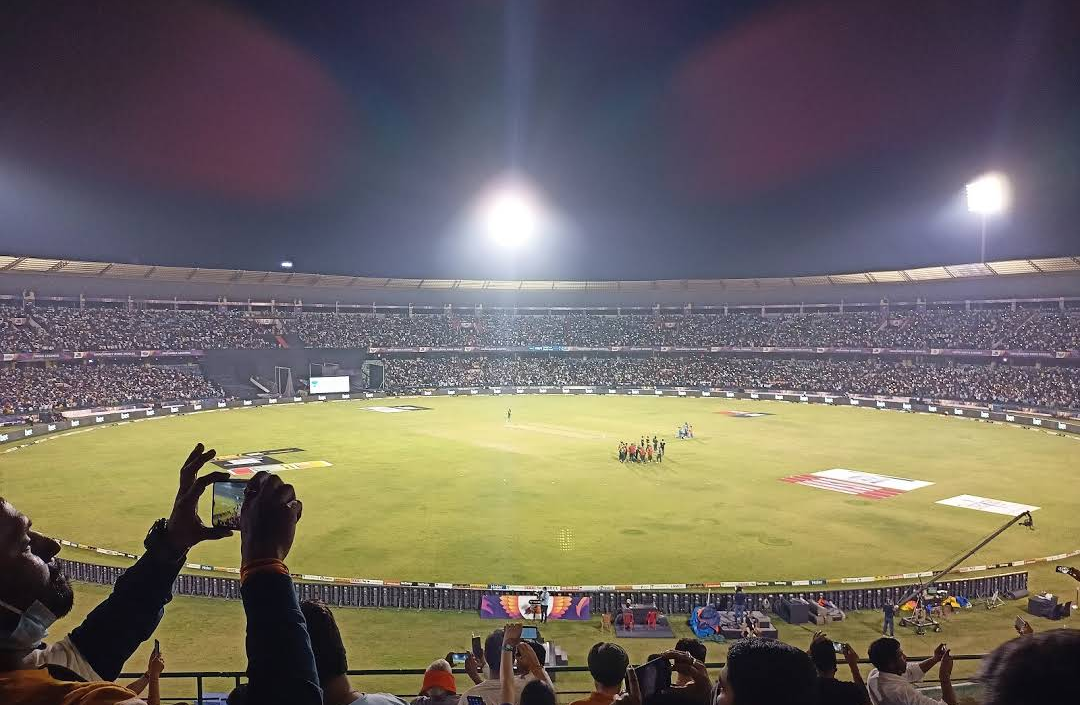
During Road safety world series 2021 Final

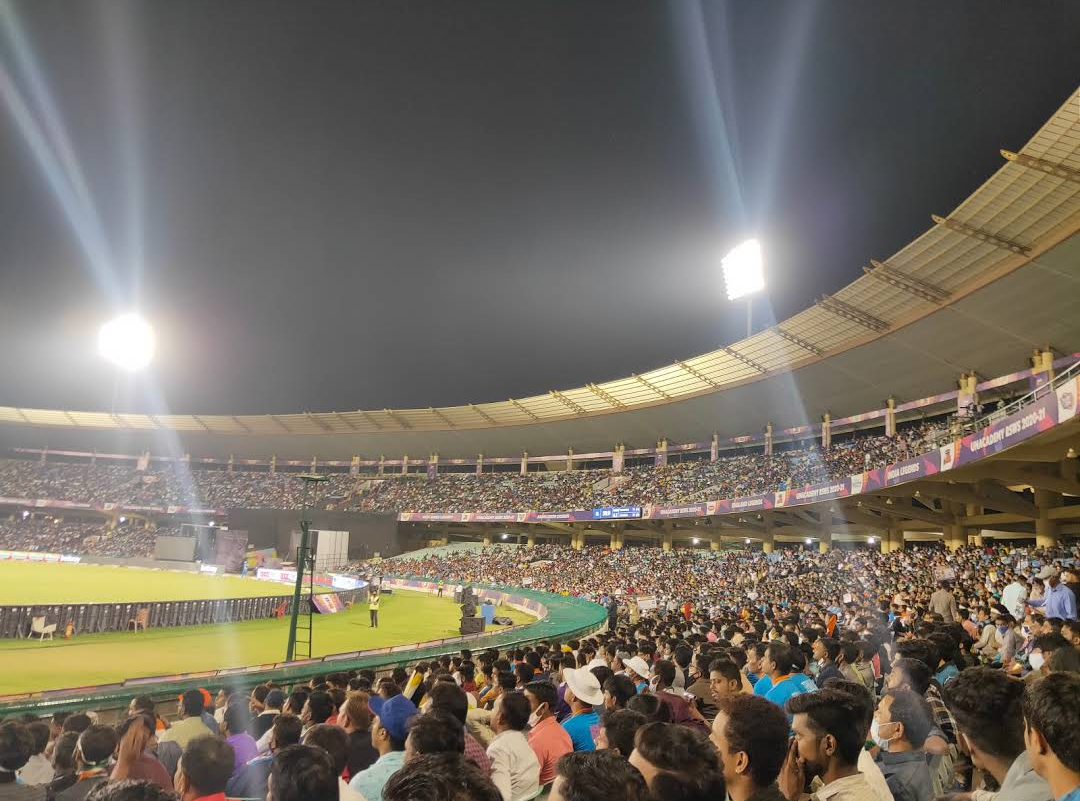
View from lower stand
