= Bharti Fulmali =

Indian cricketer (born 1994)

Personal information
- Full name: Bharti Shrikrushna Fulmali
- Born: 11 October 1994 (age 32); Amravati, Maharashtra, India
- Batting: Right-handed
- Bowling: Right-arm off break

International information
- National side: India
- T20I debut (cap 63): 7 March 2019 v England
- Last T20I: 22 September 2026 v Sri Lanka

Career statistics
Competition	WT20I
Matches	6
Runs scored	72
Batting average	14.40
100s/50s	0/0
Top score	40
Balls bowled	–
Wickets	–
Bowling average	–
5 wickets in innings	–
10 wickets in match	–
Best bowling	–
Catches/stumpings	–/–
Medal record
Women's cricket
Representing India
Asian Games
Gold medal – first place	Aichi–Nagoya 2026
ACC Asia Cup
Winner	2026 UAE
- Source: ESPNcricinfo, 14 June 2026

Bharti Shrikrushna Fulmali (born 11 October 1994) is an Indian cricketer who plays for the Vidarbha women's cricket team. She has been playing cricket since she was 13, making her senior debut at the age of 17. In January 2019, she was named in India Blue's team for the 2018–19 Senior Women's Challenger Trophy.

In February 2019, she was named in India's Women's Twenty20 International (WT20I) squad for their series against England. She was one of two players from Vidarbha women, the other being Komal Zanzad, to be selected for the national team. She made her WT20I debut against England on 7 March 2019.
