= Nuzhat Parween =

Indian cricketer

Personal information
- Full name: Nuzhat Parween
- Born: 5 September 1996 (age 30); Singrauli, Madhya Pradesh, India
- Batting: Right-handed
- Role: Wicket-keeper

International information
- National side: India (2016–2021)
- Only ODI (cap 121): 15 May 2017 v Ireland
- ODI shirt no.: 23
- T20I debut (cap 51): 18 November 2016 v West Indies
- Last T20I: 21 March 2021 v South Africa

Domestic team information
- Years: Team
- 2012/13–2015/16: Madhya Pradesh
- 2017/18–present: Railways
- 2020: Trailblazers
- 2025: RCB

Career statistics
Competition	WODI	WT20I
Matches	1	5
Runs scored	–	1
Batting average	–	1.00
100s/50s	–	0/0
Top score	–	1
Catches/stumpings	1/0	1/1
- Source: ESPNcricinfo, 8 November 2022

Nuzhat Parween (born 5 September 1996) is an Indian cricketer who plays as a wicket-keeper. Domestically, she plays for Railways in the Women's Senior One Day Trophy and Women's Senior T20 Trophy. A multi-talented athlete, she is a former football captain of the Madhya Pradesh under-16 football team, she joined Singrauli's district cricket team in 2011. She made her debut for the Indian national team in November 2016, in a Twenty20 International series against the West Indies.

== Early life ==
Nuzhat is the daughter of Masih Alam and Nasima Begum. She has four siblings - elder brother Aamir Sohail, elder sister Nemat Parween, younger sister Aasiyah Parween and younger brother Ayan Ashraf Sohail.

She was born in Singrauli and used to play domestic cricket for Madhya Pradesh and Central Zone. She now plays for Railways.

Nuzhat played gully cricket with her schoolmates from childhood. Before getting into cricket, she represented Madhya Pradesh in football Nationals and was a gold medalist in state athletics (100 m). Her family was quite supportive of her sports activities, but she faced societal pressure. According to Nuzhat, this changed after her participation in the 2017 World Cup.

According to Nuzhat, her football experience helped her build stamina and strength that have helped her as a wicket-keeper. In 2012, she met Mithali Raj at a tournament, and was inspired to take up cricket.

In her Class 12th, despite missing classes due to practices, she scored 91.8% (Commerce). During her school years, her family took the decision of admitting her to a well-known private school to bring Parween the opportunities she needed.

== Career ==
Nuzhat used to be a football player and was the captain of Madhya Pradesh for their under-16 football team.

Nuzhat is the first Indian player to make it to the national team within just five years.

Her journey in cricket started in 2011 when a women's team for an inter-district tournament was formed in Singrauli, and the administration did not have enough players. Nuzhat who was a junior national football player then, was invited to be part of the team. She started out as a wicket-keeper, in the inter-district cricket competition, representing the Singrauli team. Based on her performance, she was given a special place in Madhya Pradesh's Under-19 Women's Cricket Team.

In 2012–13, based on her performance, she was selected as vice-captain in the Central Zone under-19 women's cricket team.

She took coaching under coach Aril Anthony of the Rewa Divisional Cricket Association. She would travel by bus from Singrauli to Rewa, nine hours by road, for 15–20 days in 3 months to practice under her coach. According to Nuzhat, she would often travel alone and this would cause her family to worry for her security, as travel option in Singrauli are limited.

Nuzhat came to know about her selection for the national team while travelling back to Singrauli from Bhopal by train. She was the youngest player to make it to the World squad after Deepti Sharma. Her jersey number is seven.

She made her Women's One Day International cricket (WODI) debut against Ireland in the 2017 South Africa Quadrangular Series on 15 May 2017.

Parween was part of the Indian squad to reach the final of the 2017 Women's Cricket World Cup where the team lost to England by nine runs.

On her return to Singrauli, she was received at the train station by a big crowd of people, including a group of children, DCA Singrauli members, media, and her family.

She started her Women's Premier League journey with Royal Challengers Bengaluru in 2025.

== Personal interests ==
Her favourite sports movies are the iconic women's hockey film Chak de India and 'M. S. Dhoni: The Untold Story'. She is greatly inspired by Mithali Raj and MS Dhoni. She also follows England wicket-keeper Sarah Taylor. Nuzhat is pursuing a B Com via distance education course, while pursuing cricket dreams. She credits fellow cricketer Haripriya Das, who guided her through her journey.
