= Jintimani Kalita =

Indian cricketer (born 2003)

Personal information
- Full name: Jintimani Nakul Kalita
- Born: 25 December 2003 (age 22); Guwahati, Assam, India
- Batting: Left-handed
- Bowling: Right-arm medium
- Role: Bowler

Domestic team information
- Years: Team
- 2019/20–present: Assam
- 2023–present: Mumbai Indians

Career statistics
Competition	WLA	WT20
Matches	9	16
Runs scored	136	8
Batting average	17.00	8.00
100s/50s	0/1	0/0
Top score	78	3*
Balls bowled	306	78
Wickets	4	2
Bowling average	59.25	53.00
5 wickets in innings	0	0
10 wickets in match	0	0
Best bowling	1/17	1/2
Catches/stumpings	3/–	4/–
- Source: CricketArchive, 4 May 2023

Jintimani Kalita (born 25 December 2003) is an Indian cricketer who plays for Assam and Mumbai Indians. She plays as a right-arm medium bowler and left-handed batter.

At the inaugural Women's Premier League auction held in February 2023, Kalita was acquired by the Mumbai Indians for INR 10 lakhs.

== Early life ==
Kalita was born in Mangaldai, Assam. As a child, she never used to like any new clothes or jewellery. She was fascinated with cricket bats.
