= Komal Zanzad =

Indian cricketer (born 1991)

Personal information
- Full name: Komal Zanzad
- Born: 10 July 1991 (age 35); Nagpur, Maharashtra, India
- Batting: Right-handed
- Bowling: Left-arm medium fast
- Role: Bowler

International information
- National side: India

Domestic team information
- Years: Team
- 2023: Royal Challengers Bangalore
- Source: ESPNcricinfo, 3 March 2019

Komal Zanzad (born 10 July 1991) is an Indian cricketer who plays for the Vidarbha women's cricket team, mainly as a bowler. In December 2018, in the 2018–19 Senior Women's One Day League match against Haryana, she took nine wickets for eight runs. In January 2019, she was named in India Red's team for the 2018–19 Senior Women's Challenger Trophy.

In February 2019, she was named in India's Women's Twenty20 International (WT20I) squad for their series against England. She and Bharti Fulmali were the only players from Vidarbha women selected for the national team. Ahead of the WT20I fixtures, she played for the Indian Board President's Women XI side in a 50-over warm-up match, impressing selectors with three wickets for fourteen runs from her seven overs.
