= Ravi Kalpana =

Indian cricketer (born 1996)

Personal information
- Full name: Ravi Kalpana
- Born: 5 May 1996 (age 30); Krishna, Andhra Pradesh, India
- Batting: Right-handed
- Bowling: Right-arm offbreak
- Role: Wicket-keeper

International information
- National side: India
- ODI debut (cap 115): 28 June 2015 v New Zealand
- Last ODI: 19 February 2016 v Sri Lanka

Domestic team information
- Years: Team
- 2010/11–2015/16: Andhra Pradesh
- 2019: Trailblazers

Career statistics
Competition	WODI
Matches	7
Runs scored	4
Batting average	2.00
100s/50s	0/0
Top score	3
Catches/stumpings	4/1
- Source: ESPNcricinfo, 17 January 2020

Ravi Kalpana (born 5 May 1996) is an Indian cricketer. She started her national-level career as a wicket-keeper and right-handed batter in the India women's national cricket team.

== Personal life ==
Her father is an auto rickshaw driver and Kalpana struggled to convince her parents to not get her married off at an early age: "My most memorable win is so far to convince my family and stop my marriage which could have happened almost abruptly", she said.

Kalpana works for Indian Railways, and lives in Vijayawada. She has B.Com. degree from Nalanda Degree College in Vijayawada.

== Career ==
She started her career by playing for the state team with an allowance of Rs 4000 from the Andhra Pradesh Cricket Association (APCA).

She was initially a part of South Zone division for the Under 16 team. In 2011, she moved on to play for the Under 19 team and then for India Green Team in 2012, to Senior South Zone team in 2014. She was then selected for the Indian Women's Cricket Team in 2015. It was then that she made her international debut in 2015 against New Zealand.
