= Jasia Akhtar =

Indian cricketer (born 1988)

Personal information
- Full name: Jasia Akhtar
- Born: 27 May 1988 (age 38); Shopian, Jammu and Kashmir, India
- Batting: Right-handed
- Bowling: Right-arm medium
- Role: Batter

Domestic team information
- Years: Team
- 2014/15–2020/21: Punjab
- 2019: Trailblazers
- 2021/22–2022/23: Rajasthan
- 2023: Delhi Capitals
- 2023/24–present: Uttarakhand

Career statistics
Competition	WLA	WT20
Matches	51	58
Runs scored	1,424	1,636
Batting average	29.66	32.07
100s/50s	3/7	1/9
Top score	155*	125*
Balls bowled	48	12
Wickets	0	1
Bowling average	–	7.00
5 wickets in innings	0	0
10 wickets in match	0	0
Best bowling	–	1/7
Catches/stumpings	21/–	22/–
- Source: CricketArchive, 8 February 2023

Jasia Akhtar (born 27 May 1988) is an Indian cricketer who currently plays for Uttarakhand. She play as a right-handed batter. She has previously played for Punjab, Rajasthan and Trailblazers.

In September 2017, Akhtar was called up to the national camp for the India women's national cricket team, becoming the first woman cricketer from Jammu and Kashmir to be selected for a national camp.
