= Rajeshwari Gayakwad =

Indian cricketer

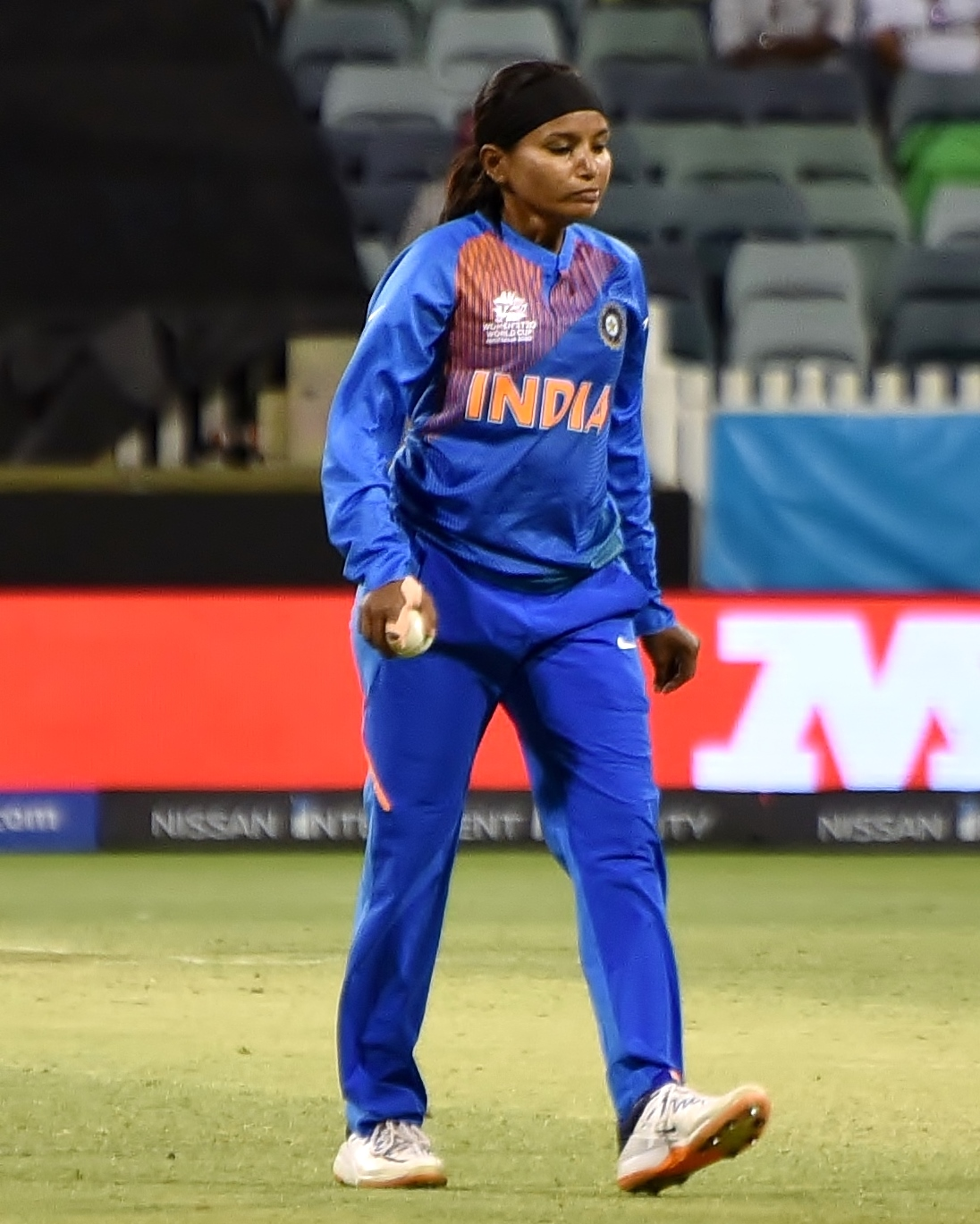
- Gayakwad playing for India during the 2020 ICC Women's T20 World Cup

Personal information
- Full name: Rajeshwari Gayakwad
- Born: 1 June 1991 (age 35); Bijapur, Karnataka, India
- Height: 163 cm (5 ft 4 in)
- Batting: Right-handed
- Bowling: Slow left-arm orthodox
- Role: Bowler

International information
- National side: India (2014–present)
- Test debut (cap 81): 16 November 2014 v South Africa
- Last Test: 30 September 2021 v Australia
- ODI debut (cap 109): 19 January 2014 v Sri Lanka
- Last ODI: 24 September 2022 v England
- ODI shirt no.: 1
- T20I debut (cap 43): 25 January 2014 v Sri Lanka
- Last T20I: 20 February 2023 v Ireland
- T20I shirt no.: 1

Domestic team information
- Years: Team
- 2008/09–2014/15: Karnataka
- 2015/16–present: Railways
- 2018: Supernovas
- 2019–2022: Trailblazers
- 2023: UP Warriorz

Career statistics
Competition	WTest	WODI	WT20I
Matches	2	64	44
Runs scored	–	21	11
Batting average	–	2.33	11.00
100s/50s	–/–	0/0	0/0
Top score	–	5	5*
Balls bowled	474	3,399	911
Wickets	5	99	54
Bowling average	29.00	20.79	17.40
5 wickets in innings	0	1	0
10 wickets in match	0	0	0
Best bowling	4/54	5/15	3/9
Catches/stumpings	1/–	13/–	10/–
Medal record
Representing India
Women's Cricket
World Cup
Runner-up	2017 England and Wales
T20 World Cup
Runner-up	2020 Australia
Asian Games
Gold medal – first place	2022 Hangzhou	Team
Commonwealth Games
Silver medal – second place	2022 Birmingham	Team
Women's Asia Cup
Winner	2022 Bangladesh
- Source: ESPNcricinfo, 19 February 2023

Rajeshwari Gayakwad (born 1 June 1991) is an Indian cricketer. She plays as a slow left-arm orthodox bowler. She made her debut for India in a One Day International against Sri Lanka on 19 January 2014.

== Personal life ==
She started playing serious cricket when she was around 18 years. Her father is her biggest inspiration and got her formal coaching. She start playing for the Karnataka women's cricket team and made her international debut in 2014.

Gayakwad lost her father to a cardiac arrest in 2014, right after her debut international series, against Sri Lanka

After the 2017 Women's Cricket World Cup Final, the water resources minister M. B. Patil gifted her a car worth Rs 5 lakh, which she refused and said that her priority was to get a house for her family. She was at that time the sole breadwinner for her family following the death of her father.

== International cricket ==
Gayakwad was part of the Indian team to reach the final of the 2017 Women's Cricket World Cup where the team lost to England by nine runs. In the same World Cup tournament, she recorded the best bowling figures for India in the Women's Cricket World Cup history (5/15)

In January 2020, she was named in India's squad for the 2020 ICC Women's T20 World Cup in Australia. In January 2022, she was named in India's team for the 2022 Women's Cricket World Cup in New Zealand. In July 2022, she was named in India's team for the cricket tournament at the 2022 Commonwealth Games in Birmingham, England.

== See also ==
- List of IPL Trailblazers cricketers
