= 2026–27 Senior Women's T20 Trophy =

Cricket tournament

2026–27 Women's Senior T20 Trophy
- Dates: 26 October – 20 November 2026
- Administrator: Board of Control for Cricket in India
- Cricket format: Twenty20
- Tournament format(s): Round-robin tournament and Playoff
- Host: India
- Champions: Karnataka (1st title)
- Runners-up: Railways
- Participants: 37
- Matches: 129
- Most runs: Tanisha Singh (489)
- Most wickets: Shreyanka Patil (22)
- Official website: https://www.bcci.tv

The 2026–27 Senior Women's T20 Trophy was the 18th edition of the Women's Senior T20 Trophy, the domestic women's T20 competition in India. It took place from 26 October to 20 November 2026 with 37 teams divided into five groups. The tournament formed part of the 2026–27 Indian domestic cricket season, announced by the Board of Control for Cricket in India (BCCI) in June 2026. Maharashtra were the defending champions, having won their maiden title in the previous edition, but were eliminated in the Super League stage.

Karnataka won the tournament, defeating eleven-time champions Railways by three runs in the final to claim their maiden title. In the Plate competition, Bihar defeated Mizoram by 10 runs in the final to earn promotion to the Elite division for the next season.

== Competition format ==
37 teams competed in the tournament, divided into two groups of eight and three groups of seven. Teams played each other side in their group once in a round-robin format. The top two teams from each group qualified for the knockouts. The teams ranked one to six progressed straight to the quarter-finals, whilst the teams ranked seven to ten played pre-quarter-finals. Matches were played using a Twenty20 format.

The groups worked on a points system with positions within the groups being based on the total points. Points were awarded as follows:

Win: 4 points.
Tie: 2 points.
Loss: 0 points.
No Result/Abandoned: 2 points.

If points in the final table were equal, teams were separated by most wins, then head-to-head record, then Net Run Rate.

== League stage ==
=== Points tables ===
==== Elite Group A ====
Host - Gujarat (Surat)

Team	P	W	L	T	NR	Pts	NRR
Karnataka (Q)	7	7	0	0	0	28	+2.139
Maharashtra (Q)	7	5	2	0	0	20	+1.969
Bengal	7	5	2	0	0	20	+0.977
Goa	7	4	3	0	0	16	+0.916
Chhattisgarh	7	4	3	0	0	16	–0.287
Chandigarh	7	2	5	0	0	8	–1.059
Assam	7	1	6	0	0	4	–1.600
Jammu & Kashmir	7	0	7	0	0	0	–3.175

==== Elite Group B ====
Host - Punjab (New Chandigarh & Mohali)

Team	P	W	L	T	NR	Pts	NRR
Andhra (Q)	7	6	1	0	0	24	+1.241
Baroda (Q)	7	6	1	0	0	24	+0.818
Himachal Pradesh	7	5	2	0	0	20	+0.083
Madhya Pradesh	7	4	3	0	0	16	+0.318
Saurashtra	7	3	4	0	0	12	–0.288
Rajasthan	7	2	5	0	0	8	–0.728
Haryana	7	1	6	0	0	4	–0.405
Odisha	7	1	6	0	0	4	–0.967

==== Elite Group C ====
Host - Uttar Pradesh (Lucknow)

Team	P	W	L	T	NR	Pts	NRR
Railways (Q)	7	6	1	0	0	24	+1.563
Vidarbha (Q)	7	6	1	0	0	24	+1.076
Tamil Nadu	7	5	2	0	0	20	+1.225
Punjab	7	4	3	0	0	16	+0.479
Kerala	7	3	4	0	0	12	+0.205
Gujarat	7	3	4	0	0	12	–0.728
Tripura	7	1	6	0	0	4	–0.737
Sikkim	7	0	7	0	0	0	–3.311

==== Elite Group D ====
Host - Maharashtra (Pune)

Team	P	W	L	T	NR	Pts	NRR
Delhi (Q)	6	5	1	0	0	20	+1.949
Mumbai (Q)	6	5	1	0	0	20	+1.866
Uttarakhand	6	4	2	0	0	16	+1.496
Uttar Pradesh	6	4	2	0	0	16	+0.517
Hyderabad	6	2	4	0	0	8	–1.947
Pondicherry	6	1	5	0	0	4	–1.103
Jharkhand	6	0	6	0	0	0	–1.875

==== Plate Group ====
Host - Nagaland (Sovima)

Team	P	W	L	T	NR	Pts	NRR
Bihar (Q)	5	5	0	0	0	20	+2.003
Mizoram (Q)	5	4	1	0	0	16	+1.801
Meghalaya	5	3	2	0	0	12	+0.200
Manipur	5	2	3	0	0	8	–0.377
Arunachal Pradesh	5	1	4	0	0	4	–1.025
Nagaland	5	0	5	0	0	0	–2.546

- Advanced to the Super League (Elite) / Final (Plate).

=== Fixtures ===
==== Elite Group A ====
Round	No.	Date	Team 1	Team 2	Venue	Result
Round 1	A1	26 October	Chandigarh	Chhattisgarh	CK Pithawala Cricket Ground, Surat	Chhattisgarh won by 7 wickets
Round 1	A2	26 October	Bengal	Karnataka	Lalbhai Contractor Stadium, Surat	Karnataka won by 15 runs
Round 1	A3	26 October	Maharashtra	Assam	Surat	Maharashtra won by 10 wickets
Round 1	A4	26 October	Jammu & Kashmir	Goa	Surat	Goa won by 38 runs
Round 2	A5	27 October	Maharashtra	Karnataka	Surat	Karnataka won by 7 wickets
Round 2	A6	27 October	Jammu & Kashmir	Assam	Surat	Assam won by 7 wickets
Round 2	A7	27 October	Bengal	Chhattisgarh	Surat	Chhattisgarh won by 6 wickets
Round 2	A8	27 October	Goa	Chandigarh	Surat	Goa won by 43 runs
Round 3	A9	29 October	Goa	Karnataka	Surat	Karnataka won by 4 wickets
Round 3	A10	29 October	Chandigarh	Maharashtra	Lalbhai Contractor Stadium, Surat	Maharashtra won by 36 runs
Round 3	A11	29 October	Assam	Chhattisgarh	Surat	Chhattisgarh won by 5 wickets
Round 3	A12	29 October	Jammu & Kashmir	Bengal	Surat	Bengal won by 7 wickets
Round 4	A13	31 October	Chandigarh	Assam	CK Pithawala Cricket Ground, Surat	Chandigarh won by 34 runs
Round 4	A14	31 October	Jammu & Kashmir	Karnataka	Surat	Karnataka won by 117 runs
Round 4	A15	31 October	Goa	Bengal	CK Pithawala Cricket Ground, Surat	Bengal won by 8 wickets
Round 4	A16	31 October	Maharashtra	Chhattisgarh	Surat	Maharashtra won by 5 wickets
Round 5	A17	2 November	Maharashtra	Bengal	CK Pithawala Cricket Ground, Surat	Bengal won by 7 runs
Round 5	A18	2 November	Goa	Chhattisgarh	Surat	Goa won by 8 runs
Round 5	A19	2 November	Jammu & Kashmir	Chandigarh	CK Pithawala Cricket Ground, Surat	Chandigarh won by 5 wickets
Round 5	A20	2 November	Assam	Karnataka	Surat	Karnataka won by 55 runs
Round 6	A21	4 November	Goa	Assam	Surat	Goa won by 6 wickets
Round 6	A22	4 November	Chandigarh	Bengal	Lalbhai Contractor Stadium, Surat	Bengal won by 72 runs
Round 6	A23	4 November	Jammu & Kashmir	Maharashtra	Surat	Maharashtra won by 141 runs
Round 6	A24	4 November	Karnataka	Chhattisgarh	Surat	Karnataka won by 52 runs
Round 7	A25	6 November	Bengal	Assam	Surat	Bengal won by 6 wickets
Round 7	A26	6 November	Chandigarh	Karnataka	CK Pithawala Cricket Ground, Surat	Karnataka won by 7 wickets
Round 7	A27	6 November	Goa	Maharashtra	Surat	Maharashtra won by 12 runs
Round 7	A28	6 November	Jammu & Kashmir	Chhattisgarh	Surat	Chhattisgarh won by 20 runs

==== Elite Group B ====
Round	No.	Date	Team 1	Team 2	Venue	Result
Round 1	B1	26 October	Himachal Pradesh	Madhya Pradesh	Maharaja Yadavindra Singh International Cricket Stadium, New Chandigarh	Himachal Pradesh won by 6 wickets
Round 1	B2	26 October	Baroda	Saurashtra	I.S. Bindra PCA Stadium, Mohali	Baroda won by 15 runs
Round 1	B3	26 October	Rajasthan	Haryana	Mohali	Haryana won by 7 wickets
Round 1	B4	26 October	Andhra	Odisha	New Chandigarh	Andhra won by 9 wickets
Round 2	B5	27 October	Rajasthan	Saurashtra	New Chandigarh	Rajasthan won by 8 runs
Round 2	B6	27 October	Andhra	Haryana	I.S. Bindra PCA Stadium, Mohali	Andhra won by 2 runs
Round 2	B7	27 October	Baroda	Madhya Pradesh	Maharaja Yadavindra Singh International Cricket Stadium, New Chandigarh	Baroda won by 6 wickets
Round 2	B8	27 October	Odisha	Himachal Pradesh	I.S. Bindra PCA Stadium, Mohali	Himachal Pradesh won by 4 wickets
Round 3	B9	29 October	Odisha	Saurashtra	Mohali	Saurashtra won by 6 runs
Round 3	B10	29 October	Himachal Pradesh	Rajasthan	New Chandigarh	Himachal Pradesh won by 6 wickets
Round 3	B11	29 October	Haryana	Madhya Pradesh	Mohali	Madhya Pradesh won by 6 wickets
Round 3	B12	29 October	Andhra	Baroda	New Chandigarh	Andhra won by 5 wickets
Round 4	B13	31 October	Himachal Pradesh	Haryana	Mohali	Match tied (Himachal Pradesh won the Super Over)
Round 4	B14	31 October	Andhra	Saurashtra	New Chandigarh	Andhra won by 7 wickets
Round 4	B15	31 October	Odisha	Baroda	Mohali	Baroda won by 7 wickets
Round 4	B16	31 October	Rajasthan	Madhya Pradesh	New Chandigarh	Madhya Pradesh won by 7 wickets
Round 5	B17	2 November	Rajasthan	Baroda	Mohali	Baroda won by 60 runs
Round 5	B18	2 November	Odisha	Madhya Pradesh	New Chandigarh	Madhya Pradesh won by 7 wickets
Round 5	B19	2 November	Himachal Pradesh	Andhra	Mohali	Andhra won by 9 wickets
Round 5	B20	2 November	Haryana	Saurashtra	I.S. Bindra PCA Stadium, Mohali	Saurashtra won by 5 wickets
Round 6	B21	4 November	Odisha	Haryana	Mohali	Odisha won by 2 runs
Round 6	B22	4 November	Himachal Pradesh	Baroda	New Chandigarh	Baroda won by 7 wickets
Round 6	B23	4 November	Andhra	Rajasthan	Mohali	Andhra won by 5 wickets
Round 6	B24	4 November	Saurashtra	Madhya Pradesh	New Chandigarh	Saurashtra won by 7 wickets
Round 7	B25	6 November	Baroda	Haryana	Mohali	Baroda won by 64 runs
Round 7	B26	6 November	Himachal Pradesh	Saurashtra	New Chandigarh	Himachal Pradesh won by 7 wickets
Round 7	B27	6 November	Odisha	Rajasthan	Mohali	Rajasthan won by 10 wickets
Round 7	B28	6 November	Andhra	Madhya Pradesh	New Chandigarh	Madhya Pradesh won by 9 wickets

==== Elite Group C ====
Round	No.	Date	Team 1	Team 2	Venue	Result
Round 1	C1	26 October	Railways	Tripura	Lucknow	Railways won by 2 wickets
Round 1	C2	26 October	Tamil Nadu	Punjab	Lucknow	Tamil Nadu won by 47 runs
Round 1	C3	26 October	Vidarbha	Gujarat	Lucknow	Vidarbha won by 8 wickets
Round 1	C4	26 October	Sikkim	Kerala	Ekana Cricket Stadium, Lucknow	Kerala won by 6 wickets
Round 2	C5	27 October	Vidarbha	Punjab	Ekana Cricket Stadium Ground B, Lucknow	Vidarbha won by 5 wickets
Round 2	C6	27 October	Sikkim	Gujarat	Ekana Cricket Stadium, Lucknow	Gujarat won by 8 wickets
Round 2	C7	27 October	Tamil Nadu	Tripura	Lucknow	Tamil Nadu won by 32 runs
Round 2	C8	27 October	Kerala	Railways	Lucknow	Railways won by 8 wickets
Round 3	C9	29 October	Kerala	Punjab	Lucknow	Punjab won by 1 run
Round 3	C10	29 October	Railways	Vidarbha	Lucknow	Railways won by 8 wickets
Round 3	C11	29 October	Gujarat	Tripura	Lucknow	Gujarat won by 8 wickets
Round 3	C12	29 October	Sikkim	Tamil Nadu	Lucknow	Tamil Nadu won by 8 wickets
Round 4	C13	31 October	Railways	Gujarat	Lucknow	Railways won by 23 runs
Round 4	C14	31 October	Sikkim	Punjab	Lucknow	Punjab won by 8 wickets
Round 4	C15	31 October	Kerala	Tamil Nadu	Lucknow	Kerala won by 3 wickets
Round 4	C16	31 October	Vidarbha	Tripura	Lucknow	Vidarbha won by 7 wickets
Round 5	C17	2 November	Vidarbha	Tamil Nadu	Lucknow	Vidarbha won by 1 run
Round 5	C18	2 November	Kerala	Tripura	Lucknow	Kerala won by 1 run
Round 5	C19	2 November	Sikkim	Railways	Lucknow	Railways won by 102 runs
Round 5	C20	2 November	Gujarat	Punjab	Lucknow	Punjab won by 66 runs
Round 6	C21	4 November	Kerala	Gujarat	Lucknow	Gujarat won by 8 wickets
Round 6	C22	4 November	Railways	Tamil Nadu	Lucknow	Tamil Nadu won by 2 runs
Round 6	C23	4 November	Sikkim	Vidarbha	Lucknow	Vidarbha won by 9 wickets
Round 6	C24	4 November	Punjab	Tripura	Lucknow	Punjab won by 5 wickets
Round 7	C25	6 November	Tamil Nadu	Gujarat	Lucknow	Tamil Nadu won by 67 runs
Round 7	C26	6 November	Railways	Punjab	Lucknow	Railways won by 8 wickets
Round 7	C27	6 November	Kerala	Vidarbha	Lucknow	Vidarbha won by 9 wickets
Round 7	C28	6 November	Sikkim	Tripura	Lucknow	Tripura won by 7 wickets

==== Elite Group D ====
Round	No.	Date	Team 1	Team 2	Venue	Result
Round 1	D1	26 October	Jharkhand	Mumbai	Pune	Mumbai won by 94 runs
Round 1	D2	26 October	Delhi	Uttarakhand	Pune	Delhi won by 20 runs
Round 1	D3	26 October	Hyderabad	Uttar Pradesh	MCA Ground 2, Gahunje, Pune	Uttar Pradesh won by 12 runs
Round 2	D4	27 October	Hyderabad	Mumbai	MCA Ground 2, Gahunje, Pune	Mumbai won by 8 wickets
Round 2	D5	27 October	Pondicherry	Uttar Pradesh	Pune	Uttar Pradesh won by 54 runs
Round 2	D6	27 October	Jharkhand	Uttarakhand	Pune	Uttarakhand won by 58 runs
Round 3	D7	29 October	Delhi	Hyderabad	Pune	Delhi won by 108 runs
Round 3	D8	29 October	Uttarakhand	Mumbai	Pune	Uttarakhand won by 14 runs
Round 3	D9	29 October	Pondicherry	Jharkhand	Pune	Pondicherry won by 11 runs (VJD method)
Round 4	D10	31 October	Hyderabad	Jharkhand	Pune	Hyderabad won by 6 wickets
Round 4	D11	31 October	Pondicherry	Uttarakhand	Pune	Uttarakhand won by 6 wickets
Round 4	D12	31 October	Delhi	Uttar Pradesh	Pune	Delhi won by 27 runs
Round 5	D13	2 November	Delhi	Pondicherry	Pune	Delhi won by 33 runs
Round 5	D14	2 November	Uttar Pradesh	Mumbai	Pune	Mumbai won by 29 runs
Round 5	D15	2 November	Hyderabad	Uttarakhand	Pune	Uttarakhand won by 89 runs
Round 6	D16	4 November	Jharkhand	Uttar Pradesh	Pune	Uttar Pradesh won by 36 runs
Round 6	D17	4 November	Pondicherry	Hyderabad	Pune	Hyderabad won by 7 wickets
Round 6	D18	4 November	Delhi	Mumbai	Pune	Mumbai won by 7 wickets
Round 7	D19	6 November	Pondicherry	Mumbai	Pune	Mumbai won by 83 runs
Round 7	D20	6 November	Uttarakhand	Uttar Pradesh	Pune	Uttar Pradesh won by 10 wickets
Round 7	D21	6 November	Jharkhand	Delhi	Pune	Delhi won by 6 wickets

==== Plate Group ====
Round	No.	Date	Team 1	Team 2	Venue	Result
Round 1	P1	26 October	Manipur	Bihar	Nagaland Cricket Stadium, Sovima	Bihar won by 10 wickets
Round 1	P2	26 October	Mizoram	Nagaland	Sovima	Mizoram won by 6 wickets
Round 1	P3	26 October	Meghalaya	Arunachal Pradesh	Sovima	Meghalaya won by 8 wickets
Round 2	P4	27 October	Bihar	Arunachal Pradesh	Sovima	Bihar won by 7 wickets
Round 2	P5	27 October	Mizoram	Meghalaya	Sovima	Mizoram won by 15 runs
Round 2	P6	27 October	Manipur	Nagaland	Sovima	Manipur won by 5 wickets
Round 3	P7	29 October	Bihar	Meghalaya	Sovima	Bihar won by 24 runs
Round 3	P8	29 October	Mizoram	Manipur	Sovima	Mizoram won by 7 wickets
Round 3	P9	29 October	Arunachal Pradesh	Nagaland	Sovima	Arunachal Pradesh won by 18 runs
Round 4	P10	31 October	Bihar	Mizoram	Sovima	Bihar won by 14 runs
Round 4	P11	31 October	Meghalaya	Nagaland	Sovima	Meghalaya won by 9 wickets
Round 4	P12	31 October	Manipur	Arunachal Pradesh	Sovima	Manipur won by 6 wickets
Round 5	P13	2 November	Bihar	Nagaland	Sovima	Bihar won by 68 runs
Round 5	P14	2 November	Mizoram	Arunachal Pradesh	Sovima	Mizoram won by 42 runs
Round 5	P15	2 November	Meghalaya	Manipur	Sovima	Meghalaya won by 11 runs

===== Plate Final =====
Date	Team 1	Team 2	Venue	Result
4 November	Bihar (116/7)	Mizoram (106/9)	Nagaland Cricket Stadium, Sovima	Bihar won by 10 runs

== Super League ==
The top two teams from each of the four Elite groups advanced to the Super League stage in Ahmedabad, where they were divided into two groups of four teams each. The winners of each Super League group advance to the Final on 20 November 2026.

=== Points tables ===
==== Super League Group A ====
Host - Gujarat (Ahmedabad)

Team	P	W	L	T	NR	Pts	NRR
Railways	3	3	0	0	0	12	+0.831
Mumbai	3	2	1	0	0	8	+1.093
Maharashtra	3	1	2	0	0	4	+0.478
Andhra	3	0	3	0	0	0	−2.402

==== Super League Group B ====
Host - Gujarat (Ahmedabad)

Team	P	W	L	T	NR	Pts	NRR
Karnataka	3	2	1	0	0	8	+2.066
Baroda	3	2	1	0	0	8	−0.396
Delhi	3	1	2	0	0	4	−0.136
Vidarbha	3	1	2	0	0	4	−1.468

- Qualified for finals

=== Fixtures ===
==== Super League Group A ====
Round	No.	Date	Team 1	Team 2	Venue	Result
Round 1	SLA1	14 November	Maharashtra; 161/6 (20.0)	Andhra; 113/9 (20.0)	Gujarat College Cricket Ground 'A', Ahmedabad	Maharashtra won by 48 runs
Round 1	SLA2	14 November	Railways; 161/7 (19.5)	Mumbai; 157/9 (20.0)	Gujarat College Cricket Ground 'A', Ahmedabad	Railways Women won by 3 wickets
Round 2	SLA3	16 November	Maharashtra; 163/8 (20.0)	Railways; 173/4 (20.0)	Narendra Modi Stadium Ground 'B', Ahmedabad	Railways Women won by 10 runs
Round 2	SLA4	16 November	Andhra; 143/6 (20.0)	Mumbai; 149/3 (13.4)	Ahmedabad	Mumbai Women won by 7 wickets
Round 3	SLA5	18 November	Andhra; 108/6 (20.0)	Railways; 112/2 (16.1)	Gujarat College Cricket Ground 'A', Ahmedabad	Railways Women won by 8 wickets
Round 3	SLA6	18 November	Maharashtra; 143/7 (20.0)	Mumbai; 145/6 (19.0)	Gujarat College Cricket Ground 'A', Ahmedabad	Mumbai Women won by 4 wickets

==== Super League Group B ====
Round	No.	Date	Team 1	Team 2	Venue	Result
Round 1	SLB1	14 November	Vidarbha; 172/2 (17.3)	Delhi; 169/5 (20.0)	Narendra Modi Stadium Ground 'B', Ahmedabad	Vidarbha won by 8 wickets
Round 1	SLB2	14 November	Karnataka; 140/5 (13.3)	Baroda; 137 (19.4)	Narendra Modi Stadium Ground 'B', Ahmedabad	Karnataka Women won by 5 wickets
Round 2	SLB3	16 November	Karnataka; 193/7 (20.0)	Vidarbha; 108/8 (20.0)	Gujarat College Cricket Ground 'A', Ahmedabad	Karnataka Women won by 85 runs
Round 2	SLB4	16 November	Baroda; 190/4 (19.0)	Delhi; 189/4 (20.0)	Ahmedabad	Baroda Women won by 6 wickets
Round 3	SLB5	18 November	Karnataka; 175/8 (20.0)	Delhi; 176/5 (17.0)	Narendra Modi Stadium Ground 'B', Ahmedabad	Delhi Women won by 5 wickets
Round 3	SLB6	18 November	Baroda; 125/7 (17.2)	Vidarbha; 124/9 (20.0)	Narendra Modi Stadium Ground 'B', Ahmedabad	Baroda Women won by 3 wickets

== Final ==
Date	Team 1	Team 2	Venue	Result
20 November	Railways	Karnataka	Narendra Modi Stadium Ground 'B', Ahmedabad	Karnataka won by 3 runs Scorecard
