= 2023–24 Senior Women's One Day Trophy =

Domestic cricket tournament

- Dates: 4 – 26 January 2024
- Administrator(s): BCCI
- Cricket format: List A
- Tournament format(s): Round-robin and Playoffs
- Host(s): India
- Champions: Railways (15th title)
- Runners-up: Uttarakhand
- Participants: 37
- Matches: 128
- Most runs: Shweta Sehrawat (462)
- Most wickets: Priya Mishra (23)
- Official website: BCCI

The 2023–24 Senior Women's One Day Trophy was the 18th edition of the women's List A cricket competition in India. It took place from 4 to 26 January 2024, with 37 teams competing in five round-robin groups. Railways won the tournament, their fifteenth title and fourth in a row, beating Uttarakhand in the final.

== Competition format ==
37 teams competed in the tournament, divided into two groups of eight and three groups of seven, playing each other side in their group once. The teams ranked one to six progressed straight to the quarter-finals, whilst the teams ranked seven to ten played pre-quarter-finals.

The groups worked on a points system with positions within the groups being based on the total points. Points were awarded as follows:

Win: 4 points.
Tie: 2 points.
Loss: 0 points.
No Result/Abandoned: 2 points.

If points in the final table were equal, teams were separated by most wins, then head-to-head record, then Net Run Rate.

== League stage ==
=== Points tables ===
==== Group A ====
Team	P	W	L	T	NR	Pts	NRR
Railways (Q)	7	5	0	0	2	24	+2.537
Tamil Nadu (Q)	7	4	1	0	2	20	+0.901
Madhya Pradesh	7	3	2	0	2	16	+1.515
Assam	7	3	2	0	2	16	+0.124
Saurashtra	7	2	3	0	2	12	–0.052
Chandigarh	7	2	3	0	2	12	–0.268
Odisha	7	1	4	0	2	8	–0.486
Manipur	7	0	5	0	2	0	–4.340

==== Group B ====
Team	P	W	L	T	NR	Pts	NRR
Tripura (Q)	7	6	1	0	0	24	+0.923
Vidarbha (Q)	7	5	2	0	0	20	+0.507
Gujarat	7	5	2	0	0	20	+0.621
Pondicherry	7	4	3	0	0	16	+0.891
Karnataka	7	4	3	0	0	16	+0.820
Jharkhand	7	3	4	0	0	12	+0.101
Mizoram	7	1	6	0	0	0	–2.441
Bihar	7	0	7	0	0	0	–1.630

==== Group C ====
Team	P	W	L	T	NR	Pts	NRR
Rajasthan (Q)	6	5	1	0	0	20	+0.683
Maharashtra (Q)	6	5	1	0	0	20	+1.869
Haryana	6	4	2	0	0	16	+0.958
Goa	6	4	2	0	0	16	+1.527
Uttar Pradesh	6	2	4	0	0	8	+0.228
Jammu and Kashmir	6	1	5	0	0	4	–1.121
Meghalaya	6	0	6	0	0	0	–4.207

==== Group D ====
Team	P	W	L	T	NR	Pts	NRR
Uttarakhand (Q)	6	6	0	0	0	24	+1.921
Mumbai (Q)	6	4	2	0	0	16	+1.631
Punjab	6	4	2	0	0	16	+0.626
Hyderabad	6	3	3	0	0	12	+0.561
Bengal	6	2	4	0	0	8	+0.958
Chhattisgarh	6	2	4	0	0	8	–0.127
Arunachal Pradesh	6	0	6	0	0	0	–6.138

==== Group E ====
Team	P	W	L	T	NR	Pts	NRR
Delhi (Q)	6	6	0	0	0	24	+3.951
Himachal Pradesh (Q)	6	4	2	0	0	16	+0.691
Kerala	6	4	2	0	0	16	+1.799
Andhra	6	3	3	0	0	12	+0.608
Baroda	6	3	3	0	0	12	+0.762
Nagaland	6	1	5	0	0	4	–3.936
Sikkim	6	0	6	0	0	0	–4.749

Source: BCCI

== Knockout stages ==
Pre-quarter-finals
B2	Vidarbha	77/2
E2	Himachal Pradesh	76
A2	Tamil Nadu	109
D2	Mumbai	85

Quarter-finals
B2	Vidarbha	28
E1	Delhi	29/2
A1	Railways	66/1
C1	Rajasthan	64
D1	Uttarakhand	249
A2	Tamil Nadu	143/7
B1	Tripura	112
C2	Maharashtra	116/2

Semi-finals
E1	Delhi	228/9
A1	Railways	236/5
D1	Uttarakhand	201/7
C2	Maharashtra	193

Final
D1	Uttarakhand	84
A1	Railways	88/2

=== Final ===
26 January 2024
Scorecard

Uttarakhand; 84 (32.1 overs)	v	Railways; 88/2 (22.1 overs)
Sarika Koli 25 (35); Rajeshwari Gayakwad 2/4 (5.1 overs)		Sabbhineni Meghana 46* (48); Anjali Kathait 1/13 (4.1 overs)

Railways won by 8 wickets
Infipro Sports Club Ground, Vadodara
Umpires: Vrinda Rathi and Gayathri Venugopalan
Player of the match: Sneh Rana (Railways)

- Uttarakhand won the toss and elected to bat.

== Statistics ==
=== Most runs ===
Player	Team	Matches	Innings	Runs	Average	HS	100s	50s
Shweta Sehrawat	Delhi	8	8	462	66.00	242	1	2
Pratika Rawal	Delhi	8	7	411	68.50	141	2	2
Punam Raut	Uttarakhand	9	9	387	48.38	128*	1	3
Tejal Hasabnis	Maharashtra	8	8	362	51.71	105	2	2
Tanisha Singh	Delhi	8	7	359	71.80	107	1	3

Source: BCCI

=== Most wickets ===
Player	Team	Overs	Wickets	Average	5w
Priya Mishra	Delhi	58.4	23	9.86	0
Shradda Pokharkar	Maharashtra	57.3	18	11.72	1
Komal Zanzad	Vidarbha	49.3	18	12.72	1
Vinaya Surendran	Kerala	49.3	17	10.70	1
Krishna Patel	Gujarat	64.1	17	11.70	0

Source: BCCI
