= 2024–25 Senior Women's One Day Trophy =

2024–25 Women's Senior One Day Trophy
- Dates: 4 – 30 December 2024
- Administrator: Board of Control for Cricket in India
- Cricket format: List A
- Tournament format(s): Round-robin and playoffs
- Host: India
- Champions: Madhya Pradesh
- Runners-up: Bengal
- Participants: 37
- Matches: 128

The 2024–25 Women's Senior One Day Trophy was the nineteenth edition of the Women's Senior One Day Trophy, a women's List A cricket competition in India., taking place from 4 to 30 December 2024. 37 teams competed in the tournament, divided into two groups of eight and three groups of seven, playing each other side in their group once. The tournament formed part of India's 2024–25 domestic home season, announced by the Board of Control for Cricket in India (BCCI) in June 2024. Railways were the defending champions, but for only the 3rd time in the competition's history, Railways were absent from the final, with Madhya Pradesh beating Bengal to claim their first title.

== Competition format ==
37 teams competed in the tournament, divided into two groups of eight and three groups of seven, playing each other side in their group once. The teams ranked one to six progressed straight to the quarter-finals, whilst the teams ranked seven to ten played pre-quarter-finals.

The groups worked on a points system with positions within the groups being based on the total points. Points were awarded as follows:

Win: 4 points.
Tie: 2 points.
Loss: 0 points.
No Result/Abandoned: 2 points.

If points in the final table were equal, teams were separated by most wins, then head-to-head record, then Net Run Rate.

== League stage ==
=== Points tables ===
==== Group A ====
Team	P	W	L	T	NR	Pts	NRR
Railways (Q)	7	7	0	0	0	28	+1.951
Jammu and Kashmir (Q)	7	6	1	0	0	24	+1.557
Andhra	7	5	2	0	0	20	+0.921
Gujarat	7	3	4	0	0	12	+0.878
Himachal Pradesh	7	3	4	0	0	12	+0.743
Baroda	7	3	4	0	0	12	–0.169
Mizoram	7	1	6	0	0	4	–3.489
Sikkim	7	0	7	0	0	0	–2.833

==== Group B ====
Team	P	W	L	T	NR	Pts	NRR
Mumbai (Q)	7	6	1	0	0	24	+2.152
Uttarakhand (Q)	7	5	2	0	0	20	+1.227
Hyderabad	7	5	2	0	0	20	+1.106
Odisha	7	4	3	0	0	16	+0.751
Kerala	7	4	3	0	0	16	+0.919
Assam	7	3	4	0	0	12	–0.178
Arunachal Pradesh	7	1	6	0	0	4	–2.605
Nagaland	7	0	7	0	0	0	–3.722

==== Group C ====
Team	P	W	L	T	NR	Pts	NRR
Madhya Pradesh (Q)	6	5	1	0	0	20	+1.701
Delhi (Q)	6	5	1	0	0	20	+2.022
Jharkhand	6	4	2	0	0	16	+1.153
Chhattisgarh	6	3	3	0	0	12	–0.023
Goa	6	3	3	0	0	12	–0.407
Tamil Nadu	6	1	5	0	0	4	–0.009
Manipur	6	0	6	0	0	0	–4.187

==== Group D ====
Team	P	W	L	T	NR	Pts	NRR
Haryana (Q)	6	4	2	0	0	16	+1.676
Maharashtra (Q)	6	4	2	0	0	16	+1.427
Vidarbha	6	4	2	0	0	16	+0.803
Uttar Pradesh	6	4	2	0	0	16	+0.649
Punjab	6	4	2	0	0	16	+0.607
Saurashtra	6	1	5	0	0	4	–2.669
Bihar	6	0	6	0	0	0	–2.226

==== Group E ====
Team	P	W	L	T	NR	Pts	NRR
Bengal (Q)	6	5	1	0	0	20	+1.379
Karnataka (Q)	6	5	1	0	0	20	+2.389
Rajasthan	6	4	2	0	0	16	+0.610
Chandigarh	6	3	3	0	0	12	–0.213
Tripura	6	3	3	0	0	12	+0.039
Pondicherry	6	1	5	0	0	4	–1.256
Meghalaya	6	0	6	0	0	0	–2.839

Source: BCCI

== Knockout stages ==
Pre-quarter-finals
E2	Karnataka	210
D2	Maharashtra	212/7
C2	Delhi	275/4
B2	Uttarakhand	274/8

Quarter-finals
A1	Railways	256/7
D2	Maharashtra	254
E1	Bengal	390/5
D1	Haryana	389/5
B1	Mumbai	321/7 23/0
C2	Delhi	321/5 17/0
C1	Madhya Pradesh	274/8
A2	Jammu and Kashmir	192/8

Semi-finals
A1	Railways	300/5
E1	Bengal	301/4
B1	Mumbai	161
C1	Madhya Pradesh	165/3

Final
E1	Bengal	136
C1	Madhya Pradesh	139/3

=== Final ===
30 December 2024
Scorecard

Bengal; 136 (38.2 overs)	v	Madhya Pradesh; 139/3 (34.4 overs)
Priyanka Bala 42 (74); Kranti Gaud 4/25 (9.0 overs)		Anushka Sharma 69* (102); Titas Sadhu 3/32 (8.0 overs)

Madhya Pradesh won by 7 wickets
Niranjan Shah Stadium, Rajkot
Umpires: K. Nidhin and Gayathri Venugopalan
Player of the match: Kranti Gaud (Madhya Pradesh)

- Madhya Pradesh won the toss and elected to field.
