= 2021–22 Senior Women's T20 Trophy =

Domestic cricket competition

- Dates: 15 April – 4 May 2022
- Administrator: BCCI
- Cricket format: Twenty20
- Tournament format(s): Round-robin tournament and Playoff
- Host: India
- Champions: Railways (10th title)
- Runners-up: Maharashtra
- Participants: 37
- Matches: 142
- Most runs: Kiran Navgire (525)
- Most wickets: Aarti Kedar (13)
- Official website: bcci.tv

The 2021–22 Senior Women's T20 Trophy was the 13th edition of the Senior Women's T20 Trophy, the domestic women's T20 competition in India. The tournament was originally scheduled to be played from 19 March to 11 April 2022, but was postponed on 5 January 2022 due to rising COVID-19 cases in the country. The tournament took place from 15 April to 4 May 2022, with 37 teams divided into six groups. In the first round of the tournament, Nagaland player Kiran Navgire scored an unbeaten 162 against Arunachal Pradesh. Railways, the defending champions, beat Maharashtra in the final to win their tenth T20 title.

== Competition format ==
37 teams competed in the tournament, divided into the Elite Group and the Plate Group, with the teams in the Elite Group further divided into Groups A, B, C, D and E. Each group took place in one host city, under COVID-19 protocols. The top two teams in each Elite Group progressed to the knockout stages, along with the top team from the Plate Group. The five Elite Group winners progressed straight to the quarter-finals, whilst the remaining six teams competed in the pre-quarter-finals.

The groups worked on a points system with positions within the groups based on the total points. Points were awarded as follows:

Win: 4 points.
Tie: 2 points.
Loss: 0 points.
No Result/Abandoned: 2 points.

If points in the final table were equal, teams were separated by most wins, then head-to-head record, then Net Run Rate.

== League stage ==
=== Points tables ===
==== Elite Group A ====
Host - Puducherry

Team	P	W	L	T	NR	Pts	NRR
Maharashtra (Q)	5	4	1	0	0	16	+1.210
Kerala (Q)	5	4	1	0	0	16	+1.144
Rajasthan	5	3	2	0	0	12	+0.297
Andhra	5	3	2	0	0	12	+1.752
Hyderabad	5	1	4	0	0	4	–0.028
Meghalaya	5	0	5	0	0	0	–4.609

==== Elite Group B ====
Host - Kerala (Trivandrum)

Team	P	W	L	T	NR	Pts	NRR
Odisha (Q)	5	5	0	0	0	20	+1.661
Jharkhand (Q)	5	4	1	0	0	16	+1.090
Tamil Nadu	5	3	2	0	0	12	+0.533
Tripura	5	2	3	0	0	8	–0.049
Chhattisgarh	5	1	4	0	0	4	–0.887
Bihar	5	0	5	0	0	0	–2.077

==== Elite Group C ====
Host - Saurashtra (Rajkot)

Team	P	W	L	T	NR	Pts	NRR
Railways (Q)	5	5	0	0	0	20	+1.461
Himachal Pradesh (Q)	5	3	2	0	0	12	–0.455
Delhi	5	3	2	0	0	12	+0.411
Madhya Pradesh	5	2	3	0	0	8	+0.031
Chandigarh	5	1	4	0	0	4	–0.505
Karnataka	5	1	4	0	0	4	–0.874

==== Elite Group D ====
Host - Punjab (Mohali)

Team	P	W	L	T	NR	Pts	NRR
Baroda (Q)	5	4	1	0	0	16	+0.673
Goa (Q)	5	4	1	0	0	16	+0.129
Uttar Pradesh	5	3	2	0	0	12	+1.144
Vidarbha	5	2	3	0	0	8	+0.250
Gujarat	5	1	4	0	0	4	–0.484
Uttarakhand	5	1	4	0	0	4	–1.768

==== Elite Group E ====
Host - Jharkhand (Ranchi)

Team	P	W	L	T	NR	Pts	NRR
Mumbai (Q)	5	4	1	0	0	16	+2.538
Haryana (Q)	5	4	1	0	0	16	+1.074
Bengal	5	3	2	0	0	12	+0.509
Punjab	5	3	2	0	0	12	+0.258
Assam	5	1	4	0	0	4	–1.905
Saurashtra	5	0	5	0	0	0	–1.840

==== Plate Group ====
Host - Assam (Guwahati)

Team	P	W	L	T	NR	Pts	NRR
Nagaland (Q)	6	6	0	0	0	24	+2.690
Jammu and Kashmir	6	5	1	0	0	20	+1.316
Pondicherry	6	4	2	0	0	16	+1.025
Manipur	6	3	3	0	0	12	–0.635
Sikkim	6	2	4	0	0	8	–0.758
Mizoram	6	1	5	0	0	4	–0.129
Arunachal Pradesh	6	0	6	0	0	0	–3.367

- Advanced to the quarter-finals.
- Advanced to the pre-quarter-finals.

=== Fixtures ===
==== Elite Group A ====
Round	Scorecard	Date	Team 1	Team 2	Result
Round 1	Scorecard	18 April	Meghalaya	Hyderabad	Hyderabad won by 64 runs
Round 1	Scorecard	18 April	Andhra	Maharashtra	Andhra won by 41 runs
Round 1	Scorecard	18 April	Rajasthan	Kerala	Kerala won by 8 wickets
Round 2	Scorecard	19 April	Andhra	Hyderabad	Andhra won by 26 runs
Round 2	Scorecard	19 April	Meghalaya	Rajasthan	Rajasthan won by 49 runs
Round 2	Scorecard	19 April	Kerala	Maharashtra	Maharashtra won by 2 wickets
Round 3	Scorecard	21 April	Andhra	Kerala	Kerala won by 4 wickets
Round 3	Scorecard	21 April	Meghalaya	Maharashtra	Maharashtra won by 118 runs
Round 3	Scorecard	21 April	Rajasthan	Hyderabad	Rajasthan won by 7 wickets
Round 4	Scorecard	22 April	Meghalaya	Kerala	Kerala won by 8 wickets
Round 4	Scorecard	22 April	Andhra	Rajasthan	Rajasthan won by 2 wickets
Round 4	Scorecard	22 April	Hyderabad	Maharashtra	Maharashtra won by 7 wickets
Round 5	Scorecard	24 April	Rajasthan	Maharashtra	Maharashtra won by 8 wickets
Round 5	Scorecard	24 April	Hyderabad	Kerala	Kerala won by 8 wickets
Round 5	Scorecard	24 April	Andhra	Meghalaya	Andhra won by 111 runs

==== Elite Group B ====
Round	Scorecard	Date	Team 1	Team 2	Result
Round 1	Scorecard	18 April	Bihar	Tripura	Tripura won by 9 wickets
Round 1	Scorecard	18 April	Jharkhand	Tamil Nadu	Jharkhand won by 8 wickets
Round 1	Scorecard	18 April	Odisha	Chhattisgarh	Odisha won by 71 runs
Round 2	Scorecard	19 April	Jharkhand	Tripura	Jharkhand won by 6 wickets
Round 2	Scorecard	19 April	Bihar	Odisha	Odisha won by 7 wickets
Round 2	Scorecard	19 April	Chhattisgarh	Tamil Nadu	Tamil Nadu won by 5 runs
Round 3	Scorecard	21 April	Jharkhand	Chhattisgarh	Jharkhand won by 9 wickets
Round 3	Scorecard	21 April	Bihar	Tamil Nadu	Tamil Nadu won by 28 runs
Round 3	Scorecard	21 April	Odisha	Tripura	Odisha won by 7 wickets
Round 4	Scorecard	22 April	Bihar	Chhattisgarh	Chhattisgarh won by 31 runs
Round 4	Scorecard	22 April	Jharkhand	Odisha	Odisha won by 16 runs
Round 4	Scorecard	22 April	Tripura	Tamil Nadu	Tamil Nadu won by 34 runs
Round 5	Scorecard	24 April	Odisha	Tamil Nadu	Odisha won by 2 runs
Round 5	Scorecard	24 April	Tripura	Chhattisgarh	Tripura won by 3 wickets
Round 5	Scorecard	24 April	Jharkhand	Bihar	Jharkhand won by 9 wickets

==== Elite Group C ====
Round	Scorecard	Date	Team 1	Team 2	Result
Round 1	Scorecard	18 April	Railways	Himachal Pradesh	Railways won by 64 runs
Round 1	Scorecard	18 April	Madhya Pradesh	Delhi	Delhi won by 9 wickets
Round 1	Scorecard	18 April	Karnataka	Chandigarh	Chandigarh won by 6 wickets
Round 2	Scorecard	19 April	Madhya Pradesh	Himachal Pradesh	Madhya Pradesh won by 29 runs
Round 2	Scorecard	19 April	Railways	Karnataka	Railways won by 34 runs
Round 2	Scorecard	19 April	Chandigarh	Delhi	Delhi won by 8 wickets
Round 3	Scorecard	21 April	Madhya Pradesh	Chandigarh	Madhya Pradesh won by 14 runs
Round 3	Scorecard	21 April	Railways	Delhi	Railways won by 24 runs
Round 3	Scorecard	21 April	Karnataka	Himachal Pradesh	Himachal Pradesh won by 7 wickets
Round 4	Scorecard	22 April	Railways	Chandigarh	Railways won by 6 wickets
Round 4	Scorecard	22 April	Madhya Pradesh	Karnataka	Karnataka won by 5 wickets
Round 4	Scorecard	22 April	Himachal Pradesh	Delhi	Himachal Pradesh won by 7 wickets
Round 5	Scorecard	24 April	Karnataka	Delhi	Delhi won by 6 wickets
Round 5	Scorecard	24 April	Himachal Pradesh	Chandigarh	Himachal Pradesh won by 7 wickets
Round 5	Scorecard	24 April	Madhya Pradesh	Railways	Railways won by 5 wickets

==== Elite Group D ====
Round	Scorecard	Date	Team 1	Team 2	Result
Round 1	Scorecard	18 April	Vidarbha	Uttar Pradesh	Uttar Pradesh won by 6 runs
Round 1	Scorecard	18 April	Gujarat	Goa	Goa won by 4 wickets
Round 1	Scorecard	18 April	Baroda	Uttarakhand	Uttarakhand won by 3 runs
Round 2	Scorecard	19 April	Gujarat	Uttar Pradesh	Uttar Pradesh won by 7 wickets
Round 2	Scorecard	19 April	Vidarbha	Baroda	Baroda won by 37 runs
Round 2	Scorecard	19 April	Uttarakhand	Goa	Goa won by 8 wickets
Round 3	Scorecard	21 April	Gujarat	Uttarakhand	Gujarat won by 8 wickets
Round 3	Scorecard	21 April	Vidarbha	Goa	Goa won by 7 wickets
Round 3	Scorecard	21 April	Baroda	Uttar Pradesh	Baroda won by 6 wickets
Round 4	Scorecard	22 April	Vidarbha	Uttarakhand	Vidarbha won by 20 runs
Round 4	Scorecard	22 April	Gujarat	Baroda	Baroda won by 20 runs
Round 4	Scorecard	22 April	Uttar Pradesh	Goa	Goa won by 8 wickets
Round 5	Scorecard	24 April	Baroda	Goa	Baroda won by 10 runs
Round 5	Scorecard	24 April	Uttar Pradesh	Uttarakhand	Uttar Pradesh won by 108 runs
Round 5	Scorecard	24 April	Gujarat	Vidarbha	Vidarbha won by 51 runs

==== Elite Group E ====
Round	Scorecard	Date	Team 1	Team 2	Result
Round 1	Scorecard	18 April	Haryana	Punjab	Haryana won by 3 wickets
Round 1	Scorecard	18 April	Assam	Saurashtra	Assam won by 19 runs
Round 1	Scorecard	18 April	Mumbai	Bengal	Mumbai won by 45 runs
Round 2	Scorecard	19 April	Assam	Punjab	Punjab won by 6 wickets
Round 2	Scorecard	19 April	Haryana	Mumbai	Mumbai won by 5 runs
Round 2	Scorecard	19 April	Bengal	Saurashtra	Bengal won by 10 wickets
Round 3	Scorecard	21 April	Assam	Bengal	Bengal won by 8 wickets
Round 3	Scorecard	21 April	Haryana	Saurashtra	Haryana won by 8 wickets
Round 3	Scorecard	21 April	Mumbai	Punjab	Punjab won by 7 wickets
Round 4	Scorecard	22 April	Haryana	Bengal	Haryana won by 7 wickets
Round 4	Scorecard	22 April	Assam	Mumbai	Mumbai won by 10 wickets
Round 4	Scorecard	22 April	Punjab	Saurashtra	Punjab won by 7 wickets
Round 5	Scorecard	24 April	Mumbai	Saurashtra	Mumbai won by 9 wickets
Round 5	Scorecard	24 April	Punjab	Bengal	Bengal won by 43 runs
Round 5	Scorecard	24 April	Assam	Haryana	Haryana won by 5 wickets

==== Plate Group ====
Round	Scorecard	Date	Team 1	Team 2	Result
Round 1	Scorecard	15 April	Nagaland	Arunachal Pradesh	Nagaland won by 122 runs
Round 1	Scorecard	15 April	Pondicherry	Mizoram	Pondicherry won by 7 wickets
Round 1	Scorecard	15 April	Sikkim	Manipur	Manipur won by 36 runs
Round 2	Scorecard	16 April	Pondicherry	Arunachal Pradesh	Pondicherry won by 73 runs
Round 2	Scorecard	16 April	Nagaland	Manipur	Nagaland won by 8 wickets
Round 2	Scorecard	16 April	Jammu and Kashmir	Mizoram	Jammu and Kashmir won by 4 wickets
Round 3	Scorecard	18 April	Sikkim	Pondicherry	Pondicherry won by 4 runs
Round 3	Scorecard	18 April	Jammu and Kashmir	Nagaland	Nagaland won by 32 runs
Round 3	Scorecard	18 April	Manipur	Arunachal Pradesh	Manipur won by 81 runs
Round 4	Scorecard	19 April	Jammu and Kashmir	Manipur	Jammu and Kashmir won by 110 runs
Round 4	Scorecard	19 April	Sikkim	Mizoram	Sikkim won by 4 wickets
Round 4	Scorecard	19 April	Pondicherry	Nagaland	Nagaland won by 7 wickets
Round 5	Scorecard	21 April	Sikkim	Jammu and Kashmir	Jammu and Kashmir won by 8 wickets
Round 5	Scorecard	21 April	Pondicherry	Manipur	Pondicherry won by 8 wickets
Round 5	Scorecard	21 April	Mizoram	Arunachal Pradesh	Mizoram won by 38 runs
Round 6	Scorecard	22 April	Nagaland	Mizoram	Nagaland won by 6 runs
Round 6	Scorecard	22 April	Sikkim	Arunachal Pradesh	Sikkim won by 54 runs
Round 6	Scorecard	22 April	Jammu and Kashmir	Pondicherry	Jammu and Kashmir won by 8 runs
Round 7	Scorecard	24 April	Manipur	Mizoram	Manipur won by 19 runs
Round 7	Scorecard	24 April	Jammu and Kashmir	Arunachal Pradesh	Jammu and Kashmir won by 36 runs
Round 7	Scorecard	24 April	Sikkim	Nagaland	Nagaland won by 79 runs

== Knockout stages ==
Pre-quarter-finals
C2	Himachal Pradesh	167/2
D2	Goa	164/7
B2	Jharkhand	110/8
E2	Haryana	112/1
A2	Kerala	117/3
P1	Nagaland	116/5

Quarter-finals
A1	Maharashtra	102/1
C2	Himachal Pradesh	100/9
D1	Baroda	173/3
E1	Mumbai	171/6
B1	Odisha	151/6
E2	Haryana	138/8
C1	Railways	166/6
A2	Kerala	95/9

Semi-finals
A1	Maharashtra	125/4
D1	Baroda	121/7
B1	Odisha	124/7
C1	Railways	159/2

Final
A1	Maharashtra	160/4
C1	Railways	165/3

=== Pre-quarter-finals ===
28 April 2022
Scorecard

Nagaland; 116/5 (20 overs)	v	Kerala; 117/3 (18 overs)
Kiran Navgire 56 (44); Darsana Mohanan 2/17 (3 overs)		A Akshaya 57 (56); Poonam Khemnar 2/23 (4 overs)

Kerala won by 7 wickets
Lalabhai Contractor Stadium, Surat
Umpires: Gayathri Venugopalan nd Kadali Ravi Teja

- Nagaland won the toss and elected to bat.

28 April 2022
Scorecard

Jharkhand; 110/8 (20 overs)	v	Haryana; 112/1 (11.2 overs)
Monika Murmu 27 (27); Shafali Verma 2/16 (4 overs)		Shafali Verma 65* (33); Devyani Prasad 1/22 (3 overs)

Haryana won by 9 wickets
Lalabhai Contractor Stadium, Surat
Umpires: Gayathri Venugopalan and Kadali Ravi Teja

- Haryana won the toss and elected to field.

28 April 2022
Scorecard

Himachal Pradesh; 167/2 (20 overs)	v	Goa; 164/7 (20 overs)
Harleen Deol 84* (66); Metali Ramesh Gawandar 1/14 (2 overs)		Shikha Pandey 77 (50); Anisha Ansari 3/22 (4 overs)

Himachal Pradesh won by 3 runs
C K Pithawala Ground, Surat
Umpires: Piyush Khakhar and MM Srinivasarangan

- Goa won the toss and elected to field.

=== Quarter-finals ===
29 April 2022
Scorecard

Mumbai; 171/6 (20 overs)	v	Baroda; 173/3 (18.4 overs)
Simran Shaikh 34 (22); Ridhi Maurya 2/10 (3 overs)		Tarannum Pathan 55 (40); Prakashiki Naik 1/27 (4 overs)

Baroda won by 7 wickets
C K Pithawala Ground, Surat
Umpires: MM Srinivasarangan and Kadali Ravi Teja

- Mumbai won the toss and elected to bat.

30 April 2022
Scorecard

Himachal Pradesh; 100/9 (20 overs)	v	Maharashtra; 102/1 (13.4 overs)
Prachi Chauhan 41* (47); Devika Vaidya 3/18 (4 overs)		Smriti Mandhana 46* (36); Nikita Chauhan 1/21 (3.4 overs)

Maharashtra won by 9 wickets
Lalabhai Contractor Stadium, Surat
Umpires: Piyush Khakhar and Gayathri Venugopalan

- Maharashtra won the toss and elected to field.

30 April 2022
Scorecard

Odisha; 151/6 (20 overs)	v	Haryana; 138/8 (20 overs)
Madhuri Mehta 66 (55); Mansi Joshi 2/18 (4 overs)		Suman Gulia 31 (22); Sujata Mallik 2/20 (3 overs)

Odisha won by 13 runs
Lalabhai Contractor Stadium, Surat
Umpires: Piyush Khakhar and Gayathri Venugopalan

- Haryana won the toss and elected to field.

30 April 2022
Scorecard

Railways; 166/6 (20 overs)	v	Kerala; 95/9 (20 overs)
Dayalan Hemalatha 64 (37); Darsana Mohanan 1/16 (1 over)		Sajeevan Sajana 25 (29); Asha Sobhana 3/19 (4 overs)

Railways won by 71 runs
C K Pithawala Ground, Surat
Umpires: MM Srinivasarangan and Kadali Ravi Teja

- Kerala won the toss and elected to field.

=== Semi-finals ===
2 May 2022
Scorecard

Baroda; 121/7 (20 overs)	v	Maharashtra; 125/4 (19.1 overs)
Yastika Bhatia 71 (45); Utkarsha Pawar 3/21 (4 overs)		Shivali Shinde 44 (37); Jaya Mohite 1/12 (2.1 overs)

Maharashtra won by 6 wickets
Lalabhai Contractor Stadium, Surat
Umpires: Gayathri Venugopalan and Kadali Ravi Teja

- Maharashtra won the toss and elected to field.

2 May 2022
Scorecard

Railways; 159/2 (20 overs)	v	Odisha; 124/7 (20 overs)
Sabbhineni Meghana 84 (63); Priyanka Priyadarshini 1/36 (4 overs)		Madhuri Mehta 35 (25); Swagatika Rath 2/23 (4 overs)

Railways won by 35 runs
Lalabhai Contractor Stadium, Surat
Umpires: MM Srinivsarangan and Piyush Khakhar

- Railways won the toss and elected to bat.

=== Final ===
4 May 2022
Scorecard

Maharashtra; 160/4 (20 overs)	v	Railways; 165/3 (18.1 overs)
Smriti Mandhana 84 (56); Swagatika Rath 3/33 (4 overs)		Dayalan Hemalatha 65 (41); Maya Sonawane 2/22 (3.1 overs)

Railways won by 7 wickets
Lalabhai Contractor Stadium, Surat
Umpires: Piyush Khakhar and MM Srinivasarangan

- Maharashtra won the toss and elected to bat.

== Statistics ==
=== Most runs ===
Player	Team	Matches	Innings	Runs	Average	HS	100s	50s
Kiran Navgire	Nagaland	7	7	525	131.25	162*	1	4
Yastika Bhatia	Baroda	7	7	325	54.17	72*	0	4
Shafali Verma	Haryana	7	7	303	60.60	75*	0	5
Dayalan Hemalatha	Railways	8	8	272	38.86	69	0	3
Sabbhineni Meghana	Railways	8	8	263	32.88	84	0	2

Source: BCCI

=== Most wickets ===
Player	Team	Overs	Wickets	Average	5w
Aarti Kedar	Maharashtra	28.0	13	10.30	0
Sujata Mallik	Odisha	23.0	11	11.81	0
Priyanka Priyadarshini	Odisha	27.0	11	12.00	0
Maya Sonawane	Maharashtra	25.1	11	14.00	0
Rebecca Arul	Pondicherry	20.0	10	7.10	0

Source: BCCI
