= 2018–19 Senior Women's T20 League =

- Dates: 20 February 2019 – 13 March 2019
- Administrator: BCCI
- Cricket format: Twenty20
- Tournament format(s): Round-robin tournament and knockouts
- Champions: Punjab (1st title)
- Runners-up: Karnataka
- Participants: 36
- Most runs: Priya Punia (382)
- Most wickets: Priyanka Priyadarshini (17)
- Official website: bcci.tv

The 2018–19 Senior Women's T20 League was the 11th edition of the women's Twenty20 cricket competition in India. It was held from 20 February to 13 March 2019. Delhi, the defending champions, reached the Super League stage but that is where their journey ended.

The tournament had five groups, with four groups containing seven teams and one group with eight teams. The top two teams in each group qualified for the Super League stage of the tournament, with the teams split into two further groups of five teams. Delhi and Himachal from Group A, Assam and Maharashtra from Group B, Railways and Jharkhand from Group C, Karnataka and Punjab from Group D and Madhya Pradesh and Odisha from Group E qualified for the Super League stage. The top team from each Super League group, Punjab from Super League Group A and Karnataka from Super League Group B progressed to the final. Punjab beat Karnataka by 4 runs to win the tournament.

In Group E's Round 2 fixture between Mizoram and Madhya Pradesh, Mizoram was all out for 9 runs with 9 batters scoring ducks. Apurwa Bhardwaj was the only batter to get off the mark for Mizoram.

== League stage ==
=== Points table ===
Group A

Team	P	W	L	T	NR	Pts	NRR
Delhi	6	5	1	0	0	20	+2.287
Himachal	6	5	1	0	0	20	+1.920
Mumbai	6	5	1	0	0	20	+1.461
Andhra	6	3	3	0	0	12	+1.165
Tamil Nadu	6	2	4	0	0	8	+0.914
Meghalaya	6	1	5	0	0	4	–3.466
Manipur	6	0	6	0	0	0	–4.540

Group B

Team	P	W	L	T	NR	Pts	NRR
Assam	6	5	1	0	0	20	+1.295
Maharashtra	6	5	1	0	0	20	+2.535
Chhattisgarh	6	4	2	0	0	16	+0.851
Haryana	6	3	3	0	0	12	+1.379
Gujarat	6	3	3	0	0	12	+0.915
Sikkim	6	1	5	0	0	4	–2.879
Nagaland	6	0	6	0	0	0	–4.494

Group C

Team	P	W	L	T	NR	Pts	NRR
Railways	6	6	0	0	0	24	+3.484
Jharkhand	6	4	2	0	0	16	+1.991
Vidarbha	6	4	2	0	0	16	+1.748
Baroda	6	4	2	0	0	16	+1.511
Uttar Pradesh	6	2	4	0	0	8	+1.338
Bihar	6	1	5	0	0	4	–4.149
Arunachal Pradesh	6	0	6	0	0	0	–6.125

Group D

Team	P	W	L	T	NR	Pts	NRR
Karnataka	6	5	0	0	1	22	+2.089
Punjab	6	5	0	0	1	22	+1.662
Hyderabad	6	3	2	0	1	14	+0.168
Tripura	6	2	3	0	1	10	–0.436
Goa	6	2	4	0	0	8	+0.615
Uttarakhand	6	1	4	0	1	6	–1.544
Jammu and Kashmir	6	0	5	0	1	2	–2.929

Group E

Team	P	W	L	T	NR	Pts	NRR
Madhya Pradesh	7	7	0	0	0	28	+1.530
Odisha	7	5	2	0	0	20	+1.309
Kerala	7	4	3	0	0	16	+1.174
Bengal	7	4	3	0	0	16	+0.880
Saurashtra	7	4	3	0	0	16	+0.854
Rajasthan	7	3	4	0	0	12	+0.560
Pondicherry	7	1	6	0	0	4	–0.835
Mizoram	7	0	7	0	0	0	–7.154

- Top 2 teams from each group advanced to the Super League.

=== Fixtures ===
==== Group A ====
Round	No.	Date	Batting 1st	Batting 2nd	Venue	Result
Round-I	A1	20 February	Delhi	Andhra	Sharad Pawar Cricket Academy BKC, Mumbai	Delhi won by 25 Runs
Round-I	A2	20 February	Meghalaya	Himachal	Sharad Pawar Cricket Academy BKC, Mumbai	Himachal won by 7 Wickets
Round-I	A3	20 February	Manipur	Mumbai	Sachin Tendulkar Gymkhana, Mumbai	Mumbai won by 8 Wickets
Round-II	A4	21 February	Andhra	Meghalaya	Sachin Tendulkar Gymkhana, Mumbai	Andhra won by 101 Runs
Round-II	A5	21 February	Delhi	Manipur	Sachin Tendulkar Gymkhana, Mumbai	Delhi won by 130 Runs
Round-II	A6	21 February	Tamil Nadu	Mumbai	Sharad Pawar Cricket Academy BKC, Mumbai	Mumbai won by 9 Wickets
Round-III	A7	23 February	Manipur	Andhra	Sharad Pawar Cricket Academy BKC, Mumbai	Andhra won by 8 Wickets
Round-III	A8	23 February	Delhi	Meghalaya	Sharad Pawar Cricket Academy BKC, Mumbai	Delhi won by 101 Runs
Round-III	A9	23 February	Tamil Nadu	Himachal	Sachin Tendulkar Gymkhana, Mumbai	Himachal won by 9 Wickets
Round-IV	A10	24 February	Andhra	Himachal	Sachin Tendulkar Gymkhana, Mumbai	Himachal won by 7 Wickets
Round-IV	A11	24 February	Manipur	Tamil Nadu	Sharad Pawar Cricket Academy BKC, Mumbai	Tamil Nadu won by 9 Wickets
Round-IV	A12	24 February	Mumbai	Meghalaya	Sachin Tendulkar Gymkhana, Mumbai	Mumbai won by 79 Runs
Round-V	A13	26 February	Andhra	Tamil Nadu	Sharad Pawar Cricket Academy BKC, Mumbai	Andhra won by 15 Runs
Round-V	A14	26 February	Delhi	Mumbai	Sharad Pawar Cricket Academy BKC, Mumbai	Mumbai won by 6 Wickets
Round-V	A15	26 February	Manipur	Himachal	Sachin Tendulkar Gymkhana, Mumbai	Himachal won by 10 Wickets
Round-VI	A16	27 February	Tamil Nadu	Delhi	Sachin Tendulkar Gymkhana, Mumbai	Delhi won by 6 Wickets
Round-VI	A17	27 February	Himachal	Mumbai	Sachin Tendulkar Gymkhana, Mumbai	Himachal won by 41 Runs
Round-VI	A18	27 February	Meghalaya	Manipur	Sharad Pawar Cricket Academy BKC, Mumbai	Meghalaya won by 45 Runs
Round-VII	A19	1 March	Mumbai	Andhra	Sharad Pawar Cricket Academy BKC, Mumbai	Mumbai won by 13 Runs
Round-VII	A20	1 March	Delhi	Himachal	Sharad Pawar Cricket Academy BKC, Mumbai	Delhi won by 2 Runs
Round-VII	A21	1 March	Tamil Nadu	Meghalaya	Sachin Tendulkar Gymkhana, Mumbai	Tamil Nadu won by 127 Runs

==== Group B ====
Round	No.	Date	Batting 1st	Batting 2nd	Venue	Result
Round-I	B1	20 February	Assam	Chhattisgarh	Shaheed Veer Narayan Singh International Cricket Stadium, Raipur	Chhattisgarh won by 9 Wickets
Round-I	B2	20 February	Gujarat	Maharashtra	Shaheed Veer Narayan Singh International Cricket Stadium, Raipur	Maharashtra won by 5 Wickets
Round-I	B3	20 February	Haryana	Nagaland	RDCA Ground, Raipur	Haryana won by 163 Runs
Round-II	B4	21 February	Assam	Maharashtra	RDCA Ground, Raipur	Assam won by 1 Run
Round-II	B5	21 February	Haryana	Chhattisgarh	Shaheed Veer Narayan Singh International Cricket Stadium, Raipur	Chhattisgarh won by 4 Wickets
Round-II	B6	21 February	Nagaland	Sikkim	Shaheed Veer Narayan Singh International Cricket Stadium, Raipur	Sikkim won by 7 Wickets
Round-III	B7	23 February	Haryana	Assam	RDCA Ground, Raipur	Assam won by 5 Wickets
Round-III	B8	23 February	Maharashtra	Chhattisgarh	Shaheed Veer Narayan Singh International Cricket Stadium, Raipur	Maharashtra won by 28 Runs
Round-III	B9	23 February	Gujarat	Sikkim	Shaheed Veer Narayan Singh International Cricket Stadium, Raipur	Gujarat won by 42 Runs
Round-IV	B10	24 February	Assam	Gujarat	Shaheed Veer Narayan Singh International Cricket Stadium, Raipur	Assam won by 2 Runs
Round-IV	B11	24 February	Haryana	Sikkim	RDCA Ground, Raipur	Haryana won by 48 Runs
Round-IV	B12	24 February	Maharashtra	Nagaland	Shaheed Veer Narayan Singh International Cricket Stadium, Raipur	Maharashtra won by 140 Runs
Round-V	B13	26 February	Assam	Sikkim	Shaheed Veer Narayan Singh International Cricket Stadium, Raipur	Assam won by 75 Runs
Round-V	B14	26 February	Nagaland	Chhattisgarh	RDCA Ground, Raipur	Chhattisgarh won by 9 Wickets
Round-V	B15	26 February	Gujarat	Haryana	Shaheed Veer Narayan Singh International Cricket Stadium, Raipur	Haryana won by 6 Wickets
Round-VI	B16	27 February	Sikkim	Chhattisgarh	Shaheed Veer Narayan Singh International Cricket Stadium, Raipur	Chhattisgarh won by 9 Wickets
Round-VI	B17	27 February	Gujarat	Nagaland	Shaheed Veer Narayan Singh International Cricket Stadium, Raipur	Gujarat won by 41 Runs
Round-VI	B18	27 February	Maharashtra	Haryana	RDCA Ground, Raipur	Maharashtra won by 9 Wickets
Round-VII	B19	1 March	Assam	Nagaland	Shaheed Veer Narayan Singh International Cricket Stadium, Raipur	Assam won by 69 Runs
Round-VII	B20	1 March	Gujarat	Chhattisgarh	RDCA Ground, Raipur	Gujarat won by 45 Runs
Round-VII	B21	1 March	Maharashtra	Sikkim	Shaheed Veer Narayan Singh International Cricket Stadium, Raipur	Maharashtra won by 81 Runs

==== Group C ====
Round	No.	Date	Batting 1st	Batting 2nd	Venue	Result
Round-I	C1	20 February	Arunachal Pradesh	Baroda	Vidarbha Cricket Association Ground, Nagpur	Baroda won by 9 Wickets
Round-I	C2	20 February	Bihar	Railways	Vidarbha Cricket Association Ground, Nagpur	Railways won by 10 Wickets
Round-I	C3	20 February	Uttar Pradesh	Jharkhand	VCA Kalmana, Nagpur	Jharkhand won by 2 Wickets
Round-II	C4	21 February	Arunachal Pradesh	Railways	VCA Kalmana, Nagpur	Railways won by 9 Wickets
Round-II	C5	21 February	Jharkhand	Baroda	VCA Kalmana, Nagpur	Jharkhand won by 31 Runs
Round-II	C6	21 February	Uttar Pradesh	Vidarbha	Vidarbha Cricket Association Ground, Nagpur	Vidarbha won by 5 Wickets
Round-III	C7	23 February	Jharkhand	Arunachal Pradesh	Vidarbha Cricket Association Ground, Nagpur	Jharkhand won by 131 Runs
Round-III	C8	23 February	Baroda	Railways	Vidarbha Cricket Association Ground, Nagpur	Railways won by 8 Wickets
Round-III	C9	23 February	Bihar	Vidarbha	VCA Kalmana, Nagpur	Vidarbha won by 7 Wickets
Round-IV	C10	24 February	Bihar	Arunachal Pradesh	VCA Kalmana, Nagpur	Bihar won by 60 Runs
Round-IV	C11	24 February	Jharkhand	Vidarbha	VCA Kalmana, Nagpur	Vidarbha won by 7 Wickets
Round-IV	C12	24 February	Railways	Uttar Pradesh	Vidarbha Cricket Association Ground, Nagpur	Railways won by 46 Runs
Round-V	C13	26 February	Vidarbha	Arunachal Pradesh	Vidarbha Cricket Association Ground, Nagpur	Vidarbha won by 139 Runs
Round-V	C14	26 February	Baroda	Uttar Pradesh	Vidarbha Cricket Association Ground, Nagpur	Baroda won by 1 Run
Round-V	C15	26 February	Bihar	Jharkhand	VCA Kalmana, Nagpur	Jharkhand won by 9 Wickets
Round-VI	C16	27 February	Baroda	Vidarbha	Vidarbha Cricket Association Ground, Nagpur	Baroda won by 15 Runs
Round-VI	C17	27 February	Uttar Pradesh	Bihar	VCA Kalmana, Nagpur	Uttar Pradesh won by 112 Runs
Round-VI	C18	27 February	Jharkhand	Railways	VCA Kalmana, Nagpur	Railways won by 4 Wickets
Round-VII	C19	1 March	Uttar Pradesh	Arunachal Pradesh	VCA Kalmana, Nagpur	Uttar Pradesh won by 114 Runs
Round-VII	C20	1 March	Baroda	Bihar	Vidarbha Cricket Association Ground, Nagpur	Baroda won by 133 Runs
Round-VII	C21	1 March	Vidarbha	Railways	Vidarbha Cricket Association Ground, Nagpur	Railways won by 8 Wickets

==== Group D ====
Round	No.	Date	Batting 1st	Batting 2nd	Venue	Result
Round-I	D1	20 February	Hyderabad	Goa	Maharaja Bir Bikram College Stadium, Agartala	Hyderabad won by 10 Runs
Round-I	D2	20 February	Jammu and Kashmir	Punjab	Maharaja Bir Bikram College Stadium, Agartala	Punjab won by 9 Wickets
Round-I	D3	20 February	Tripura	Karnataka	Police Training Academy Ground, Agartala	Karnataka won by 7 Wickets
Round-II	D4	21 February	Punjab	Goa	Maharaja Bir Bikram College Stadium, Agartala	Punjab won by 27 Runs
Round-II	D5	21 February	Hyderabad	Karnataka	Police Training Academy Ground, Agartala	Karnataka won by 5 Wickets
Round-II	D6	21 February	Uttarakhand	Tripura	Police Training Academy Ground, Agartala	Tripura won by 6 Wickets
Round-III	D7	23 February	Karnataka	Goa	Maharaja Bir Bikram College Stadium, Agartala	Karnataka won by 1 Run
Round-III	D8	23 February	Punjab	Hyderabad	Maharaja Bir Bikram College Stadium, Agartala	Punjab won by 23 Runs
Round-III	D9	23 February	Jammu and Kashmir	Uttarakhand	Police Training Academy Ground, Agartala	Uttarakhand won by 3 Wickets
Round-IV	D10	24 February	Goa	Jammu and Kashmir	Police Training Academy Ground, Agartala	Goa won by 78 Runs
Round-IV	D11	24 February	Uttarakhand	Karnataka	Maharaja Bir Bikram College Stadium, Agartala	Karnataka won by 8 Wickets
Round-IV	D12	24 February	Tripura	Punjab	Police Training Academy Ground, Agartala	Match tied (Punjab won the Super Over)
Round-V	D13	26 February	Goa	Uttarakhand	Maharaja Bir Bikram College Stadium, Agartala	Goa won by 43 Runs
Round-V	D14	26 February	Tripura	Hyderabad	Police Training Academy Ground, Agartala	Hyderabad won by 6 Wickets
Round-V	D15	26 February	Karnataka	Jammu and Kashmir	Police Training Academy Ground, Agartala	Karnataka won by 48 Runs
Round-VI	D16	27 February	Hyderabad vs Uttarakhand		Maharaja Bir Bikram College Stadium, Agartala	Match Abandoned
Round-VI	D17	27 February	Jammu and Kashmir vs Tripura		Police Training Academy Ground, Agartala	Match Abandoned
Round-VI	D18	27 February	Karnataka vs Punjab		Police Training Academy Ground, Agartala	Match Abandoned
Round-VII	D19	1 March	Goa	Tripura	Police Training Academy Ground, Agartala	Tripura won by 7 Wickets
Round-VII	D20	1 March	Jammu and Kashmir	Hyderabad	Maharaja Bir Bikram College Stadium, Agartala	Hyderabad won by 7 Wickets
Round-VII	D21	1 March	Punjab	Uttarakhand	Maharaja Bir Bikram College Stadium, Agartala	Punjab won by 52 Runs

==== Group E ====
Round	No.	Date	Batting 1st	Batting 2nd	Venue	Result
Round-I	E1	20 February	Pondicherry	Bengal	Palmyra Cricket Ground, Puducherry	Bengal won by 7 Wickets
Round-I	E2	20 February	Mizoram	Kerala	CAP Siechem Ground, Puducherry	Kerala won by 10 Wickets
Round-I	E3	20 February	Rajasthan	Madhya Pradesh	Palmyra Cricket Ground, Puducherry	Madhya Pradesh won by 7 Wickets
Round-I	E4	20 February	Odisha	Saurashtra	CAP Siechem Ground, Puducherry	Odisha won by 31 Runs
Round-II	E5	21 February	Bengal	Saurashtra	Palmyra Cricket Ground, Puducherry	Bengal won by 8 Wickets
Round-II	E6	21 February	Kerala	Rajasthan	CAP Siechem Ground, Puducherry	Rajasthan Won by 4 Wickets
Round-II	E7	21 February	Madhya Pradesh	Mizoram	Palmyra Cricket Ground, Puducherry	Madhya Pradesh won by 10 Wickets
Round-II	E8	21 February	Odisha	Pondicherry	CAP Siechem Ground, Puducherry	Odisha won by 64 Runs
Round-III	E9	23 February	Bengal	Kerala	Palmyra Cricket Ground, Puducherry	Kerala won by 7 Runs
Round-III	E10	23 February	Odisha	Madhya Pradesh	CAP Siechem Ground, Puducherry	Madhya Pradesh won by 8 Wickets
Round-III	E11	23 February	Saurashtra	Mizoram	Palmyra Cricket Ground, Puducherry	Saurashtra won by 155 Runs
Round-III	E12	23 February	Pondicherry	Rajasthan	CAP Siechem Ground, Puducherry	Rajasthan Won by 5 Wickets
Round-IV	E13	24 February	Odisha	Bengal	Palmyra Cricket Ground, Puducherry	Odisha won by 20 Runs
Round-IV	E14	24 February	Kerala	Madhya Pradesh	CAP Siechem Ground, Puducherry	Madhya Pradesh won by 7 Wickets
Round-IV	E15	24 February	Rajasthan	Mizoram	Palmyra Cricket Ground, Puducherry	Rajasthan won by 138 Runs
Round-IV	E16	24 February	Pondicherry	Saurashtra	CAP Siechem Ground, Puducherry	Saurashtra won by 6 Wickets
Round-V	E17	26 February	Mizoram	Bengal	Palmyra Cricket Ground, Puducherry	Bengal won by 10 Wickets
Round-V	E18	26 February	Kerala	Pondicherry	CAP Siechem Ground, Puducherry	Kerala won by 49 Runs
Round-V	E19	26 February	Saurashtra	Madhya Pradesh	Palmyra Cricket Ground, Puducherry	Madhya Pradesh won by 7 Wickets
Round-V	E20	26 February	Odisha	Rajasthan	CAP Siechem Ground, Puducherry	Odisha won by 28 Runs
Round-VI	E21	27 February	Bengal	Madhya Pradesh	Palmyra Cricket Ground, Puducherry	Madhya Pradesh won by 6 Wickets
Round-VI	E22	27 February	Kerala	Odisha	CAP Siechem Ground, Puducherry	Kerala won by 48 Runs
Round-VI	E23	27 February	Pondicherry	Mizoram	Palmyra Cricket Ground, Puducherry	Pondicherry won by 83 Runs
Round-VI	E24	27 February	Rajasthan	Saurashtra	CAP Siechem Ground, Puducherry	Saurashtra won by 4 Wickets
Round-VII	E25	1 March	Bengal	Rajasthan	Palmyra Cricket Ground, Puducherry	Bengal won by 26 Runs
Round-VII	E26	1 March	Kerala	Saurashtra	CAP Siechem Ground, Puducherry	Saurashtra won by 5 wkts
Round-VII	E27	1 March	Pondicherry	Madhya Pradesh	Palmyra Cricket Ground, Puducherry	Madhya Pradesh won by 6 Wickets
Round-VII	E28	1 March	Mizoram	Odisha	CAP Siechem Ground, Puducherry	Odisha won by 10 Wickets

== Super League Stage ==
=== Points table ===
Super League Group A

Team	P	W	L	T	NR	Pts	NRR
Punjab (D2)	4	4	0	0	0	16	+0.297
Railways (C1)	4	3	1	0	0	12	+2.003
Maharashtra (B2)	4	2	2	0	0	8	+0.743
Delhi (A1)	4	1	3	0	0	4	–0.966
Madhya Pradesh (E1)	4	0	4	0	0	0	–1.572

Super League Group B

Team	P	W	L	T	NR	Pts	NRR
Karnataka (D1)	4	3	1	0	0	12	+0.273
Himachal (A2)	4	3	1	0	0	12	+0.278
Assam (B1)	4	2	2	0	0	8	–0.097
Jharkhand (C2)	4	1	3	0	0	4	–0.025
Odisha (E2)	4	1	3	0	0	4	–0.390

- Top team from both the groups advanced to the final.

=== Fixtures ===
==== Super League Group A ====
Round	No.	Date	Batting 1st	Batting 2nd	Venue	Result
Round-I	SLA1	5 March	Delhi (88/5)	Maharashtra (90/3)	Sharad Pawar Cricket Academy BKC, Mumbai	Maharashtra won by 7 Wickets
Round-I	SLA2	5 March	Railways (146/4)	Punjab (147/6)	Sharad Pawar Cricket Academy BKC, Mumbai	Punjab won by 4 Wickets
Round-II	SLA3	6 March	Delhi (91/5)	Railways (92/4)	Sharad Pawar Cricket Academy BKC, Mumbai	Railways won by 6 Wickets
Round-II	SLA4	6 March	Punjab (103/8)	Madhya Pradesh (95/10)	Sharad Pawar Cricket Academy BKC, Mumbai	Punjab won by 8 Runs
Round-III	SLA5	8 March	Madhya Pradesh (108/5)	Maharashtra (109/4)	Sharad Pawar Cricket Academy BKC, Mumbai	Maharashtra won by 6 Wickets
Round-III	SLA6	8 March	Delhi (125/3)	Punjab (126/8)	Sharad Pawar Cricket Academy BKC, Mumbai	Punjab won by 2 Wickets
Round-IV	SLA7	9 March	Maharashtra (157/4)	Railways (158/7)	Sharad Pawar Cricket Academy BKC, Mumbai	Railways won by 3 Wickets
Round-IV	SLA8	9 March	Delhi (107/6)	Madhya Pradesh (103/8)	Sharad Pawar Cricket Academy BKC, Mumbai	Delhi won by 4 Runs
Round-V	SLA9	11 March	Maharashtra (120/10)	Punjab (121/3)	Wankhede Stadium, Mumbai	Punjab won by 7 Wickets
Round-V	SLA10	11 March	Madhya Pradesh (56/8)	Railways (60/0)	Wankhede Stadium, Mumbai	Railways won by 10 Wickets

==== Super League Group B ====
Round	No.	Date	Batting 1st	Batting 2nd	Venue	Result
Round-I	SLB1	5 March	Assam (99/6)	Himachal (102/1)	Sachin Tendulkar Gymkhana, Mumbai	Himachal won by 9 Wicket
Round-I	SLB2	5 March	Jharkhand (114/9)	Karnataka (115/1)	Sachin Tendulkar Gymkhana, Mumbai	Karnataka won by 9 Wickets
Round-II	SLB3	6 March	Jharkhand (154/3)	Himachal (158/6)	Sachin Tendulkar Gymkhana, Mumbai	Himachal won by 4 Wickets
Round-II	SLB4	6 March	Odisha (106/4)	Karnataka (107/7)	Sachin Tendulkar Gymkhana, Mumbai	Karnataka won by 3 Wickets
Round-III	SLB5	8 March	Assam (103/9)	Odisha (104/5)	Sachin Tendulkar Gymkhana, Mumbai	Odisha won by 5 Wickets
Round-III	SLB6	8 March	Himachal (133/3)	Karnataka (134/4)	Sachin Tendulkar Gymkhana, Mumbai	Karnataka Won by 6 Wickets
Round-IV	SLB7	9 March	Jharkhand (112/9)	Assam (113/7)	Sachin Tendulkar Gymkhana, Mumbai	Assam won by 3 Wickets
Round-IV	SLB8	9 March	Odisha (93/10)	Himachal (96/7)	Sachin Tendulkar Gymkhana, Mumbai	Himachal won by 3 Wickets
Round-V	SLB9	11 March	Karnataka (115/6)	Assam (116/3)	Sachin Tendulkar Gymkhana, Mumbai	Assam won by 7 Wickets
Round-V	SLB10	11 March	Odisha (119/6)	Jharkhand (122/2)	Sachin Tendulkar Gymkhana, Mumbai	Jharkhand won by 8 Wickets

== Final ==
13 March 2019
Scorecard

Punjab; 131/7 (20 overs)	v	Karnataka; 127/7 (20 overs)
Jasia Akhtar 56 (54); Gnanananda Divya 2/24 (3 overs)		Gnanananda Divya 41 (44); Sunita Rani 2/19 (4 overs)

Punjab won by 4 runs
Wankhede Stadium, Mumbai
Umpires: Sabyasachi Sarkar and Satrajit Lahiri

- Karnataka won the toss and elected to field.
