= Yashi Pandey =

Indian cricketer (born 1999)

Personal information
- Full name: Yashi Premkumar Pandey
- Born: 23 June 1999 (age 27); Raigarh, Chhattisgarh, India
- Height: 163 cm (5 ft 4 in)
- Batting: Right-handed
- Bowling: Right-arm off break
- Role: Batting all-rounder

Domestic team information
- Years: Team
- 2014/15–2015/16: Madhya Pradesh
- 2016/17–2022/23: Chhattisgarh
- 2023/24: Nagaland
- 2024/25: Pondicherry

Career statistics
Competition	WLA	WT20
Matches	42	29
Runs scored	1,101	611
Batting average	32.38	38.18
100s/50s	1/9	0/2
Top score	146*	60
Balls bowled	535	210
Wickets	10	10
Bowling average	47.30	18.60
5 wickets in innings	0	0
10 wickets in match	0	0
Best bowling	4/45	2/16
Catches/stumpings	9/–	5/–
- Source: CricketArchive, 13 January 2025

Yashi Premkumar Pandey (born 23 June 1999) is an Indian cricketer who currently leading BCCI Pondicherry Senior Women's Cricket Team for the Season 2024–25 in Domestic Cricket. She plays as an all-rounder, batting right-handed. She has previously played for Chhattisgarh, Nagaland and Madhya Pradesh, as well India Green, India Blue and Central Zone Under-19s. She made her domestic debut on 19 November 2015 in a one-day match for Madhya Pradesh against Karnataka.
