= 2019–20 Senior Women's One Day Trophy =

- Dates: 18 February – 20 March 2020
- Administrator(s): BCCI
- Cricket format: List A
- Tournament format(s): Round-robin and knockout
- Champions: No winner due to COVID-19
- Participants: 37
- Matches: 163

The 2019–20 Senior Women's One Day Trophy was the 14th edition of the women's List A cricket competition in India. It was scheduled to be played from 18 February to 20 March 2020 in a round-robin and knockout format. However, the tournament was ended after the round-robin stage due to the COVID-19 pandemic, with the knockout stages cancelled. There was therefore no overall winner, although three teams were promoted from the Plate Group.

== Competition format ==
The 37 teams competing in the tournament were divided into the Elite Group and the Plate Group, with the teams in the Elite Group further divided into Groups A, B and C. The tournament operated on a round-robin format, with each team playing every other team in their group once. Teams in the Plate Group competed for promotion to the Elite Group, with three teams achieving this for the following season, whilst teams in the Elite Group competed to progress to the knockout stage quarter-finals, which were cancelled due to the COVID-19 pandemic.

The groups worked on a points system with positions within the group based on the total points of each team. Points were awarded as follows:

Win: 4 points.
Tie: 2 points.
Loss: 0 points.
No Result/Abandoned: 2 points.

If points in the final table were equal, teams were separated first by most wins, then by head-to-head record, and then Net Run Rate.

== League stage ==
=== Points tables ===
==== Elite Group A ====
Team	P	W	L	T	NR	Pts	NRR
Railways	8	7	0	0	1	30	+2.535
Karnataka	8	6	1	0	1	26	+0.526
Bengal	8	5	3	0	0	20	+0.649
Maharashtra	8	3	3	0	2	16	–0.011
Baroda	8	3	4	0	1	14	–0.912
Himachal Pradesh	8	2	3	0	3	14	–0.250
Goa	8	1	5	0	2	8	–0.827
Vidarbha	8	1	5	0	2	8	–1.025
Tripura	8	1	5	0	2	8	–1.276

==== Elite Group B ====
Team	P	W	L	T	NR	Pts	NRR
Andhra	8	7	1	0	0	28	+0.444
Odisha	8	6	2	0	0	24	+0.244
Mumbai	8	4	3	1	0	18	+0.653
Delhi	8	4	3	1	0	18	+0.419
Kerala	8	4	4	0	0	16	+0.241
Haryana	8	3	5	0	0	12	–0.269
Tamil Nadu	8	3	5	0	0	12	–0.511
Chhattisgarh	8	2	6	0	0	8	–0.165
Punjab	8	2	6	0	0	8	–0.986

==== Elite Group C ====
Team	P	W	L	T	NR	Pts	NRR
Madhya Pradesh	8	8	0	0	0	32	+1.276
Jharkhand	8	6	1	0	1	26	+0.958
Uttar Pradesh	8	5	3	0	0	20	+0.494
Hyderabad	8	4	3	0	1	18	+0.238
Saurashtra	8	4	4	0	0	16	–0.070
Gujarat	8	3	5	0	0	12	–0.315
Rajasthan	8	3	5	0	0	12	–0.301
Assam	8	2	6	0	0	8	–0.308
Uttarakhand	8	0	8	0	0	0	–1.425

==== Plate Group ====
Team	P	W	L	T	NR	Pts	NRR
Chandigarh (P)	9	9	0	0	0	36	+2.073
Nagaland (P)	9	7	2	0	0	28	+0.808
Meghalaya (P)	9	7	2	0	0	28	+0.408
Jammu and Kashmir	9	6	3	0	0	24	+0.241
Pondicherry	9	6	3	0	0	24	+1.500
Mizoram	9	4	5	0	0	16	–0.499
Bihar	9	3	6	0	0	12	–0.050
Manipur	9	2	7	0	0	8	–1.040
Sikkim	9	1	8	0	0	4	–0.806
Arunachal Pradesh	9	0	9	0	0	0	–2.655

Source: BCCI

=== Fixtures ===
==== Elite Group A ====
Round	Scorecard	Date	Team 1	Team 2	Result
Round 1	Scorecard	18 February	Baroda	Maharashtra	Baroda won by 4 runs
Round 1	Scorecard	18 February	Bengal	Karnataka	Karnataka won by 4 wickets
Round 1	Scorecard	18 February	Goa	Railways	Railways won by 107 runs
Round 2	Scorecard	19 February	Baroda	Vidarbha	Vidarbha won by 105 runs
Round 2	Scorecard	19 February	Goa	Tripura	Tripura won by 4 runs
Round 2	Scorecard	19 February	Himachal Pradesh	Karnataka	Karnataka won by 83 runs
Round 3	Scorecard	20 February	Bengal	Tripura	Bengal won by 8 wickets
Round 3	Scorecard	20 February	Himachal Pradesh	Maharashtra	Maharashtra won by 4 wickets
Round 3	Scorecard	20 February	Railways	Vidarbha	Railways won by 168 runs
Round 4	Scorecard	22 February	Bengal	Goa	Bengal won by 92 runs
Round 4	Scorecard	22 February	Karnataka	Railways	Railways won by 191 runs
Round 4	Scorecard	22 February	Maharashtra	Tripura	Maharashtra won by 9 wickets
Round 5	Scorecard	23 February	Baroda	Railways	Railways won by 8 wickets
Round 5	Scorecard	23 February	Himachal Pradesh	Bengal	Bengal won by 88 runs
Round 5	Scorecard	23 February	Maharashtra	Vidarbha	Maharashtra won by 3 wickets
Round 6	Scorecard	25 February	Goa	Vidarbha	Goa won by 6 wickets
Round 6	Scorecard	25 February	Himachal Pradesh	Baroda	Himachal Pradesh won by 89 runs
Round 6	Scorecard	25 February	Karnataka	Tripura	Karnataka won by 98 runs
Round 7	Scorecard	27 February	Baroda	Bengal	Baroda won by 3 wickets
Round 7	Scorecard	27 February	Goa	Karnataka	Karnataka won by 8 wickets
Round 7	Scorecard	27 February	Maharashtra	Railways	Railways won by 10 wickets
Round 8	Scorecard	29 February	Baroda	Tripura	Match Abandoned
Round 8	Scorecard	29 February	Goa	Maharashtra	Match Abandoned
Round 8	Scorecard	29 February	Himachal Pradesh	Vidarbha	Match Abandoned
Round 9	Scorecard	2 March	Bengal	Maharashtra	Bengal won by 74 runs
Round 9	Scorecard	2 March	Karnataka	Vidarbha	Karnataka won by 2 wickets
Round 9	Scorecard	2 March	Railways	Tripura	Railways won by 9 wickets
Round 10	Scorecard	4 March	Baroda	Goa	Baroda won by 3 wickets
Round 10	Scorecard	4 March	Bengal	Railways	Railways won by 114 runs
Round 10	Scorecard	4 March	Himachal Pradesh	Tripura	Himachal Pradesh won by 6 wickets
Round 11	Scorecard	6 March	Himachal Pradesh	Goa	Match Abandoned
Round 11	Scorecard	6 March	Karnataka	Maharashtra	Match Abandoned
Round 11	Scorecard	6 March	Tripura	Vidarbha	Match Abandoned
Round 12	Scorecard	8 March	Baroda	Karnataka	Karnataka won by 48 runs
Round 12	Scorecard	8 March	Bengal	Vidarbha	Bengal won by 92 runs
Round 12	Scorecard	8 March	Himachal Pradesh	Railways	Match Abandoned

==== Elite Group B ====
Round	Scorecard	Date	Team 1	Team 2	Result
Round 1	Scorecard	18 February	Chhattisgarh	Kerala	Kerala won by 8 wickets
Round 1	Scorecard	18 February	Delhi	Odisha	Odisha won by 4 wickets
Round 1	Scorecard	18 February	Mumbai	Andhra	Andhra won by 4 wickets
Round 2	Scorecard	19 February	Andhra	Tamil Nadu	Andhra won by 6 wickets
Round 2	Scorecard	19 February	Delhi	Punjab	Delhi won by 65 runs
Round 2	Scorecard	19 February	Haryana	Kerala	Kerala won by 3 wickets
Round 3	Scorecard	20 February	Chhattisgarh	Punjab	Chhattisgarh won by 135 runs
Round 3	Scorecard	20 February	Mumbai	Haryana	Mumbai won by 6 wickets
Round 3	Scorecard	20 February	Odisha	Tamil Nadu	Tamil Nadu won by 15 runs
Round 4	Scorecard	22 February	Chhattisgarh	Delhi	Chhattisgarh won by 4 wickets
Round 4	Scorecard	22 February	Kerala	Odisha	Odisha won by 81 runs
Round 4	Scorecard	22 February	Mumbai	Punjab	Mumbai won by 194 runs
Round 5	Scorecard	23 February	Andhra	Odisha	Odisha won by 52 runs
Round 5	Scorecard	23 February	Chhattisgarh	Haryana	Haryana won by 7 wickets
Round 5	Scorecard	23 February	Mumbai	Tamil Nadu	Tamil Nadu won by 115 runs
Round 6	Scorecard	25 February	Andhra	Haryana	Andhra won by 8 wickets
Round 6	Scorecard	25 February	Delhi	Tamil Nadu	Delhi won by 6 wickets
Round 6	Scorecard	25 February	Kerala	Punjab	Kerala won by 6 wickets
Round 7	Scorecard	27 February	Andhra	Chhattisgarh	Andhra won by 7 wickets
Round 7	Scorecard	27 February	Delhi	Kerala	Delhi won by 2 wickets
Round 7	Scorecard	27 February	Mumbai	Odisha	Odisha won by 3 wickets
Round 8	Scorecard	29 February	Andhra	Punjab	Andhra won by 4 wickets
Round 8	Scorecard	29 February	Haryana	Tamil Nadu	Haryana won by 2 wickets
Round 8	Scorecard	29 February	Mumbai	Delhi	Match Tied
Round 9	Scorecard	2 March	Kerala	Tamil Nadu	Kerala won by 5 wickets
Round 9	Scorecard	2 March	Mumbai	Chhattisgarh	Mumbai won by 7 wickets
Round 9	Scorecard	2 March	Odisha	Punjab	Punjab won by 3 wickets
Round 10	Scorecard	4 March	Andhra	Delhi	Andhra won by 6 wickets
Round 10	Scorecard	4 March	Chhattisgarh	Odisha	Odisha won by 2 wickets
Round 10	Scorecard	4 March	Haryana	Punjab	Haryana won by 2 wickets
Round 11	Scorecard	6 March	Delhi	Haryana	Delhi won by 8 wickets
Round 11	Scorecard	6 March	Mumbai	Kerala	Mumbai won by 7 wickets
Round 11	Scorecard	6 March	Punjab	Tamil Nadu	Punjab won by 89 runs
Round 12	Scorecard	8 March	Andhra	Kerala	Andhra won by 1 run
Round 12	Scorecard	8 March	Chhattisgarh	Tamil Nadu	Tamil Nadu won by 1 wicket
Round 12	Scorecard	8 March	Haryana	Odisha	Odisha won by 2 wickets

==== Elite Group C ====
Round	Scorecard	Date	Team 1	Team 2	Result
Round 1	Scorecard	18 February	Assam	Saurashtra	Saurashtra won by 1 run
Round 1	Scorecard	18 February	Gujarat	Madhya Pradesh	Madhya Pradesh won by 65 runs
Round 1	Scorecard	18 February	Hyderabad	Rajasthan	Rajasthan won by 6 runs
Round 2	Scorecard	19 February	Assam	Uttar Pradesh	Uttar Pradesh won by 53 runs
Round 2	Scorecard	19 February	Hyderabad	Uttarakhand	Hyderabad won by 63 runs
Round 2	Scorecard	19 February	Jharkhand	Madhya Pradesh	Madhya Pradesh won by 5 wickets
Round 3	Scorecard	20 February	Gujarat	Uttarakhand	Gujarat won by 34 runs
Round 3	Scorecard	20 February	Jharkhand	Saurashtra	Jharkhand won by 8 wickets
Round 3	Scorecard	20 February	Rajasthan	Uttar Pradesh	Uttar Pradesh won by 30 runs
Round 4	Scorecard	22 February	Gujarat	Hyderabad	Hyderabad won by 7 wickets
Round 4	Scorecard	22 February	Madhya Pradesh	Rajasthan	Madhya Pradesh won by 8 wickets
Round 4	Scorecard	22 February	Saurashtra	Uttarakhand	Saurashtra won by 57 runs
Round 5	Scorecard	23 February	Assam	Rajasthan	Rajasthan won by 6 wickets
Round 5	Scorecard	23 February	Gujarat	Jharkhand	Jharkhand won by 54 runs
Round 5	Scorecard	23 February	Saurashtra	Uttar Pradesh	Uttar Pradesh won by 8 wickets
Round 6	Scorecard	25 February	Assam	Jharkhand	Jharkhand won by 10 runs
Round 6	Scorecard	25 February	Hyderabad	Uttar Pradesh	Hyderabad won by 2 wickets
Round 6	Scorecard	25 February	Madhya Pradesh	Uttarakhand	Madhya Pradesh won by 8 wickets
Round 7	Scorecard	27 February	Gujarat	Assam	Gujarat won by 1 wicket
Round 7	Scorecard	27 February	Hyderabad	Madhya Pradesh	Madhya Pradesh won by 5 wickets
Round 7	Scorecard	27 February	Rajasthan	Saurashtra	Saurashtra won by 4 wickets
Round 8	Scorecard	29 February	Assam	Uttarakhand	Assam won by 47 runs
Round 8	Scorecard	29 February	Hyderabad	Saurashtra	Hyderabad won by 39 runs
Round 8	Scorecard	29 February	Jharkhand	Uttar Pradesh	Jharkhand won by 9 wickets
Round 9	Scorecard	2 March	Gujarat	Saurashtra	Saurashtra won by 6 wickets
Round 9	Scorecard	2 March	Madhya Pradesh	Uttar Pradesh	Madhya Pradesh won by 53 runs
Round 9	Scorecard	2 March	Rajasthan	Uttarakhand	Rajasthan won by 6 wickets
Round 10	Scorecard	4 March	Assam	Hyderabad	Assam won by 2 wickets
Round 10	Scorecard	4 March	Gujarat	Rajasthan	Gujarat won by 5 wickets
Round 10	Scorecard	4 March	Jharkhand	Uttarakhand	Jharkhand won by 10 wickets
Round 11	Scorecard	6 March	Hyderabad	Jharkhand	Match Abandoned
Round 11	Scorecard	6 March	Madhya Pradesh	Saurashtra	Madhya Pradesh won by 6 wickets
Round 11	Scorecard	6 March	Uttarkhand	Uttar Pradesh	Uttar Pradesh won by 87 runs
Round 12	Scorecard	8 March	Assam	Madhya Pradesh	Madhya Pradesh won by 135 runs
Round 12	Scorecard	8 March	Gujarat	Uttar Pradesh	Uttar Pradesh won by 32 runs
Round 12	Scorecard	8 March	Jharkhand	Rajasthan	Jharkhand won by 103 runs

==== Plate Group ====
Round	Scorecard	Date	Team 1	Team 2	Result
Round 1	Scorecard	18 February	Jammu and Kashmir	Sikkim	Jammu and Kashmir won by 1 run
Round 1	Scorecard	18 February	Meghalaya	Nagaland	Nagaland won by 88 runs
Round 1	Scorecard	18 February	Pondicherry	Manipur	Pondicherry won by 110 runs
Round 2	Scorecard	19 February	Arunachal Pradesh	Nagaland	Nagaland won by 8 wickets
Round 2	Scorecard	19 February	Bihar	Chandigarh	Chandigarh won by 106 runs
Round 2	Scorecard	19 February	Jammu and Kashmir	Mizoram	Jammu and Kashmir won by 3 wickets
Round 3	Scorecard	21 February	Arunachal Pradesh	Bihar	Bihar won by 150 runs
Round 3	Scorecard	21 February	Meghalaya	Sikkim	Meghalaya won by 4 wickets
Round 3	Scorecard	21 February	Mizoram	Nagaland	Nagaland won by 8 wickets
Round 4	Scorecard	22 February	Chandigarh	Jammu and Kashmir	Chandigarh won by 7 wickets
Round 4	Scorecard	22 February	Manipur	Mizoram	Mizoram won by 4 wickets
Round 4	Scorecard	22 February	Pondicherry	Arunachal Pradesh	Pondicherry won by 215 runs (VJD Method)
Round 5	Scorecard	24 February	Arunachal Pradesh	Chandigarh	Chandigarh won by 10 wickets
Round 5	Scorecard	24 February	Manipur	Meghalaya	Meghalaya won by 54 runs
Round 5	Scorecard	24 February	Pondicherry	Nagaland	Pondicherry won by 9 wickets
Round 6	Scorecard	25 February	Bihar	Mizoram	Mizoram won by 5 wickets
Round 6	Scorecard	25 February	Jammu and Kashmir	Manipur	Jammu and Kashmir won by 76 runs
Round 6	Scorecard	25 February	Pondicherry	Sikkim	Pondicherry won by 123 runs
Round 7	Scorecard	27 February	Bihar	Meghalaya	Meghalaya won by 6 wickets
Round 7	Scorecard	27 February	Manipur	Sikkim	Manipur won by 53 runs
Round 7	Scorecard	27 February	Pondicherry	Chandigarh	Chandigarh won by 4 wickets
Round 8	Scorecard	28 February	Arunachal Pradesh	Mizoram	Mizoram won by 9 wickets
Round 8	Scorecard	28 February	Jammu and Kashmir	Meghalaya	Meghalaya won by 8 wickets
Round 8	Scorecard	28 February	Nagaland	Sikkim	Nagaland won by 47 runs
Round 9	Scorecard	1 March	Bihar	Sikkim	Bihar won by 60 runs
Round 9	Scorecard	1 March	Jammu and Kashmir	Nagaland	Nagaland won by 11 runs
Round 9	Scorecard	1 March	Meghalaya	Mizoram	Mizoram won by 1 wicket
Round 10	Scorecard	2 March	Arunachal Pradesh	Manipur	Manipur won by 55 runs
Round 10	Scorecard	2 March	Chandigarh	Meghalaya	Chandigarh won by 149 runs
Round 10	Scorecard	2 March	Pondicherry	Bihar	Pondicherry won by 7 wickets
Round 11	Scorecard	4 March	Bihar	Jammu and Kashmir	Jammu and Kashmir won by 7 wickets
Round 11	Scorecard	4 March	Manipur	Nagaland	Nagaland won by 123 runs
Round 11	Scorecard	4 March	Mizoram	Sikkim	Mizoram won by 9 wickets
Round 12	Scorecard	5 March	Arunachal Pradesh	Meghalaya	[Meghalaya won by 171 runs
Round 12	Scorecard	5 March	Chandigarh	Manipur	Chandigarh won by 7 wickets
Round 12	Scorecard	5 March	Pondicherry	Mizoram	Pondicherry won by 123 runs
Round 13	Scorecard	7 March	Arunachal Pradesh	Jammu and Kashmir	Jammu and Kashmir won by 131 runs
Round 13	Scorecard	7 March	Bihar	Nagaland	Nagaland won by 112 runs
Round 13	Scorecard	7 March	Chandigarh	Sikkim	Chandigarh won by 9 wickets
Round 14	Scorecard	9 March	Bihar	Manipur	Bihar won by 8 wickets
Round 14	Scorecard	9 March	Chandigarh	Mizoram	Chandigarh won by 122 runs
Round 14	Scorecard	9 March	Pondicherry	Meghalaya	Meghalaya won by 35 runs
Round 15	Scorecard	11 March	Arunachal Pradesh	Sikkim	Sikkim won by 79 runs
Round 15	Scorecard	11 March	Chandigarh	Nagaland	Chandigarh won by 118 runs
Round 15	Scorecard	11 March	Pondicherry	Jammu and Kashmir	Jammu and Kashmir won by 4 wickets

== Knockout stage ==
The knockout stages were cancelled just before the quarter-final stage was scheduled to begin, due to the COVID-19 pandemic.
