= 2008–09 Senior Women's One Day League =

- Dates: 21 November – 17 December 2008
- Administrator: BCCI
- Cricket format: List A
- Tournament format(s): Round-robin and final
- Champions: Railways (3rd title)
- Runners-up: Maharashtra
- Participants: 28
- Matches: 87
- Most runs: Mithali Raj (433)
- Most wickets: Preeti Dimri (25)

The 2008–09 Senior Women's One Day League was the third edition of the women's List A cricket competition in India. It took place in November and December 2008, with 28 teams divided into five regional groups. Railways won the tournament, beating Maharashtra in the final, claiming their third consecutive title.

== Competition format ==
The 28 teams competing in the tournament were divided into five zonal groups: Central, East, North, South and West. The tournament operated on a round-robin format, with each team playing every other team in their group once. The top two sides from each group progressed to the Super League round, where the 10 remaining teams were divided into two further round-robin groups. The winner of each group progressed to the final. Matches were played using a 50 over format.

The groups worked on a points system with positions with the groups being based on the total points. Points were awarded as follows:

Win: 4 points.
Tie: 2 points.
Loss: –1 points.
No Result/Abandoned: 2 points.
Bonus Points: 1 point available per match.
Consolation Points: 1 point available per match.

If points in the final table are equal, teams are separated by most wins, then head-to-head record, then number of Bonus Points, then Net Run Rate.

== Zonal Tables ==
=== Central Zone ===
Team	P	W	L	T	NR	BP	CP	Pts	NRR
Railways (Q)	4	4	0	0	0	4	0	20	+3.664
Uttar Pradesh (Q)	4	2	1	1	0	2	0	11	+0.935
Madhya Pradesh	4	2	1	1	0	2	0	11	–0.281
Vidarbha	4	1	3	0	0	0	0	1	–1.738
Rajasthan	4	0	4	0	0	0	1	–3	–2.609

=== East Zone ===
Team	P	W	L	T	NR	BP	CP	Pts	NRR
Bengal (Q)	6	6	0	0	0	6	0	30	+3.294
Jharkhand (Q)	6	5	1	0	0	4	0	23	+1.755
Orissa	6	4	2	0	0	4	1	19	+1.260
Assam	6	2	4	0	0	1	1	6	–0.564
Manipur	6	2	4	0	0	1	1	6	–0.751
Tripura	6	2	4	0	0	1	1	6	–1.166
Sikkim	6	0	6	0	0	0	0	–6	–4.234

=== North Zone ===
Team	P	W	L	T	NR	BP	CP	Pts	NRR
Delhi (Q)	4	4	0	0	0	3	0	19	+1.546
Punjab (Q)	4	3	1	0	0	3	1	15	+2.204
Haryana	4	2	2	0	0	0	0	6	–0.698
Himachal Pradesh	4	1	3	0	0	0	1	2	–1.394
Jammu and Kashmir	4	0	4	0	0	0	2	–2	–1.463

=== South Zone ===
Team	P	W	L	T	NR	BP	CP	Pts	NRR
Hyderabad (Q)	5	4	0	0	1	3	0	21	+1.643
Tamil Nadu (Q)	5	3	1	0	1	3	1	17	+1.665
Karnataka	5	3	1	0	1	3	0	16	+1.280
Andhra	5	1	3	0	1	1	0	4	–1.117
Goa	5	1	3	0	1	1	0	4	–1.279
Kerala	5	0	4	0	1	0	0	–2	–1.919

=== West Zone ===
Team	P	W	L	T	NR	BP	CP	Pts	NRR
Maharashtra(Q)	4	4	0	0	0	3	0	19	+2.294
Mumbai (Q)	4	3	1	0	0	3	1	15	+2.635
Gujarat	4	2	2	0	0	1	0	7	–0.920
Baroda	4	1	3	0	0	1	1	3	–1.361
Saurashtra	4	0	4	0	0	0	0	–4	–1.839

Source:CricketArchive

== Super Leagues ==
=== Super League Group A ===
Team	P	W	L	T	NR	BP	CP	Pts	NRR
Maharashtra (Q)	4	4	0	0	0	3	0	19	+1.530
Delhi	4	3	1	0	0	1	0	12	–0.115
Bengal	4	2	2	0	0	1	1	8	–0.102
Tamil Nadu	4	1	3	0	0	1	2	4	+0.393
Uttar Pradesh	4	0	4	0	0	0	1	–3	–1.736

=== Super League Group B ===
Team	P	W	L	T	NR	BP	CP	Pts	NRR
Railways (Q)	4	4	0	0	0	4	0	20	+1.812
Hyderabad	4	3	1	0	0	2	0	13	+0.258
Mumbai	4	2	2	0	0	2	1	9	+0.436
Punjab	4	1	3	0	0	0	0	1	–1.124
Jharkhand	4	0	4	0	0	0	1	–3	–1.206

Source:CricketArchive

== Final ==
17 December 2008
Scorecard

Maharashtra; 153/9 (50 overs)	v	Railways; 154/0 (30.4 overs)
Devika Palshikar 50 (61); Preeti Dimri 3/29 (10 overs)		Sulakshana Naik 85* (89)

Railways won by 10 wickets
Rajiv Gandhi International Cricket Stadium, Hyderabad
Umpires: Kiran Anja and Vilas Bandiwadekar

- Maharashtra won the toss and elected to bat.

== Statistics ==
=== Most runs ===
Player	Team	Matches	Innings	Runs	Average	HS	100s	50s
Mithali Raj	Railways	9	6	433	108.25	163*	2	1
Riya Chowdhury	Bengal	9	9	430	53.75	129	2	1
Punam Raut	Mumbai	8	8	428	85.60	131*	1	3
Thirush Kamini	Tamil Nadu	8	8	419	59.85	152	1	3
Jaya Sharma	Railways	8	8	364	52.00	92	0	4

Source: CricketArchive

=== Most wickets ===
Player	Team	Overs	Wickets	Average	BBI	5w
Preeti Dimri	Railways	83.3	25	5.84	5/9	1
Nancy Daruwalla	Mumbai	76.0	19	11.21	4/18	0
Jhulan Goswami	Bengal	73.0	18	7.72	4/1	0
Gouher Sultana	Hyderabad	68.1	17	8.11	3/4	0
Soniya Dabir	Maharashtra	49.4	16	10.56	5/51	1

Source: CricketArchive
