= Kiran Navgire =

Indian cricketer (born 1994)

Personal information
- Full name: Kiran Prabhu Navgire
- Born: 18 September 1994 (age 32); Solapur, Maharashtra, India
- Batting: Right-handed
- Role: Batter

International information
- National side: India (2022–present)
- T20I debut (cap 71): 10 September 2022 v England
- Last T20I: 10 October 2022 v Thailand

Domestic team information
- Years: Team
- 2018/19–2019/20: Maharashtra
- 2021/22–present: Nagaland
- 2022–2023: Velocity
- 2023–present: UP Warriorz

Career statistics
Competition	WT20I
Matches	6
Runs scored	17
Batting average	5.66
100s/50s	0/0
Top score	10*
Catches/stumpings	0/–
- Source: ESPNcricinfo, 10 October 2022

Kiran Prabhu Navgire (born 18 September 1994) is an Indian cricketer. She currently plays for India women and Nagaland women. She set the record for the highest individual score in Women's Senior T20 Trophy, when she made an unbeaten 162 for Nagaland against Arunachal Pradesh in 2022. She is the only Indian cricketer (male or female) to score over 150 runs in a T20 match.

Kiran Navgire's father is a farmer while her mother is a homemaker. She has two brothers. She had initially been into athletics, before pursuing a career as a cricketer. She first played cricket during her graduation days at the Savitribai Phule Pune University. She represented the university cricket team from the 2013–14 to 2015–16 seasons without any formal training. She had also represented Pune University in javelin throw, shot put and 100 meters competitions. She received her first formal training at the Azam Campus in Pune, where she enrolled in a two-year course in physical education.

She began her domestic career with Maharashtra in the 2018–19 Senior Women's One Day League. She later decided to play for Nagaland as a guest player in the 2021-22 Women's Senior T20 Trophy as she could not get enough chances in the Maharashtra team. While playing for Nagaland, she scored 162 off 76 balls against Arunachal Pradesh at Barsapara Stadium, Guwahati on 15 April 2022, becoming the first Indian man or woman to score 150+ runs in a Twenty20 innings.

She was picked in the Velocity squad ahead of the 2022 Women's T20 Challenge. On her debut against Trailblazers on 26 May 2022, she scored a 24-ball fifty, which is the fastest fifty in the Women's T20 Challenge. Two days later, she scored a 13-ball duck in the final. Later, she was also picked for the Indian women's team for the T20 international series against England in September 2022. She completed her education in Baramati Sharda vidyalaya. She is inspired by the movie Bhag Milkha Bhag and ran 40 rounds around her college.

== Filmography ==
Year	Film	Role	Notes
2023	Ghoomer	Coach	
