= Kashvee Gautam =

Indian cricketer (born 2003)

Personal information
- Full name: Kashvee Gautam
- Born: 18 April 2003 (age 23); Chandigarh, Punjab, India
- Batting: Right-handed
- Bowling: Right-arm medium
- Role: Bowler

International information
- National side: India (2025–present)
- Only Test (cap 95): 6 March 2026 v Australia
- ODI debut (cap 153): 27 April 2025 v Sri Lanka
- Last ODI: 29 April 2025 v South Africa
- ODI shirt no.: 81

Domestic team information
- Years: Team
- 2024–present: Chandigarh
- 2024–present: Gujarat Giants

Career statistics
Competition	ODI	FC	LA	T20
Matches	3	3	28	40
Runs scored	22	194	307	344
Batting average	22.00	64.66	13.95	17.20
100s/50s	0/0	1/0	0/2	0/0
Top score	17	106*	64*	35*
Balls bowled	122	252	1,251	811
Wickets	0	4	23	42
Bowling average	–	28.75	35.60	18.92
5 wickets in innings	–	0	0	1
10 wickets in match	–	0	0	0
Best bowling	–	3/57	3/19	5/8
Catches/stumpings	0/–	1/–	5/–	5/–
- Source: CricketArchive, 6 August 2025

Kashvee Gautam (born 18 April 2003) is an Indian cricketer who represents the India women's national team. She plays for Gujarat Giants in the Women's Premier League and for Chandigarh in domestic cricket.

== Domestic career ==
In the second WPL auction in December 2023, Gautam was purchased by the Gujarat Giants franchise for ₹ 2 crore. But, later she was ruled out of the tournament of 2024 season due to injury. After recovering from injury, she was able to play 2025 WPL.

In 2020, she was selected by the IPL Trailblazers for the 2020 Women's T20 Challenge. In 2023, she also named in India A squad for the Emerging Women's Asia Cup. She played domestic cricket for Chandigarh women's cricket team. She took her maiden five-wicket haul for North Zone against North East Zone in Women's Inter-Zonal Twenty20 Competition 2023/24, on 24 November 2023 and named in India A team for the series against England.

== International career ==
In April 2025, she was named in India's national squad for the ODI Tri-Series against Sri Lanka and South Africa. She made her ODI debut against Sri Lanka, on 27 April 2025. On 6 May 2025, she was ruled out of the tournament due to injury.
