= Karu Jain =

Indian cricketer (born 1985)

Karuna Jain
Personal information
- Full name: Karuna Jain
- Born: 9 September 1985 (age 41); Bengaluru, Karnataka, India
- Batting: Right-handed
- Bowling: Right-arm off break
- Role: Wicket-keeper

International information
- National side: India (2004–2014)
- Test debut (cap 65): 21 November 2005 v England
- Last Test: 13 August 2014 v England
- ODI debut (cap 75): 6 March 2004 v West Indies
- Last ODI: 23 August 2014 v England
- T20I debut (cap 46): 28 January 2014 v Sri Lanka
- Last T20I: 2 April 2014 v Pakistan

Domestic team information
- Years: Team
- 2001/02: Karnataka
- 2002/03–2004/05: Air India
- 2006/07–2017/18: Karnataka
- 2018/19: Nagaland
- 2019/20–2021/22: Pondicherry

Career statistics
Competition	WTest	WODI	WT20I	WLA
Matches	5	44	9	197
Runs scored	195	987	9	5,645
Batting average	21.66	29.02	4.50	35.72
100s/50s	0/0	1/9	0/0	5/42
Top score	40	103	8*	126*
Balls bowled	–	–	–	298
Wickets	–	–	–	6
Bowling average	–	–	–	26.66
5 wickets in innings	–	–	–	0
10 wickets in match	–	–	–	0
Best bowling	–	–	–	2/10
Catches/stumpings	14/3	32/26	4/8	144/101
- Source: CricketArchive, 25 July 2022

Karuna "Karu" Jain (born 9 September 1985) is an Indian former cricketer who played as a wicket-keeper and right-handed batter. She appeared in five Test matches, 44 One Day Internationals and nine Twenty20 Internationals for India from 2004 to 2014. She scored one century and nine fifties in ODIs. She played domestic cricket for Karnataka, Air India, Nagaland and Pondicherry. She retired from cricket in July 2022.

== Early life ==
She was born in a family that appreciates sports. Her father was a competitive boxer and her mother played ball badminton.
