= Priyanka Bala =

Indian cricketer (born 1995)

Personal information
- Born: 28 March 1995 (age 31); West Bengal
- Batting: Right-handed
- Bowling: Right-arm medium
- Role: All-rounder

Domestic team information
- Years: Team
- Railways; Bengal
- 2023–present: Mumbai Indians

Career statistics
Competition
Matches
Runs scored
Batting average
100s/50s
Top score
Balls bowled
Wickets
Bowling average
5 wickets in innings
10 wickets in match
Best bowling
Catches/stumpings
- Source: ESPN Cricinfo, 8 June 2023

Priyanka Bala (born 30 September 1995) is an Indian cricketer who currently plays for Bengal. She plays as a right-arm medium fast bowler and right-handed batter. In the inaugural WPL auction in February 2023, Bala was purchased by Mumbai Indians franchise at 20 lakhs.
