= Archana Das =

Indian cricketer (born 1988)

Personal information
- Full name: Archana Das
- Born: 21 July 1988 (age 38); Bardhaman, West Bengal
- Batting: Right-handed
- Bowling: Right arm offbreak

International information
- National side: India
- ODI debut (cap 99): 29 February 2012 v West Indies
- Last ODI: 12 April 2013 v Bangladesh
- T20I debut (cap 29): 18 February 2012 v West Indies
- Last T20I: 1 April 2014 v West Indies

Career statistics
| Competition | WODI | WT20I |
|---|---|---|
| Matches | 11 | 23 |
| Runs scored | 35 | 8 |
| Batting average | 11.66 | 2.66 |
| 100s/50s | 0/0 | 0/0 |
| Top score | 17* | 2* |
| Balls bowled | 567 | 367 |
| Wickets | 13 | 13 |
| Bowling average | 27.53 | 28.23 |
| 5 wickets in innings | 0 | 0 |
| 10 wickets in match | 0 | 0 |
| Best bowling | 4/61 | 3/8 |
| Catches/stumpings | 1/– | 4/– |
- Source: ESPNcricinfo, 1 October 2021

Archana Das (born 21 July 1988) is an Indian cricketer. She represented India from Cricket Association of Bengal and played in 11 Women's One Day International and 23 Women's Twenty20 International matches for the India women's cricket team between 2012 and 2014. In domestic cricket, she played for Bengal women’s cricket team from 2009-2012, Indian Railways from 2012-2015 and Sikkim women's cricket team from 2018-2020.
