= Chandigarh women's cricket team =

Indian women's cricket team

Chandigarh Women
Team information
- Founded: 1973

History
- WSODT wins: 0
- SWTL wins: 0

The Chandigarh women's cricket team is a women's cricket team that represents the Indian union territory of Chandigarh. They played their first match in 1973, and joined the Indian domestic system in 2019–20, competing in the Women's Senior One Day Trophy and the Senior Women's T20 League.

== History ==
Chandigarh Women played their first recorded match in 1973, against Punjab. They went on to play in the Senior National Women's Cricket Championship in 1986–87 and the Indira Priyadarshini Champions Trophy in 1993–94, but full results are not recorded.

In 2019, the Union Territory Cricket Association, the governing body of cricket in Chandigarh, received affiliation from the BCCI, allowing Chandigarh to join the Indian women's domestic system. In the 2019–20 season, they competed in the Senior Women's One Day League and the Senior Women's T20 League. They finished 6th in their group in the T20 League, but won the Plate Competition in the One Day League, winning all 9 of their games to gain promotion to the Elite Competition.

The following season, 2020–21, with only the One Day competition going ahead, Chandigarh finished 5th out of 6 teams in Group C of the Elite Competition. The side won one match across the two competitions in 2021–22, beating Karnataka in the T20 Trophy. In 2022–23, Chandigarh won two matches in each of the two competitions.

== Players ==
=== Notable players ===
Players who have played for Chandigarh and played internationally are listed below, in order of first international appearance (given in brackets):

- (India) Amanjot Kaur (2023)
- (India) Kashvee Gautam (2025)

== Seasons ==
=== Women's Senior One Day Trophy ===
Season	Division	League standings								Notes
Season	Division	P	W	L	T	NR	NRR	Pts	Pos	Notes
2019–20	Plate	9	9	0	0	0	+2.073	36	1st	Promoted
2020–21	Elite Group C	5	1	4	0	0	–0.606	4	5th	
2021–22	Elite Group B	5	0	5	0	0	–2.273	0	6th	
2022–23	Group B	7	2	5	0	0	–1.406	8	7th	
2023–24	Group A	7	2	3	0	2	–0.268	12	6th	
2024–25	Group E	6	3	3	0	0	–0.213	12	4th	

=== Senior Women's T20 League ===
Season	Division	League standings								Notes
Season	Division	P	W	L	T	NR	NRR	Pts	Pos	Notes
2019–20	Group D	7	2	4	0	1	−0.442	10	6th	
2021–22	Elite Group C	5	1	4	0	0	–0.505	4	5th	
2022–23	Group C	6	2	4	0	0	–0.761	8	6th	

== Honours ==
- Women's Senior One Day Trophy:
  - Plate Champions (1): 2019–20

== See also ==
- Chandigarh cricket team
