= Sabbhineni Meghana =

Indian cricketer

Sabbineni Meghana
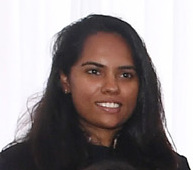
- Meghana in August 2022

Personal information
- Full name: Sabbineni Meghana
- Born: 7 June 1996 (age 30); Krishna, Andhra Pradesh, India
- Batting: Right-handed
- Bowling: Right-arm medium
- Role: Batter

International information
- National side: India (2016–present)
- ODI debut (cap 135): 12 February 2022 v New Zealand
- Last ODI: 18 February 2022 v New Zealand
- ODI shirt no.: 27
- T20I debut (cap 53): 20 November 2016 v West Indies
- Last T20I: 10 October 2022 v Thailand
- T20I shirt no.: 27

Domestic team information
- Years: Team
- 2009/10–2016/17: Andhra
- 2014/15–2016/17: South Zone
- 2017/18–present: Railways
- 2022: Trailblazers
- 2023: Gujarat Giants
- 2024-present: Royal Challengers Bangalore

Career statistics
Competition	WODI	WT20I	WLA	WT20
Matches	3	17	65	80
Runs scored	114	258	1,848	1,545
Batting average	38.00	18.42	31.32	24.14
100s/50s	0/1	0/1	2/13	0/8
Top score	61	69	142	84
Balls bowled	–	–	1,092	701
Wickets	–	–	18	30
Bowling average	–	–	29.72	18.00
5 wickets in innings	–	–	0	0
10 wickets in match	–	–	0	0
Best bowling	–	–	2/23	2/2
Catches/stumpings	1/–	4/–	17/–	19/–
Medal record
Representing India
Women's Cricket
Commonwealth Games
Silver medal – second place	2022 Birmingham	Team
- Source: ESPNcricinfo, 18 October 2022

Sabbineni Meghana (born 7 June 1996) is an Indian cricketer who currently plays for Railways and India primarily as a right-handed batter. She has previously played for Andhra and South Zone.

She was part of India's victorious team in the 2016 Women's Twenty20 Asia Cup. She was the leading run-scorer in the 2021–22 Women's Senior One Day Trophy, with 388 runs including one century and two half-centuries.

In January 2022, she was named as one of three reserve players in India's team for the 2022 Women's Cricket World Cup in New Zealand. She made her Women's One Day International (WODI) debut on 12 February 2022, for India against New Zealand.

In July 2022, she was named in India's team for the cricket tournament at the 2022 Commonwealth Games in Birmingham, England.

In December 2023, she was signed by Royal Challengers Bangalore at the Women's Premier League auction, for the 2024 season.
