= Mizoram women's cricket team =

Indian women's cricket team

Mizoram Women

Personnel
- Captain: Apurwa Bhardwaj

Team information
- Founded: 2018

History
- WSODT wins: 0
- SWTL wins: 0

The Mizoram women's cricket team is a women's cricket team that represents the Indian state of Mizoram in domestic cricket. They were formed ahead of the 2018–19 season, and compete in the Women's Senior One Day Trophy and the Senior Women's T20 League.

== History ==
Mizoram Women were formed ahead of the 2018–19 season, after an expansion of teams in Indian domestic cricket. In their first season, they competed in the Senior Women's One Day League and in the Senior Women's T20 League, finishing bottom of their group in both competitions.

The following season, 2019–20, Mizoram finished 6th in the Plate competition of the Senior Women's One Day League and 7th in their Senior Women's T20 League group. In the 2020–21 season, with only the One Day League going ahead, Mizoram won the Plate competition, with 5 wins from their six games, and gained promotion to the Elite Group for the following season, but were eliminated from the knockout stages in the subsequent play-off against Odisha. Mizoram batter Buley Ruchita was the fourth-highest run-scorer across the whole competition, with 332 runs at an average of 66.40. They finished sixth in their group in both competitions in 2021–22. They won one match in each of the two competitions in 2022–23.

== Seasons ==
=== Women's Senior One Day Trophy ===
Season	Division	League standings								Notes
Season	Division	P	W	L	T	NR	NRR	Pts	Pos	Notes
2018–19	Plate	8	1	7	0	0	–3.061	4	9th	
2019–20	Plate	9	4	5	0	0	–0.499	16	6th	
2020–21	Plate	6	5	1	0	0	+0.463	20	1st	Promoted
2021–22	Elite Group D	5	0	5	0	0	–4.417	0	6th	
2022–23	Group A	7	1	6	0	0	–2.229	4	7th	

=== Senior Women's T20 League ===
Season	Division	League standings								Notes
Season	Division	P	W	L	T	NR	NRR	Pts	Pos	Notes
2018–19	Group E	7	0	7	0	0	−7.154	0	8th	
2019–20	Group E	7	1	6	0	0	−3.726	4	7th	
2021–22	Plate	6	1	5	0	0	–0.129	5	6th	
2022–23	Group A	7	1	6	0	0	–2.181	4	8th	

== See also ==
- Mizoram cricket team
