= Manipur women's cricket team =

Indian women's cricket team

Manipur Women
Personnel
- Captain: Ganga Waikhom

Team information
- Founded: 2008

History
- WSODT wins: 0
- SWTL wins: 0

The Manipur women's cricket team is a women's cricket team that represents the Indian state of Manipur. They were formed in 2008, competing in the 2008–09 Indian domestic system, before returning in the 2018–19 season, and have competed in the Women's Senior One Day Trophy and the Senior Women's T20 League ever since.

== History ==
Manipur Women first played in the 2008–09 season, competing across first-class, one-day and T20 competitions. They finished sixth out of seven in their group in the first-class competition and fifth out of seven in the One Day Trophy, whilst results for the T20 competition are not recorded.

The team permanently joined the full Indian domestic system ahead of the 2018–19 season, after an expansion of teams in Indian domestic cricket. That season, they again competed in the Senior Women's One Day League, finishing 5th out of 9 in the Plate competition, and in the Senior Women's T20 League, finishing bottom of their group.

The following season, 2019–20, Manipur finished 8th out of 10 in the Plate competition of the Senior Women's One Day League and again finished bottom of Group D in the Senior Women's T20 League. The following season, 2020–21, with only the One Day League going ahead, Manipur finished 5th in the Plate competition, winning two of their six matches. In 2021–22, they finished fifth in their group in the One Day Trophy and 4th in the T20 Trophy. In 2022–23, the side finished bottom of their group in both competitions.

== Seasons ==
=== Women's Senior One Day Trophy ===
Season	Division	League standings								Notes
Season	Division	P	W	L	T	NR	NRR	Pts	Pos	Notes
2008–09	East Zone	6	2	4	0	0	–0.751	6	5th	
2018–19	Plate	8	4	3	0	1	+1.018	18	5th	
2019–20	Plate	9	2	7	0	0	–1.040	8	8th	
2020–21	Plate	6	2	4	0	0	–0.116	8	5th	
2021–22	Plate	6	3	3	0	0	–0.291	12	5th	
2022–23	Group E	6	0	6	0	0	–3.192	0	7th	

=== Senior Women's T20 League ===
Season	Division	League standings								Notes
Season	Division	P	W	L	T	NR	NRR	Pts	Pos	Notes
2018–19	Group A	6	0	6	0	0	−4.540	0	7th	
2019–20	Group E	7	0	6	0	1	−5.455	2	8th	
2021–22	Plate	6	3	3	0	0	–0.635	12	4th	
2022–23	Group D	6	0	4	0	2	–4.733	4	7th	

== See also ==
- Manipur cricket team
