= Arunachal Pradesh women's cricket team =

Indian women's cricket team

Arunachal Pradesh Women
Personnel
- Captain: Bengia Ritu

Team information
- Founded: 2012

History
- WSODT wins: 0
- WSTT wins: 0

The Arunachal Pradesh women's cricket team is a women's cricket team that represents the Indian state of Arunachal Pradesh. They were formed in 2012, and have competed in the Indian women's domestic system since the 2018–19 season, in the Women's Senior One Day Trophy and the Women's Senior T20 Trophy.

== History ==
Arunachal Pradesh Women first played in 2012, in the BCCI Associate Members Women's Tournament, playing four matches, losing three with one match abandoned. The team joined the full Indian domestic system ahead of the 2018–19 season, after an expansion of teams in Indian domestic cricket. In their first season, they competed in the Senior Women's One Day League, finishing 8th out of 9 in the Plate competition, and in the Senior Women's T20 League, finishing bottom of their group.

The following season, 2019–20, Arunachal Pradesh finished bottom of the table in both the Plate competition of the Senior Women's One Day League and Group E of the Senior Women's T20 League. The following season, 2020–21, with only the One Day League going ahead, Arunachal Pradesh again finished bottom of their group, losing all seven of their matches. They finished bottom of their group in both tournaments in 2021–22 as well as 2022–23. Arunachal Pradesh have only ever won one match to date, a 34-run victory over Sikkim in the 2018–19 One Day League.

== Seasons ==
=== Women's Senior One Day Trophy ===
Season	Division	League standings								Notes
Season	Division	P	W	L	T	NR	NRR	Pts	Pos	Notes
2018–19	Plate	8	1	7	0	0	–3.021	4	8th	
2019–20	Plate	9	0	9	0	0	–2.655	0	10th	
2020–21	Plate	6	0	6	0	0	–2.180	0	7th	
2021–22	Plate	6	0	6	0	0	–1.448	0	7th	
2022–23	Group B	7	0	7	0	0	–2.843	0	8th	

=== Senior Women's T20 League ===
Season	Division	League standings								Notes
Season	Division	P	W	L	T	NR	NRR	Pts	Pos	Notes
2018–19	Group C	6	0	6	0	0	−6.125	0	7th	
2019–20	Group E	7	0	7	0	0	−6.502	0	8th	
2021–22	Plate	6	0	6	0	0	–3.367	0	7th	
2022–23	Group B	7	0	6	0	1	–4.524	2	8th	

== See also ==
- Arunachal Pradesh cricket team
