= Meghalaya women's cricket team =

Indian women's cricket team

Meghalaya Women
Personnel
- Captain: Debasmita Dutta

Team information
- Founded: 2012

History
- WSODT wins: 0
- SWTL wins: 0

The Meghalaya women's cricket team is a women's cricket team that represents the Indian state of Meghalaya. They were formed in 2012, and have competed in the Indian women's domestic system since the 2018–19 season, in the Women's Senior One Day Trophy and the Senior Women's T20 League.

== History ==
Meghalaya Women first played in 2012, in the BCCI Associate Members Women's Tournament, playing four matches, losing two with the other two matches curtailed by rain. The team joined the full Indian domestic system ahead of the 2018–19 season, after an expansion of teams in Indian domestic cricket. In their first season, they competed in the Senior Women's One Day League, finishing 3rd out of 9 in the Plate competition, and in the Senior Women's T20 League, finishing 6th out of 7 in their group.

In the 2019–20 season, Meghalaya again finished 6th in their group in the Senior Women's T20 League. However, in the Senior Women's One Day League, the team finished 3rd in the Plate Competition and gained promotion, with 7 wins from their 9 matches. The following season, 2020–21, with only the One Day League going ahead, Meghalaya finished bottom of Group E in the Elite Competition, losing all five of their matches, and were relegated to the Plate Group. They finished third in the Plate Group of the One Day Trophy in 2021–22, but lost all of their matches in Elite Group A of the T20 Trophy. In 2022–23, the side won just one match in the T20 Trophy, and none in the One Day Trophy.

== Seasons ==
=== Women's Senior One Day Trophy ===
Season	Division	League standings								Notes
Season	Division	P	W	L	T	NR	NRR	Pts	Pos	Notes
2018–19	Plate	8	5	1	1	1	+1.737	24	3rd	
2019–20	Plate	9	7	2	0	0	+0.408	28	3rd	Promoted
2020–21	Elite Group E	5	0	5	0	0	–4.575	0	6th	Relegated
2021–22	Plate	6	4	2	0	0	+0.025	16	3rd	
2022–23	Group C	6	0	6	0	0	–2.318	0	7th	

=== Senior Women's T20 League ===
Season	Division	League standings								Notes
Season	Division	P	W	L	T	NR	NRR	Pts	Pos	Notes
2018–19	Group C	6	1	5	0	0	−3.466	4	6th	
2019–20	Group A	6	1	4	0	1	−3.585	6	6th	
2021–22	Elite Group A	5	0	5	0	0	–4.609	0	6th	
2022–23	Group A	7	1	5	0	1	–1.785	6	7th	

== See also ==
- Meghalaya cricket team
