= Nagaland women's cricket team =

Indian women's cricket team

Nagaland Women
Personnel
- Captain: Sentilemla Imsong

Team information
- Founded: 2018

History
- WSODT wins: 0
- SWTL wins: 0

The Nagaland women's cricket team is a women's cricket team that represents the Indian state of Nagaland. They were formed ahead of the 2018–19 season, and compete in the Women's Senior One Day Trophy and the Senior Women's T20 League.

== History ==
Nagaland Women were formed ahead of the 2018–19 season, after an expansion of teams in Indian domestic cricket. In their first season, they competed in the Senior Women's One Day League, where they finished 4th in the Plate Competition with 5 wins, and in the Senior Women's T20 League, where they finished bottom of their group.

The following season, 2019–20, Nagaland finished 2nd in the Plate Competition of the Senior Women's One Day League, therefore gaining promotion. However, they again finished bottom of their Senior Women's T20 League group. The following season, 2020–21, with only the One Day League going ahead, Nagaland finished bottom of the Elite Competition Group D, losing all five of their matches, therefore being relegated to the Plate Group. In 2021–22, they finished second in the Plate Group of the One Day Trophy, whilst they won the Plate Group of the T20 Trophy, therefore progressing to the knockout stages. They lost their first knockout match, by 7 wickets to Kerala. Nagaland batter Kiran Navgire was the leading run-scorer in the competition, with 525 runs, including a 162* in the opening round of the tournament. In 2022–23, Nagaland won two matches in each of the two competitions.

== Players ==
=== Notable players ===
Players who have played for Nagaland and played internationally are listed below, in order of first international appearance (given in brackets):

- (India) Karu Jain (2004)
- (India) Kiran Navgire (2022)

== Seasons ==
=== Women's Senior One Day Trophy ===
Season	Division	League standings								Notes
Season	Division	P	W	L	T	NR	NRR	Pts	Pos	Notes
2018–19	Plate	8	5	3	0	0	+0.654	20	4th	
2019–20	Plate	9	7	2	0	0	+0.808	28	2nd	Promoted
2020–21	Elite Group D	5	0	5	0	0	–8.490	0	6th	Relegated
2021–22	Plate	6	5	1	0	0	+1.021	20	2nd	
2022–23	Group B	7	2	5	0	0	–0.306	8	6th	

=== Senior Women's T20 League ===
Season	Division	League standings								Notes
Season	Division	P	W	L	T	NR	NRR	Pts	Pos	Notes
2018–19	Group B	6	0	6	0	0	−4.494	0	7th	
2019–20	Group C	6	0	6	0	0	−3.726	0	7th	
2021–22	Plate	6	6	0	0	0	+2.690	24	1st	Lost pre-quarter-final
2022–23	Group A	7	2	4	0	1	–0.310	10	6th	

== See also ==
- Nagaland cricket team
