= Pondicherry women's cricket team =

Indian women's cricket team

Pondicherry Women
Personnel
- Captain: Mugdha Joshi

Team information
- Founded: 2018 (8 years ago)
- Home ground: Cricket Association Pondicherry Ground, Puducherry; Sree Lakshmi Narayana Institute of Medical Sciences Cricket Ground, Puducherry

History
- WSODT wins: 0
- SWTL wins: 0

The Pondicherry women's cricket team, also known as Puducherry women's cricket team, is a women's cricket team that represents the Indian union territory of Puducherry. They were formed ahead of the 2018–19 season, and have competed in both the Women's Senior One Day Trophy and the Senior Women's T20 League since that season.

== History ==
Pondicherry Women were formed ahead of the 2018–19 season, after an expansion of teams in Indian domestic cricket. In their first season, they competed in the Senior Women's One Day League, finishing 2nd in the Plate competition, and in the Senior Women's T20 League, finishing 7th out of 8 teams in their group.

The following season, 2019–20, Pondicherry finished 5th in the Plate competition of the Senior Women's One Day League and 6th in their Senior Women's T20 League group. The following season, 2020–21, with only the One Day League going ahead, Pondicherry finished 2nd in the Plate competition, with 5 wins from their six games, gaining promotion to the Elite Group. Pondicherry bowler Amruta Saran was the joint-second highest wicket-taker across the whole competition, with 16 wickets at an average of 11.43. In 2021–22, they failed to qualify for the knockout stages of the Plate Group in both competitions. In 2022–23, the side finished 5th in their group in both competitions.

== Players ==
=== Notable players ===
Players who have played for Pondicherry and played internationally are listed below, in order of first international appearance (given in brackets):

- (India) Karu Jain (2004)
- (India) Gouher Sultana (2008)
- (India) Anagha Deshpande (2008)
- (India) Latika Kumari (2009)
- (India) Asha Sobhana (2024)

== Seasons ==
=== Women's Senior One Day Trophy ===
Season	Division	League standings								Notes
Season	Division	P	W	L	T	NR	NRR	Pts	Pos	Notes
2018–19	Plate	8	7	1	0	0	+1.548	28	2nd	
2019–20	Plate	9	6	3	0	0	+1.500	24	5th	
2020–21	Plate	6	5	1	0	0	+1.386	20	2nd	Promoted
2021–22	Elite Group E	5	0	5	0	0	–2.173	0	6th	
2022–23	Group C	6	2	4	0	0	–1.374	8	5th	

=== Senior Women's T20 League ===
Season	Division	League standings								Notes
Season	Division	P	W	L	T	NR	NRR	Pts	Pos	Notes
2018–19	Group E	7	1	6	0	0	−0.835	4	7th	
2019–20	Group C	6	1	5	0	0	−2.452	4	6th	
2021–22	Plate	6	4	2	0	0	+1.025	16	3rd	
2022–23	Group C	6	3	3	0	0	–0.348	12	5th	

== See also ==
- Pondicherry cricket team
