= Sikkim women's cricket team =

Indian women's cricket team

Sikkim Women
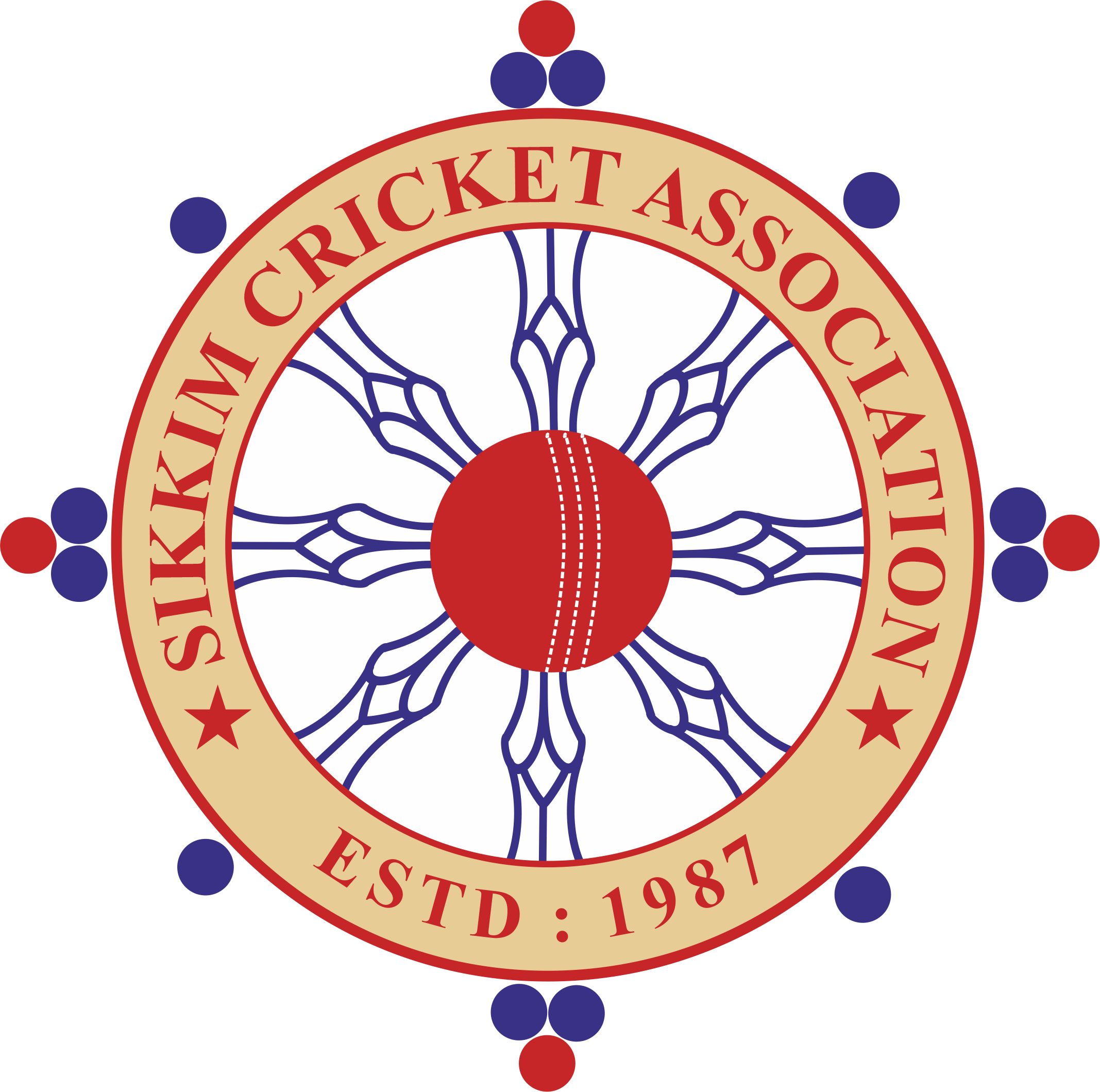

Personnel
- Captain: Sarika Koli

Team information
- Founded: 2007

History
- WSODT wins: 0
- SWTL wins: 0

The Sikkim women's cricket team is a women's cricket team that represents the Indian state of Sikkim. They first competed in the Indian domestic system in 2007–08 and 2008–09, before returning ahead of the 2018–19 season, and now compete in the Women's Senior One Day Trophy and the Women's Senior T20 League.

== History ==
Sikkim Women first played in the 2007–08 season, competing in first-class and one-day competitions. They finished bottom of their group in the first-class competition and 4th in their group in the One Day Trophy, with one victory. The following season, 2008–09, they finished bottom of their group in both the first-class and one-day competitions, as well as competing in a T20 competition, but the results are not recorded.

After a ten-year break, Sikkim rejoined the Indian domestic system ahead of the 2018–19 season, after an expansion of teams in Indian domestic cricket. In their first season after their return, they competed in the Senior Women's One Day League, where they finished 6th in the Plate Competition with 2 wins, and in the Senior Women's T20 League, where they finished 6th out of 7 in their group.

The following season, 2019–20, Sikkim finished 9th in the Plate Competition of the Senior Women's One Day League, and again finished 6th in their Senior Women's T20 League group. The following season, 2020–21, with only the One Day League going ahead, Sikkim finished 6th in the Plate Competition, winning 2 of their 6 matches. They again finished 6th in their group in the one-day competition in 2021–22, whilst they finished 5th with two wins in their T20 Trophy group. They finished bottom of their group in both competitions in 2022–23.

== Players ==
=== Notable players ===
Players who have played for Sikkim and played internationally are listed below, in order of first international appearance (given in brackets):

- (India) Archana Das (2012)

== Seasons ==
=== Women's Senior One Day Trophy ===
Season	Division	League standings								Notes
Season	Division	P	W	L	T	NR	NRR	Pts	Pos	Notes
2007–08	East Zone	5	1	3	0	1	–0.762	4	4th	
2008–09	East Zone	6	0	6	0	0	–4.234	–6	7th	
2018–19	Plate	8	2	1	5	0	+0.186	10	6th	
2019–20	Plate	9	1	8	0	0	–0.806	4	9th	
2020–21	Plate	6	2	4	0	0	–0.567	8	6th	
2021–22	Plate	6	1	5	0	0	–0.714	4	6th	
2022–23	Group A	7	0	7	0	0	–2.923	0	8th	

=== Senior Women's T20 League ===
Season	Division	League standings								Notes
Season	Division	P	W	L	T	NR	NRR	Pts	Pos	Notes
2018–19	Group B	6	1	5	0	0	−2.879	4	6th	
2019–20	Group B	6	1	5	0	0	−3.143	4	6th	
2021–22	Plate	6	2	4	0	0	–0.758	8	5th	
2022–23	Group E	6	0	5	0	1	–6.028	2	7th	

== See also ==
- Sikkim cricket team
