= Bengal women's cricket team =

Indian women's cricket team

Bengal Women

Personnel
- Captain: Rumeli Dhar, Saika Ishaque
- Owner: Cricket Association of Bengal

Team information
- Founded: Unknown First recorded match: 1973
- Home ground: Eden Gardens
- Capacity: 66,349

History
- WSODT wins: 1
- WSTT wins: 0
- Official website: Cricket Association of Bengal

The Bengal women's cricket team is a women's cricket team that represents the Indian state of West Bengal. The team competes in the Women's Senior One Day Trophy and the Women's Senior T20 Trophy. They won the One Day Trophy in 2018–19 in their first and only final so far, beating Andhra in the final by 10 runs.

== Notable players ==
- Jhulan Goswami
- Deepti Sharma
- Richa Ghosh

== All Players ==
- Mita Paul
- Dhara Gujjar
- Rumeli Dhar
- Saika Ishaque (c)
- Deepti Sharma
- Priyanka Bala (wk)
- Jhulan Goswami
- Richa Ghosh (wk)
- Parna Paul
- Jayram Mamata
- Gopal Prativa
- Runa Basu
- Lopamudra Bhattacharji
- Sreerupa Bose
- Sharmila Chakraborty
- Archana Das
- Sandhya Mazumdar
- Mithu Mukherjee
- Sukanya Parida
- Priyanka Roy
- Titas Sadhu
- Beas Sarkar
- Shyama Shaw
- Paramita Roy
- Dipali Shaw
- Trisha Bera
- Mandira Mahapatra
- Madhumonti Bhattacharya
- Ananya Mitra
- Sampa Mukherjee
- Gayatri Mal
- Pampa Sarkar
- Antara Jana
- Prativa Rana
- Jhumia Khatun
- Gouher Sultana
- Sushmita Ganguly
- Rukmini Roy
- Shrayoshi Aich
- Payal Vakharia
- Tanusree Sarkar
- Mamata Kisku
- Sasthi Mondal
- Rupal Tiwari
- Bidisha Dey
- Sujata Dey
- Chandrima Biswas
- Prativa Mandi
- Dyuti Paul

== Current squad ==
- Mita Paul
- Dhara Gujjar
- Saika Ishaque (c)
- Priyanka Bala (wk)
- Gopal Prativa
- Sushmita Ganguly
- Payal Vakharia
- Tanusree Sarkar
- Mamata Kisku
- Sasthi Mondal
- Rupal Tiwari
- Bidisha Dey
- Sujata Dey
- Chandrima Biswas
- Prativa Mandi
- Dyuti Paul

== Honours ==
- Women's Senior One Day Trophy
  - Winners (1): 2018–19
  - Runners-up (1): 2024–25
- Women's Senior T20 Trophy:
  - Runners-up (4): 2010–11, 2019–20, 2022–23, 2024–25

== See also ==
- Bengal cricket team
