= Bihar women's cricket team =

Indian women's cricket team

Bihar Women
Personnel
- Captain: Apurva Kumari
- Owner: Bihar Cricket Association

Team information
- Founded: Unknown First recorded match: 1975
- Home ground: Moin-ul-Haq Stadium, Patna; Urja Stadium, BSEB, Patna

History
- WSODT wins: 0
- WSTT wins: 0
- Official website: Bihar Cricket Association

The Bihar women's cricket team is a women's cricket team that represents the Indian state of Bihar. Since 2018–19, the team competes in both the Women's Senior One Day Trophy and the Women's Senior T20 Trophy.

== See also ==
- Bihar cricket team
