= Chhattisgarh women's cricket team =

Indian women's cricket team

Chhattisgarh Women
Personnel
- Captain: Pransu Priya

Team information
- Founded: Unknown First recorded match: 2012
- Home ground: Raipur District Cricket Association Ground, Raipur

History
- WSODT wins: 0
- WSTT wins: 0

The Chhattisgarh women's cricket team is a women's cricket team that represents the Indian state of Chhattisgarh. Since the 2016–17 season, the team has been competing in both the Women's Senior One Day Trophy and the Women's Senior T20 Trophy.

== See also ==
- Chhattisgarh cricket team
