= England Lions cricket team in India in 2018–19 =

Cricket tournament

England Lions cricket team in India in 2018-19
	India A	England Lions
- Dates: 18 January – 16 February 2019
Captains	Ajinkya Rahane(1st, 2nd and 3rd One day matches); Ankit Bawne (4th and 5th One day matches and 1st Test); K. L. Rahul (2nd Test)	Sam Billings

FC series
- Result: India A won the 2 (4-day)-match series 1–0
Most runs	Priyank Panchal (256)	Ben Duckett (175)
Most wickets	Navdeep Saini (9)	Zak Chappell (7)

LA series
- Result: India A won the 5-match series 4–1
Most runs	Ajinkya Rahane (150)	Sam Billings (156)
Most wickets	Axar Patel (8)	Lewis Gregory (8)

The England Lions cricket team toured India in January and February 2019 to play two first-class matches and five List-A matches against the India A cricket team. India A won the unofficial ODI series 4–1, and the unofficial Test series 1–0.

== Squads ==
Unofficial ODIs		Unofficial Tests	
India A	England Lions	India A	England Lions
Ajinkya Rahane (c) (1st, 2nd and 3rd One day matches); Ankit Bawne (c) (for 4th and 5th One day matches); Anmolpreet Singh; Ruturaj Gaikwad; Shreyas Iyer; Hanuma Vihari; Ishan Kishan (wk); Krunal Pandya; Axar Patel; Mayank Markande; Jayant Yadav; Siddarth Kaul; Shardul Thakur; Deepak Chahar; Navdeep Saini; Ricky Bhui; Siddhesh Lad; Himmat Singh; Rishabh Pant (wk); Deepak Hooda; Rahul Chahar; Avesh Khan; K. L. Rahul	Sam Billings (c); Dominic Bess; Danny Briggs; Matthew Carter; Zak Chappell; ~~Joe Clarke~~; Alex Davies (wk); Ben Duckett; Lewis Gregory; Sam Hain; ~~Tom Kohler-Cadmore~~; ~~Saqib Mahmood~~; Jamie Overton; Ollie Pope; Jamie Porter; Will Jacks; ~~Tom Moores~~; Tom Bailey; Steven Mullaney	Ankit Bawne (c) (for 1st Test); K. L. Rahul (c) (for 2nd Test); Abhimanyu Easwaran; Priyank Panchal; Ricky Bhui; Siddhesh Lad; K. S. Bharat (wk); Jalaj Saxena; Shahbaz Nadeem; Mayank Markande; Navdeep Saini; Shardul Thakur; Avesh Khan; Varun Aaron; Karun Nair	Sam Billings (c); Tom Bailey; Dominic Bess; Danny Briggs; Zak Chappell; ~~Joe Clarke~~; Alex Davies(wk); Ben Duckett; Lewis Gregory; Sam Hain; Max Holden; ~~Tom Kohler-Cadmore~~; Jamie Overton; Ollie Pope; Jamie Porter; Amar Virdi; Will Jacks; Tom Moores

Joe Clarke and Tom Kohler-Cadmore were dropped from the squad after their involvement in the Alex Hepburn rape trial, detailing their “sexual conquests” on WhatsApp, was revealed. They were replaced by Will Jacks and Tom Moores. Tom Bailey was added to unofficial ODI squad after Saqib Mahmood's visa was delayed due to his Pakistani heritage. Saqib was eventually withdrawn from the team. Steven Mullaney replaced Tom Moores in the unofficial ODI squad after Moores suffered a leg injury which ruled him out of the team. K. L. Rahul was added to the unofficial ODI squad after his suspension was provisionally lifted.

== Tour Match (List-A) ==
=== 1st One-Day Warm-up Match: Indian Board's President's XI vs England Lions ===
18 January 2019
09:00
Scorecard

England Lions; 255/6 (50 overs)	v	(India) Board President's XI; 256/6 (49.2 overs)
Alex Davies 100 (124); Mayank Markande 3/41 (10 overs)		Ruturaj Gaikwad 110 (125); Zak Chappell 3/53 (10 overs)

Board President's XI won by 4 wickets
St Xavier's College Ground, Thiruvananthapuram
Umpires: Sabyasachi Sarkar (Ind) and Akshay Marathe (Ind)

- England Lions won the toss and elected to bat.

=== 2nd One-Day Warm-up Match: Indian Board's President's XI vs England Lions ===
20 January 2019
09:00
Scorecard

England Lions; 104 (22.3 overs)	v	(India) Board President's XI; 105/5 (21.2 overs)
Sam Billings 52 (56); Pankaj Jaiswal 4/16 (6 overs)		Deepak Hooda 36* (45); Jamie Porter 5/36 (9 overs)

Board President's XI won by 5 wickets
St Xavier's College Ground, Thiruvananthapuram
Umpires: Sabyasachi Sarkar (Ind) and Akshay Marathe (Ind)

- Board President's XI won the toss and elected to field.

== India 'A' vs England Lions List-A Series ==
=== 1st Unofficial ODI ===
23 January 2019
09:00
Scorecard

England Lions; 285/7 (50 overs)	v	India A 288/7 (49.1 overs)
Sam Billings 108* (104); Mayank Markande 2/45 (9 overs)		Ajinkya Rahane 59 (87); Zak Chappell 3/84 (10 overs)

India A won by 3 wickets
Greenfield International Stadium, Thiruvananthapuram
Umpires: Sadashiv Iyer (Ind) and Krishnamachari Srinivasan (Ind)
Player of the match: Ishan Kishan (Ind-A)

- India A won the toss and elected to field.

=== 2nd Unofficial ODI ===
25 January 2019
09:00
Scorecard

India A 303/6 (50 overs)	v	England Lions; 165 (37.4 overs)
Hanuma Vihari 92 (83); Zak Chappell 2/47 (8 overs)		Alex Davies 48 (63); Mayank Markande 3/32 (8.4 overs)

India A won by 138 runs
Greenfield International Stadium, Thiruvananthapuram
Umpires: Sadashiv Iyer (Ind) and Krishnamachari Srinivasan (Ind)
Player of the match: Hanuma Vihari (Ind-A)

- England Lions won the toss and elected to field.

=== 3rd Unofficial ODI ===
27 January 2019
09:00
Scorecard

India A 172 (47.1 overs)	v	England Lions; 112 (30.5 overs)
Deepak Chahar 39 (65); Jamie Overton 3/34 (7.1 overs)		Ben Duckett 39 (50); Krunal Pandya 4/21 (5.5 overs)

India A won by 60 runs
Greenfield International Stadium, Thiruvananthapuram
Umpires: Sadashiv Iyer (Ind) and Krishnamachari Srinivasan (Ind)
Player of the match: Krunal Pandya (Ind-A)

- India A won the toss and elected to bat.

=== 4th Unofficial ODI ===
29 January 2019
09:00
Scorecard

England Lions; 221/8 (50 overs)	v	India A 222/4 (46.3 overs)
Ollie Pope 65 (103); Shardul Thakur 4/49 (10 overs)		Rishabh Pant 73* (76); Will Jacks 2/35 (10 overs)

India A won by 6 wickets
Greenfield International Stadium, Thiruvananthapuram
Umpires: Sadashiv Iyer (Ind) and Krishnamachari Srinivasan (Ind)
Player of the match: Rishabh Pant (Ind-A)

- England Lions won the toss and elected to bat.

=== 5th Unofficial ODI ===
31 January 2019
09:00
Scorecard

India A 121 (35 overs)	v	England Lions; 125/9 (30.3 overs)
Siddhesh Lad 36 (40); Jamie Overton 3/24 (7 overs)		Ben Duckett 71* (86); Deepak Chahar 3/25 (5 overs)

Eng Lions won by 1 wicket
Greenfield International Stadium, Thiruvananthapuram
Umpires: Sadashiv Iyer (Ind) and Krishnamachari Srinivasan (Ind)
Player of the match: Ben Duckett (Eng Lions)

- India A won the toss and elected to bat.

== Tour Match (First-Class) ==
=== Two-Day Warm-up Match: Indian Board's President's XI vs England Lions ===
3 – 4 February 2019
Scorecard

England Lions	v	(India) Board President's XI
145/6 (60 overs); Sam Hain 40* (118); Ankit Rajpoot 4/20 (9 overs)		134/5 (30 overs); Ishan Kishan 40* (49); Jamie Porter 2/22 (5 overs)
83/2 (30 overs); Will Jacks 21* (34); Aniket Choudhary 1/17 (5 overs)		246/6d (59.3 overs) (f/o); Ishan Kishan 55* (55); Dominic Bess 2/51 (11 overs)

Board President's XI won by 152 runs
St Xavier's College Ground, Thiruvananthapuram
Umpires: Chandrakant Mhase (Ind) and Ravi Subramaniam Iyer (Ind)

- Board President's XI won the toss and elected to field.
- Before the beginning of the match, it was decided that England Lions will bat 60 overs first and then India Board President's XI 30 overs on day 1, and vice versa on day 2.

== India 'A' vs England Lions First-Class Series ==
=== 1st Unofficial Test ===
7 – 10 February 2019
Scorecard

England Lions	v	India A
340 (104.3 overs); Ben Duckett 80 (118); Navdeep Saini 5/79 (23.3 overs)		540/6d (134.5 overs); Priyank Panchal 206 (313); Zak Chappell 3/105 (24 overs)
214/5 (82 overs); Ollie Pope 63 (122); Jalaj Saxena 2/56 (27 overs)

Match drawn
Krishnagiri Stadium, Wayanad
Umpires: Vineet Kulkarni (Ind) and Yeshwant Barde (Ind)

- India A won the toss and elected to field.

=== 2nd Unofficial Test ===
13 – 16 February 2019
Scorecard

India A	v	England Lions
392 (114.4 overs); Abhimanyu Easwaran 117 (222); Zak Chappell 4/60 (22 overs)		144 (48 .4 overs); Ollie Pope 25 (30); Navdeep Saini 3/30 (10 overs)
		180 (53.3 overs) (f/o); Ben Duckett 50 (61); Mayank Markande 5/31 (10.3 overs)

India A won by an innings and 68 runs
Srikantadatta Narasimha Raja Wadeyar Ground, Mysore
Umpires: Nitin Pandit (Ind) and K. N. Ananthapadmanabhan (Ind)

- India A won the toss and elected to bat.
