= 2018–19 Indian cricket season =

Cricket in India
- Season: 2018–19

Men's cricket
- Ranji Trophy: Vidarbha
- Duleep Trophy: India Blue
- Irani Cup: Vidarbha
- Vijay Hazare Trophy: Mumbai
- Deodhar Trophy: India C
- Syed Mushtaq Ali Trophy: Karnataka
- Indian Premier League: Mumbai Indians

Women's cricket
- One-Day League: Bengal women
- One-Day Challenger Trophy: India Red Women
- T20 League: Punjab women
- T20 Challenger Trophy: India Blue Women
- Women's T20 Challenge: IPL Supernovas

The 2018–19 Indian cricket season was the 126th cricket season since the commencement of first-class cricket in India. The international cricket season started early in June 2018 with Afghanistan playing its home matches against Bangladesh. Afghanistan went on to win the T20I series 3–0. The Indian national team started its season hosting Afghanistan for the latter's Test cricket debut. India won the match in two days by an innings and 262 runs. West Indies toured India and lost the Test series 0–2, ODI series 1–3 and the T20I series 0–3. Australia toured India and won the T20I series 2–0 and ODI series 3–2. India also played host to Afghanistan's home games against Ireland. Afghanistan won the T20I series 3–0 and Test series 1–0. The ODI series was drawn 2–2. England women's toured India and lost the WODI series 1–2 but won the WT20I series 3–0.

India was scheduled to host Asia Cup but it was moved to the United Arab Emirates, following ongoing political tensions between India and Pakistan. In July, the scheduled Asia Cup Qualifiers were also shifted from India to Malaysia. Zimbabwe was also scheduled to tour India but due to the conflicting dates with 2019 Indian Premier League, the Zimbabwe's tour was put in doubt and the series was postponed.

The A-team season consisted of tours from Australia A, South Africa A, England Lions and Australia A Women. South Africa A lost the first class series 0–1. They were joined by India B and Australia A for a List A Quadrangular Series. India B defeated Australia A in the final to win the series. Australia A drew the first class series 1–1. England Lions lost the first class series 0–1 and List A series 1–4. Australia A women won the women's list a series 0–3 but lost the women's T20 series 3–0.

The domestic season was the biggest ever after addition of nine new teams as per the Lodha Panel recommendations and overs 2000 matches were played. During the season, BCCI faced strain on its resources(umpires and referees) due to high number of matches. The domestic season began with Duleep trophy and finished in May with 12th season of Indian Premiere League. India Blue won the Duleep trophy. Bengal won the Vijay Hazare trophy. Vidharbha won the Ranji Trophy. Vidharbha also won the Irani Trophy. Karnataka won the Syed Mushtaq Ali Trophy. Mumbai Indians won the 2019 Indian Premier League.

The women's domestic season began in August with the new Women's T20 Challenger Trophy and ended in May with Women's T20 Challenge. India Blue Women won the T20 Challenger Trophy. Bengal women won the one-day league. India Red Women won the One-Day Challenger Trophy. Punjab won the Senior Women's T20 League. IPL Supernovas won the 2019 Women's T20 Challenge.

== International ==
Men's International tours
| Dates | Tournament | Home team | Away team | Results [Matches] | | |
| Dates | Tournament | Home team | Away team | Test | ODI | T20I |
|---|---|---|---|---|---|---|
| 1 June 2018– 7 June 2018 | Bangladesh against Afghanistan in India | (India) Afghanistan | Bangladesh | — | — | 3–0 [3] |
| 14 June 2018– 18 June 2018 | Afghanistan tour of India | India | Afghanistan | 1–0 [1] | — | — |
| 29 September 2018– 11 November 2018 | West Indies tour of India | India | West Indies | 2–0 [2] | 3–1 [5] | 3–0 [3] |
| 21 February 2019– 19 March 2019 | Ireland against Afghanistan in India | (India) Afghanistan | Ireland | 1–0 [1] | 2–2 [5] | 3–0 [3] |
| 24 February 2019– 13 March 2019 | Australia tour of India | India | Australia | — | 2–3 [5] | 0–2 [2] |
Women's International tours
| Dates | Tournament | Home team | Away team | Results [Matches] | | |
| Dates | Tournament | Home team | Away team | WTest | WODI | WT20I |
| 18 February 2019– 8 March 2019 | English women tour of India | India | England | — | 2–1 [3] | 0–3 [3] |

=== India-A, India-B and India U-19 Teams ===
International tours
| Dates | Tournament | Home team | Away team | Results [Matches] | |
| Dates | Tournament | Home team | Away team | FC | LA |
|---|---|---|---|---|---|
| 30 July 2018– 13 August 2018 | India 'A' vs South Africa 'A'; First-Class Series | India A | South Africa A | 1–0 [2] | — |
| 2 September 2018– 11 September 2018 | India 'A' vs Australia 'A'; First-Class series | India A | Australia A | 1–1 [2] | — |
| 18 January 2019– 16 February 2019 | India 'A' vs England Lions; First-Class and List-A series | India A | England Lions | 1–0 [2] | 4–1 [5] |
Multiteam tournaments
| Dates | Tournament | Teams | | | Winners |
| 17 August 2018– 29 August 2018 | Quadrangular Series (List-A) | India A, India B, Australia A and South Africa A | | | India B |
Women's international tours
| Dates | Tournament | Home team | Away team | Results [Matches] | |
| Dates | Tournament | Home team | Away team | Women's LA | Women's T20 |
| 15 October 2018– 26 October 2018 | India 'A' Women vs Australia 'A' Women; List-A and T20 series | India A Women | Australia A Women | 0–3 [3] | 3–0 [3] |

== Domestic ==
The domestic season was the largest ever with addition of nine new teams as per the Lodha Panel recommendations and over 2000 matches were held. The nine new teams that will make their debut in the season are Arunachal Pradesh, Bihar, Manipur cricket team, Meghalaya, Mizoram, Nagaland, Puducherry, Sikkim and Uttarakhand. The new teams played in the plate group with old 28 teams playing in Elite Groups A, B and C. New teams also struggled for availability of grounds and players for the teams. The qualification structure, of top-5 teams qualifying from Group-A and B combined, was a source of confusion and controversy. The shortage of umpires and match officials also remained a serious issue for the BCCI. Cricket Association of Bengal complaint about the poor quality of umpires during Ranji Trophy. BCCI also had to face issue of players misusing their domicile to play for the new teams.

=== Men's ===
2018–19 India's Men's domestic cricket season
Ranji Trophy
- Champions: Vidarbha
- Runners-up: Saurashtra
- Most runs: Milind Kumar (1331) (Sik)
- Most wickets: Ashutosh Aman (68) (Bih)

Duleep Trophy
- Champions: India Blue
- Runners-up: India Red
- Most runs: Dhruv Shorey (293) (Ind Blu)
- Most wickets: Saurabh Kumar (19) (Ind Blu)

Irani Cup
- Champions: Vidarbha
- Runners-up: Rest of India
- Most runs: Hanuma Vihari (294) (RoI)
- Most wickets: Rahul Chahar (6) (RoI)

Vijay Hazare Trophy
- Champions: Mumbai
- Runners-up: Delhi
- Most runs: Abhinav Mukund (560) (TN)
- Most wickets: Shahbaz Nadeem (24) (Jha)

Deodhar Trophy
- Champions: India C
- Runners-up: India B
- Most runs: Shreyas Iyer (199) (Ind-B)
- Most wickets: Vijay Shankar (7) (Ind-C)

Syed Mushtaq Ali Trophy
- Champions: Karnataka
- Runners-up: Maharashtra
- Most runs: Rohan Kadam (536) (Kar)
- Most wickets: Satyajeet Bachhav (20) (Mah)

Indian Premier League
- Champions: Mumbai Indians
- Runners-up: Chennai Super Kings
- Most runs: (Australia) David Warner (692) (SRH)
- Most wickets: (South Africa) Imran Tahir (26) (CSK)

The men's season began in August with Duleep Trophy. India Blue defeated India Red by an innings and 187 runs in the final to win the tournament. The Vijay Hazare Trophy was played in September and October. Mumbai defeated Delhi in the final by 4 wickets to win the Vijay Hazare trophy. The Ranji Trophy started in November and finished with knockouts being played in January. For the new teams in Plate group, the professional players played the key role of guiding and holding their teams during the Ranji trophy. Vidarbha successfully defended the Ranji Trophy crown by defeating Saurashtra by 78 runs in the final played at Nagpur. By winning the Ranji Trophy, Vidharbha played Rest of India in a Best vs Rest format one-off match for Irani Cup. Vidharbha defeated Rest of India on first-innings basis to win the Irani Cup. The Syed Mushtaq Ali Trophy was held in February and March. Karnataka won the Syed Mushtaq Ali Trophy for the first time after beating Maharashtra by 8 wickets in the final. The men's season ended with the 12th season of IPL, which ran from 23 March to 12 May. Mumbai Indians defeated Chennai Super Kings by 1 run in the final to win the 2019 Indian Premier League.

| Dates | Tournament | Matches Format | Teams Format (No. of Teams) | Tournament format (No. of Matches) | Winners |
|---|---|---|---|---|---|
| 17 August 2018– 8 September 2018 | Duleep Trophy | First-class | Intra-national (3 Teams) | Round-robin and Finals (4 Matches) | India Blue |
| 19 September 2018– 20 October 2018 | Vijay Hazare Trophy | List A | Inter-state (37 Teams) | Round-robin and Playoff format (160 Matches) | Mumbai |
| 23 October 2018– 27 October 2018 | Deodhar Trophy | List A | Intra-national (3 Teams) | Round-robin and Finals (4 Matches) | India C |
| 1 November 2018– 6 February 2019 | Ranji Trophy | First-class | Inter-state (37 Teams) | Round-robin and Playoff format (160 Matches) | Vidarbha |
| 11 February 2019– 15 February 2019 | Irani Cup | First-class | State and Intra-national (2 Teams) | Single match (1 Match) | Vidarbha |
| 21 February 2019– 13 March 2019 | Syed Mushtaq Ali Trophy | Twenty20 | Inter-state (37 Teams) | Round-robin and Playoff format (140 Matches) | Karnataka |
| 23 March 2019– 19 May 2019 | Indian Premier League | Twenty20 | Inter-franchise (8 Teams) | Double Round-robin and Playoff format (60 Matches) | Mumbai; Indians |

=== Women's ===
2018–19 India's Women's domestic cricket season
One-Day League
- Champions: Bengal women
- Runners-up: Andhra women
- Most runs: Deepti Sharma (487) (Ben)
- Most wickets: Tarannum Pathan (24) (Bar)

One-Day Challenger Trophy
- Champions: India Red Women
- Runners-up: India Blue Women
- Most runs: Harleen Deol (119) (Ind Red)
- Most wickets: Shikha Pandey (8) (Ind Red)

T20 League
- Champions: Punjab women
- Runners-up: Karnataka women
- Most runs: Priya Punia (382) (Del)
- Most wickets: Priyanka Priyadarshini (17) (Odh)

T20 Challenger Trophy
- Champions: India Blue Women
- Runners-up: India Red Women
- Most runs: Punam Raut (135) (Ind Red)
- Most wickets: Anuja Patil (8) (Ind Blu)

Women's T20 Challenge
- Champions: IPL Supernovas
- Runners-up: IPL Velocity
- Most runs: (India) Jemimah Rodrigues (123) (Sup)
- Most wickets: (New Zealand) Amelia Kerr (6) (Vel)

The Inter-zonal multi-day game was eliminated from the women's season. The Challenger Trophy was also held in T20 format along with previously played one-day format. The new T20 Challenger Trophy started the domestic season in August.India Blue Women defeated India Red women by 4 runs to win the inaugural trophy. The One-Day League was played in December. Due to scheduling conflicts, the knockout for the one-day tournament were delayed and moved from 24 to 29 December to 26–31 December. Bengal defeated Andhra by 10 runs in the final to win their first One Day League. One Day League was followed by One-Day Challenger Trophy in January. India Red defeated India Blue by 15 runs to win the Challenger Trophy for the 3rd time. T20 League was held in February. Punjab beat Karnataka by 4 runs to win the Senior Women T20 league. A parallel women's tournament with IPL, a followup to 2018 Women's T20 Challenge was held in May 2019 with three teams. IPL Supernovas defeated IPL Velocity by 4 wickets in the final to win the 2019 Women's T20 Challenge.

| Dates | Tournament | Matches Format | Teams Format (No. of Teams) | Tournament format (No. of Matches) | Winners |
|---|---|---|---|---|---|
| 13 August 2018– 18 August 2018 | T20 Challenger; Trophy | Women's Twenty20 | Intra-national (3 Teams) | Double Round-robin and Finals (7 Matches) | India Blue; Women |
| 1 December 2018– 31 December 2018 | One-Day League | Women's List A | Inter-state (36 Teams) | Round-robin and Playoff format (151 Matches) | Bengal Women |
| 3 January 2019– 6 January 2019 | Challenger Trophy | Women's List A | Intra-national (3 Teams) | Round-robin and Finals (4 Matches) | India Red; Women |
| 20 February 2019– 13 March 2019 | T20 League | Women's Twenty20 | Inter-state (36 Teams) | Round-robin and Playoff format (133 Matches) | Punjab women |
| 6 May 2019– 11 May 2019 | Women's T20 Challenge | Women's Twenty20 | Intra-national (3 Teams) | Round-robin and Finals (4 Matches) | IPL; Supernovas |

== Junior level ==
Contents
| 1 International Under-19 Men's | | | 2 Domestic Men's | | | | | | | 3 Domestic Women's | | | | | | |
|---|---|---|---|---|---|---|---|---|---|---|---|---|---|---|---|---|
| 1.1; Quadr- angular Series; 2018 | 1.2; Youth; Test; Series vs South; Africa | 1.3; Quadr- angular Series; 2019 | 2.1; Col C K Nayudu; Trophy | 2.2; U23; One-Day; League and Knockout | 2.3; Vizzy; Trophy | 2.4; Cooch; Behar; Trophy | 2.5; Vinoo; Mankad; Trophy | 2.6; U19; One-Day; Challenger; Trophy | 2.7; Vijay; Merchant; Trophy | 3.1; U23; One-Day; League | 3.2; U23; One-Day; Challenger; Trophy | 3.3; U23 T20; League | 3.4; U23 T20; Challenger; Trophy | 3.5; U19; One-Day; League | 3.6; U19 T20; League | 3.7; U19 T20; Challenger; Trophy |

=== International ===
Men's U-19 International tours
| Dates | Tournament | Home team | Away team | Results [Matches] | |
| Dates | Tournament | Home team | Away team | Youth Test | Youth ODI |
|---|---|---|---|---|---|
| 20 February 2019– 1 March 2019 | India Under-19 vs South Africa Under-19; Youth Test Series | India U-19 | South Africa U-19 | 2–0 [2] | — |
Men's U-19 International tournaments
| Dates | Tournament | Teams | | | Winners |
| 12 September 2018– 18 September 2018 | Quadrangular Series 2018 (One-Day) | India U-19 A, India U-19 B, Afghanistan U-19 and Nepal U-19 | | | India U-19 B |
| 5 March 2019– 11 March 2019 | Quadrangular Series 2019 (One-Day) | India U-19 A, India U-19 B, Afghanistan U-19 and South Africa U-19 | | | India U-19 B |

==== Under-19 Men's International Quadrangular Series 2018 ====
2018 U-19 team Quadrangular Series, India
- Dates: 12 – 18 September 2018
- Cricket format: U-19 One-day
- Champions: India U-19 B
- Runners-up: India U-19 A
- Participants: 4
- Matches: 8
- Most runs: Reyaz Hassan (324) (Afg U-19)
- Most wickets: Abdul Rahman Rahmani (8) (Afg U-19)
- Official website: bcci.tv

BCCI announced the Under-19 quadrangular tournament between Afghanistan, Nepal, India-A and NCA. NCA was later replaced by India-B while tournament was also shifted from Kolkata to Lucknow. The tournament was looked upon as a preparation for the Youth Asia Cup. The tournament was played from 12 to 18 September 2018. India U-19 B defeated India U-19 A by 10 runs in the final to win the tournament.

===== League =====
| Team | P | W | L | T | NR | Pts | NRR |
|---|---|---|---|---|---|---|---|
| India U-19 A (RU) | 3 | 3 | 0 | 0 | 0 | 9 | +3.024 |
| India U-19 B (C) | 3 | 2 | 1 | 0 | 0 | 5 | −0.732 |
| Nepal U-19 | 3 | 1 | 2 | 0 | 0 | 2 | −0.775 |
| Afghanistan U-19 (3rd) | 3 | 0 | 3 | 0 | 0 | 0 | −1.118 |

Top two teams advanced to the final

===== Third place play-off =====
18 September 2018
Scorecard

| Afghanistan U-19; 244/8 (50 overs) | v | Nepal U-19; 173 (45 overs) |

Afghanistan U-19 Won by 71 Runs
Ekana International Cricket Stadium-B, Lucknow

===== Final =====
18 September 2018
Scorecard

| India U-19 B 141 (42.2 overs) | v | India U-19 A 131 (39.3 overs) |

India U-19 B Won by 10 Runs
Ekana International Cricket Stadium, Lucknow

==== Under-19 Men's Youth Test Series vs South Africa ====
South Africa Under-19 cricket team in India in 2019
| | India Under-19 | South Africa Under-19 |
- Dates: 20 February – 1 March 2019

Test series
- Result: India Under-19 won the 2-match series 2–0
| Most runs | Yashasvi Jaiswal (197) | Bryce Parsons (144) |
| Most wickets | Hrithik Shokeen (10) | Lifa Ntanzi (7) |

In February and March 2019, South Africa Under-19 cricket team toured India to play 2-match Youth Test series against India Under-19 cricket team. Both the matches were played at the Greenfield International Stadium, Thiruvananthapuram. India Under-19 won the first test by 9 wickets. In 2nd test, India Under-19 defeated South Africa by an innings and 158 runs. Hence, India clean swept the Under-19 Youth Test series 2–0.

20–23 February 2019
Scorecard

| South Africa U-19; 197 (67.5 overs) & 167 (66 overs) | v | India U-19; 330 (92.3 overs) & 37/1 (7.5 overs) |

India U19 won by 9 wickets
Greenfield International Stadium, Thiruvananthapuram

26 February-1 March 2019
Scorecard

| South Africa U-19; 152 (54.4 overs) & 85 (45.4 overs) | v | India U-19; 395 (101.2 overs) |

India U19 won by an innings and 158 runs
Greenfield International Stadium, Thiruvananthapuram

==== Under-19 Men's International Quadrangular Series 2019 ====
2019 U-19 team Quadrangular Series, India
- Dates: 5 – 11 March 2019
- Cricket format: U-19 One-day
- Champions: India U-19 B
- Runners-up: India U-19 A
- Participants: 4
- Matches: 8
- Most runs: Andile Mokgakane (140) (RSA U-19)
- Most wickets: Marco Jansen (8) (RSA U-19)
- Official website: bcci.tv

BCCI announced the Under-19 quadrangular tournament between Afghanistan, Oman, India-A and India-B. Due to visa issues, Oman was later replaced by Afghanistan. The tournament was played from 5 to 11 March 2019 at Thiruvananthapuram. India U-19 B defeated India U-19 A by 72 runs in the final to win the tournament.

===== League =====
| Team | P | W | L | T | NR | Pts | NRR |
|---|---|---|---|---|---|---|---|
| India U-19 B (C) | 3 | 3 | 0 | 0 | 0 | 13 | +0.919 |
| India U-19 A (RU) | 3 | 2 | 1 | 0 | 0 | 10 | +1.503 |
| South Africa U-19 (3rd) | 3 | 1 | 2 | 0 | 0 | 4 | −0.993 |
| Afghanistan U-19 | 3 | 0 | 3 | 0 | 0 | 0 | −1.504 |

Top two teams advanced to the final

===== Third place play-off =====
11 March 2019
Scorecard

| South Africa U-19; 231/8 (50 overs) | v | Afghanistan U-19; 176 (45 overs) |

South Africa U-19 Won by 55 Runs
St Xavier's College Ground, Thiruvananthapuram

===== Final =====
11 March 2019
Scorecard

| India U-19 B 232/9 (50 overs) | v | India U-19 A 160 (38.3 overs) |

India U-19 B Won by 72 Runs
Greenfield International Stadium, Thiruvananthapuram

=== Domestic Men's ===
2018–19 India's Junior Men's domestic cricket season
Col C K Nayudu Trophy (U-23)
- Champions: Punjab U-23 Men
- Runners-up: Bengal U-23 Men
- Most runs: M A Hingrajia (872) (Guj U-23)
- Most wickets: Sidak Singh (63) (Pud U-19)

Men's U23 One-Day League and Knockout (U-23)
- Champions: Vidarbha U-23 Men
- Runners-up: Delhi U-23 Men
- Most runs: Suved Parkar (540) (Mum U-23)
- Most wickets: Dhrushant H Soni (23) (Rail U-23)

Vizzy Trophy (Inter-University)
- Champions: South Zone University Men
- Runners-up: North Zone University Men
- Most runs: Abhirath Reddy (202) (Sou Zon)
- Most wickets: K Shashank (13) (Sou Zon)

Cooch Behar Trophy (U-19)
- Champions: Uttar Pradesh U-19 Men
- Runners-up: Vidarbha U-19 Men
- Most runs: Vathsal (1235) (Ker U-19)
- Most wickets: A Anand (28) (Bih U-19)

Vinoo Mankad Trophy (U-19)
- Champions: Vidarbha U-19 Men
- Runners-up: Tamil Nadu U-19 Men
- Most runs: Piyush Kumar Singh (534) (Bih U-19)
- Most wickets: Rohit Dattatraya (28) (Vid U-19)

Men's U19 One-Day Challenger Trophy (U-19)
- Champions: India Green U-19 Men
- Runners-up: India Blue U-19 Men
- Most runs: Pradosh Ranjan Paul (223) (Ind-U-19 Blue)
- Most wickets: Jaymeet Patel (7) (Ind-U-19 Yellow)

Vijay Merchant Trophy (U-16)
- Champions: Haryana U-16 Men
- Runners-up: Jharkhand U-16 Men
- Most runs: Aryan Hooda (903) (Jha U-16)
- Most wickets: Abhishek (46) (Jha U-16)

Vijay Merchant Trophy was originally scheduled to start from 3 October but was postponed to 21 October after the request from state associations. Due to scheduling conflicts, the Cooch Behar trophy was also delayed. Vidarbha U-19 Men defeated Tamil Nadu U-19 Men by 83 runs in the final to win Vinoo Mankad Trophy. India Green Under-19 defeated India Blue Under-19 by 6 wickets in the final to win the Men's U19 One-Day Challenger Trophy. Haryana Under-16 defeated Jharkhand Under-16 on first-innings basis in the final to win the Vijay Merchant Trophy for the first time. Punjab Under-23 defeated Bengal Under-23 by 1 wicket in the final to win the Col C K Nayudu Trophy. Uttar Pradesh U-19 Men defeated Vidarbha U-19 Men on first-innings basis in the final to win the Cooch Behar Trophy. Vidarbha U-23 Men defeated Delhi U-23 Men by 4 wickets in the final to win the trophy. In the final tournament of the season, South Zone University Men defeated North Zone University Men by 60 runs to win the Vizzy Trophy.

| Dates | Tournament | Age-Group (Matches Format) | Teams Format (No. of Teams) | Tournament format (No. of Matches) | Winners |
|---|---|---|---|---|---|
| 5 October 2018– 4 November 2018 | Vinoo Mankad; Trophy | Men's U-19 (One-Day) | Inter-state (35 Teams) | Round-robin and Playoff format (143 Matches) | Vidarbha; U-19 Men |
| 21 October 2018– 15 January 2019 | Vijay Merchant; Trophy | Men's U-16 (Multi-Day) | Inter-state (35 Teams) | Round-robin and Playoff format (97 Matches) | Haryana; U-16 Men |
| 2 November 2018– 7 February 2019 | Col C K Nayudu; Trophy | Men's U-23 (Multi-Day) | Inter-state (36 Teams) | Round-robin and Playoff format (151 Matches) | Punjab; U-23 Men |
| 10 November 2018– 16 November 2018 | Men's U19 One-Day; Challenger Trophy | Men's U-19 (One-Day) | Intra-national (4 Teams) | Round-robin and Finals (7 Matches) | India Green; U-19 Men |
| 19 November 2018– 14 February 2019 | Cooch Behar; Trophy | Men's U-19 (Multi-Day) | Inter-state (35 Teams) | Round-robin and Playoff format (143 Matches) | Uttar Pradesh; U-19 Men |
| 13 February 2019– 15 March 2019 | Men's U23 One-Day; League and Knockout | Men's U-23 (One-Day) | Inter-state (36 Teams) | Round-robin and Playoff format (151 Matches) | Vidarbha; U-23 Men |
| 17 March 2019– 23 March 2019 | Vizzy Trophy | Men's Inter-University (One-Day) | Inter-zonal (4 Teams) | Round-robin and Finals (7 Matches) | South Zone; University Men |

==== Under-23 ====
The Under-23 age group consisted of Col C K Nayudu Trophy (Multi-day competition) and One-Day League and Knockout.

===== Col C K Nayudu Trophy =====
Col C K Nayudu Trophy
- Dates: 2 November 2018 – 7 February 2019
- Cricket format: Men's U-23 Multi-Day
- Champions: Punjab U-23 Men
- Runners-up: Bengal U-23 Men
- Participants: 36
- Matches: 151
- Most runs: M A Hingrajia (872) (Guj U-23)
- Most wickets: Sidak Singh (63) (Pud U-19)
- Official website: bcci.tv

Col C K Nayudu Trophy was played from 2 November 2018 to 7 February 2019. BCCI's move to allot women umpires for the tournament was appreciated. Shiva Singh's 360-degree action in a match was Bengal was a source of controversy leading to a clarification from MCC. Puducherry's Rex Singh took all 10 wickets in an innings in a league stage match against Manipur. Punjab Under-23 defeated Bengal Under-23 by 1 wicket in the final to win the tournament.

====== League ======
Points table

Elite Group-A

| Team | P | W | L | D | T | NR | Pts | Q |
|---|---|---|---|---|---|---|---|---|
| Gujarat | 8 | 4 | 1 | 3 | 0 | 0 | 32 | 1.301 |
| Baroda | 8 | 3 | 1 | 4 | 0 | 0 | 30 | 1.296 |
| Delhi | 8 | 3 | 2 | 3 | 0 | 0 | 27 | 1.296 |
| Hyderabad | 8 | 4 | 3 | 1 | 0 | 0 | 26 | 0.908 |
| Karnataka | 8 | 3 | 2 | 3 | 0 | 0 | 24 | 1.161 |
| Tamil Nadu | 8 | 3 | 2 | 3 | 0 | 0 | 24 | 1.008 |
| Madhya Pradesh | 8 | 3 | 4 | 1 | 0 | 0 | 22 | 0.993 |
| Assam | 8 | 2 | 6 | 0 | 0 | 0 | 12 | 0.682 |
| Jharkhand | 8 | 1 | 5 | 2 | 0 | 0 | 8 | 0.633 |

Elite Group-B

| Team | P | W | L | D | T | NR | Pts | Q |
|---|---|---|---|---|---|---|---|---|
| Punjab | 8 | 6 | 2 | 0 | 0 | 0 | 39 | 1.453 |
| Bengal | 8 | 5 | 1 | 2 | 0 | 0 | 39 | 1.592 |
| Mumbai | 8 | 5 | 1 | 2 | 0 | 0 | 35 | 1.391 |
| Uttar Pradesh | 8 | 4 | 2 | 2 | 0 | 0 | 32 | 1.291 |
| Maharashtra | 8 | 2 | 3 | 3 | 0 | 0 | 19 | 0.893 |
| Rajasthan | 8 | 2 | 3 | 3 | 0 | 0 | 15 | 0.916 |
| Saurashtra | 8 | 2 | 4 | 2 | 0 | 0 | 14 | 0.682 |
| Andhra | 8 | 1 | 5 | 2 | 0 | 0 | 11 | 0.859 |
| Tripura | 8 | 0 | 6 | 2 | 0 | 0 | 6 | 0.544 |

Elite Group-C

| Team | P | W | L | D | T | NR | Pts | Q |
|---|---|---|---|---|---|---|---|---|
| Vidarbha | 8 | 6 | 1 | 1 | 0 | 0 | 42 | 1.424 |
| Himachal | 8 | 5 | 1 | 2 | 0 | 0 | 35 | 1.257 |
| Railways | 8 | 4 | 2 | 2 | 0 | 0 | 29 | 1.515 |
| Haryana | 8 | 4 | 3 | 1 | 0 | 0 | 28 | 1.165 |
| Kerala | 8 | 3 | 5 | 0 | 0 | 0 | 19 | 1.002 |
| Jammu & Kashmir | 8 | 2 | 3 | 3 | 0 | 0 | 18 | 0.915 |
| Chhattisgarh | 8 | 2 | 3 | 3 | 0 | 0 | 18 | 0.861 |
| Goa | 8 | 1 | 5 | 2 | 0 | 0 | 8 | 0.581 |
| Odisha | 8 | 0 | 4 | 4 | 0 | 0 | 8 | 0.595 |

Plate

| Team | P | W | L | D | T | NR | Pts | Q |
|---|---|---|---|---|---|---|---|---|
| Uttarakhand | 8 | 8 | 0 | 0 | 0 | 0 | 53 | 3.154 |
| Puducherry | 8 | 6 | 1 | 1 | 0 | 0 | 42 | 1.736 |
| Nagaland | 8 | 6 | 2 | 0 | 0 | 0 | 38 | 1.383 |
| Bihar | 8 | 5 | 2 | 1 | 0 | 0 | 35 | 1.602 |
| Manipur | 8 | 4 | 4 | 0 | 0 | 0 | 26 | 1.160 |
| Arunachal Pradesh | 8 | 3 | 5 | 0 | 0 | 0 | 20 | 1.064 |
| Mizoram | 8 | 2 | 6 | 0 | 0 | 0 | 12 | 0.411 |
| Meghalaya | 8 | 1 | 7 | 0 | 0 | 0 | 7 | 0.767 |
| Sikkim | 8 | 0 | 8 | 0 | 0 | 0 | 0 | 0.140 |

- Top five teams across Groups A and B advanced to the knockout stage. Top two teams from Group C advanced to the knockout stage and are promoted to Groups A and B for the next season. Top team from Group C advanced to the knockout stage and are promoted to Group C for the next season.
- Bottom two teams across Groups A and B relegated to the Group C for the next season. Bottom ranked team in Group-C is relegated to the Plate Group for the next season.

====== Quarter-finals ======
17–20 January 2019
Scorecard

| Uttarakhand U-23 Men; 160 (43 overs) & 147 (31 overs) | v | Punjab U-23 Men; 713 (183.1 overs) |

Punjab U-23 Men won by an innings and 406 Runs
Dhruve Pandove Stadium, Patiala

17–20 January 2019
Scorecard

| Bengal U-23 Men; 620/7d (168.3 overs) & 164/3 (42 overs) | v | Himachal U-23 Men; 406 (126.1 overs) |

Match Drawn (Bengal U-23 Men qualified on first innings lead)
Eden Gardens, Kolkata

17–20 January 2019
Scorecard

| Vidarbha U-23 Men; 331 (105 overs) & 221 (65.4 overs) | v | Mumbai U-23 Men; 154 (54.3 overs) & 104 (35.1 overs) |

Vidarbha U-23 Men won by 294 Runs
Vidarbha Cricket Association Ground, Nagpur

17–20 January 2019
Scorecard

| Gujarat U-23 Men; 428 (128.2 overs) & 322/9 (100 overs) | v | Uttar Pradesh U-23 Men; 377 (102 overs) |

Match Drawn (Gujarat U-23 Men qualified on first innings lead)
Sardar Vallabhbhai Patel Stadium, Valsad

====== Semi-finals ======
26–29 January 2019
Scorecard

| Gujarat U-23 Men; 165 (55.3 overs) & 240 (71.3 overs) | v | Punjab U-23 Men; 447 (105 overs) |

Punjab U-23 Men won an innings and 42 Runs
Sardar Vallabhbhai Patel Stadium, Valsad

26–29 January 2019
Scorecard

| Vidarbha U-23 Men; 351 (112.4 overs) & 111 (42.1 overs) | v | Bengal U-23 Men; 348 (117.5 overs) & 115/2 (23.1 overs) |

Bengal U-23 Men won by 8 Wickets
Eden Gardens, Kolkata

====== Final ======
4–7 February 2019
Scorecard

| Bengal U-23 Men; 191 (54.2 overs) & 76 (26.2 overs) | v | Punjab U-23 Men; 133 (48.1 overs) & 137/9 (30.1 overs) |

Punjab U-23 Men won by 1 wicket
Dhruve Pandove Stadium, Patiala

===== Men's U23 One-Day League and Knockout =====
Men's U23 One-Day League and Knockout
- Dates: 13 February – 15 March 2019
- Cricket format: Men's U-23 One-day
- Champions: Vidarbha U-23 Men
- Runners-up: Delhi U-23 Men
- Participants: 36
- Matches: 151
- Most runs: Suved Parkar (540) (Mum U-23)
- Most wickets: Dhrushant H Soni (23) (Rail U-23)
- Official website: bcci.tv

Men's U23 One-Day League and Knockout was played from 13 February to 15 March 2019. The tournament's qualification structure was similar to Ranji Trophy. Vidarbha U-23 Men defeated Delhi U-23 Men by 4 wickets in the final to win the trophy.

====== League ======
Points table

Elite Group-A and B

| Team | P | W | L | T | NR | Pts | NRR |
|---|---|---|---|---|---|---|---|
| Punjab | 8 | 7 | 1 | 0 | 0 | 28 | +1.141 |
| Mumbai | 8 | 6 | 1 | 1 | 0 | 26 | +1.307 |
| Delhi | 8 | 6 | 2 | 0 | 0 | 24 | +0.337 |
| Maharashtra | 8 | 6 | 2 | 0 | 0 | 24 | +0.801 |
| Vidarbha | 8 | 5 | 2 | 1 | 0 | 22 | +0.696 |
| Railways | 8 | 5 | 3 | 0 | 0 | 20 | +0.328 |
| Andhra | 8 | 5 | 3 | 0 | 0 | 20 | +0.368 |
| Karnataka | 8 | 5 | 3 | 0 | 0 | 20 | +0.507 |
| Madhya Pradesh | 8 | 5 | 3 | 0 | 0 | 20 | −0.300 |
| Bengal | 8 | 4 | 4 | 0 | 0 | 16 | +0.819 |
| Uttar Pradesh | 8 | 4 | 4 | 0 | 0 | 16 | +0.381 |
| Gujarat | 8 | 3 | 5 | 0 | 0 | 12 | −0.571 |
| J & K | 8 | 3 | 5 | 0 | 0 | 12 | −0.671 |
| Rajasthan | 8 | 3 | 5 | 0 | 0 | 12 | −0.633 |
| Kerala | 8 | 2 | 6 | 0 | 0 | 8 | −0.603 |
| Tamil Nadu | 8 | 1 | 7 | 0 | 0 | 4 | −0.747 |
| Chhattisgarh | 8 | 1 | 7 | 0 | 0 | 4 | −1.214 |
| Odisha | 8 | 0 | 8 | 0 | 0 | 0 | −2.144 |

Elite Group-C

| Team | P | W | L | T | NR | Pts | NRR |
|---|---|---|---|---|---|---|---|
| Baroda | 8 | 6 | 2 | 0 | 0 | 24 | +1.129 |
| Jharkhand | 8 | 5 | 3 | 0 | 0 | 20 | +0.867 |
| Himachal | 8 | 5 | 3 | 0 | 0 | 20 | +0.604 |
| Saurashtra | 8 | 4 | 4 | 0 | 0 | 16 | −0.295 |
| Haryana | 8 | 4 | 4 | 0 | 0 | 16 | −0.323 |
| Hyderabad | 8 | 4 | 4 | 0 | 0 | 16 | +0.366 |
| Goa | 8 | 3 | 5 | 0 | 0 | 12 | +0.064 |
| Tripura | 8 | 3 | 5 | 0 | 0 | 12 | −0.824 |
| Assam | 8 | 2 | 6 | 0 | 0 | 8 | −1.468 |

Plate

| Team | P | W | L | T | NR | Pts | NRR |
|---|---|---|---|---|---|---|---|
| Uttarakhand | 8 | 8 | 0 | 0 | 0 | 32 | +2.509 |
| Bihar | 8 | 7 | 1 | 0 | 0 | 28 | +1.061 |
| Nagaland | 8 | 5 | 3 | 0 | 0 | 20 | +1.398 |
| Manipur | 8 | 5 | 3 | 0 | 0 | 20 | +0.559 |
| Puducherry | 8 | 5 | 3 | 0 | 0 | 20 | +0.260 |
| Arunachal Pradesh | 8 | 3 | 5 | 0 | 0 | 12 | +0.104 |
| Mizoram | 8 | 2 | 6 | 0 | 0 | 8 | −1.724 |
| Sikkim | 8 | 1 | 7 | 0 | 0 | 4 | −2.078 |
| Meghalaya | 8 | 0 | 8 | 0 | 0 | 0 | −1.854 |

- Top five teams across Groups A and B advanced to the knockout stage. Top two teams from Group C advanced to the knockout stage and are promoted to Groups A and B for the next season. Top team from Group C advanced to the knockout stage and are promoted to Group C for the next season.
- Bottom two teams across Groups A and B relegated to the Group C for the next season. Bottom ranked team in Group-C is relegated to the Plate Group for the next season.

====== Quarter-finals ======
9 March 2019
Scorecard

| Punjab U-23 Men; 177 (46.4 overs) | v | Uttarakhand U-23 Men; 103 (32.5 overs) |

Punjab U-23 Men won by 73 Runs
Rajiv Gandhi International Cricket Stadium, Hyderabad

9 March 2019
Scorecard

| Mumbai U-23 Men; 251 (40.4 overs) | v | Jharkhand U-23 Men; 179 (40.5 overs) |

Mumbai U-23 Men won by 72 Runs
Gymkhana Ground, Hyderabad

10 March 2019
Scorecard

| Baroda U-23 Men; 245 (50 overs) | v | Delhi U-23 Men; 246/6 (49.5 overs) |

Delhi U-23 Men won by 4 Wickets
Rajiv Gandhi International Cricket Stadium, Hyderabad

10 March 2019
Scorecard

| Maharashtra U-23 Men; 101 (30.2 overs) | v | Vidarbha U-23 Men; 102/3 (28.4 overs) |

Vidarbha U-23 Men won by 7 Wickets
Gymkhana Ground, Hyderabad

====== Semi-finals ======
12 March 2019
Scorecard

| Vidarbha U-23 Men; 209 (50 overs) | v | Punjab U-23 Men; 151 (44.1 overs) |

Vidarbha U-23 Men won by 58 Runs
Rajiv Gandhi International Cricket Stadium, Hyderabad

12 March 2019
Scorecard

| Mumbai U-23 Men; 256/9 (50 overs) | v | Delhi U-23 Men; 260/1 (44.3 overs) |

Delhi U-23 Men won by 9 Wickets
Gymkhana Ground, Hyderabad

====== Final ======
15 March 2019
Scorecard

| Delhi U-23 Men; 211 (50 overs) | v | Vidarbha U-23 Men; 215/6 (48.2 overs) |

Vidarbha U-23 Men won by 4 Wickets
Rajiv Gandhi International Cricket Stadium, Hyderabad

==== Inter-University ====
Inter-University competition consisted of sole Vizzy Trophy tournament.

===== Vizzy Trophy =====
Vizzy Trophy
- Dates: 17 – 23 March 2019
- Cricket format: Inter-university One-day
- Champions: South Zone University Men
- Runners-up: North Zone University Men
- Participants: 4
- Matches: 7
- Most runs: Abhirath Reddy (202) (Sou Zon)
- Most wickets: K Shashank (13) (Sou Zon)
- Official website: bcci.tv

Vizzy Trophy was initially scheduled to be played in Knockout format from 20 to 23 March 2019. The tournament's format was changed to Round-Robin format which was followed by a final. It was played from 17 to 23 March 2019. South Zone University Men defeated North Zone University Men by 60 runs to win the tournament.

====== League ======
| Team | P | W | L | T | NR | Pts | NRR |
|---|---|---|---|---|---|---|---|
| South Zone University (C) | 3 | 3 | 0 | 0 | 0 | 12 | +0.682 |
| North Zone University (RU) | 3 | 2 | 1 | 0 | 0 | 8 | +0.881 |
| West Zone University | 3 | 1 | 2 | 0 | 0 | 4 | +0.281 |
| East Zone University | 3 | 0 | 3 | 0 | 0 | 0 | −1.734 |

Top two teams advanced to the final

====== Final ======
23 March 2019
Scorecard

| South Zone University Men; 274/8 (50 overs) | v | North Zone University Men; 214 (45.2 overs) |

South Zone University Men won by 60 Runs
ITM University, Gwalior

==== Under-19 ====
The Under-19 age group consisted of Cooch Behar Trophy(Multi-day competition), Vinoo Mankad Trophy(One-day competition) and One-Day Challenger Trophy.

===== Cooch Behar Trophy =====
Cooch Behar Trophy
- Dates: 19 November 2018 – 14 February 2019
- Cricket format: Men's U-19 Multi-Day
- Champions: Uttar Pradesh U-19 Men
- Runners-up: Vidarbha U-19 Men
- Participants: 35
- Matches: 143
- Most runs: Vathsal (1235) (Ker U-19)
- Most wickets: A Anand (28) (Bih U-19)
- Official website: bcci.tv

Cooch Behar Trophy was played from 19 November 2018 to 14 February 2019. The tournament's qualification structure was similar to Ranji Trophy. Uttar Pradesh U-19 Men defeated Vidarbha U-19 Men on first-innings basis in the final to win the trophy. Due to shortage of umpire and match officials, the third round of tournament was delayed from 17 to 20 December to 21 to 24 January and the knockouts were shifted from 29 January to 18 February. Manipur's Rex Singh took all 10 wickets in an innings in a league stage match against Arunachal Pradesh.

====== League ======
Points table

Elite Group-A and B

| Team | P | W | L | D | T | NR | Pts | Q |
|---|---|---|---|---|---|---|---|---|
| Uttar Pradesh | 8 | 6 | 0 | 2 | 0 | 0 | 45 | 2.370 |
| Maharashtra | 8 | 4 | 1 | 3 | 0 | 0 | 33 | 1.205 |
| Vidarbha | 8 | 4 | 3 | 1 | 0 | 0 | 29 | 1.435 |
| Madhya Pradesh | 8 | 3 | 1 | 4 | 0 | 0 | 28 | 1.250 |
| Rajasthan | 8 | 3 | 1 | 4 | 0 | 0 | 28 | 1.101 |
| Karnataka | 8 | 3 | 0 | 5 | 0 | 0 | 27 | 1.178 |
| Mumbai | 8 | 3 | 0 | 5 | 0 | 0 | 27 | 1.079 |
| Delhi | 8 | 3 | 1 | 4 | 0 | 0 | 26 | 1.081 |
| Bengal | 8 | 2 | 0 | 6 | 0 | 0 | 22 | 1.085 |
| Jharkhand | 8 | 2 | 3 | 3 | 0 | 0 | 17 | 0.930 |
| Gujarat | 8 | 2 | 3 | 3 | 0 | 0 | 17 | 0.842 |
| Punjab | 8 | 1 | 3 | 4 | 0 | 0 | 17 | 0.990 |
| Chhattisgarh | 8 | 2 | 5 | 1 | 0 | 0 | 15 | 0.771 |
| Hyderabad | 8 | 1 | 2 | 5 | 0 | 0 | 15 | 0.887 |
| Himachal | 8 | 1 | 2 | 5 | 0 | 0 | 13 | 0.729 |
| Haryana | 8 | 1 | 5 | 2 | 0 | 0 | 11 | 0.828 |
| Tamil Nadu | 8 | 0 | 4 | 4 | 0 | 0 | 8 | 0.709 |
| Baroda | 8 | 0 | 7 | 1 | 0 | 0 | 1 | 0.589 |

Elite Group-C

| Team | P | W | L | D | T | NR | Pts | Q |
|---|---|---|---|---|---|---|---|---|
| Andhra | 7 | 5 | 0 | 2 | 0 | 0 | 35 | 1.441 |
| Kerala | 7 | 4 | 0 | 3 | 0 | 0 | 35 | 1.778 |
| Saurashtra | 7 | 2 | 0 | 5 | 0 | 0 | 24 | 1.303 |
| Odisha | 7 | 3 | 2 | 2 | 0 | 0 | 22 | 0.879 |
| Jammu & Kashmir | 7 | 2 | 4 | 1 | 0 | 0 | 14 | 0.889 |
| Tripura | 7 | 2 | 4 | 1 | 0 | 0 | 14 | 0.788 |
| Assam | 7 | 2 | 4 | 1 | 0 | 0 | 13 | 0.876 |
| Goa | 7 | 0 | 6 | 1 | 0 | 0 | 1 | 0.505 |

Plate

| Team | P | W | L | D | T | NR | Pts | Q |
|---|---|---|---|---|---|---|---|---|
| Uttarakhand | 8 | 8 | 0 | 0 | 0 | 0 | 56 | 5.209 |
| Nagaland | 8 | 7 | 1 | 0 | 0 | 0 | 46 | 1.746 |
| Bihar | 8 | 6 | 2 | 0 | 0 | 0 | 41 | 1.504 |
| Meghalaya | 8 | 5 | 3 | 0 | 0 | 0 | 32 | 0.895 |
| Manipur | 8 | 4 | 4 | 0 | 0 | 0 | 27 | 0.915 |
| Puducherry | 8 | 2 | 5 | 1 | 0 | 0 | 15 | 0.700 |
| Sikkim | 8 | 2 | 5 | 1 | 0 | 0 | 13 | 0.639 |
| Arunachal Pradesh | 8 | 1 | 7 | 0 | 0 | 0 | 7 | 0.626 |
| Mizoram | 8 | 0 | 8 | 0 | 0 | 0 | 0 | 0.258 |

- Top five teams across Groups A and B advanced to the knockout stage. Top two teams from Group C advanced to the knockout stage and are promoted to Groups A and B for the next season. Top team from Group C advanced to the knockout stage and are promoted to Group C for the next season.
- Bottom two teams across Groups A and B relegated to the Group C for the next season. Bottom ranked team in Group-C is relegated to the Plate Group for the next season.

====== Quarter-finals ======
28 January-1 February 2019
Scorecard

| Uttarakhand U-19 Men; 101 (44.5 overs) & 86 (31.1 overs) | v | Uttar Pradesh U-19 Men; 272 (76.1 overs) |

Uttar Pradesh U-19 Men won by an innings and 85 Runs
Bharat Ratna Shri Atal Bihari Vajpayee Ekana Cricket Stadium, Lucknow

28 January-1 February 2019
Scorecard

| Maharashtra U-19 Men; 502 (128.2 overs) & 318 (82.2 overs) | v | Kerala U-19 Men; 266 (88.5 overs) & 211/3 (40 overs) |

Match Drawn (Maharashtra U-19 Men qualified on first innings lead)
Sanatana Dharma College Ground, Alappuzha

28 January-1 February 2019
Scorecard

| Andhra U-19 Men; 138 (43.1 overs) & 181 (60.2 overs) | v | Vidarbha U-19 Men; 173 (54.1 overs) & 147/3 (36.5 overs) |

Vidarbha U-19 Men won by 7 Wickets
CSR Sharma College Ground, Ongole

28 January-1 February 2019
Scorecard

| Rajasthan U-19 Men; 281 (99.4 overs) & 407 (136.1 overs) | v | Madhya Pradesh U-19 Men; 254 (88.3 overs) & 34/1 (10 overs) |

Match Drawn (Rajasthan U-19 Men qualified on first innings lead)
KL Saini Ground, Jaipur

====== Semi-finals ======
4–7 February 2019
Scorecard

| Rajasthan U-19 Men; 114 (41.2 overs) & 102 (34.2 overs) | v | Uttar Pradesh U-19 Men; 273 (105.1 overs) |

Uttar Pradesh U-19 Men won an innings and 57 Runs
KL Saini Ground, Jaipur

4–7 February 2019
Scorecard

| Vidarbha U-19 Men; 653 (192 overs) & 138/6d (45 overs) | v | Maharashtra U-19 Men; 239 (82.2 overs) & 43/3 (20 overs) |

Match Drawn (Vidarbha U-19 Men qualified on first innings lead)
Vidarbha Cricket Association Ground, Nagpur

====== Final ======
11–14 February 2019
Scorecard

| Uttar Pradesh U-19 Men; 283 (101.2 overs) & 305 (124.2 overs) | v | Vidarbha U-19 Men; 251 (95.2 overs) & 53/1 (15 overs) |

Match Drawn (Uttar Pradesh U-19 Men won on first innings lead)
Vidarbha Cricket Association Ground, Nagpur

===== Vinoo Mankad Trophy =====
Vinoo Mankad Trophy
- Dates: 5 October 2018 – 4 November 2018
- Cricket format: Men's U-19 One-day
- Champions: Vidarbha U-19 Men
- Runners-up: Tamil Nadu U-19 Men
- Participants: 35
- Matches: 143
- Most runs: Piyush Kumar Singh (534) (Bih U-19)
- Most wickets: Rohit Dattatraya (28) (Vid U-19)
- Official website: bcci.tv

Vinoo Mankad Trophy was played from 5 October to 4 November 2018. The tournament's qualification structure was similar to Ranji Trophy. Vidarbha U-19 Men defeated Tamil Nadu U-19 Men by 83 runs in the final to win their maiden trophy.

====== League ======
Points table

Elite Group-A and B

| Team | P | W | L | T | NR | Pts | NRR |
|---|---|---|---|---|---|---|---|
| Andhra | 8 | 7 | 1 | 0 | 0 | 28 | +1.085 |
| Uttar Pradesh | 8 | 7 | 1 | 0 | 0 | 28 | +0.799 |
| Delhi | 8 | 6 | 2 | 0 | 0 | 24 | +1.336 |
| Madhya Pradesh | 8 | 6 | 2 | 0 | 0 | 24 | +1.121 |
| Vidarbha | 8 | 6 | 2 | 0 | 0 | 24 | +0.038 |
| Punjab | 8 | 6 | 2 | 0 | 0 | 24 | +0.918 |
| Karnataka | 8 | 5 | 3 | 0 | 0 | 20 | +0.216 |
| Mumbai | 8 | 5 | 3 | 0 | 0 | 20 | +0.864 |
| Haryana | 8 | 4 | 4 | 0 | 0 | 16 | +0.484 |
| Bengal | 8 | 4 | 4 | 0 | 0 | 16 | +0.295 |
| Hyderabad | 8 | 4 | 4 | 0 | 0 | 16 | +0.170 |
| Maharashtra | 8 | 3 | 5 | 0 | 0 | 12 | −0.186 |
| Jharkhand | 8 | 3 | 5 | 0 | 0 | 12 | −0.465 |
| Gujarat | 8 | 2 | 6 | 0 | 0 | 8 | −0.430 |
| Tripura | 8 | 2 | 6 | 0 | 0 | 8 | −1.434 |
| Chhattisgarh | 8 | 1 | 7 | 0 | 0 | 4 | −1.551 |
| Assam | 8 | 1 | 7 | 0 | 0 | 4 | −2.131 |
| Baroda | 8 | 0 | 8 | 0 | 0 | 0 | −1.055 |

Elite Group-C

| Team | P | W | L | T | NR | Pts | NRR |
|---|---|---|---|---|---|---|---|
| Tamil Nadu | 7 | 7 | 0 | 0 | 0 | 28 | +0.718 |
| Rajasthan | 7 | 6 | 1 | 0 | 0 | 24 | +1.421 |
| Kerala | 7 | 4 | 3 | 0 | 0 | 16 | +0.099 |
| Saurashtra | 7 | 3 | 4 | 0 | 0 | 12 | +0.198 |
| Himachal | 7 | 3 | 4 | 0 | 0 | 12 | −0.037 |
| Jammu & Kashmir | 7 | 3 | 4 | 0 | 0 | 12 | −0.279 |
| Odisha | 7 | 2 | 5 | 0 | 0 | 8 | −0.611 |
| Goa | 7 | 0 | 7 | 0 | 0 | 0 | −1.446 |

Plate

| Team | P | W | L | T | NR | Pts | NRR |
|---|---|---|---|---|---|---|---|
| Bihar | 8 | 6 | 0 | 0 | 2 | 28 | +3.271 |
| Nagaland | 8 | 6 | 1 | 0 | 1 | 26 | +1.614 |
| Uttarakhand | 8 | 5 | 1 | 0 | 2 | 24 | +2.927 |
| Manipur | 8 | 5 | 2 | 0 | 1 | 22 | +1.563 |
| Meghalaya | 8 | 3 | 3 | 0 | 2 | 16 | +0.502 |
| Arunachal Pradesh | 8 | 3 | 4 | 0 | 1 | 14 | −1.217 |
| Puducherry | 8 | 1 | 6 | 0 | 1 | 6 | −0.642 |
| Mizoram | 8 | 1 | 6 | 0 | 1 | 6 | −2.731 |
| Sikkim | 8 | 0 | 7 | 0 | 1 | 2 | −3.867 |

- Top five teams across Groups A and B advanced to the knockout stage. Top two teams from Group C advanced to the knockout stage and are promoted to Groups A and B for the next season. Top team from Group C advanced to the knockout stage and are promoted to Group C for the next season.
- Bottom two teams across Groups A and B relegated to the Group C for the next season. Bottom ranked team in Group-C is relegated to the Plate Group for the next season.

====== Quarter-finals ======
29 October 2018
Scorecard

| Andhra U-19 Men; 263/7 (50 overs) | v | Bihar U-19 Men; 248/8 (50 overs) |

Andhra U-19 Men won by 15 Runs
Vidarbha Cricket Association Ground, Nagpur

29 October 2018
Scorecard

| Rajasthan U-19 Men; 257 (50 overs) | v | Uttar Pradesh U-19 Men; 197 (48.1 overs) |

Rajasthan U-19 Men won by 60 Runs
Vidarbha Cricket Association Stadium, Nagpur

30 October 2018
Scorecard

| Delhi U-19 Men; 169 (43.5 overs) | v | Tamil Nadu U-19 Men; 170/4 (33.3 overs) |

Tamil Nadu U-19 Men won by 6 Wickets
Vidarbha Cricket Association Ground, Nagpur

30 October 2018
Scorecard

| Madhya Pradesh U-19 Men; 283/8 (50 overs) | v | Vidarbha U-19 Men; 284/2 (45.5 overs) |

Vidarbha U-19 Men won by 8 Wickets
Vidarbha Cricket Association Stadium, Nagpur

====== Semi-finals ======
1 November 2018
Scorecard

| Andhra U-19 Men; 201/8 (50 overs) | v | Vidarbha U-19 Men; 202/8 (48.3 overs) |

Vidarbha U-19 Men won by 2 Wickets
Vidarbha Cricket Association Ground, Nagpur

1 November 2018
Scorecard

| Rajasthan U-19 Men; 148 (50 overs) | v | Tamil Nadu U-19 Men; 150/8 (38.1 overs) |

Tamil Nadu U-19 Men won by 2 Wickets
Vidarbha Cricket Association Stadium, Nagpur

====== Final ======
4 November 2018
Scorecard

| Vidarbha U-19 Men; 297/6 (50 overs) | v | Tamil Nadu U-19 Men; 214 (45 overs) |

Vidarbha U-19 Men won by 83 Runs
Vidarbha Cricket Association Ground, Nagpur

===== Men's U19 One-Day Challenger Trophy =====
Men's U19 One-Day Challenger Trophy
- Dates: 10 – 16 November 2018
- Cricket format: U-19 One-day
- Champions: India Green Under-19 Men
- Runners-up: India Blue Under-19 Men
- Participants: 4
- Matches: 7
- Most runs: Pradosh Ranjan Paul (223) (Ind-U-19 Blue)
- Most wickets: Jaymeet Patel (7) (Ind-U-19 Yellow)
- Official website: bcci.tv

Men's U19 One-Day Challenger Trophy was played from 10 to 16 November 2018 at Lucknow. India Green Under-19 Men defeated India Blue Under-19 Men by 6 wickets in the final to win the tournament.

====== League ======
| Team | P | W | L | T | NR | Pts | NRR |
|---|---|---|---|---|---|---|---|
| India Green U-19 Men (C) | 3 | 3 | 0 | 0 | 0 | 12 | +1.269 |
| India Blue U-19 Men (RU) | 3 | 2 | 1 | 0 | 0 | 8 | −0.117 |
| India Yellow U-19 Men | 3 | 1 | 2 | 0 | 0 | 4 | +0.153 |
| India Red U-19 Men | 3 | 0 | 3 | 0 | 0 | 0 | −1.440 |

Top two teams advanced to the final

====== Final ======
16 November 2018
Scorecard

| India Blue U-19 Men; 206 (47.3 overs) | v | India Green U-19 Men; 209/4 (43.4 overs) |

India Green U-19 Men won by 6 Wickets
Ekana International Cricket Stadium, Lucknow

==== Under-16 ====
The Under-16 age group solely consisted of Vijay Merchant Trophy(Multi-day competition).

===== Vijay Merchant Trophy =====
Vijay Merchant Trophy
- Dates: 21 October 2018 – 15 January 2019
- Cricket format: Men's U-16 Multi-Day
- Champions: Haryana U-16 Men
- Runners-up: Jharkhand U-16 Men
- Participants: 35
- Matches: 97
- Most runs: Aryan Hooda (903) (Jha U-16)
- Most wickets: Abhishek (46) (Jha U-16)
- Official website: bcci.tv

Vijay Merchant Trophy was played from 21 October 2018 to 15 January 2019. It remained the only tournament to be played at intrazonal basis at round-robin stage. The tournament was originally scheduled to start from 3 October but was postponed to 21 October after the request from state associations. Mumbai Under-16 team's captain Musheer Khan was banned for three years for misbehaviour towards his teammates. Haryana Under-16 defeated Jharkhand Under-16 on first-innings basis in the final to win the tournament for the first time.

====== League ======
Points table

North Zone

| Team | P | W | L | D | T | NR | Pts | Q |
|---|---|---|---|---|---|---|---|---|
| Haryana | 4 | 2 | 0 | 2 | 0 | 0 | 20 | 2.538 |
| Delhi | 4 | 2 | 0 | 2 | 0 | 0 | 18 | 1.520 |
| Punjab | 4 | 0 | 0 | 4 | 0 | 0 | 8 | 1.283 |
| Himachal | 4 | 0 | 2 | 2 | 0 | 0 | 2 | 0.403 |
| Jammu & Kashmir | 4 | 0 | 2 | 2 | 0 | 0 | 2 | 0.272 |

Central Zone

| Team | P | W | L | D | T | NR | Pts | Q |
|---|---|---|---|---|---|---|---|---|
| Uttar Pradesh | 5 | 3 | 0 | 2 | 0 | 0 | 26 | 2.805 |
| Madhya Pradesh | 5 | 2 | 0 | 3 | 0 | 0 | 19 | 1.153 |
| Vidarbha | 5 | 1 | 1 | 3 | 0 | 0 | 12 | 1.202 |
| Chhattisgarh | 5 | 1 | 2 | 2 | 0 | 0 | 9 | 0.635 |
| Rajasthan | 5 | 0 | 2 | 3 | 0 | 0 | 9 | 0.983 |
| Uttarakhand | 5 | 0 | 2 | 3 | 0 | 0 | 3 | 0.376 |

West Zone

| Team | P | W | L | D | T | NR | Pts | Q |
|---|---|---|---|---|---|---|---|---|
| Mumbai | 4 | 1 | 0 | 3 | 0 | 0 | 16 | 1.699 |
| Maharashtra | 4 | 1 | 0 | 3 | 0 | 0 | 9 | 1.576 |
| Saurashtra | 4 | 0 | 0 | 4 | 0 | 0 | 8 | 1.021 |
| Gujarat | 4 | 0 | 0 | 4 | 0 | 0 | 6 | 0.880 |
| Baroda | 4 | 0 | 2 | 2 | 0 | 0 | 4 | 0.519 |

East Zone

| Team | P | W | L | D | T | NR | Pts | Q |
|---|---|---|---|---|---|---|---|---|
| Bengal | 5 | 4 | 0 | 1 | 0 | 0 | 28 | 2.338 |
| Jharkhand | 5 | 3 | 0 | 2 | 0 | 0 | 25 | 2.067 |
| Odisha | 5 | 1 | 1 | 3 | 0 | 0 | 14 | 0.971 |
| Bihar | 5 | 1 | 2 | 2 | 0 | 0 | 9 | 0.797 |
| Tripura | 5 | 1 | 4 | 0 | 0 | 0 | 7 | 0.485 |
| Assam | 5 | 0 | 3 | 2 | 0 | 0 | 4 | 0.501 |

South Zone

| Team | P | W | L | D | T | NR | Pts | Q |
|---|---|---|---|---|---|---|---|---|
| Tamil Nadu | 6 | 2 | 0 | 4 | 0 | 0 | 26 | 1.571 |
| Karnataka | 6 | 2 | 0 | 4 | 0 | 0 | 22 | 1.449 |
| Andhra | 6 | 2 | 1 | 3 | 0 | 0 | 21 | 1.643 |
| Kerala | 6 | 2 | 0 | 4 | 0 | 0 | 17 | 1.196 |
| Hyderabad | 6 | 0 | 1 | 5 | 0 | 0 | 7 | 0.945 |
| Puducherry | 6 | 0 | 3 | 3 | 0 | 0 | 7 | 0.377 |
| Goa | 6 | 0 | 3 | 3 | 0 | 0 | 3 | 0.399 |

North East and Bihar

| Team | P | W | L | D | T | NR | Pts | Q |
|---|---|---|---|---|---|---|---|---|
| Meghalaya | 5 | 5 | 0 | 0 | 0 | 0 | 31 | 1.013 |
| Nagaland | 5 | 4 | 1 | 0 | 0 | 0 | 26 | 1.365 |
| Manipur | 5 | 3 | 2 | 0 | 0 | 0 | 20 | 1.416 |
| Mizoram | 5 | 2 | 3 | 0 | 0 | 0 | 12 | 0.576 |
| Arunachal Pradesh | 5 | 1 | 4 | 0 | 0 | 0 | 6 | 0.751 |
| Sikkim | 5 | 0 | 5 | 0 | 0 | 0 | 0 | 0.452 |

- Top 2 teams from each group advanced to the knockout stage.

====== Pre-Quarter-finals ======
8–11 December 2018
Scorecard

| Nagaland U-16 Men; 157 (38.3 overs) & 134 (33.1 overs) | v | Uttar Pradesh U-16 Men; 561/9d (98.5 overs) |

Uttar Pradesh U-16 Men won by an innings and 270 Runs
Keenan Stadium, Jamshedpur

8–11 December 2018
Scorecard

| Karnataka U-16 Men; 174 (71.2 overs) & 318 (117 overs) | v | Jharkhand U-16 Men; 518/9d (118 overs) |

Jharkhand U-16 Men won by an innings and 26 Runs
Railway Stadium, Dhanbad

15–18 December 2018
Scorecard

| Madhya Pradesh U-16 Men; 316 (82.3 overs) & 262 (76.3 overs) | v | Delhi U-16 Men; 285 (81.3 overs) & 168 (60 overs) |

Madhya Pradesh U-16 Men won by 125 Runs
Krishnagiri Stadium, Wayanad

15–18 December 2018
Scorecard

| Maharashtra U-16 Men; 623/4d (163 overs) | v | Meghalaya U-16 Men; 65 (52 overs) & 84 (31.1 overs) |

Maharashtra U-16 Men won by an innings and 474 Runs
Dr. Y. S. Rajasekhara Reddy ACA–VDCA Cricket Stadium, Kadapa

====== Quarter-finals ======
22–25 December 2018
Scorecard

| Mumbai U-16 Men; 113 (51 overs) & 265 (106.5 overs) | v | Uttar Pradesh U-16 Men; 409 (110.4 overs) |

Uttar Pradesh U-16 Men won by an innings and 31 Runs
Dr. Y. S. Rajasekhara Reddy ACA–VDCA Cricket Stadium, Kadapa

22–25 December 2018
Scorecard

| Jharkhand U-16 Men; 226 (84.3 overs) & 176 (63.2 overs) | v | Tamil Nadu U-16 Men; 88 (37 overs) & 229 (113.1 overs) |

Jharkhand U-16 Men won by 85 Runs
Gokulbhai Somabhai Patel Stadium, Nadiad

29 December 2018 – 1 January 2019
Scorecard

| Madhya Pradesh U-16 Men; 422 (142 overs) & 337 (81.2 overs) | v | Bengal U-16 Men; 127 (30.5 overs) & 228 (45.4 overs) |

Madhya Pradesh U-16 Men won by 404 Runs
Jadavpur University Campus, Kolkata

29 December 2018 – 1 January 2019
Scorecard

| Haryana U-16 Men; 198 (71.5 overs) & 359 (130.3 overs) | v | Maharashtra U-16 Men; 96 (50.5 overs) & 140 (55.3 overs) |

Haryana U-16 Men won by 321 Runs
Dr. Y. S. Rajasekhara Reddy ACA–VDCA Cricket Stadium, Kadapa

====== Semi-finals ======
5–8 January 2019
Scorecard

| Haryana U-16 Men; 480 (159.4 overs) & 255/4 (76 overs) | v | Uttar Pradesh U-16 Men; 353 (123.4 overs) |

Match Drawn (Haryana U-16 Men qualified on first innings lead)
Gokulbhai Somabhai Patel Stadium, Nadiad

5–8 January 2019
Scorecard

| Madhya Pradesh U-16 Men; 236 (73 overs) & 363 (75.1 overs) | v | Jharkhand U-16 Men; 383 (142.4 overs) & 196/3 (79 overs) |

Match Drawn (Jharkhand U-16 Men qualified on first innings lead)
Shastri Maidan, Anand

====== Final ======
12–15 January 2019
Scorecard

| Haryana U-16 Men; 247 (101.2 overs) & 502/9d (66.1 overs) | v | Jharkhand U-16 Men; 186 (163.1 overs) & 93/3 (20 overs) |

Match Drawn (Haryana U-16 Men win on first innings lead)
Devineni Venkata Ramana Praneetha Ground, Mulapadu

=== Domestic Women's ===
2018–19 India's Junior Women's domestic cricket season
Women's U23 One-Day League
- Champions: Bengal Under-23 Women
- Runners-up: Mumbai Under-23 Women
- Most runs: Jemimah Rodrigues (960) (Mum U-23)
- Most wickets: D D Dutta (31) (Meg U-23)

Women's U23 One-Day Challenger Trophy
- Champions: India Blue Under-23 Women
- Runners-up: India Green Under-23 Women
- Most runs: Shafali Verma (114) (Ind-U-23 Blue)
- Most wickets: Arundhati Reddy (7) (Ind-U-23 Blue)

Women's U23 T20 League
- Champions: Railways Under-23 Women
- Runners-up: Maharashtra Under-23 Women
- Most runs: Devika Vaidya (395) (Mah U-23)
- Most wickets: MD Sonawane (22) (Mah U-23)

Women's U23 T20 Challenger Trophy
- Champions: India Green Under-23 Women
- Runners-up: India Blue Under-23 Women
- Most runs: Disha Kasat (89) (Ind-U-23 Green)
- Most wickets: Sushree Dibyadarshini (6) (Ind-U-23 Green)

Women's U19 One-Day League
- Champions: Bengal Under-19 Women
- Runners-up: Delhi Under-19 Women
- Most runs: S K Raut (440) (Mum U-19)
- Most wickets: Tejashwini N Duragad (26) (Goa U-19)

Women's U19 T20 League
- Champions: Uttar Pradesh Under-19 Women
- Runners-up: Andhra Under-19 Women
- Most runs: Shobha Devi (391) (U.P. U-19)
- Most wickets: Anjali Singh (19) (U.P. U-19)

Women's U19 T20 Challenger Trophy
- Champions: India Red U-19 Women
- Runners-up: India Blue U-19 Women
- Most runs: Ellutla Padmaja (63) (Ind-U-19 Blue)
- Most wickets: Shafali Verma (4) (Ind-U-19 Green)

The Inter Zonal competition and Multi-Day Game format was eliminated from the season. The junior women's domestic season began in October with Women's U23 T20 Challenger Trophy. India Green Under-23 Women defeated India Blue Under-23 Women by 8 wickets to win the tournament. Uttar Pradesh U-23 Women defeated Andhra U-23 Women in the final by 18 runs to win the Women's U19 T20 League. India Red Under-19 Women defeated India Blue Under-19 Women by 10 runs to win the Women's U19 T20 Challenger Trophy. Railways U-23 Women defeated Maharashtra U-23 Women in the final by 3 wickets to win the Women's U23 T20 League. Bengal U-19 Women defeated Delhi U-19 Women by 26 runs (by VJD method) to win the Women's U19 One-Day League. India Blue Under-23 Women defeated India Green Under-23 Women by 5 wickets to win the Women's U23 One-Day Challenger Trophy.

| Dates | Tournament | Age-Group (Matches Format) | Teams Format (No. of Teams) | Tournament format (No. of Matches) | Winners |
|---|---|---|---|---|---|
| 4 October 2018– 8 October 2018 | Women's U23 T20; Challenger Trophy | Women's U-23 (Twenty20) | Intra-national (3 Teams) | Round-robin and Finals (4 Matches) | India Green; Under-23 Women |
| 14 October 2018– 3 November 2018 | Women's U19; T20 League | Women's U-19 (Twenty20) | Inter-state (35 Teams) | Round-robin and Playoff format (126 Matches) | Uttar Pradesh; Under-19 Women |
| 12 November 2018– 16 November 2018 | Women's U19 T20; Challenger Trophy | Women's U-19 (Twenty20) | Intra-national (3 Teams) | Round-robin and Finals (4 Matches) | India Red; U-19 Women |
| 14 January 2019– 5 February 2019 | Women's U23; T20 League | Women's U-23 (Twenty20) | Inter-state (36 Teams) | Round-robin and Playoff format (133 Matches) | Railways; Under-23 Women |
| 10 February 2019– 11 March 2019 | Women's U19; One-Day; League | Women's U-19 (One-Day) | Inter-state (35 Teams) | Round-robin and Playoff format (143 Matches) | Bengal; Under-19 Women |
| 17 March 2019– 14 April 2019 | Women's U23; One-Day; League | Women's U-23 (One-Day) | Inter-state (36 Teams) | Round-robin and Playoff format (151 Matches) | Bengal; Under-23 Women |
| 20 April 2019– 24 April 2019 | Women's U23; One-Day; Challenger Trophy | Women's U-23 (One-Day) | Intra-national (3 Teams) | Round-robin and Finals (4 Matches) | India Blue; Under-23 Women |

==== Under-23 ====
The Under-23 age group consisted of One-Day League, One-Day Challenger Trophy, T20 League and T20 Challenger Trophy.

===== Women's U23 One-Day League =====
Women's U23 One-Day League
- Dates: 17 March – 14 April 2019
- Cricket format: Women's U-23 One-day
- Champions: Bengal Under-23 Women
- Runners-up: Mumbai Under-23 Women
- Participants: 36
- Matches: 151
- Most runs: Jemimah Rodrigues (960) (Mum U-23)
- Most wickets: D D Dutta (31) (Meg U-23)
- Official website: bcci.tv

Women's U23 One-Day League was played from 17 March to 14 April 2019. Bengal U-23 Women defeated Mumbai U-23 Women by 2 runs to win the tournament.

====== League ======
Points table

Elite Group-A and B

| Team | P | W | L | T | NR | Pts | NRR |
|---|---|---|---|---|---|---|---|
| Bengal | 8 | 8 | 0 | 0 | 0 | 32 | +2.154 |
| Himachal | 8 | 8 | 0 | 0 | 0 | 32 | +0.834 |
| Mumbai | 8 | 6 | 2 | 0 | 0 | 24 | +0.873 |
| Delhi | 8 | 6 | 2 | 0 | 0 | 24 | +0.347 |
| Karnataka | 8 | 6 | 2 | 0 | 0 | 24 | +0.256 |
| Kerala | 8 | 6 | 2 | 0 | 0 | 24 | +0.227 |
| Maharashtra | 8 | 5 | 3 | 0 | 0 | 20 | +0.552 |
| Railways | 8 | 5 | 3 | 0 | 0 | 20 | +0.482 |
| Andhra | 8 | 5 | 3 | 0 | 0 | 20 | +0.460 |
| Uttar Pradesh | 8 | 4 | 4 | 0 | 0 | 16 | +0.248 |
| Madhya Pradesh | 8 | 3 | 5 | 0 | 0 | 12 | −0.314 |
| Punjab | 8 | 2 | 5 | 1 | 0 | 10 | −0.225 |
| Odisha | 8 | 2 | 5 | 1 | 0 | 10 | −0.590 |
| Vidarbha | 8 | 2 | 6 | 0 | 0 | 8 | −0.202 |
| Gujarat | 8 | 1 | 7 | 0 | 0 | 4 | −0.764 |
| Hyderabad | 8 | 1 | 7 | 0 | 0 | 4 | −0.790 |
| Tamil Nadu | 8 | 1 | 7 | 0 | 0 | 4 | −1.823 |
| Tripura | 8 | 0 | 8 | 0 | 0 | 0 | −1.987 |

Elite Group-C

| Team | P | W | L | T | NR | Pts | NRR |
|---|---|---|---|---|---|---|---|
| Jharkhand | 8 | 7 | 1 | 0 | 0 | 28 | +0.959 |
| Baroda | 8 | 6 | 2 | 0 | 0 | 24 | +1.453 |
| Haryana | 8 | 5 | 3 | 0 | 0 | 20 | +0.770 |
| Assam | 8 | 4 | 4 | 0 | 0 | 16 | −0.308 |
| Rajasthan | 8 | 4 | 4 | 0 | 0 | 16 | +0.930 |
| Goa | 8 | 4 | 4 | 0 | 0 | 16 | +0.520 |
| Chhattisgarh | 8 | 3 | 5 | 0 | 0 | 12 | −0.529 |
| Saurashtra | 8 | 2 | 6 | 0 | 0 | 8 | −1.659 |
| Jammu & Kashmir | 8 | 1 | 7 | 0 | 0 | 4 | −1.899 |

Plate

| Team | P | W | L | T | NR | Pts | NRR |
|---|---|---|---|---|---|---|---|
| Uttarakhand | 8 | 8 | 0 | 0 | 0 | 32 | +4.043 |
| Bihar | 8 | 7 | 1 | 0 | 0 | 28 | +1.174 |
| Nagaland | 8 | 6 | 2 | 0 | 0 | 24 | +0.655 |
| Arunachal Pradesh | 8 | 4 | 4 | 0 | 0 | 16 | −0.300 |
| Meghalaya | 8 | 4 | 4 | 0 | 0 | 16 | −0.744 |
| Pudicherry | 8 | 3 | 5 | 0 | 0 | 12 | +0.155 |
| Sikkim | 8 | 2 | 6 | 0 | 0 | 8 | −0.614 |
| Manipur | 8 | 2 | 6 | 0 | 0 | 8 | −1.055 |
| Mizoram | 8 | 0 | 8 | 0 | 0 | 0 | −2.654 |

- Top five teams across Groups A and B advanced to the knockout stage. Top two teams from Group C advanced to the knockout stage and are promoted to Groups A and B for the next season. Top team from Group C advanced to the knockout stage and are promoted to Group C for the next season.
- Bottom two teams across Groups A and B relegated to the Group C for the next season. Bottom ranked team in Group-C is relegated to the Plate Group for the next season.

====== Quarter-finals ======
9 April 2019
Scorecard

| Uttarakhand U-23 Women; 102 (48.5 overs) | v | Bengal U-23 Women; 103/2 (22.5 overs) |

Bengal U-23 Women won by 7 Wickets
Vidarbha Cricket Association Ground, Nagpur

9 April 2019
Scorecard

| Himachal U-23 Women; 222/8 (50 overs) | v | Baroda U-23 Women; 223/6 (48.1 overs) |

Himachal U-23 Women won by 2 Wickets
VCA Kalmana Cricket Ground, Nagpur

10 April 2019
Scorecard

| Mumbai U-23 Women; 273/6 (50 overs) | v | Jharkhand U-23 Women; 200 (46 overs) |

Mumbai U-23 Women won by 73 Runs
Vidarbha Cricket Association Ground, Nagpur

10 April 2019
Scorecard

| Delhi U-23 Women; 187/9 (50 overs) | v | Karnataka U-23 Women; 145 (49.1 overs) |

Delhi U-23 Women won by 42 Runs
VCA Kalmana Cricket Ground, Nagpur

====== Semi-finals ======
12 April 2019
Scorecard

| Bengal U-23 Women; 203/9 (50 overs) | v | Delhi U-23 Women; 146/9 (50 overs) |

Delhi U-23 Women won by 57 Runs
Vidarbha Cricket Association Ground, Nagpur

12 April 2019
Scorecard

| Mumbai U-23 Women; 263/4 (50 overs) | v | Himachal U-23 Women; 125 (36.2 overs) |

Mumbai U-23 Women won by 138 Runs
VCA Kalmana Cricket Ground, Nagpur

====== Final ======
14 April 2019
Scorecard

| Bengal U-23 Women; 181/8 (44 overs) | v | Mumbai U-23 Women; 110/5 (49.1 overs) |

Bengal U-23 Women won by 2 Wickets
Vidarbha Cricket Association Ground, Nagpur

===== Women's U23 One-Day Challenger Trophy =====
Women's U23 One-Day Challenger Trophy
- Dates: 20 – 24 April 2019
- Cricket format: Women's U-23 One-Day
- Champions: India Blue U-23 Women
- Runners-up: India Green U-23 Women
- Participants: 3
- Matches: 4
- Most runs: Shafali Verma (114) (Ind-U-23 Blue)
- Most wickets: Arundhati Reddy (7) (Ind-U-23 Blue)
- Official website: bcci.tv

Women's U23 One-Day Challenger Trophy was played from 20 to 24 April 2019 at Ranchi. India Blue Under-23 Women defeated India Green Under-23 Women by 5 wickets in the final to win the tournament.

====== League ======
| Team | P | W | L | T | NR | Pts | NRR |
|---|---|---|---|---|---|---|---|
| India Blue U-23 Women (C) | 2 | 2 | 0 | 0 | 0 | 8 | +0.294 |
| India Green U-23 Women (RU) | 2 | 1 | 1 | 0 | 0 | 4 | +0.872 |
| India Red U-23 Women | 2 | 0 | 2 | 0 | 0 | 0 | −1.150 |

Top two teams advanced to the final

====== Final ======
8 October 2018
Scorecard

| India Green U-23 Women; 117 (44 overs) | v | India Blue U-23 Women; 120/5 (28.4 overs) |

India Green U-23 Women won by 5 Wickets
JSCA International Stadium Complex, Ranchi

===== Women's U23 T20 League =====
Women's U23 T20 League
- Dates: 14 January – 5 February 2019
- Cricket format: Women's U-23 T20
- Champions: Railways U-23 Women
- Runners-up: Maharashtra U-23 Women
- Participants: 36
- Matches: 133
- Most runs: Devika Vaidya (395) (Mah U-23)
- Most wickets: MD Sonawane (22) (Mah U-23)
- Official website: bcci.tv

Women's U23 T20 League was played from 14 January to 5 February 2019. Two teams each from 5 groups qualified for the 2-group Super League. Winners of the two groups met in the final. Railways U-23 Women defeated Maharashtra U-23 Women in the final by 3 wickets to win the tournament.

====== League ======
Points table

Group-A

| Team | P | W | L | T | NR | Pts | NRR |
|---|---|---|---|---|---|---|---|
| Baroda | 6 | 6 | 0 | 0 | 0 | 24 | +2.907 |
| Punjab | 6 | 5 | 1 | 0 | 0 | 20 | +1.163 |
| Kerala | 6 | 4 | 2 | 0 | 0 | 16 | +2.167 |
| Uttar Pradesh | 6 | 3 | 3 | 0 | 0 | 12 | +1.407 |
| Goa | 6 | 2 | 4 | 0 | 0 | 8 | +0.244 |
| Meghalaya | 6 | 1 | 5 | 0 | 0 | 4 | −4.109 |
| Manipur | 6 | 0 | 6 | 0 | 0 | 0 | −5.746 |

Group-B

| Team | P | W | L | T | NR | Pts | NRR |
|---|---|---|---|---|---|---|---|
| Maharashtra | 6 | 5 | 1 | 0 | 0 | 20 | +2.938 |
| Jharkhand | 6 | 4 | 2 | 0 | 0 | 16 | +2.050 |
| Rajasthan | 6 | 4 | 2 | 0 | 0 | 16 | +1.323 |
| Hyderabad | 6 | 4 | 2 | 0 | 0 | 16 | +1.216 |
| Assam | 6 | 3 | 3 | 0 | 0 | 12 | +0.508 |
| Nagaland | 6 | 1 | 5 | 0 | 0 | 4 | −1.977 |
| Sikkim | 6 | 0 | 6 | 0 | 0 | 0 | −6.338 |

Group-C

| Team | P | W | L | T | NR | Pts | NRR |
|---|---|---|---|---|---|---|---|
| Mumbai | 6 | 5 | 0 | 0 | 1 | 22 | +2.121 |
| Delhi | 6 | 4 | 1 | 0 | 1 | 18 | +1.790 |
| Himachal | 6 | 4 | 2 | 0 | 0 | 16 | +1.998 |
| Haryana | 6 | 3 | 3 | 0 | 0 | 12 | +2.291 |
| Tripura | 6 | 3 | 3 | 0 | 0 | 12 | +0.496 |
| Bihar | 6 | 1 | 5 | 0 | 0 | 4 | −3.742 |
| Arunachal Pradesh | 6 | 0 | 6 | 0 | 0 | 0 | −6.323 |

Group-D

| Team | P | W | L | T | NR | Pts | NRR |
|---|---|---|---|---|---|---|---|
| Bengal | 6 | 6 | 0 | 0 | 0 | 24 | +0.759 |
| Gujarat | 6 | 5 | 1 | 0 | 0 | 20 | +1.227 |
| Andhra | 6 | 4 | 2 | 0 | 0 | 16 | +0.968 |
| Karnataka | 6 | 3 | 3 | 0 | 0 | 12 | +0.195 |
| Tamil Nadu | 6 | 1 | 5 | 0 | 0 | 4 | −0.457 |
| Chhattisgarh | 6 | 1 | 5 | 0 | 0 | 4 | −0.583 |
| Uttarakhand | 6 | 1 | 5 | 0 | 0 | 4 | −2.310 |

Group-E

| Team | P | W | L | T | NR | Pts | NRR |
|---|---|---|---|---|---|---|---|
| Railways | 7 | 7 | 0 | 0 | 0 | 28 | +3.698 |
| Vidarbha | 7 | 6 | 1 | 0 | 0 | 24 | +3.367 |
| Odisha | 7 | 5 | 2 | 0 | 0 | 20 | +2.600 |
| Madhya Pradesh | 7 | 4 | 3 | 0 | 0 | 16 | +2.146 |
| Saurashtra | 7 | 3 | 4 | 0 | 0 | 12 | −0.002 |
| Puducherry | 7 | 2 | 5 | 0 | 0 | 8 | −1.248 |
| Jammu & Kashmir | 7 | 1 | 6 | 0 | 0 | 4 | −2.026 |
| Mizoram | 7 | 0 | 7 | 0 | 0 | 0 | −8.415 |

- Top 2 teams from each group advanced to the Super League.

====== Super League ======
Points table

Super Group-A

| Team | P | W | L | T | NR | Pts | NRR |
|---|---|---|---|---|---|---|---|
| Railways | 4 | 4 | 0 | 0 | 0 | 16 | +0.308 |
| Jharkhand | 4 | 2 | 2 | 0 | 0 | 8 | +0.656 |
| Mumbai | 4 | 2 | 2 | 0 | 0 | 8 | +0.342 |
| Gujarat | 4 | 2 | 2 | 0 | 0 | 8 | −0.361 |
| Baroda | 4 | 0 | 4 | 0 | 0 | 0 | −0.710 |

Super Group-B

| Team | P | W | L | T | NR | Pts | NRR |
|---|---|---|---|---|---|---|---|
| Maharashtra | 4 | 4 | 0 | 0 | 0 | 16 | +1.746 |
| Bengal | 4 | 3 | 1 | 0 | 0 | 12 | +0.188 |
| Delhi | 4 | 2 | 2 | 0 | 0 | 8 | −0.261 |
| Vidarbha | 4 | 1 | 3 | 0 | 0 | 4 | −0.950 |
| Punjab | 4 | 0 | 4 | 0 | 0 | 0 | −1.013 |

- Top team from both the groups advanced to the final.

====== Final ======
5 February 2019
Scorecard

| Maharashtra U-23 Women; 116/2 (20 overs) | v | Railways U-23 Women; 117/7 (18.3 overs) |

Railways U-23 Women won by 3 wickets
Sawai Mansingh Stadium, Jaipur

===== Women's U23 T20 Challenger Trophy =====
Women's U23 T20 Challenger Trophy
- Dates: 4 – 8 October 2018
- Cricket format: Women's U-23 T20
- Champions: India Green U-23 Women
- Runners-up: India Blue U-23 Women
- Participants: 3
- Matches: 4
- Most runs: Disha Kasat (89) (Ind-U-23 Green)
- Most wickets: Sushree Dibyadarshini (6) (Ind-U-23 Green)
- Official website: bcci.tv

Women's U23 T20 Challenger Trophy was played from 4 to 8 October 2018 at Mysuru. India Green Under-23 Women defeated India Blue Under-23 Women by 8 wickets in the final to win the tournament.

====== League ======
| Team | P | W | L | T | NR | Pts | NRR |
|---|---|---|---|---|---|---|---|
| India Blue U-23 Women (RU) | 2 | 2 | 0 | 0 | 0 | 8 | +1.667 |
| India Green U-23 Women (C) | 2 | 1 | 1 | 0 | 0 | 4 | −0.407 |
| India Red U-23 Women | 2 | 0 | 2 | 0 | 0 | 0 | −1.038 |

Top two teams advanced to the final

====== Final ======
8 October 2018
Scorecard

| India Blue U-23 Women; 70 (17.4 overs) | v | India Green U-23 Women; 72/2 (12.5 overs) |

India Green U-23 Women won by 8 Wickets
Srikantadatta Narasimha Raja Wadeyar Ground, Mysuru

==== Under-19 ====
The Under-19 age group consisted of One-Day League, T20 League and T20 Challenger Trophy.

===== Women's U19 One-Day League =====
Women's U19 One-Day League
- Dates: 10 February – 11 March 2019
- Cricket format: Women's U-19 One-day
- Champions: Bengal Under-19 Women
- Runners-up: Delhi Under-19 Women
- Participants: 35
- Matches: 143
- Most runs: S K Raut (440) (Mum U-19)
- Most wickets: Tejashwini N Duragad (26) (Goa U-19)
- Official website: bcci.tv

Women's U19 One-Day League was played from 10 February to 11 March 2019. The tournament's qualification structure was similar to Ranji Trophy. Bengal U-19 Women defeated Delhi U-19 Women by 26 runs (by VJD method) to win the tournament.

====== League ======
Points table

Elite Group-A and B

| Team | P | W | L | T | NR | Pts | NRR |
|---|---|---|---|---|---|---|---|
| Bengal | 8 | 7 | 1 | 0 | 0 | 28 | +1.081 |
| Delhi | 8 | 6 | 1 | 0 | 1 | 26 | +1.005 |
| Uttar Pradesh | 8 | 6 | 2 | 0 | 0 | 24 | +0.835 |
| Punjab | 8 | 6 | 2 | 0 | 0 | 24 | +0.412 |
| Mumbai | 8 | 6 | 2 | 0 | 0 | 24 | +1.428 |
| Andhra | 8 | 6 | 2 | 0 | 0 | 24 | +1.158 |
| Madhya Pradesh | 8 | 5 | 3 | 0 | 0 | 20 | +0.602 |
| Haryana | 8 | 5 | 3 | 0 | 0 | 20 | −0.027 |
| Assam | 8 | 4 | 2 | 1 | 1 | 20 | +0.555 |
| Himachal | 8 | 4 | 3 | 1 | 0 | 18 | −0.145 |
| Baroda | 8 | 3 | 5 | 0 | 0 | 12 | +0.053 |
| Rajasthan | 8 | 3 | 5 | 0 | 0 | 12 | −0.920 |
| Kerala | 8 | 3 | 5 | 0 | 0 | 12 | −0.646 |
| Jharkhand | 8 | 2 | 6 | 0 | 0 | 8 | −1.013 |
| Hyderabad | 8 | 2 | 6 | 0 | 0 | 8 | −0.308 |
| Maharashtra | 8 | 1 | 7 | 0 | 0 | 4 | −0.780 |
| Karnataka | 8 | 1 | 7 | 0 | 0 | 4 | −1.088 |
| Chhattisgarh | 8 | 0 | 8 | 0 | 0 | 0 | −2.186 |

Elite Group-C

| Team | P | W | L | T | NR | Pts | NRR |
|---|---|---|---|---|---|---|---|
| Odisha | 7 | 7 | 0 | 0 | 0 | 28 | +1.734 |
| Goa | 7 | 6 | 1 | 0 | 0 | 24 | +1.840 |
| Gujarat | 7 | 5 | 2 | 0 | 0 | 20 | +0.198 |
| Tamil Nadu | 7 | 4 | 3 | 0 | 0 | 16 | +1.465 |
| Saurashtra | 7 | 3 | 4 | 0 | 0 | 12 | −0.928 |
| Vidarbha | 7 | 2 | 5 | 0 | 0 | 8 | −0.258 |
| Tripura | 7 | 1 | 6 | 0 | 0 | 4 | −0.783 |
| Jammu & Kashmir | 7 | 0 | 7 | 0 | 0 | 0 | −3.337 |

Plate

| Team | P | W | L | T | NR | Pts | NRR |
|---|---|---|---|---|---|---|---|
| Uttarakhand | 8 | 7 | 0 | 0 | 1 | 30 | +4.491 |
| Bihar | 8 | 4 | 1 | 0 | 3 | 22 | +1.561 |
| Manipur | 8 | 4 | 1 | 0 | 3 | 22 | −0.912 |
| Nagaland | 8 | 3 | 2 | 0 | 3 | 18 | +0.276 |
| Meghalaya | 8 | 3 | 3 | 0 | 2 | 16 | −0.508 |
| Mizoram | 8 | 2 | 4 | 0 | 2 | 12 | −1.046 |
| Sikkim | 8 | 2 | 4 | 0 | 2 | 12 | −0.953 |
| Arunachal Pradesh | 8 | 0 | 5 | 0 | 3 | 6 | −0.778 |
| Puducherry | 8 | 0 | 5 | 0 | 3 | 6 | −1.475 |

- Top five teams across Groups A and B advanced to the knockout stage. Top two teams from Group C advanced to the knockout stage and are promoted to Groups A and B for the next season. Top team from Group C advanced to the knockout stage and are promoted to Group C for the next season.
- Bottom two teams across Groups A and B relegated to the Group C for the next season. Bottom ranked team in Group-C is relegated to the Plate Group for the next season.

====== Quarter-finals ======
6 March 2019
Scorecard

| Bengal U-19 Women; 224/7 (50 overs) | v | Uttarakhand U-19 Women; 57 (38.4 overs) |

Bengal U-19 Women won by 167 Runs
Abhimanyu Cricket Academy, Dehradun

6 March 2019
Scorecard

| Odisha U-19 Women; 140 (47.3 overs) | v | Uttar Pradesh U-19 Women; 143/7 (36.1 overs) |

Uttar Pradesh U-19 Women won by 3 Wickets
Tanush Academy Ground, Dehradun

7 March 2019
Scorecard

| Goa U-19 Women; 73 (31.3 overs) | v | Delhi U-19 Women; 74/6 (25.3 overs) |

Delhi U-19 Women won by 4 Wickets
Abhimanyu Cricket Academy, Dehradun

7 March 2019
Scorecard

| Punjab U-19 Women; 164/9 (50 overs) | v | Mumbai U-19 Women; 165/5 (49.1 overs) |

Mumbai U-19 Women won by 5 Wickets
Tanush Academy Ground, Dehradun

====== Semi-finals ======
9 March 2019
Scorecard

| Bengal U-19 Women; 150 (49.2 overs) | v | Mumbai U-19 Women; 130 (46.2 overs) |

Bengal U-19 Women won by 20 Runs
Abhimanyu Cricket Academy, Dehradun

9 March 2019
Scorecard

| Delhi U-19 Women; 172/9 (50 overs) | v | Uttar Pradesh U-19 Women; 81 (32.4 overs) |

Delhi U-19 Women won by 91 Runs
Tanush Academy Ground, Dehradun

====== Final ======
11 March 2019
Scorecard

| Bengal U-19 Women; 181 (50 overs) | v | Delhi U-19 Women; 110/5 (38 overs) |

Bengal U-19 Women won by 26 Runs (VJD method)
Abhimanyu Cricket Academy, Dehradun

===== Women's U19 T20 League =====
Women's U19 T20 League
- Dates: 14 October 2018 – 3 November 2018
- Cricket format: Women's U-19 T20
- Champions: Uttar Pradesh U-19 Women
- Runners-up: Andhra U-19 Women
- Participants: 35
- Matches: 126
- Most runs: Shobha Devi (391) (U.P. U-19)
- Most wickets: Anjali Singh (19) (U.P. U-19)
- Official website: bcci.tv

Women's U19 T20 League was played from 14 October to 3 November 2018. Two teams each from 5 groups qualified for the 2-group Super League. Winners of the two groups met in the final. Uttar Pradesh U-19 Women defeated Andhra U-19 Women in the final by 18 runs to win the tournament.

====== League ======
Points table

Group-A

| Team | P | W | L | T | NR | Pts | NRR |
|---|---|---|---|---|---|---|---|
| Punjab | 6 | 4 | 0 | 0 | 2 | 20 | +2.991 |
| Andhra | 6 | 3 | 0 | 0 | 3 | 18 | +7.831 |
| Hyderabad | 6 | 3 | 2 | 0 | 1 | 14 | +3.884 |
| Gujarat | 6 | 3 | 2 | 0 | 1 | 14 | +1.777 |
| Tamil Nadu | 6 | 3 | 3 | 0 | 0 | 12 | +1.230 |
| Sikkim | 6 | 1 | 4 | 0 | 1 | 6 | −5.829 |
| Meghalaya | 6 | 0 | 6 | 0 | 0 | 0 | −6.472 |

Group-B

| Team | P | W | L | T | NR | Pts | NRR |
|---|---|---|---|---|---|---|---|
| Delhi | 6 | 6 | 0 | 0 | 0 | 24 | +3.451 |
| Odisha | 6 | 5 | 1 | 0 | 0 | 20 | +2.685 |
| Mumbai | 6 | 4 | 2 | 0 | 0 | 16 | +2.302 |
| Maharashtra | 6 | 3 | 3 | 0 | 0 | 12 | +1.246 |
| Tripura | 6 | 2 | 4 | 0 | 0 | 8 | +0.027 |
| Manipur | 6 | 1 | 5 | 0 | 0 | 4 | −4.780 |
| Arunachal Pradesh | 6 | 0 | 6 | 0 | 0 | 0 | −5.438 |

Group-C

| Team | P | W | L | T | NR | Pts | NRR |
|---|---|---|---|---|---|---|---|
| Himachal | 6 | 6 | 0 | 0 | 0 | 24 | +1.386 |
| Kerala | 6 | 5 | 1 | 0 | 0 | 20 | +1.900 |
| Goa | 6 | 4 | 2 | 0 | 0 | 16 | +0.640 |
| Haryana | 6 | 3 | 3 | 0 | 0 | 12 | +1.240 |
| Uttarakhand | 6 | 2 | 4 | 0 | 0 | 8 | −0.782 |
| Jharkhand | 6 | 1 | 5 | 0 | 0 | 4 | −0.376 |
| Nagaland | 6 | 0 | 6 | 0 | 0 | 0 | −5.171 |

Group-D

| Team | P | W | L | T | NR | Pts | NRR |
|---|---|---|---|---|---|---|---|
| Bengal | 6 | 6 | 0 | 0 | 0 | 24 | +3.167 |
| Assam | 6 | 4 | 2 | 0 | 0 | 16 | +1.310 |
| Madhya Pradesh | 6 | 4 | 2 | 0 | 0 | 16 | +1.172 |
| Rajasthan | 6 | 4 | 2 | 0 | 0 | 16 | +0.483 |
| Vidarbha | 6 | 2 | 4 | 0 | 0 | 8 | −0.587 |
| Bihar | 6 | 1 | 5 | 0 | 0 | 4 | −0.722 |
| Puducherry | 6 | 0 | 6 | 0 | 0 | 0 | −5.128 |

Group-E

| Team | P | W | L | T | NR | Pts | NRR |
|---|---|---|---|---|---|---|---|
| Uttar Pradesh | 6 | 6 | 0 | 0 | 0 | 24 | +3.926 |
| Baroda | 6 | 5 | 1 | 0 | 0 | 20 | +2.338 |
| Karnataka | 6 | 4 | 2 | 0 | 0 | 16 | +1.328 |
| Chhattisgarh | 6 | 3 | 3 | 0 | 0 | 12 | +0.342 |
| Saurashtra | 6 | 2 | 4 | 0 | 0 | 8 | −1.623 |
| Jammu & Kashmir | 6 | 1 | 5 | 0 | 0 | 4 | −2.201 |
| Mizoram | 6 | 0 | 6 | 0 | 0 | 0 | −4.609 |

- Top 2 teams from each group advanced to the Super League.

====== Super League ======
Points table

Super Group-A

| Team | P | W | L | T | NR | Pts | NRR |
|---|---|---|---|---|---|---|---|
| Uttar Pradesh | 4 | 4 | 0 | 0 | 0 | 16 | +1.598 |
| Assam | 4 | 3 | 1 | 0 | 0 | 12 | −0.106 |
| Punjab | 4 | 2 | 2 | 0 | 0 | 8 | −0.050 |
| Himachal | 4 | 1 | 3 | 0 | 0 | 4 | −0.427 |
| Odisha | 4 | 0 | 4 | 0 | 0 | 0 | −1.004 |

Super Group-B

| Team | P | W | L | T | NR | Pts | NRR |
|---|---|---|---|---|---|---|---|
| Andhra | 4 | 4 | 0 | 0 | 0 | 16 | +1.646 |
| Bengal | 4 | 3 | 1 | 0 | 0 | 12 | +0.338 |
| Delhi | 4 | 1 | 3 | 0 | 0 | 4 | −0.460 |
| Kerala | 4 | 1 | 3 | 0 | 0 | 4 | −0.579 |
| Baroda | 4 | 1 | 3 | 0 | 0 | 4 | −0.930 |

- Top team from both the groups advanced to the final.

====== Final ======
3 November 2018
Scorecard

| Uttar Pradesh U-19 Women; 103/9 (20 overs) | v | Andhra U-19 Women; 85 (20 overs) |

Uttar Pradesh U-19 Women won by 18 Runs
JKC College Cricket Ground, Guntur

===== Women's U19 T20 Challenger Trophy =====
Women's U19 T20 Challenger Trophy
- Dates: 12 – 16 November 2018
- Cricket format: Women's U-19 T20
- Champions: India Red U-19 Women
- Runners-up: India Blue U-19 Women
- Participants: 3
- Matches: 4
- Most runs: Ellutla Padmaja (63) (Ind-U-19 Blue)
- Most wickets: Shafali Verma (4) (Ind-U-19 Green)
- Official website: bcci.tv

Women's U19 T20 Challenger Trophy was played from 12 to 16 November 2018 at Guntur, Andhra Pradesh. India Red Under-19 Women defeated India Blue Under-19 Women by 10 runs in the final to win the tournament.

===== League =====
| Team | P | W | L | T | NR | Pts | NRR |
|---|---|---|---|---|---|---|---|
| India Red U-19 Women (C) | 2 | 1 | 1 | 0 | 0 | 4 | +0.924 |
| India Blue U-19 Women (RU) | 2 | 1 | 1 | 0 | 0 | 4 | −0.100 |
| India Green U-19 Women | 2 | 1 | 1 | 0 | 0 | 4 | −0.783 |

Top two teams advanced to the final

===== Final =====
16 November 2018
Scorecard

| India Blue U-19 Women; 85/6 (20 overs) | v | India Red U-19 Women; 83/7 (17.4 overs) |

India Red U-19 Women won by 10 Runs (VJD method)
ACA Women's Cricket Academy Ground, Guntur
