= Indian cricket team in England in 2018 =

International cricket tour

	England	India
- Dates: 3 July – 11 September 2018
Captains	Joe Root (Tests); Eoin Morgan (ODIs & T20Is)	Virat Kohli

Test series
- Result: England won the 5-match series 4–1
Most runs	Jos Buttler (349)	Virat Kohli (593)
Most wickets	James Anderson (24)	Ishant Sharma (18)
- Player of the series: Sam Curran (Eng); Virat Kohli (Ind)

One Day International series
- Results: England won the 3-match series 2–1
Most runs	Joe Root (216)	Virat Kohli (191)
Most wickets	Adil Rashid (6)	Kuldeep Yadav (9)
- Player of the series: Joe Root (Eng)

Twenty20 International series
- Results: India won the 3-match series 2–1
Most runs	Jos Buttler (117)	Rohit Sharma (137)
Most wickets	David Willey (3)	Hardik Pandya (6)
- Player of the series: Rohit Sharma (Ind)

The India cricket team toured England between July and September 2018 to play five Tests, three One Day International (ODIs) and three Twenty20 International (T20Is) matches. India also played a three-day match against Essex in July at Chelmsford.

India won the T20I series 2–1. In the second T20I, MS Dhoni played in his 500th international cricket match. He became the ninth player overall, and the third Indian, to reach this milestone.

England won the ODI series 2–1, making it their eighth consecutive bilateral ODI series win. It also ended India's run of nine previous bilateral series wins, and was the first such loss under the captaincy of Virat Kohli. In the second ODI match, Dhoni became the twelfth batsman to score 10,000 runs in ODIs.

The first Test of the tour, which started on 1 August at Edgbaston, was the 1,000th to be played by the England team, making them the first team to reach this milestone. Ahead of the fifth Test, England's Alastair Cook announced that he would retire from international cricket following the conclusion of the series. In the second innings of the fifth Test, Cook scored a century, becoming only the fifth batsman to score a century in his first and last Test matches. In the process, he moved up to fifth on the list of all-time leading run-scorers in Test cricket, moving ahead of Kumar Sangakkara. In the same match, James Anderson took his 564th wicket, the most wickets in Tests by a fast bowler, going past Glenn McGrath. England went on to win the Test series 4–1.

== Squads ==
Tests		ODIs		T20Is	
England	India	England	India	England	India
Joe Root (c); Jos Buttler (vc); Moeen Ali; James Anderson; Jonny Bairstow (wk); Stuart Broad; Alastair Cook; Sam Curran; Keaton Jennings; Dawid Malan; Ollie Pope; Jamie Porter; Adil Rashid; Ben Stokes; James Vince; Chris Woakes	Virat Kohli (c); Ajinkya Rahane (vc); Ravichandran Ashwin; Jasprit Bumrah; Shikhar Dhawan; Ravindra Jadeja; Dinesh Karthik (wk); Karun Nair; Hardik Pandya; Rishabh Pant (wk); Cheteshwar Pujara; KL Rahul; Mohammed Shami; Ishant Sharma; Prithvi Shaw; Shardul Thakur; Hanuma Vihari; Murali Vijay; Kuldeep Yadav; Umesh Yadav	Eoin Morgan (c); Moeen Ali; Jonny Bairstow; Jake Ball; Sam Billings; Jos Buttler (wk); Sam Curran; ~~Tom Curran~~; ~~Alex Hales~~; Dawid Malan; Liam Plunkett; Adil Rashid; Joe Root; Jason Roy; Ben Stokes; James Vince; David Willey; Mark Wood	Virat Kohli (c); ~~Jasprit Bumrah~~; Yuzvendra Chahal; Shikhar Dhawan; MS Dhoni (wk); Shreyas Iyer; Dinesh Karthik (wk); Siddarth Kaul; Bhuvneshwar Kumar; Hardik Pandya; Axar Patel; KL Rahul; Suresh Raina; ~~Ambati Rayudu~~; Rohit Sharma; ~~Washington Sundar~~; Shardul Thakur; Kuldeep Yadav; Umesh Yadav	Eoin Morgan (c); Moeen Ali; Jonny Bairstow; Jake Ball; Jos Buttler (wk); Sam Curran; ~~Tom Curran~~; Alex Hales; Chris Jordan; Dawid Malan; Liam Plunkett; Adil Rashid; Joe Root; Jason Roy; Ben Stokes; David Willey	Virat Kohli (c); ~~Jasprit Bumrah~~; Yuzvendra Chahal; Deepak Chahar; Shikhar Dhawan; MS Dhoni (wk); Dinesh Karthik (wk); Siddarth Kaul; Bhuvneshwar Kumar; Manish Pandey; Hardik Pandya; Krunal Pandya; KL Rahul; Suresh Raina; Rohit Sharma; ~~Washington Sundar~~; Kuldeep Yadav; Umesh Yadav

Ahead of the tour, Suresh Raina replaced Ambati Rayudu in India's ODI squad, after Rayudu failed a fitness test. India's Jasprit Bumrah was ruled out for the T20I series due to the fractured left thumb while Washington Sundar was ruled out of both T20I and ODI series due to an ankle injury. Deepak Chahar was named as the replacement for Bumrah while Sundar was replaced by Krunal Pandya for the T20I series and Axar Patel for the ODI series. Bumrah was later ruled out of India's squad for the ODI series, and was replaced by Shardul Thakur.

Initially, Dawid Malan was added to the England squad for the first T20I as cover for Tom Curran, who was eventually ruled out of both limited-over series due to injury, with Sam Curran and Malan named as his replacements in England's ODI and T20I squad respectively. Ben Stokes was added to England's squad for the third T20I. Alex Hales was ruled out of the first ODI with a side injury, with Dawid Malan added to England's squad as cover. Eventually, Hales was ruled out of the ODI series with Malan named as his replacement. Malan was then released ahead of the third ODI to play in the England Lions squad, with James Vince replacing him. Sam Billings was included in England's squad for the third ODI, as cover for Jason Roy.

Wriddhiman Saha, India's usual Test wicket-keeper, had not fully recovered from the thumb injury that he sustained in the 2018 Indian Premier League (IPL) and went on to miss the series. Initially, he was left out of India's squad for the first three Tests along with Bhuvneshwar Kumar, who underwent further fitness assessments after aggravating an injury in the final ODI. On 19 July, Saha was ruled out of the entire tour with a shoulder injury. Kumar was not selected for the final two Tests. Prithvi Shaw and Hanuma Vihari were added to India's squad for the final two Tests, with Murali Vijay and Kuldeep Yadav being dropped.

Ahead of the first Test, Jos Buttler was appointed as vice-captain of the England team for the Test series. Ollie Pope replaced Dawid Malan in the squad for the second Test, with Chris Woakes called up to replace Ben Stokes. Stokes rejoined England's squad for the third Test, replacing Sam Curran, after being found not guilty in a case of affray that took place in September 2017. James Vince was added to England's squad for the fourth Test as cover for Jonny Bairstow. England recalled Moeen Ali and Sam Curran for the fourth Test, replacing Ollie Pope and Chris Woakes. Jos Buttler was also named as the wicket-keeper for the match, after Jonny Bairstow injured a finger during the third Test. Bairstow resumed his role as wicket-keeper for the fifth and final Test of the series.

== T20I series ==
=== 1st T20I ===
3 July 2018
17.30 (D/N)
Scorecard

England; 159/8 (20 overs)	v	India; 163/2 (18.2 overs)
Jos Buttler 69 (46); Kuldeep Yadav 5/24 (4 overs)		KL Rahul 101* (54); Adil Rashid 1/25 (4 overs)

India won by 8 wickets
Old Trafford, Manchester
Umpires: Rob Bailey (Eng) and Alex Wharf (Eng)
Player of the match: Kuldeep Yadav (Ind)

- India won the toss and elected to field.
- Kuldeep Yadav (Ind) took his first five-wicket haul in T20Is.
- Virat Kohli (Ind) became the fastest to score 2,000 runs in terms of innings in T20Is (56).
- KL Rahul (Ind) scored his second century in T20Is.

=== 2nd T20I ===
6 July 2018
17.30 (D/N)
Scorecard

India; 148/5 (20 overs)	v	England; 149/5 (19.4 overs)
Virat Kohli 47 (38); Liam Plunkett 1/17 (4 overs)		Alex Hales 58* (41); Umesh Yadav 2/36 (4 overs)

England won by 5 wickets
Sophia Gardens, Cardiff
Umpires: Michael Gough (Eng) and Tim Robinson (Eng)
Player of the match: Alex Hales (Eng)

- England won the toss and elected to field.
- Jake Ball (Eng) made his T20I debut.
- MS Dhoni (Ind) played in his 500th international match.

=== 3rd T20I ===
8 July 2018
14.00
Scorecard

England; 198/9 (20 overs)	v	India; 201/3 (18.4 overs)
Jason Roy 67 (31); Hardik Pandya 4/38 (4 overs)		Rohit Sharma 100* (56); David Willey 1/37 (3 overs)

India won by 7 wickets
Bristol County Ground, Bristol
Umpires: Rob Bailey (Eng) and Tim Robinson (Eng)
Player of the match: Rohit Sharma (Ind)

- India won the toss and elected to field.
- Deepak Chahar (Ind) made his T20I debut.
- MS Dhoni (Ind) played in his 500th international match, and became the third Indian cricketer to archive this.
- MS Dhoni (Ind) became the first wicket-keeper to take 5 catches in one innings and 50 catches overall in T20Is.
- Rohit Sharma (Ind) became the fifth player overall, and the second Indian, to score 2,000 runs in T20Is. He also became the second batsman to score three centuries in T20Is.
- This was the highest successful run chase against England in a T20I.
- Suresh Raina played his last T20I.

== ODI series ==
=== 1st ODI ===
12 July 2018
12:30
Scorecard

England; 268 (49.5 overs)	v	India; 269/2 (40.1 overs)
Jos Buttler 53 (51); Kuldeep Yadav 6/25 (10 overs)		Rohit Sharma 137* (114); Moeen Ali 1/60 (8.1 overs)

India won by 8 wickets
Trent Bridge, Nottingham
Umpires: Ruchira Palliyaguruge (SL) and Tim Robinson (Eng)
Player of the match: Kuldeep Yadav (Ind)

- India won the toss and elected to field.
- Siddarth Kaul (Ind) made his ODI debut.
- Kuldeep Yadav (Ind) took his first five-wicket haul in ODIs.

=== 2nd ODI ===
14 July 2018
11:00
Scorecard

England; 322/7 (50 overs)	v	India; 236 (50 overs)
Joe Root 113* (116); Kuldeep Yadav 3/68 (10 overs)		Suresh Raina 46 (63); Liam Plunkett 4/46 (10 overs)

England won by 86 runs
Lord's, London
Umpires: Bruce Oxenford (Aus) and Alex Wharf (Eng)
Player of the match: Joe Root (Eng)

- England won the toss and elected to bat.
- MS Dhoni became the fourth wicket-keeper to take 300 catches in ODIs and the 12th batsman to score 10,000 runs in ODIs.

=== 3rd ODI ===
17 July 2018
12:30
Scorecard

India; 256/8 (50 overs)	v	England; 260/2 (44.3 overs)
Virat Kohli 71 (72); David Willey 3/40 (9 overs)		Joe Root 100* (120); Shardul Thakur 1/51 (10 overs)

England won by 8 wickets
Headingley, Leeds
Umpires: Michael Gough (Eng) and Bruce Oxenford (Aus)
Player of the match: Adil Rashid (Eng)

- England won the toss and elected to field.
- Joe Root scored his 13th century in ODIs, a new record for England.
- Virat Kohli (Ind) became the quickest, in terms of innings, to reach 3,000 runs as captain in ODIs (49).
- Suresh Raina played his last ODI.

== Tour match ==
=== Three-day match: Essex vs India ===
25–27 July 2018
Scorecard

India	v	Essex
395 (100.2 overs); Dinesh Karthik 82 (95); Paul Walter 4/113 (21 overs)		359/8d (94 overs); Paul Walter 75 (123); Umesh Yadav 4/35 (18 overs)
89/2 (21.2 overs); KL Rahul 36* (64); Matt Quinn 1/5 (4 overs)

Match drawn
County Cricket Ground, Chelmsford
Umpires: Nick Cook (Eng) and Rob White (Eng)

- India won the toss and elected to bat.
- Originally the match was scheduled to be a four-day game, but was reduced to three days because of the heat wave in the British Isles.

== Test series ==
=== 1st Test ===
1–5 August 2018 (Note: While five days of play were scheduled for each Test, the first, second and fourth Tests reached a result in four days.)
Scorecard

England	v	India
287 (89.4 overs); Joe Root 80 (156); Ravichandran Ashwin 4/62 (26 overs)		274 (76 overs); Virat Kohli 149 (225); Sam Curran 4/74 (17 overs)
180 (53 overs); Sam Curran 63 (65); Ishant Sharma 5/51 (13 overs)		162 (54.2 overs); Virat Kohli 51 (93); Ben Stokes 4/40 (14.2 overs)

England won by 31 runs
Edgbaston, Birmingham
Umpires: Aleem Dar (Pak) and Chris Gaffaney (NZ)
Player of the match: Sam Curran (Eng)

- England won the toss and elected to bat.
- This was England's 1,000th Test match.
- Joe Root (Eng) became the fastest batsman, in terms of time since his debut, to score 6,000 runs in Tests (5 years, 231 days).
- Ben Stokes (Eng) took his 100th wicket in Tests.

=== 2nd Test ===
9–13 August 2018
Scorecard

India	v	England
107 (35.2 overs); Ravichandran Ashwin 29 (38); James Anderson 5/20 (13.2 overs)		396/7d (88.1 overs); Chris Woakes 137* (177); Hardik Pandya 3/66 (17.1 overs)
130 (47 overs); Ravichandran Ashwin 33* (48); James Anderson 4/23 (12 overs)

England won by an innings and 159 runs
Lord's, London
Umpires: Aleem Dar (Pak) and Marais Erasmus (SA)
Player of the match: Chris Woakes (Eng)

- England won the toss and elected to field.
- No play was possible on day 1 due to rain.
- Only 35.2 overs of play was possible on day 2 due to rain and play ended early on day 3 due to bad light.
- Ollie Pope (Eng) made his Test debut.
- Marais Erasmus (SA) officiated in his 50th Test as an on-field umpire.
- Chris Woakes (Eng) scored his first century, and his 1,000th run, in Tests.
- James Anderson (Eng) took his 100th wicket at Lord's in Tests. He also took his 550th wicket in Tests.

=== 3rd Test ===
18–22 August 2018
Scorecard

India	v	England
329 (94.5 overs); Virat Kohli 97 (152); James Anderson 3/64 (25.5 overs)		161 (38.2 overs); Jos Buttler 39 (32); Hardik Pandya 5/28 (6 overs)
352/7d (110 overs); Virat Kohli 103 (197); Adil Rashid 3/101 (27 overs)		317 (104.5 overs); Jos Buttler 106 (176); Jasprit Bumrah 5/85 (29 overs)

India won by 203 runs
Trent Bridge, Nottingham
Umpires: Marais Erasmus (SA) and Chris Gaffaney (NZ)
Player of the match: Virat Kohli (Ind)

- England won the toss and elected to field.
- Rishabh Pant (Ind) made his Test debut.
- Ajinkya Rahane (Ind) scored his 3,000th run in Tests.
- James Anderson (Eng) took his 100th wicket against India in Tests.
- Hardik Pandya (Ind) took his maiden five-wicket haul in Tests.
- Jos Buttler (Eng) scored his 1,000th run and his maiden century in Tests.
- Stuart Broad (Eng) became the fifth player to score 3,000 runs and take 400 wickets in Tests.

=== 4th Test ===
30 August–3 September 2018
Scorecard

England	v	India
246 (76.4 overs); Sam Curran 78 (136); Jasprit Bumrah 3/46 (20 overs)		273 (84.5 overs); Cheteshwar Pujara 132* (257); Moeen Ali 5/63 (16 overs)
271 (96.1 overs); Jos Buttler 69 (122); Mohammed Shami 4/57 (16 overs)		184 (69.4 overs); Virat Kohli 58 (130); Moeen Ali 4/71 (26 overs)

England won by 60 runs
Rose Bowl, Southampton
Umpires: Kumar Dharmasena (SL) and Bruce Oxenford (Aus)
Player of the match: Moeen Ali (Eng)

- England won the toss and elected to bat.
- Bruce Oxenford (Aus) officiated in his 50th Test as an on-field umpire.
- Ishant Sharma became the seventh bowler for India to take 250 wickets in Tests and 50 wickets against England in Tests.
- Virat Kohli (Ind) scored his 6,000th run in Tests.

=== 5th Test ===
7–11 September 2018
Scorecard

England	v	India
332 (122 overs); Jos Buttler 89 (133); Ravindra Jadeja 4/79 (30 overs)		292 (95 overs); Ravindra Jadeja 86* (156); Moeen Ali 2/50 (17 overs)
423/8d (112.3 overs); Alastair Cook 147 (286); Hanuma Vihari 3/37 (9.3 overs)		345 (94.3 overs); KL Rahul 149 (224); James Anderson 3/45 (22.3 overs)

England won by 118 runs
The Oval, London
Umpires: Kumar Dharmasena (SL) and Joel Wilson (WI)
Player of the match: Alastair Cook (Eng)

- England won the toss and elected to bat.
- Hanuma Vihari (Ind) made his Test debut.
- Alastair Cook (Eng) played in his last Test.
- Ajinkya Rahane (Ind) played in his 50th Test.
- Rishabh Pant (Ind) scored his maiden century in Tests, becoming the first Indian wicket-keeper to score a century in Tests in England.
- James Anderson (Eng) overtook Glenn McGrath as the leading wicket-taker as a fast bowler. He would go on to take 704 wickets in his career, the third most by any cricketer in history.
