= Jamie Porter =

English cricketer

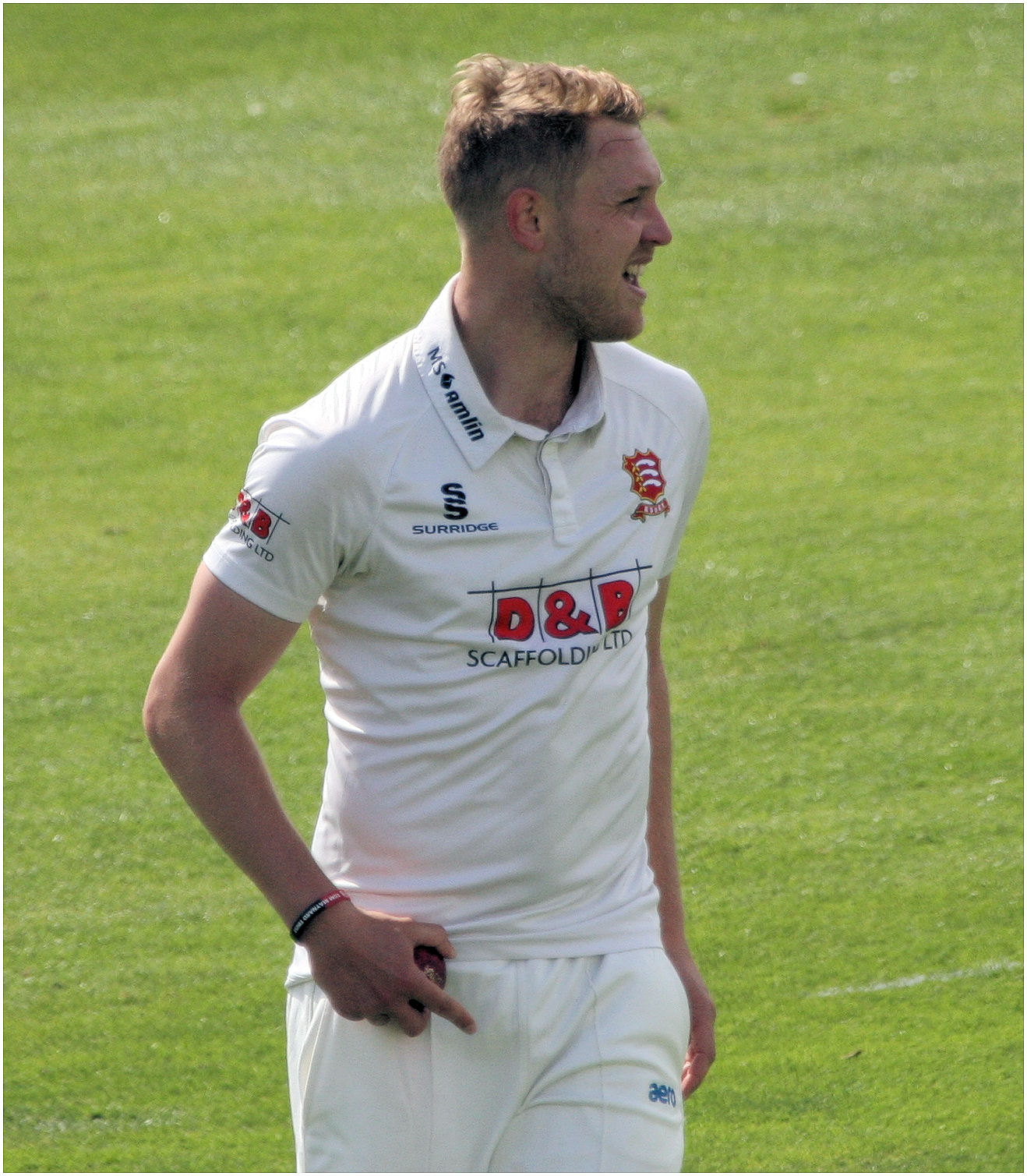
- Porter in 2017

Personal information
- Full name: James Alexander Porter
- Born: 25 May 1993 (age 33); Leytonstone, London, England
- Batting: Right-handed
- Bowling: Right-arm medium-fast
- Role: Bowler

Domestic team information
- Years: Team
- 2014–present: Essex (squad no. 44)
- First-class debut: 9 September 2014 Essex v Kent
- List A debut: 4 August 2014 Essex v Hampshire

Career statistics
Competition	FC	LA	T20
Matches	162	56	25
Runs scored	660	74	5
Batting average	6.28	7.40	5.00
100s/50s	0/1	0/0	0/0
Top score	52	12	1*
Balls bowled	26,780	2,616	421
Wickets	602	61	19
Bowling average	23.39	34.18	33.47
5 wickets in innings	23	0	0
10 wickets in match	3	0	0
Best bowling	7/41	4/29	4/20
Catches/stumpings	51/–	9/–	6/–
- Source: ESPNcricinfo, 27 September 2026

James Alexander Porter (born 25 May 1993) is an English cricketer who has played first-class cricket for Essex since 2014. He is a righthanded batsman who bowls right arm medium-fast pace.

== Career ==
In the 2011–12 season, Porter attended the Darren Lehmann Cricket Academy and played club cricket for the West Torrens District Cricket Club in Adelaide. In 2013, Porter was included in the Marylebone Cricket Club (MCC) Young Cricketers squad – he was already a member of the Essex Second XI. At the time, he was a part-time cricketer, and also worked as a recruitment consultant. He played club cricket for Fives & Heronians club in Chigwell, before moving to Chingford cricket club, taking 33 wickets at an average of 13 in the 2014 season, as Chingford took their maiden Essex Premier League title. He made his senior Essex debut in September 2014, taking the wicket of Darren Stevens with his fifth delivery in first-class cricket. He also became the first player to represent a county team and Chingford since Robin Hobbs in 1961. At the end of the 2014 season, Porter signed a new Essex contract until 2016.

He played his first full season for Essex in the 2015 season, taking 38 wickets in the first 10 County Championship matches. Essex head coach Paul Grayson called Porter refreshing, and said that "He's a good character and he's a very good bowler. He's lively medium, he does something with the ball and he asks lots of questions of batsmen." In a tour match against an Australian team, Porter took 3 wickets in the second innings, dismissing David Warner, Peter Siddle and Nathan Lyon; before the match, Porter had stated that he wanted to dismiss Warner.

He made his Twenty20 debut for Essex in the 2017 NatWest t20 Blast on 7 July 2017.

In April 2018 he was named one of the five Wisden Cricketers of the Year for his contribution to the Essex team that won the 2017 County Championship

In July 2018, he was named in England's Test squad for the first Test against India, but he was not selected for the match.

== Honours ==
- County Championship: 2017, 2019
