= Zak Chappell =

English cricketer (born 1996)

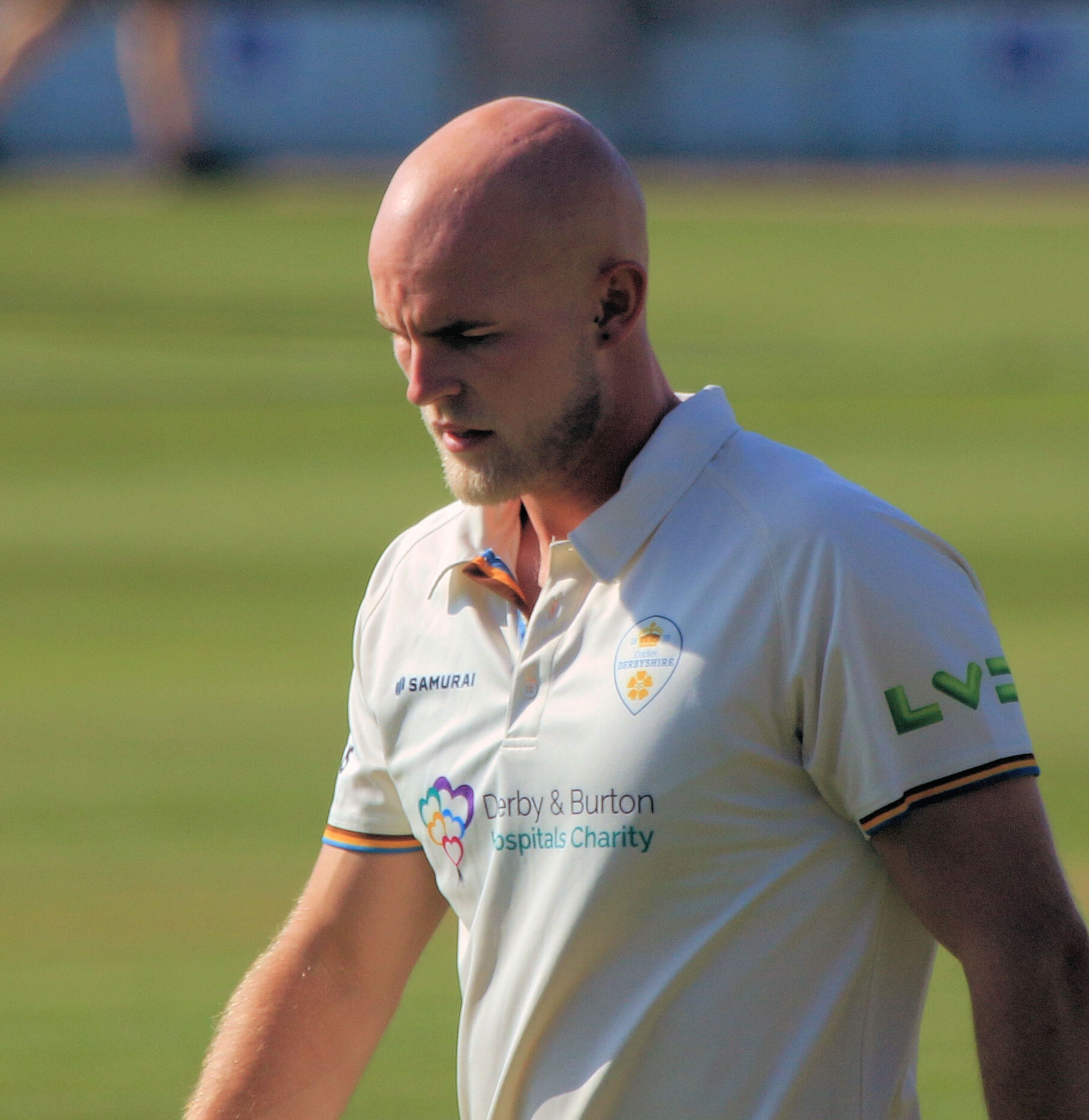
- Chappell in 2023

Personal information
- Full name: Zachariah John Chappell
- Born: 21 August 1996 (age 30); Grantham, Lincolnshire, England
- Height: 1.98 m (6 ft 6 in)
- Batting: Right-handed
- Bowling: Right-arm fast-medium
- Role: Bowler

Domestic team information
- Years: Team
- 2015–2018: Leicestershire (squad no. 32)
- 2019–2022: Nottinghamshire (squad no. 32)
- 2019: → Gloucestershire (on loan)
- 2022: → Gloucestershire (on loan)
- 2023–present: Derbyshire (squad no. 32)
- 2023: Oval Invincibles
- 2024/25: Rangpur Riders
- FC debut: 22 September 2015 Leics v Derbyshire
- LA debut: 17 August 2015 Leics v Worcestershire

Career statistics
Competition	FC	LA	T20
Matches	71	37	68
Runs scored	1,791	509	273
Batting average	20.82	26.78	15.16
100s/50s	0/7	0/2	0/0
Top score	96	94*	34*
Balls bowled	10,247	1,809	1,298
Wickets	171	57	93
Bowling average	35.58	32.03	22.04
5 wickets in innings	4	0	1
10 wickets in match	0	0	0
Best bowling	6/44	4/39	5/23
Catches/stumpings	17/–	7/–	15/–
- Source: CricInfo, 13 May 2026

Zachariah John Chappell (born 21 August 1996) is an English cricketer who plays for Derbyshire after joining them in 2022 from Nottinghamshire. He is a right-arm fast-medium bowler who also bats right-handed. He made his Twenty20 debut for Leicestershire against Northamptonshire in July 2015.
