= Hanuma Vihari =

Indian cricketer

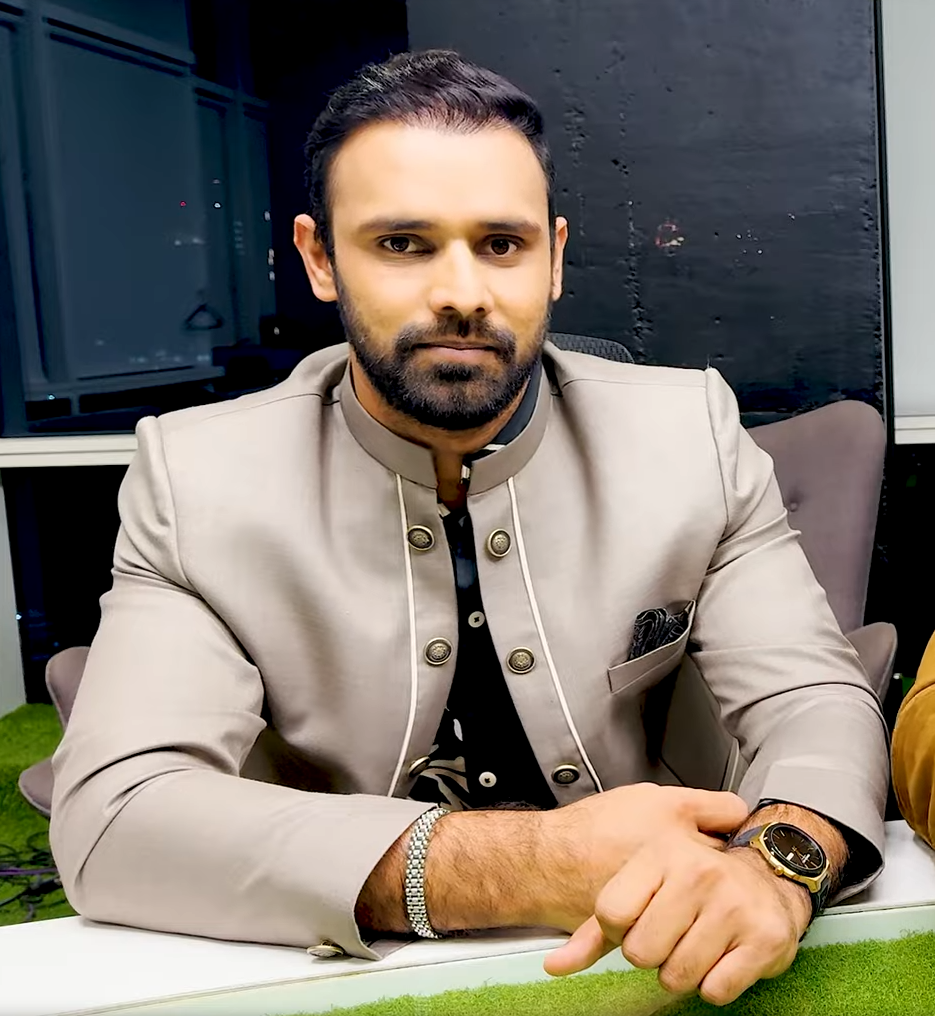

Personal information
- Full name: Gade Hanuma Vihari
- Born: 13 October 1993 (age 33); Kakinada, Andhra Pradesh, India
- Height: 5 ft 11 in (1.80 m)
- Batting: Right-handed
- Bowling: Right-arm off-break
- Role: Batting all-rounder

International information
- National side: India (2018–2022)
- Test debut (cap 292): 8 September 2018 v England
- Last Test: 1 July 2022 v England

Domestic team information
- Years: Team
- 2009/10–2015/16: Hyderabad
- 2013–2015: Sunrisers Hyderabad (squad no. 36)
- 2016/17–2020/21: Andhra
- 2019: Delhi Capitals (squad no. 19)
- 2021: Warwickshire
- 2021/22: Hyderabad
- 2022/23–2023/24: Andhra
- 2025–present: Tripura

Career statistics
Competition	Test	FC	LA	T20
Matches	16	131	97	89
Runs scored	839	9,585	3,506	1,707
Batting average	33.56	49.92	41.73	21.88
100s/50s	1/5	24/51	5/24	0/7
Top score	111	302*	169	81
Balls bowled	345	2,258	1,130	486
Wickets	5	27	22	27
Bowling average	36.00	44.33	41.47	22.51
5 wickets in innings	0	0	0	0
10 wickets in match	0	0	0	0
Best bowling	3/37	3/17	3/31	3/21
Catches/stumpings	4/0	121/1	35/0	34/2
Medal record
Men's cricket
Representing India
ICC World Test Championship
Runner-up	2019-2021
- Source: ESPNcricinfo, 26 August 2025

Gade Hanuma Vihari (born 13 October 1993) is an Indian international cricketer who has played for the Indian cricket team. He currently plays for Tripura in the Ranji Trophy.

== Domestic career ==
Vihari played for Sunrisers Hyderabad in the sixth edition of the Indian Premier League in 2013. In one of the league matches against Royal Challengers Bangalore in Hyderabad, Vihari opened the bowling as an off-spinner and removed Chris Gayle for just 1. He also scored an unbeaten 46 in the same match while chasing. Sunrisers went on to win this match through a super-over.

Vihari was responsible for one-third of Hyderabad's total in the innings against Andhra in 2013/14 Ranji Trophy opener at Rajiv Gandhi International Stadium. He scored 75 in the first innings before being dismissed by CV Stephen, and then scored unbeaten 68 runs.

In October 2017, Vihari scored his first triple century, making 302 not out for Andhra against Odisha in the 2017–18 Ranji Trophy. He was the leading run-scorer for Andhra in the 2017–18 Ranji Trophy, with 752 runs in six matches.

In October 2018, Vihari was named in India B's squad for the 2018–19 Deodhar Trophy. In December 2018, he was bought by the Delhi Capitals in the player auction for the 2019 Indian Premier League. In October 2019, he was named as the captain of India A for the 2019–20 Deodhar Trophy. He was released by the Delhi Capitals ahead of the 2020 IPL auction.

In April 2021, Vihari was signed by Warwickshire County Cricket Club for their 2021 season of the County Championship.

Vihari led Andhra to the knockout stage in the 2022–23 season of the Ranji Trophy. In the quarter-final against Madhya Pradesh, he batted left-handed after injuring his left forearm, returning to bat after his team was reduced to 353/9 after being 328/4 at one stage during their first innings. In their second innings, he batted left-handed for the entirety of his short innings, making 15 runs. Vihari finished with 490 runs at 35 that season. After the first game of the following season, a draw against Bengal, he stepped down as Andhra captain. After a successive quarter-final exit following a loss against the same opponent, Vihari alleged political interference behind his removal of captaincy and vowed to "never play for Andhra" again. The Andhra Cricket Association (ACA) responded saying there were questions around Vihari's captaincy stint in that he "personally verbally abused a specific player during the Bengal Ranji game in front of everyone" and that the "affected player filed an official complaint with the ACA." It also cited "Vihari's status as an India prospect affecting his season-long availability" as the reason for his removal. Vihari ended the season with 522 runs, the second-highest for Andhra after his replacement as captain, Ricky Bhui's tally of 902. Hanuma Vihari Transfers to Tripura (Domestic Cricket, India)

== International career ==
In August 2018, Vihari was called up to India's Test squad for the final two Tests against England. He made his Test debut against England on 7 September 2018, in the 5th Test match of India tour of England 2018, and scored his maiden half-century (56 off 124 balls) in the first innings. In that match, he also became the final bowler in test cricket to dismiss England's highest ever test run scorer Alastair Cook . In December 2018, he was called for 2018–19 Border-Gavaskar trophy and opened the innings in 3rd Test match for India with debutant Mayank Agarwal. He had a decent tour as India won the series 2–1.

On 25 August 2019, against the West Indies, Vihari made 93 runs off 128 balls in the 2nd innings of the 1st Test match, which was labelled as a crucial knock for India as they gave the Windies a target of 419 runs with only 1 day remaining of the Test match. In the second Test match against the West Indies, Vihari scored his maiden Test century. In October 2019, he was selected for India's 3 match Test series against South Africa in India and played only in the 1st Test and this was his first international match in India. In February 2020, he was called for India's 2 Match Test series against New Zealand in New Zealand and scored a half century in the 1st innings of the 2nd Test. He outplayed the fiery Australian attack in the 2020–2021 Border-Gavaskar Trophy in the third Test at Sydney with an unbeaten 23 playing 161 balls and ensured India a draw. While batting in the 4th innings and last day of the match, he suffered a hamstring injury just before the tea. But, he continued to play and along with Ravichandran Ashwin, saved the match for India.
