= India A cricket team and West Indies A cricket team in England in 2018 =

Cricket tournament

2018 England 'A' Tri-Nation Series
- Date: 17 June 2018- 2 July 2018
- Location: England
- Result: India A won the tri series
Teams
| India A | (Cricket West Indies) West Indies A | England Lions |
Captains
| Shreyas Iyer | Jason Mohammed (Note: Devon Thomas captained West Indies A for the fifth and sixth matches.) | Steven Mullaney |
Most runs
| Mayank Agarwal (287) | Chandrapaul Hemraj (133) | Sam Hain (356) |
Most wickets
| Deepak Chahar (10) | Chemar Holder (5) | Liam Dawson (14) |

The India A cricket team and the West Indies A cricket team played a List-A Tri-series and first-class matches in England between June and July 2018. Prior to Tri Series India A and West Indies A played warm up matches against County Clubs. India A won the tri series.

== Squads ==
| India A | West Indies A (Cricket West Indies) | England Lions |
|---|---|---|
| Shreyas Iyer (c); Prithvi Shaw; Mayank Agarwal; Shubman Gill; Hanuma Vihari; ~~Sanju Samson~~; Ishan Kishan; Deepak Hooda; Rishabh Pant; Vijay Shankar; Krishnappa Gowtham; Axar Patel; Krunal Pandya; Prasidh Krishna; Deepak Chahar; Khaleel Ahmed; Shardul Thakur | Jason Mohammed (c); Sunil Ambris; Jermaine Blackwood; Rahkeem Cornwall; Dominic Drakes; Chandrapaul Hemraj; Chemar Holder; Sherman Lewis; Andre McCarthy; Keemo Paul; Rovman Powell; Raymon Reifer; Devon Thomas; Oshane Thomas; Jomel Warrican | Steven Mullaney (c); Ed Barnard; Nick Gubbins; Tom Kohler-Cadmore; Sam Hain; Liam Livingstone; Ben Foakes; Liam Dawson; ~~Sam Curran~~; Craig Overton; Chris Jordan; Matt Parkinson; Matthew Fisher; Reece Topley; Tom Helm |

Ishan Kishan replaced Sanju Samson for the tri-series as Sanju Samson failed a fitness test conducted by BCCI. Sam Curran and Craig Overton were selected for final two ODIs against Australia.Curran was ruled out for whole series. Overton was replaced by Chris Jordan for first two matches in England Lions's squad.

== Warm-up matches ==
=== 1st List A warm-up match: England Cricket Board XI vs India A ===
17 June 2018
11:00
Scorecard

| India A 328/8 (50 overs) | v | ECBXI; 203 (36.5 overs) |
| Prithvi Shaw 70 (61); Ryan Higgins 4/50 (10 overs) | | Matt Critchley 40 (48); Deepak Chahar 3/48 (7.5 overs) |

India A won by 125 runs
Headingley Cricket Ground, Leeds
Umpires: Tom Lungley (Eng) and Ian Blackwell (Eng)

- England Cricket Board XI won the toss and elected to field.

=== 2nd List A warm-up match: Warwickshire vs West Indies A ===
17 June 2018
11:00
Scorecard

| Warwickshire; 385/6 (50 overs) | v | (Cricket West Indies) West Indies A 254 (40.3 overs) |
| Dominic Sibley 115 (103); Dominic Drakes 2/74 (7 overs) | | Jason Mohammed 102 (93); Daniel Douthwaite 3/43 (10 overs) |

Warwickshire won by 131 runs
Edgbaston Cricket Ground, Birmingham
Umpires: Ian Ramage (Sco) and Michael Gough (Eng)

- West Indies A won the toss and elected to field.
- Daniel Douthwaite, George Panayi, Andrew Umeed, Alex Thomson (War) all made their List-A debuts.

=== 3rd List A warm-up match: Leicestershire vs India A ===
19 June 2018
11:00
Scorecard

| India A 458/4 (50 overs) | v | Leicestershire; 177 (40.4 overs) |
| Mayank Agarwal 151* (106); Ateeq Javid 2/91 (10 overs) | | Tom Wells 62 (93); Deepak Chahar 3/24 (6.4 overs) |

India A won by 281 runs
Grace Road, Leicestershire
Umpires: Paul Pollard (Eng) and Graham Lloyd (Eng)

- India A won the toss and elected to bat.
- Donald Butchart, Sam Evans, Harry Funnell, Ben Mike and James Dickinson (Liecs) all made their List-A debuts.
- India A registered their 2nd highest List-A score.

=== 4th List A warm-up match: Worcestershire vs West Indies A ===
19 June 2018
11:00
Scorecard

| West Indies A (Cricket West Indies); 338/9 (50 overs) | v | Worcestershire; 317/8 (50 overs) |
| Jason Mohammed 142 (120); Dillon Pennington 5/67 (9 overs) | | George Rhodes 95 (98); Chemar Holder 3/42 (10 overs) |

West Indies A won by 21 runs
New Road, Worcester
Umpires: Peter Hartley (Eng) and Ben Debenham (Eng)

- West Indies A won the toss and elected to bat.
- Joshua Dell, Alex Milton, Jack Haynes, Mitchell Spencer, Olly Westbury, Ben Towhig and Zain-ul-Hassan (Worcs) all made their List-A debuts.

== Tri-series ==
=== Points table ===
| Pos | Team | Pld | W | L | T | NR | BP | Pts | NRR |
|---|---|---|---|---|---|---|---|---|---|
| 1 | India A | 4 | 3 | 1 | 0 | 0 | 0 | 6 | 1.688 |
| 2 | England Lions | 4 | 3 | 1 | 0 | 0 | 0 | 6 | 0.868 |
| 3 | (Cricket West Indies) West Indies A | 4 | 0 | 4 | 0 | 0 | 0 | 0 | −2.653 |

=== Matches ===
22 June 2018
11:00
Scorecard

| India A 232 (46.3 overs) | v | England Lions; 236/3 (41.5 overs) |
| Rishabh Pant 64 (55); Liam Dawson 4/30 (10 overs) | | Nick Gubbins 128* (132); Shardul Thakur 2/30 (7 overs) |

England Lions won by 7 wickets
County Ground, Derby
Umpires: David Millns (Eng) and Ian Ramage (Sco)

- India A won the toss and elected to bat.

23 June 2018
11:00
Scorecard

| England Lions; 318/5 (50 overs) | v | (Cricket West Indies) West Indies A 231 (44.4 overs) |
| Sam Hain 145 (134); Jomel Warrican 1/46 (10 overs) | | Rovman Powell 55 (50); Liam Dawson 4/27 (10 overs) |

England Lions won by 87 runs
County Ground, Derby
Umpires: David Millns (Eng) and Ian Ramage (Sco)

- England Lions won the toss and elected to bat.

25 June 2018
11:00
Scorecard

| West Indies A (Cricket West Indies); 221 (49.1 overs) | v | India A 222/3 (38.1 overs) |
| Devon Thomas 64 (83); Deepak Chahar 5/27 (10 overs) | | Mayank Agarwal 112 (102); Dominic Drakes 2/37 (7.1 overs) |

India A won by 7 wickets
Grace Road, Leicester
Umpires: James Middlebrook (Eng) and Tim Robinson (Eng)

- West Indies A won the toss and elected to bat.

26 June 2018
11:00
Scorecard

| India A 309/6 (50 overs) | v | England Lions; 207 (41.3 overs) |
| Mayank Agarwal 112 (104); Ed Barnard 2/51 (10 overs) | | Liam Dawson 38 (40); Shardul Thakur 3/53 (8 overs) |

India A won by 102 runs
Grace Road, Leicester
Umpires: Neil Bainton (Eng) and Rob White (Eng)

- India A won the toss and elected to bat.

28 June 2018
11:00
Scorecard

| West Indies A (Cricket West Indies); 162 (44.3 overs) | v | England Lions; 163/1 (25 overs) |
| Devon Thomas 45 (67); Reece Topley 4/16 (7.3 overs) | | Tom Kohler-Cadmore 80* (70) |

England Lions won by 9 wickets
County Cricket Ground, Northampton
Umpires: Jeff Evans (Eng) and Tom Lungley (Eng)

- England Lions won the toss and elected to field.
- Sherman Lewis (WI A) made his List-A debut.

29 June 2018
11:00
Scorecard

| India A 354/6 (50 overs) | v | (Cricket West Indies) West Indies A 151 (37.4 overs) |
| Hanuma Vihari 147 (131); Chemar Holder 3/70 (10 overs) | | Chandrapaul Hemraj 43 (46); Axar Patel 4/34 (9.4 overs) |

India A won by 203 runs
County Cricket Ground, Northampton
Umpires: Ian Blackwell (Eng) and Tim Robinson (Eng)

- India A won the toss and elected to bat.

Final

2 July 2018
11:00
Scorecard

| England Lions; 264/9 (50 overs) | v | India A 267/5 (48.2 overs) |
| Sam Hain 108 (122); Khaleel Ahmed 3/48 (10 overs) | | Rishabh Pant 64* (62); Liam Dawson 2/37 (9 overs) |

India A won by 5 wickets
The Oval, London
Umpires: Neil Mallender (Eng) and Graham Lloyd (Eng)

- India A won the toss and elected to field.
- India A won the Tri-Series.

== India A vs West Indies A unofficial Test series ==
India A vs West Indies A in England in 2018
| | India A | West Indies A |
- Dates: 4 – 13 July 2018
| Captains | Karun Nair | Shamarh Brooks |

Test series
- Result: India A won the 2-match series 1–0
| Most runs | Karun Nair (210) | Shamarh Brooks (224) |
| Most wickets | Sherman Lewis (8) | Ankit Rajpoot (5) |
- Player of the series: Prithvi Shaw (India A)

=== Squads ===
| India A | West Indies A (Cricket West Indies) |
|---|---|
| Karun Nair (c); Ravikumar Samarth; Mayank Agarwal; Abhimanyu Easwaran; Prithvi Shaw; Hanuma Vihari; Ankit Bawne; Vijay Shankar; Srikar Bharat; Jayant Yadav; Shahbaz Nadeem; Ankit Rajpoot; Mohammed Siraj; Navdeep Saini; Rajneesh Gurbani; Rishabh Pant | Shamarh Brooks (c); Jason Mohammed; Sunil Ambris; Jermaine Blackwood; Rahkeem Cornwall; Dominic Drakes; Chandrapaul Hemraj; Chemar Holder; Sherman Lewis; Andre McCarthy; Keemo Paul; Rovman Powell; Raymon Reifer; Devon Thomas; Oshane Thomas; Jomel Warrican; John Campbell |

Rishabh Pant was not selected initially but was added later to the India A squad.

=== Unofficial Test series ===
==== 1st unofficial Test ====
4–7 July 2018
Scorecard

| India A | v | (Cricket West Indies) West Indies A |
| 133 (42.1 overs); Hanuma Vihari 37 (107); Sherman Lewis 4/35 (11.1 overs) | | 383 (101.2 overs); Sunil Ambris 128 (165); Ankit Rajpoot 4/76 (25.2 overs) |
| 609/6d (111 overs); Prithvi Shaw 188 (169); Sherman Lewis 2/130 (24 overs) | | 245/7 (76 overs); Jermaine Blackwood 61 (95); Navdeep Saini 2/41 (14 overs) |

Match drawn
Kent County Cricket Ground, Beckenham
Umpires: Neil Mallender (Eng) and Rob White (Eng)
Player of the match: Prithvi Shaw (India A)

- India A won the toss and elected to bat.

==== 2nd unofficial Test ====
10–13 July 2018
Scorecard

| West Indies A (Cricket West Indies) | v | India A |
| 302 (90.5 overs); Shamarh Brooks 122* (228); Mohammed Siraj 4/68 (22.5 overs) | | 192 (48 overs); Ankit Bawne 43* (92); Raymon Reifer 5/50 (16 overs) |
| 210 (57.3 overs); Jermaine Blackwood 67 (84); Mohammed Siraj 4/64 (20 overs) | | 321/5 (67.1 overs); Hanuma Vihari 68 (139); Jomel Warrican 1/36 (9 overs) |

India A won by 5 wickets
The Cooper Associates County Ground, Taunton
Umpires: Neil Bainton (Eng) and Mark Newell (Eng)
Player of the match: Hanuma Vihari (India A)

- West Indies A won the toss and elected to bat.
- India A won the first-class series by 1-0.

== India A vs England Lions unofficial Test series ==
India A in England in 2018
| | India A | England Lions |
- Dates: 16 – 19 July 2018
| Captains | Karun Nair | Rory Burns |

Test series
- Result: England Lions won the 1-match series 1–0
| Most runs | Rishabh Pant (119) | Alastair Cook (185) |
| Most wickets | Mohammed Siraj (7) | Sam Curran (7) |
- Player of the series: Alastair Cook (England Lions)

=== Squads ===
| India A | England Lions |
|---|---|
| Karun Nair (c); Ravikumar Samarth; Mayank Agarwal; Abhimanyu Easwaran; Prithvi Shaw; Hanuma Vihari; Ankit Bawne; Vijay Shankar; Srikar Bharat; Jayant Yadav; Shahbaz Nadeem; Ankit Rajpoot; Mohammed Siraj; Navdeep Saini; Rajneesh Gurbani; Rishabh Pant; Murali Vijay; Ajinkya Rahane | Rory Burns (c); Alastair Cook; Nick Gubbins; Dawid Malan; Ollie Pope; Chris Woakes; Sam Curran; Dominic Bess; Matthew Fisher; Jack Leach; Jamie Porter |

=== Only unofficial Test ===
16–19 July 2018
Scorecard

| England Lions | v | India A |
| 423 (128.5 overs); Alastair Cook 180 (268); Mohammed Siraj 4/79 (29 overs) | | 197 (66.5 overs); Prithvi Shaw 62 (82); Sam Curran 5/43 (11.5 overs) |
| 194/5d (52 overs); Dawid Malan 56 (93); Mohammed Siraj 3/55 (14 overs) | | 167 (44 overs); Rishabh Pant 61 (71); Sam Curran 2/17 (7 overs) |

England Lions won by 253 runs
New Road, Worcester
Umpires: Ian Blackwell (Eng) and James Middlebrook (Eng)
Player of the match: Alastair Cook (England Lions)

- England Lions won the toss and elected to bat.
- England Lions won the one-off first-class match by 1-0.

== West Indies A vs Surrey tour match ==
West Indies A in England in 2018
| | West Indies A | Surrey |
- Dates: 16 – 19 July 2018
| Captains | Shamarh Brooks | Tom Curran |

Test series
- Result: 1-match series drawn 0–0
| Most runs | Sunil Ambris (75) | Scott Borthwick (175) |
| Most wickets | Chemar Holder (3); Odean Smith (3) | Morne Morkel (4) |
- Player of the series: Scott Borthwick (Surrey)

=== Squads ===
| West Indies A (Cricket West Indies) | Surrey (England) |
|---|---|
| Shamarh Brooks (c); Jason Mohammed; Sunil Ambris; Jermaine Blackwood; Rahkeem Cornwall; Dominic Drakes; Chandrapaul Hemraj; Chemar Holder; Sherman Lewis; Andre McCarthy; John Campbell; Rovman Powell; Raymon Reifer; Devon Thomas; Oshane Thomas; Jomel Warrican | Tom Curran (c); Mark Stoneman; Arun Harinath; Scott Borthwick; Ryan Patel; Will Jacks; Adam Rouse; Mathew Pillans; Stuart Meaker; Morne Morkel; Gus Atkinson; Amar Virdi |

=== Tour match ===
16–18 July 2018
Scorecard

| Surrey | v | (Cricket West Indies) West Indies A |
| 366 (98.3 overs); Scott Borthwick 175* (279); Raymon Reifer 3/65 (20.3 overs) | | 178 (55.1 overs); Vishaul Singh 47 (112); Morne Morkel 3/12 (13 overs) |
| 173/4d (37 overs); Ryan Patel 48 (86); Odean Smith 2/15 (5 overs) | | 194/3 (50 overs); Sunil Ambris 63 (99); Stuart Meaker 1/29 (7 overs) |

Match drawn
The Oval, London
Umpires: Paul Baldwin (Eng) and Mike Burns (Eng)

- Surrey won the toss and elected to bat.
