= West Indian cricket team in India in 2018–19 =

International cricket tour

| | India | West Indies |
- Dates: 29 September – 11 November 2018
| Captains | Virat Kohli (Tests and ODIs); Rohit Sharma (T20Is) | Jason Holder (Note: Kraigg Brathwaite captained the West Indies for the first Test.) (Tests and ODIs); Carlos Brathwaite (T20Is) |

Test series
- Result: India won the 2-match series 2–0
| Most runs | Prithvi Shaw (237) | Roston Chase (185) |
| Most wickets | Umesh Yadav (11) | Jason Holder (5) |
- Player of the series: Prithvi Shaw (Ind)

One Day International series
- Results: India won the 5-match series 3–1
| Most runs | Virat Kohli (453) | Shimron Hetmyer (259) |
| Most wickets | Kuldeep Yadav (9) | Ashley Nurse (5) |
- Player of the series: Virat Kohli (Ind)

Twenty20 International series
- Results: India won the 3-match series 3–0
| Most runs | Shikhar Dhawan (138) | Darren Bravo (71) |
| Most wickets | Kuldeep Yadav (5) | Oshane Thomas (3) |
- Player of the series: Kuldeep Yadav (Ind)

The West Indies cricket team toured India from September to November 2018 to play two Tests, five One Day Internationals (ODIs) and three Twenty20 International (T20I) matches. Ahead of the Test series, there was a two-day practice match in Vadodara.

Jason Holder was ruled out of the first Test due to an injury, with Kraigg Brathwaite captaining the West Indies in his place. India won the match, their 100th win in Tests at home. India went on to win the second Test by 10 wickets, winning the series 2–0. It was India's tenth consecutive series win at home in Tests.

The second ODI was the 950th ODI to be played by India, and they became the first team to achieve this milestone. During the match, India's captain Virat Kohli became the fastest batsman to score 10,000 runs in ODIs, taking 205 innings, beating the previous record of 259 innings set by Sachin Tendulkar. India went on to win the five-match ODI series 3–1, after the second ODI ended in a tie.

India's regular wicket-keeper for limited overs matches, MS Dhoni, was not named in the side's squad for the T20I fixtures for this series and the ones against Australia. Instead, India's Test wicket-keeper, Rishabh Pant, was selected in Dhoni's place. Rohit Sharma was also named as India's captain for the T20I matches against the West Indies, with Virat Kohli being rested. India won the T20I series 3–0.

== Background ==
Originally, one of the ODI matches had been allocated to the Greenfield International Stadium in Thiruvananthapuram, per the Board of Control for Cricket in India's (BCCI) Tours and Fixtures Committee. However, when the fixtures were announced in March 2018, the match was allocated to the Jawaharlal Nehru Stadium in Kochi instead. The Kerala Cricket Association (KCA) requested that the BCCI reviews the decision. Two days later, the BCCI announced the fixture would be played in Thiruvananthapuram.

In September 2018, it was confirmed that the Ekana International Cricket Stadium in Lucknow would host its first ever international match. The last time Lucknow hosted an international match was in January 1994, when India played a Test match against Sri Lanka at the K. D. Singh Babu Stadium. Later the same month, it was reported that the second ODI match may be moved from the Holkar Stadium in Indore, due to a row about complimentary-ticket allocations. On 3 October 2018, the BCCI confirmed that the second ODI would be moved to the Dr. Y. S. Rajasekhara Reddy ACA–VDCA Cricket Stadium, in Visakhapatnam. On 12 October 2018, the BCCI moved the fourth ODI from the Wankhede Stadium to Brabourne Stadium due to administrative issues. On the day before the second T20I, the Ekana Stadium was renamed in honour of Atal Bihari Vajpayee.

== Squads ==
| Tests | | ODIs | | T20Is | |
| India | West Indies | India | West Indies | India | West Indies |
|---|---|---|---|---|---|
| Virat Kohli (c); Ajinkya Rahane (vc); Mayank Agarwal; Ravichandran Ashwin; Ravindra Jadeja; Rishabh Pant (wk); Cheteshwar Pujara; KL Rahul; Mohammed Shami; Prithvi Shaw; Mohammed Siraj; Shardul Thakur; Hanuma Vihari; Kuldeep Yadav; Umesh Yadav | Jason Holder (c); Sunil Ambris; Devendra Bishoo; Kraigg Brathwaite; Roston Chase; Shane Dowrich; Shannon Gabriel; Jahmar Hamilton; Shimron Hetmyer; Shai Hope (wk); ~~Alzarri Joseph~~; Shermon Lewis; Keemo Paul; Kieran Powell; Kemar Roach; Jomel Warrican | Virat Kohli (c); Rohit Sharma (vc); Khaleel Ahmed; Jasprit Bumrah; Yuzvendra Chahal; Shikhar Dhawan; MS Dhoni (wk); Ravindra Jadeja; Kedar Jadhav; Bhuvneshwar Kumar; Ambati Rayudu; Manish Pandey; Rishabh Pant; KL Rahul; Mohammed Shami; ~~Shardul Thakur~~; Kuldeep Yadav; Umesh Yadav | Jason Holder (c); Fabian Allen; Sunil Ambris; Devendra Bishoo; Chandrapaul Hemraj; Shimron Hetmyer; Shai Hope (wk); Alzarri Joseph; ~~Evin Lewis~~; Obed McCoy; Ashley Nurse; Keemo Paul; Kieran Powell; Rovman Powell; Kemar Roach; Marlon Samuels; Oshane Thomas | Rohit Sharma (c); Khaleel Ahmed; Jasprit Bumrah; Yuzvendra Chahal; Shikhar Dhawan; Shreyas Iyer; Dinesh Karthik; Siddarth Kaul; Bhuvneshwar Kumar; Shahbaz Nadeem; Manish Pandey; Krunal Pandya; Rishabh Pant (wk); KL Rahul; Washington Sundar; Kuldeep Yadav; Umesh Yadav | Carlos Brathwaite (c); Fabian Allen; Darren Bravo; Shimron Hetmyer; Shai Hope; ~~Evin Lewis~~; Obed McCoy; ~~Ashley Nurse~~; Keemo Paul; Khary Pierre; Kieron Pollard; Nicholas Pooran; Rovman Powell; Denesh Ramdin (wk); ~~Andre Russell~~; Sherfane Rutherford; Oshane Thomas |

Before the start of the tour, Alzarri Joseph was ruled out of the West Indies' Test squad and was replaced by Shermon Lewis. Evin Lewis withdrew from the West Indies' limited-overs squads for personal reasons. Kieran Powell and Nicholas Pooran replaced him in the ODI and T20I squads respectively. Ashley Nurse suffered an injury during the fourth ODI, and was ruled out of the next ODI match and the T20I series. Andre Russell was ruled out of the West Indies' T20I squad due to injury, and Shai Hope was added to the squad.

Shardul Thakur was ruled out of India's ODI squad and was replaced by Umesh Yadav. Bhuvneshwar Kumar and Jasprit Bumrah were added to India's ODI squad for the last three matches of the series, with Mohammed Shami being dropped. Kedar Jadhav was added to India's ODI squad for the fourth and fifth ODIs. Jasprit Bumrah, Kuldeep Yadav and Umesh Yadav were rested for the third T20I and Siddarth Kaul was added India's T20I squad.

== Tour match ==
=== Two-day match: Indian Board President's XI vs West Indies ===
29–30 September 2018
Scorecard

| Indian Board President's XI (India) | v | West Indies |
| 360/6d (90 overs); Ankit Bawne 116* (191); Devendra Bishoo 3/104 (21 overs) | | 366/7d (60 overs); Sunil Ambris 114* (98); Avesh Khan 4/60 (17 overs) |

Match drawn
Reliance Stadium, Vadodara
Umpires: Sanjay Hazare (Ind) and Amiesh Saheba (Ind)

- Indian Board President's XI won the toss and elected to bat.

== Test series ==
=== 1st Test ===
4–8 October 2018 (Note: While five days of play were scheduled for each Test, both Tests reached a result in three days.)
Scorecard

| India | v | West Indies |
| 649/9d (149.5 overs); Virat Kohli 139 (230); Devendra Bishoo 4/217 (54 overs) | | 181 (48 overs); Roston Chase 53 (79); Ravichandran Ashwin 4/37 (11 overs) |
| | | 196 (50.5 overs) (f/o); Kieran Powell 83 (93); Kuldeep Yadav 5/57 (14 overs) |

India won by an innings and 272 runs
Saurashtra Cricket Association Stadium, Rajkot
Umpires: Ian Gould (Eng) and Nigel Llong (Eng)
Player of the match: Prithvi Shaw (Ind)

- India won the toss and elected to bat.
- Prithvi Shaw (Ind) and Shermon Lewis (WI) both made their Test debuts.
- Prithvi Shaw scored his maiden century in Tests and became the youngest batsman to make a Test century on debut for India (18 years and 329 days).
- Virat Kohli scored his 30th century in international cricket as captain of India.
- Ravindra Jadeja (Ind) scored his first century in Tests.
- Kuldeep Yadav (Ind) took his first five-wicket haul in Tests.
- This was India's biggest win by an innings and was their 100th win at home in Tests.

=== 2nd Test ===
12–16 October 2018
Scorecard

| West Indies | v | India |
| 311 (101.4 overs); Roston Chase 106 (189); Umesh Yadav 6/88 (26.4 overs) | | 367 (106.4 overs); Rishabh Pant 92 (134); Jason Holder 5/56 (23 overs) |
| 127 (46.1 overs); Sunil Ambris 38 (95); Umesh Yadav 4/45 (12.1 overs) | | 75/0 (16.1 overs); Prithvi Shaw 33* (45) |

India won by 10 wickets
Rajiv Gandhi International Cricket Stadium, Hyderabad
Umpires: Ian Gould (Eng) and Bruce Oxenford (Aus)
Player of the match: Umesh Yadav (Ind)

- West Indies won the toss and elected to bat.
- Shardul Thakur (Ind) made his Test debut.
- Umesh Yadav took his first ten-wicket haul in Tests and became only the third fast-bowler for India to take a 10-wicket haul at home in Tests.

== ODI series ==
=== 1st ODI ===
21 October 2018
13:30 (D/N)
Scorecard

| West Indies; 322/8 (50 overs) | v | India; 326/2 (42.1 overs) |
| Shimron Hetmyer 106 (78); Yuzvendra Chahal 3/41 (10 overs) | | Rohit Sharma 152* (117); Devendra Bishoo 1/72 (10 overs) |

India won by 8 wickets
Assam Cricket Association Stadium, Guwahati
Umpires: Nitin Menon (Ind) and Paul Wilson (Aus)
Player of the match: Virat Kohli (Ind)

- India won the toss and elected to field.
- Rishabh Pant (Ind), Oshane Thomas and Chandrapaul Hemraj (WI) all made their ODI debuts.
- This was the first ODI to be played at this venue.
- Marlon Samuels (WI) played in his 200th ODI.
- Virat Kohli (Ind) scored his 60th century in international cricket, becoming the quickest to achieve this feat in terms of number of innings (386).
- Rohit Sharma (Ind) scored his 20th century in ODIs.

=== 2nd ODI ===
24 October 2018
13:30 (D/N)
Scorecard

| India; 321/6 (50 overs) | v | West Indies; 321/7 (50 overs) |
| Virat Kohli 157* (129); Ashley Nurse 2/46 (10 overs) | | Shai Hope 123* (134); Kuldeep Yadav 3/67 (10 overs) |

Match tied
ACA–VDCA Cricket Stadium, Visakhapatnam
Umpires: Ian Gould (Eng) and C. K. Nandan (Ind)
Player of the match: Virat Kohli (Ind)

- India won the toss and elected to bat.
- Obed McCoy (WI) made his ODI debut.
- Virat Kohli (Ind) became the fastest batsman, in terms of innings, to score 10,000 runs in ODIs (205).
- Umesh Yadav (Ind) played his last ODI.

=== 3rd ODI ===
27 October 2018
13:30 (D/N)
Scorecard

| West Indies; 283/9 (50 overs) | v | India; 240 (47.4 overs) |
| Shai Hope 95 (113); Jasprit Bumrah 4/35 (10 overs) | | Virat Kohli 107 (119); Marlon Samuels 3/12 (3.4 overs) |

West Indies won by 43 runs
Maharashtra Cricket Association Stadium, Pune
Umpires: Chettithody Shamshuddin (Ind) and Paul Wilson (Aus)
Player of the match: Ashley Nurse (WI)

- India won the toss and elected to field.
- Fabian Allen (WI) made his ODI debut.
- Virat Kohli became the first batsman for India, and tenth overall, to score three successive centuries in ODIs. He was also the first captain to achieve this.

=== 4th ODI ===
29 October 2018
13:30 (D/N)
Scorecard

| India; 377/5 (50 overs) | v | West Indies; 153 (36.2 overs) |
| Rohit Sharma 162 (137); Kemar Roach 2/74 (10 overs) | | Jason Holder 54* (70); Khaleel Ahmed 3/13 (5 overs) |

India won by 224 runs
Brabourne Stadium, Mumbai
Umpires: Anil Chaudhary (Ind) and Ian Gould (Eng)
Player of the match: Rohit Sharma (Ind)

- India won the toss and elected to bat.
- This was India's third biggest victory by runs in ODIs.
- This was the West Indies' biggest margin of defeat by runs to India in ODIs.

=== 5th ODI ===
1 November 2018
13:30 (D/N)
Scorecard

| West Indies; 104 (31.5 overs) | v | India; 105/1 (14.5 overs) |
| Jason Holder 25 (33); Ravindra Jadeja 4/34 (9.5 overs) | | Rohit Sharma 63* (56); Oshane Thomas 1/33 (4 overs) |

India won by 9 wickets
Greenfield International Stadium, Thiruvananthapuram
Umpires: Anil Chaudhary (Ind) and Paul Wilson (Aus)
Player of the match: Ravindra Jadeja (Ind)

- West Indies won the toss and elected to bat.
- This was the first ODI to be played at this venue.
- This was the West Indies' lowest total against India in ODIs.

== T20I series ==
=== 1st T20I ===
4 November 2018
19:00 (N)
Scorecard

| West Indies; 109/8 (20 overs) | v | India; 110/5 (17.5 overs) |
| Fabian Allen 27 (20); Kuldeep Yadav 3/13 (4 overs) | | Dinesh Karthik 31* (34); Carlos Brathwaite 2/11 (4 overs) |

India won by 5 wickets
Eden Gardens, Kolkata
Umpires: C. K. Nandan (Ind) and Chettithody Shamshuddin (Ind)
Player of the match: Kuldeep Yadav (Ind)

- India won the toss and elected to field.
- Khaleel Ahmed, Krunal Pandya (Ind), Fabian Allen, Khary Pierre and Oshane Thomas (WI) all made their T20I debuts.

=== 2nd T20I ===
6 November 2018
19:00 (N)
Scorecard

| India; 195/2 (20 overs) | v | West Indies; 124/9 (20 overs) |
| Rohit Sharma 111* (61); Fabian Allen 1/33 (4 overs) | | Darren Bravo 23 (18); Bhuvneshwar Kumar 2/12 (4 overs) |

India won by 71 runs
Ekana Cricket Stadium, Lucknow
Umpires: Anil Chaudhary (Ind) and C. K. Nandan (Ind)
Player of the match: Rohit Sharma (Ind)

- West Indies won the toss and elected to field.
- This was the first international cricket match to be played at this venue.
- Shikhar Dhawan (Ind) scored his 1,000th run in T20Is.
- Rohit Sharma (Ind) became the first cricketer to score four centuries in T20Is.

=== 3rd T20I ===
11 November 2018
19:00 (N)
Scorecard

| West Indies; 181/3 (20 overs) | v | India; 182/4 (20 overs) |
| Nicholas Pooran 53* (25); Yuzvendra Chahal 2/28 (4 overs) | | Shikhar Dhawan 92 (62); Keemo Paul 2/32 (3 overs) |

India won by 6 wickets
M. A. Chidambaram Stadium, Chennai
Umpires: Anil Chaudhary (Ind) and Chettithody Shamshuddin (Ind)
Player of the match: Shikhar Dhawan (Ind)

- West Indies won the toss and elected to bat.
