= Josh Dell =

English cricketer (born 1997)

Personal information
- Full name: Joshua Jamie Dell
- Born: 26 September 1997 (age 29); Tenbury Wells, Worcestershire, England
- Batting: Right-handed
- Bowling: Right-arm medium-fast
- Role: Batsman

Domestic team information
- Years: Team
- 2018–2022: Worcestershire (squad no. 52)
- FC debut: 14 May 2019 Worcestershire v Durham
- LA debut: 19 June 2018 Worcestershire v West Indies A

Career statistics
Competition	FC	List A
Matches	7	6
Runs scored	158	136
Batting average	13.16	27.20
100s/50s	0/1	0/0
Top score	61	46
Catches/stumpings	5/–	1/–
- Source: Cricinfo, 7 August 2021

Joshua Jamie Dell (born 26 September 1997) is an English cricketer. He made his List A debut for Worcestershire against the West Indies A in a tri-series warm-up match on 19 June 2018. He made his first-class debut on 14 May 2019, for Worcestershire in the 2019 County Championship.
