= Donald Butchart =

Zimbabwean cricketer (born 1998)

Personal information
- Full name: Donald Norton Butchart
- Born: 10 December 1998 (age 27); Harare, Zimbabwe
- Height: 1.84 m (6 ft 0 in)
- Batting: Right-handed
- Bowling: Right-arm medium

Domestic team information
- Years: Team
- 2018: Leicestershire
- Only List A: 19 June 2018 Leicestershire v India A

Career statistics
Competition	List A
Matches	1
Runs scored	12
Batting average	12.00
100s/50s	0/0
Top score	12
Catches/stumpings	0/–
- Source: Cricinfo, 29 September 2018

Donald Norton Butchart (born 10 December 1998) is a Zimbabwe-born cricketer. He made his List A debut for Leicestershire against India A in a tri-series warm-up match on 19 June 2018.
