= Mitchell Spencer =

English cricketer (born 1993)

Personal information
- Full name: Mitchell Thomas Spencer
- Born: 8 March 1993 (age 33); Stoke-on-Trent, Staffordshire, England
- Batting: Right-handed
- Bowling: Right-arm medium-fast
- Role: Bowler

Domestic team information
- Years: Team
- 2018: Worcestershire
- Only List A: 19 June 2018; Worcestershire v West Indies A

Career statistics
Competition	List A
Matches	1
Runs scored	–
Batting average	–
100s/50s	–/–
Top score	–
Balls bowled	30
Wickets	0
Bowling average	–
5 wickets in innings	0
10 wickets in match	0
Best bowling	–
Catches/stumpings	0/–
- Source: Cricinfo, 19 June 2018

Mitchell Thomas Spencer (born 8 March 1993) is an English cricketer. He made his List A debut for Worcestershire against the West Indies A in a tri-series warm-up match on 19 June 2018.
