= Olly Westbury =

English cricketer (born 1997)

Ollie Westbury
Personal information
- Full name: Oliver Edward Westbury
- Born: 2 July 1997 (age 29); Dudley, West Midlands, England
- Batting: Right-handed
- Bowling: Right-arm off break
- Role: Batsman

Domestic team information
- Years: Team
- 2016–2019: Shropshire
- 2018: Worcestershire (squad no. 19)
- 2021: Cornwall
- 2023 - 2024: Shropshire
- FC debut: 10 September 2018 Worcestershire v Surrey
- Only LA: 19 June 2018 Worcestershire v West Indies A

Career statistics
Competition	FC	LA	T20
Matches	2	1	1
Runs scored	49	8	24
Batting average	12.25	8.00	24.00
100s/50s	0/0	0/0	0/0
Top score	22	8	24
Catches/stumpings	1/–	0/–	0/–
- Source: Cricinfo, 13 September 2018

Oliver Edward Westbury (born 2 July 1997) is an English cricketer. He made his List A debut for Worcestershire against the West Indies A in a tri-series warm-up match on 19 June 2018. He made his Twenty20 debut for Worcestershire in the 2018 t20 Blast on 10 August 2018. He made his first-class debut for Worcestershire in the 2018 County Championship on 10 September 2018. After his release by Worcestershire he became a sports reporter for the Shropshire Star. before joining Midlands marketing agency 8848

He is currently Club Captain at Himley Cricket Club
