= Beyond All Boundaries (2013 film) =

2013 Indian documentary film

- Directed by: Sushrut Jain
- Starring: Kunal Nayyar
- Release date: April 2013
- Running time: 97 minutes
- Country: India
- Language: Hindi

Beyond All Boundaries is a 2013 Indian Hindi-language cricket documentary film directed by Sushrut Jain which is based on the real-life story of three ordinary individuals for whom the sport is a route to fame and a purpose. The film also portrays their addiction to the game, the desperation for winning a World Cup after 28 years.

The story was narrated by Kunal Nayyar who is known for his portrayal of Rajesh Koothrapalli in an American television series The Big Bang Theory. The film was screened at the Indian Film Festival of Los Angeles in 2013 and managed to grab a grand jury prize for Best Documentary and the audience award.

== Plot ==
The film is set during the 2011 Cricket World Cup and chronicles the travails of unemployed Sudhir Kumar Chaudhary, who is a die-hard fan of Sachin Tendulkar and used to attend every home match the Indian team had played since 2007, Akshaya Surwe, a young lady from Mumbai dreams of making it to the Indian Women's National Cricket Team, and Prithvi Shaw, a twelve-year-old boy whose mother died when he was only three years old. He is the only hope of his father.

== Production ==
=== Development ===
Jain sent Kunal and his wife Neha Kapur the screener of Beyond All Boundaries. After seeing the film, Kunal was convinced that it deserved to be given a larger platform and decided to help Sushrut raise funds for the film. He took on the role of producer and also shot a video as an endorsement of the film from his end. The video grabbed the attention of a few festival heads and international funders.

== Screening ==
The film was screened at the Indian Film Festival of Los Angeles in 2013 and was awarded the grand jury prize for Best Documentary and the audience award. It was selected to premiere at the Mumbai Film Festival on 20 October 2017.

== Release ==
Beyond All Boundaries was released in theaters on 10 October 2014 in New Delhi, Mumbai, and Pune.

== Reception ==
Rahul Desai of Mumbai Mirror gave the film three stars out of five and noted "it creates a burning curiosity, to instantly find out where these three lives stand today in 2014, not only from a cricketing perspective. Watch this, if only to be reminded how one man’s passion is every other man’s lunacy." Wiring in DNA Pranav Joshi states "It's worth a watch, simply for how much heart the protagonists have put into playing their roles, and for the beautiful way in which it brings out social contrasts in India." Ravi Krishnan of Live Mint says "this film overcomes its clichés and stays relevant primarily as a human drama."

== Awards and nominations ==
Accolades for Beyond All Boundaries
Year	Award	Category	Work	Result	Ref(s)
2013	Indian Film Festival of Los Angeles Awards	Best Documentary	Beyond All Boundaries	Won	
