= Rishabh Pant =

Indian cricketer (born 1997)

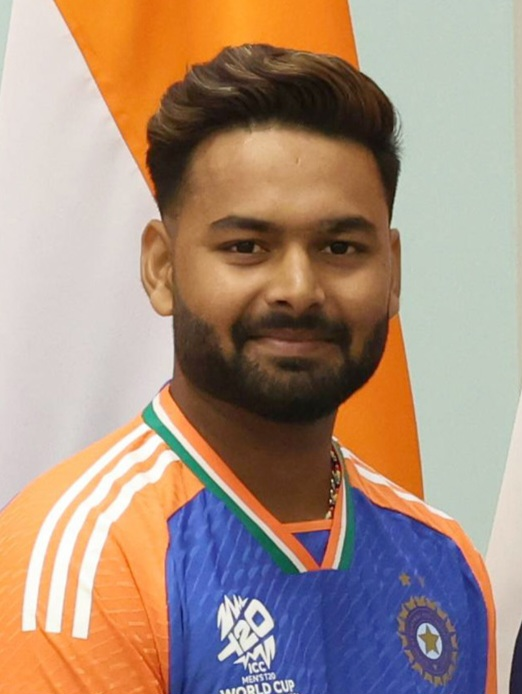
- Pant in 2024

Personal information
- Full name: Rishabh Rajendra Pant
- Born: 4 October 1997 (age 29); Haridwar, Uttar Pradesh (now Uttarakhand), India
- Height: 5 ft 7 in (170 cm)
- Batting: Left-handed
- Bowling: Right-arm medium
- Role: Wicket-keeper-batter

International information
- National side: India (2017–present)
- Test debut (cap 291): 18 August 2018 v England
- Last Test: 15 August 2026 v Sri Lanka
- ODI debut (cap 224): 21 October 2018 v West Indies
- Last ODI: 7 August 2024 v Sri Lanka
- ODI shirt no.: 17
- T20I debut (cap 68): 1 February 2017 v England
- Last T20I: 28 July 2024 v Sri Lanka
- T20I shirt no.: 17

Domestic team information
- Years: Team
- 2015–present: Delhi
- 2016–2024, 2027–present: Delhi Capitals
- 2025–2026: Lucknow Super Giants

Career statistics
Competition	Test	ODI	T20I	FC
Matches	48	31	76	74
Runs scored	3,662	871	1,209	5,472
Batting average	43.50	33.50	23.25	47.17
100s/50s	8/20	1/5	0/3	13/28
Top score	159*	125*	65*	308
Catches/stumpings	158/15	27/1	40/11	239/22
Medal record
Men's cricket
Representing India
World Test Championship
Runner-up	2019–2021
ICC T20 World Cup
Winner	2024 West Indies & USA
ICC Champions Trophy
Winner	2025 Pakistan
ICC U19 Cricket World Cup
Runner-up	2016 Bangladesh
- Source: ESPNcricinfo, 8 November 2025

Rishabh Rajendra Pant (Hindi: [ɾɪˈʂʌbʰ ɾaː'dʒeːd̪ɾə pʌnt̪]; born 4 October 1997) is an Indian international cricketer who plays for the Indian national team as a wicket-keeper batter. He plays for the Delhi Capitals in the Indian Premier League and Delhi in domestic cricket.

Pant became the most expensive player in the history of the Indian Premier League when he was bought for ₹27.00 crore (US$2.9 million) by the Lucknow Super Giants in the 2025 league auction. He was a member of the Indian team that won the 2024 T20 World Cup and 2025 Champions Trophy. He was the vice-captain of the India U19 team that was runner-up at the 2016 U19 Cricket World Cup.

He made his T20I debut for India in January 2017, his Test debut in August 2018, and his ODI debut in October 2018. He holds the record for most sixes hit by an Indian batter in Test cricket, and the third most overall. In June 2022, Pant was named as the Indian captain for the T20I series against South Africa, after the designated captain KL Rahul was ruled out of the series due to an injury.

== Early life ==
Pant was born on 4 October 1997 in Haridwar, Uttarakhand, India to Rajendra Pant and Saroj Pant, and hails from a Kumaoni family. He also has an elder sister, Sakshi Pant. At the age of 12, Pant would travel with his mother to Delhi during the weekends to train with Tarak Sinha at the Sonnet Cricket Academy. He and his mother stayed at a Gurdwara in Moti Bagh as they did not have suitable accommodation in the city.

Sinha suggested Pant switch to Rajasthan to play U-13 and U-15 cricket but to no avail. Pant was instructed by his mentor to overhaul his entire batting technique in the hopes of becoming a better batsman. His turning point came when he was playing U-19 cricket for Delhi against Assam. Pant had top-scored with 35 in his first innings and then hit 150 in the second innings, which he claims was the most important knock in his career.

On 1 February 2016, during the 2016 Under-19 Cricket World Cup, Pant hit an 18-ball fifty against Nepal, the fastest at this level.

Pant's father died on 6 April 2017, due to a cardiac arrest.

== Domestic career ==
Pant made his first-class debut on 22 October 2015 in the 2015–16 Ranji Trophy and his List A debut the next month in the 2015–16 Vijay Hazare Trophy.

In the 2016–17 Ranji Trophy, while playing a match against Maharashtra, Pant scored 308 runs in an innings, becoming the third-youngest Indian to score a triple century in first-class cricket.

On 8 November 2016, Pant scored the fastest century in the Ranji Trophy, from just 48 balls, in Delhi's match against Jharkhand.

In February 2017, Pant was named Delhi's captain for the 2016–17 Vijay Hazare Trophy. He took over from Gautam Gambhir, who led Delhi to the final of the previous season. Delhi coach Bhaskar Pillai said it was a "consensus decision" to prepare Pant for the future.

On 14 January 2018, in the 2017–18 Zonal T20 League match between Himachal Pradesh and Delhi, Pant scored the second-fastest century in a Twenty20 match, making 100 from 32 balls.

=== Indian Premier League ===
Season	Team	Matches	Runs	50s	100s
2016	Delhi Daredevils	10	198	1	0
2017	Delhi Daredevils	14	366	2	0
2018	Delhi Daredevils	14	684	5	1
2019	Delhi Capitals	16	488	3	0
2020	Delhi Capitals	14	343	1	0
2021	Delhi Capitals	16	419	3	0
2022	Delhi Capitals	13	340	0	0
2024	Delhi Capitals	14	446	3	0
2025	Lucknow Super Giants	14	269	1	1
2026	Lucknow Super Giants	14	312	1	0
Total		139	3865	20	2
As of 23 May 2026 – Source: IPL T20

Pant was purchased by the Delhi Daredevils ahead of the 2016 Indian Premier League on the same day he scored a century for India U-19 team in the 2016 Under-19 Cricket World Cup, guiding them into the semi-finals. Playing his third game of the season, Pant made 69 runs off 40 balls to help Delhi secure an eight-wicket victory over Gujarat Lions. In the 2017 season, he scored 97 runs from 43 balls against the same team.

During the 2018 Indian Premier League, Pant scored an unbeaten 128 from 63 balls against the Sunrisers Hyderabad, making it the then highest individual score by an Indian cricketer in IPL history. He also became the second youngest player to score a century in the IPL. His score of 128 also comprised 68.4% of the teams total, making it the 2nd highest percentage of runs by an individual batsmen in an IPL match. In March 2021, Pant was named the captain of the Delhi Capitals for the 2021 Indian Premier League after the regular captain Shreyas Iyer was ruled out of the entire tournament due to an injury. He was retained as captain for the 2022 IPL season as well. In 2024, Delhi Capitals part its way from Pant for upcoming season and released him in auction.

Lucknow Super Giants bought Pant for record 27 Crores in the auction making him the most expensive player in history of IPL. The owner announced Rishabh as the captain for the team on 21 January for the upcoming 2025 IPL season. He scored his second ton in Indian Premier League 2025 against Royal Challengers Bengaluru at the Ekana Cricket Stadium. After having a poor IPL 2026 both as a captain and a player for the Lucknow Super Giants, Pant resigned as the captain of team.On 23 June 2026, Rishabh Pant was traded from Lucknow Super Giants to Delhi Capitals in exchange for Kuldeep Yadav. He took a pay cut, with his salary reduced from ₹27 crore to ₹15 crore.

== International career ==
=== Early years (2017–19) ===
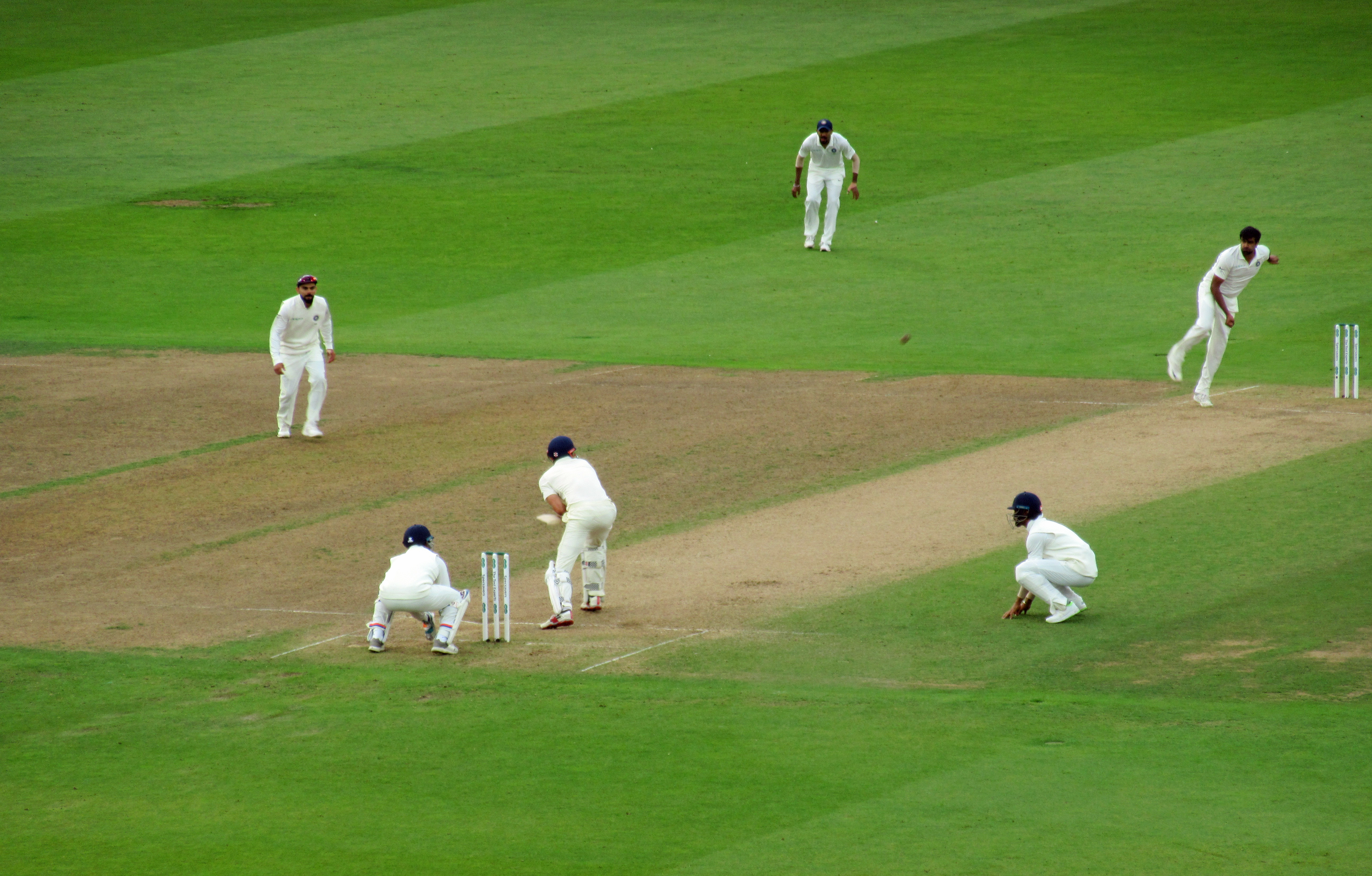
Rishabh Pant wicket-keeping in India vs England series 2018

In January 2017, Pant was named in India's Twenty20 International (T20I) squad for their series against England. He made his debut for India in the third T20I against England at the M. Chinnaswamy Stadium, Bangalore on 1 February 2017. Pant was the then youngest player to debut for India in a T20I match at the age of 19 years 120 days.

In February 2018, he was named in India's T20I squad for the 2018 Nidahas Trophy. In July 2018, Pant was named in India's Test squad for the series against England. He made his Test debut against England on 18 August 2018. He became the first batter for India to get off the mark in Test cricket with a six in the series. On 11 September 2018, Pant scored his maiden Test century, against England also becoming the second-youngest wicket-keeper and the first Indian wicket-keeper to score a Test century in England. The following month, he was named in India's One Day International (ODI) squad for their series against the West Indies. He made his ODI debut for India against the West Indies on 21 October 2018.

In December 2018, during the first Test against Australia, Pant took eleven catches, the most by a wicketkeeper for India in a Test match. In January 2019, during the fourth Test against Australia, Pant became the first wicketkeeper for India to score a century in a Test match in Australia.

In June 2019, Pant was called up to India's squad at the 2019 Cricket World Cup as a replacement for Shikhar Dhawan, who suffered a hairline fracture of his left thumb during India's game against Australia. Following the World Cup, the International Cricket Council (ICC) named Pant as the rising star of the squad.

In September 2019, during the second Test against the West Indies, Pant became the fastest wicketkeeper for India to affect fifty dismissals in Test cricket. In January 2021, during the fourth Test against Australia, Pant became the fastest wicketkeeper for India to reach 1,000 runs in Test cricket.

=== Form slump (2019–20) ===
The 2019–20 home season was billed as an important season for Pant with MS Dhoni announcing a hiatus from international cricket. India went into the season in search of a new wicket-keeping mainstay with Pant as one of the front-runners. However, ordinary performances from the left-hander and the emergence of KL Rahul as a wicket-keeping option meant that Pant slipped down the pecking order.

A dismal show in the 2020 IPL season didn't help either. Pant, who had scored a cumulative 1172 runs with a strike rate of 168 in the last two seasons, only managed to amass 343 runs with a strike rate of 113. His only fifty came in the finals in a losing cause.

Pant was consequently dropped from the limited-overs team touring Australia in 2020–21. He, however, kept his place in the Test team but did not make it to the playing eleven of the first Test in Adelaide.

During this period, Pant was heavily criticized by fans and the media. Disdainful comparisons with Indian cricket legend MS Dhoni were often brought up. There were instances of the crowd chanting "Dhoni! Dhoni!" when Pant made a mistake on the field.

=== Return to form (2021–22) ===
India was bowled out for 36 in the second innings of the first Test of the Border Gavaskar Trophy 2020–21 and hence lost the test by 8 wickets despite getting a healthy first-innings lead. Following this, Rishabh Pant was picked ahead of Wriddhiman Saha for the second test in Melbourne.

While Pant scored 29 in the first innings of the Melbourne Test, it was at Sydney that he played a career-changing knock. With 97 overs to survive on the last day, he played a counter-attacking knock of 97 runs off just 118 balls, also putting up a 148-run partnership with Cheteshwar Pujara. The match ultimately ended in a draw.

India had many first-choice players unavailable due to injury, and were the underdogs going into the match played in The Gabba where Australia had not been defeated since 1988. Pant put in a match-winning performance on day five, as India chased down a target of 328 in the fourth innings, scoring an unbeaten 89.

In September 2021, Pant was named in India's squad for the 2021 ICC Men's T20 World Cup. At the annual ICC Awards in January 2022, Pant was named in ICC Men's Test Team of the Year for 2021. In March 2022, during the second match against Sri Lanka, Pant scored the fastest half-century by a batter for India in a Test match, breaking the record previously held by Kapil Dev. He brought up his half-century in just 28 deliveries.

In May 2022, Pant was named as the vice-captain of the Indian team for the South Africa tour of India 2022 series. However, one day before the first match of the series, Pant was named as the captain, after India's captain KL Rahul was ruled of the series out due to an injury. At the age of 24 years and 248 days, Pant became the second-youngest captain to lead India in a T20I match. In July 2022, in the final match of India's tour of England, Pant recorded his maiden century in ODI cricket scoring 125 runs and remaining not out.

=== Return to international cricket and Test vice-captaincy (2024–present) ===
In April 2024, Pant was added to India's squad for the T20 World Cup in June, marking his maiden comeback to international cricket following his horror car crash in late 2022. His game management was praised as a critical part of India's victory in the final against South Africa. In June 2025, he became the first Indian cricketer to score hundreds in both innings of a Test in England. Also, he became the second wicket keeper batter to smash centuries in both innings of a single test match after Andy Flower. He became the fastest Indian wicketkeeper to complete 3,000 runs by completing it in 76 innings in Tests. He achieved all these records by slamming twin centuries in the 1st Test at Headingley as part of the 5-match Test Series from June–August 2025 for the Anderson–Tendulkar Trophy.

During the first Test of South Africa's 2025 tour of India at Kolkata, Pant stood-in as captain for most of the match after regular captain Shubman Gill was absent due to an injury he suffered on the first day. India lost the Test and Pant's captaincy tactics came under criticism from former cricketers. With Gill being ruled out of the series, Pant was officially elevated to captaincy in the second Test at Guwahati, becoming India's 38th Test captain. India lost the second match by 408 runs, its biggest ever defeat in Tests, resulting in a 0–2 series whitewash. Pant's leadership and shot selection during the second Test was also widely criticised.

Before the one-off Test against Afghanistan in June 2026, Pant was replaced as the vice-captain of the Indian Test team by KL Rahul.

During the 1st Test against Sri Lanka, Pant became the fourth batter to hit 100 sixes in Test cricket.

During the 1st Test of the New Zealand series, Pant became the first Asian wicket-keeper to score century in all SENA nation. He also became the batter with the second most sixes in Test cricket history in the same match, overtaking Brendon McCullum.

== Awards and nominations ==
- In January 2019, Pant was named the ICC Men's Emerging Cricketer of the Year at the 2018 ICC Awards.
- In February 2021, Pant became the first player to be named ICC Men's Player of the Month (for January).
- In 2025, Rishabh Pant was nominated for the Laureus World Sports Award for Comeback of the Year.

== 2022 car crash ==
On 30 December 2022, Pant was involved in a near-fatal car crash on the Delhi-Dehradun Expressway at Narsan Kalan village near Roorkee. He was cleared of any serious injury and remained stable despite sustaining injuries to his head, back and feet including two cuts on his forehead and a ligament tear to his right knee. He also hurt his right wrist, ankle and toe and suffered abrasion injuries to his back. Pant was initially admitted to Saksham Hospital in Roorkee, and was later transferred to Max Hospital in Dehradun. The MRI scans of his brain and spine indicated they were normal but he was advised to undergo plastic surgery for his facial injuries, lacerations and abrasions. Scans of his ankle and knee were postponed due to pain and swelling.

Pant was reportedly driving his Mercedes-AMG GLE 43 Coupe from New Delhi to his hometown Roorkee and was the only person inside the vehicle, according to eye-witnesses. The car reportedly caught fire when it collided with a central divider on the road. The incident was reported to have taken place at 5:30 am and the car skidded for about 200 metres before hitting the road divider. Some sources claimed that Pant may have fallen asleep while driving. He was rescued by Sushil Mann, a bus driver, and Paramjeet Singh, a bus conductor, both employees of Haryana Roadways. His injuries kept him out until his return to competitive cricket in the 2024 Indian Premier League.

== See also ==
- List of Ranji Trophy triple centuries
