= Shermon Lewis =

West Indian cricketer (born 1995)

Personal information
- Full name: Shermon Hakim Lewis
- Born: 21 October 1995 (age 31); Mount Horne, St Andrew, Grenada
- Batting: Right-handed
- Bowling: Right-arm Fast
- Role: Bowler

International information
- National side: West Indies (2018–2022)
- Test debut (cap 316): 4 October 2018 v India
- Last Test: 30 November 2018 v Bangladesh
- Only ODI (cap 211): 4 June 2022 v Netherlands

Domestic team information
- Years: Team
- 2017–present: Windward Islands

Career statistics
Competition	Test	ODI	FC	LA
Matches	2	1	44	16
Runs scored	24	0	351	54
Batting average	6.00	–	7.46	13.50
100s/50s	0/0	0/0	0/0	0/0
Top score	20	–	33	15*
Balls bowled	240	59	5,693	637
Wickets	3	3	116	23
Bowling average	54.00	22.33	27.24	28.91
5 wickets in innings	0	0	4	0
10 wickets in match	0	0	0	0
Best bowling	2/93	3/67	7/76	3/18
Catches/stumpings	1/–	3/–	19/–	8/–
- Source: ESPNCricinfo, 4 June 2024

Shermon Lewis (born 21 October 1995) is a West Indian cricketer. He made his first-class debut for the Windward Islands in the 2016–17 Regional Four Day Competition on 10 March 2017. In November 2017, he took his maiden five-wicket haul in first-class cricket, bowling for the Windward Islands against Trinidad and Tobago in the 2017–18 Regional Four Day Competition. He made his List A debut for the West Indies A against the England Lions in a tri-series on 28 June 2018.

In September 2018, he was added to the West Indies' Test squad for the series against India. He made his Test debut against India on 4 October 2018.

In October 2019, he was named in the Windward Islands' squad for the 2019–20 Regional Super50 tournament.

In May 2022, he was named in the West Indies One Day International (ODI) squads for their series against the Netherlands and Pakistan. He made his ODI debut on 4 June 2022, for the West Indies against the Netherlands.
