= Ben Twohig =

English cricketer (born 1998)

Personal information
- Full name: Benjamin Jake Twohig
- Born: 13 April 1998 (age 28); Dewsbury, West Yorkshire, England
- Batting: Right-handed
- Bowling: Slow left arm orthodox
- Role: All-rounder

Domestic team information
- Years: Team
- 2016–2020: Worcestershire (squad no. 42)
- First-class debut: 4 May 2018 Worcestershire v Surrey
- Only List A: 19 June 2018; Worcestershire v West Indies A

Career statistics
Competition	FC	LA
Matches	7	1
Runs scored	145	1
Batting average	13.18	1.00
100s/50s	0/0	0/0
Top score	35	1
Balls bowled	966	60
Wickets	10	0
Bowling average	59.80	–
5 wickets in innings	0	–
10 wickets in match	0	–
Best bowling	2/47	–
Catches/stumpings	3/–	1/–
- Source: ESPNcricinfo, 29 September 2018

Benjamin Jake Twohig (born 13 April 1998) is an English cricketer. He made his first-class debut on 4 May 2018, for Worcestershire in the 2018 County Championship. He made his List A debut for Worcestershire against the West Indies A in a tri-series warm-up match on 19 June 2018.
