= 2019–20 Indian cricket season =

Cricket in India
- Season: 2019–20

Men's cricket
- Ranji Trophy: Saurashtra
- Duleep Trophy: India Red
- Vijay Hazare Trophy: Karnataka
- Deodhar Trophy: India B
- Syed Mushtaq Ali Trophy: Karnataka
- Indian Premier League: Mumbai Indians

Women's cricket
- T20 League: Railways women
- T20 Challenger Trophy: India C Women
- Women's T20 Challenge: IPL Trailblazers

The 2019–20 Indian cricket season is the ongoing and 126th cricket season since the commencement of first-class cricket in India. The international cricket season started in September 2019 with South Africa's tour of India. The T20I series between the nations was drawn 1−1 while India clean swept the test series 3−0. India is currently hosting Bangladesh. India won the T20I series 2−1. India will play 2-match test series against Bangladesh which will include the first day/night test match to be played by either side. India will also host tours from West Indies, Sri Lanka and Australia. India will also host home games for Afghanistan which include tours from West Indies and Ireland. South African women toured India. India won the WT20I series 3–1 and WODI series 3–0. Originally, Zimbabwe were scheduled to tour India in January 2020. However, in September 2019, India cancelled the Zimbabwe series following the ICC's suspension of Zimbabwe Cricket, with Sri Lanka replacing them.

The A-team season consisted of tours from Sri Lanka A and South Africa. Sri Lanka A lost the first class series 2–0 and drew the one-day series 2–2. South Africa A lost the first class series 1–0 and lost the one-day series 4–1.

Paytm retained the title sponsorship of international and domestic Indian cricket tournaments for five years. BCCI partnered with All India Radio for radio commentary of all international and selected domestic games for 2019-20 and 2020–21 season.

The domestic season retained the same format of last year. The domestic season began with Duleep trophy and is scheduled to end in May with 13th season of Indian Premiere League. India Red won the Duleep trophy. Karnataka won the Vijay Hazare Trophy. India B won the Deodhar Trophy. The women's domestic season began in October with the T20 League and is scheduled to end in March with Women's T20 Challenge (Women's IPL). Railways won the T20 League.

== International ==
Men's International tours
Dates	Tournament	Home team	Away team	Results [Matches]		
Dates	Tournament	Home team	Away team	Test	ODI	T20I
15 September 2019- 23 October 2019	South Africa tour of India	India	South Africa	3−0 [3]	—	1−1 [3]
3 November 2019- 26 November 2019	Bangladesh tour of India	India	Bangladesh	2−0 [2]	—	2−1 [3]
4 November 2019- 1 December 2019	West Indies against Afghanistan in India	Afghanistan	West Indies	0-1 [1]	0-3 [3]	2-1 [3]
6 December 2019- 22 December 2019	West Indies tour of India	India	West Indies	—	2−1 [3]	2−1 [3]
5 January 2020- 10 January 2020	Sri Lanka tour of India	India	Sri Lanka	—	—	2-0 [3]
14 January 2020- 19 January 2020	Australia tour of India	India	Australia	—	2-1 [3]	—
6 March 2020- 10 March 2020	Ireland against Afghanistan in India	Afghanistan	Ireland	—	—	2-1 [3]
12 March 2020- 18 March 2020	South Africa ODI tour of India	India	South Africa	—	[3]	—
Women's International tours
Dates	Tournament	Home team	Away team	Results [Matches]		
Dates	Tournament	Home team	Away team	WTest	WODI	WT20I
20 September 2019- 14 October 2019	South Africa women tour of India	India	South Africa	—	3–0 [3]	3–1 [6]

- Series part of 2019–2021 World Test Championship.

=== India-A, India-B and India U-19 Teams ===
International tours
Dates	Tournament	Home team	Away team	Results [Matches]	
Dates	Tournament	Home team	Away team	FC	LA
25 May 2019- 15 June 2019	Sri Lankan A tour of India	India A	Sri Lanka A	2-0 [2]	2-2 [6]
29 August 2019- 20 September 2019	South Africa A tour of India	India A	South Africa A	1-0 [2]	4-1 [5]

== Domestic ==
BCCI announced the domestic schedule in July 2019. It largely retained the format of previous season with a total of 2036 domestic games being played across various age groups in the men's and women's category. The inter-state T20 tournaments added a semifinal stage after the super league stage. In August it was announced that Chandigarh cricket team will make their debut in the season after BCCI granted affiliation to Union Territory Cricket Association. Due to communication curfew after Revocation of the special status of Jammu and Kashmir, Jammu and Kashmir Cricket Association had to put TV advertisements on local TV channel to contact its players.

=== Transfers ===
The following players transfers and staff changes were held during the season.

Transfers

Name	From	To	Note	Ref
C. M. Gautam	Karnataka	Goa		
Arun Karthik	Kerala	Puducherry		
Vinay Kumar	Karnataka	Puducherry	Player-cum-mentor role	
K. B. Pawan	Nagaland	Mizoram		
Abrar Kazi	Nagaland	Mizoram		
Iqbal Abdullah	Mumbai	Sikkim		
Milind Kumar	Sikkim	Tripura		
Yashpal Singh	Manipur	Sikkim		
Bipul Sharma	Sikkim	Chandigarh		
Malolan Rangarajan	Uttarakhand	Tamil Nadu		
Robin Uthappa	Saurashtra	Kerala	Captain Role	
Stuart Binny	Karnataka	Nagaland		
Shrikant Mundhe	Maharashtra	Nagaland		
Yogesh Takawale	Maharashtra	Nagaland		
Dwaraka Ravi Teja	Andhra	Meghalaya		
Unmukt Chand	Delhi	Uttarakhand	Captain Role	
Tanmay Srivastava	Uttar Pradesh	Uttarakhand		
Rahil Shah	Tamil Nadu	Uttarakhand		
Barinder Sran	Punjab	Chandigarh		
Manan Vohra	Punjab	Chandigarh	Captain Role	
Uday Kaul	Punjab	Chandigarh		
Karn Sharma	Andhra	Railways		
T Pradeep	Karnataka	Railways		
Karthik Raman	Andhra	Railways		
Vikrant Rajput	Chhattisgarh	Railways		
Mangal Mahrour	Bihar	Railways		
Jiwanjot Singh	Punjab	Chhattisgarh		
Puneet Datey	Madhya Pradesh	Chhattisgarh		
Shashank Singh	Puducherry	Chhattisgarh		
Pulkit Narang	Delhi	Services		
Arpit Pannu	Punjab	Chandigarh		
Ankit Kaushik	Himachal Pradesh	Chandigarh		
Shresth Nirmohi	Himachal Pradesh	Chandigarh		
Gurinder Singh	Meghalaya	Chandigarh		
Vikas Yadav	Services	Bihar		
Rahul Dalal	Haryana	Arunachal Pradesh		
Devika Vaidya	Maharashtra women	Chhattisgarh women		
Staff changes
Divakar Vasu		Tamil Nadu	Appointed as Coach	
Vinayak Samant		Mumbai	Reappointed as Coach	
KP Bhaskar	Uttarakhand	Delhi	Appointed as Coach	
Gursharan Singh	Arunachal Pradesh	Uttarakhand	Appointed as Coach	
Sunil Joshi		Uttar Pradesh	Appointed as Coach	
Sanjeev Sharma		Arunachal Pradesh	Appointed as Coach	
Ajay Ratra		Assam	Appointed as Coach	
Sairaj Bahutule	Bengal	Gujarat	Appointed as Coach	
Sanath Kumar	Meghalaya	Baroda	Appointed as Coach	
V. R. V. Singh		Chandigarh	Appointed as Coach	

=== Men's ===
2019–20 India's Men's domestic cricket season
Ranji Trophy
- Champions: Saurashtra
- Runners-up: Bengal
- Most runs: Rahul Dalal (1,340)
- Most wickets: Jaydev Unadkat (67)

Duleep Trophy
- Champions: India Red
- Runners-up: India Green
- Most runs: Karun Nair (375)
- Most wickets: Akshay Wakhare (14)

Vijay Hazare Trophy
- Champions: Karnataka
- Runners-up: Tamil Nadu
- Most runs: Devdutt Padikkal (609)
- Most wickets: Pritam Das (23); Gaurav Yadav (23)

Deodhar Trophy
- Champions: India B
- Runners-up: India C
- Most runs: Baba Aparajith (167)
- Most wickets: Jalaj Saxena (10)

Syed Mushtaq Ali Trophy
- Champions: Karnataka
- Runners-up: Tamil Nadu
- Most runs: Devdutt Padikkal (580)
- Most wickets: Ravisrinivasan Sai Kishore (20)

Indian Premier League
- Champions: Mumbai Indians
- Runners-up: Delhi Capitals
- Most runs: (India) K. L. Rahul (670) (KXIP)
- Most wickets: (South Africa) Kagiso Rabada (30) (DC)

The men's season began in August with Duleep Trophy. India Red won the Duleep trophy, beating India Green by an innings and 38 runs in the final. The Vijay Hazare Trophy was played in September and October. Karnataka won the rain-affected final, beating Tamil Nadu by 60 runs to win the Vijay Hazare Trophy. The Deodhar Trophy was held in October and November. India B beat India C by 51 runs in the final to win the Deodhar Trophy. The Syed Mushtaq Ali Trophy is being held early in November and December to facilitate franchisees for the auction of Indian Premier League. The Ranji Trophy will start in December to February and will finish with knockouts being played in February and March 2020. Winner of Ranji Trophy will play Rest of India in a Best vs Rest format one-off match for Irani Cup in March. The men's season will end with the 13th season of IPL.

Dates	Tournament	Matches Format	Teams Format (No. of Teams)	Tournament format (No. of Matches)	Winners
17 August 2019- 8 September 2019	Duleep Trophy	First-class	Intra-national (3 Teams)	Round-robin and Finals (4 Matches)	India Red
24 September 2019- 25 October 2018	Vijay Hazare Trophy	List A	Inter-state (38 Teams)	Round-robin and Playoff format (169 Matches)	Karnataka
31 October 2019- 4 November 2019	Deodhar Trophy	List A	Intra-national (3 Teams)	Round-robin and Finals (4 Matches)	India B
8 November 2019- 1 December 2019	Syed Mushtaq Ali Trophy	Twenty20	Inter-state (38 Teams)	Round-robin and Playoff format (149 Matches)	Karnataka
9 December 2019- 13 March 2020	Ranji Trophy	First-class	Inter-state (38 Teams)	Round-robin and Playoff format (169 Matches)	Saurashtra
November 2020- November 2020	Irani Cup	First-class	State and Intra-national (2 Teams)	Single match (1 Match)	
19 September 2020- 10 November 2020	Indian Premier League	Twenty20	Inter-franchise (8 Teams)	Double Round-robin and Playoff format (60 Matches)	Mumbai Indians

=== Women's ===
2019–20 India's Women's domestic cricket season
T20 League
- Champions: Railways women
- Runners-up: Bengal women
- Most runs: Shafali Verma (265) (Har)
- Most wickets: Nupur Kohale (11) (Vid)

T20 Challenger Trophy
- Champions: India C Women
- Runners-up: India B Women
- Most runs: Shafali Verma (189) (Ind C)
- Most wickets: Rajeshwari Gayakwad (8) (Ind C)

Women's T20 Challenge
- Champions: IPL Trailblazers
- Runners-up: IPL Supernovas
- Most runs: (Sri Lanka) Chamari Atapattu (117) (Sup)
- Most wickets: (India) Radha Yadav (8) (Sup)

The women's season began with T20 League in October and November. Railways women defeated Bengal women by 8 wickets to win the T20 League for the record 9th time. It will be followed by T20 Challenger Trophy in January 2020. The One-Day League will be played in February and March. It will be followed by Challenger Trophy in March. The season will conclude with Women's T20 Challenge.

Dates	Tournament	Matches Format	Teams Format (No. of Teams)	Tournament format (No. of Matches)	Winners
14 October 2019- 10 November 2019	T20 League	Women's Twenty20	Inter-state (37 Teams)	Round-robin and Playoff format (142 Matches)	Railways women
4 January 2020- 11 January 2020	T20 Challenger; Trophy	Women's Twenty20	Intra-national (3 Teams)	Double Round-robin and Finals (7 Matches)	India C Women
18 February 2020- 20 March 2020	One-Day League	Women's List A	Inter-state (37 Teams)	Round-robin and Playoff format (160 Matches)	Knockout stage Cancelled
26 March 2020- 30 March 2020	Challenger Trophy	Women's List A	Intra-national (3 Teams)	Round-robin and Finals (4 Matches)	Cancelled
4 Nov 2020- 9 May 2020	Women's T20 Challenge	Women's Twenty20	Intra-national (3 Teams)	Round-robin and Finals (4 Matches)	IPL Trailblazers

== Junior Level ==
Contents
1 International Under-23 Men's	2 Domestic Men's							3 Domestic Women's						
1.1; Under-23; One-Day Series vs Bangladesh	2.1; Col C K Nayudu; Trophy	2.2; U23; One-Day; League	2.3; Vizzy; Trophy	2.4; Cooch; Behar; Trophy	2.5; Vinoo; Mankad; Trophy	2.6; U19; One-Day; Challenger; Trophy	2.7; Vijay; Merchant; Trophy	3.1; U23; One-Day; League	3.2; U23; One-Day; Challenger; Trophy	3.3; U23 T20; League	3.4; U23 T20; Challenger; Trophy	3.5; U19; One-Day; League	3.6; U19 T20; League	3.7; U19 T20; Challenger; Trophy

Similar to senior domestic schedule, the season retained all the tournaments and format of previous season across various age groups in the men's and women's category. Chandigarh will make its debut and were added to the Plate group (north zone for Vijay Merchant Trophy). Similar to Syed Mushtaq Ali Trophy, the women's inter-state T20 tournaments also added a semifinal stage after the super league stage.

=== International ===
Men's U-23 International tours
Dates	Tournament	Home team	Away team	Results [Matches]	
Dates	Tournament	Home team	Away team	FC	LA
19 September 2019- 27 September 2019	India Under-23 vs Bangladesh Under-23; One-Day Series	India U23	Bangladesh U23	—	3−1 [5]

==== Under-23 Men's One-Day Series vs Bangladesh ====
Bangladesh Under-23 cricket team in India in 2019
	India U23	Bangladesh U23
- Dates: 19 September – 27 September 2019
Captains	Priyam Garg	Saif Hassan

LA series
- Result: India U23 won the 5-match series 3–1
Most runs	Priyam Garg (168)	Saif Hassan (110)
Most wickets	Atit Sheth (8)	Abu Hider (8)

In September 2019, Bangladesh Under-23 cricket team toured India to play a five-match one-day series against India Under-23 cricket team. All the matches were played at the Ekana Cricket Stadium, Lucknow. Originally the series was scheduled to be held at Raipur but the venue was changed to Lucknow due to inclement weather conditions in Raipur. India Under-23 won the series 3−1.

Match	Date	Batting 1st	Batting 2nd	Result
1st One-Day	20 September 2019 (Note: Match was abandoned on originally scheduled day of 19 September and hence was played on reserve day of 20 September.)	India U23; 192/9 (50 overs)	Bangladesh U23; 158/9 (48.4 overs)	India U23 won by 34 Runs
2nd One-Day	21 September 2019	India U23; 212/7 (36 overs)	Bangladesh U23; 149/2 (36 overs)	Bangladesh U23 won by 5 Runs (DLS method)
3rd One-Day	23 September 2019	India U23; 114/0 (22 overs)	Bangladesh U23; 124 (21.4 overs)	India U23 won by 49 Runs (DLS method)
4th One-Day	25 September 2019	Bangladesh U23; 201/6 (50 overs)	India U23; 202/6 (42.2 overs)	India U23 won by 4 Wickets
5th One-Day	27 September 2019	India U23 vs Bangladesh U23		Match abandoned

=== Domestic Men's ===
Vinoo Mankad Trophy was held from October to November. Uttar Pradesh won the Vinoo Mankad Trophy. Vijay Merchant Trophy is being held from October to December. Men's U23 One-Day League is being held from October to December. Men's U19 One-Day Challenger Trophy is being held in November. Cooch Behar Trophy will be held from November to February. Col C K Nayudu Trophy will be held from December to March. Vizzy Trophy will be held in March.

During the season, BCCI also had to face serious issue of age fraud. In September 2019, former India captain and Junior team coach Rahul Dravid said that the issue is "Seriously detrimental" to the health of sport and "leads to an erosion of culture". BCCI relaxed the age fraud punishment during the second year of the punishment. Many BCCI member associations expressed shock over the decision. BCCI also started a 24x7 helpline for reporting the age fraud. Several players were suspended due to the age fraud.

2019-20 India's Junior Men's domestic cricket season
Col C K Nayudu Trophy (U-23)
- Champions: Vidarbha U-23
- Runners-up: Madhya Pradesh U-23

Men's U23 One-Day League (U-23)
- Champions: Bengal U-23 Men's
- Runners-up: Gujarat U-23 Men's

Cooch Behar Trophy (U-19)
- Champions: Baroda U-19 Men's
- Runners-up: Vidarbha U-19 Men's

Vinoo Mankad Trophy (U-19)
- Champions: Uttar Pradesh U-19 Men
- Runners-up: Mumbai U-19 Men
- Most runs: Kumar Kushagra (479)
- Most wickets: Manishi Singh (19)

Men's U19 One-Day Challenger Trophy (U-19)
- Champions: India A Men's
- Runners-up: India B Men's

Vijay Merchant Trophy (U-16)
- Champions: Mumbai U-16 Men's
- Runners-up: Punjab U-16 Men's

Dates	Tournament	Age-Group (Matches Format)	Teams Format (No. of Teams)	Tournament format (No. of Matches)	Winners
4 October 2019- 5 November 2019	Vinoo Mankad; Trophy	Men's U-19 (One-Day)	Inter-state (36 Teams)	Round-robin and Playoff format (152 Matches)	Uttar Pradesh; U-19 Men
11 October 2019- 19 December 2019	Vijay Merchant; Trophy	Men's U-16 (Multi-Day)	Inter-state (36 Teams)	Round-robin and Playoff format (102 Matches)	Mumbai U-16 Men's
31 October 2019- 1 December 2019	Men's U23 One-Day; League	Men's U-23 (One-Day)	Inter-state (36 Teams)	Round-robin and Playoff format (160 Matches)	Bengal U-23 Men's
11 November 2019- 17 November 2019	Men's U19 One-Day; Challenger Trophy	Men's U-19 (One-Day)	National and Intra-national (4 Teams)	Round-robin and Finals (8 Matches)	India A Men's
22 November 2019- 15 February 2020	Cooch Behar; Trophy	Men's U-19 (Multi-Day)	Inter-state (35 Teams)	Round-robin and Playoff format (143 Matches)	Baroda U-19 Men's
11 December 2019- 14 March 2020	Col C K Nayudu; Trophy	Men's U-23 (Multi-Day)	Inter-state (37 Teams)	Round-robin and Playoff format (160 Matches)	Vidarbha U-23
19 March 2020- 25 March 2020	Vizzy Trophy	Men's Inter-University (One-Day)	Inter-zonal (4 Teams)	Round-robin and Finals (7 Matches)	Cancelled

==== Men's Under-23 ====
The Under-23 age group will consist of Col C K Nayudu Trophy (Multi-day competition) and One-Day League.

===== Col C K Nayudu Trophy =====
Col C K Nayudu Trophy will begin on 11 December 2019. The league stage will run till 17 February 2020. The knockouts will run from 22 February to 14 March 2020. The tournament follows the group and knockout structure of Ranji Trophy.

===== Men's U23 One-Day League =====
Men's U23 One-Day League
- Dates: 31 October – 1 December 2019
- Cricket format: Men's U-23 One-day
- Participants: 36
- Matches: 160
- Official website: bcci.tv

Men's U23 One-Day League began on 31 October 2019. The league stage will run till 22 November 2019. The knockouts will run from 26 November to 1 December 2019. The tournament follows the group and knockout structure of Vijay Hazare Trophy.

====== League ======
Points table

Elite Group-A			Elite Group-B			Elite Group-C		Plate	
Pos	Team	Pts	Pos	Team	Pts	Team	Pts	Team	Pts
1	Punjab	0	2	Mumbai	0	Chhattisgarh	0	Assam	0
4	Maharashtra	0	3	Delhi	0	Odisha	0	Bihar	0
5	Vidarbha	0	6	Railways	0	Himachal	0	Nagaland	0
8	Karnataka	0	7	Andhra	0	Saurashtra	0	Manipur	0
9	Madhya Pradesh	0	10	Bengal	0	Haryana	0	Puducherry	0
12	Gujarat	0	11	Uttar Pradesh	0	Hyderabad	0	Arunachal Pradesh	0
13	Jammu & Kashmir	0	14	Rajasthan	0	Goa	0	Mizoram	0
16	Tamil Nadu	0	15	Kerala	0	Tripura	0	Sikkim	0
17	Baroda	0	18	Jharkhand	0	Uttarakhand	0	Meghalaya	0
								Chandigarh	0

- Top five teams across Groups A and B will advance to the knockout stage. Top two teams from Group C will advance to the knockout stage and will be promoted to Groups A and B for the next season. Top team from Plate Group will advance to the knockout stage and will be promoted to Group C for the next season.
- The lowest-ranked two teams across Groups A and B will be relegated to the Group C for the next season. The lowest-ranked team from Group C will be relegated to the Plate Group for the next season.

====== Quarter-finals ======
26 November 2019
Scorecard

AB1	v	P1

26 November 2019
Scorecard

AB2	v	C2

27 November 2019
Scorecard

AB3	v	C1

27 November 2019
Scorecard

AB4	v	AB5

====== Semi-finals ======
29 November 2019
Scorecard

Winner of QF-1	v	Winner of QF-4

29 November 2019
Scorecard

Winner of QF-2	v	Winner of QF-3

====== Final ======
1 December 2019
Scorecard

Winner of SF-1	v	Winner of SF-2

==== Men's Inter-University ====
The Inter-University competition will consist of sole Vizzy Trophy tournament (One-day competition).

===== Vizzy Trophy =====
Vizzy Trophy will be played from 19 March to 25 March 2020. In the tournament, the zonal teams will play a round-robin group stage followed by the final.

==== Men's Under-19 ====
The Under-19 age group will consist of Cooch Behar Trophy (Multi-day competition), Vinoo Mankad Trophy (One-day competition) and One-Day Challenger Trophy.

===== Cooch Behar Trophy =====
Cooch Behar Trophy will begin on 22 November 2019. The league stage will run till 20 January 2020. The knockouts will run from 26 January to 15 February 2020. The tournament follows the group and knockout structure of Ranji Trophy.

===== Vinoo Mankad Trophy =====
Vinoo Mankad Trophy
- Dates: 4 October – 5 November 2019
- Cricket format: Men's U-19 One-day
- Champions: Uttar Pradesh U-19 Men
- Runners-up: Mumbai U-19 Men
- Participants: 36
- Matches: 152
- Most runs: Kumar Kushagra (479)
- Most wickets: Manishi Singh (19)
- Official website: bcci.tv

Vinoo Mankad Trophy was stated to begin on 1 October 2019 but was changed to 4 October in the final schedule. The league stage ran till 26 October 2019. The knockouts ran from 31 October to 5 November 2019. The tournament followed the group and knockout structure of Vijay Hazare Trophy. Several cricketers from Bengal and Bihar were disqualified after caught of trying to do age fraud. Uttar Pradesh defeated Mumbai by 6 Wickets in the final to win the tournament.

====== League ======
Points table

Elite Group-A			Elite Group-B			Elite Group-C		Plate	
Pos	Team	Pts	Pos	Team	Pts	Team	Pts	Team	Pts
2	Madhya Pradesh	28	1	Uttar Pradesh	30	Baroda	28	Chandigarh	32
3	Mumbai	24	5	Karnataka	20	Saurashtra	18	Goa	30
4	Haryana	24	6	Delhi	20	Bihar	16	Uttarakhand	28
7	Tamil Nadu	20	8	Hyderabad	18	Himachal	14	Puducherry	22
10	Jharkhand	18	9	Punjab	16	Assam	12	Nagaland	20
11	Andhra	16	12	Gujarat	14	Kerala	12	Arunachal Pradesh	16
13	Vidarbha	12	14	Bengal	12	Jammu & Kashmir	10	Mizoram	12
16	Chhattisgarh	4	15	Rajasthan	12	Odisha	2	Sikkim	8
18	Maharashtra	0	17	Tripura	0			Meghalaya	8
								Manipur	4

- Top five teams across Groups A and B advanced to the knockout stage. Top two teams from Group C advanced to the knockout stage and were promoted to Groups A and B for the next season. Top team from Plate Group advanced to the knockout stage and were promoted to Group C for the next season.
- Bottom two teams across Groups A and B were relegated to the Group C for the next season. The bottom-ranked team from Group C were relegated to the Plate Group for the next season.

====== Quarter-finals ======
31 October 2019
Scorecard

Uttar Pradesh U-19 Men (AB1); 155 (41.5 overs)	v	Chandigarh U-19 Men (P1); 131 (44.4 overs)

Uttar Pradesh U-19 Men won by 24 Runs
Daly College Ground, Indore

31 October 2019
Scorecard

Saurashtra U-19 Men (C2); 277/6 (50 overs)	v	Madhya Pradesh U-19 Men (AB2); 105/3 (22.4 overs)

Saurashtra U-19 Men won by 24 Runs (VJD Method)
Emerald High School Ground, Indore

1 November 2019
Scorecard

Mumbai U-19 Men (AB3); 136 (36.4 overs)	v	Baroda U-19 Men (C1); 86 (31.2 overs)

Mumbai U-19 Men won by 50 Runs
Daly College Ground, Indore

1 November 2019
Scorecard

Haryana U-19 Men (AB4); 196/4 (23 overs)	v	Karnataka U-19 Men (AB5); 139 (19.2 overs)

Haryana U-19 Men won by 57 Runs
Emerald High School Ground, Indore

====== Semi-finals ======
3 November 2019
Scorecard

Uttar Pradesh U-19 Men (AB1); 132/9 (40 overs)	v	Haryana U-19 Men (AB4)

No Result (Uttar Pradesh U-19 Men qualified on the basis of more wins in the tournament)
Daly College Ground, Indore

3 November 2019
Scorecard

Mumbai U-19 Men (AB3); 12/1 (2 overs)	v	Saurashtra U-19 Men (C2)

No Result (Mumbai U-19 Men qualified on the basis of more wins in the tournament)
Emerald High School Ground, Indore

====== Final ======
5 November 2019
Scorecard

Mumbai U-19 Men (AB3); 195 (48.5 overs)	v	Uttar Pradesh U-19 Men (AB1); 198/4 (43.5 overs)

Uttar Pradesh won by 6 Wickets
Daly College Ground, Indore

===== Men's U19 One-Day Challenger Trophy =====
Men's U19 One-Day Challenger Trophy
- Dates: 11 – 17 November 2019
- Cricket format: U-19 One-day
- Participants: 4
- Matches: 8
- Official website: bcci.tv

Men's U19 One-Day Challenger Trophy is being played from 11 to 17 November 2019 at Hyderabad. The tournament was initially scheduled to be held from 9 to 15 November 2019. The tournament group stage will be round-robin followed by the final. A third-position play-off match was also added to the tournament. Nepal A under-19 team marked the comeback of an international team in the tournament after being absent last season. Nepal A Under-19 team replaced India Green Under-19. India Red, Blue and Yellow Under-19 teams were replaced by India-A, B & C Under-19 teams respectively.

====== League ======
Team	P	W	L	T	NR	Pts	NRR
India A U-19 Men	0	0	0	0	0	0	±0.000
India B U-19 Men	0	0	0	0	0	0	±0.000
India C U-19 Men	0	0	0	0	0	0	±0.000
Nepal A U-19 Men	0	0	0	0	0	0	±0.000

Top two teams advanced to the final

===== Third place play-off =====
17 November 2019
Scorecard

3rd Position	v	4th Position

Gymkhana Ground, Secunderabad

====== Final ======
17 November 2019
Scorecard

1st Position	v	2nd Position

Rajiv Gandhi International Cricket Stadium, Hyderabad

==== Men's Under-16 ====
The Under-16 age group will consist of sole Vijay Merchant Trophy tournament (multi-day competition).

===== Vijay Merchant Trophy =====
Vijay Merchant Trophy
- Dates: 11 October – 19 December 2019
- Cricket format: Men's U-16 Multi-Day
- Participants: 36
- Matches: 102
- Official website: bcci.tv

Vijay Merchant Trophy began on 11 October 2019. The league stage will run till 20 November 2019. The knockouts will run from 25 November to 19 December 2019. In the tournament's league stage, the teams compete in round-robin groups (based on Zonal Basis). The top two teams from each group will play in the knockouts. Several cricketers from Mumbai and Kerala were disqualified after they failed the age fraud test. Meghalaya's Nirdesh Baisoya took all 10 wickets in an innings in a league stage match against Nagaland.

====== League ======
Points table

Central Zone		East Zone		North Zone		North-East Zone		South Zone		West Zone	
Team	Pts	Team	Pts	Team	Pts	Team	Pts	Team	Pts	Team	Pts
Uttar Pradesh	0	Bengal	0	Haryana	0	Meghalaya	0	Tamil Nadu	0	Mumbai	0
Madhya Pradesh	0	Jharkhand	0	Delhi	0	Nagaland	0	Karnataka	0	Maharashtra	0
Vidarbha	0	Odisha	0	Punjab	0	Manipur	0	Andhra	0	Saurashtra	0
Chhattisgarh	0	Bihar	0	Himachal	0	Mizoram	0	Kerala	0	Gujarat	0
Rajasthan	0	Tripura	0	Jammu & Kashmir	0	Arunachal Pradesh	0	Hyderabad	0	Baroda	0
Uttarakhand	0	Assam	0	Chandigarh	0	Sikkim	0	Puducherry	0		
								Goa	0		

- Top 2 teams from each group advanced to the knockout stage.

====== Pre-Quarter-finals ======
25–28 November 2019
Scorecard

v

25–28 November 2019
Scorecard

v

25–28 November 2019
Scorecard

v	North-East 1

25–28 November 2019
Scorecard

v	North-East 2

====== Quarter-finals ======
2–5 December 2019
Scorecard

Draw 1	v	Winner Of PQF1

2–5 December 2019
Scorecard

Draw 2	v	Winner Of PQF2

2–5 December 2019
Scorecard

Draw 3	v	Winner Of PQF3

2–5 December 2019
Scorecard

Draw 4	v	Winner Of PQF4

====== Semi-finals ======
9–12 December 2019
Scorecard

Winner Of QF1	v	Winner Of QF4

9–12 December 2019
Scorecard

Winner Of QF2	v	Winner Of QF3

====== Final ======
16–19 December 2019
Scorecard

Winner Of SF1	v	Winner Of SF2

=== Domestic Women's ===
Women's U23 T20 League is being held from November to December. Women's U23 T20 Challenger Trophy will be held in December. Women's U23 One-Day League will be held from January to February. Women's U19 One-Day League will be held from February to March. Women's U23 One-Day Challenger Trophy will be held in March. Women's U19 T20 League will be held from March to April.Women's U19 T20 Challenger Trophy will be held in April. U19 T20 League and Challenger Trophy were initially scheduled to be held in October to November and November to December, respectively, but were rescheduled.

2019-20 India's Junior Women's domestic cricket season
Women's U23 T20 League
- Champions: Mumbai U23 women
- Runners-up: Jharkhand U23 women

Women's U23 T20 Challenger Trophy
- Champions: India B U23 women
- Runners-up: India C U23 women

Dates	Tournament	Age-Group (Matches Format)	Teams Format (No. of Teams)	Tournament format (No. of Matches)	Winners
12 November 2019- 5 December 2019	Women's U23; T20 League	Women's U-23 (Twenty20)	Inter-state (37 Teams)	Round-robin and Playoff format (142 Matches)	Mumbai U23
11 December 2019- 15 December 2019	Women's U23 T20; Challenger Trophy	Women's U-23 (Twenty20)	Intra-national (3 Teams)	Round-robin and Finals (4 Matches)	India B U23
24 January 2020- 29 March 2020	Women's U23; One-Day; League	Women's U-23 (One-Day)	Inter-state (37 Teams)	Round-robin and Playoff format (160 Matches)	Cancelled
19 February 2020- 21 March 2020	Women's U19; One-Day; League	Women's U-19 (One-Day)	Inter-state (36 Teams)	Round-robin and Playoff format (152 Matches)	Cancelled
3 April 2020- 7 April 2020	Women's U23; One-Day; Challenger Trophy	Women's U-23 (One-Day)	Intra-national (3 Teams)	Round-robin and Finals (4 Matches)	Cancelled
27 March 2020- 19 April 2020	Women's U19; T20 League	Women's U-19 (Twenty20)	Inter-state (36 Teams)	Round-robin and Playoff format (135 Matches)	Cancelled
24 April 2020- 27 April 2020	Women's U19 T20; Challenger Trophy	Women's U-19 (Twenty20)	Intra-national (3 Teams)	Round-robin and Finals (4 Matches)	Cancelled

==== Under-23 ====
The Under-23 age group will consist of One-Day League, One-Day Challenger Trophy, T20 League and T20 Challenger Trophy.

===== Women's U23 One-Day League =====
Women's U23 One-Day League will begin on 24 January 2020. The league stage will run till 15 February 2020. The knockouts will run from 19 February to 24 February 2020. The tournament follows the group and knockout structure of Vijay Hazare Trophy.

===== Women's U23 One-Day Challenger Trophy =====
Women's U23 One-Day Challenger Trophy will be played from 1 to 5 March 2020. The tournament group stage will be round-robin followed by the final.

===== Women's U23 T20 League =====
Women's U23 T20 League
- Dates: 12 November – 5 December 2019
- Cricket format: Women's U-23 T20
- Participants: 37
- Matches: 142
- Official website: bcci.tv

Women's U23 T20 League began on 12 November 2019. The league stage will run till 21 November. The super league stage will be played from 25 November to 1 December. The knockouts will be played from 3 to 5 December 2019. The tournament follows the group, super league and knockout structure of Syed Mushtaq Ali Trophy. Before the start of tournament, Bengal's selectors met with a road accident while going for the selection trial for the tournament.

====== League ======
Points table

Group A		Group B		Group C		Group D		Group E	
Team	Pts	Team	Pts	Team	Pts	Team	Pts	Team	Pts
Railways	0	Vidarbha	0	Baroda	0	Bengal	0	Mumbai	0
Delhi	0	Punjab	0	Gujarat	0	Odisha	0	Maharashtra	0
Kerala	0	Madhya Pradesh	0	Jharkhand	0	Himachal Pradesh	0	Rajasthan	0
Assam	0	Uttar Pradesh	0	Haryana	0	Andhra	0	Hyderabad	0
Tripura	0	Karnataka	0	Saurashtra	0	Goa	0	Puducherry	0
Uttarakhand	0	Jammu & Kashmir	0	Nagaland	0	Chhattisgarh	0	Tamil Nadu	0
Bihar	0	Meghalaya	0	Manipur	0	Arunachal Pradesh	0	Sikkim	0
						Chandigarh	0	Mizoram	0

- Top 2 teams from each group advances to the Super League.

====== Super League ======
Points table

Super Group-A

Team	P	W	L	T	NR	Pts	NRR
A1	0	0	0	0	0	0	±0.000
B2	0	0	0	0	0	0	±0.000
C1	0	0	0	0	0	0	±0.000
D2	0	0	0	0	0	0	±0.000
E1	0	0	0	0	0	0	±0.000

Super Group-B

Team	P	W	L	T	NR	Pts	NRR
A2	0	0	0	0	0	0	±0.000
B1	0	0	0	0	0	0	±0.000
C2	0	0	0	0	0	0	±0.000
D1	0	0	0	0	0	0	±0.000
E2	0	0	0	0	0	0	±0.000

- Top 2 teams from both the groups advances to the semi-finals.

====== Semi-finals ======
3 December 2019
Scorecard

SL Group A1	v	SL Group B2

SLIMS Cricket Ground, Puducherry

3 December 2019
Scorecard

SL Group A2	v	SL Group B1

SLIMS Cricket Ground, Puducherry

====== Final ======
5 December 2019
Scorecard

Winner of SF1	v	Winner of SF2

SLIMS Cricket Ground, Puducherry

===== Women's U23 T20 Challenger Trophy =====
Women's U23 T20 Challenger Trophy will be played from 11 to 15 December 2019. The tournament group stage will be round-robin followed by the final.

==== Under-19 ====
The Under-19 age group will consist of One-Day League, T20 League and T20 Challenger Trophy.

===== Women's U19 One-Day League =====
Women's U19 One-Day League will begin on 19 February 2020. The league stage will run till 12 March 2020. The knockouts will run from 16 to 21 March 2020. The tournament follows the group and knockout structure of Vijay Hazare Trophy.

===== Women's U19 T20 League =====
Women's U19 T20 League will begin on 27 March to 19 April 2020. It was initially scheduled to be held from 31 October to 23 November 2019 but was rescheduled. The tournament follows the group, super league and knockout structure of Syed Mushtaq Ali Trophy.

===== Women's U19 T20 Challenger Trophy =====
Women's U19 T20 Challenger Trophy will be played from 24 to 27 April 2020. It was initially scheduled to be held from 28 November to 2 December 2019 but was rescheduled. The tournament group stage will be round-robin followed by the final.
