= Harry Funnell =

English cricketer (born 1999)

Personal information
- Full name: James Harry Funnell
- Born: 31 May 1999 (age 27); Leicester, England
- Batting: Left-handed
- Bowling: Right-arm medium

Domestic team information
- Years: Team
- 2018: Leicestershire
- Only LA: 19 June 2018 Leicestershire v India A

Career statistics
Competition	List A
Matches	1
Runs scored	1
Batting average	–
100s/50s	0/0
Top score	1*
Balls bowled	42
Wickets	1
Bowling average	67.00
5 wickets in innings	0
10 wickets in match	0
Best bowling	1/67
Catches/stumpings	0/–
- Source: Cricinfo, 29 September 2018

James Harry Funnell (born 31 May 1999) is an English cricketer. He made his List A debut for Leicestershire against India A in a tri-series warm-up match on 19 June 2018.
