= List of international cricket centuries by Virat Kohli =

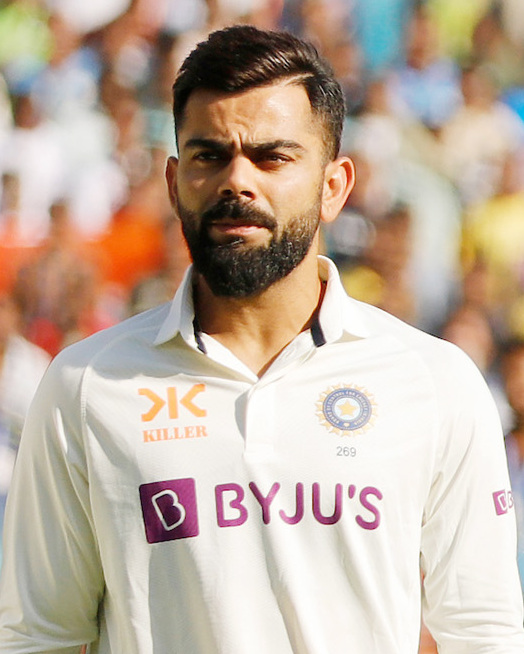
Virat Kohli has scored 86 centuries in international cricket.

Virat Kohli (born 5 November 1988) is an Indian cricketer and a former captain of the Indian national cricket team. A right-handed top-order batsman, he has made 86 centuries in international cricket—30 in Test cricket, 55 in One Day Internationals (ODIs) and 1 in Twenty20 Internationals (T20Is). (Note: Kohli is second on the all-time list, only behind Sachin Tendulkar with 100 centuries.)

Kohli made his debut against Sri Lanka in August 2008, and scored his first century the following year when he made 107 against the same team at Eden Gardens, Kolkata. His 86-ball 133 not out against Sri Lanka in February 2012 led India to the second highest run-chase by any team in Australia. (Note: India reached their target of 321 runs in 36.4 overs.) Former Australian cricketer Dean Jones described the innings as "one of the greatest ODI knocks of all time". Kohli's highest score of 183 came against Pakistan during the 2012 Asia Cup; India successfully chased a target of 330 set by Pakistan and Kohli was adjudged man of the match. Following that, he made his first century as a captain while playing against the West Indies in the 2013 Triangular Series. In the bilateral series against Australia in October 2013, Kohli made two centuries in successful run-chases. The first of the two, 100 not out, was scored off 52 balls and remains the fastest ODI century by an Indian. The next century, which was scored off 61 balls, remains the third-fastest by an Indian as of September 2019. In November 2023, he went past Sachin Tendulkar's record for most ODI centuries when he made his 50th century in the format; he scored 117 against New Zealand in the 2023 Cricket World Cup semi-final.

Kohli made his Test debut against the West Indies in 2011 and scored his first century in the format during the Australian tour in January 2012. In the first Test of the 2014–15 Border–Gavaskar Trophy, he became the fourth Indian player to score centuries in both innings of a Test match after making 115 and 141. (Note: He is the second player to achieve this feat on captaincy debut; the first being Greg Chappell.) He was appointed as the captain of the Test team during the series and became the first player to score centuries in each of his first three Test innings as captain. In 2016, Kohli became the fifth player to score three or more double centuries in a calendar year. (Note: The feat was previously achieved by Don Bradman (in 1930), Ricky Ponting (in 2003) and Brendon McCullum (in 2014).) The following year, he repeated the feat and also became the first batsman to score four double centuries in consecutive Test series. His seven double centuries is the joint fourth-most by a player. (Note: His seven double-centuries are the most by a captain.) In 2017, he became the first captain to score eleven centuries in a calendar year.The following year, in 2018, he repeated this feat with eleven centuries, second-most in a calendar year to Tendulkar. In 2019, Kohli scored seven centuries which included five ODI-centuries. Moreover, he scored his highest score in Test-cricket against South Africa. In December 2022, Kohli scored a hundred against Bangladesh in the third ODI to surpass Ricky Ponting's total of 71 centuries in international cricket.

Kohli scored his only T20I hundred against Afghanistan at the 2022 Asia Cup. (Note: The century was scored after 1,021 days from his previous hundred) The following year, he scored 186 against Australia in the first innings of the fourth Test. (Note: It was his first Test century in over three years.) He would score another century in the third innings of the first Test against Australia in November 2024; this would turn out to be his last Test century due to his retirement from the format in May 2025.

== Key ==
Symbol	Meaning
*	Remained not out
†	Man of the match
‡	Captained the Indian cricket team
Balls	Balls faced
Pos.	Position in the batting order
Inn.	The innings of the match
S/R	Strike rate during the innings
H/A/N	Venue was at home (India), away or neutral
Date	Match starting day
Lost	The match was lost by India
Won	The match was won by India
Drawn	The match was drawn
(D/L)	The result of the match was based upon the Duckworth–Lewis method

== Test Cricket Centuries ==
Test centuries scored by Virat Kohli
No.	Runs	Against	Pos.	Inn.	Test	Venue	H/A	Date	Result	Ref
1	116	Australia	6	2	4/4	Adelaide Oval, Adelaide	Away	24 January 2012	Lost	
2	103 †	New Zealand	5	2	2/2	M. Chinnaswamy Stadium, Bangalore	Home	31 August 2012	Won	
3	103	England	5	2	4/4	Vidarbha Cricket Association Stadium, Nagpur	Home	13 December 2012	Drawn	
4	107	Australia	5	2	1/4	M. A. Chidambaram Stadium, Chennai	Home	22 February 2013	Won	
5	119 †	South Africa	4	1	1/2	Wanderers Stadium, Johannesburg	Away	18 December 2013	Drawn	
6	105*	New Zealand	4	4	2/2	Basin Reserve, Wellington	Away	14 February 2014	Drawn	
7	115 ‡	Australia	4	2	1/4	Adelaide Oval, Adelaide	Away	9 December 2014	Lost	
8	141 ‡	Australia	4	4	1/4	Adelaide Oval, Adelaide	Away	9 December 2014	Lost	
9	169	Australia	4	2	3/4	Melbourne Cricket Ground, Melbourne	Away	26 December 2014	Drawn	
10	147 ‡	Australia	4	2	4/4	Sydney Cricket Ground, Sydney	Away	6 January 2015	Drawn	
11	103 ‡	Sri Lanka	4	2	1/3	Galle International Stadium, Galle	Away	12 August 2015	Lost	
12	200 ‡	West Indies	4	1	1/4	Sir Vivian Richards Stadium, Antigua	Away	21 July 2016	Won	
13	211 ‡	New Zealand	4	1	3/3	Holkar Stadium, Indore	Home	8 October 2016	Won	
14	167 † ‡	England	4	1	2/5	ACA-VDCA Cricket Stadium, Visakhapatnam	Home	17 November 2016	Won	
15	235 † ‡	England	4	2	4/5	Wankhede Stadium, Mumbai	Home	8 December 2016	Won	
16	204 † ‡	Bangladesh	4	1	1/1	Rajiv Gandhi Stadium, Hyderabad	Home	9 February 2017	Won	
17	103* ‡	Sri Lanka	4	3	1/3	Galle International Stadium, Galle	Away	26 July 2017	Won	
18	104* ‡	Sri Lanka	4	3	1/3	Eden Gardens, Kolkata	Home	16 November 2017	Drawn	
19	213 † ‡	Sri Lanka	4	2	2/3	Vidarbha Cricket Association Stadium, Nagpur	Home	24 November 2017	Won	
20	243 † ‡	Sri Lanka	4	1	3/3	Feroz Shah Kotla Ground, Delhi	Home	2 December 2017	Drawn	
21	153 ‡	South Africa	4	2	2/3	SuperSport Park, Centurion	Away	13 January 2018	Lost	
22	149 ‡	England	4	2	1/5	Edgbaston, Birmingham	Away	1 August 2018	Lost	
23	103 † ‡	England	4	3	3/5	Trent Bridge, Nottingham	Away	18 August 2018	Won	
24	139 ‡	West Indies	4	1	1/2	Saurashtra Cricket Association Stadium, Rajkot	Home	4 October 2018	Won	
25	123 ‡	Australia	4	2	2/4	Perth Stadium, Perth	Away	14 December 2018	Lost	
26	254* † ‡	South Africa	4	1	2/3	Maharashtra Cricket Association Stadium, Pune	Home	10 October 2019	Won	
27	136 ‡	Bangladesh	4	2	2/2	Eden Gardens, Kolkata	Home	22 November 2019	Won	
28	186 †	Australia	4	2	4/4	Narendra Modi Stadium, Ahmedabad	Home	9 March 2023	Drawn	
29	121	West Indies	4	1	2/2	Queen's Park Oval, Port of Spain	Away	20 July 2023	Drawn	
30	100*	Australia	4	3	1/5	Perth Stadium, Perth	Away	22 November 2024	Won	

== One Day International centuries ==
ODI centuries scored by Virat Kohli
No.	Runs	Against	Pos.	Inn.	S/R	Venue	H/A/N	Date	Result	Ref
1	107	Sri Lanka	4	2	93.85	Eden Gardens, Kolkata	Home	24 December 2009	Won	
2	102* †	Bangladesh	3	2	107.37	Sher-e-Bangla Stadium, Dhaka	Away	11 January 2010	Won	
3	118 †	Australia	3	2	97.52	ACA–VDCA Cricket Stadium, Visakhapatnam	Home	20 October 2010	Won	
4	105 †	New Zealand	3	1	100.96	Nehru Stadium, Guwahati	Home	28 November 2010	Won	
5	100*	Bangladesh	4	1	120.48	Sher-e-Bangla Stadium, Dhaka	Away	19 February 2011	Won	
6	107	England	4	1	115.05	Sophia Gardens, Cardiff	Away	16 September 2011	Lost (D/L)	
7	112* †	England	4	2	114.28	Feroz Shah Kotla Ground, Delhi	Home	17 October 2011	Won	
8	117 †	West Indies	4	2	95.12	ACA–VDCA Cricket Stadium, Visakhapatnam	Home	2 December 2011	Won	
9	133* †	Sri Lanka	4	2	154.65	Bellerive Oval, Hobart	Neutral	28 February 2012	Won	
10	108 †	Sri Lanka	3	1	90.00	Sher-e-Bangla Stadium, Dhaka	Neutral	13 March 2012	Won	
11	183 †	Pakistan	3	2	123.64	Sher-e-Bangla Stadium, Dhaka	Neutral	18 March 2012	Won	
12	106 †	Sri Lanka	3	1	93.80	MRIC Stadium, Hambantota	Away	21 July 2012	Won	
13	128*†	Sri Lanka	3	2	107.56	R. Premadasa Stadium, Colombo	Away	31 July 2012	Won	
14	102 † ‡	West Indies	3	1	122.89	Queen's Park Oval, Port of Spain	Away	5 July 2013	Won (D/L)	
15	115 † ‡	Zimbabwe	3	2	106.48	Harare Sports Club, Harare	Away	24 July 2013	Won	
16	100*	Australia	3	2	192.30	Sawai Mansingh Stadium, Jaipur	Home	16 October 2013	Won	
17	115* †	Australia	3	2	174.24	VCA Stadium, Nagpur	Home	30 October 2013	Won	
18	123	New Zealand	3	2	110.81	McLean Park, Napier	Away	19 January 2014	Lost	
19	136 † ‡	Bangladesh	3	2	111.47	Khan Shaheb Osman Ali Stadium, Fatullah	Away	26 February 2014	Won	
20	127 †	West Indies	3	1	111.40	HPCA Stadium, Dharamshala	Home	17 October 2014	Won	
21	139* ‡	Sri Lanka	4	2	110.31	JSCA Stadium, Ranchi	Home	16 November 2014	Won	
22	107 †	Pakistan	3	1	84.90	Adelaide Oval, Adelaide	Neutral	15 February 2015	Won	
23	138 †	South Africa	3	1	98.57	M. A. Chidambaram Stadium, Chennai	Home	22 October 2015	Won	
24	117	Australia	3	1	100.00	Melbourne Cricket Ground, Melbourne	Away	17 January 2016	Lost	
25	106	Australia	3	2	115.21	Manuka Oval, Canberra	Away	20 January 2016	Lost	
26	154* †	New Zealand	3	2	114.92	IS Bindra Stadium, Mohali	Home	23 October 2016	Won	
27	122 ‡	England	3	2	116.19	Maharashtra Cricket Association Stadium, Pune	Home	15 January 2017	Won	
28	111* † ‡	West Indies	3	2	96.52	Sabina Park, Kingston	Away	6 July 2017	Won	
29	131 † ‡	Sri Lanka	3	1	136.45	R. Premadasa Stadium, Colombo	Away	31 August 2017	Won	
30	110* ‡	Sri Lanka	3	2	94.82	R. Premadasa Stadium, Colombo	Away	3 September 2017	Won	
31	121 ‡	New Zealand	3	1	96.80	Wankhede Stadium, Mumbai	Home	22 October 2017	Lost	
32	113 ‡	New Zealand	3	1	106.60	Green Park Stadium, Kanpur	Home	29 October 2017	Won	
33	112 † ‡	South Africa	3	2	94.11	Kingsmead Cricket Ground, Durban	Away	1 February 2018	Won	
34	160* † ‡	South Africa	3	1	100.62	Newlands Cricket Ground, Cape Town	Away	7 February 2018	Won	
35	129* † ‡	South Africa	3	2	134.37	SuperSport Park, Centurion	Away	16 February 2018	Won	
36	140 † ‡	West Indies	3	2	130.84	ACA Stadium, Guwahati	Home	21 October 2018	Won	
37	157* † ‡	West Indies	3	1	121.71	ACA–VDCA Cricket Stadium, Visakhapatnam	Home	24 October 2018	Tied	
38	107 ‡	West Indies	3	2	89.91	Maharashtra Cricket Association Stadium, Pune	Home	27 October 2018	Lost	
39	104 † ‡	Australia	3	2	92.85	Adelaide Oval, Adelaide	Away	15 January 2019	Won	
40	116 † ‡	Australia	3	1	96.67	Vidarbha Cricket Association Stadium, Nagpur	Home	5 March 2019	Won	
41	123 ‡	Australia	3	2	129.47	JSCA Stadium, Ranchi	Home	8 March 2019	Lost	
42	120 † ‡	West Indies	3	1	96.00	Queen's Park Oval, Port of Spain	Away	11 August 2019	Won	
43	114* † ‡	West Indies	3	2	115.15	Queen's Park Oval, Port of Spain	Away	14 August 2019	Won	
44	113	Bangladesh	3	1	124.17	Zohur Ahmed Chowdhury Stadium, Chittagong	Away	10 December 2022	Won	
45	113 †	Sri Lanka	3	1	129.88	ACA Stadium, Guwahati	Home	10 January 2023	Won	
46	166* †	Sri Lanka	3	1	150.90	Greenfield International Stadium, Thiruvananthapuram	Home	15 January 2023	Won	
47	122* †	Pakistan	3	1	129.78	R. Premadasa Stadium, Colombo	Neutral	10 September 2023	Won	
48	103* †	Bangladesh	3	2	106.18	Maharashtra Cricket Association Stadium, Pune	Home	19 October 2023	Won	
49	101* †	South Africa	3	1	83.47	Eden Gardens, Kolkata	Home	5 November 2023	Won	
50	117	New Zealand	3	1	103.53	Wankhede Stadium, Mumbai	Home	15 November 2023	Won	
51	100* †	Pakistan	3	2	90.09	Dubai International Cricket Stadium, Dubai	Neutral	23 February 2025	Won	
52	135 †	South Africa	3	1	112.50	JSCA International Stadium Complex, Ranchi	Home	30 November 2025	Won	
53	102	South Africa	3	1	109.68	Shaheed Veer Narayan Singh International Cricket Stadium, Nava Raipur	Home	3 December 2025	Lost	
54	124	New Zealand	3	2	114.81	Holkar Stadium, Indore	Home	18 January 2026	Lost	
55	139*	West Indies	3	2	157.95	Greenfield International Stadium, Thiruvananthapuram	Home	27 September 2026	Won	

== Twenty20 International centuries ==
T20I centuries scored by Virat Kohli
No.	Runs	Against	Pos.	Inn.	S/R	Venue	H/A/N	Date	Result	Ref
1	122* †	Afghanistan	2	1	200.00	Dubai International Cricket Stadium, Dubai	Neutral	8 September 2022	Won	

== Team wise record ==
Centuries against different nations
Opponent	Test	ODI	T20I	Total
Afghanistan	–	–	1	1
Australia	9	8	–	17
Bangladesh	2	5	–	7
England	5	3	–	8
New Zealand	3	7	–	10
Pakistan	–	4	–	4
South Africa	3	7	–	10
Sri Lanka	5	10	–	15
West Indies	3	10	–	13
Zimbabwe	–	1	–	1
Total	30	55	1	86

== Bibliography ==
- Memon, Ayaz; Rao, C. Rajshekar (2013). Virat Kohli: Reliable Rebel. Jaico Publishing House. ISBN 978-81-8495-524-8.
