= South African A cricket team in India in 2019 =

Cricket tournament

	India	South Africa
- Dates: 29 August – 20 September 2019
Captains	Shubman Gill (1st FC); Wriddhiman Saha(2nd FC); Manish Pandey(1st, 2nd and 3rd LAs); Shreyas Iyer(4th and 5th LAs)	Aiden Markram (FCs); Temba Bavuma (LAs)

FC series
- Result: India won the 2-match series 1–0
Most runs	Shubman Gill (187)	Wiaan Mulder (198)
Most wickets	Shahbaz Nadeem (8)	Dane Piedt (9)

LA series
- Result: India won the 5-match series 4–1
Most runs	Shivam Dube (155)	Reeza Hendricks (239)
Most wickets	Yuzvendra Chahal (7)	Anrich Nortje (7)

The South Africa A cricket team toured India from August till September 2019 to play 2 First-class matches and 5 List-A matches.

India A won the unofficial One-Day series 4–1. They also won the unofficial Test series 1–0.

== Squads ==
First-class		List-A	
India A	South Africa A	India A	South Africa A
Shubman Gill (c, 1st FC); Wriddhiman Saha (c, wk) (2nd FC); Ruturaj Gaikwad; Anmolpreet Singh; Ricky Bhui; Ankit Bawne; K. S. Bharat (wk); Krishnappa Gowtham; Shahbaz Nadeem; Shardul Thakur; Mohammed Siraj; Tushar Deshpande; Shivam Dube; Vijay Shankar; Priyank Panchal; Abhimanyu Easwaran; Karun Nair; Kuldeep Yadav; Umesh Yadav; Avesh Khan; Jalaj Saxena	Aiden Markram (c); Temba Bavuma; Theunis de Bruyn; Beuran Hendricks; George Linde; Pieter Malan; Edward Moore; Wiaan Mulder; Senuran Muthusamy; Anrich Nortje; Dane Piedt; Rudi Second; Lutho Sipamla; Khaya Zondo; Zubayr Hamza; Heinrich Klaasen (wk)	Manish Pandey (c) (1st, 2nd and 3rd LAs); Shreyas Iyer (c) (4th and 5th LAs); Ruturaj Gaikwad; Shubman Gill; Anmolpreet Singh; Ricky Bhui; Ishan Kishan (wk); Vijay Shankar; Shivam Dube; Krunal Pandya; Axar Patel; Yuzvendra Chahal; Shardul Thakur; Deepak Chahar; Khaleel Ahmed; Nitish Rana; Shubman Gill; Prashant Chopra; Anmolpreet Singh; Ricky Bhui; Sanju Samson (wk); Washington Sundar; Rahul Chahar; Tushar Deshpande; Ishan Porel; Shikhar Dhawan	Temba Bavuma (c); Matthew Breetzke; Gihahn Cloete; Junior Dala; Theunis de Bruyn; Bjorn Fortuin; Beuran Hendricks; Reeza Hendricks; Heinrich Klaasen (wk); George Linde; Janneman Malan; Wiaan Mulder; Anrich Nortje; Sinethemba Qeshile; Lutho Sipamla

== List-A series ==
=== 1st Unofficial ODI ===
29 August 2019
09:00
Scorecard

India A 327/6 (47 overs)	v	South Africa A 258 (45 overs)
Shivam Dube 79* (60); Bjorn Fortuin 2/40 (10 overs)		Reeza Hendricks 110 (108); Yuzvendra Chahal 5/47 (10 overs)

India A won by 69 runs
Greenfield International Stadium, Thiruvananthapuram
Umpires: Abhijit Deshmukh and Rohan Pandit
Player of the match: Axar Patel (India A)

- South Africa A won the toss and elected to field.
- Match was reduced to 47 overs per side due to rain.

=== 2nd Unofficial ODI ===
31 August 2019
09:00
Scorecard

South Africa A 162/5 (21 overs)	v	India A 163/8 (20 overs)
George Linde 52* (25); Axar Patel 1/19 (3 overs)		Ishan Kishan 55 (24); Junior Dala 2/25 (3 overs)

India A won by 2 wickets
Greenfield International Stadium, Thiruvananthapuram
Umpires: Abhijit Deshmukh and Virender Sharma
Player of the match: Ishan Kishan (India A)

- India A won the toss and elected to field.
- Match was reduced to 21 overs per side due to rain.

=== 3rd Unofficial ODI ===
2 September 2019
09:00
Scorecard

South Africa A 207/8 (30 overs)	v	India A 208/6 (27.5 overs)
Heinrich Klaasen 44 (21); Krunal Pandya 2/23 (5 overs)		Manish Pandey 81 (59); George Linde 2/41 (5 overs) and Anrich Nortje 2/41 (5.5 overs)

India A won by 4 wickets
Greenfield International Stadium, Thiruvananthapuram
Umpires: Rohan Pandit and Virender Sharma
Player of the match: Manish Pandey (India A)

- South Africa A won the toss and elected to bat.
- Match was reduced to 30 overs per side due to rain.

=== 4th Unofficial ODI ===
4–5 September 2019
09:00
Scorecard

South Africa A 137/1 (25 overs)	v	India A 188/9 (25 overs)
Reeza Hendricks 60* (70); Rahul Chahar 1/18 (5 overs)		Shikhar Dhawan 52 (43); Anrich Nortje 3/36 (5 overs)

South Africa A won by 4 runs (DLS method)
Greenfield International Stadium, Thiruvananthapuram
Umpires: Abhijit Deshmukh and Rohan Pandit
Player of the match: Anrich Nortje (South Africa A)

- India A won the toss and elected to field.
- Match was reduced to 47 overs per side due to rain. Rain again interrupted in the 22nd over of South Africa A's innings and the match was reduced to 25 overs. India A were set a revised target of 193 runs from 25 overs due to rain. Due to persistent rain, the match was suspended in the eighth over of India A's innings, and continued on 5 September.

=== 5th Unofficial ODI ===
6 September 2019
09:00
Scorecard

India A 204/4 (20 overs)	v	South Africa A 168 (20 overs)
Sanju Samson 91 (48); Beuran Hendricks 2/29 (4 overs)		Reeza Hendricks 59 (43); Shardul Thakur 3/9 (3 overs)

India A won by 36 runs
Greenfield International Stadium, Thiruvananthapuram
Umpires: Abhijit Deshmukh and Virender Sharma
Player of the match: Sanju Samson (India A)

- India A won the toss and elected to bat.
- Match was reduced to 20 overs per side due to rain.

== First-Class series ==
=== 1st Unofficial Test ===
9–12 September 2019
Scorecard

South Africa A	v	India A
164 (51.5 overs); Marco Jansen 45* (69); Shardul Thakur 3/29 (12 overs)		303 (87.5 overs); Shubman Gill 90 (13); Lungi Ngidi 3/50 (16 overs)
186 (58.5 overs); Heinrich Klaasen 48 (104); Shahbaz Nadeem 3/21 (16 overs)		49/3 (9.4 overs); Ricky Bhui 20 (26); Lungi Ngidi 2/22 (5 overs)

India A won by 7 wickets
Greenfield International Stadium, Thiruvananthapuram
Umpires: Ulhas Gandhe (Ind) and Nitin Pandit (Ind)
Player of the match: Jalaj Saxena (India A)

- India A won the toss and elected to field.

=== 2nd Unofficial Test ===
17–20 September 2019
Scorecard

India A	v	South Africa A
417 (123 overs); Shubman Gill 92 (137); Wiaan Mulder 3/47 (22 overs)		400 (109.3 overs); Aiden Markram 161 (253); Kuldeep Yadav 4/121 (29 overs)
202/3d (70 overs); Priyank Panchal 109 (192); Dane Piedt 2/88 (21 overs)

Match drawn
Srikantadatta Narasimha Raja Wadeyar Ground, Mysore
Umpires: Anil Dandekar (Ind) and Vineet Kulkarni (Ind)
Player of the match: Aiden Markram (South Africa A)

- South Africa A won the toss and elected to field.
