= List of international cricket centuries by Rohit Sharma =

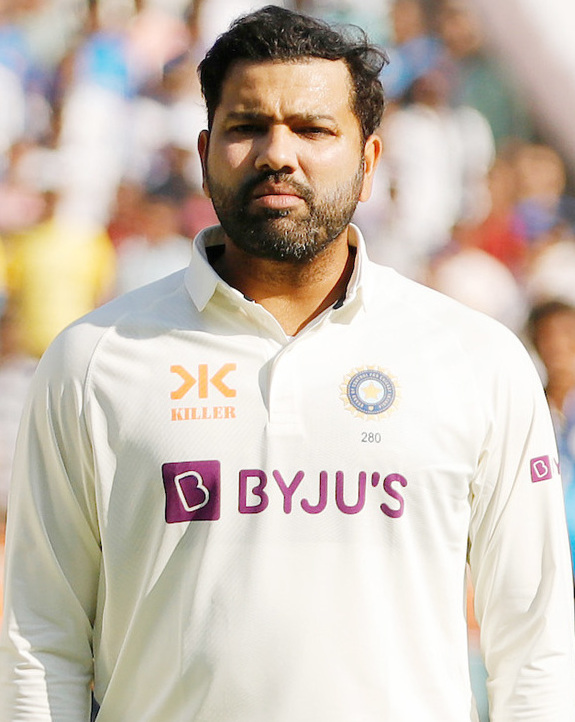
Rohit Sharma has scored 52 centuries in international cricket.

Rohit Sharma is an Indian cricketer who has represented the national team since 2007. He has made 52 centuries in international cricket—12 in Tests, 35 in One Day Internationals (ODI) and 5 in Twenty20 Internationals (T20Is)— as of September 2026.

His first century came during the 2010 Tri-Nation Tournament in Zimbabwe when he made 114 against the hosts. In the 2013 bilateral series against Australia at home, he made two centuries, including a double-century. (Note: Sharma became the third player to score an ODI double-century.) The next year, he scored 264 against Sri Lanka at the Eden Gardens, Kolkata. The score remains the highest individual total by a batsman in the format. In January 2016, he made 171 not out against Australia; it remained the highest score by a visiting batsman against Australia until England's Jason Roy made 180 in 2018. (Note: As of January 2020, this remains the seventh-highest individual score in Australia.) Sharma set the record for most centuries scored in a World Cup when he scored five centuries in the 2019 World Cup. He has scored centuries against nine different opponents and has the joint-highest number of centuries (nine) against Australia in the format. (Note: He shares the position with Sachin Tendulkar.) As of January 2020, Sharma has eight scores in excess of 150, and three double-centuries, both of which are records in ODIs. He has the second highest number of centuries for an active player in the format. (Note: Sharma is behind Kohli (51) and Tendulkar (49) in the all-time list.)

Sharma made his Test debut during the 2013–14 home series against the West Indies. He scored 177 on his debut and went on to make another century in the next match. (Note: Sharma was the 14th Indian to score a century on Test debut.) He scored three centuries in the home series against South Africa in October 2019—including 176 and 127 in the first match, (Note: He became the sixth Indian to score centuries in both innings of a Test match.) and a career-highest score of 212 in the third match.

Sharma made his T20I debut during the ICC T20 World Cup 2007 against England. In October 2015, he became the second Indian to score a century in the T20I format when he made 106 against South Africa. Sharma jointly held the record for the fastest century in men's T20I (off 35 balls) with South Africa's David Miller and Czech Republic's Sudesh Wickramasekara. (Note: It had come during the course of his 43-ball 118 against Sri Lanka in December 2017; the record has since been broken multiple times.) Sharma jointly holds the record for the most centuries in the format with five. (Note: He shares the record with Glenn Maxwell.)

As of November 2025, Sharma is ranked tenth among players with the most centuries in international cricket.

== Key ==
- * – Remained not out
- † – Man of the match
- ‡ – Captain of India in that match
- (D/L) – The result of the match was based upon the Duckworth–Lewis method

== Test cricket centuries ==
Test centuries scored by Rohit Sharma
No.	Score	Against	Pos.	Inn.	Test	Venue	H/A	Date	Result	Ref
1	177 †	West Indies	6	2	1/2	Eden Gardens, Kolkata	Home	6 November 2013	Won	
2	111*	West Indies	6	2	2/2	Wankhede Stadium, Mumbai	Home	14 November 2013	Won	
3	102*	Sri Lanka	6	2	2/3	Vidarbha Cricket Association Stadium, Nagpur	Home	24 November 2017	Won	
4	176 †	South Africa	2	1	1/3	VDCA Cricket Stadium, Vishakhapatnam	Home	2 October 2019	Won	
5	127 †	South Africa	2	3	1/3	VDCA Cricket Stadium, Vishakhapatnam	Home	2 October 2019	Won	
6	212 †	South Africa	2	1	3/3	JSCA International Stadium Complex, Ranchi	Home	19 October 2019	Won	
7	161	England	1	1	2/4	M. A. Chidambaram Stadium, Chennai	Home	13 February 2021	Won	
8	127 †	England	1	3	4/5	The Oval, London	Away	2 September 2021	Won	
9	120 ‡	Australia	1	2	1/4	Vidarbha Cricket Association Stadium, Nagpur	Home	9 February 2023	Won	
10	103 ‡	West Indies	2	2	1/2	Windsor Park, Roseau	Away	12 July 2023	Won	
11	131 ‡	England	2	1	3/5	Niranjan Shah Stadium, Rajkot	Home	15 February 2024	Won	
12	103 ‡	England	2	2	5/5	HPCA Stadium, Dharamshala	Home	7 March 2024	Won	

== One Day International cricket centuries ==
ODI centuries scored by Rohit Sharma
No.	Score	Against	Pos.	Inn.	S/R	Venue	H/A/N	Date	Result	Ref
1	114	Zimbabwe	4	1	95.79	Queens Sports Club, Bulawayo	Away	28 May 2010	Lost	
2	101* †	Sri Lanka	4	2	170.00	Queens Sports Club, Bulawayo	Neutral	30 May 2010	Won	
3	141* †	Australia	1	2	114.63	Sawai Mansingh Stadium, Jaipur	Home	16 October 2013	Won	
4	209 †	Australia	1	1	132.27	M. Chinnaswamy Stadium, Bangalore	Home	2 November 2013	Won	
5	264 †	Sri Lanka	2	1	152.60	Eden Gardens, Kolkata	Home	13 November 2014	Won	
6	138	Australia	1	1	99.28	Melbourne Cricket Ground, Melbourne	Away	18 January 2015	Lost	
7	137 †	Bangladesh	1	1	108.73	Melbourne Cricket Ground, Melbourne	Neutral	19 March 2015	Won	
8	150	South Africa	1	2	112.78	Green Park Stadium, Kanpur	Home	11 October 2015	Lost	
9	171*	Australia	1	1	104.90	WACA Ground, Perth	Away	12 January 2016	Lost	
10	124 †	Australia	1	1	97.63	The Gabba, Brisbane	Away	15 January 2016	Lost	
11	123* †	Bangladesh	1	2	95.34	Edgbaston Cricket Ground, Birmingham	Neutral	15 June 2017	Won	
12	124*	Sri Lanka	1	2	85.51	Pallekele International Cricket Stadium, Pallekele	Away	27 August 2017	Won	
13	104	Sri Lanka	1	1	118.18	R. Premadasa Stadium, Colombo	Away	31 August 2017	Won	
14	125 †	Australia	2	2	114.67	Vidarbha Cricket Association Stadium, Nagpur	Home	1 October 2017	Won	
15	147 †	New Zealand	1	1	106.52	Green Park Stadium, Kanpur	Home	29 October 2017	Won	
16	208* † ‡	Sri Lanka	1	1	135.94	Punjab Cricket Association Stadium, Mohali	Home	13 December 2017	Won	
17	115 †	South Africa	1	1	91.26	St. George's Park, Port Elizabeth	Away	13 February 2018	Won	
18	137*	England	1	2	120.17	Trent Bridge, Nottingham	Away	12 July 2018	Won	
19	111* ‡	Pakistan	1	2	93.27	Dubai Cricket Stadium, Dubai	Neutral	23 September 2018	Won	
20	152*	West Indies	1	2	129.58	ACA Stadium, Guwahati	Home	21 October 2018	Won	
21	162 †	West Indies	1	1	118.25	Brabourne Stadium, Mumbai	Home	29 October 2018	Won	
22	133	Australia	1	2	103.10	Sydney Cricket Ground, Sydney	Away	12 January 2019	Lost	
23	122* †	South Africa	1	2	85.10	Rose Bowl, Southampton	Neutral	5 June 2019	Won	
24	140 †	Pakistan	2	1	123.89	Old Trafford Cricket Ground, Manchester	Neutral	16 June 2019	Won (D/L)	
25	102	England	2	2	93.57	Edgbaston Cricket Ground, Birmingham	Away	30 June 2019	Lost	
26	104 †	Bangladesh	2	1	113.04	Edgbaston Cricket Ground, Birmingham	Neutral	2 July 2019	Won	
27	103 †	Sri Lanka	2	2	109.57	Headingley Cricket Ground, Leeds	Neutral	6 July 2019	Won	
28	159 †	West Indies	1	1	115.21	ACA-VDCA Stadium, Vishakhapatnam	Home	18 December 2019	Won	
29	119 †	Australia	1	2	92.96	M. Chinnaswamy Stadium, Bangalore	Home	19 January 2020	Won	
30	101 ‡	New Zealand	1	1	118.82	Holkar Cricket Stadium, Indore	Home	24 January 2023	Won	
31	131 † ‡	Afghanistan	1	2	155.95	Arun Jaitley Stadium, Delhi	Home	11 October 2023	Won	
32	119 † ‡	England	1	2	132.22	Barabati Stadium, Cuttack	Home	9 February 2025	Won	
33	121* †	Australia	1	2	96.80	Sydney Cricket Ground, Sydney	Away	25 October 2025	Won	
34	138	England	1	2	125.45	Lord's, London	Away	19 July 2026	Lost	
35	101	West Indies	1	2	134.66	ACA Stadium, Guwahati	Home	30 September 2026	Won	

== Twenty20 International cricket centuries ==
T20I centuries scored by Rohit Sharma
No.	Score	Against	Pos.	Inn.	S/R	Venue	H/A/N	Date	Result	Ref
1	106	South Africa	1	1	160.60	HPCA Stadium, Dharamsala	Home	2 October 2015	Lost	
2	118 † ‡	Sri Lanka	1	1	274.41	Holkar Cricket Stadium, Indore	Home	22 December 2017	Won	
3	100* †	England	1	2	178.57	Bristol County Ground, Bristol	Away	8 July 2018	Won	
4	111* † ‡	West Indies	1	1	181.96	Ekana Stadium, Lucknow	Home	6 November 2018	Won	
5	121* † ‡	Afghanistan	2	1	175.36	M. Chinnaswamy Stadium, Bangalore	Home	17 January 2024	Won	
