= 2018–19 Hyderabad C.A. season =

Hyderabad C.A.
2018–19 season
- Coach: Arjun Yadav (Senior men's); Savita Nirala (Senior women's)
- Captain: Akshath Reddy (Senior men's); Sravanthi Naidu (Senior women's)
- Ground(s): Rajiv Gandhi International Cricket Stadium, Hyderabad (Capacity: 55,000)
- Vijay Hazare Trophy: Semi-finals
- Ranji Trophy: Elite Group B (7th)
- One–Day League: Elite Group C (5th)
- T20 League: Group D (3rd)
- Syed Mushtaq Ali Trophy: Group E (6th)

The 2018–19 season is Hyderabad cricket team's 85th competitive season. The Hyderabad cricket team and Hyderabad women's cricket team are senior men's and women's domestic cricket teams based in the city of Hyderabad, India, run by the Hyderabad Cricket Association (HCA). They represent the state of Telangana in domestic competitions.

== Competition overview ==
| Category | Competition | Format | First match | Last match | Final position | Pld | W | L | D / T / NR | Win % |
|---|---|---|---|---|---|---|---|---|---|---|
| Senior men's | Vijay Hazare Trophy | List A cricket | 19 September 2018 | 17 October 2018 | Semi-finals | 10 | 6 | 3 | 1 | 60% |
| Senior men's | Ranji Trophy | First-class cricket | 1 November 2018 | 30 December 2018 | Group Stage | 8 | 1 | 1 | 6 | 12.50% |
| Senior women's | One Day League | Women's List A cricket | 1 December 2018 | 18 December 2018 | Elite Group Stage | 8 | 4 | 3 | 1 | 50% |
| Senior women's | T20 League | Women's Twenty20 cricket | 20 February 2019 | 1 March 2019 | Group Stage | 6 | 3 | 2 | 1 | 50% |
| Senior men's | Syed Mushtaq Ali Trophy | Twenty20 cricket | 21 February 2019 | 2 March 2019 | Group Stage | 7 | 1 | 5 | 1 | 14.28% |

== Senior men's team ==
=== Squads ===
- Head coach: Arjun Yadav
- Bowling Coach : Narender Pal Singh
- Fielding Coach : T Dilip
- Physio : Bheesham Pratap Singh
- Trainer : Naveen Reddy

| Vijay Hazare Trophy | Ranji Trophy | Syed Mushtaq Ali Trophy |
|---|---|---|
| Ambati Rayudu (c) (Note: Rayudu replaced Akshath as the captain and Himalay in the squad while Muddassir and Goud replaced Siraj and Ashish in the squad for the knockout stage.); Akshath Reddy (vc); Bavanaka Sandeep; Chama Milind; Tanmay Agarwal; Rohit Rayudu; Kolla Sumanth (wk); Mehdi Hasan; Ravi Kiran; Mohammad Siraj; Ravi Teja; Akash Bhandari; Palakodeti Sairam; Ashish Reddy; Tanay Thyagarajan; Himalay Agarwal; Mohammad Muddassir; Ajay Dev Goud | Akshath Reddy (c); Tanmay Agarwal; Bavanaka Sandeep; Rohit Rayudu; Kolla Sumanth (wk); Mehdi Hasan; Ravi Kiran (Note: Siraj and Ravi Kiran were replaced by Goud and Varma ahead of the match against the Andhra.); Chama Milind; Palakodeti Sairam; Akash Bhandari; Ravi Teja; Tanay Thyagarajan; Himalay Agarwal; KSK Chaitanya (wk); Mohammad Muddassir; Mohammad Siraj (Note: Siraj and Karthikeya were added to the squad ahead of the match against the Bengal.); Kartikeya Kak; Ajay Dev Goud; Tilak Varma | Ambati Rayudu (c) (Note: Rayudu was replaced by Akshath as the captain and Chaitanya in the squad while Karthikeya, Varma and Quraishi replaced Himalay, Akash and Ashish in the squad for the last three league games.); Akshath Reddy (vc); Himalay Agarwal; Tanmay Agarwal; Ashish Reddy; Akash Bhandari; Mehdi Hasan; Jamalpur Mallikarjun (wk); Chama Milind; Mohammad Siraj; Ravi Teja; Rohit Rayudu; Palakodeti Sairam; Bavanaka Sandeep; Kolla Sumanth (wk); Chaitanya Reddy; Kartikeya Kak; Tilak Varma; Abdul Ela Al Quraishi |

Pragyan Ojha moved to the Bihar ahead of the 2018–19 season. The Hyderabad also got new coach with Yadav replacing J. Arunkumar.

Duleep Trophy

Sandeep got selected to the India Red squad for the 2018–19 Duleep Trophy, a first-class cricket tournament in India.

Deodhar Trophy

Siraj got selected to the India A while Rohit to the India B for the 2018–19 Deodhar Trophy, a List A cricket tournament in India.

Indian Premier League

Siraj and Rayudu were retained by the Royal Challengers Bangalore and the Chennai Super Kings ahead of the auction for the 2019 Indian Premier League, a professional Twenty20 cricket league in India. None of the Hyderabad players were picked by the franchises during the auction.

=== Vijay Hazare Trophy ===
The Vijay Hazare Trophy, a List A cricket tournament in India, fixtures were announced by the Board of Control for Cricket in India (BCCI) on 29 August 2018 and the Hyderabad was placed in the Group B with all the group fixtures to be played in New Delhi. The team was selected on 12 September with Akshath Reddy appointed as the captain and Arjun Yadav as the head coach. Ambati Rayudu missed out on the selection because of his national duties for the 2018 Asia Cup while Chama Milind, who missed out last season because of the injury, made a comeback into the squad. Though there were doubts on the team selected owing to the eligibility of the selection committee who were appointed by the steering committee led by former players like V. V. S. Laxman and Mohammad Azharuddin but did not get cleared by the HCA general body as per the BCCI rule book, the team finally got the nod for the tournament on 18 September from the High Court appointed Committee of Administrators (CoA) though the CoA declared the selection committee illegal.

The Hyderabad began their campaign on a winning note defeating the Madhya Pradesh by seven wickets. The Hyderabadi bowlers took regular wickets to bowl-out Madhya Pradesh to 231 while measured half-centuries from Tanmay Agarwal and Rohit Rayudu completed the chase for the Hyderabad with seven wickets and 14 balls to spare. In the second match, Nitish Rana's unbeaten knock of 91 in 87 balls helped the Delhi chase the revised target of 176 in 30.4 overs in a rain-hit match to hand the Hyderabad their first defeat in the tournament. Earlier, it was Manan Sharma who troubled the Hyderabad batsmen in the middle with his four-wicket haul until Mohammad Siraj's cameo at the end with a couple of sixes that helped the Hyderabad to recover to 205. In another rain-affected reduced-over match, the Saurashtra successfully chased the revised target of 110 in 19 overs with the combined batting effort from Robin Uthappa, Aarpit Vasavada and Prerak Mankad. Earlier, the Hyderabad recovered in the middle from the top-order collapse with 95-run partnership between Kolla Sumanth and Bavanaka Sandeep but could not capitalize on that partnership as the Hyderabad suffered from another collapse at the end and were restricted to 196 in 45 overs. The Hyderabad's match against the Andhra, their fourth match of the tournament, was washed off due to the incessant rains in Delhi. In the fifth match, Mehdi Hasan's maiden fifer helped the Hyderabad bowl out the Uttar Pradesh for 130 despite their skipper, Suresh Raina's half-century while the opening partnership of 124 between Akshath and Tanmay handed the Hyderabad a 9-wicket win over the Uttar Pradesh. Chasing 223 to win, the Chhattisgarh were bowled out to 121 with Palakodeti Sairam and Mehdi sharing three wickets between them as the Hyderabad secured their third win in six matches. Earlier, Rohit's half-century along with the support from Sandeep's 41 helped the Hyderabad post 222 in 50 overs. Siraj missed the rest of the group matches for the Hyderabad as he was selected to the national team for the test series against the West Indies. In the seventh match, two-wicket hauls along with the tight bowling from Sairam and Ravi Kiran helped the Hyderabad restrict the Kerala to 189 despite the half-century from VA Jagadeesh while an unbeaten century partnership between Rohit and Sandeep completed the chase for the Hyderabad with seven wickets to spare. The Hyderabad survived the scare in their last group match defeating the Odisha narrowly by one wicket but still need the favorable results on the last day to qualify for the knockout stage. Chasing 248 to win, the Hyderabad enjoyed the strong start with the half-centuries from their openers, Tanmay and Akshath but their dismissals triggered the batting collapsed until an unbeaten 43-run knock from Sumanth completed the chase despite the flurry of wickets at the other end. Earlier, the Odisha had a strong start too with the century partnership between Govinda Poddar and Subhranshu Senapati but the six-wicket haul from Milind helped the Hyderabad restrict the Odisha to 247. The defeat of the Baroda to the Maharashtra in the Group A helped the Hyderabad advance to the knockout stage as they finished third in the Group B and fifth across the groups A & B with five wins, two losses and a draw.

The fixtures for the knockout stage were announced by the BCCI on 11 October with Bengaluru hosting all the fixtures as the Hyderabad faced the Andhra in the quarter-final on 15 October. The Hyderabad announced their squad for the knockout stage on 11 October as Rayudu came back to the squad to lead the team following the completion of the Asia Cup. Rayudu replaced Himalay Agarwal while Mohammad Muddassir replaced Siraj and the Hyderabad's U–19 all-rounder, Ajay Dev Goud replaced Ashish Reddy. With Siraj not being selected into playing XI for the India during the on-going West Indies Test Series, he was released by the BCCI on 14 October to play for the Hyderabad during the knockout stage. Chasing 282 in 50 overs, the Andhra lost the first wicket to Siraj but the half-centuries from Hanuma Vihari and Ricky Bhui put the Andhra in the winning position only for the Siraj to come back and remove the both set-batsmen that triggered the Andhra's collapse as they were restricted to 267 and helped the Hyderabad advance to the semi-final. Earlier, the Hyderabad posted 281 with the help of Sandeep's 96-run knock along with the supporting knocks from Rayudu and Sumanth in the middle and brisk scoring from Milind at the end. The Hyderabad was eliminated in the semi-final where the Mumbai defeated them in a rain-hit match by 60 runs. The Hyderabad were troubled early in the match despite Sandeep's counter-attack and were reduced to 123/6 in 35 overs but an unbeaten ton from Rohit along with the support from Akash Bhandari and Mehdi helped the Hyderabad post 246 in 50 overs. Prithvi Shaw started aggressively for the Mumbai scoring his fifty in just 34 balls and helped the Mumbai post 155 in 25 overs along with the support of an unbeaten half-century from Shreyas Iyer before the rain stopped the play. The Mumbai were adjudged winners as they were ahead by 60 runs according to the VJD method.

==== Points table ====
Group B

| Pos | Team | Pld | W | L | T | NR | Pts | NRR |
|---|---|---|---|---|---|---|---|---|
| 2 | Delhi | 8 | 6 | 1 | 0 | 1 | 26 | 1.258 |
| 4 | Andhra | 8 | 6 | 1 | 0 | 1 | 26 | 0.100 |
| 5 | Hyderabad | 8 | 5 | 2 | 0 | 1 | 22 | 0.539 |
| 8 | Kerala | 8 | 4 | 3 | 0 | 1 | 18 | −0.165 |
| 9 | Chhattisgarh | 8 | 4 | 4 | 0 | 0 | 16 | 0.278 |
| 13 | Saurashtra | 8 | 3 | 5 | 0 | 0 | 12 | −0.475 |
| 14 | Odisha | 8 | 2 | 5 | 0 | 1 | 10 | −0.181 |
| 15 | Uttar Pradesh | 8 | 1 | 5 | 0 | 2 | 8 | −0.378 |
| 17 | Madhya Pradesh | 8 | 1 | 6 | 0 | 1 | 6 | −0.984 |

- Top five teams across Groups A and B advanced to the knockout stage.
- Bottom two teams across Groups A and B relegated to the Elite Group C for the next season.

Points system : W = 4, T/NR = 2, L = 0.

==== Knockout stage ====
Quarterfinals
A1 | Mumbai | 71/1 (12.3 overs)
P | Bihar | 69 (28.2 overs)
B3 | Hyderabad | 281/8 (50 overs)
B2 | Andhra | 267/9 (50 overs)
A2 | Maharashtra | 181 (42.2 overs)
C1 | Jharkhand | 127/2 (32.3 overs)
C2 | Haryana | 229 (49.1 overs)
B1 | Delhi | 230/5 (39.2 overs)

Semifinals
A1 | Mumbai | 155/2 (25 overs)
B3 | Hyderabad | 246/8 (50 overs)
C1 | Jharkhand | 199 (48.5 overs)
B1 | Delhi | 200/8 (49.4 overs)

Final
A1 | Mumbai | 180/6 (35 overs)
B1 | Delhi | 177 (45.4 overs)

==== Matches ====
Group Stage

| 19 September 2018 | Madhya Pradesh; 231 (48.2 overs) | v | Hyderabad; 235/3 (47.4 overs) | Hyderabad won by 7 wickets |
| 09:00 IST Round 1 Scorecard | Madhya Pradesh; 231 (48.2 overs) | v | Hyderabad; 235/3 (47.4 overs) | Palam B Ground, Delhi; Umpires: Amit Bansal and Rajeev Godara |
| 09:00 IST Round 1 Scorecard | Rajat Patidar 49 (63); Mohammed Siraj 3/42 (9.2 overs) | | Tanmay Agarwal 83 (109); Rameez Khan 2/34 (6 overs) | Palam B Ground, Delhi; Umpires: Amit Bansal and Rajeev Godara |
| Madhya Pradesh won the toss and elected to bat.; Aryaman Birla and Ajay Rohera (Madhya Pradesh) both made their List A debuts. | | | | Palam B Ground, Delhi; Umpires: Amit Bansal and Rajeev Godara |

| 21 September 2018 | Hyderabad; 205 (47.4 overs) | v | Delhi; 178/4 (30.4 overs) | Delhi won by 6 wickets (VJD method) |
| 09:00 IST Round 2 Scorecard | Hyderabad; 205 (47.4 overs) | v | Delhi; 178/4 (30.4 overs) | Feroz Shah Kotla, Delhi; Umpires: Akshay Totre and Abhijit Deshmukh |
| 09:00 IST Round 2 Scorecard | Bavanaka Sandeep 51 (67); Manan Sharma 4/42 (9 overs) | | Nitish Rana 91* (87); Ravi Kiran 2/24 (5 overs) | Feroz Shah Kotla, Delhi; Umpires: Akshay Totre and Abhijit Deshmukh |
| Hyderabad won the toss and elected to bat. | | | | Feroz Shah Kotla, Delhi; Umpires: Akshay Totre and Abhijit Deshmukh |

| 23 September 2018 | Hyderabad; 196/9 (45 overs) | v | Saurashtra; 110/3 (18.5 overs) | Saurashtra won by 7 wickets (VJD method) |
| 09:00 IST Round 3 Scorecard | Hyderabad; 196/9 (45 overs) | v | Saurashtra; 110/3 (18.5 overs) | Palam B Stadium, New Delhi; Umpires: Abhijit Deshmukh and Somnath Jha |
| 09:00 IST Round 3 Scorecard | Bavanaka Sandeep 76 (83); Jaydev Unadkat 4/33 (8 overs) | | Robin Uthappa 35 (39); Mehdi Hasan 2/13 (3 overs) | Palam B Stadium, New Delhi; Umpires: Abhijit Deshmukh and Somnath Jha |
| Hyderabad won the toss and elected to bat.; Yuvraj Chudasama (Saurashtra) made his List A debut. | | | | Palam B Stadium, New Delhi; Umpires: Abhijit Deshmukh and Somnath Jha |

| 24 September 2018 | Andhra | v | Hyderabad | Match Abandoned |
| 09:00 IST Round 4 Scorecard | Andhra | v | Hyderabad | Palam B Stadium, New Delhi; Umpires: Abhijit Deshmukh and Somnath Jha |
| No toss.; No play was possible due to rain. | | | | Palam B Stadium, New Delhi; Umpires: Abhijit Deshmukh and Somnath Jha |

| 28 September 2018 | Uttar Pradesh; 130 (39.1 overs) | v | Hyderabad; 134/1 (35.2 overs) | Hyderabad won by 9 wickets |
| 09:00 IST Round 5 Scorecard | Uttar Pradesh; 130 (39.1 overs) | v | Hyderabad; 134/1 (35.2 overs) | Palam A Stadium, New Delhi; Umpires: Amit Bansal and Tapan Sharma |
| 09:00 IST Round 5 Scorecard | Suresh Raina 53 (64); Mehdi Hasan 5/20 (10 overs) | | Akshath Reddy 64 (89); Shiva Singh 1/31 (10 overs) | Palam A Stadium, New Delhi; Umpires: Amit Bansal and Tapan Sharma |
| Uttar Pradesh won the toss and elected to bat.; Abhishek Goswami and Rajat Goel (Uttar Pradesh) both made their List A debuts. | | | | Palam A Stadium, New Delhi; Umpires: Amit Bansal and Tapan Sharma |

| 30 September 2018 | Hyderabad; 222/9 (50 overs) | v | Chhattisgarh; 121 (33.3 overs) | Hyderabad won by 101 runs |
| 09:00 IST Round 6 Scorecard | Hyderabad; 222/9 (50 overs) | v | Chhattisgarh; 121 (33.3 overs) | Palam A Stadium, New Delhi; Umpires: Sanjay Kumar Singh and Nikhil Patwardhan |
| 09:00 IST Round 6 Scorecard | Rohit Rayudu 75 (102); Pankaj Rao 3/41 (10 overs) | | Ashutosh Singh 38 (60); Mehdi Hasan 3/19 (7.3 overs) | Palam A Stadium, New Delhi; Umpires: Sanjay Kumar Singh and Nikhil Patwardhan |
| Chhattisgarh won the toss and elected to field.; Rishabh Tiwari and Ajay Mandal (Chhattisgarh) both made their List A debuts. | | | | Palam A Stadium, New Delhi; Umpires: Sanjay Kumar Singh and Nikhil Patwardhan |

| 2 October 2018 | Kerala; 189/6 (50 overs) | v | Hyderabad; 190/3 (46.4 overs) | Hyderabad won by 7 wickets |
| 09:00 IST Round 7 Scorecard | Kerala; 189/6 (50 overs) | v | Hyderabad; 190/3 (46.4 overs) | Palam A Stadium, New Delhi; Umpires: Sanjay Kumar Singh and Navdeep Singh |
| 09:00 IST Round 7 Scorecard | VA Jagadeesh 62 (92); Palakodeti Sairam 2/27 (10 overs) | | Rohit Rayudu 57* (86); Jalaj S Saxena 2/22 (10 overs) | Palam A Stadium, New Delhi; Umpires: Sanjay Kumar Singh and Navdeep Singh |
| Kerala won the toss and elected to bat. | | | | Palam A Stadium, New Delhi; Umpires: Sanjay Kumar Singh and Navdeep Singh |

| 6 October 2018 | Odisha; 247/8 (50 overs) | v | Hyderabad; 250/9 (49.2 overs) | Hyderabad won by 1 wicket |
| 09:00 IST Round 8 Scorecard | Odisha; 247/8 (50 overs) | v | Hyderabad; 250/9 (49.2 overs) | Feroz Shah Kotla Ground, Delhi; Umpires: Rajeev Godara and Somnath Jha |
| 09:00 IST Round 8 Scorecard | Govinda Poddar 93 (108); Chama Milind 6/43 (10 overs) | | Tanmay Agarwal 76 (89); Papu Roy 3/38 (10 overs) | Feroz Shah Kotla Ground, Delhi; Umpires: Rajeev Godara and Somnath Jha |
| Odisha won the toss and elected to bat. | | | | Feroz Shah Kotla Ground, Delhi; Umpires: Rajeev Godara and Somnath Jha |

Quarter-final

| 15 October 2018 | Hyderabad; 281/8 (50 overs) | v | Andhra; 267/9 (50 overs) | Hyderabad won by 14 runs |
| 09:00 Quarterfinal 4 Scorecard | Hyderabad; 281/8 (50 overs) | v | Andhra; 267/9 (50 overs) | Just Cricket Academy Ground, Bengaluru; Umpires: Ulhas Gandhe and Tapan Sharma; Player of the match: Bavanaka Sandeep (Hyderabad) |
| 09:00 Quarterfinal 4 Scorecard | Bavanaka Sandeep 96 (97); Bandaru Ayyappa 2/38 (10 overs) | | Hanuma Vihari 95 (99); Mohammed Siraj 3/50 (10 overs) | Just Cricket Academy Ground, Bengaluru; Umpires: Ulhas Gandhe and Tapan Sharma; Player of the match: Bavanaka Sandeep (Hyderabad) |
| Andhra won the toss and elected to field.; Prithvi Raj (Andhra) made his List A debut. | | | | Just Cricket Academy Ground, Bengaluru; Umpires: Ulhas Gandhe and Tapan Sharma; Player of the match: Bavanaka Sandeep (Hyderabad) |

Semi-final

| 17 October 2018 | Hyderabad; 246/8 (50 overs) | v | Mumbai; 155/2 (25 overs) | Mumbai won by 60 runs (VJD method) |
| 09:00 Semifinal 1 Scorecard | Hyderabad; 246/8 (50 overs) | v | Mumbai; 155/2 (25 overs) | M. Chinnaswamy Stadium, Bengaluru; Umpires: Ulhas Gandhe and Krishnaraj Srinath; Player of the match: Tushar Deshpande (Mumbai) |
| 09:00 Semifinal 1 Scorecard | Rohit Rayudu 121* (132); Tushar Deshpande 3/55 (10 overs) | | Prithvi Shaw 61 (44); Mehdi Hassan 2/23 (6 overs) | M. Chinnaswamy Stadium, Bengaluru; Umpires: Ulhas Gandhe and Krishnaraj Srinath; Player of the match: Tushar Deshpande (Mumbai) |
| Hyderabad won the toss and elected to bat.; Mumbai were set a revised target of 96 runs from 25 overs due to rain. | | | | M. Chinnaswamy Stadium, Bengaluru; Umpires: Ulhas Gandhe and Krishnaraj Srinath; Player of the match: Tushar Deshpande (Mumbai) |

==== Statistics ====
Batting

| Name | Mat | Inn | Runs | Ave | SR | HS | 100 | 50 |
|---|---|---|---|---|---|---|---|---|
| Rohit Rayudu | 9 | 9 | 398 | 66.33 | 70.19 | 121* | 1 | 3 |
| Bavanaka Sandeep | 9 | 8 | 371 | 61.83 | 82.81 | 96 | 0 | 3 |
| Tanmay Agarwal | 9 | 9 | 303 | 37.87 | 66.88 | 83 | 0 | 3 |
| Akshath Reddy | 9 | 9 | 273 | 30.33 | 72.99 | 64 | 0 | 2 |
| Kolla Sumanth | 9 | 7 | 172 | 34.40 | 63.70 | 47 | 0 | 0 |

Bowling

| Name | Mat | Inn | Wkts | Ave | Eco | BBI | SR | 4WI | 5WI |
|---|---|---|---|---|---|---|---|---|---|
| Mehdi Hasan | 9 | 9 | 15 | 18.13 | 3.76 | 5/20 | 28.8 | 0 | 1 |
| Chama Milind | 8 | 8 | 11 | 23.81 | 4.94 | 6/43 | 28.9 | 0 | 1 |
| Mohammed Siraj | 7 | 7 | 8 | 29.25 | 5.77 | 3/42 | 30.3 | 0 | 0 |
| Ravi Kiran | 7 | 7 | 8 | 33.00 | 5.17 | 2/24 | 38.2 | 0 | 0 |
| Akash Bhandari | 9 | 9 | 7 | 38.00 | 4.43 | 2/31 | 51.4 | 0 | 0 |

=== Ranji Trophy ===
Ranji Trophy, a first-class cricket tournament in India, fixtures were announced by the Board of Control for Cricket in India (BCCI) on 29 August 2018 and the Hyderabad was placed in Group B. The team was selected on 29 October with Akshath Reddy appointed as the captain to lead the team in their opening match against the Kerala on 1 November in the absence of their senior player, Ambati Rayudu, who was on the national duty. Rayudu later announced his retirement from the first-class cricket on 3 November to focus on the shorter version of the game.

The Hyderabad began their campaign with a draw against the Kerala. The centuries from Sachin Baby and VA Jagadeesh helped the Kerala declare their first innings at 495/6 after they lost the toss and were put to bat by the Hyderabad. The rain played the spoil-sport washing out the third day with the match heading towards the draw while Kolla Sumanth and Bavanaka Sandeep avoided the Kerala bowl out the Hyderabad for three points on the last day as both teams shared one point each in the end. The Hyderabad won the toss and elected to bat in the second match against the Tamil Nadu who were competing without their main players – Ravichandran Ashwin, Murali Vijay and Vijay Shankar. Akshath led their batting from the front scoring his maiden double century in the first-class cricket while Sandeep scored a century as the Hyderabad declared their innings at 565/8 inside first hour of the third day. The centuries from Abhinav Mukund and Narayan Jagadeesan helped the Tamil Nadu not lose the wickets as their first innings remained unfinished ending the match in a draw as both teams shared a point. The Hyderabad faced the Nitish Rana-led Delhi on 20 November as they won the toss and elected to bat in their first home match of the tournament while the Delhi missed the services of their senior players, Gautam Gambhir and Ishant Sharma, in this match. The century from Tanmay Agarwal provided the good start for the Hyderaabad while the maiden century from Ravi Teja and his 133-run stand with Chama Milind helped the Hyderabad post 460 in their first innings despite the middle-order collapse. The debutant, Tanay Thyagarajan, put the Hyderabad on the top as his five-wicket haul helped the Hyderabad secure the first innings lead on the last day of the match despite the half-centuries from Hiten Dalal, Lalit Yadav and Rana. Having already secured three points for the match and not much time to get the result for the match, the Hyderabad posted 156/1 in 43 overs with the help of the half-centuries from Tanmay and Akshath before the both sides agreed to call-off the match early. The Hyderabad lost the toss and were asked to field as they faced the Himachal Pradesh in their fourth match. The century from Prashant Chopra along with the half-centuries from Priyanshu Khanduri and Mayank Dagar helped the Himachal post 351. In reply, the collective batting effort from the Hyderabad batsmen including the half-centuries from Akshath, Sandeep and Ravi Teja helped them secure a slender first innings lead of one run. The Hyderabad bowlers led by Ravi Kiran bowled out the Himachal on the last day for 97 in 45.2 overs in the second innings with Ravi Kiran claiming four wickets while their openers completed the chase in 29 overs to secure a ten-wicket win and a bonus point.

The Hyderabad were bowled out for 124 in 35.3 overs after losing the toss and asked to bat against the Madhya Pradesh in their fifth match of the tournament. Himalay Agarwal resisted the initial collapse to help the Hyderabad recover from 29/5 and remained unbeaten at 69 as Avesh Khan finished the innings with his seven-wicket haul. The debutant, Ajay Rohera, posted an unbeaten world-record debut score of 267 as the Madhya Pradesh declared their first innings at 562. The Hyderabad could not avoid the collapse once again as they were bowled out for 185 despite the half-century from Rohit Rayudu as the first innings hero for the Madhya Pradesh, Khan, finished the match with another five-wicket haul in the second innings to help the Madhya Pradesh win by an innings and a bonus point. Mohammad Siraj and Karthikeya Kak were added to the squad with former returning from a successful tour with the India A and latter on his form while playing for U-23 while KSK Chaitanya replaced the out-of-form Sumanth as wicket-keeper in the playing XI ahead of the match against the Bengal. The Hyderabad won the toss and elected to field which was affected by the delayed start due to wet outfield as Abhimanyu Easwaran's knock of 186 helped the Bengal post 336 despite the four-wicket haul from Ravi Kiran. In reply, the half-centuries from Rohit and Himalay could not help the Hyderabad get three points as the four-wicket hauls from Ashoke Dinda and Mukesh Kumar helped the Bengal take the first-innings lead of 24 runs in a drawn match.

==== Points table ====
Group B

| Pos | Team | Pld | W | L | D | T | NR | Pts | Quot |
|---|---|---|---|---|---|---|---|---|---|
| 4 | Kerala | 8 | 4 | 3 | 1 | 0 | 0 | 26 | 1.156 |
| 7 | Madhya Pradesh | 8 | 3 | 2 | 3 | 0 | 0 | 24 | 1.144 |
| 8 | Bengal | 8 | 2 | 1 | 5 | 0 | 0 | 23 | 1.076 |
| 9 | Punjab | 8 | 2 | 1 | 5 | 0 | 0 | 23 | 1.017 |
| 10 | Himachal Pradesh | 8 | 3 | 3 | 2 | 0 | 0 | 22 | 1.042 |
| 12 | Andhra | 8 | 1 | 2 | 5 | 0 | 0 | 17 | 0.900 |
| 13 | Hyderabad | 8 | 1 | 1 | 6 | 0 | 0 | 17 | 0.840 |
| 14 | Tamil Nadu | 8 | 1 | 2 | 5 | 0 | 0 | 15 | 1.016 |
| 16 | Delhi | 8 | 1 | 3 | 4 | 0 | 0 | 14 | 0.822 |

- Top five teams across Groups A and B advanced to the knockout stage.
- Bottom two teams across Groups A and B relegated to the Elite Group C for the next season.

Points system : win by an innings or 10 wickets = 7, win = 6, draw with first innings lead = 3, draw with first innings deficit = 1, no result = 1, loss = 0.

==== Matches ====
Group Stage

| 1–4 November 2018 | (home team) Kerala | v | Hyderabad | Match Drawn |
| Round 1 Scorecard | 495/6d (164 overs); Sachin Baby 147 (296); Palakodeti Sairam 3/110 (32 overs) | | 228/5 (112 overs); Bavanaka Sandeep 56* (155); Akshay Chandran 2/44 (20 overs) | St Xavier's College Ground, Thumba; Umpires: Vineet Kulkarni and GS Ananth Ramakrishnan; Player of the match: VA Jagadeesh (Kerala) |
Hyderabad won the toss and elected to field.; Bavanaka Sandeep (Hyderabad) scored his 3,000th run in the first-class cricket.

| 12–15 November 2018 | Hyderabad | v | Tamil Nadu (home team) | Match Drawn |
| Round 2 Scorecard | 565/8d (186 overs); Akshath Reddy 250 (480); M. Mohammed 3/102 (31 overs) | | 409/4 (154 overs); Abhinav Mukund 178 (398); Chama Milind 2/46 (21 overs) | Indian Cement Company Ground, Tirunelveli; Umpires: Sivasubramaniyan Shankar and Pashchim Pathak; Player of the match: Akshath Reddy (Hyderabad) |
Hyderabad won the toss and elected to bat.; Varun Chakravathi (Tamil Nadu) made his first-class debut.; Akshath Reddy (Hyderabad) scored his maiden double-century in the first-class cricket.

| 20–23 November 2018 | (home team) Hyderabad | v | Delhi | Match Drawn Hyderabad took first innings lead |
| Round 3 Scorecard | 460 (170.3 overs); Tanmay Agarwal 120 (272); Gaurav Kumar 3/50 (22.3 overs) | | 339 (128.1 overs); Hiten Dalal 93 (180); Tanay Thyagarajan 5/77 (28 overs) | Rajiv Gandhi International Cricket Stadium, Hyderabad; Umpires: Krishnaraj Srinath and Puttarangaiah Jayapal; Player of the match: Tanay Thyagarajan (Hyderabad) |
| Round 3 Scorecard | 156/1 (43 overs); Tanmay Agarwal 82 (111); Nitish Rana 1/29 (9 overs) | | | Rajiv Gandhi International Cricket Stadium, Hyderabad; Umpires: Krishnaraj Srinath and Puttarangaiah Jayapal; Player of the match: Tanay Thyagarajan (Hyderabad) |
Hyderabad won the toss and elected to bat.; Tanay Thyagarajan (Hyderabad); Sarthak Ranjan, Gaurav Kumar and Simarjeet Singh (Delhi) all made their first-class debuts.

| 28 November–1 December 2018 | Himachal Pradesh | v | Hyderabad (home team) | Hyderabad won by 10 wickets |
| Round 4 Scorecard | 351 (126.4 overs); Prashant Chopra 110 (190); Tanay Thyagarajan 4/86 (37 overs) | | 352 (130.5 overs); Akshath Reddy 99 (192); Arpit Guleria 3/64 (32 overs) | Rajiv Gandhi International Cricket Stadium, Hyderabad; Umpires: Yeshwant Barde and Sadashiv Iyer; Player of the match: Ravi Kiran (Hyderabad) |
| Round 4 Scorecard | 97 (45.2 overs); Sumeet Verma 19 (53); Ravi Kiran 4/34 (14 overs) | | 97/0 (28.2 overs); Tanmay Agarwal 48* (87) | Rajiv Gandhi International Cricket Stadium, Hyderabad; Umpires: Yeshwant Barde and Sadashiv Iyer; Player of the match: Ravi Kiran (Hyderabad) |
Himachal Pradesh won the toss and elected to bat.; Arpit Guleria (Himachal Pradesh) made his first-class debut.

| 6–9 December 2018 | Hyderabad | v | Madhya Pradesh (home team) | Madhya Pradesh won by an innings and 253 runs |
| Round 5 Scorecard | 124 (35.3 overs); Himalay Agarwal 69* (76); Avesh Khan 7/24 (12.3 overs) | | 562/4d (140.4 overs); Ajay Rohera 267* (345); Ravi Kiran 2/103 (30 overs) | Holkar Cricket Stadium, Indore; Umpires: Amiesh Saheba and Virender Sharma; Player of the match: Ajay Rohera (Madhya Pradesh) |
| Round 5 Scorecard | 185 (65.5 overs); Rohit Rayudu 72 (185); Avesh Khan 5/30 (13.5 overs) | | | Holkar Cricket Stadium, Indore; Umpires: Amiesh Saheba and Virender Sharma; Player of the match: Ajay Rohera (Madhya Pradesh) |
Madhya Pradesh won the toss and elected to field.; Venkatesh Iyer and Ajay Rohera (Madhya Pradesh) both made their first-class debuts.; Ajay Rohera's (Madhya Pradesh) knock of 267* set a new record for the highest first-class debut score.

| 14–17 December 2018 | Bengal | v | Hyderabad (home team) | Match Drawn Bengal took first innings lead |
| Round 6 Scorecard | 336 (120.3 overs); Abhimanyu Easwaran 186 (337); Ravi Kiran 4/46 (26.3 overs) | | 312 (123.1 overs); Rohit Rayudu 93 (261); Mukesh Kumar 4/54 (27 overs) | Rajiv Gandhi International Cricket Stadium, Hyderabad; Umpires: Sai Darshan Kumar and Puttarangaiah Jayapal; Player of the match: Abhimanyu Easwaran (Bengal) |
| Round 6 Scorecard | 49/1 (14 overs); Sudip Chatterjee 30* (43); Chama Milind 1/14 (5 overs) | | | Rajiv Gandhi International Cricket Stadium, Hyderabad; Umpires: Sai Darshan Kumar and Puttarangaiah Jayapal; Player of the match: Abhimanyu Easwaran (Bengal) |
Hyderabad won the toss and elected to field.; KSK Chaitanya (Hyderabad); Sahabaz Ahmed (Bengal) all made their first-class debuts.

| 22–25 December 2018 | (home team) Hyderabad | v | Punjab | Match Drawn Hyderabad took first innings lead |
| Round 7 Scorecard | 317 (109.3 overs); Himalay Agarwal 79 (171); Mayank Markande 6/84 (31.3 overs) | | 303 (93.5 overs); Gurkeerat Singh 87* (130); Ravi Teja 5/57 (19.5 overs) | Rajiv Gandhi International Cricket Stadium, Hyderabad; Umpires: K. N. Ananthapadmanabhan and Sudhir Asnani; Player of the match: Ravi Teja (Hyderabad) |
| Round 7 Scorecard | 323/3d (86 overs); Akshath Reddy 161* (218); Arpit Pannu 1/67 (12 overs) | | 324/8 (57 overs); Shubman Gill 148 (154); Mohammad Siraj 4/71 (15 overs) | Rajiv Gandhi International Cricket Stadium, Hyderabad; Umpires: K. N. Ananthapadmanabhan and Sudhir Asnani; Player of the match: Ravi Teja (Hyderabad) |
Hyderabad won the toss and elected to bat.

| 30 December 2018 – 2 January 2019 | Hyderabad | v | Andhra (home team) | Match Drawn Andhra took first innings lead |
| Round 8 Scorecard | 271 (90.3 overs); Himalay Agarwal 59 (103); K. V. Sasikanth 5/64 (24 overs) | | 502/7d (154 overs); K. S. Bharat 178* (277); Mehdi Hasan 3/127 (49 overs) | Dr PVG Raju ACA Sports Complex, Vizianagaram; Umpires: Nitin Pandit and Krishnamachari Srinivasan; Player of the match: K. S. Bharat (Andhra) |
| Round 8 Scorecard | 251/5 (85 overs); Akshath Reddy 65 (98); Shoaib Md Khan 2/70 (18 overs) | | | Dr PVG Raju ACA Sports Complex, Vizianagaram; Umpires: Nitin Pandit and Krishnamachari Srinivasan; Player of the match: K. S. Bharat (Andhra) |
Andhra won the toss and elected to field.; Tilak Varma and Ajay Dev Goud (Hyderabad) both made their first-class debuts.

==== Statistics ====
Batting

| Name | Mat | Inn | Runs | Ave | SR | HS | 100 | 50 |
|---|---|---|---|---|---|---|---|---|
| Akshath Reddy | 8 | 12 | 797 | 79.70 | 54.40 | 250 | 2 | 4 |
| Tanmay Agarwal | 8 | 13 | 538 | 44.83 | 46.14 | 120 | 1 | 3 |
| Himalay Agarwal | 8 | 11 | 520 | 65.00 | 47.22 | 79 | 0 | 6 |
| Bavanaka Sandeep | 8 | 11 | 450 | 45.00 | 46.24 | 130 | 1 | 2 |
| Rohit Rayudu | 7 | 10 | 323 | 35.88 | 34.14 | 93 | 0 | 3 |

Bowling

| Name | Mat | Inn | Wkts | Ave | Eco | BBI | SR | 5WI | 10WM |
|---|---|---|---|---|---|---|---|---|---|
| Tanay Thyagarajan | 5 | 8 | 17 | 29.88 | 3.04 | 5/77 | 58.8 | 1 | 0 |
| Ravi Kiran | 7 | 9 | 15 | 28.46 | 2.46 | 4/34 | 69.2 | 0 | 0 |
| Mehdi Hasan | 7 | 9 | 13 | 52.84 | 2.58 | 3/127 | 122.7 | 0 | 0 |
| Ravi Teja | 6 | 8 | 12 | 48.75 | 3.76 | 5/57 | 77.7 | 1 | 0 |
| Mohammad Siraj | 2 | 4 | 8 | 30.12 | 3.17 | 4/71 | 56.8 | 0 | 0 |

=== Syed Mushtaq Ali Trophy ===
The Syed Mushtaq Ali Trophy, a Twenty20 tournament in India, fixtures were announced by the Board of Control for Cricket in India (BCCI) and the Hyderabad was placed in the Group E with all the group fixtures to be played at New Delhi. Ambati Rayudu announced his availability for the team ahead of the tournament. The Hyderabad selectors made the passing of Yo-Yo fitness endurance test, an endurance test used by the Indian cricket team and the other international teams, as mandatory for the selection process to ascertain the fitness level of the players. The 15-men squad led by Rayudu was announced on 15 February 2019.

==== Points table ====
Group E

| Team | Pld | W | L | T | NR | Pts | NRR |
|---|---|---|---|---|---|---|---|
| Maharashtra | 7 | 5 | 1 | 0 | 1 | 22 | +1.249 |
| Uttar Pradesh | 7 | 5 | 1 | 0 | 1 | 22 | +2.154 |
| Uttarakhand | 7 | 4 | 2 | 0 | 1 | 18 | –1.287 |
| Services (H) | 7 | 4 | 2 | 0 | 1 | 18 | +0.529 |
| Baroda | 7 | 3 | 3 | 0 | 1 | 14 | –0.059 |
| Hyderabad | 7 | 1 | 5 | 0 | 1 | 6 | –0.182 |
| Pondicherry | 7 | 1 | 5 | 0 | 1 | 6 | –1.238 |
| Tripura | 7 | 1 | 5 | 0 | 1 | 6 | –1.265 |

- Top two teams advances to the Super League.

(H) - Host Points system : W = 4, T/NR = 2, L = 0.

==== Matches ====
Group Stage

| 21 February 2019 | Puducherry; 159/6 (20 overs) | v | Hyderabad; 156/9 (20 overs) | Puducherry won by 3 runs |
| 09:00 IST Round 1 Scorecard | Puducherry; 159/6 (20 overs) | v | Hyderabad; 156/9 (20 overs) | Palam B Ground, Delhi; Umpires: Saiyed Khalid and Abhijit Deshmukh |
| 09:00 IST Round 1 Scorecard | Paras Dogra 89 (48); Mehdi Hasan 2/29 (4 overs) | | Akshath Reddy 60* (51); Parandaman Thamaraikannan 4/39 (4 overs) | Palam B Ground, Delhi; Umpires: Saiyed Khalid and Abhijit Deshmukh |
| Hyderabad won the toss and elected to field.; Rohit Rayudu (Hyderabad); S Karthik, Damodaren Rohit, Vikneshwaran Marimuthu, Parandaman Thamaraikannan, Akshay Jain, Santhosh Kumaran and A Aravinddaraj (Puducherry) all made their T20 debuts. | | | | Palam B Ground, Delhi; Umpires: Saiyed Khalid and Abhijit Deshmukh |

| 22 February 2019 | Hyderabad; 139/7 (20 overs) | v | Uttar Pradesh; 143/4 (18.3 overs) | Uttar Pradesh won by 6 wickets |
| 13:30 IST Round 2 Scorecard | Hyderabad; 139/7 (20 overs) | v | Uttar Pradesh; 143/4 (18.3 overs) | Palam B Ground, Delhi; Umpires: Nitin Pandit and Saiyed Khalid |
| 13:30 IST Round 2 Scorecard | Bavanaka Sandeep 33 (31); Ankit Rajpoot 3/31 (4 overs) | | Suresh Raina 54* (35); Ashish Reddy 3/33 (4 overs) | Palam B Ground, Delhi; Umpires: Nitin Pandit and Saiyed Khalid |
| Hyderabad won the toss and elected to field.; Palakodeti Sairam (Hyderabad) made his T20 debut. | | | | Palam B Ground, Delhi; Umpires: Nitin Pandit and Saiyed Khalid |

| 24 February 2019 | Hyderabad; 131/7 (20 overs) | v | Baroda; 134/6 (19.4 overs) | Baroda won by 4 wickets |
| 09:00 IST Round 3 Scorecard | Hyderabad; 131/7 (20 overs) | v | Baroda; 134/6 (19.4 overs) | Palam B Ground, Delhi; Umpires: Nitin Pandit and Krishnamachari Srinivasan |
| 09:00 IST Round 3 Scorecard | Akshath Reddy 46 (44); Rishi Arothe 4/18 (4 overs) | | Vishnu Solanki 40 (38); Chama Milind 2/18 (3.4 overs) | Palam B Ground, Delhi; Umpires: Nitin Pandit and Krishnamachari Srinivasan |
| Baroda won the toss and elected to field. | | | | Palam B Ground, Delhi; Umpires: Nitin Pandit and Krishnamachari Srinivasan |

| 25 February 2019 | Hyderabad; 124/6 (20 overs) | v | Maharashtra; 125/3 (18 overs) | Maharashtra won by 7 wickets |
| 13:30 IST Round 4 Scorecard | Hyderabad; 124/6 (20 overs) | v | Maharashtra; 125/3 (18 overs) | Palam B Ground, Delhi; Umpires: Abhijit Deshmukh and Krishnamachari Srinivasan |
| 13:30 IST Round 4 Scorecard | Rohit Rayudu 45* (34); Vishal Gite 2/30 (4 overs) | | Ruturaj Gaikwad 54 (40); Palakodeti Sairam 2/38 (4 overs) | Palam B Ground, Delhi; Umpires: Abhijit Deshmukh and Krishnamachari Srinivasan |
| Hyderabad won the toss and elected to bat. | | | | Palam B Ground, Delhi; Umpires: Abhijit Deshmukh and Krishnamachari Srinivasan |

| 27 February 2019 | Tripura; 79/9 (17 overs) | v | Hyderabad; 80/2 (13.3 overs) | Hyderabad won by 8 wickets |
| 09:00 IST Round 5 Scorecard | Tripura; 79/9 (17 overs) | v | Hyderabad; 80/2 (13.3 overs) | Palam A Ground, Delhi; Umpires: Saiyed Khalid and Pashchim Pathak |
| 09:00 IST Round 5 Scorecard | Nirupam Sen Chowdhary 16 (18); Chama Milind 3/11 (3 overs) | | Tanmay Agarwal 38* (41); Manisankar Murasingh 1/11 (3 overs) | Palam A Ground, Delhi; Umpires: Saiyed Khalid and Pashchim Pathak |
| Hyderabad won the toss and elected to field.; Chaitanya Reddy (Hyderabad) made his T20 debut. | | | | Palam A Ground, Delhi; Umpires: Saiyed Khalid and Pashchim Pathak |

| 28 February 2019 | Hyderabad; 135/8 (20 overs) | v | Services; 141/6 (19.4 overs) | Services won by 4 wickets |
| 13:30 IST Round 6 Scorecard | Hyderabad; 135/8 (20 overs) | v | Services; 141/6 (19.4 overs) | Palam A Ground, Delhi; Umpires: Saiyed Khalid and Navdeep Sidhu |
| 13:30 IST Round 6 Scorecard | Akshath Reddy 34 (31); Rajat Paliwal 2/9 (2 overs) | | Vikas Hathwala 61* (40); Mohammed Siraj 4/20 (4 overs) | Palam A Ground, Delhi; Umpires: Saiyed Khalid and Navdeep Sidhu |
| Services won the toss and elected to field.; Tilak Varma (Hyderabad) made his T20 debut. | | | | Palam A Ground, Delhi; Umpires: Saiyed Khalid and Navdeep Sidhu |

| 2 March 2019 | Hyderabad; 57/2 (4.5 overs) | v | Uttarakhand | Match Abandoned |
| 09:00 IST Round 7 Scorecard | Hyderabad; 57/2 (4.5 overs) | v | Uttarakhand | Palam A Ground, Delhi; Umpires: Saiyed Khalid and Paschim Pathak |
| 09:00 IST Round 7 Scorecard | Tilak Varma 40* (15); Gaurav Singh 1/15 (1.5 overs) | | | Palam A Ground, Delhi; Umpires: Saiyed Khalid and Paschim Pathak |
| Uttarakhand won the toss and elected to field; Jamalpur Mallikarjun (Hyderabad); Gaurav Singh and Bhiguraj Pathania (Uttarakhand) all made their T20 debuts. | | | | Palam A Ground, Delhi; Umpires: Saiyed Khalid and Paschim Pathak |

==== Statistics ====
Batting

| Name | Mat | Inn | Runs | Ave | SR | HS | 100 | 50 |
|---|---|---|---|---|---|---|---|---|
| Akshath Reddy | 6 | 6 | 173 | 34.60 | 113.81 | 69* | 0 | 1 |
| Bavanaka Sandeep | 7 | 6 | 149 | 29.80 | 109.55 | 39 | 0 | 0 |
| Tanmay Agarwal | 6 | 6 | 127 | 25.40 | 107.62 | 38* | 0 | 0 |
| Ambati Rayudu | 4 | 4 | 67 | 16.75 | 89.33 | 29 | 0 | 0 |
| Rohit Rayudu | 6 | 4 | 65 | 21.66 | 116.07 | 47* | 0 | 0 |

Bowling

| Name | Mat | Inn | Wkts | Ave | Eco | BBI | SR | 4WI | 5WI |
|---|---|---|---|---|---|---|---|---|---|
| Mohammed Siraj | 7 | 6 | 9 | 18.11 | 7.76 | 4/20 | 14.0 | 1 | 0 |
| Chama Milind | 7 | 6 | 7 | 18.28 | 6.04 | 3/11 | 18.1 | 0 | 0 |
| Mehdi Hasan | 7 | 6 | 6 | 25.16 | 6.96 | 2/11 | 21.6 | 0 | 0 |
| Ravi Teja | 3 | 2 | 3 | 13.33 | 6.66 | 2/11 | 12.0 | 0 | 0 |
| Palakodeti Sairam | 6 | 5 | 3 | 37.33 | 7.00 | 2/38 | 32.0 | 0 | 0 |

== Senior women's team ==
=== Squads ===
| One Day League | T20 League |
|---|---|
| Sravanthi Naidu (c); D Ramya; Sunitha Anand (wk); Anuradha Naik (wk); Mamata Kanojia; Himani Yadav; Rachna S Kumar; Pranathi Reddy; Bhogi Shravani; K Anitha; Varsha Rajak; G Trisha; Lakshmi Prasanna; V Pooja; Yashashri | Sravanthi Naidu (c); Sneha More; Mamata Kanojia; Himani Yadav; D Ramya; K Anitha; Sunitha Anand (wk); Rachna S Kumar; Anuradha Naik (wk); Bhogi Shravani; Varsha Rajak; Bhavishya; E Chitra Maheshwari |

Senior Women's Challenger Trophy

Trisha got selected to the India Blue squad for the 2018–19 Senior Women's Challenger Trophy, a women's List A cricket tournament in India.

=== One Day League ===
Senior Women's One Day League, a Women's List A cricket tournament in India, fixtures were announced by BCCI on 26 October 2018 and the Hyderabad was placed in Elite Group C. The squad was selected on 12 November with Sravanthi Naidu leading the team as they faced the Odisha in their first match of the One Day League at Cuttack on 1 December.

The Hyderabad started the tournament on the winning note as they defeated the Odisha by 28 runs. The Hyderabad posted the total of 183/7 in 50 overs after winning the toss and electing to bat. Skipper Sravanthi was the top-scorer for the Hyderabad with an unbeaten knock of 49 while their opener, Trisha chipped in with 76-ball 47. In reply, the Odisha were restricted to 155/8 with Trisha and Himani Yadav taking two wickets each. An all-round performance from Trisha helped the Hyderabad defeat the Rajasthan by 78 runs in their second match of the tournament. The 107-run second wicket partnership between Trisha and Mamata Kanojia helped the Hyderabad post 207/5 in 50 overs with both scoring the half-centuries before the five-wicket haul from Trisha helped the Hyderabad bowl out the Rajasthan for 129. The Hyderabad were bowled out for 148 by the Himachal Pradesh despite the useful contributions from their middle order, Kanojia and Vanka Pooja, after they lost the toss and were put to bat in their third match. Neena Chaudhary's unbeaten knock of 49 completed the chase for the Himachal Pradesh who won the match in 37.5 overs with four wickets to spare. The Hyderabad bounced back from the defeat to beat the Uttar Pradesh by 53 runs and record their third win of the tournament. The half-centuries from Trisha and Kanojia helped the Hyderabad post the target of 212 to the Uttar Pradesh before the latter were bowled out for 158 with Trisha and Yadav sharing seven wickets between them.

The second consecutive half-century from Kanojia and a collective bowling effort helped the Hyderabad win their fifth match against the Jharkhand by 24 runs. Despite an early setback with Trisha's dismissal, an unbeaten half-century from Kanojia helped the Hyderabad post 155/8 in 50 overs while quick wickets during the Jharkhand's innings troubled them as they were eventually bowled out for 131. The three-wicket haul from Varsha Choudhary and three run-outs helped the Madhya Pradesh restrict the Hyderabad to 148/9 in 50 overs while the half-century from Tamanna Nigam helped the Madhya Pradesh complete the chase with four wickets to spare as the Hyderabad were handed their second defeat of the tournament in six matches. The Hyderabad suffered the second consecutive defeat as they fell short of target by 15 runs against the Assam despite the useful knocks from Vanka and Sunitha Anand. Earlier, Bhogi Shravani and Yadav shared five wickets between them to restrict the Assam to 205. The final group match against the Jammu & Kashmir was washed out which resulted in finishing fifth in the group stage and failing to advance to the knockout stage for the Hyderabad.

==== Points table ====
Elite Group C

| Team | Pld | W | L | T | NR | Pts | NRR |
|---|---|---|---|---|---|---|---|
| Himachal | 8 | 8 | 0 | 0 | 0 | 32 | +1.322 |
| Odisha | 8 | 5 | 3 | 0 | 0 | 20 | +0.076 |
| Uttar Pradesh | 8 | 5 | 3 | 0 | 0 | 20 | +0.417 |
| Madhya Pradesh | 8 | 4 | 3 | 0 | 1 | 18 | +0.660 |
| Hyderabad | 8 | 4 | 3 | 0 | 1 | 18 | +0.340 |
| Jharkhand | 8 | 4 | 3 | 0 | 1 | 18 | +0.700 |
| Assam | 8 | 3 | 5 | 0 | 0 | 12 | –0.664 |
| Rajasthan | 8 | 1 | 7 | 0 | 0 | 4 | –1.703 |
| Jammu & Kashmir | 8 | 0 | 7 | 0 | 1 | 2 | –1.874 |

- Top two teams advanced to the knockout stage and are promoted to the Elite Groups A and B.
- Bottom ranked team is relegated to the Plate Group for the next season.

Points system : W = 4, D/A = 2, L = 0.

==== Matches ====
Group Stage

| 1 December 2018 | Hyderabad; 183/7 (50 overs) | v | Odisha; 155/8 (50 overs) | Hyderabad won by 28 runs |
| 09:00 IST Round 1 Scorecard | Hyderabad; 183/7 (50 overs) | v | Odisha; 155/8 (50 overs) | Nimpur Ground, Cuttack; Umpires: Kannur Swaroopanand and Janani N |
| 09:00 IST Round 1 Scorecard | Sravanthi Naidu 49* (76); Madhusmita Behera 2/25 (10 overs) | | Sushree Dibyadarshini 50* (62); G Trisha 2/23 (10 overs) | Nimpur Ground, Cuttack; Umpires: Kannur Swaroopanand and Janani N |
| Hyderabad won the toss and elected to bat. | | | | Nimpur Ground, Cuttack; Umpires: Kannur Swaroopanand and Janani N |

| 2 December 2018 | Hyderabad; 207/5 (50 overs) | v | Rajasthan; 129 (49.1 overs) | Hyderabad won by 78 runs |
| 09:00 IST Round 2 Scorecard | Hyderabad; 207/5 (50 overs) | v | Rajasthan; 129 (49.1 overs) | Nimpur Ground, Cuttack; Umpires: Kannur Swaroopanand and R Rajesh Kannan |
| 09:00 IST Round 2 Scorecard | Mamata Kanojia 88 (109); A D Garg 2/25 (7 overs) | | A D Garg 61 (128); G Trisha 5/17 (10 overs) | Nimpur Ground, Cuttack; Umpires: Kannur Swaroopanand and R Rajesh Kannan |
| Hyderabad won the toss and elected to bat. | | | | Nimpur Ground, Cuttack; Umpires: Kannur Swaroopanand and R Rajesh Kannan |

| 5 December 2018 | Hyderabad; 148 (49.5 overs) | v | Himachal Pradesh; 152/6 (37.5 overs) | Himachal Pradesh won by 4 wickets |
| 09:00 IST Round 3 Scorecard | Hyderabad; 148 (49.5 overs) | v | Himachal Pradesh; 152/6 (37.5 overs) | B.O.S.E. Ground, Cuttack; Umpires: Kannur Swaroopanand and Mohit Krishnadas |
| 09:00 IST Round 3 Scorecard | V Pooja 34 (71); Renuka Singh 2/20 (6 overs) | | Neena Choudhary 49* (81); Himani Yadav 3/27 (3 overs) | B.O.S.E. Ground, Cuttack; Umpires: Kannur Swaroopanand and Mohit Krishnadas |
| Himachal Pradesh won the toss and elected to field. | | | | B.O.S.E. Ground, Cuttack; Umpires: Kannur Swaroopanand and Mohit Krishnadas |

| 8 December 2018 | Hyderabad; 211/3 (50 overs) | v | Uttar Pradesh; 158 (44.4 overs) | Hyderabad won by 53 runs |
| 09:00 IST Round 4 Scorecard | Hyderabad; 211/3 (50 overs) | v | Uttar Pradesh; 158 (44.4 overs) | Sunshine Ground, Cuttack; Umpires: Janani N and Mohit Krishnadas |
| 09:00 IST Round 4 Scorecard | Mamata Kanojia 69* (93); Tanu Kala 2/38 (10 overs) | | Kshama 28 (38); Himani Yadav 4/25 (7.4 overs) | Sunshine Ground, Cuttack; Umpires: Janani N and Mohit Krishnadas |
| Hyderabad won the toss and elected to bat. | | | | Sunshine Ground, Cuttack; Umpires: Janani N and Mohit Krishnadas |

| 10 December 2018 | Hyderabad; 155/8 (50 overs) | v | Jharkhand; 131 (47.5 overs) | Hyderabad won by 24 runs |
| 09:00 IST Round 5 Scorecard | Hyderabad; 155/8 (50 overs) | v | Jharkhand; 131 (47.5 overs) | B.O.S.E. Ground, Cuttack; Umpires: R Rajesh Kannan and Bahuleyan Viswajith |
| 09:00 IST Round 5 Scorecard | Mamata Kanojia 72* (100); Mamta Paswan 3/45 (10 overs) | | Niharika Prasad 38 (69); Yashashri 2/7 (6 overs) | B.O.S.E. Ground, Cuttack; Umpires: R Rajesh Kannan and Bahuleyan Viswajith |
| Hyderabad won the toss and elected to bat. | | | | B.O.S.E. Ground, Cuttack; Umpires: R Rajesh Kannan and Bahuleyan Viswajith |

| 12 December 2018 | Hyderabad; 148/8 (50 overs) | v | Madhya Pradesh; 149/4 (48.3 overs) | Madhya Pradesh won by 6 wickets |
| 09:00 IST Round 6 Scorecard | Hyderabad; 148/8 (50 overs) | v | Madhya Pradesh; 149/4 (48.3 overs) | Sunshine Ground, Cuttack; Umpires: R Rajesh Kannan and Bahuleyan Viswajith |
| 09:00 IST Round 6 Scorecard | Himani Yadav 40 (65); Varsha Choudhary 3/22 (10 overs) | | Tamanna Nigam 54 (106); Himani Yadav 3/33 (9.3 overs) | Sunshine Ground, Cuttack; Umpires: R Rajesh Kannan and Bahuleyan Viswajith |
| Hyderabad won the toss and elected to bat. | | | | Sunshine Ground, Cuttack; Umpires: R Rajesh Kannan and Bahuleyan Viswajith |

| 16 December 2018 | Assam; 205 (49.2 overs) | v | Hyderabad; 190/8 (50 overs) | Assam won by 15 runs |
| 09:00 IST Round 7 Scorecard | Assam; 205 (49.2 overs) | v | Hyderabad; 190/8 (50 overs) | Sunshine Ground, Cuttack; Umpires: Ashish V Bhanushali and Janani N |
| 09:00 IST Round 7 Scorecard | Rajni Lodhi 61 (100); Bhogi Shravani 3/44 (9 overs) | | V Pooja 42 (75); Anita Lodhi 2/17 (5 overs) | Sunshine Ground, Cuttack; Umpires: Ashish V Bhanushali and Janani N |
| Assam won the toss and elected to bat. | | | | Sunshine Ground, Cuttack; Umpires: Ashish V Bhanushali and Janani N |

| 18 December 2018 | Hyderabad | v | Jammu & Kashmir | Match Abandoned |
| 09:00 IST Round 8 Scorecard | Hyderabad | v | Jammu & Kashmir | Nimpur Ground, Cuttack; Umpires: Janani N and Mohit Krishnadas |
| No toss. | | | | Nimpur Ground, Cuttack; Umpires: Janani N and Mohit Krishnadas |

==== Statistics ====
Batting

| Name | Mat | Inn | Runs | Ave | SR | HS | 100 | 50 |
|---|---|---|---|---|---|---|---|---|
| Mamata Kanojia | 7 | 7 | 303 | 60.60 | 61.21 | 88 | 0 | 3 |
| G Trisha | 7 | 7 | 198 | 28.29 | 62.26 | 69 | 0 | 2 |

Bowling

| Name | Mat | Inn | Wkts | Ave | Eco | BBI | SR | 4WI | 5WI |
|---|---|---|---|---|---|---|---|---|---|
| Himani Yadav | 7 | 7 | 16 | 12.12 | 3.80 | 4/25 | 19.12 | 1 | 0 |
| G Trisha | 7 | 7 | 11 | 13.72 | 2.31 | 5/17 | 35.63 | 0 | 1 |
| Bhogi Shravani | 6 | 6 | 7 | 18.71 | 3.87 | 3/44 | 29.00 | 0 | 0 |

=== T20 League ===
Senior Women's T20 League, a Women's Twenty20 cricket tournament in India, fixtures were announced by BCCI on 26 October 2018 and the Hyderabad was placed in Group D.

==== Points table ====
Group D

| Team | P | W | L | T | NR | Pts | NRR |
|---|---|---|---|---|---|---|---|
| Karnataka | 6 | 5 | 0 | 0 | 1 | 22 | +2.089 |
| Punjab | 5 | 5 | 0 | 0 | 1 | 22 | +1.662 |
| Hyderabad | 6 | 3 | 2 | 0 | 1 | 14 | +0.168 |
| Tripura | 6 | 2 | 3 | 0 | 1 | 10 | –0.436 |
| Goa | 6 | 2 | 4 | 0 | 0 | 8 | +0.615 |
| Uttarakhand | 6 | 1 | 4 | 0 | 1 | 6 | –1.544 |
| Jammu & Kashmir | 6 | 0 | 5 | 0 | 1 | 2 | –2.929 |

- Top two teams advanced to the Super League.

Points system : W = 4, D/A = 2, L = 0.

==== Matches ====
Group Stage

| 20 February 2019 | Hyderabad; 107/8 (20 overs) | v | Goa; 97/9 (20 overs) | Hyderabad won by 10 runs |
| 10:00 IST Round 1 Scorecard | Hyderabad; 107/8 (20 overs) | v | Goa; 97/9 (20 overs) | Maharaja Bir Bikram College Stadium, Agartala; Umpires: K R Vasuki and M Mohamed Rafi |
| 10:00 IST Round 1 Scorecard | K Anitha 37 (26); Sunanda 3/32 (3 overs) | | Nikita 22 (25); Sravanthi Naidu 2/31 (4 overs) | Maharaja Bir Bikram College Stadium, Agartala; Umpires: K R Vasuki and M Mohamed Rafi |
| Goa won the toss and elected to field. | | | | Maharaja Bir Bikram College Stadium, Agartala; Umpires: K R Vasuki and M Mohamed Rafi |

| 21 February 2019 | Hyderabad; 115/7 (20 overs) | v | Karnataka; 116/5 (17.4 overs) | Karnataka won by 5 wickets |
| 10:00 IST Round 2 Scorecard | Hyderabad; 115/7 (20 overs) | v | Karnataka; 116/5 (17.4 overs) | Police Training Academy Ground, Agartala; Umpires: M Mohamed Rafi and Arun Kumar Basa |
| 10:00 IST Round 2 Scorecard | Mamata Kanojia 40 (38); G Divya 2/14 (2 overs) | | C Pratyusha 35 (22); Himani Yadav 2/41 (3.4 overs) | Police Training Academy Ground, Agartala; Umpires: M Mohamed Rafi and Arun Kumar Basa |
| Karnataka won the toss and elected to field. | | | | Police Training Academy Ground, Agartala; Umpires: M Mohamed Rafi and Arun Kumar Basa |

| 23 February 2019 | Punjab; 124/6 (20 overs) | v | Hyderabad; 101/7 (20 overs) | Punjab won by 23 runs |
| 10:00 IST Round 3 Scorecard | Punjab; 124/6 (20 overs) | v | Hyderabad; 101/7 (20 overs) | Maharaja Bir Bikram College Stadium, Agartala; Umpires: M Mohamed Rafi and Milind Pathak |
| 10:00 IST Round 3 Scorecard | Jasia Akhtar 60 (49); K Anitha 2/13 (4 overs) | | Sravanthi Naidu 29 (38); Neelam Bisht 2/18 (4 overs) | Maharaja Bir Bikram College Stadium, Agartala; Umpires: M Mohamed Rafi and Milind Pathak |
| Punjab won the toss and elected to bat. | | | | Maharaja Bir Bikram College Stadium, Agartala; Umpires: M Mohamed Rafi and Milind Pathak |

| 26 February 2019 | Tripura; 56/8 (8 overs) | v | Hyderabad; 58/4 (7.2 overs) | Hyderabad won by 6 wickets |
| 10:00 IST Round 4 Scorecard | Tripura; 56/8 (8 overs) | v | Hyderabad; 58/4 (7.2 overs) | Police Training Academy Ground, Agartala; Umpires: K R Vasuki and M Mohamed Rafi |
| 10:00 IST Round 4 Scorecard | Indra Rani Jamatia 18 (16); Varsha Rajak 3/4 (1 over) | | Sunitha Anand 14* (5); M K Rabidas 1/13 (2 overs) | Police Training Academy Ground, Agartala; Umpires: K R Vasuki and M Mohamed Rafi |
| Hyderabad won the toss and elected to field. | | | | Police Training Academy Ground, Agartala; Umpires: K R Vasuki and M Mohamed Rafi |

| 27 February 2019 | Hyderabad | v | Uttarakhand | Match Abandoned |
| 10:00 IST Round 5 Scorecard | Hyderabad | v | Uttarakhand | Police Training Academy Ground, Agartala; Umpires: K R Vasuki and M Mohamed Rafi |
| No toss. | | | | Police Training Academy Ground, Agartala; Umpires: K R Vasuki and M Mohamed Rafi |

| 1 March 2019 | Jammu & Kashmir; 95/4 (20 overs) | v | Hyderabad; 96/3 (14 overs) | Hyderabad won by 7 wickets |
| 10:00 IST Round 6 Scorecard | Jammu & Kashmir; 95/4 (20 overs) | v | Hyderabad; 96/3 (14 overs) | Maharaja Bir Bikram College Stadium, Agartala; Umpires: Arun Kumar Basa and Milind Pathak |
| 10:00 IST Round 6 Scorecard | Sarla Devi 53* (51); Bhogi Shravani 2/10 (3 overs) | | Himani Yadav 44* (38); Bismah Hassan 2/25 (4 overs) | Maharaja Bir Bikram College Stadium, Agartala; Umpires: Arun Kumar Basa and Milind Pathak |
| Hyderabad won the toss and elected to field. | | | | Maharaja Bir Bikram College Stadium, Agartala; Umpires: Arun Kumar Basa and Milind Pathak |

==== Statistics ====
Batting

| Name | Mat | Inn | Runs | Ave | SR | HS | 100 | 50 |
|---|---|---|---|---|---|---|---|---|
| Mamata Kanojia | 5 | 5 | 101 | 20.20 | 84.16 | 40 | 0 | 0 |
| Sravanthi Naidu | 5 | 5 | 78 | 15.60 | 82.97 | 29 | 0 | 0 |

Bowling

| Name | Mat | Inn | Wkts | Ave | Eco | BBI | SR | 4WI | 5WI |
|---|---|---|---|---|---|---|---|---|---|
| Bhogi Shravani | 5 | 5 | 7 | 15.28 | 6.29 | 2/10 | 14.57 | 0 | 0 |
| Varsha Rajak | 5 | 4 | 5 | 8.00 | 8.00 | 3/4 | 6.00 | 0 | 0 |
| Himani Yadav | 5 | 5 | 5 | 19.20 | 6.54 | 2/22 | 17.60 | 0 | 0 |

== See also ==
Hyderabad cricket team
Hyderabad women's cricket team
Hyderabad Cricket Association
