= 2018–19 Vijay Hazare Trophy Group B =

Cricket tournament

- Dates: 19 September – 8 October 2018
- Administrator: BCCI
- Cricket format: List A cricket
- Tournament format(s): Round-robin and Playoff format
- Participants: 9

The 2018–19 Vijay Hazare Trophy was the 17th season of the Vijay Hazare Trophy, a List A cricket tournament in India. It was contested by the 37 domestic cricket teams of India, with nine teams in Group B. The group stage started on 19 September 2018, with the top five teams across Group A and Group B progressing to the quarter-finals of the competition. Delhi, Andhra and Hyderabad all progressed from Group B to the knock-out phase of the tournament.

== Points table ==
Pos	Team	Pld	W	L	T	NR	Pts	NRR
2	Delhi	8	6	1	0	1	26	1.258
4	Andhra	8	6	1	0	1	26	0.100
5	Hyderabad	8	5	2	0	1	22	0.539
8	Kerala	8	4	3	0	1	18	−0.165
9	Chhattisgarh	8	4	4	0	0	16	0.278
13	Saurashtra	8	3	5	0	0	12	−0.475
14	Odisha	8	2	5	0	1	10	−0.181
15	Uttar Pradesh	8	1	5	0	2	8	−0.378
17	Madhya Pradesh	8	1	6	0	1	6	−0.984

- Top five teams across Groups A and B advanced to the knockout stage.
- Bottom two teams across Groups A and B relegated to the Elite Group C for the next season.

== Fixtures ==
=== Round 1 ===
19 September 2018
9:00
Scorecard

Madhya Pradesh; 231 (48.2 overs)	v	Hyderabad; 235/3 (47.4 overs)
Rajat Patidar 49 (63); Mohammed Siraj 3/42 (9.2 overs)		Tanmay Agarwal 83 (109); Rameez Khan 2/34 (6 overs)

Hyderabad won by 7 wickets
Palam B Ground, Delhi
Umpires: Amit Bansal and Rajeev Godara

- Madhya Pradesh won the toss and elected to bat.
- Aryaman Birla and Ajay Rohera (Madhya Pradesh) both made their List A debuts.

19 September 2018
9:00
Scorecard

Saurashtra; 303/9 (50 overs)	v	Uttar Pradesh; 278 (49.1 overs)
Sheldon Jackson 107 (108); Shivam Mavi 5/73 (10 overs)		Akshdeep Nath 62 (53); Jaydev Unadkat 3/42 (10 overs)

Saurashtra won by 25 runs
Feroz Shah Kotla Ground, Delhi

- Uttar Pradesh won the toss and elected to field.
- Priyam Garg (Uttar Pradesh) made his List A debut.
- Shivam Mavi (Uttar Pradesh) took a hat-trick.

19 September 2018
9:00
Scorecard

Andhra; 190 (49 overs)	v	Kerala; 183 (49.1 overs)
Bodapati Sumanth 79 (104); Sudhesan Midhun 3/56 (10 overs)		Sachin Baby 57 (84); Karn Sharma 3/37 (10 overs)

Andhra won by 7 runs
Palam A Ground, Delhi
Umpires: Vijay Sharma and Somnath Jha

- Andhra won the toss and elected to bat.
- Shoaib Md Khan (Andhra) and Akshay Chandran (Kerala) both made their List A debuts.

=== Round 2 ===
20 September 2018
9:00
Scorecard

Chhattisgarh; 268/7 (50 overs)	v	Madhya Pradesh; 146 (38.2 overs)
Harpreet Singh 91 (110); Ishwar Pandey 4/45 (10 overs)		Anshul Tripathi 59 (70); Pankaj Rao 3/14 (6.2 overs)

Chhattisgarh won by 122 runs
Palam B Stadium, New Delhi
Umpires: Sanjay Kumar Singh and Kamlesh Sharma

- Chhattisgarh won the toss and elected to bat.

20 September 2018
9:00
Scorecard

Odisha; 184/9 (50 overs)	v	Andhra; 186/4 (47.1 overs)
Sujit Lenka 55 (91); Karn Sharma 3/29 (10 overs)		Ashwin Hebbar 92* (130); Pappu Roy 2/16 (10 overs)

Andhra won by 6 wickets
Palam A Stadium, New Delhi
Umpires: Amit Bansal and Rajeev Godara

- Odisha won the toss and elected to bat.
- Manish Golamaru (Andhra), Rajesh Mohanty, Pappu Roy and Kanwar Singh Chohan (Odisha) all made their List A debuts.

20 September 2018
9:00
Scorecard

Saurashtra; 237 (49.3 overs)	v	Delhi; 238/5 (46 overs)
Sheldon Jackson 62 (78); Suboth Bhati 5/24 (7.3 overs)		Himmat Singh 74* (93); Jaydev Unadkat 2/36 (9 overs)

Delhi won by 5 wickets
Feroz Shah Kotla Ground, Delhi
Umpires: Abhijit Deshmukh

- Saurashtra won the toss and elected to bat.
- Pranshu Vijayran and Simarjeet Singh (Delhi) both made their List A debuts.

=== Round 3 ===
21 September 2018
9:00
Scorecard

Uttar Pradesh; 250 (49.2 overs)	v	Chhattisgarh; 252/6 (49.1 overs)
Upendra Yadav 85 (99); Jatin Saxena 4/56 (10 overs)		Amandeep Khare 78* (90); Shivam Chaudhary 1/24 (6 overs)

Chhattisgarh won by 4 wickets
Palam B Stadium, New Delhi
Umpires: Amit Bansal and Kamlesh Sharma

- Uttar Pradesh won the toss and elected to bat.
- Shiva Singh and Yash Dayal (Uttar Pradesh) both made their List A debuts.

21 September 2018
9:00
Scorecard

Hyderabad; 205 (47.4 overs)	v	Delhi; 178/4 (30.4 overs)
Bavanaka Sandeep 51 (67); Manan Sharma 4/42 (9 overs)		Nitish Rana 91* (87); Ravi Kiran 2/24 (5 overs)

Delhi won by 6 wickets (VJD method)
Feroz Shah Kotla Ground, Delhi
Umpires: Akshay Totre and Abhijit Deshmukh

- Hyderabad won the toss and elected to bat.

21 September 2018
9:00
Scorecard

Odisha; 117 (34.4 overs)	v	Kerala; 118/4 (37.3 overs)
Subhranshu Senapati 26 (49); Akshay Chandran 4/29 (10 overs)		Sachin Baby 41 (78); Pappu Roy 2/25 (10 overs)

Kerala won by 6 wickets
Palam A Stadium, New Delhi
Umpires: Sanjay Kumar Singh and Somnath Jha

- Kerala won the toss and elected to field.

=== Round 4 ===
23 September 2018
9:00
Scorecard

Chhattisgarh; 138 (39.5 overs)	v	Kerala; 133/4 (40 overs)
Amandeep Khare 36* (53); Jalaj Saxena 4/31 (10 overs)		Jalaj Saxena 58* (120); Jatin Saxena 1/22 (8 overs)

Kerala won by 6 wickets (VJD method)
Feroz Shah Kotla Ground, Delhi
Umpires: Sanjay Kumar Singh and Kamlesh Sharma

- Kerala won the toss and elected to field.

23 September 2018
9:00
Scorecard

Hyderabad; 196/9 (45 overs)	v	Saurashtra; 110/3 (18.5 overs)
Bavanaka Sandeep 76 (83); Jaydev Unadkat 4/33 (8 overs)		Robin Uthappa 35 (39); Mehdi Hasan 2/13 (3 overs)

Saurashtra won by 7 wickets (VJD method)
Palam B Stadium, New Delhi
Umpires: Abhijit Deshmukh and Somnath Jha

- Hyderabad won the toss and elected to bat.
- Yuvraj Chudasama (Saurashtra) made his List A debut.

23 September 2018
9:00
Scorecard

Uttar Pradesh; 95/2 (15 overs)	v	Odisha
Upendra Yadav 42 (21); Pappu Roy 1/21 (4 overs)

No result
Palam A Stadium, New Delhi
Umpires: Amit Bansal and Rajeev Godara

- Odisha won the toss and elected to field.
- Rain during Uttar Pradesh's innings prevented any further play.

=== Round 5 ===
24 September 2018
9:00
Scorecard

Andhra	v	Hyderabad

Match abandoned
Palam B Stadium, New Delhi
Umpires: Abhijit Deshmukh and Somnath Jha

- No toss.
- No play was possible due to rain.

24 September 2018
9:00
Scorecard

Delhi	v	Uttar Pradesh

Match abandoned
Palam A Stadium, New Delhi
Umpires: Akshay Totre and Rajeev Godara

- No toss.
- No play was possible due to rain.

24 September 2018
9:00
Scorecard

Madhya Pradesh	v	Kerala

No result
Feroz Shah Kotla Ground, Delhi
Umpires: Sanjay Kumar Singh and Kamlesh Sharma

- Kerala won the toss and elected to field.
- No play was possible due to rain.

=== Round 6 ===
26 September 2018
9:00
Scorecard

Odisha; 249/4 (48 overs)	v	Delhi; 240 (48 overs)
Biplab Samantray 63 (81); Simarjeet Singh 1/27 (5 overs)		Gautam Gambhir 44 (56); Deepak Behera 2/25 (7.4 overs)

Odisha won by 9 runs
Palam B Stadium, New Delhi
Umpires: Tapan Sharma and Kamlesh Sharma

- Odisha won the toss and elected to bat.

26 September 2018
9:00
Scorecard

Chhattisgarh; 248/8 (50 overs)	v	Andhra; 249/8 (50 overs)
Ashutosh Singh 110 (125); Siva Kumar 2/42 (10 overs); Shoaib Md Khan 2/42 (10 overs)		Karn Sharma 55 (29); Pankaj Rao 2/49 (10 overs)

Andhra won by 2 wickets
Feroz Shah Kotla Ground, Delhi
Umpires: Sanjay Kumar Singh and Somnath Jha

- Andhra won the toss and elected to field.

26 September 2018
9:00
Scorecard

Madhya Pradesh; 136 (45.5 overs)	v	Saurashtra; 137/3 (40.3 overs)
Saransh Jain 32 (46); Jaydev Unadkat 4/23 (9 overs)		Arpit Vasavada 38* (69); Kumar Kartikeya 1/28 (10 overs)

Saurashtra won by 7 wickets
Palam A Stadium, New Delhi
Umpires: Amit Bansal and Rajeev Godara

- Madhya Pradesh won the toss and elected to bat.
- Kumar Kartikeya (Madhya Pradesh) made his List A debut.

=== Round 7 ===
28 September 2018
9:00
Scorecard

Uttar Pradesh; 130 (39.1 overs)	v	Hyderabad; 134/1 (35.2 overs)
Suresh Raina 53 (64); Mehdi Hasan 5/20 (10 overs)		Akshath Reddy 64 (89); Shiva Singh 1/31 (10 overs)

Hyderabad won by 9 wickets
Palam A Stadium, New Delhi
Umpires: Amit Bansal and Tapan Sharma

- Uttar Pradesh won the toss and elected to bat.
- Abhishek Goswami and Rajat Goel (Uttar Pradesh) both made their List A debuts.

28 September 2018
9:00
Scorecard

Delhi; 392/2 (50 overs)	v	Kerala; 227/8 (50 overs)
Gautam Gambhir 151* (104); VA Jagadeesh 1/51 (9 overs)		VA Jagadeesh 59* (69); Pawan Negi 3/41 (10 overs)

Delhi won by 165 runs
Feroz Shah Kotla Ground, Delhi
Umpires: Nikhil Patwardhan and Rajeev Godara

- Kerala won the toss and elected to field.

28 September 2018
9:00
Scorecard

Madhya Pradesh; 277 (49.3 overs)	v	Odisha; 276/8 (50 overs)
Yash Dubey 75 (77); Deepak Behera 3/38 (8.3 overs)		Abhishek Raut 55* (53); Rameez Khan 4/49 (10 overs)

Madhya Pradesh won by 1 run
Palam B Stadium, New Delhi
Umpires: Somnath Jha and Navdeep Singh

- Madhya Pradesh won the toss and elected to bat.
- Yash Dubey (Madhya Pradesh) and Krishna Palai (Odisha) both made their List A debuts.

=== Round 8 ===
30 September 2018
9:00
Scorecard

Madhya Pradesh; 277/7 (50 overs)	v	Uttar Pradesh; 280/5 (49.3 overs)
Venkatesh Iyer 83 (72); Shiva Singh 2/49 (10 overs)		Samarth Singh 70 (87); Saransh Jain 3/29 (9 overs)

Uttar Pradesh won by 5 wickets
Feroz Shah Kotla Ground, Delhi
Umpires: Amit Bansal and Rajeev Godara

- Uttar Pradesh won the toss and elected to field.

30 September 2018
9:00
Scorecard

Saurashtra; 214/7 (50 overs)	v	Andhra; 215/4 (48.3 overs)
Arpit Vasavada 55 (71); Girinath Reddy 2/44 (8 overs)		Prasanth Kumar 71 (83); Chirag Jani 1/25 (6.3 overs)

Andhra won by 6 wickets
Palam B Stadium, New Delhi
Umpires: Somnath Jha and Navdeep Singh

- Saurashtra won the toss and elected to bat.

30 September 2018
9:00
Scorecard

Hyderabad; 222/9 (50 overs)	v	Chhattisgarh; 121 (33.3 overs)
Rohit Rayudu 75 (102); Pankaj Rao 3/41 (10 overs)		Ashutosh Singh 38 (60); Mehdi Hasan 3/19 (7.3 overs)

Hyderabad won by 101 runs
Palam A Stadium, New Delhi
Umpires: Sanjay Kumar Singh and Nikhil Patwardhan

- Chhattisgarh won the toss and elected to field.
- Rishabh Tiwari and Ajay Mandal (Chhattisgarh) both made their List A debuts.

=== Round 9 ===
2 October 2018
9:00
Scorecard

Delhi; 314/5 (50 overs)	v	Andhra; 241 (49.5 overs)
Himmat Singh 102* (75); Girinath Reddy 2/67 (9 overs)		Prasanth Kumar 54 (69); Kulwant Khejroliya 2/29 (6 overs)

Delhi won by 73 runs
Feroz Shah Kotla Ground, Delhi
Umpires: Nikhil Patwardhan and Tapan Sharma

- Andhra won the toss and elected to field.

2 October 2018
9:00
Scorecard

Kerala; 189/6 (50 overs)	v	Hyderabad; 190/3 (46.4 overs)
VA Jagadeesh 62 (92); Palakodeti Sairam 2/27 (10 overs)		Rohit Rayudu 57* (86); Jalaj S Saxena 2/22 (10 overs)

Hyderabad won by 7 wickets
Palam A Stadium, New Delhi
Umpires: Sanjay Kumar Singh and Navdeep Singh

- Kerala won the toss and elected to bat.

2 October 2018
9:00
Scorecard

Chhattisgarh; 212 (49.5 overs)	v	Odisha; 164 (41 overs)
Harpreet Singh 43 (74); Anurag Sarangi 3/22 (7 overs)		Biplab Samantray 38 (71); Pankaj Rao 3/15 (7 overs)

Chhattisgarh won by 48 runs
Palam B Stadium, New Delhi
Umpires: Somnath Jha and Virender Sharma

- Chhattisgarh won the toss and elected to bat.
- Shakeeb Ahmed (Chhattisgarh) made his List A debut.

=== Round 10 ===
4 October 2018
9:00
Scorecard

Delhi; 284/8 (50 overs)	v	Madhya Pradesh; 209 (42.4 overs)
Nitish Rana 107 (98); Mihir Hirwani 4/49 (10 overs)		Venkatesh Iyer 53 (71); Lalit Yadav 5/25 (10 overs)

Delhi won by 75 runs
Palam A Stadium, New Delhi
Umpires: Rajeev Godara and Navdeep Singh

- Delhi won the toss and elected to bat.

4 October 2018
9:00
Scorecard

Kerala; 228 (50 overs)	v	Uttar Pradesh; 227 (49.5 overs)
VA Jagadeesh 82 (101); Saurabh Kumar 3/31 (10 overs)		Suresh Raina 66 (69); Jalaj S Saxena 2/31 (10 overs)

Kerala won by 1 run
Palam B Stadium, New Delhi
Umpires: Amit Bansal and Rajesh Timaney

- Uttar Pradesh won the toss and elected to field.

4 October 2018
9:00
Scorecard

Odisha; 197 (49.2 overs)	v	Saurashtra; 145 (38.4 overs)
Biplab Samantray 62 (79); Jaydev Unadkat 3/39 (10 overs)		Sheldon Jackson 40 (50); Govinda Poddar 3/33 (8.4 overs)

Odisha won by 52 runs
Feroz Shah Kotla Ground, Delhi
Umpires: Sanjay Kumar Singh and Nikhil Patwardhan

- Odisha won the toss and elected to bat.

=== Round 11 ===
6 October 2018
9:00
Scorecard

Uttar Pradesh; 330/4 (50 overs)	v	Andhra; 331/9 (49.3 overs)
Akshdeep Nath 119* (79); Karn Sharma 1/41 (10 overs)		Dwaraka Ravi Teja 78* (82); Akshdeep Nath 3/44 (8 overs)

Andhra won by 1 wicket
Palam B Stadium, New Delhi
Umpires: Sanjay Kumar Singh and Navdeep Singh

- Andhra won the toss and elected to field.

6 October 2018
9:00
Scorecard

Saurashtra; 110 (34.4 overs)	v	Chhattisgarh; 111/1 (24.2 overs)
Arpit Vasavada 34 (55); Sumit Ruikar 6/26 (9 overs)		Rishabh Tiwari 56* (90)

Chhattisgarh won by 9 wickets
Palam A Stadium, New Delhi
Umpires: Amit Bansal and Rajesh Timaney

- Saurashtra won the toss and elected to bat.
- Jay Chauhan (Saurashtra) made his List A debut.

6 October 2018
9:00
Scorecard

Odisha; 247/8 (50 overs)	v	Hyderabad; 250/9 (49.2 overs)
Govinda Poddar 93 (108); Chama Milind 6/43 (10 overs)		Tanmay Agarwal 76 (89); Pappu Roy 3/38 (10 overs)

Hyderabad won by 1 wicket
Feroz Shah Kotla Ground, Delhi
Umpires: Rajeev Godara and Somnath Jha

- Odisha won the toss and elected to bat.

=== Round 12 ===
8 October 2018
9:00
Scorecard

Delhi; 245/9 (50 overs)	v	Chhattisgarh; 201 (45.1 overs)
Lakshay Thareja 53 (72); Shivendra Singh 2/31 (10 overs)		Ajay Mandal 40 (41); Lalit Yadav 2/41 (10 overs)

Delhi won by 44 runs
Feroz Shah Kotla Ground, Delhi
Umpires: Rajesh Timaney and Navdeep Singh

- Delhi won the toss and elected to bat.
- Aishwarya Mourya (Chhattisgarh) and Lakshay Thareja (Delhi) both made their List A debuts.

8 October 2018
9:00
Scorecard

Kerala; 316/7 (50 overs)	v	Saurashtra; 270 (49.3 overs)
Sachin Baby 93 (72); Jay Chauhan 3/63 (10 overs)		Samarth Vyas 91 (96); Basil Thampi 4/52 (10 overs)

Kerala won by 46 runs
Palam B Stadium, New Delhi
Umpires: Amit Bansal and Nikhil Patwardhan

- Saurashtra won the toss and elected to field.

8 October 2018
9:00
Scorecard

Madhya Pradesh; 155 (41.4 overs)	v	Andhra; 156/3 (34.5 overs)
Anand Singh 70 (103); Shoaib Md Khan 4/16 (7.4 overs)		Ricky Bhui 56* (74); Kumar Kartikeya 3/28 (10 overs)

Andhra won by 7 wickets
Palam A Stadium, New Delhi
Umpires: Rajeev Godara and Somnath Jha

- Madhya Pradesh won the toss and elected to bat.
- Ankush Singh (Madhya Pradesh) made his List A debut.
