= Vaibhav Rawal =

Indian cricketer (born 1991)

Personal information
- Full name: Vaibhav Prem Rawal
- Born: 9 November 1991 (age 35); Delhi, India
- Batting: Left-handed
- Bowling: Leg break
- Role: Batsman

Domestic team information
- Years: Team
- 2012–present: Delhi

Career statistics
Competition	First-class	List A
Matches	5	1
Runs scored	381	2
Batting average	63.50	2.00
100s/50s	2/1	0/0
Top score	104	2
Catches/stumpings	3/–	0/–
- Source: Cricinfo, 10 January 2013

Vaibhav Prem Rawal (born 9 November 1991) is an Indian cricketer who plays for Delhi in domestic cricket. He is a left-handed batsman and leg-break bowler. He is a member of the Kolkata Knight Riders squad in the Indian Premier League. He made his List A debut for Delhi on 8 January 2013 against England XI.

He completed his schooling from Delhi Public School, Delhi and his graduation from The Hindu College, Delhi.
