= Pradeep Dadhe =

Indian cricketer (born 1994)

Personal information
- Full name: Pradeep Changdev Dadhe
- Born: 13 September 1994 (age 32); Pune, Maharashtra, India
- Source: ESPNcricinfo, 13 November 2016

Pradeep Dadhe (born 13 September 1994) is an Indian cricketer. He made his first-class debut for Maharashtra in the 2016–17 Ranji Trophy on 13 November 2016. He made his Twenty20 debut for Maharashtra in the 2016–17 Inter State Twenty-20 Tournament on 30 January 2017. He made his List A debut for Maharashtra in the 2016–17 Vijay Hazare Trophy on 25 February 2017.

In November 2017, he took his maiden five-wicket haul in first-class cricket, bowling for Maharashtra against Assam in the 2017–18 Ranji Trophy.
