= 2018–19 Deodhar Trophy =

- Dates: 23 October 2018 – 27 October 2018
- Administrator: BCCI
- Cricket format: List A cricket
- Tournament format(s): Double round robin and Knockout
- Host(s): Delhi, India
- Champions: India C (1st title)
- Participants: 3
- Matches: 4
- Most runs: Shreyas Iyer (199) (Ind-B)
- Most wickets: Vijay Shankar (7) (Ind-C)
- Official website: BCCI

The 2018–19 Deodhar Trophy was the 46th edition of the Deodhar Trophy, a List A cricket competition in India. It was contested between three teams selected by the Board of Control for Cricket in India (BCCI). It was played from 23 to 27 October 2018. India C won the tournament by defeating India B by 29 runs in the final.

== Squads ==
India A	India B	India C
Dinesh Karthik (c, wk); Prithvi Shaw; Anmolpreet Singh; Abhimanyu Easwaran; Ankit Bawne; Nitish Rana; Karun Nair; Krunal Pandya; Ravichandran Ashwin; Shreyas Gopal; Shams Mulani; Mohammed Siraj; Dhawal Kulkarni; Siddarth Kaul; Kedar Jadhav	Shreyas Iyer (c); Mayank Agarwal; Ruturaj Gaikwad; Prashant Chopra; Hanuma Vihari; Manoj Tiwary; Ankush Bains (wk); Rohit Rayudu; Krishnappa Gowtham; Mayank Markande; Shahbaz Nadeem; Deepak Chahar; Varun Aaron; Jaydev Unadkat	Ajinkya Rahane (c); Abhinav Mukund; Shubman Gill; Ravikumar Samarth; Suresh Raina; Suryakumar Yadav; Ishan Kishan (wk); Vijay Shankar; Washington Sundar; Rahul Chahar; Pappu Roy; Navdeep Saini; Rajneesh Gurbani; Umar Nazir

== Group stage ==
=== Points table ===
Team	Pld	W	L	Tie	N/R	Pts	NRR
India B	2	2	0	0	0	8	+0.730
India C	2	1	1	0	0	4	–0.116
India A	2	0	2	0	0	0	–0.632

=== Matches ===
23 October 2018
09:00
Scorecard

India B 261/8 (50 overs)	v	India A 218 (46.4 overs)
Hanuma Vihari 87* (95); Ravichandran Ashwin 2/39 (9 overs)		Dinesh Karthik 99 (114); Mayank Markande 4/48 (9.4 overs)

India B won by 43 runs.
Feroz Shah Kotla Ground, Delhi
Umpires: Anil Dandekar and Yeshwant Barde
Player of the match: Shahbaz Nadeem (India B)

- India B won the toss and elected to bat.

24 October 2018
09:00
Scorecard

India B 231/9 (50 overs)	v	India C 201 (48.2 overs)
Hanuma Vihari 76 (94); Rajneesh Gurbani 3/38 (9 overs)		Suryakumar Yadav 39 (46); Krishnappa Gowtham 3/40 (10 overs)

India B won by 30 runs.
Feroz Shah Kotla Ground, Delhi
Umpires: Anil Dandekar and K. N. Ananthapadmanabhan
Player of the match: Hanuma Vihari (India B)

- India B won the toss and elected to bat.
- As the result of this match, India B qualified for the final.

25 October 2018
09:00
Scorecard

India A 293/6 (50 overs)	v	India C 296/4 (47 overs)
Abhimanyu Easwaran 69 (103); Vijay Shankar 3/40 (10 overs)		Shubman Gill 106* (111); Ravichandran Ashwin 1/46 (10 overs)

India C won by 6 wickets.
Feroz Shah Kotla Ground, Delhi
Umpires: K. N. Ananthapadmanabhan and Yeshwant Barde
Player of the match: Shubman Gill (India C)

- India A won the toss and elected to bat.
- As the result of this match, India C qualified for the final.

== Final ==
27 October 2018
09:00
Scorecard

India C 352/7 (50 overs)	v	India B 323 (46.1 overs)
Ajinkya Rahane 144* (158); Jaydev Unadkat 3/52 (10 overs)		Shreyas Iyer 148 (114); Pappu Roy 3/75 (10 overs)

India C won by 29 runs
Feroz Shah Kotla Ground, Delhi
Umpires: Anil Dandekar and Yeshwant Barde
Player of the match: Ajinkya Rahane (India C)

- India C won the toss and elected to bat.
- Ajinkya Rahane (Ind C) scored his 10th List-A century.
