= Gaurav Kumar (cricketer) =

Indian cricketer (born 1996)

Personal information
- Born: 4 July 1996 (age 30)
- Source: ESPNcricinfo, 20 November 2018

Gaurav Kumar (born 4 July 1996) is an Indian cricketer. He made his first-class debut for Delhi in the 2018–19 Ranji Trophy on 20 November 2018. He made his Twenty20 debut for Delhi in the 2018–19 Syed Mushtaq Ali Trophy on 2 March 2019. He made his List A debut on 16 October 2019, for Delhi in the 2019–20 Vijay Hazare Trophy.
