= Pranshu Vijayran =

Indian cricketer (born 1995)

Personal information
- Full name: Pranshu Surajmal Vijayran
- Born: 18 November 1995 (age 30); Delhi, India
- Batting: Left-handed
- Bowling: Right-arm medium
- Role: All-rounder

Domestic team information
- Years: Team
- 2015–present: Delhi
- Source: Cricinfo, 12 April 2016

Pranshu Vijayran (born 18 November 1995) is an Indian cricketer. He plays Twenty20 cricket for Delhi. He made his List A debut for Delhi in the 2018–19 Vijay Hazare Trophy on 20 September 2018.

== See also ==
- List of Delhi cricketers
