= KSK Chaitanya =

Indian cricketer (born 1995)

Personal information
- Born: 6 September 1995 (age 31); Hyderabad, India
- Batting: Left-handed
- Role: Wicket-keeper

Domestic team information
- Years: Team
- 2018–present: Hyderabad

Career statistics
Competition	FC
Matches	3
Runs scored	41
Batting average	13.66
100s/50s	0/0
Top score	22
Catches/stumpings	9/–
- Source: ESPNcricinfo, 3 July 2019

KSK Chaitanya (born 6 September 1995) is an Indian cricketer who plays for Hyderabad. He made his first-class debut in the 2018–19 Ranji Trophy against the Bengal.
