= Mamata Kanojia =

Indian cricketer (born 1984)

Personal information
- Full name: Mamata Kanojia
- Born: 30 January 1984 (age 42); Secunderabad, Andhra Pradesh, India (now Telangana)
- Batting: Right-handed
- Bowling: Right-arm off-break

International information
- National side: India
- ODI debut (cap 72): 4 February 2003 v Australia
- Last ODI: 4 March 2012 v West Indies
- T20I debut (cap 30): 18 February 2012 v West Indies
- Last T20I: 22 March 2012 v Australia

Domestic team information
- Years: Team
- 1998/99–2003/04: Andhra
- 2000/01–2003/04: Air India
- 2006/07: Railways
- 2008/09–2023/24: Hyderabad
- 2014/15–2016/17: Assam
- 2021/22: Jharkhand

Career statistics
Competition	WODI	WT20I
Matches	7	4
Runs scored	61	10
Batting average	15.25	3.33
100s/50s	0/0	0/0
Top score	30	6
Balls bowled	204	–
Wickets	4	–
Bowling average	45.25	–
5 wickets in innings	0	–
10 wickets in match	0	–
Best bowling	3/48	–
Catches/stumpings	1/–	1/–
- Source: CricketArchive, 3 May 2020

Mamata Kanojia (born 3 January 1984) is an Indian former cricketer who has played for the India national women's cricket team. She has played seven One Day Internationals and four Twenty20 Internationals. She comes from Hyderabad.

Kanojia holds the record for missing the most consecutive matches for a team between appearances in Women's ODI history (99 matches on the trot over more than 8 years). According to the coach of the Hyderabad women's cricket team, she worked her way back into the national team through "hard work and determination".
