= Lakshay Thareja =

Indian cricketer

Personal information
- Full name: Lakshay Kumar Thareja
- Born: 15 September 1997 (age 29); Delhi, India
- Batting: Right-handed
- Role: Wicketkeeper
- Source: ESPNcricinfo, 8 October 2018

Lakshay Kumar Thareja is an Indian cricketer. He made his List A debut for Delhi in the 2018–19 Vijay Hazare Trophy on 8 October 2018.
