= Krishna Palai =

Indian cricketer (born 1999)

Personal information
- Full name: Krishna Palai
- Born: 10 November 1999 (age 27); Rourkela, Odisha, India
- Source: ESPNcricinfo, 28 September 2018

Krishna Palai (born 10 November 1999) is an Indian cricketer. He made his List A debut for Odisha in the 2018–19 Vijay Hazare Trophy on 28 September 2018.
