= Parandaman Thamaraikannan =

Indian cricketer (born 1992)

Personal information
- Full name: Parandaman Thamaraikannan
- Born: 2 October 1992 (age 34)
- Batting: Right handed
- Bowling: Right arm medium

Domestic team information
- Years: Team
- 2018–19: Puducherry
- Source: Cricinfo, 21 February 2019

Parandaman Thamaraikannan (born 2 October 1992) is an Indian cricketer. He made his Twenty20 debut for Puducherry in the 2018–19 Syed Mushtaq Ali Trophy on 21 February 2019. He made his first-class debut on 4 February 2020, for Puducherry in the 2019–20 Ranji Trophy. He made his List A debut on 23 February 2021, for Puducherry in the 2020–21 Vijay Hazare Trophy.
