= Varsha Choudhary =

Madhya Pradeshi cricketer

Varsha Kripalsingh Choudhary (born 6 May 1992, Indore, Madhya Pradesh) is a Madhya Pradeshi cricketer in India. She is a right-handed batsman and bowls right-arm medium pace. She played for Madhya Pradesh and Central zone. She made her debut in major domestic cricket on 28 November 2006 in a one-day match against Rajasthan. She has played 7 First-class, 63 List A and 37 Twenty20 matches.
