= Jatin Saxena =

Indian cricketer (born 1982)

Personal information
- Full name: Jatin Sahay Saxena
- Born: 4 August 1982 (age 44); Indore, Madhya Pradesh, India
- Batting: Right-handed
- Bowling: Leg break googly
- Role: All-rounder
- Relatives: Jalaj Saxena (brother)
- Source: ESPNcricinfo

Jatin Sahay Saxena (born 4 August 1982) is an Indian first-class cricketer who plays for Chhattisgarh. He previously played for Madhya Pradesh. In January 2018, he was bought by the Rajasthan Royals in the 2018 IPL auction.
