= VA Jagadeesh =

Indian cricketer (born 1983)

Personal information
- Full name: Vasudevanpillai Arundhathiamma Jagadeesh
- Born: 25 May 1983 (age 43); Kottarakara, Kerala, India
- Nickname: Jaggu
- Batting: Right-handed
- Bowling: Right-arm medium
- Role: All-rounder

Domestic team information
- Years: Team
- 2004–2019: Kerala

Career statistics
| Competition | FC | LA | T20 |
|---|---|---|---|
| Matches | 72 | 62 | 40 |
| Runs scored | 3,548 | 2,150 | 788 |
| Batting average | 33.79 | 41.34 | 25.41 |
| 100s/50s | 8/18 | 5/11 | 0/4 |
| Top score | 199* | 121 | 75 |
| Balls bowled | 1,110 | 1,332 | 492 |
| Wickets | 7 | 19 | 25 |
| Bowling average | 57.57 | 60.15 | 22.68 |
| 5 wickets in innings | 0 | 0 | 0 |
| 10 wickets in match | 0 | 0 | 0 |
| Best bowling | 1/0 | 2/9 | 3/23 |
| Catches/stumpings | 57/– | 19/– | 19/– |
- Source: CricketArchive, 3 March 2013

Vasudevanpillai Arundhathiamma Jagadeesh (born 25 May 1983) is a former Indian cricketer who represented Kerala in domestic cricket. In August 2013, he was named to the India A squad to play two unofficial tests against New Zealand A team.

He made his domestic cricket debut in 2004.
