= Pappu Roy =

Indian cricketer (born 1995)

Personal information
- Full name: Pappu Roy
- Born: 23 February 1995 (age 31)
- Source: Cricinfo, 20 September 2018

Pappu Roy (born 23 February 1995) is an Indian cricketer. He made his List A debut for Odisha in the 2018–19 Vijay Hazare Trophy on 20 September 2018. In October 2018, he was named in India C's squad for the 2018–19 Deodhar Trophy. He made his first-class debut for Odisha in the 2018–19 Ranji Trophy on 1 November 2018. He made his Twenty20 debut for Odisha in the 2018–19 Syed Mushtaq Ali Trophy on 21 February 2019.
