= Shiva Singh =

Indian cricketer (born 1999)

Personal information
- Born: 16 October 1999 (age 27); Moradabad, Uttar Pradesh, India
- Batting: Right-handed
- Bowling: Slow left arm orthodox
- Role: Bowler
- Source: Cricinfo, 21 September 2018

Shiva Singh (born 16 October 1999) is an Indian cricketer who plays for Uttar Pradesh.

== Career ==
Singh made his List A debut for Uttar Pradesh in the 2018–19 Vijay Hazare Trophy on 21 September 2018. Prior to his List A debut, he was named in India's squad for the 2018 Under-19 Cricket World Cup.

In November 2018, during an under-23 match in India, Shiva bowled a delivery where he spun through 360 degrees, just prior to releasing the ball, with the umpire calling a dead ball.

He made his Twenty20 debut for Uttar Pradesh in the 2018–19 Syed Mushtaq Ali Trophy on 21 February 2019.

In November 2022 he conceded a record 43 runs with seven sixes in an over to batsman Ruturaj Gaikwad in a Vijay Hazare Trophy quarter-final, playing against the Maharashtra cricket team for Uttar Pradesh, in Ahmedabad, after his fifth delivery was declared a no-ball.
