= Palakodeti Sairam =

Indian cricketer (born 1993)

Personal information
- Born: 24 January 1993 (age 33); Hyderabad, India
- Batting: Right-handed
- Bowling: Right-arm off break

Domestic team information
- Years: Team
- 2017-present: Hyderabad

Career statistics
Competition	FC	LA	T20
Matches	9	9	6
Runs scored	284	74	11
Batting average	35.50	24.66	11.00
100s/50s	0/0	0/0	0/0
Top score	42	23	6*
Balls bowled	1,030	348	96
Wickets	11	7	3
Bowling average	57.27	37.57	37.33
5 wickets in innings	0	0	0
10 wickets in match	0	0	0
Best bowling	3/110	3/28	2/38
Catches/stumpings	2/–	1/–	0/–
- Source: Cricinfo, 6 May 2020

Palakodeti Sairam (born 24 January 1993) is an Indian cricketer. He made his first-class debut for Hyderabad in the 2017–18 Ranji Trophy on 25 November 2017 and his List A debut for Hyderabad in the 2017–18 Vijay Hazare Trophy on 9 February 2018. His Twenty20 debut, also for Hyderabad, was in the 2018–19 Syed Mushtaq Ali Trophy on 22 February 2019.
