= Shoaib Md Khan =

Indian cricketer (born 1991)

Personal information
- Full name: Shoaib Md Khan
- Born: 1 September 1991 (age 35)
- Batting: Right-handed
- Bowling: Right-arm offbreak

Domestic team information
- Years: Team
- Andhra
- Source: ESPNcricinfo, 29 January 2017

Shoaib Md Khan (born 1 September 1991) is an Indian cricketer. He made his Twenty20 debut for Andhra in the 2016–17 Inter State Twenty-20 Tournament on 29 January 2017. He made his first-class debut for Andhra in the 2017–18 Ranji Trophy on 6 October 2017. He made his List A debut for Andhra in the 2018–19 Vijay Hazare Trophy on 19 September 2018.

He was the joint-leading wicket-taker for Andhra in the 2018–19 Ranji Trophy, with 17 dismissals in seven matches.
