= Rajat Goel =

Indian cricketer (born 1993)

Personal information
- Born: 23 January 1993 (age 33); Meerut
- Batting: Left-handed
- Bowling: Left-arm wrist spin

Domestic team information
- Years: Team
- 2018/19: Uttar Pradesh
- Source: Cricinfo, 28 September 2018

Rajat Goel (born 23 January 1993) is an Indian cricketer. He made his List A debut for Uttar Pradesh in the 2018–19 Vijay Hazare Trophy on 28 September 2018.
