= 2025 in Indian sports =

2025 in Indian sports describes the year's events in Indian sport.

== Multi-sport ==
=== National Games of India ===
The 2025 National Games of India is the 38th edition of the National Games of India, which were held in the state of Uttarakhand from 28 January to 14 February. The games comprised over 10,000 athletes from 37 teams in 35 different sports. The games were inaugurated by Prime Minister Narendra Modi, while Home Minister Amit Shah was the chief guest of the closing ceremony.

==== Medal table ====
* Host nation (Host state)

2025 National Games medal table
| Rank | State | Gold | Silver | Bronze | Total |
|---|---|---|---|---|---|
| 1 | Services | 68 | 26 | 27 | 121 |
| 2 | Maharashtra | 54 | 71 | 76 | 201 |
| 3 | Haryana | 48 | 47 | 58 | 153 |
| 4 | Madhya Pradesh | 34 | 26 | 22 | 82 |
| 5 | Karnataka | 34 | 18 | 28 | 80 |
| 6 | Tamil Nadu | 27 | 30 | 35 | 92 |
| 7 | Uttarakhand* | 24 | 35 | 44 | 103 |
| 8 | West Bengal | 16 | 13 | 18 | 47 |
| 9 | Punjab | 15 | 20 | 31 | 66 |
| 10 | Delhi | 15 | 18 | 29 | 62 |
| 11 | Manipur | 14 | 16 | 25 | 55 |
| 12 | Odisha | 14 | 15 | 17 | 46 |
| 13 | Uttar Pradesh | 13 | 20 | 23 | 56 |
| 14 | Kerala | 13 | 17 | 24 | 54 |
| 15 | Rajasthan | 9 | 11 | 23 | 43 |
| 16 | Gujarat | 8 | 10 | 20 | 38 |
| 17 | Jharkhand | 7 | 6 | 12 | 25 |
| 18 | Andhra Pradesh | 7 | 1 | 6 | 14 |
| 19 | Jammu and Kashmir | 5 | 6 | 13 | 24 |
| 20 | Andaman and Nicobar Islands | 5 | 3 | 2 | 10 |
| 21 | Chandigarh | 4 | 6 | 9 | 19 |
| 22 | Himachal Pradesh | 4 | 3 | 8 | 15 |
| 23 | Arunachal Pradesh | 4 | 3 | 6 | 13 |
| 24 | Assam | 3 | 15 | 16 | 34 |
| 25 | Chhattisgarh | 3 | 4 | 9 | 16 |
| 26 | Telangana | 3 | 3 | 12 | 18 |
| 27 | Goa | 2 | 4 | 4 | 10 |
| 28 | Mizoram | 2 | 0 | 1 | 3 |
| 29 | Bihar | 1 | 6 | 5 | 12 |
| 30 | Meghalaya | 1 | 2 | 2 | 5 |
| 31 | Puducherry | 0 | 1 | 1 | 2 |
| 32 | Nagaland | 0 | 0 | 2 | 2 |
| 32 | Sikkim | 0 | 0 | 2 | 2 |
| Totals (33 entries) | | 457 | 456 | 610 | 1,523 |

=== Asian Winter Games ===
India competed at the 2025 Asian Winter Games in Harbin, China, from February 7 to 14. The final Indian team consisted of 59 athletes. Alpine skier Arif Khan and cross-country skier Bhavani Thekkada were the country's opening ceremony flagbearers. India finished the event with no medals.

=== Special Olympics World Winter Games ===
India participated at the 2025 Special Olympics World Winter Games held in Turin, Italy from 8 to 15 March 2025. India secured 33 medals - 8 Gold, 18 Silver and 7 Bronze - making it their most successful campaign in Special Olympics World Winter Games history.

=== Khelo India Para Games ===
The 2025 Khelo India Para Games were the 2nd edition of the Khelo India Para Games, held in New Delhi from 20 to 27 March 2025. The games featured 6 sports with 189 gold medal events. Haryana topped the medal tally with 104 medals (34 Gold, 39 Silver, 31 Bronze), followed by Tamil Nadu (28 Gold, 19 Silver, 27 Bronze), and Uttar Pradesh (23 Gold, 21 Silver, 20 Bronze) respectively.

==== Medal Standings ====
* Host nation (Host state)

2025 Khelo India Para Games Medal Table
| Rank | State | Gold | Silver | Bronze | Total |
|---|---|---|---|---|---|
| 1 | Haryana | 34 | 39 | 31 | 104 |
| 2 | Tamil Nadu | 28 | 19 | 27 | 74 |
| 3 | Uttar Pradesh | 23 | 21 | 20 | 64 |
| 4 | Rajasthan | 22 | 18 | 24 | 64 |
| 5 | Maharashtra | 18 | 13 | 12 | 43 |
| 6 | Gujarat | 12 | 24 | 23 | 59 |
| 7 | Karnataka | 10 | 5 | 7 | 22 |
| 8 | Delhi* | 8 | 11 | 20 | 39 |
| 9 | Punjab | 8 | 2 | 5 | 15 |
| 10 | Andhra Pradesh | 4 | 8 | 3 | 15 |
| 11 | Telangana | 4 | 1 | 2 | 7 |
| 12 | Madhya Pradesh | 3 | 5 | 3 | 11 |
| 13 | Kerala | 3 | 4 | 5 | 12 |
| 14 | Bihar | 3 | 3 | 4 | 10 |
| 15 | Chhattisgarh | 2 | 3 | 1 | 6 |
| 16 | Odisha | 2 | 2 | 8 | 12 |
| 17 | Uttarakhand | 1 | 4 | 8 | 13 |
| 18 | Jammu and Kashmir | 1 | 1 | 2 | 4 |
| 18 | Jharkhand | 1 | 1 | 2 | 4 |
| 20 | Goa | 1 | 0 | 1 | 2 |
| 21 | Arunachal Pradesh | 1 | 0 | 0 | 1 |
| 22 | Himachal Pradesh | 0 | 3 | 2 | 5 |
| 23 | Chandigarh | 0 | 1 | 2 | 3 |
| 24 | Andaman and Nicobar Islands | 0 | 1 | 1 | 2 |
| 25 | West Bengal | 0 | 0 | 3 | 3 |
| 26 | Assam | 0 | 0 | 1 | 1 |
| 26 | Nagaland | 0 | 0 | 1 | 1 |
| Totals (27 entries) | | 189 | 189 | 218 | 596 |

=== Khelo India Youth Games ===
The 2025 edition of the Khelo India Youth Games (KIYG) was held from May 4 to May 15, 2025, marking the first time the event took place in Bihar. This national multi-sport event brought together over 10,000 athletes from 36 states and union territories, competing across 28 disciplines, including traditional Indian sports and esports as a demonstration category. Sepak takraw has been included for the first time on the back of India's gold medal in the 2025 ISTAF World Cup. Prime Minister Narendra Modi virtually inaugurated the games on May 4, 2025, with the opening ceremony held at the Patliputra Sports Complex in Patna. The event aimed to promote sports culture and infrastructure development in Bihar.

Maharashtra secured its third consecutive KIYG title with a record 158 medals, including 58 golds, showcasing dominance across multiple disciplines. Haryana excelled in sports like fencing and athletics, finishing second with 107 medals. Rajasthan achieved its best-ever finish, clinching third place with 22 golds. Bihar, the host state, delivered a historic performance, securing 7 golds among 36 total medals, marking a significant improvement from its previous standings having a Jump from 28th rank to 15th rank marking its best ever performance in the all editions of KIYG, they doubled their all edition medal tally having total of 29 medals in previous 6 editions by securing 36 medals in the single seventh edition including victories in athletics, Thang-Ta, and rugby.

==== Medal tally ====
| Rank | State/UT | Gold | Silver | Bronze | Total |
|---|---|---|---|---|---|
| 1 | Maharashtra | 58 | 47 | 53 | 158 |
| 2 | Haryana | 39 | 27 | 51 | 117 |
| 3 | Rajasthan | 24 | 12 | 24 | 60 |
| 4 | Karnataka | 17 | 26 | 15 | 58 |
| 5 | Delhi | 16 | 20 | 32 | 68 |
| 6 | Tamil Nadu | 15 | 21 | 29 | 65 |
| 7 | Uttar Pradesh | 14 | 20 | 18 | 52 |
| 8 | Kerala | 12 | 5 | 8 | 25 |
| 9 | Manipur | 11 | 8 | 11 | 30 |
| 10 | Madhya Pradesh | 10 | 9 | 13 | 32 |
| 11 | Assam | 10 | 5 | 10 | 25 |
| 12 | Telangana | 9 | 3 | 11 | 23 |
| 13 | Punjab | 8 | 14 | 25 | 44 |
| 14 | Jharkhand | 8 | 7 | 6 | 21 |
| 15 | Bihar (Host) | 7 | 11 | 18 | 36 |
| 16 | Chandigarh | 6 | 7 | 4 | 17 |
| 17 | Odisha | 5 | 6 | 3 | 14 |
| 18 | Andhra Pradesh | 3 | 11 | 10 | 24 |
| 19 | Chhattisgarh | 3 | 1 | 10 | 14 |
| 20 | Uttarakhand | 3 | 1 | 7 | 11 |
| 21 | Gujarat | 2 | 4 | 7 | 13 |
| 22 | West Bengal | 1 | 11 | 4 | 16 |
| 23 | Jammu & Kashmir | 1 | 2 | 2 | 5 |
| 24 | Nagaland | 1 | 1 | 4 | 6 |
| 25 | Arunachal Pradesh | 1 | 0 | 2 | 3 |
| 26 | Mizoram | 1 | 0 | 1 | 2 |
| 27 | Himachal Pradesh | 0 | 3 | 2 | 5 |
| 28 | Puducherry | 0 | 1 | 1 | 2 |
| 29 | Meghalaya | 0 | 0 | 2 | 2 |
| 29 | Tripura | 0 | 0 | 2 | 2 |
| 30 | Andaman & Nicobar Islands | 0 | 0 | 1 | 1 |
| 30 | Goa | 0 | 0 | 1 | 1 |
| 30 | Sikkim | 0 | 0 | 1 | 1 |

=== 2025 Summer World University Games ===
India competed at the 2025 Summer World Universiade, which was held from 16 July to 27 July 2025 in Rhine-Ruhr region, Germany. India sent its largest-ever delegation, comprising over 300 student-athletes from various colleges nationwide. India ended its campaign with 12 medals (2 gold, 5 Silver, 5 Bronze) and finished at 20th position in the medal tally.

| Medal | Name | Sport | Event | Date | Ref. |
|---|---|---|---|---|---|
| Gold | Kushal Dalal; Parneet Kaur | Archery | Mixed Compound Team | 25 July | |
| Gold | Sahil Rajesh Jadhav | Archery | Men's Compound Individual | 26 July | |
| Silver | Hritik Sharma; Kushal Dalal; Sahil Rajesh Jadhav | Archery | Men's Compound Team | 25 July | |
| Silver | Parneet Kaur | Archery | Women's Individual | 26 July | |
| Silver | Praveen Chithravel | Athletics | Men's Triple Jump | 26 July | |
| Silver | Seema | Athletics | Women's 5000 metres | 26 July | |
| Silver | Ankita Dhyani | Athletics | Women's 3000 metres steeplechase | 27 July | |
| Bronze | India national badminton team: Sathish Karunakaran; Saneeth Dayanand; Vaishnavi Khadkekar; Tasnim Mir; Devika Sihag; Varshini Viswanath Sri | Badminton | Mixed Team | 20 July | |
| Bronze | Vaishnavi Adkar | Tennis | Women's Individual | 24 July | |
| Bronze | Avneet Kaur; Madhura Dhamangaokar; Parneet Kaur | Archery | Women's Compound Team | 25 July | |
| Bronze | Sejal Anil Singh; Munita Prajapati; Mansi Negi; Shalini; Mahima Choudhary | Athletics | Women's 20 km Walk Team | 27 July | |
| Bronze | Mrutyam Dondapati; Gurindervir Singh; Lalu Prasad Bhoi; Animesh Kujur; Manikanta Hoblidhar | Athletics | Men's 4 × 100 m relay | 27 July | |

=== World Games ===
India will compete at the 2025 World Games held in Chengdu, China from 7 to 17 August 2025. They sent a contingent comprising 17 athletes across five sports. India won 3 medals (1 Silver and 2 bronze) and finished at 65th position in the medal table. This was India's second-best performance at the World Games, behind the 2013 edition.

| Medal | Name | Sport | Event | Date | Ref. |
|---|---|---|---|---|---|
| 2nd place, silver medalist(s) | Namrata Batra | Wushu | Women's 52 kg Sanda | 12 August | |
| 3rd place, bronze medalist(s) | Rishabh Yadav | Archery | Men's Compound Individual | 9 August | |
| 3rd place, bronze medalist(s) | Anandkumar Velkumar | Track speed skating | Men's 1,000 m sprint | 15 August | |

== Archery ==
=== 2025 World Archery Championships ===
India is participating in the 2025 edition of the World Archery Championships, being held from 5 to 12 September 2025 in Gwangju, South Korea. The Indian delegation will consist of a total of 12 players across 2 disciplines. India won their first-ever gold medal in the men's compound team event and a silver in the mixed team event. With one gold and a silver, India finished fourth in the medal tally.

==== Medallists ====
| Medal | Player | Discipline | Event | Date | Ref. |
|---|---|---|---|---|---|
| 1st place, gold medalist(s) | Rishabh Yadav; Aman Saini; Prathamesh Fuge | Compound | Men's team | 7 September | |
| 1st place, gold medalist(s) | GMM - Won vs France by 235–233; SF - Won vs Turkey by 234–232; QF - Won vs United States by 234–233; R16 - Won vs Australia by 230^{30}-230 | | | | |
| 2nd place, silver medalist(s) | Jyothi Surekha Vennam; Rishabh Yadav | Compound | Mixed Team | 7 September | |
| 2nd place, silver medalist(s) | GMM - Lost to (Netherlands) de Laat / (Netherlands) Schloesser by 155–157; SF - Won vs (Chinese Taipei) Huang / (Chinese Taipei) Chang by 157–155; QF - Won vs (El Salvador) Paiz / (El Salvador) Hernández by 157–153; R16 - Won vs (Germany) Raab / (Germany) Kunsch by 160–152 | | | | |

=== 2025 World Archery Youth Championships ===
India participated in the 2025 World Archery Youth Championships, held in Winnipeg, Canada from 20 August (earlier scheduled to begin from 17 August) to 24 August 2025. India finished their campaign winning eight medals - four gold, two silver and two bronze and are placed third in the medal tally.

| Medal | Player | Sport | Category | Event | Date | Ref. |
|---|---|---|---|---|---|---|
| 1st place, gold medalist(s) | Mohit Dagar; Devansh Singh; Yogesh Joshi | Compound | Under-18 | Men's Team | 22 August | |
| 1st place, gold medalist(s) | Kushal Dalal; Apar Nitin; Ganesh Thirumuru | Compound | Under-21 | Men's Team | 22 August | |
| 1st place, gold medalist(s) | Chikitha Taniparthi | Compound | Under-21 | Women's individual | 23 August | |
| 1st place, gold medalist(s) | Sharvari Shende | Recurve | Under-18 | Women's individual | 24 August | |
| 2nd place, silver medalist(s) | Prithika Pradeep; Mohit Dagar | Compound | Under-18 | Mixed Team | 23 August | |
| 2nd place, silver medalist(s) | Prithika Pradeep | Compound | Under-18 | Women's individual | 23 August | |
| 3rd place, bronze medalist(s) | Gatha Khadake; Jiana Kumar; Sharvari Shende | Recurve | Under-18 | Women's Team | 21 August | |
| 3rd place, bronze medalist(s) | Gatha Khadake; Agastay Singh | Recurve | Under-18 | Mixed Team | 24 August | |

=== 2025 Archery World Cup ===
India is participating in the 2025 Archery World Cup from 8 April to 19 October 2025. This will be India's 19th appearance at the tournament. India sent a team of 25 archers to compete in 9 events across 4 stages.

==== Medallists ====
| Medal | Player | Sport | Event | Date | Ref. |
|---|---|---|---|---|---|
| 1st place, gold medalist(s) | Jyothi Surekha Vennam; Rishabh Yadav | Compound | Mixed Team | 12 April | |
| 1st place, gold medalist(s) | Abhishek Verma; Rishabh Yadav; Ojas Pravin Deotale | Compound | Men's Team | 10 May | |
| 1st place, gold medalist(s) | Madhura Dhamangaonkar | Compound | Women's Individual | 10 May | |
| 2nd place, silver medalist(s) | Dhiraj Bommadevara; Tarundeep Rai; Atanu Das | Recurve | Men's Team | 13 April | |
| 2nd place, silver medalist(s) | Madhura Dhamangaonkar; Jyothi Surekha Vennam; Chikitha Taniparthi | Compound | Women's Team | 10 May | |
| 2nd place, silver medalist(s) | Jyothi Surekha Vennam; Parneet Kaur; Prithika Pradeep | Compound | Women's Team | 12 July | |
| 2nd place, silver medalist(s) | Jyothi Surekha Vennam | Compound | Women's Individual | 12 July | |
| 3rd place, bronze medalist(s) | Rishabh Yadav; Abhishek Verma; Ojas Pravin Deotale | Compound | Men's Team | 10 April | |
| 3rd place, bronze medalist(s) | Dhiraj Bommadevara | Recurve | Men's Individual | 13 April | |
| 3rd place, bronze medalist(s) | Madhura Dhamangaonkar; Abhishek Verma | Compound | Mixed Team | 10 May | |
| 3rd place, bronze medalist(s) | Rishabh Yadav | Compound | Men's Individual | 10 May | |
| 3rd place, bronze medalist(s) | Deepika Kumari | Recurve | Women's Individual | 11 May | |
| 3rd place, bronze medalist(s) | Parth Salunkhe | Recurve | Men's Individual | 11 May | |
| 3rd place, bronze medalist(s) | Jyothi Surekha Vennam; Rishabh Yadav | Compound | Mixed Team | 12 July | |

==== World Cup Rankings ====
The top 8 archers with the highest scores across all stages in each event will qualify for the final stage. A player winning a gold medal in any stage will automatically qualify for the final.

Men's Recurve
| Archers | Step I | | Step II | | Step III | | Step IV | | Total | Rank |
| Archers | Rank | Pts. | Rank | Pts. | Rank | Pts. | Rank | Pts. | Total | Rank |
|---|---|---|---|---|---|---|---|---|---|---|
| Dhiraj Bommadevara | 3rd place, bronze medalist(s) | 22 | 33 | 0 | 17 | 1 | 33 | 0 | 23 | 14 |
| Parth Salunkhe | 33 | 0 | 3rd place, bronze medalist(s) | 18 | 33 | 0 | —N/a | —N/a | 18 | 16 |
| Atanu Das | 9 | 5 | 7 | 11 | 17 | 1 | —N/a | —N/a | 17 | 17 |
| Tarundeep Rai | 17 | 1 | 33 | 0 | 33 | 0 | 33 | 0 | 1 | 48 |
| Neeraj Chauhan | —N/a | —N/a | —N/a | —N/a | —N/a | —N/a | 17 | 1 | 1 | 48 |
| Rahul Singh | —N/a | —N/a | —N/a | —N/a | —N/a | —N/a | 33 | 0 | 0 | 79 |

Women's Recurve
| Archers | Step I | | Step II | | Step III | | Step IV | | Total | Rank |
| Archers | Rank | Pts. | Rank | Pts. | Rank | Pts. | Rank | Pts. | Total | Rank |
|---|---|---|---|---|---|---|---|---|---|---|
| Deepika Kumari | 5 | 13 | 3rd place, bronze medalist(s) | 18 | 17 | 1 | 33 | 0 | 32 | 11 |
| Simranjeet Kaur | 33 | 0 | 33 | 0 | 5 | 13 | —N/a | —N/a | 13 | 20 |
| Ankita Bhakat | 17 | 1 | 9 | 5 | 33 | 0 | 17 | 1 | 7 | 26 |
| Gatha Anandrao Khadake | —N/a | —N/a | —N/a | —N/a | —N/a | —N/a | 9 | 5 | 5 | 34 |
| Sharvari Somnath Shende | —N/a | —N/a | —N/a | —N/a | —N/a | —N/a | 17 | 1 | 1 | 50 |
| Anshika Kumari | 17 | 1 | 33 | 0 | — | 0 | —N/a | —N/a | 1 | 50 |

Men's Compound
| Archers | Step I | | Step II | | Step III | | Step IV | | Total | Rank |
| Archers | Rank | Pts. | Rank | Pts. | Rank | Pts. | Rank | Pts. | Total | Rank |
|---|---|---|---|---|---|---|---|---|---|---|
| Rishabh Yadav | 17 | 1 | 3rd place, bronze medalist(s) | 23 | 8 | 11 | 17 | 9 | 43 | 5Q |
| Abhishek Verma | 4 | 15 | 17 | 9 | 9 | 5 | —N/a | —N/a | 29 | 11 |
| Ojas Pravin Deotale | 9 | 5 | 33 | 0 | 33 | 0 | —N/a | —N/a | 5 | 36 |
| Uday Kamboj | —N/a | —N/a | 17 | 1 | 17 | 1 | —N/a | —N/a | 2 | 43 |
| Aman Saini | —N/a | —N/a | —N/a | —N/a | —N/a | —N/a | 17 | 1 | 1 | 47 |
| Priyansh | —N/a | —N/a | —N/a | —N/a | —N/a | —N/a | 17 | 1 | 1 | 47 |
| Prathamesh Fuge | —N/a | —N/a | —N/a | —N/a | —N/a | —N/a | 33 | 0 | 0 | 67 |

Women's Compound
| Archers | Step I | | Step II | | Step III | | Step IV | | Total | Rank |
| Archers | Rank | Pts. | Rank | Pts. | Rank | Pts. | Rank | Pts. | Total | Rank |
|---|---|---|---|---|---|---|---|---|---|---|
| Jyothi Surekha Vennam | 9 | 9 | 5 | 17 | 17 | 1 | 2nd place, silver medalist(s) | 29 | 55 | 3Q |
| Madhura Dhamangaonkar | —N/a | —N/a | 1st place, gold medalist(s) | 31 | 5 | 18 | —N/a | —N/a | 49 | 4Q |
| Parneet Kaur | —N/a | —N/a | —N/a | —N/a | —N/a | —N/a | 4 | 17 | 17 | 15 |
| Aditi Gopichand Swami | —N/a | —N/a | 17 | 1 | 7 | 11 | —N/a | —N/a | 12 | 20 |
| Chikitha Taniparthi | —N/a | —N/a | 17 | 1 | 17 | 1 | 9 | 5 | 7 | 28 |
| Prithika Pradeep | —N/a | —N/a | —N/a | —N/a | —N/a | —N/a | 33 | 0 | 0 | 78 |

==== Final ====
Three Indian compound archers qualified for the final, with Dhamangaonkar securing a direct qualification after winning Stage 2, while Vennam and Yadav qualified after finishing in the top 8 of their respective events.

| Athlete | Event | Quarterfinals | Semifinals | Final / BM | |
| Athlete | Event | Opposition Score | Opposition Score | Opposition Score | Rank |
|---|---|---|---|---|---|
| Rishabh Yadav | Men's; Individual | (France) Girard | | | |
| Jyothi Surekha Vennam | Women's; Individual | (Mexico) Bernal | | | |
| Madhura Dhamangaonkar | Women's; Individual | (South Korea) Han | | | |

== Aquatics ==
=== World Aquatics Championships ===
India competed at the 2025 World Aquatics Championships in Singapore from July 11 to August 3, 2025. A total of 19 swimmers participated across 3 disciplines. India ended their campaign with no medals.

== Athletics ==
=== 2025 World Athletics Championships ===
India is competing at the 2025 World Athletics Championships in Tokyo, Japan, from 13 to 21 September 2025. India entered 19 athletes to the championships: 5 women and 14 men across 15 events.

=== 2025 World Para Athletics Championships ===
India will host the upcoming edition of the World Para Athletics Championships at Jawaharlal Nehru Stadium, Delhi, from 27 September to 5 October 2025.

== Badminton ==
=== 2025 BWF World Championships ===
India participated in the 2025 edition of the BWF World Championships, held in Paris, France between 25 and 31 August 2025. A total of 15 athletes participated across 5 events. Malvika Bansod withdrew from the competition due to injury. Lakshya Sen was eliminated in the first round by the top-seed, China's Shi Yu Qi in straight sets. Prannoy H. S. also exited early after losing a close match to second seed Antonsen in the second round and concluded the men's individual campaign for the contingent. Hariharan Amsakarunan and Ruban Rethinasabapathi were defeated by the Taipei pair of Liu and Yang in the first round. Rohan Kapoor and Ruthvika Gadde won the first round but were defeated by the Malaysian pair of Chen and Toh in the second round. P. V. Sindhu started her campaign on a brilliant note and caused a stellar performance against the World No. 2, China's Wang to book her spot at the quarter-finals, where she ultimately lost to the Indonesian player, Wardani in a hard-fought game. Dhruv Kapila and Tanisha Crasto also had a similar journey, where they caused an updet by defeating the fifth seed pair, Hong Kong's Tang and Tse but eventually lost to the Malaysian pair of Chen TJ and Toh in the quarter-finals. Chirag Shetty and Satwiksairaj Rankireddy's path to a medal was not easy as they fought hard against world no.6, the Chinese Pair of Liang and Wang C and went on to comfortably beaten their toughest rivals World no. 2, Malaysia's Chia and Soh (who defeated the same Indian pair in the quarterfinals of 2024 Olympics at this same venue) in straight sets to ensure their second medal in World Championship history, after the bronze in Tokyo 2022. They lost to the Chinese pair of Chen and Liu after putting a clinical fight and ended their campaign with a bronze medal.

| Athlete | Event | Round of 64 | Round of 32 | Round of 16 | Quarterfinals | Semifinals | Final / BM | |
| Athlete | Event | Opposition Score | Opposition Score | Opposition Score | Opposition Score | Opposition Score | Opposition Score | Rank |
|---|---|---|---|---|---|---|---|---|
| Lakshya Sen | Men's; Singles | (China) Shi (1); L 0-2 (17–21, 19–21) | Did not advance to next round; Rank: 33 | | | | | |
| Prannoy H. S. | Men's; Singles | (Finland) Oldorff; W 2-0 (21–18, 21–15) | (Denmark) Antonsen (2); L 1-2 (7-21, 21–17, 21–23) | Did not advance to next round; Rank: 17 | | | | |
| P. V. Sindhu (15) | Women's; Singles | (Bulgaria) Nalbantova; W 2-0 (23–21, 21–6) | (Malaysia) Letshanaa; W 2-0 (21–19, 21–15) | (China) Wang Z (2); W 2-0 (21–19, 21–15) | (Indonesia) Wardani (9); L 1-2 (14–21, 21–13, 16–21) | Did not advance to next round; Rank: 8 | | |
| Satwiksairaj Rankireddy; Chirag Shetty (9) | Men's; Doubles | —N/a | (Chinese Taipei) Liu K / Yang; W 2-0 (22–20,21-13) | (China) Liang / Wang C (6); W 2-1 (19–21, 21–15, 21–17) | (Malaysia) Chia / Soh (2); W 2-0 (21–12,21-19) | (China) Chen / Liu (11); L 1-2 (19–21, 21–18, 12–21) | Did not advance | 3rd place, bronze medalist(s) |
| Hariharan Amsakarunan; Ruban Rethinasabapathi | Men's; Doubles | (Chinese Taipei) Liu K-h / Yang; L 0-2 (15–21, 5-21) | Did not advance to next round; Rank:33 | | | | | |
| Priya Konjengbam; Shruti Mishra | Women's; Doubles | (France) Lambert / Pognante; L 0-2 (17–21, 16–21) | Did not advance to next round; Rank:33 | | | | | |
| Rutaparna Panda; Swetaparna Panda | Women's; Doubles | (Bulgaria) G Stoeva / S Stoeva; L 0-2 (12–21, 11–21) | Did not advance to next round; Rank:33 | | | | | |
| Dhruv Kapila; Tanisha Crasto (16) | Mixed; Doubles | —N/a | (Republic of Ireland) Magee / Ryan; W 2-0 (21–11, 21–16) | (Hong Kong) Tang / Tse (5); W 2-1 (19–21, 21–12, 21–15) | (Malaysia) Chen TJ / Toh (4); L 0-2 (15–21, 13–21) | Did not advance to next round; Rank:8 | | |
| Rohan Kapoor; Ruthvika Gadde | Mixed; Doubles | (Macau) Leong / Chi; W 2-1 (18–21, 21–16, 21–18) | (Malaysia) Chen TJ / Toh (4); L 0-2 (16–21, 11–21) | Did not advance to next round; Rank: 17 | | | | |

=== 2025 BWF World Senior Championships ===
India is participating in the 2025 edition of the BWF World Senior Championships, held in Pattaya, Thailand between 7 to 14 September 2025. A total of 193 athletes represented the nation in the tournament across various age groups.

| Medal | Player | Event | Group | Date |
|---|---|---|---|---|
| 2nd place, silver medalist(s) | Jessie Philip | Women's Singles | 70+ | 14 September |
| 2nd place, silver medalist(s) | Final - Lost to (Scotland) Black (17–21, 7-21); SF - Won vs (Canada) Kuo (21–16, 19–21, 21–13); QF - Won vs (India) John (21–17, 21–18) | | | |
| 2nd place, silver medalist(s) | B.V.S.K Lingeswara Rao; Suzanne Venglet | Mixed Doubles | 55+ | 14 September |
| 2nd place, silver medalist(s) | Final - Lost to (Denmark) Sorensen / (Denmark) Andersen (21–18, 12–21, 12–21); SF - Won vs (Chinese Taipei) Li / (Chinese Taipei) Kuo (22–20, 21–17); QF - Won vs (Indonesia) Soedarno / (Indonesia) Tjendrawati (20–22, 21–12, 21–12); R16 - Won vs (Finland) Erikkson / (Finland) Roivainen (21–11, 21–10); R32 - Won vs (Thailand) Aroonprasertkul / (Thailand) Aunarrom (21–9, 21–13) | | | |
| 3rd place, bronze medalist(s) | Abhinand Shetty; Sangeetha Mari | Mixed Doubles | 40+ | 13 September |
| 3rd place, bronze medalist(s) | SF - Lost to (Indonesia) Rahmat / (Sri Lanka) Nadeesha (22–20, 10–21, 13–21); QF - Won vs (Hong Kong) Chan / (Hong Kong) Wong (21–10, 21–17); R16 - Won vs (Switzerland) Bless / (Switzerland) Monney (22–20, 14–21, 21–18); R32 - Won vs (Japan) Sakai / (Japan) Kawashima (21–16, 21–14); R64 - Won vs (United Arab Emirates) Seth / (United Arab Emirates) Kuttikrishnan (21–12, 19–21, 21–18) | | | |
| 3rd place, bronze medalist(s) | Philip Bency | Men's Singles | 70+ | 13 September |
| 3rd place, bronze medalist(s) | SF - Lost to (Malaysia) Garip (20–22, 11–21); QF - Won vs (Sweden) Liljestrom (21–16, 21–11); R16 - Won vs (Canada) Paynter (21–6, 21–10); R32 - Won vs (Germany) Faig (25–23, 2-0 RET); R64 - Won vs (France) Sethuraman (21–17, 21–16) | | | |
| 3rd place, bronze medalist(s) | Poonam Tatwawadi | Women's Singles | 55+ | 13 September |
| 3rd place, bronze medalist(s) | SF - Lost to (Germany) Eberl (17–21, 13–21); QF - Won vs (Austria) Aberer (21–13, 21–16); R16 - Won vs (Canada) Pittman (21–16, 21–15); R32 - Won vs (Germany) Cole (21–10, 21–10) | | | |
| 3rd place, bronze medalist(s) | Leena Dhapre | Women's Singles | 50+ | 13 September |
| 3rd place, bronze medalist(s) | SF - Lost to (Sri Lanka) Hettiarachchige (17–21, 16–21); QF - Won vs (Japan) Kimura (21–14, 18–21, 21–13); R16 - Won vs (Chinese Taipei) Lin (21–12, 21–15); R32 - Won vs (Denmark) Asmussen (21–14, 21–16) | | | |
| 3rd place, bronze medalist(s) | Abhinn Shyam Gupta | Men's Singles | 45+ | 13 September |
| 3rd place, bronze medalist(s) | SF - Lost to (Denmark) Lund (16–21, 19–21); QF - Won vs (Switzerland) Colin (16–21, 21–13, 21–18); R16 - Won vs (Thailand) Chuaymak (21–17, 8-21, 23–21); R32 - Won vs (France) Fuchs (21–14, 21–12); R64 - Won vs (Norway) Karlsen (21–9, 7-1 RET) | | | |

=== 2025 BWF World Tour ===
India is participating in the 2025 BWF World Tour from 7 January to 21 December.

==== Winners ====
- 2025 U.S. Open - Ayush Shetty (Super 300)
- 2025 Australian Open -Lakshya Sen (Super 500)

==== Runners-up ====
- 2025 Malaysia Masters - Srikanth Kidambi (Super 500)
- 2025 U.S. Open - Tanvi Sharma (Super 300)
- 2025 Hong Kong Open - Satwiksairaj Rankireddy / Chirag Shetty (Super 500)
- 2025 Hong Kong Open - Lakshya Sen (Super 500)

==== Semi-finalists ====
- 2025 Malaysia Open - Satwiksairaj Rankireddy / Chirag Shetty (Super 1000)
- 2025 India Open - Satwiksairaj Rankireddy / Chirag Shetty (Super 750)
- 2025 German Open - Dhruv Kapila / Tanisha Crasto (Super 300)
- 2025 Orléans Masters - Ayush Shetty (Super 300)
- 2025 Swiss Open - Treesa Jolly / Gayatri Gopichand (Super 300)
- 2025 Taipei Open - Ayush Shetty (Super 300)
- 2025 Taipei Open - Unnati Hooda (Super 300)
- 2025 Singapore Open - Satwiksairaj Rankireddy / Chirag Shetty (Super 750)
- 2025 Canada Open - Srikanth Kidambi (Super 300)
- 2025 China Open - Satwiksairaj Rankireddy / Chirag Shetty (Super 1000)
- 2025 Macau Open - Lakshya Sen (Super 300)
- 2025 Macau Open - Tharun Manepalli (Super 300)
- 2025 Vietnam Open - Ashmita Chaliha (Super 100)

=== 2025 Badminton Asia Mixed Team Championships ===
India participated in the 2025 Badminton Asia Mixed Team Championships, which was held at the Conson Gymnasium, Qingdao, China, from 11 to 16 February 2025.

==== Group Stage ====
| Pos | Team | Pld | W | L | MF | MA | MD | GF | GA | GD | PF | PA | PD | Pts | Qualification |
|---|---|---|---|---|---|---|---|---|---|---|---|---|---|---|---|
| 1 | South Korea | 2 | 2 | 0 | 8 | 2 | +6 | 18 | 5 | +13 | 457 | 329 | +128 | 2 | Knockout stage |
| 2 | India | 2 | 1 | 1 | 7 | 3 | +4 | 15 | 8 | +7 | 434 | 357 | +77 | 1 | Knockout stage |
| 3 | Macau | 2 | 0 | 2 | 0 | 10 | −10 | 0 | 20 | −20 | 215 | 420 | −205 | 0 | |

Source: BWF

India
5
Conson Gymnasium - Court 2
12 February 2025, 09:30 UTC+8
Report

Macau
0

| | | | 1 | 2 | 3 |
|---|---|---|---|---|---|
| 1 | (India) (Macau) | Sathish Karunakaran / Aadya Variyath; Leong Iok Chong / Ng Weng Chi | 21; 10 | 21; 9 |
| 2 | (India) (Macau) | Lakshya Sen; Pui Pang Fong | 21; 16 | 21; 12 |
| 3 | (India) (Macau) | Malvika Bansod; Chan Hao Wai | 21; 15 | 21; 9 |
| 4 | (India) (Macau) | Arjun M. R. / Chirag Shetty; Pui Chi Chon / Vong Kok Weng | 21; 15 | 21; 9 |
| 5 | (India) (Macau) | Treesa Jolly / Gayatri Gopichand; Ng Weng Chi / Pui Chi Wa | 21; 10 | 21; 5 |

South Korea
3
Conson Gymnasium - Court 2
13 February 2025, 09:30 UTC+8
Report

India
2

| | | | 1 | 2 | 3 |
|---|---|---|---|---|---|
| 1 | (South Korea) (India) | Ki Dong-ju / Jeong Na-eun; Dhruv Kapila / Tanisha Crasto | 11; 21 | 21; 12 | 21; 15 |
| 2 | (South Korea) (India) | Sim Yu-jin; Malvika Bansod | 21; 9 | 21; 10 |
| 3 | (South Korea) (India) | Cho Geon-yeop; Sathish Karunakaran | 21; 17 | 18; 21 | 19; 21 |
| 4 | (South Korea) (India) | Kim Min-ji / Kim Yu-jung; Treesa Jolly / Gayatri Gopichand | 21; 19 | 16; 21 | 11; 21 |
| 5 | (South Korea) (India) | Jin Yong / Na Sung-seung; Arjun M. R. / Satwiksairaj Rankireddy | 21; 14 | 25; 23 |

==== Quarter-finals ====
Japan
3
Conson Gymnasium - Court 2
14 February 2025, 09:30 UTC+8
Report

India
0

| | | | 1 | 2 | 3 |
|---|---|---|---|---|---|---|
| 1 | (Japan) (India) | Hiroki Midorikawa / Natsu Saito; Dhruv Kapila / Tanisha Crasto | 21; 13 | 17; 21 | 21; 13 |
| 2 | (Japan) (India) | Tomoka Miyazaki; Malvika Bansod | 21; 12 | 21; 19 |
| 3 | (Japan) (India) | Kenta Nishimoto; Prannoy H. S. | 21; 14 | 15; 21 | 21; 12 |
| 4 | (Japan) (India) | Arisa Igarashi / Ayako Sakuramoto; Treesa Jolly / Gayatri Gopichand | | | | not played |
| 5 | (Japan) (India) | Takumi Nomura / Yuichi Shimogami; Satwiksairaj Rankireddy / Chirag Shetty | | | | not played |

=== 2025 Badminton Asia Championships ===
India participated in the 2025 Badminton Asia Championships which took place at the Ningbo Olympic Sports Center Gymnasium, Ningbo, China, from 8 to 13 April 2025. India entered with 31 players across five events. Indian athletes displayed a poor performance at the tournament, with no one except Tanisha Crasto and Dhruv Kapila reaching the quarter-finals, where they lost and ended the campaign with no podium finish.

=== Sudirman Cup ===
India participated in the 2025 Sudirman Cup, held in Xiamen, China, between 27 April and 4 May 2025. India qualified for the tournament by world rankings and entered with a low-strength squad. India managed to win only one game in the group stage and was eliminated.

==== Group Stage ====
| Pos | Team | Pld | W | L | GF | GA | GD | PF | PA | PD | Pts | Qualification |
|---|---|---|---|---|---|---|---|---|---|---|---|---|
| 1 | Indonesia | 3 | 3 | 0 | 28 | 7 | +21 | 713 | 519 | +194 | 3 | Advance to quarter-finals |
| 2 | Denmark | 3 | 2 | 1 | 21 | 11 | +10 | 606 | 519 | +87 | 2 | Advance to quarter-finals |
| 3 | India | 3 | 1 | 2 | 13 | 22 | −9 | 582 | 673 | −91 | 1 | |
| 4 | England | 3 | 0 | 3 | 6 | 28 | −22 | 494 | 684 | −190 | 0 | |

Source: BWF
Rules for classification: Tiebreakers

27 April 2025
17:00

| Denmark | 4–1 | India |
Report

Fenghuang Gymnasium Court 1, Xiamen

29 April 2025
17:00

| Indonesia | 4–1 | India |
Report

Fenghuang Gymnasium Court 1, Xiamen

29 April 2025
17:00

| Denmark | 5–0 | England |
Report

Fenghuang Gymnasium Court 2, Xiamen

1 May 2025
17:00

| India | 3–2 | England |
Report

Fenghuang Gymnasium Court 2, Xiamen

=== Asian Junior Championships ===
India participated in the 2025 Badminton Asia Junior Championships, held in Surakarta, Indonesia between 18 and 27 July 2025. India won two medals in the tournament, both bronze and won in girls' singles event by Tanvi Sharma and Vennala Kalagotla, and finished 5th at the medals tally.

== Basketball ==
=== FIBA Asia Cup ===
India is competing in the 2025 FIBA Asia Cup, held in Saudi Arabia from 5–17 August 2025. India qualified for the tournament after topping Group H in the qualifying tournament. India were grouped with the sixteen-times winners China, the hosts Saudi Arabia and Jordan, all having higher FIBA ranking than India. In their first match against Jordan, India reached close to cause an upset but were ultimately defeated by their opponent in overtime by 84–91. India lost their remaining two matches against China and Saudi Arabia and finished 15th overall in the medal table.

==== Group Stage ====
| Pos | Team | Pld | W | L | PF | PA | PD | Pts | Qualification |
|---|---|---|---|---|---|---|---|---|---|
| 1 | China | 3 | 3 | 0 | 283 | 225 | +58 | 6 | Quarterfinals |
| 2 | Saudi Arabia (H) | 3 | 2 | 1 | 249 | 225 | +24 | 5 | Playoffs |
| 3 | Jordan | 3 | 1 | 2 | 232 | 251 | −19 | 4 | Playoffs |
| 4 | India | 3 | 0 | 3 | 212 | 275 | −63 | 3 | |

Source: FIBA
Rules for classification: 1) Points; 2) Head-to-head results; 3) Points difference; 4) Points scored.
(H) Hosts

5 August 2025
14:00

Boxscore

| Jordan | 91–84 (OT) | India |
Scoring by quarter: 18–14, 20–24, 22–17, 20–25, Overtime: 11–4
| Pts: Tucker 30; Rebs: Abbas, Ibrahim 7 Asts: Ibrahim 6 | | Pts: Muthu Krishnan 14; Rebs: Prince 7 Asts: Prince 5 |

King Abdullah Sports City, Jeddah
Attendance: 175
Referees: Scott Beker (AUS), Ahmed Al-Bulushi (OMA), Preeda Muongmee (THA)

7 August 2025
11:00

Boxscore

| India | 69–100 | China |
Scoring by quarter: 14–29, 17–24, 17–22, 21–25
| Pts: Muthu Krishnan 16; Rebs: Prince 7 Asts: Dagar 5 | | Pts: Hu M., Zhao J. 17; Rebs: Hu J. 10; Asts: Liao 8 |

King Abdullah Sports City, Jeddah
Attendance: 39
Referees: Rabah Noujaim (LBN), Glenn Cornelio (PHI), Paul Skayem (LBN)

9 August 2025
18:00

Boxscore

| India | 59–84 | Saudi Arabia |
Scoring by quarter: 25–24, 6–21, 18–21, 10–18
| Pts: Brar 20; Rebs: Prince 4 Asts: Muthu Krishnan, Sekhon 5 | | Pts: Al-Suwailem 15; Rebs: Al-Suwailem 14; Asts: Abdel Gabar 7 |

King Abdullah Sports City, Jeddah
Attendance: 2,350
Referees: Takaki Kato (JPN), Harja Jaladri (INA), Park Kyoung-jin (KOR)

== Chess ==
=== 2025 Women's Chess World Cup ===
India participated in the Women's Chess World Cup 2025, which was a 107-player single-elimination chess tournament that took place in Batumi, Georgia, from 5 July to 29 July 2025.

Divya Deshmukh, seeded 15th, defeated 2nd seed Zhu Jiner in the fourth round, 10th seed Harika Dronavalli in the quarterfinals, and 3rd seed Tan Zhongyi in the semifinals. In the final, she defeated 4th seed Koneru Humpy in tiebreaks to win the tournament. With this win, she earned the grandmaster title, which is directly awarded to the winner of the World Cup without requiring the usual three norms. She became India's 88th grandmaster and the fourth Indian woman to become a grandmaster. Additionally, she qualified for the Women's Candidates Tournament 2026.

==== Summary ====
| Athlete | Round 1 | Round 2 | Round 3 | Round 4 | Quarterfinals | Semifinals | Final / BM | |
| Athlete | Opposition Score | Opposition Score | Opposition Score | Opposition Score | Opposition Score | Opposition Score | Opposition Score | Rank |
|---|---|---|---|---|---|---|---|---|
| Kiran Manisha Mohanty | (China) Song; L 0.5-1.5 | Did not advance to next round | | | | | | |
| Padmini Rout | (China) Zhang; W 2–0 | (Switzerland) Kosteniuk; L 3.5-4.5 | Did not advance to next round | | | | | |
| Priyanka K | (Hungary) Gaal; W 5–3 | (Poland) Kulon; L 1–3 | Did not advance to next round | | | | | |
| Koneru Humpy | —N/a | (Uzbekistan) Khamdamova; W 1.5-0.5 | (Poland) Kulon; W 1.5-0.5 | (Switzerland) Kosteniuk; W 2.5-1.5 | (China) Song; W 1.5-0.5 | (China) Lei; W 5-3 | (India) Deshmukh; L 1.5-2.5 | 2nd place, silver medalist(s) |
| Vaishali Rameshbabu | —N/a | (Canada) Ouellet; W 2-0 | (United States) Yip; W 4-2 | (Kazakhstan) Kamalidenova; W 4.5-3.5 | (China) Tan; L 0.5-1.5 | Did not advance to next round | | |
| Vantika Agrawal | (Turkmenistan) Shohradova; W 1.5-0.5 | (Ukraine) Ushenina; W 4.5-3.5 | (FIDE) Lagno; L 2.5-3.5 | Did not advance to next round | | | | |
| P. V. Nandhidhaa | (Ecuador) Ortiz Verdezoto; W 2-0 | (India) Dronavalli; L 0.5-1.5 | Did not advance to next round | | | | | |
| Harika Dronavalli | —N/a | (India) Nandhidhaa; W 1.5-0.5 | (Greece) Tsolakidou; W 4-2 | (FIDE) Lagno; W 3.5-2.5 | (India) Deshmukh; L 1-3 | Did not advance to next round | | |
| Divya Deshmukh | —N/a | (Georgia (country)) Mgeladze; W 1.5-0.5 | (Serbia) Injac; W 1.5-0.5 | (China) Zhu; W 2.5-1.5 | (India) Dronavalli; W 3-1 | (China) Tan; W 1.5-0.5 | (India) Koneru; W 2.5-1.5 | 1st place, gold medalist(s) |

==== Finals ====
| Seed | Name | Rating | 1 | 2 | TB1 | TB2 | Total |
|---|---|---|---|---|---|---|---|
| 4 | (India) Koneru Humpy | 2536 | ½ | ½ | ½ | 0 | 1½ |
| 15 | (India) Divya Deshmukh | 2463 | ½ | ½ | ½ | 1 | 2½ |

=== 2025 Tata Steel Chess Tournament ===
The Tata Steel Chess Tournament 2025 was held from 17 January to 2 February 2025 in Wijk aan Zee, Netherlands. In the Masters section, Rameshbabu Praggnanandhaa defeated World Champion Gukesh Dommaraju in tiebreaks to win the tournament

==== Masters ====
Category XX (2726)
| Rank | Player | Rating | 1 | 2 | 3 | 4 | 5 | 6 | 7 | 8 | 9 | 10 | 11 | 12 | 13 | 14 | Total | TB | SB | TPR |
|---|---|---|---|---|---|---|---|---|---|---|---|---|---|---|---|---|---|---|---|---|
| 1 | R Praggnanandhaa (India) | 2741 | | ½ | ½ | 1 | 0 | ½ | 1 | 0 | 1 | 1 | ½ | 1 | 1 | ½ | 8½ | 2 | 52.75 | 2834 |
| 2 | Gukesh Dommaraju (India) | 2777 | ½ | | ½ | ½ | 1 | ½ | 1 | 1 | ½ | 0 | ½ | ½ | 1 | 1 | 8½ | 1 | 53.00 | 2832 |
| 7 | Pentala Harikrishna (India) | 2695 | 0 | 0 | ½ | 0 | ½ | ½ | | ½ | ½ | 1 | ½ | 1 | ½ | 1 | 6½ | | 37.75 | 2728 |
| 10 | Arjun Erigaisi (India) | 2801 | 0 | 1 | 1 | 0 | ½ | ½ | 0 | ½ | ½ | | ½ | ½ | ½ | 0 | 5½ | | 37.50 | 2663 |
| 13 | Leon Luke Mendonca (India) | 2639 | 0 | 0 | 0 | 1 | ½ | ½ | ½ | 0 | ½ | ½ | ½ | ½ | | ½ | 5 | | 31.25 | 2645 |

Tie-breaker
| Name | 1 | 2 | SD | Total |
|---|---|---|---|---|
| (India) R Praggnanandhaa | 0 | 1 | 1 | 2 |
| (India) Gukesh Dommaraju | 1 | 0 | 0 | 1 |

=== Challengers ===
Category XII (2546.5)
| | Player | Rating | 1 | 2 | 3 | 4 | 5 | 6 | 7 | 8 | 9 | 10 | 11 | 12 | 13 | 14 | Total | SB | TPR |
|---|---|---|---|---|---|---|---|---|---|---|---|---|---|---|---|---|---|---|---|
| 9 | GM Vaishali Rameshbabu (India) | 2476 | 0 | 0 | 1 | 1 | ½ | 0 | ½ | 0 | | ½ | ½ | ½ | 1 | ½ | 6 | 35.50 | 2523 |
| 12 | IM Divya Deshmukh (India) | 2490 | ½ | 0 | 0 | 0 | 0 | 1 | 0 | 0 | ½ | 0 | ½ | | 0 | 1 | 3½ | 19.00 | 2376 |

== Cricket ==
=== Women's Cricket World Cup ===
India will host the 2025 Women's Cricket World Cup across five venues (with Sri Lanka hosting some of their matches and matches involving Pakistan). The tournament will be played in a round-robin format from 30 September to 2 November 2025. India reached the knockout stages with 3 wins, 3 losses and 1 no-result, finishing 4th in the points table. In the semi-finals, India chased down the highest successful score in Women's ODIs and qualified for their third final since 2005 and 2017. In the final, India defeated South Africa by 52 runs to win their maiden World Cup title.

==== Squad ====
On 19 August 2025, India became the first to announce their squad for the tournament. Tejal Hasabnis, Prema Rawat, Priya Mishra, Uma Chetry, Sayali Satghare and Minnu Mani were named as reserves.

Indian women's squad
| No. | Player | Birth date | Batting style | Bowling style |
Batters
| 18 | Smriti Mandhana (vc) | July 18, 1996 (age 30) | Left handed | Right-arm medium-fast |
| 33 | Harleen Deol | June 21, 1998 (age 28) | Right handed | Right-arm leg break |
| 64 | Pratika Rawal | September 1, 2000 (age 26) | Right handed | Right-arm off break |
| 5 | Jemimah Rodrigues | September 5, 2000 (age 26) | Right handed | Right-arm off break |
Wicket-keepers
| 19 | Yastika Bhatia | November 1, 2000 (age 26) | Left handed | —N/a |
| 13 | Richa Ghosh | September 28, 2003 (age 23) | Right handed | —N/a |
All-rounders
| 23 | Harmanpreet Kaur (c) | March 8, 1989 (age 37) | Right handed | Right-arm off break |
| 30 | Amanjot Kaur | August 25, 2000 (age 26) | Right handed | Right-arm medium |
| 6 | Deepti Sharma | August 24, 1997 (age 29) | Left handed | Right-arm off break |
Spin bowlers
| 40 | Shree Charani | August 4, 2004 (age 22) | Left handed | Slow left-arm orthodox |
| 2 | Sneh Rana | February 18, 1994 (age 32) | Right handed | Right-arm off break |
| 21 | Radha Yadav | April 21, 2000 (age 26) | Right handed | Slow left-arm orthodox |
Pace bowlers
| 26 | Kranti Goud | August 11, 2003 (age 23) | Right handed | Right-arm medium-fast |
| 20 | Arundhati Reddy | October 4, 1997 (age 29) | Right handed | Right-arm medium-fast |
| 10 | Renuka Singh Thakur | January 2, 1996 (age 30) | Right handed | Right-arm medium-fast |

==== League Stage ====
| Pos | Team | Pld | W | L | NR | Pts | NRR | Qualification |
|---|---|---|---|---|---|---|---|---|
| 1 | Australia | 7 | 6 | 0 | 1 | 13 | 2.102 | Advanced to the knockout stage |
| 2 | England | 7 | 5 | 1 | 1 | 11 | 1.233 | Advanced to the knockout stage |
| 3 | South Africa | 7 | 5 | 2 | 0 | 10 | −0.379 | Advanced to the knockout stage |
| 4 | India (H) | 7 | 3 | 3 | 1 | 7 | 0.628 | Advanced to the knockout stage |
| 5 | Sri Lanka (H) | 7 | 1 | 3 | 3 | 5 | −1.035 | |
| 6 | New Zealand | 7 | 1 | 4 | 2 | 4 | −0.876 | |
| 7 | Bangladesh | 7 | 1 | 5 | 1 | 3 | −0.578 | |
| 8 | Pakistan | 7 | 0 | 4 | 3 | 3 | −2.651 | |

Source: International Cricket Council
ESPN Cricinfo
(H) Host

Match 1
30 September 2025
15:00 (D/N)
Scorecard

| India; 269/8 (47 overs) | v | Sri Lanka; 211 (45.4 overs) |
| Amanjot Kaur 57 (56); Inoka Ranaweera 4/46 (9 overs) | | Chamari Athapaththu 43 (47); Deepti Sharma 3/54 (10 overs) |

India won by 59 runs (DLS method)
Assam Cricket Association Stadium, Guwahati
Umpires: Claire Polosak (Aus) and Eloise Sheridan (Aus)
Player of the match: Deepti Sharma (Ind)

- Sri Lanka won the toss and elected to field.

Match 6
5 October 2025
15:00 (D/N)
Scorecard

| India; 247 (50 overs) | v | Pakistan; 159 (43 overs) |
| Harleen Deol 46 (65); Diana Baig 4/69 (10 overs) | | Sidra Ameen 81 (106); Kranti Goud 3/20 (10 overs) |

India won by 88 runs
R. Premadasa Stadium, Colombo
Umpires: Lauren Agenbag (SA) and Nimali Perera (SL)
Player of the match: Kranti Goud (Ind)

- Pakistan won the toss and elected to field.

Match 10
9 October 2025
15:00 (D/N)
Scorecard

| India; 251 (49.5 overs) | v | South Africa; 252/7 (48.5 overs) |
| Richa Ghosh 94 (77); Chloe Tryon 3/32 (10 overs) | | Nadine de Klerk 84* (54); Sneh Rana 2/47 (10 overs) |

South Africa won by 3 wickets
ACA–VDCA Cricket Stadium, Visakhapatnam
Umpires: Kim Cotton (NZ) and Jacqueline Williams (WI)
Player of the match: Nadine de Klerk (SA)

- South Africa won the toss and elected to field.

Match 13
12 October 2025
15:00 (D/N)
Scorecard

| India | v | Australia |

ACA–VDCA Cricket Stadium, Visakhapatnam

Match 20
19 October 2025
15:00 (D/N)
Scorecard

| India | v | England |

Holkar Stadium, Indore

Match 24
23 October 2025
15:00 (D/N)
Scorecard

| India | v | New Zealand |

Assam Cricket Association Stadium, Guwahati

Match 28
26 October 2025
15:00 (D/N)
Scorecard

| India | v | Bangladesh |

M. Chinnaswamy Stadium, Bengaluru

=== Ireland Women's tour of India ===
The Ireland women's cricket team toured India in January 2025 to play three One Day International (ODI) matches against India women's cricket team. The series formed part of the 2022–2025 ICC Women's Championship. It was the Ireland women's side's first tour to India and first ever bilateral series between the two sides.

India won the first match by six wickets, with Pratika Rawal and Tejal Hasabnis' match winning performance. The hosts won the second match by 116 runs and secured the series 2–0, with Jemimah Rodrigues' maiden ODI century (102) India recorded their highest total in women's ODIs (370). Later it broke in third ODI when India scored 435. With the magnificent maiden century of Pratika Rawal (154) and Smriti Mandhana's 10th and fastest century, India won final ODI match by 304 run, which was India's biggest margin of victory in terms of runs.

==== 1st ODI ====
10 January 2025
11:00
Scorecard

| Ireland; 238/7 (50 overs) | v | India; 241/4 (34.3 overs) |
| Gaby Lewis 92 (129); Priya Mishra 2/56 (9 overs) | | Pratika Rawal 89 (96); Aimee Maguire 3/57 (8 overs) |

India won by 6 wickets
Niranjan Shah Stadium, Rajkot
Umpires: Kim Cotton (NZ) and Akshay Totre (Ind)
Player of the match: Pratika Rawal (Ind)

- Ireland won the toss and elected to bat.
- Women's Championship points: India 2, Ireland 0.

==== 2nd ODI ====
12 January 2025
11:00
Scorecard

| India; 370/5 (50 overs) | v | Ireland; 254/7 (50 overs) |
| Jemimah Rodrigues 102 (91); Orla Prendergast 2/75 (8 overs) | | Christina Coulter Reilly 80 (113); Deepti Sharma 3/37 (10 overs) |

India won by 116 runs
Niranjan Shah Stadium, Rajkot
Umpires: Vrinda Rathi (Ind) and Virender Sharma (Ind)
Player of the match: Jemimah Rodrigues (Ind)

- India won the toss and elected to bat.
- Women's Championship points: India 2, Ireland 0.

==== 3rd ODI ====
15 January 2025
11:00
Scorecard

| India; 435/5 (50 overs) | v | Ireland; 131 (31.4 overs) |
| Pratika Rawal 154 (129); Orla Prendergast 2/71 (8 overs) | | Sarah Forbes 41 (44); Deepti Sharma 3/27 (8.4 overs) |

India won by 304 runs
Niranjan Shah Stadium, Rajkot
Umpires: Kim Cotton (NZ) and Akshay Totre (Ind)
Player of the match: Pratika Rawal (Ind)

- India won the toss and elected to bat.
- Women's Championship points: India 2, Ireland 0.

=== Under-19 Women's T20 World Cup ===
India entered as the defending champions in the 2025 Under-19 Women's T20 World Cup, held in Malaysia from 18 January to 2 February 2025. India won their second consecutive title by defeating South Africa by 9 wickets in the final.

==== Group Stage ====
| Pos | Team | Pld | W | L | T | NR | Pts | NRR | Qualification |
|---|---|---|---|---|---|---|---|---|---|
| 1 | India | 3 | 3 | 0 | 0 | 0 | 6 | 5.035 | Advanced to the Super 6 |
| 2 | Sri Lanka | 3 | 2 | 1 | 0 | 0 | 4 | 2.667 | Advanced to the Super 6 |
| 3 | West Indies | 3 | 1 | 2 | 0 | 0 | 2 | −2.119 | Advanced to the Super 6 |
| 4 | Malaysia (H) | 3 | 0 | 3 | 0 | 0 | 0 | −5.261 | Advanced to the play-offs |

Source: ESPNcricinfo
(H) Host

19 January 2025
14:30
Scorecard

| West Indies; 44 (13.2 overs) | v | India; 47/1 (4.2 overs) |
| Kenika Cassar 15 (29); Parunika Sisodia 3/7 (2.2 overs) | | Sanika Chalke 18* (11); Jahzara Claxton 1/18 (2 overs) |

India won by 9 wickets
Bayuemas Oval, Pandamaran
Umpires: Shathira Jakir (Ban) and Dedunu Silva (SL)
Player of the match: VJ Joshitha (Ind)

- India won the toss and elected to field.

21 January 2025
14:30
Scorecard

| Malaysia; 31 (14.3 overs) | v | India; 32/0 (2.5 overs) |
| Nazatul Hidayah Husna 5 (10); Vaishnavi Sharma 5/5 (4 overs) | | Gongadi Trisha 27* (12) |

India won by 10 wickets
Bayuemas Oval, Pandamaran
Umpires: Rizwan Akram (Ned) and Vijaya Mallela (USA)
Player of the match: Vaishnavi Sharma (Ind)

- India won the toss and elected to field.

23 January 2025
14:30
Scorecard

| India; 118/9 (20 overs) | v | Sri Lanka; 58/9 (20 overs) |
| Gongadi Trisha 49 (44); Pramudi Methsara 2/10 (3 overs) | | Rashmika Sewwandi 15 (12); Parunika Sisodia 2/7 (4 overs) |

India won by 60 runs
Bayuemas Oval, Pandamaran
Umpires: Vijaya Mallela (USA) and Aidan Seaver (Ire)
Player of the match: Gongadi Trisha (Ind)

- Sri Lanka won the toss and elected to field.

==== Super Six ====
| Pos | Team | Pld | W | L | T | NR | Pts | NRR | Qualification |
|---|---|---|---|---|---|---|---|---|---|
| 1 | India | 4 | 4 | 0 | 0 | 0 | 8 | 5.724 | Advanced to the semi-finals |
| 2 | Australia | 4 | 3 | 1 | 0 | 0 | 6 | 1.377 | Advanced to the semi-finals |
| 3 | Sri Lanka | 4 | 2 | 1 | 0 | 1 | 5 | 0.550 | |
| 4 | Bangladesh | 4 | 2 | 2 | 0 | 0 | 4 | −0.500 | |
| 5 | Scotland | 4 | 0 | 3 | 0 | 1 | 1 | −4.595 | |
| 6 | West Indies | 4 | 0 | 4 | 0 | 0 | 0 | −4.153 | |

Source: ESPNcricinfo

26 January 2025
14:30
Scorecard

| Bangladesh; 64/8 (20 overs) | v | India; 66/2 (7.1 overs) |
| Sumaiya Akter 21* (29); Vaishnavi Sharma 3/15 (4 overs) | | Gongadi Trisha 40 (31); Habiba Islam 1/15 (2 overs) |

India won by 8 wickets
Bayuemas Oval, Pandamaran
Umpires: Ashlee Gibbons (Aus) and Saleema Imtiaz (Pak)
Player of the match: Vaishnavi Sharma (Ind)

- India won the toss and elected to field.

28 January 2025
14:30
Scorecard

| India; 208/1 (20 overs) | v | Scotland; 58 (14 overs) |
| Gongadi Trisha 110* (59); Maisie Maceira 1/25 (4 overs) | | Pippa Kelly 12 (8); Aayushi Shukla 4/8 (3 overs) |

India won by 150 runs
Bayuemas Oval, Pandamaran
Umpires: Maria Abbott (WI) and Kerrin Klaaste (SA)
Player of the match: Gongadi Trisha (Ind)

- Scotland won the toss and elected to field.
- Gongadi Trisha (Ind) scored her maiden century in YWT20I. She also became the first player to score a century in the history of U19 Women's T20 World Cup.

==== Semi-final ====
31 January 2025
14:30
Scorecard

| England; 113/8 (20 overs) | v | India; 117/1 (15 overs) |
| Davina Perrin 45 (40); Parunika Sisodia 3/21 (4 overs) | | G Kamalini 56* (50); Phoebe Brett 1/30 (4 overs) |

India won by 9 wickets
Bayuemas Oval, Pandamaran
Umpires: Ashlee Gibbons (Aus) and Kerrin Klaaste (SA)
Player of the match: Parunika Sisodia (Ind)

- England won the toss and elected to bat.

==== Final ====
2 February 2025
14:30
Scorecard

| South Africa; 82 (20 overs) | v | India; 84/1 (11.2 overs) |
| Mieke van Voorst 23 (18); Gongadi Trisha 3/15 (4 overs) | | Gongadi Trisha 44* (33); Kayla Reyneke 1/14 (4 overs) |

India won by 9 wickets
Bayuemas Oval, Pandamaran
Umpires: Nitin Bathi (Ned) and Ashlee Gibbons (Aus)
Player of the match: Gongadi Trisha (Ind)

- South Africa won the toss and elected to bat.

=== England's tour of India ===
The India cricket team hosted the England cricket team to play three One Day International (ODI) and five Twenty20 International (T20I) matches from 22 January to 12 February 2025. The ODI series was used as preparation ahead of the 2025 ICC Champions Trophy.

==== 1st T20I ====
22 January 2025
19:00 (N)
Scorecard

| England; 132 (20 overs) | v | India; 133/3 (12.5 overs) |
| Jos Buttler 68 (44); Varun Chakravarthy 3/23 (4 overs) | | Abhishek Sharma 79 (34); Jofra Archer 2/21 (4 overs) |

India won by 7 wickets
Eden Gardens, Kolkata
Umpires: Jayaraman Madanagopal (Ind) and Nitin Menon (Ind)
Player of the match: Varun Chakravarthy (Ind)

- India won the toss and elected to field.
- Arshdeep Singh became India's leading wicket taker in T20Is (97) going past Yuzvendra Chahal (96).

==== 2nd T20I ====
25 January 2025
19:00 (N)
Scorecard

| England; 165/9 (20 overs) | v | India; 166/8 (19.2 overs) |
| Jos Buttler 45 (30); Axar Patel 2/32 (4 overs) | | Tilak Varma 72* (55); Brydon Carse 3/29 (4 overs) |

India won by 2 wickets
M. A. Chidambaram Stadium, Chennai
Umpires: K. N. Ananthapadmanabhan (Ind) and Virender Sharma (Ind)
Player of the match: Tilak Varma (Ind)

- India won the toss and elected to field.
- Jamie Smith (Eng) made his T20I debut.

==== 3rd T20I ====
28 January 2025
19:00 (N)
Scorecard

| England; 171/9 (20 overs) | v | India; 145/9 (20 overs) |
| Ben Duckett 51 (28); Varun Chakravarthy 5/24 (4 overs) | | Hardik Pandya 40 (35); Jamie Overton 3/24 (4 overs) |

England won by 26 runs
Niranjan Shah Stadium, Rajkot
Umpires: K. N. Ananthapadmanabhan (Ind) and Rohan Pandit (Ind)
Player of the match: Varun Chakravarthy (Ind)

- India won the toss and elected to field.

==== 4th T20I ====
31 January 2025
19:00 (N)
Scorecard

| India; 181/9 (20 overs) | v | England; 166 (19.4 overs) |
| Hardik Pandya 53 (30); Saqib Mahmood 3/35 (4 overs) | | Harry Brook 51 (26); Ravi Bishnoi 3/28 (4 overs) |

India won by 15 runs
Maharashtra Cricket Association Stadium, Pune
Umpires: Jayaraman Madanagopal (Ind) and Nitin Menon (Ind)
Player of the match: Shivam Dube (Ind)

- England won the toss and elected to field.
- Saqib Mahmood (Eng) became only the second bowler, after West Indies' Jerome Taylor to complete a triple wicket maiden over in T20Is.
- Harshit Rana (Ind) made his T20I debut after replacing Shivam Dube (Ind) as a concussion substitute for India during the second innings. He became the first player from a full member team to make his T20I debut as a concussion substitute.

==== 5th T20I ====
2 February 2025
19:00 (N)
Scorecard

| India; 247/9 (20 overs) | v | England; 97 (10.3 overs) |
| Abhishek Sharma 135 (54); Brydon Carse 3/38 (4 overs) | | Phil Salt 55 (23); Mohammed Shami 3/25 (2.3 overs) |

India won by 150 runs
Wankhede Stadium, Mumbai
Umpires: Rohan Pandit (Ind) and Virender Sharma (Ind)
Player of the match: Abhishek Sharma (Ind)

- England won the toss and elected to field.
- India made their highest powerplay score (95/1).
- Abhishek Sharma (Ind) set the highest individual score (135) surpassing Shubman Gill (126) and hit most sixes in an innings (13) going past Rohit Sharma (10) by an Indian player in T20Is.
- India recorded their second-biggest victory in T20Is.

==== 1st ODI ====
6 February 2025
13:30 (D/N)
Scorecard

| England; 248 (47.4 overs) | v | India; 251/6 (38.4 overs) |
| Jos Buttler 52 (67); Ravindra Jadeja 3/26 (9 overs) | | Shubman Gill 87 (96); Adil Rashid 2/49 (10 overs) |

India won by 4 wickets
Vidarbha Cricket Association Stadium, Nagpur
Umpires: K. N. Ananthapadmanabhan (Ind) and Sharfuddoula (Ban)
Player of the match: Shubman Gill (Ind)

- England won the toss and elected to bat.
- Yashasvi Jaiswal and Harshit Rana (Ind) both made their ODI debuts.
- Ravindra Jadeja (Ind) took his 600th wicket in international cricket, and thus became the first Indian spinner to complete 6000 runs and 600 wickets in international cricket.
- Harshit Rana became the first Indian bowler to take a 3-wicket haul on debut in all three formats of international cricket.

==== 2nd ODI ====
9 February 2025
13:30 (D/N)
Scorecard

| England; 304 (49.5 overs) | v | India; 308/6 (44.3 overs) |
| Joe Root 69 (72); Ravindra Jadeja 3/35 (10 overs) | | Rohit Sharma 119 (90); Jamie Overton 2/27 (5 overs) |

India won by 4 wickets
Barabati Stadium, Cuttack
Umpires: Chris Brown (NZ) and Jayaraman Madanagopal (Ind)
Player of the match: Rohit Sharma (Ind)

- England won the toss and elected to bat.
- Varun Chakravarthy (Ind) made his ODI debut.
- Rohit Sharma (Ind) played his 50th ODI as captain.
- Joe Root (Eng) scored his 56th fifty-plus score in ODIs, the most for England breaking the record of Eoin Morgan.
- Rohit Sharma surpassed Sachin Tendulkar to become the 2nd highest run-scorer as an opener for India in international cricket.

==== 3rd ODI ====
12 February 2025
13:30 (D/N)
Scorecard

| India; 356 (50 overs) | v | England; 214 (34.2 overs) |
| Shubman Gill 112 (102); Adil Rashid 4/64 (10 overs) | | Gus Atkinson 38 (19); Axar Patel 2/22 (6.2 overs) |

India won by 142 runs
Narendra Modi Stadium, Ahmedabad
Umpires: Sharfuddoula (Ban) and Virender Sharma (Ind)
Player of the match: Shubman Gill (Ind)

- England won the toss and elected to field.
- Shubman Gill (Ind) became the fastest batsman to cross 2,500 runs, in terms of innings (50), surpassing South Africa's Hashim Amla in ODIs.
- Virat Kohli (Ind) scored 16,000 runs across all formats in Asia, becoming the 4th player overall to achieve this milestone. He also became the fastest to reach this feat in just 340 innings, surpassing Kumar Sangakkara's 410 innings record.
- Shubman Gill scored his 5,000th run in international cricket.
- Shubman Gill became only the fifth player in international cricket history to score a century in all three formats at a single venue.

=== Women's Premier League ===
The 2025 Women's Premier League was the third season of the Women's Premier League, featuring five teams and was held from 14 February to 15 March 2025. The tournament was played across four venues: Bengaluru, Lucknow, Mumbai and Vadodara.

==== League Stage ====
| Pos | Team | Pld | W | L | Pts | NRR | Qualification |
|---|---|---|---|---|---|---|---|
| 1 | Delhi Capitals (R) | 8 | 5 | 3 | 10 | 0.396 | Advanced to the Final |
| 2 | Mumbai Indians (C) | 8 | 5 | 3 | 10 | 0.192 | Advanced to the Eliminator |
| 3 | Gujarat Giants (3rd) | 8 | 4 | 4 | 8 | 0.228 | Advanced to the Eliminator |
| 4 | Royal Challengers Bengaluru | 8 | 3 | 5 | 6 | −0.196 | Eliminated |
| 5 | UP Warriorz | 8 | 3 | 5 | 6 | −0.624 | Eliminated |

Source: ESPNcricinfo
(C) Champions; (R) Runners-up

| Team | Group matches | | | | | | | | Playoffs | |
| Team | 1 | 2 | 3 | 4 | 5 | 6 | 7 | 8 | E | F |
|---|---|---|---|---|---|---|---|---|---|---|
| Delhi Capitals | 2 | 2 | 4 | 4 | 6 | 8 | 10 | 10 | | L |
| Gujarat Giants | 0 | 2 | 2 | 2 | 4 | 6 | 8 | 8 | L | |
| Mumbai Indians | 0 | 2 | 4 | 6 | 6 | 8 | 10 | 10 | W | W |
| Royal Challengers Bengaluru | 2 | 4 | 4 | 4 | 4 | 4 | 4 | 6 | | |
| UP Warriorz | 0 | 0 | 2 | 4 | 4 | 4 | 4 | 6 | | |

| Win | Loss | No result |

- Note: The total points at the end of each group match are listed.
- Note: Click on the points (group matches) or W/L (playoffs) to see the match summary.

| Visitor team → | DC | GG | MI | RCB | UPW |
| Home team ↓ | DC | GG | MI | RCB | UPW |
|---|---|---|---|---|---|
| Delhi Capitals | | Delhi; 6 wickets | Delhi; 9 wickets | Bengaluru; 8 wickets | Lucknow; 33 runs |
| Gujarat Giants | Gujarat; 5 wickets | | Mumbai; 5 wickets | Bengaluru; 6 wickets | Gujarat; 6 wickets |
| Mumbai Indians | Delhi; 2 wickets | Mumbai; 9 runs | | Bengaluru; 11 runs | Mumbai; 8 wickets |
| Royal Challengers Bengaluru | Delhi; 9 wickets | Gujarat; 6 wickets | Mumbai; 4 wickets | | Lucknow; Super Over |
| UP Warriorz | Delhi; 7 wickets | Gujarat; 81 runs | Mumbai; 6 wickets | Lucknow; 12 runs | |

| Home team won | Visitor team won |

- Note: Results listed are according to the home (horizontal) and visitor (vertical) teams.
- Note: Click on a result to see a summary of the match.

==== Playoffs ====
Eliminator

Final

1
Delhi Capitals
141/9 (20 overs)

2
Mumbai Indians
213/4 (20 overs)

EW
Mumbai Indians
149/7 (20 overs)

3
Gujarat Giants
166 (19.2 overs)

==== Final ====
Final
15 March 2025
20:00 (N)
Scorecard

| Mumbai Indians; 149/7 (20 overs) | v | Delhi Capitals; 141/9 (20 overs) |
| Harmanpreet Kaur 66 (44); Marizanne Kapp 2/11 (4 overs) | | Marizanne Kapp 40 (26); Nat Sciver-Brunt 3/30 (4 overs) |

Mumbai Indians won by 8 runs
Brabourne Stadium, Mumbai
Umpires: Ankita Guha and Anish Sahasrabudhe
Player of the match: Harmanpreet Kaur (Mumbai Indians)

- Delhi Capitals won the toss and elected to field.

Match scorecard

1st innings

Mumbai Indians batting
| Player | Status | Runs | Balls | 4s | 6s | Strike rate |
|---|---|---|---|---|---|---|
| Yastika Bhatia | c Rodrigues b Kapp | 8 | 14 | 1 | 0 | 57.14 |
| Hayley Matthews | b Kapp | 3 | 10 | 0 | 0 | 30.00 |
| Nat Sciver-Brunt | c Mani b Charani | 30 | 28 | 4 | 0 | 107.14 |
| Harmanpreet Kaur | c Kapp b Sutherland | 66 | 44 | 9 | 2 | 150.00 |
| Amelia Kerr | c Verma b Jonassen | 2 | 3 | 0 | 0 | 66.66 |
| Sajeevan Sajana | lbw b Jonassen | 0 | 2 | 0 | 0 | 0.00 |
| G Kamalini | st †Bryce b Charani | 10 | 7 | 0 | 1 | 142.85 |
| Amanjot Kaur | not out | 14 | 7 | 2 | 0 | 200.00 |
| Sanskriti Gupta | not out | 8 | 5 | 1 | 0 | 160.00 |
| Shabnim Ismail | did not bat | | | | | |
| Saika Ishaque | did not bat | | | | | |
| Extras | (b 1, w 7) | 8 | | | | |
| Total | (7 wickets; 20 overs) | 149 | | 17 | 3 | RR: 7.45 |

Fall of wickets: 5/1 (Matthews, 3 ov), 14/2 (Bhatia, 4.3 ov), 103/3 (Sciver-Brunt, 14.5 ov), 112/4 (Kerr, 15.5 ov), 112/5 (Sajana, 16 ov), 118/6 (Harmanpreet, 17.1 ov), 132/7 (Kamalini, 18.4 ov)

Delhi Capitals bowling
| Bowler | Overs | Maidens | Runs | Wickets | Econ | Wides | NBs |
|---|---|---|---|---|---|---|---|
| Marizanne Kapp | 4 | 0 | 11 | 2 | 2.75 | 0 | 0 |
| Shikha Pandey | 4 | 0 | 29 | 0 | 7.25 | 0 | 0 |
| Annabel Sutherland | 4 | 0 | 29 | 1 | 7.25 | 1 | 0 |
| Jess Jonassen | 3 | 0 | 26 | 2 | 8.66 | 0 | 0 |
| Shree Charani | 4 | 0 | 43 | 2 | 10.75 | 2 | 0 |
| Minnu Mani | 1 | 0 | 10 | 0 | 10.00 | 0 | 0 |

2nd innings

Delhi Capitals batting
| Player | Status | Runs | Balls | 4s | 6s | Strike rate |
|---|---|---|---|---|---|---|
| Meg Lanning | b Sciver-Brunt | 13 | 9 | 2 | 0 | 144.44 |
| Shafali Verma | lbw b Ismail | 4 | 9 | 0 | 0 | 44.44 |
| Jess Jonassen | c †Bhatia b Kerr | 13 | 15 | 2 | 0 | 86.66 |
| Jemimah Rodrigues | c & b Kerr | 30 | 21 | 4 | 0 | 142.85 |
| Annabel Sutherland | st †Bhatia b Ishaque | 2 | 5 | 0 | 0 | 40.00 |
| Marizanne Kapp | c Matthews b Sciver-Brunt | 40 | 26 | 5 | 2 | 153.84 |
| Sarah Bryce | run out (Gupta/†Bhatia) | 5 | 5 | 0 | 0 | 100.00 |
| Niki Prasad | not out | 25 | 23 | 1 | 1 | 108.69 |
| Shikha Pandey | b Sciver-Brunt | 0 | 1 | 0 | 0 | 0.00 |
| Minnu Mani | c Sajana b Matthews | 4 | 2 | 1 | 0 | 200.00 |
| Shree Charani | not out | 3 | 4 | 0 | 0 | 75.00 |
| Extras | (lb 1, w 1) | 2 | | | | |
| Total | (9 wickets; 20 overs) | 141 | | 15 | 3 | RR: 7.05 |

Fall of wickets: 15/1 (Lanning, 2 ov), 17/2 (Verma, 3 ov), 37/3 (Jonassen, 6.2 ov), 44/4 (Sutherland, 8 ov), 66/5 (Rodrigues, 10.4 ov), 83/6 (Bryce, 12.5 ov), 123/7 (Kapp, 17.4 ov), 123/8 (Pandey, 17.5 ov), 128/9 (Mani, 18.2 ov)

Mumbai Indians bowling
| Bowler | Overs | Maidens | Runs | Wickets | Econ | Wides | NBs |
|---|---|---|---|---|---|---|---|
| Shabnim Ismail | 4 | 0 | 15 | 1 | 3.75 | 0 | 0 |
| Nat Sciver-Brunt | 4 | 0 | 30 | 3 | 7.50 | 0 | 0 |
| Hayley Matthews | 4 | 0 | 37 | 1 | 9.25 | 1 | 0 |
| Amelia Kerr | 4 | 0 | 25 | 2 | 6.25 | 0 | 0 |
| Saika Ishaque | 4 | 0 | 33 | 1 | 8.25 | 0 | 0 |

=== Champions Trophy ===
India was one of the eight teams that participated in the 2025 Champions Trophy held in Pakistan and United Arab Emirates from 19 February to 9 March 2025. India qualified for the tournament after finishing in the top eight of the 2023 Cricket World Cup. In November 2024, the Board of Control for Cricket in India (BCCI) informed the International Cricket Council that India wouldn't travel to Pakistan for the tournament, citing security concerns. On 19 December 2024, following an agreement between BCCI and PCB, the ICC in an update issued on India and Pakistan hosted matches at ICC events, established that the ICC Champions Trophy 2025 will be played across Pakistan and a neutral venue.

India became the champions by defeating New Zealand in the final and also became the first team to win three Champions Trophy titles.

==== Group Stage ====
| Pos | Team | Pld | W | L | NR | Pts | NRR | Qualification |
|---|---|---|---|---|---|---|---|---|
| 1 | India | 3 | 3 | 0 | 0 | 6 | 0.715 | Advanced to the knockout stage |
| 2 | New Zealand | 3 | 2 | 1 | 0 | 4 | 0.267 | Advanced to the knockout stage |
| 3 | Bangladesh | 3 | 0 | 2 | 1 | 1 | −0.443 | Eliminated |
| 4 | Pakistan (H) | 3 | 0 | 2 | 1 | 1 | −1.087 | Eliminated |

Source: ESPNcricinfo
Rules for classification: 1) Points; 2) Wins; 3) Net run rate; 4) Results of games between tied teams; 5) Initial group stage seedings
(H) Host

20 February 2025
13:00 UTC+4 (D/N)
Scorecard

| Bangladesh; 228 (49.4 overs) | v | India; 231/4 (46.3 overs) |
| Towhid Hridoy 100 (118); Mohammed Shami 5/53 (10 overs) | | Shubman Gill 101* (129); Rishad Hossain 2/38 (10 overs) |

India won by 6 wickets
Dubai International Cricket Stadium, Dubai
Umpires: Adrian Holdstock (SA) and Paul Reiffel (Aus)
Player of the match: Shubman Gill (Ind)

- Bangladesh won the toss and elected to bat.
- Ravindra Jadeja (Ind) played in his 200th ODI match.
- Mohammed Shami (Ind) took his 200th wicket in ODIs. He became the joint second-fastest man to take 200 ODI wickets, in terms of matches played and the fastest to 200 by balls bowled.
- Shami also took his 60th wicket in an ICC ODI tournament: the most by an Indian bowler, moving past Zaheer Khan.
- The 154-run partnership between Jaker Ali and Towhid Hridoy was Bangladesh's highest for the 6th wicket in ODIs breaking the record of Mahmudullah and Jaker Ali.
- Towhid Hridoy (Ban) scored his maiden century in ODIs.
- Rohit Sharma (Ind) completed 11,000 runs in ODIs, becoming the fourth Indian batter to do so. He became the second-quickest to reach 11,000 runs in 261 innings, after Virat Kohli.
- Rohit Sharma (Ind) reached 100 wins as an international captain.

23 February 2025
13:00 UTC+4 (D/N)
Scorecard

| Pakistan; 241 (49.4 overs) | v | India; 244/4 (42.3 overs) |
| Saud Shakeel 62 (76); Kuldeep Yadav 3/40 (9 overs) | | Virat Kohli 100* (111); Shaheen Afridi 2/74 (8 overs) |

India won by 6 wickets
Dubai International Cricket Stadium, Dubai
Umpires: Richard Illingworth (Eng) and Paul Reiffel (Aus)
Player of the match: Virat Kohli (Ind)

- Pakistan won the toss and elected to bat.
- Virat Kohli (Ind) took his 158th catch, the most for India in ODIs, going past Mohammad Azharuddin (156).
- Virat Kohli (Ind) completed 14,000 runs in 287 innings in ODIs, becoming the fastest player to do so, going past Sachin Tendulkar's 350 innings. He also became the third-highest run-scorer (27,503 runs) in international cricket, surpassing Ricky Ponting.
- Virat Kohli (Ind) scored an unbeaten 100, marking his 51st century in One Day Internationals. His century brought his tally of 50+ scores in ICC ODI events to 23, equaling Sachin Tendulkar's record. At 36 years and 110 days old, he became the oldest player to record a century in the ICC Champions Trophy.

2 March 2025
13:00 UTC+4 (D/N)
Scorecard

| India; 249/9 (50 overs) | v | New Zealand; 205 (45.3 overs) |
| Shreyas Iyer 79 (98); Matt Henry 5/42 (8 overs) | | Kane Williamson 81 (120); Varun Chakravarthy 5/42 (10 overs) |

India won by 44 runs
Dubai International Cricket Stadium, Dubai
Umpires: Michael Gough (Eng) and Richard Illingworth (Eng)
Player of the match: Varun Chakravarthy (Ind)

- New Zealand won the toss and elected to field.
- Virat Kohli (Ind) played in his 300th ODI match.
- Varun Chakravarthy (Ind) took his maiden five-wicket haul in ODIs and became the third Indian to do so in the Champions Trophy.

==== Semi-final ====
4 March 2025
13:00 UTC+4 (D/N)
Scorecard

| Australia; 264 (49.3 overs) | v | India; 267/6 (48.1 overs) |
| Steve Smith 73 (96); Mohammed Shami 3/48 (10 overs) | | Virat Kohli 84 (98); Nathan Ellis 2/49 (10 overs) |

India won by 4 wickets
Dubai International Cricket Stadium, Dubai
Umpires: Chris Gaffaney (NZ) and Richard Illingworth (Eng)
Player of the match: Virat Kohli (Ind)

- Australia won the toss and elected to bat.
- Rohit Sharma (Ind) surpassed Chris Gayle for the most sixes in ICC ODI events.
- Kohli became India's highest run-getter in Champions Trophy, surpassing Shikhar Dhawan's 701 runs.
- Kohli became the first ever cricketer to score 1,000 runs and 10 fifty-plus scores in ICC knockout matches.
- KL Rahul (Ind) completed 3,000 runs in 77 innings in ODIs.
- India qualified for the third consecutive final in Champions Trophy.
- Rohit Sharma (Ind) became the first captain to reach the final in all four ICC men's tournaments.
- Steve Smith and Glenn Maxwell (Aus) both played their last ODI match.
- India surpassed Australia with 14 ICC final appearances, the most in history.

==== Final ====
9 March 2025
13:00 UTC+4 (D/N)
Scorecard

| New Zealand; 251/7 (50 overs) | v | India; 254/6 (49 overs) |
| Daryl Mitchell 63 (101); Kuldeep Yadav 2/40 (10 overs) | | Rohit Sharma 76 (83); Michael Bracewell 2/28 (10 overs) |

India won by 4 wickets
Dubai International Cricket Stadium, Dubai
Umpires: Richard Illingworth (Eng) and Paul Reiffel (Aus)
Player of the match: Rohit Sharma (Ind)

- New Zealand won the toss and elected to bat.
- Daryl Mitchell (NZ) completed 1,000 runs in ICC limited-over tournaments.
- Rohit Sharma (Ind) became the first captain to win the Player of the Match award in the final of the Champions Trophy.
- Rohit Sharma became the second Indian captain after MS Dhoni to win multiple ICC trophies.
- India won their record third Champions Trophy title after 2002 and 2013.

=== Indian Premier League ===
The 2025 Indian Premier League was the 18th edition of the Indian Premier League. The tournament featured 10 teams competing in 74 matches. It began on 22 March and was held across 13 venues before being suspended on 9 May due to the 2025 India–Pakistan crisis. The matches resumed from 17 May across six venues, with the final rescheduled from 25 May to 3 June, Royal Challengers Bengaluru defeated Punjab Kings by 6 runs to win their maiden title after 18 years.

==== League Stage ====
League stage standings
| Pos | Grp | Team | Pld | W | L | NR | Pts | NRR | Qualification |
|---|---|---|---|---|---|---|---|---|---|
| 1 | A | Punjab Kings | 14 | 9 | 4 | 1 | 19 | 0.372 | Advance to Qualifier 1 |
| 2 | A | Royal Challengers Bengaluru | 14 | 9 | 4 | 1 | 19 | 0.301 | Advance to Qualifier 1 |
| 3 | B | Gujarat Titans | 14 | 9 | 5 | 0 | 18 | 0.254 | Advance to Eliminator |
| 4 | B | Mumbai Indians | 14 | 8 | 6 | 0 | 16 | 1.142 | Advance to Eliminator |
| 5 | B | Delhi Capitals | 14 | 7 | 6 | 1 | 15 | −0.011 | Eliminated |
| 6 | B | Sunrisers Hyderabad | 14 | 6 | 7 | 1 | 13 | −0.241 | Eliminated |
| 7 | B | Lucknow Super Giants | 14 | 6 | 8 | 0 | 12 | −0.376 | Eliminated |
| 8 | A | Kolkata Knight Riders | 14 | 5 | 7 | 2 | 12 | −0.305 | Eliminated |
| 9 | A | Rajasthan Royals | 14 | 4 | 10 | 0 | 8 | −0.549 | Eliminated |
| 10 | A | Chennai Super Kings | 14 | 4 | 10 | 0 | 8 | −0.647 | Eliminated |

Source: ESPNcricinfo

| Team | Group matches | | | | | | | | | | | | | | Playoffs | | | |
| Team | 1 | 2 | 3 | 4 | 5 | 6 | 7 | 8 | 9 | 10 | 11 | 12 | 13 | 14 | Q1 | E | Q2 | F |
|---|---|---|---|---|---|---|---|---|---|---|---|---|---|---|---|---|---|---|
| Chennai Super Kings | 2 | 2 | 2 | 2 | 2 | 2 | 4 | 4 | 4 | 4 | 4 | 6 | 6 | 8 | | | | |
| Delhi Capitals | 2 | 4 | 6 | 8 | 8 | 10 | 10 | 12 | 12 | 12 | 13 | 13 | 13 | 15 | | | | |
| Gujarat Titans | 0 | 2 | 4 | 6 | 8 | 8 | 10 | 12 | 12 | 14 | 16 | 18 | 18 | 18 | | L | | |
| Kolkata Knight Riders | 0 | 2 | 2 | 4 | 4 | 6 | 6 | 6 | 7 | 9 | 11 | 11 | 12 | 12 | | | | |
| Lucknow Super Giants | 0 | 2 | 2 | 4 | 6 | 8 | 8 | 10 | 10 | 10 | 10 | 10 | 12 | 12 | | | | |
| Mumbai Indians | 0 | 0 | 2 | 2 | 2 | 4 | 6 | 8 | 10 | 12 | 14 | 14 | 16 | 16 | | W | L | |
| Punjab Kings | 2 | 4 | 4 | 6 | 6 | 8 | 10 | 10 | 11 | 13 | 15 | 17 | 17 | 19 | L | | W | L |
| Rajasthan Royals | 0 | 0 | 2 | 4 | 4 | 4 | 4 | 4 | 4 | 6 | 6 | 6 | 6 | 8 | | | | |
| Royal Challengers Bengaluru | 2 | 4 | 4 | 6 | 6 | 8 | 8 | 10 | 12 | 14 | 16 | 17 | 17 | 19 | W | | | W |
| Sunrisers Hyderabad | 2 | 2 | 2 | 2 | 2 | 4 | 4 | 4 | 6 | 6 | 7 | 9 | 11 | 13 | | | | |

| Win | Loss | No result |

- Note: The total points at the end of each group match are listed.
- Note: Click on the points (group matches) or W/L (playoffs) to see the match summary.

| Visitor team → | CSK | DC | GT | KKR | LSG | MI | PBKS | RR | RCB | SRH |
| Home team ↓ | CSK | DC | GT | KKR | LSG | MI | PBKS | RR | RCB | SRH |
|---|---|---|---|---|---|---|---|---|---|---|
| Chennai Super Kings | | Delhi; 25 runs | | Kolkata; 8 wickets | | Chennai; 4 wickets | Punjab; 4 wickets | Rajasthan; 6 wickets | Bengaluru; 50 runs | Hyderabad; 5 wickets |
| Delhi Capitals | | | Gujarat; 10 wickets | Kolkata; 14 runs | Delhi; 1 wicket | Mumbai; 12 runs | | Delhi; Super Over | Bengaluru; 6 wickets | Delhi; 7 wickets |
| Gujarat Titans | Chennai; 83 runs | Gujarat; 7 wickets | | | Lucknow; 33 runs | Gujarat; 36 runs | Punjab; 11 runs | Gujarat; 58 runs | | Gujarat; 38 runs |
| Kolkata Knight Riders | Chennai; 2 wickets | | Gujarat; 39 runs | | Lucknow; 4 runs | | Match abandoned | Kolkata; 1 run | Bengaluru; 7 wickets | Kolkata; 80 runs |
| Lucknow Super Giants | Chennai; 5 wickets | Delhi; 8 wickets | Lucknow; 6 wickets | | | Lucknow; 12 runs | Punjab; 8 wickets | | Bengaluru; 6 wickets | Hyderabad; 6 wickets |
| Mumbai Indians | Mumbai; 9 wickets | Mumbai; 59 runs | Gujarat; 3 wickets (DLS) | Mumbai; 8 wickets | Mumbai; 54 runs | | | | Bengaluru; 12 runs | Mumbai; 4 wickets |
| Punjab Kings | Punjab; 18 runs | Delhi; 6 wickets | | Punjab; 16 runs | Punjab; 37 runs | Punjab; 7 wickets | | Rajasthan; 50 runs | Bengaluru; 7 wickets | |
| Rajasthan Royals | Rajasthan; 6 runs | | Rajasthan; 8 wickets | Kolkata; 8 wickets | Lucknow; 2 runs | Mumbai; 100 runs | Punjab; 10 runs | | Bengaluru; 9 wickets | |
| Royal Challengers Bengaluru | Bengaluru; 2 runs | Delhi; 6 wickets | Gujarat; 8 wickets | Match abandoned | | | Punjab; 5 wickets | Bengaluru; 11 runs | | Hyderabad; 42 runs |
| Sunrisers Hyderabad | | Match abandoned | Gujarat; 7 wickets | Hyderabad; 110 runs | Lucknow; 5 wickets | Mumbai; 7 wickets | Hyderabad; 8 wickets | Hyderabad; 44 runs | | |

| Home team won | Visitor team won |

- Note: Results listed are according to the home (horizontal) and visitor (vertical) teams.
- Note: Click on a result to see a summary of the match.

==== Playoffs ====
Qualifier 1
29 May 2025 – Mullanpur
1 | Punjab Kings | 101 (14.1 overs)
2 | Royal Challengers Bengaluru | 106/2 (10 overs)
Eliminator
30 May 2025 – Mullanpur
3 | Gujarat Titans | 208/6 (20 overs)
4 | Mumbai Indians | 228/5 (20 overs)

Qualifier 2
1 June 2025 – Ahmedabad
Q1L | Punjab Kings | 207/5 (19 overs)
EW | Mumbai Indians | 203/6 (20 overs)

Final
3 June 2025 – Ahmedabad
Q1W | Royal Challengers Bengaluru | 190/9 (20 overs)
Q2W | Punjab Kings | 184/7 (20 overs)

==== Final ====
Final
3 June 2025
19:30 (N)
Scorecard

| Royal Challengers Bengaluru; 190/9 (20 overs) | v | Punjab Kings; 184/7 (20 overs) |
| Virat Kohli 43 (35); Arshdeep Singh 3/40 (4 overs) | | Shashank Singh 61* (30); Krunal Pandya 2/17 (4 overs) |

Royal Challengers Bengaluru won by 6 runs
Narendra Modi Stadium, Ahmedabad
Umpires: Jayaraman Madanagopal (Ind) and Nitin Menon (Ind)
Player of the match: Krunal Pandya (Royal Challengers Bengaluru)

- Punjab Kings won the toss and elected to field.
- This match was originally scheduled for 25 May at the Eden Gardens, before being rescheduled.
- Royal Challengers Bengaluru won their maiden title after 18 years.

Match scorecard

"(IMP)" indicates an Impact player
"(SUB)" indicates a Substitute player

1st innings

Royal Challengers Bengaluru batting
| Player | Status | Runs | Balls | 4s | 6s | Strike rate |
|---|---|---|---|---|---|---|
| Phil Salt | c Iyer b Jamieson | 16 | 9 | 2 | 1 | 177.77 |
| Virat Kohli | c & b Omarzai | 43 | 35 | 3 | 0 | 122.85 |
| Mayank Agarwal (SUB) | c Arshdeep b Chahal | 24 | 18 | 2 | 1 | 133.33 |
| Rajat Patidar | lbw b Jamieson | 26 | 16 | 1 | 2 | 162.50 |
| Liam Livingstone | lbw b Jamieson | 25 | 15 | 0 | 2 | 166.66 |
| Jitesh Sharma | b Vyshak | 24 | 10 | 2 | 2 | 240.00 |
| Romario Shepherd | lbw b Arshdeep | 17 | 9 | 1 | 1 | 188.88 |
| Krunal Pandya | c Iyer b Arshdeep | 4 | 5 | 0 | 0 | 80.00 |
| Bhuvneshwar Kumar | c Arya b Arshdeep | 1 | 2 | 0 | 0 | 50.00 |
| Yash Dayal | not out | 1 | 1 | 0 | 0 | 100.00 |
| Josh Hazlewood | did not bat | | | | | |
| Extras 9 (w 9); Total 190/9 (20 overs) | | | | 11 | 9 | 9.50 RR |

Fall of wickets: 1–18 (Salt, 1.4 ov), 2–56 (Agarwal, 6.2 ov), 3–96 (Patidar, 10.5 ov), 4–131 (Kohli, 14.5 ov), 5–167 (Livingstone, 16.5 ov), 6–171 (Jitesh, 17.4 ov), 7–188 (Shepherd, 19.2 ov), 8–189 (Krunal, 19.4 ov), 9–190 (Kumar, 19.6)

Punjab Kings bowling
| Bowler | Overs | Maidens | Runs | Wickets | Econ | Wides | NBs |
|---|---|---|---|---|---|---|---|
| Arshdeep Singh | 4 | 0 | 40 | 3 | 10.00 | 2 | 0 |
| Kyle Jamieson | 4 | 0 | 48 | 3 | 12.00 | 3 | 0 |
| Azmatullah Omarzai | 4 | 0 | 35 | 1 | 8.75 | 2 | 0 |
| Vijaykumar Vyshak | 4 | 0 | 30 | 1 | 7.50 | 2 | 0 |
| Yuzvendra Chahal (SUB) | 4 | 0 | 37 | 1 | 9.25 | 0 | 0 |

2nd innings

Impact players
| Team | Out | In |
|---|---|---|
| Royal Challengers Bengaluru | Mayank Agarwal | Suyash Sharma |
| Punjab Kings | Yuzvendra Chahal | Prabhsimran Singh |

Punjab Kings batting
| Player | Status | Runs | Balls | 4s | 6s | Strike rate |
|---|---|---|---|---|---|---|
| Priyansh Arya | c Salt b Hazlewood | 24 | 19 | 4 | 0 | 126.31 |
| Prabhsimran Singh (IMP) | c Kumar b Krunal | 26 | 22 | 0 | 2 | 118.18 |
| Josh Inglis | c Livingstone b Krunal | 39 | 23 | 1 | 4 | 169.56 |
| Shreyas Iyer | c †Jitesh b Shepherd | 1 | 2 | 0 | 0 | 50.00 |
| Nehal Wadhera | c Krunal b Kumar | 15 | 18 | 0 | 1 | 83.33 |
| Shashank Singh | not out | 61 | 30 | 3 | 6 | 203.33 |
| Marcus Stoinis | c Dayal b Kumar | 6 | 2 | 0 | 1 | 300.00 |
| Azmatullah Omarzai | c sub (Bhandage) b Dayal | 1 | 2 | 0 | 0 | 50.00 |
| Kyle Jamieson | not out | 0 | 2 | 0 | 0 | 0.00 |
| Vijaykumar Vyshak | did not bat | | | | | |
| Arshdeep Singh | did not bat | | | | | |
| Extras 11 (lb 8, w 3); Total 184/7 (20 overs) | | | | 8 | 14 | 9.20 RR |

Fall of wickets: 1–43 (Arya, 4.6 ov), 2–72 (Prabhsimran, 8.3 ov), 3–79 (Iyer, 9.4 ov), 4–98 (Inglis, 12.1 ov), 5-136 (Wadhera, 16.2 ov), 6–142 (Stoinis, 16.4 ov), 7–145 (Omarzai, 17.2 ov)

Royal Challengers Bengaluru bowling
| Bowler | Overs | Maidens | Runs | Wickets | Econ | Wides | NBs |
|---|---|---|---|---|---|---|---|
| Bhuvneshwar Kumar | 4 | 0 | 38 | 2 | 9.50 | 0 | 0 |
| Yash Dayal | 3 | 0 | 18 | 1 | 6.00 | 0 | 0 |
| Josh Hazlewood | 4 | 0 | 54 | 1 | 13.50 | 2 | 0 |
| Krunal Pandya | 4 | 0 | 17 | 2 | 4.25 | 0 | 0 |
| Suyash Sharma (IMP) | 2 | 0 | 19 | 0 | 9.50 | 0 | 0 |
| Romario Shepherd | 3 | 0 | 30 | 1 | 10.00 | 1 | 0 |

=== 2025 Sri Lanka Women's Tri-Nation Series ===
The 2025 Sri Lanka Women's Tri-Nation Series was a cricket series that took place in Sri Lanka in April and May 2025. It was a tri-nation series involving India, South Africa and Sri Lanka cricket teams, with the matches played in One Day International (ODI) format. In the final, India defeated Sri Lanka by 97 runs to win the series.

==== Group Stage ====
| Pos | Team | Pld | W | L | T | NR | Pts | NRR | Qualification |
|---|---|---|---|---|---|---|---|---|---|
| 1 | India | 4 | 3 | 1 | 0 | 0 | 6 | 0.457 | Advanced to the final |
| 2 | Sri Lanka (H) | 4 | 2 | 2 | 0 | 0 | 4 | −0.542 | Advanced to the final |
| 3 | South Africa | 4 | 1 | 3 | 0 | 0 | 2 | 0.083 | |

Source: ESPNcricinfo
(H) Host

27 April 2025
10:00
Scorecard

| Sri Lanka; 147 (38.1 overs) | v | India; 149/1 (29.4 overs) |
| Hasini Perera 30 (46); Sneh Rana 3/31 (8 overs) | | Pratika Rawal 50* (62); Inoka Ranaweera 1/32 (7.4 overs) |

India won by 9 wickets
R. Premadasa Stadium, Colombo
Umpires: Anna Harris (Eng) and Nimali Perera (SL)
Player of the match: Pratika Rawal (Ind)

- India won the toss and elected to field.
- The match was reduced to 39 overs per side due to rain and wet outfield.
- Malki Madara, Piumi Wathsala (SL), Shree Charani and Kashvee Gautam (Ind) all made their ODI debuts.

29 April 2025
10:00
Scorecard

| India; 276/6 (50 overs) | v | South Africa; 261 (49.2 overs) |
| Pratika Rawal 78 (91); Nonkululeko Mlaba 2/55 (10 overs) | | Tazmin Brits 109 (107); Sneh Rana 5/43 (10 overs) |

India won by 15 runs
R. Premadasa Stadium, Colombo
Umpires: Anna Harris (Eng) and Dedunu Silva (SL)
Player of the match: Sneh Rana (Ind)

- India won the toss and elected to bat.
- Karabo Meso (SA) made her ODI debut.
- Sneh Rana (Ind) took her first five-wicket haul in ODIs.

4 May 2025
10:00
Scorecard

| India; 275/9 (50 overs) | v | Sri Lanka; 278/7 (49.1 overs) |
| Richa Ghosh 58 (48); Chamari Athapaththu 3/43 (10 overs) | | Nilakshi de Silva 56 (33); Sneh Rana 3/45 (10 overs) |

Sri Lanka won by 3 wickets
R. Premadasa Stadium, Colombo
Umpires: Anna Harris (Eng) and Dedunu Silva (SL)
Player of the match: Nilakshi de Silva (SL)

- Sri Lanka won the toss and elected to field.
- Smriti Mandhana (Ind) played in her 100th ODI match.
- This was the highest match aggregate (553) involving India and Sri Lanka in women's ODIs.

7 May 2025
10:00
Scorecard

| India; 337/9 (50 overs) | v | South Africa; 314/7 (50 overs) |
| Jemimah Rodrigues 123 (101); Nadine de Klerk 2/54 (9 overs) | | Annerie Dercksen 81 (80); Amanjot Kaur 3/59 (9 overs) |

India won by 23 runs
R. Premadasa Stadium, Colombo
Umpires: Anna Harris (Eng) and Nimali Perera (SL)
Player of the match: Jemimah Rodrigues (Ind)

- South Africa won the toss and elected to field.
- Shuchi Upadhyay (Ind) and Miané Smit (SA) both made their ODI debuts.
- Deepti Sharma and Jemimah Rodrigues's 122 run partnership became India's highest for the 5th wicket in women's ODIs, breaking the record of 108 between Mithali Raj and Veda Krishnamurthy in 2017.
- This was the highest match aggregate (651) involving India and South Africa in women's ODIs.

==== Final ====
11 May 2025
10:00
Scorecard

| India; 342/7 (50 overs) | v | Sri Lanka; 245 (48.2 overs) |
| Smriti Mandhana 116 (101); Sugandika Kumari 2/59 (10 overs) | | Chamari Athapaththu 51 (66); Sneh Rana 4/38 (9.2 overs) |

India won by 97 runs
R. Premadasa Stadium, Colombo
Umpires: Anna Harris (Eng) and Nimali Perera (SL)
Player of the match: Smriti Mandhana (Ind)

- India won the toss and elected to bat.
- Kranti Goud (Ind) made her ODI debut.

=== Bengal Pro T20 League ===
The 2025 Bengal Pro T20 League was held from 11 to 28 June 2025, consisting of eight teams playing in both men's and women's events respectively. The Players' Draft was held at 19 May 2025. Adamas Howrah Warriors won their maiden men's event title whereas the Lux Shyam Kolkata Tigers won the women's event title for the consecutive second time.

=== Anderson Tendulkar Trophy ===
The India cricket team toured England from June to August 2025 to play the England cricket team. The tour consisted of five Test matches. The series formed part of the 2025–2027 ICC World Test Championship. The Tendulkar-Anderson Trophy is awarded to the winner of the series. The trophy honours Sachin Tendulkar and James Anderson. The series was ended in 2-2, with both sides sharing the trophy and receiving the Pataudi medal of excellence.

==== 1st Test ====
20–24 June 2025
Scorecard

| India | v | England |
| 471 (113 overs); Shubman Gill 147 (227); Ben Stokes 4/66 (20 overs) | | 465 (100.4 overs); Ollie Pope 106 (137); Jasprit Bumrah 5/83 (24.4 overs) |
| 364 (96 overs); KL Rahul 137 (247); Josh Tongue 3/72 (18 overs) | | 373/5 (82 overs); Ben Duckett 149 (170); Shardul Thakur 2/51 (10 overs) |

England won by 5 wickets
Headingley, Leeds
Umpires: Chris Gaffaney (NZ) and Paul Reiffel (Aus)
Player of the match: Ben Duckett (Eng)

- England won the toss and elected to field.
- Sai Sudharsan (Ind) made his Test debut.
- Shubman Gill captained India for the first time in Tests.
- Shubman Gill (Ind) scored his 2,000th run in Tests.
- Rishabh Pant (Ind) scored his 3,000th run in Tests, becoming the leading Asian wicketkeeper in SENA countries and the Indian wicketkeeper with the most Test centuries (7), both surpassing MS Dhoni and most sixes (62) by an Indian in the WTC, surpassing Rohit Sharma.
- Jasprit Bumrah (Ind) held the record for the highest number of Test wickets in SENA nations by any Asian bowler and equalled Kapil Dev’s away five-wicket haul tally.
- Chris Woakes (Eng) scored his 2,000th run in Tests.
- KL Rahul (Ind) completed 1,000 Test runs against England matched the second-most fifty-plus scores by an Indian opener in SENA Tests.
- Rishabh Pant became the first Indian wicketkeeper to score centuries in both innings of a Test.
- Five centuries were scored by Indian batsmen for the first time in a single Test. It was also the first occurrence of the losing team scoring five centuries in a Test.
- Ben Stokes (Eng) became the third England captain to claim 50 wickets in Test cricket .
- World Test Championship Points: England 12, India 0.

==== 2nd Test ====
2–6 July 2025
Scorecard

| India | v | England |
| 587 (151 overs); Shubman Gill 269 (387); Shoaib Bashir 3/167 (45 overs) | | 407 (89.3 overs); Jamie Smith 184* (207); Mohammed Siraj 6/70 (19.3 overs) |
| 427/6d (83 overs); Shubman Gill 161 (162); Josh Tongue 2/93 (15 overs) | | 271 (68.1 overs); Jamie Smith 88 (99); Akash Deep 6/99 (21.1 overs) |

India won by 336 runs
Edgbaston, Birmingham
Umpires: Chris Gaffaney (NZ) and Sharfuddoula (Ban)
Player of the match: Shubman Gill (Ind)

- England won the toss and elected to field.
- Shubman Gill (Ind) scored his maiden double century in Tests. He also broke Virat Kohli's (254) record of highest individual score by an Indian captain in Tests. This score combined with his century in the second innings made the second-highest aggregate score ever.
- Ravindra Jadeja became the first-ever player to score 2,000 runs and take 100 wickets in WTC history.
- Jamie Smith (Eng) broke Alec Stewart's record (173) for the highest score by an English wicket-keeper.
- Yashasvi Jaiswal (Ind) scored his 2,000th run in Tests.
- Akash Deep (Ind) took his first five-wicket haul and ten-wicket haul in Tests.
- This was India's first ever Test win at this venue. It also became the first Asian team to win at this venue.
- This was also India's biggest Test victory by margin of runs away from home.
- World Test Championship Points: India 12, England 0.

==== 3rd Test ====
10–14 July 2025
Scorecard

| England | v | India |
| 387 (112.3 overs); Joe Root 104 (199); Jasprit Bumrah 5/74 (27 overs) | | 387 (119.2 overs); KL Rahul 100 (177); Chris Woakes 3/84 (27 overs) |
| 192 (62.1 overs); Joe Root 40 (96); Washington Sundar 4/22 (12.1 overs) | | 170 (74.5 overs); Ravindra Jadeja 61* (181); Ben Stokes 3/48 (24 overs) |

England won by 22 runs
Lord's, London
Umpires: Paul Reiffel (Aus) and Sharfuddoula (Ban)
Player of the match: Ben Stokes (Eng)

- England won the toss and elected to bat.
- Joe Root (Eng) became the first ever cricketer to complete 3,000 Test runs against India.
- Jamie Smith (Eng) became the joint-fastest wicket-keeper-batter to complete 1,000 runs in Tests.
- World Test Championship Points: England 10, India 0. (Note: England were deducted a total of 2 points for maintaining a slow over-rate.)

==== 4th Test ====
23–27 July 2025
Scorecard

| India | v | England |
| 358 (114.1 overs); Sai Sudharsan 61 (151); Ben Stokes 5/72 (24 overs) | | 669 (157.1 overs); Joe Root 150 (248); Ravindra Jadeja 4/143 (37.1 overs) |
| 425/4 (143 overs); Ravindra Jadeja 107* (185); Chris Woakes 2/67 (23 overs) |

Match drawn
Old Trafford, Manchester
Umpires: Ahsan Raza (Pak) and Rod Tucker (Aus)
Player of the match: Ben Stokes (Eng)

- England won the toss and elected to field.
- Anshul Kamboj (Ind) made his Test debut.
- Yashasvi Jaiswal (Ind) completed 1,000 Test runs against England.
- KL Rahul, Rishabh Pant and Ravindra Jadeja (Ind) all crossed 1,000 runs in England in Tests. Thus, Pant also became the first ever visiting wicket-keeper to do so in England.
- Joe Root (Eng) surpassed Ricky Ponting (Aus) to become the second highest run-scorer of all time in Tests.
- Jasprit Bumrah (Ind) took his 50th wicket in England.
- Ben Stokes (Eng) became the first English captain to score a century and take a five-wicket haul in the same Test match. He also scored his 7,000th run in Tests.
- This was England's highest total at this venue.
- Shubman Gill (Ind) surpassed Virat Kohli's (692) record of scoring most runs by an Asian batter in a Test series played in SENA countries.
- Washington Sundar (Ind) scored his maiden century in Tests.
- World Test Championship Points: England 4, India 4.

==== 5th Test ====
31 July – 4 August 2025
Scorecard

| India | v | England |
| 224 (69.4 overs); Karun Nair 57 (109); Gus Atkinson 5/33 (21.4 overs) | | 247 (51.2 overs); Zak Crawley 64 (57); Prasidh Krishna 4/62 (16 overs) |
| 396 (88 overs); Yashasvi Jaiswal 118 (164); Josh Tongue 5/125 (30 overs) | | 367 (85.1 overs); Harry Brook 111 (98); Mohammed Siraj 5/104 (30.1 overs) |

India won by 6 runs
The Oval, London
Umpires: Kumar Dharmasena (SL) and Ahsan Raza (Pak)
Player of the match: Mohammed Siraj (Ind)

- England won the toss and elected to field.
- This was India's lowest Test victory by margin of runs.
- World Test Championship Points: India 12, England 0.

=== India Women's tour of England ===
The India women's cricket team toured England in June and July 2025 to play the England women's cricket team. The tour consisted of three One Day International (ODI) and five Twenty20 International (T20I) matches. The series ran alongside the men's series between England and India.

India won the T20I series by 3–2, with the Women in Blue again dominating England with their ODI series victory by 2–1.

==== 1st T20I ====
28 June 2025
14:30
Scorecard

| India; 210/5 (20 overs) | v | England; 113 (14.5 overs) |
| Smriti Mandhana 112 (62); Lauren Bell 3/27 (4 overs) | | Nat Sciver-Brunt 66 (42); Shree Charani 4/12 (3.5 overs) |

India won by 97 runs
Trent Bridge, Nottingham
Umpires: James Middlebrook (Eng) and Jacqueline Williams (WI)
Player of the match: Smriti Mandhana (Ind)

- England won the toss and elected to field.
- Shree Charani (Ind) made her T20I debut.
- Harleen Deol (Ind) scored her 1,000th run in international cricket.
- Lauren Bell (Eng) took her 100th wicket in international cricket.
- Smriti Mandhana and Shafali Verma (Ind) recorded the most fifty-plus partnerships (21) in women's T20Is and breaking the record of Australia's Alyssa Healy and Beth Mooney (20).
- Smriti Mandhana became the first Indian woman cricketer to score centuries in all three formats. She recorded the highest score by an Indian woman in T20Is, and recorded the most boundary runs in a T20I innings for India with 78, both surpassing Harmanpreet Kaur in 2018.

==== 2nd T20I ====
1 July 2025
18:30 (N)
Scorecard

| India; 181/4 (20 overs) | v | England; 157/7 (20 overs) |
| Amanjot Kaur 63* (40); Lauren Bell 2/17 (4 overs) | | Tammy Beaumont 54 (35); Shree Charani 2/28 (4 overs) |

India won by 24 runs
County Cricket Ground, Bristol
Umpires: Anna Harris (Eng) and James Middlebrook (Eng)
Player of the match: Amanjot Kaur (Ind)

- England won the toss and elected to field.
- Smriti Mandhana became the second Indian woman cricketer to play 150 T20I matches.
- Smriti Mandhana and Shafali Verma (Ind) recorded the most runs (2,724) as a pair in women's T20Is, going past the Australia's Beth Mooney and Alyssa Healy (2,720).
- Richa Ghosh (Ind) scored her 1,000th run in T20Is.
- Tammy Beaumont (Eng) scored her 7,000th run in international cricket.

==== 3rd T20I ====
4 July 2025
18:35 (N)
Scorecard

| England; 171/9 (20 overs) | v | India; 166/5 (20 overs) |
| Sophia Dunkley 75 (53); Deepti Sharma 3/27 (4 overs) | | Smriti Mandhana 56 (49); Lauren Filer 2/30 (4 overs) |

England won by 5 runs
The Oval, London
Umpires: Sue Redfern (Eng) and Jacqueline Williams (WI)
Player of the match: Sophia Dunkley (Eng)

- England won the toss and elected to bat.
- Tammy Beaumont (Eng) captained England for the first time in T20Is.
- Radha Yadav (Ind) took her 100th wicket in T20Is.
- Deepti Sharma (Ind) became the joint-second highest wicket taker (144) in women's T20Is.
- Smriti Mandhana (Ind) scored her 9,000th run in international cricket.

==== 4th T20I ====
9 July 2025
18:30 (N)
Scorecard

| England; 126/7 (20 overs) | v | India; 127/4 (17 overs) |
| Sophia Dunkley 22 (19); Radha Yadav 2/15 (4 overs) | | Smriti Mandhana 32 (31); Issy Wong 1/18 (3 overs) |

India won by 6 wickets
Old Trafford, Manchester
Umpires: Ian Blackwell (Eng) and Anna Harris (Eng)
Player of the match: Radha Yadav (Ind)

- England won the toss and elected to bat.
- Sophie Ecclestone (Eng) played in her 100th T20I match.
- Deepti Sharma (Ind) took her 300th wicket in international cricket. She took second highest wickets and took highest wickets among spinners surpassing Nida Dar in T20Is (145).
- Sophie Ecclestone (Eng) took her 300th wicket in international cricket.

==== 5th T20I ====
12 July 2025
18:35 (N)
Scorecard

| India; 167/7 (20 overs) | v | England; 168/5 (20 overs) |
| Shafali Verma 75 (41); Charlie Dean 3/23 (4 overs) | | Danni Wyatt-Hodge 56 (37); Deepti Sharma 2/31 (4 overs) |

England won by 5 wickets
Edgbaston, Birmingham
Umpires: Ian Blackwell (Eng) and Jacqueline Williams (WI)
Player of the match: Charlie Dean (Eng)

- England won the toss and elected to field.
- Kranti Goud (Ind) made her T20I debut.
- Danni Wyatt-Hodge became the second English woman cricketer to play 300 international matches.
- Richa Ghosh (Ind) scored her 2,000th run in international cricket.

==== 1st ODI ====
16 July 2025
13:00 (D/N)
Scorecard

| England; 258/6 (50 overs) | v | India; 262/6 (48.2 overs) |
| Sophia Dunkley 83 (92); Sneh Rana 2/31 (10 overs) | | Deepti Sharma 62* (64); Charlie Dean 2/52 (10 overs) |

India won by 4 wickets
Rose Bowl, Southampton
Umpires: Sue Redfern (Eng) and Jacqueline Williams (WI)
Player of the match: Deepti Sharma (Ind)

- England won the toss and elected to bat.
- Nat Sciver-Brunt (Eng) crossed 2,000 runs in England in ODIs.
- Smriti Mandhana and Pratika Rawal (Ind) scored 1,000th run as a pair in women's ODIs.
- This was India's second-highest successful run chase in women's ODIs.

==== 2nd ODI ====
19 July 2025
11:00
Scorecard

| India; 143/8 (29 overs) | v | England; 116/2 (21 overs) |
| Smriti Mandhana 42 (51); Sophie Ecclestone 3/27 (6 overs) | | Amy Jones 46* (57); Sneh Rana 1/12 (3 overs) |

England won by 8 wickets (DLS method)
Lord's, London
Umpires: Anna Harris (Eng) and Rob White (Eng)
Player of the match: Sophie Ecclestone (Eng)

- England won the toss and elected to field.
- The match was reduced to 29 overs per side due to rain.
- England were set a revised target of 115 runs from 24 overs due to rain.

==== 3rd ODI ====
22 July 2025
13:00 (D/N)
Scorecard

| India; 318/5 (50 overs) | v | England; 305 (49.5 overs) |
| Harmanpreet Kaur 102 (84); Sophie Ecclestone 1/28 (10 overs) | | Nat Sciver-Brunt 98 (105); Kranti Goud 6/52 (9.5 overs) |

India won by 13 runs
Riverside Ground, Chester-le-Street
Umpires: Rob White (Eng) and Jacqueline Williams (WI)
Player of the match: Harmanpreet Kaur (Ind)

- India won the toss and elected to bat.
- Jemimah Rodrigues (Ind) played in her 50th ODI match.
- Harmanpreet Kaur (Ind) scored her 4,000th run, and became the second Indian woman to cross 1,000 runs in England in ODIs.
- Jemimah Rodrigues (Ind) scored her 4,000th run in international cricket.
- Nat Sciver-Brunt (Eng) scored her 4,000th run in ODIs.
- Kranti Goud (Ind) took her maiden five-wicket haul in ODIs.

=== Delhi Premier League T20 ===
The 2025 season of the Delhi Premier League T20 (DPLT20) is scheduled to take place from 2 August to 31 August 2025. It consists of 8 men's and 4 women's teams respectively, with all matches hosted at the Arun Jaitley Stadium in New Delhi.

=== Andhra Premier League ===
The 2025 Andhra Premier League will be held from 8 to 23 August 2025, consisting seven teams representing parts of Andhra Pradesh. Andhra Pradesh High Court stays Andhra Premier League 2025 franchise auctions until further orders. Major relief for existing team owners challenging Andhra Cricket Association's unilateral and misleading auction process.

== Darts ==
=== World Darts Championship ===
India's Nitin Kumar competed in the 2025 PDC World Darts Championship, held in London, England from 15 December 2024 to 3 January 2025 after qualifying for the tournament through nation qualifier. Kumar lost to Martin Lukeman by 1-3 and was eliminated in the first round of the tournament.

== Field Hockey ==
=== 2025 Men's Hockey Asia Cup ===
The 2025 edition of the Men's Hockey Asia Cup is being held at the Bihar Sports University Hockey Stadium in Rajgir Sports Complex, Bihar, India from 29 August to 7 September 2025. India won their fourth Asia Cup title, defeating South Korea in the final and qualified for the 2026 Men's FIH Hockey World Cup.

==== Group Stage ====
| Pos | Team | Pld | W | D | L | GF | GA | GD | Pts | Qualification |
|---|---|---|---|---|---|---|---|---|---|---|
| 1 | India (H) | 3 | 3 | 0 | 0 | 22 | 5 | +17 | 9 | Super4s |
| 2 | China | 3 | 1 | 1 | 1 | 18 | 7 | +11 | 4 | Super4s |
| 3 | Japan | 3 | 1 | 1 | 1 | 11 | 5 | +6 | 4 | |
| 4 | Kazakhstan | 3 | 0 | 0 | 3 | 1 | 35 | −34 | 0 | |

Source: FIH
Rules for classification: 1) points; 2) matches won; 3) goal difference; 4) goals for; 5) head-to-head result; 6) field goals for.
(H) Hosts

29 August 2025
15:00

| India | 4–3 | China |
|---|---|---|
| Jugraj 18'; Harmanpreet 20', 33', 47' | Report | Du 12'; Chen B. 35'; Gao 41' |

Umpires:
Rawi Anbananthan (MAS)
You Hyo-sik (KOR)

31 August 2025
15:00

| Japan | 2–3 | India |
|---|---|---|
| Kawabe 38', 59' | Report | Mandeep 4'; Harmanpreet 5', 46' |

Umpires:
Michiel Otten (NED)
Rawi Anbananthan (MAS)

1 September 2025
19:30

| India | 15–0 | Kazakhstan |
|---|---|---|
| Abhishek 5', 8', 20', 59'; Sukhjeet 15', 32', 38'; Jugraj 24', 31', 47'; Harmanpreet 26'; Amit 29'; Rajinder 32'; Sanjay 54'; Dilpreet 55' | Report |

Umpires:
Zhou Fuyi (CHN)
Khamis Al-Balushi (OMA)

==== Super 4s ====
In the first match, India drew with South Korea by 2-2. In the second match, India defeated Malaysia comfortably by 4–1. In the third match, India thrashed China again, this time with a one-sided victory by 7–0, and qualified for the final.

| Pos | Team | Pld | W | D | L | GF | GA | GD | Pts | Qualification |
|---|---|---|---|---|---|---|---|---|---|---|
| 1 | India (H) | 3 | 2 | 1 | 0 | 13 | 3 | +10 | 7 | Final |
| 2 | South Korea | 3 | 1 | 1 | 1 | 6 | 8 | −2 | 4 | Final |
| 3 | Malaysia | 3 | 1 | 0 | 2 | 6 | 8 | −2 | 3 | Third place match |
| 4 | China | 3 | 1 | 0 | 2 | 3 | 9 | −6 | 3 | Third place match |

Source: FIH
Rules for classification: 1) points; 2) matches won; 3) goal difference; 4) goals for; 5) head-to-head result; 6) field goals scored.
(H) Hosts

3 September 2025
19:30

| India | 2–2 | South Korea |
|---|---|---|
| Hardik 8'; Mandeep 53' | Report | Yang 12'; Kim H-h 14' |

Umpires:
Tyler Klenk (CAN)
Khamis Al-Balushi (OMA)

4 September 2025
19:30

| Malaysia | 1–4 | India |
|---|---|---|
| Hassan 2' | Report | Manpreet 17'; Sukhjeet 19'; Lakra 24'; Prasad 38' |

Umpires:
Michiel Otten (NED)
You Hyo-sik (KOR)

6 September 2025
19:30

| India | 7–0 | China |
|---|---|---|
| Lakra 4'; Dilpreet 7'; Mandeep 18'; Pal 37'; Sukhjeet 39'; Abhishek 46', 50' | Report |

Umpires:
Hideki Kinoshita (JPN)
Tyler Klenk (CAN)

==== Final ====
This was the fourth encounter between the teams in the Asia Cup finals, after 1994, 2007 and 2013 edition respectively. India leads in the head-to-head record against South Korea in Asia Cup history by 6-3 (with 4 matches being drawn).

7 September 2025
19:30

| India | 4–1 | South Korea |
|---|---|---|
| Sukhjeet 1'; Dilpreet 28', 45'; Amit 50' | Report | Son 51' |

Umpires:
Rawi Anbananthan (MAS)
Michiel Otten (NED)

=== 2025 Women's Hockey Asia Cup ===
The 2025 edition of the Women's Hockey Asia Cup is being held at Gongshu Canal Sports Park Hockey Field in Hangzhou, China, from 5 to 14 September 2025.

==== Group Stage ====
| Pos | Team | Pld | W | D | L | GF | GA | GD | Pts | Qualification |
|---|---|---|---|---|---|---|---|---|---|---|
| 1 | India | 3 | 2 | 1 | 0 | 25 | 2 | +23 | 7 | Super4s |
| 2 | Japan | 3 | 2 | 1 | 0 | 17 | 2 | +15 | 7 | Super4s |
| 3 | Thailand | 3 | 1 | 0 | 2 | 2 | 18 | −16 | 3 | |
| 4 | Singapore | 3 | 0 | 0 | 3 | 1 | 23 | −22 | 0 | |

Source: FIH
Rules for classification: 1) points; 2) matches won; 3) goal difference; 4) goals for; 5) head-to-head result; 6) field goals scored.

5 September 2025
14:30

| India | 11–0 | Thailand |
|---|---|---|
| Mumtaz 7', 49'; Sangita 10'; Navneet 16'; Lalremsiami 18'; Udita 30+', 52'; Beauty 45', 54'; Sharmila 57'; Rutuja 60' | Report |

Umpires:
Kim Yoon-seon (KOR)
Li Lulu (CHN)

6 September 2025
19:00

| Japan | 2–2 | India |
|---|---|---|
| Murayama 10'; Fujibayashi 58' | Report | Rutuja 30'; Navneet 60+' |

Umpires:
Liu Xiaoying (CHN)
Meghan McLennan (CAN)

8 September 2025
14:30

| India | 12–0 | Singapore |
|---|---|---|
| Mumtaz 2', 32', 39'; Neha 11', 38'; Lalremsiami 13'; Navneet 14', 20', 28'; Udita 29'; Sharmila 45'; Rutuja 53' | Report |

Umpires:
Li Lulu (CHN)
Shahiela Johari (MAS)

== Football ==
=== I-League ===
The 2024–25 I-League was the 18th season of the I-League and the third season as the second tier of the Indian football league system. Mohammedan were the reigning champions, having won the 2023–24 I-League. Churchill Brothers were initially declared the provisional champions of I-League by AIFF, but the decision was later overturned by the Court of Arbitration for Sport (CAS) who declared Inter Kashi the champions, allowing them promotion to the Indian Super League.

==== League table ====
| Pos | Team | Pld | W | D | L | GF | GA | GD | Pts | Promotion or relegation |
|---|---|---|---|---|---|---|---|---|---|---|
| 1 | Inter Kashi (C, P) | 22 | 12 | 6 | 4 | 42 | 31 | +11 | 42 (Note: Inter Kashi was awarded and then stripped of points in multiple rulings. The Court of Arbitration for Sport ultimately ruled in their favor, restoring four deducted points.) | Promotion to ISL and qualification for Super Cup (April) and (October) |
| 2 | Churchill Brothers | 22 | 11 | 7 | 4 | 45 | 25 | +20 | 40 (Note: Churchill Brothers were deducted one point and awarded two, which were later revoked by the Court of Arbitration for Sport. Churchill Brothers challenged this decision in Federal Supreme Court of Switzerland, which was dismissed, preventing further changes in points table.) | |
| 3 | Real Kashmir | 22 | 10 | 7 | 5 | 31 | 25 | +6 | 37 (Note: The forfeit win originally awarded to Real Kashmir was revoked by CAS in favor of Inter Kashi.) | |
| 4 | Gokulam Kerala | 22 | 11 | 4 | 7 | 45 | 29 | +16 | 37 (Note: Head-to-head: Real Kashmir 4, Gokulam Kerala 1) | Qualification for Super Cup (April) and (October) |
| 5 | Rajasthan United | 22 | 9 | 6 | 7 | 34 | 33 | +1 | 33 | Qualification for Super Cup (October) |
| 6 | Dempo | 22 | 8 | 5 | 9 | 35 | 33 | +2 | 29 (Note: Head-to-head: Dempo 4, Namdhari 1) | Qualification for Super Cup (October) |
| 7 | Namdhari | 22 | 8 | 5 | 9 | 28 | 30 | −2 | 29 (Note: Namdhari was deducted three points for fielding an ineligible player, then awarded three in another ruling, which was also later overturned.) | |
| 8 | Shillong Lajong | 22 | 7 | 7 | 8 | 46 | 45 | +1 | 28 | |
| 9 | Sreenidi Deccan | 22 | 7 | 7 | 8 | 34 | 37 | −3 | 28 | |
| 10 | Aizawl | 22 | 6 | 5 | 11 | 35 | 46 | −11 | 23 (Note: Aizawl was awarded two points after Churchill Brothers fielded an ineligible player.) | |
| 11 | Sporting Bengaluru (R) | 22 | 5 | 6 | 11 | 24 | 42 | −18 | 21 | Relegation to I-League 2 |
| 12 | Delhi (R) | 22 | 3 | 5 | 14 | 21 | 44 | −23 | 14 | Relegation to I-League 2 |

Source: I-League
Rules for classification: 1) Points; 2) Head-to-head points; 3) Head-to-head goal difference; 4) Total goal difference; 5) Total goals scored; 6) Drawing of lots
(Note: Head-to-head applies only after all relevant matches are played)
(C) Champions; (P) Promoted; (R) Relegated

==== League fixtures ====
| Home \ Away | AIZ | CHB | DEL | DEM | GOK | IKA | NAM | RAJ | REK | SHL | SCB | SRD |
|---|---|---|---|---|---|---|---|---|---|---|---|---|
| Aizawl | — | 3–0 (Note: Churchill Brothers were deducted one point and three points given to Aizawl for fielding an ineligible player. Initially the match was drawn 1–1.) | 4–2 | 0–0 | 1–2 | 0–3 | 3–0 | 1–2 | 1–1 | 1–3 | 2–0 | 3–4 |
| Churchill Brothers | 6–0 | — | 2–2 | 2–0 | 2–1 | 2–2 (Note: Inter Kashi were deducted one point and two points were given to Churchill Brothers, after Inter Kashi fielded an ineligible player. Initially the match was drawn by 2–2. On 18 July 2025, the Court of Arbitration for Sport revoked the two points previously awarded to Churchill Brothers from Inter Kashi match.) | 0–1 | 3–1 | 3–1 | 6–1 | 1–1 | 1–1 |
| Delhi | 0–2 | 1–2 | — | 2–1 | 0–5 | 0–1 | 0–2 | 1–1 | 1–2 | 3–1 | 0–1 | 0–1 |
| Dempo | 5–2 | 1–3 | 1–0 | — | 0–1 | 0–1 | 2–2 | 0–4 | 1–1 | 2–2 | 8–1 | 2–3 |
| Gokulam Kerala | 1–1 | 0–1 | 6–3 | 3–4 | — | 6–2 | 0–2 | 0–0 | 0–1 | 3–4 | 2–0 | 1–0 |
| Inter Kashi | 4–3 | 1–3 | 5–1 | 0–2 | 3–2 | — | 3–2 (Note: Inter Kashi were deducted three points and given to Namdhari for fielding an ineligible player. Initially Inter Kashi won the match by 3-2. On 18 July 2025, the Court of Arbitration for Sport ruled in favour of Inter Kashi, revoked the three points previously awarded to Namdhari in the return leg.) | 3–1 | 1–3 (Note: The match was forfeited in favour of Real Kashmir as Inter Kashi fielded an ineligible player. Initially Real Kashmir already won the match by 1-3. On 18 July 2025, the Court of Arbitration for Sport ruled in favour of Inter Kashi, revoked the forfeiture previously awarded to Real Kashmir.) | 2–1 | 1–0 | 3–1 |
| Namdhari | 3–1 | 1–1 | 0–0 | 0–1 | 1–3 | 0–3 (Note: Namdhari were deducted three points and given to Inter Kashi for fielding an ineligible player in Match 45. Initially Namdhari won the match by 2–0. However, later AIFF Appeal Committee reverted the decision later that was again reverted in favour of Inter Kashi by an appeal to Court of Arbitration of Sports.) | — | 1–3 | 1–0 | 5–2 | 2–1 | 1–1 |
| Rajasthan United | 0–0 | 1–0 | 3–1 | 1–1 | 0–3 | 1–1 | 2–1 | — | 4–0 | 4–0 | 2–1 | 1–2 |
| Real Kashmir | 2–1 | 1–1 | 2–1 | 2–0 | 1–1 | 1–1 | 1–0 | 2–0 | — | 2–0 | 3–1 | 2–2 |
| Shillong Lajong | 4–4 | 2–2 | 0–0 | 0–2 | 0–0 | 0–0 | 3–2 | 8–0 | 1–0 | — | 5–0 | 4–0 |
| Sporting Bengaluru | 1–2 | 1–3 | 2–2 | 3–1 | 1–2 | 0–0 | 0–0 | 2–2 | 3–2 | 2–0 | — | 1–0 |
| Sreenidi Deccan | 3–0 | 2–1 | 0–1 | 0–1 | 2–3 | 2–2 | 0–1 | 2–1 | 1–1 | 5–5 | 2–2 | — |

Source: I-League
Legend: Blue = home team win; Yellow = draw; Red = away team win.

=== I-League 2 ===
The 2024–25 I-League 2 was the 17th season of the I-League 2, held from 25 January to 26 April 2025. It was also the 3rd season as the third tier of the Indian football league system. The top two clubs secured a place in the 2025–26 I-League season. In October 2024, Sudeva Delhi withdrew from the tournament. This brought the total number of teams participating in the league to nine. Diamond Harbour FC won the league and was promoted, along with Chanmari FC to the 2025–26 I-League.

==== League table ====
| Pos | Team | Pld | W | D | L | GF | GA | GD | Pts | Promotion or relegation |
|---|---|---|---|---|---|---|---|---|---|---|
| 1 | Diamond Harbour (C) | 16 | 11 | 5 | 0 | 28 | 10 | +18 | 38 | Promotion to I-League |
| 2 | Chanmari | 16 | 10 | 3 | 3 | 36 | 10 | +26 | 33 | Promotion to I-League |
| 3 | Sporting Goa | 16 | 7 | 5 | 4 | 18 | 12 | +6 | 26 | |
| 4 | Bengaluru United | 16 | 6 | 5 | 5 | 21 | 11 | +10 | 23 | |
| 5 | SAT | 16 | 6 | 4 | 6 | 21 | 23 | −2 | 22 | |
| 6 | United | 16 | 5 | 6 | 5 | 15 | 17 | −2 | 21 | |
| 7 | NEROCA | 16 | 5 | 2 | 9 | 19 | 29 | −10 | 17 | |
| 8 | TRAU | 16 | 3 | 3 | 10 | 14 | 30 | −16 | 12 | Relegation to I-League 3 |
| 9 | KLASA | 16 | 2 | 1 | 13 | 8 | 38 | −30 | 7 | Relegation to I-League 3 |

Source: I-League 2 AIFF
Rules for classification: 1) points; 2) head-to-head points; 3) head-to-head goal difference; 4) head-to-head goals scored; 5) goal difference; 6) number of goals scored; 7) fair play ranking; 8) drawing of lots
(C) Champions

==== League fixtures ====
| Home \ Away | BEN | CHN | DHB | KLA | NER | SAT | SCG | TRU | USC |
|---|---|---|---|---|---|---|---|---|---|
| Bengaluru United | — | 0–2 | 1–2 | 7–0 | 1–2 | 0–0 | 1–1 | 3–0 | 0–0 |
| Chanmari | 1–0 | — | 0–1 | 4–0 | 1–0 | 3–0 | 1–1 | 7–1 | 4–1 |
| Diamond Harbour | 0–0 | 2–0 | — | 1–0 | 1–1 | 4–1 | 2–1 | 3–1 | 0–0 |
| KLASA | 0–2 | 0–8 | 1–3 | — | 1–2 | 0–1 | 0–1 | 0–0 | 0–1 |
| NEROCA | 0–2 | 1–2 | 0–2 | 2–3 | — | 0–1 | 2–1 | 1–1 | 1–0 |
| SAT | 1–0 | 1–1 | 1–2 | 2–0 | 5–2 | — | 1–1 | 2–3 | 0–0 |
| Sporting Goa | 0–0 | 1–0 | 1–1 | 1–0 | 3–0 | 2–3 | — | 1–0 | 2–0 |
| TRAU | 1–2 | 0–1 | 0–2 | 1–3 | 1–2 | 2–1 | 0–1 | — | 2–0 |
| United | 1–2 | 1–1 | 2–2 | 2–0 | 2–1 | 3–1 | 1–0 | 1–1 | — |

Source: I-League
Legend: Blue = home team win; Yellow = draw; Red = away team win.

=== AFC Women's Asian Cup ===
In July 2025, India secured a berth at the AFC Women's Asian Cup for the first time via qualification. India defeated group qualifiers host Thailand 2–1 to earn a berth at the 2026 edition set to be hosted in Australia.

| Pos | Team | Pld | W | D | L | GF | GA | GD | Pts | Qualification |
|---|---|---|---|---|---|---|---|---|---|---|
| 1 | India | 4 | 4 | 0 | 0 | 24 | 1 | +23 | 12 | Final tournament |
| 2 | Thailand (H) | 4 | 3 | 0 | 1 | 23 | 2 | +21 | 9 | |
| 3 | Timor-Leste | 4 | 1 | 1 | 2 | 3 | 9 | −6 | 4 | |
| 4 | Iraq | 4 | 1 | 1 | 2 | 5 | 14 | −9 | 4 | |
| 5 | Mongolia | 4 | 0 | 0 | 4 | 3 | 32 | −29 | 0 | |

Source: AFC
Rules for classification: Qualification tiebreakers
(H) Hosts
23 June 2025
16:00

| Mongolia | 0–13 | India |
|---|---|---|
| | Report | Basfore 8'; Guguloth 20', 59'; Xaxa 29', 45', 46', 52', 55'; Haldar 67'; Prasad 71'; Selladurai 73', 86'; Dangmei 75' (pen.) |

700th Anniversary Stadium, Chiang Mai
Referee: Jon Sol-mi (North Korea)

29 June 2025
16:00

| India | 4–0 | Timor-Leste |
|---|---|---|
| Kalyan 12', 80'; Tamang 58'; Kom 85' | Report |

700th Anniversary Stadium, Chiang Mai
Referee: Doumouh Al-Bakkar (Lebanon)

2 July 2025
16:00

| India | 5–0 | Iraq |
|---|---|---|
| Basfore 14'; Kalyan 44'; Angamuthu 48'; Phanjoubam 64'; Nongmaithem 80' | Report |

700th Anniversary Stadium, Chiang Mai
Referee: Azusa Sugino (Japan)

5 July 2025
19:30

| Thailand | 1–2 | India |
|---|---|---|
| Chatchawan 47' | Report | Basfore 29', 74' |

700th Anniversary Stadium, Chiang Mai
Referee: Kim Yu-jeong (South Korea)

=== Durand Cup ===
The 2025 Durand Cup is the 134th edition of the Durand Cup, the oldest football tournament in Asia, and the fourth edition since the Asian Football Confederation supported it. The tournament is hosted by the Durand Football Tournament Society in co-operation with the AIFF, Eastern Command of the Indian Armed Forces and the Government of West Bengal, supported by the governments of Assam, Meghalaya, Manipur and Jharkhand. Initially, Indonesian Army had assured to participate in this tournament but later on they withdrew their name and was replaced by Malaysian Army.

==== Quarter-finals ====
16 August 2025
16:00 IST
Match 37

| Shillong Lajong | 2–1 | Indian Navy |
|---|---|---|
| Lyngdoh 69' (pen.); Everbrightson 80' | Report; PDF Report | Vijay Marandi 38' |

Jawaharlal Nehru Stadium, Shillong, Meghalaya
Attendance: 8,337
Referee: Pratik Mondal
Man of the Match: Everbrightson Mylliempdah (Shillong Lajong)

16 August 2025
19:00 IST
Match 38

| Bodoland | 0–4 | NorthEast United |
|---|---|---|
| | Report; PDF Report | Ajaraie 29', 61'; Andy 53'; Parthib 90+1' |

SAI Stadium, Kokrajhar (BTR), Assam
Attendance: 14,970
Referee: Surajit Das
Man of the Match: Alaaeddine Ajaraie (NorthEast United)

17 August 2025
16:00 IST
Match 39

| Jamshedpur | 0–2 | Diamond Harbour |
|---|---|---|
| | Report; PDF Report | Sairuat Kima 3', 41' |

JRD Tata Sports Complex, Jamshedpur, Jharkhand
Attendance: 11,472
Referee: Lakshay
Man of the Match: Sairuat Kima (Diamond Harbour)

17 August 2025
19:00 IST
Match 40

| East Bengal | 2–1 | Mohun Bagan |
|---|---|---|
| Diamantakos 38' (pen.), 52' | Report; PDF Report | Thapa 68' |

Vivekananda Yuba Bharati Krirangan, Kolkata, West Bengal
Attendance: 58,676
Referee: Venkatesh Ramachandran
Man of the Match: Dimitrios Diamantakos (East Bengal)

==== Semi-finals ====
19 August 2025
19:00 IST
Match 41

| Shillong Lajong | 0–1 | NorthEast United |
|---|---|---|
| | Report; PDF Report | Tlang 36' |

Jawaharlal Nehru Stadium, Shillong, Meghalaya
Attendance: 14,911
Referee: Senthil Nathan (sub. Lalit Singh Rawat)
Man of the Match: Redeem Tlang (NorthEast United)

20 August 2025
19:00 IST
Match 42

| Diamond Harbour | 2–1 | East Bengal |
|---|---|---|
| Kortazar 66'; Justin 83' | Report; PDF Report | Anwar 67' |

Vivekananda Yuba Bharati Krirangan, Kolkata, West Bengal
Attendance: 18,960
Referee: Harish Kundu
Man of the Match: Mirshad Michu (Diamond Harbour)

==== Final ====
23 August 2025
17:30 IST

| NorthEast United | 6–1 | Diamond Harbour |
|---|---|---|
| Akhtar 30'; Gogoi 45+1'; Ngasepam 50'; Samperio 81'; Rodríguez 85'; Ajaraie 90+3' (pen.) | Report; PDF | Majcen 68' |

Vivekananda Yuba Bharati Krirangan, Kolkata, West Bengal
Attendance: 16,920

=== 2025 CAFA Nations Cup ===
India is participating in the 2025 edition of the CAFA Nations Cup, a biennial international men's football championship of Central Asia, being held in Tajikistan and Uzbekistan from 29 August to 8 September 2025. India received the invitation after the Malaysian team withdrew from the competition. This will be India's first tournament under the new coach Khalid Jamil. In first round, India defeated a higher ranked Tajikistan by 2–1.

==== Group Stage (Group B) ====
| Pos | Team | Pld | W | D | L | GF | GA | GD | Pts | Qualification |
|---|---|---|---|---|---|---|---|---|---|---|
| 1 | Iran | 3 | 2 | 1 | 0 | 8 | 3 | +5 | 7 | Advance to final |
| 2 | India | 3 | 1 | 1 | 1 | 2 | 4 | −2 | 4 (Note: Head-to-head points: India 3, Tajikistan 0.) | Advance to third place match |
| 3 | Tajikistan (H) | 3 | 1 | 1 | 1 | 5 | 4 | +1 | 4 | |
| 4 | Afghanistan | 3 | 0 | 1 | 2 | 1 | 5 | −4 | 1 | |

Source: Soccerway
Rules for classification: Tiebreakers
(H) Hosts
Notes:

29 August 2025
20:30

| Tajikistan | 1–2 | India |
|---|---|---|
| Samiev 23' | GSA Report | Anwar 5'; Jhingan 13' |

Hisor Central Stadium, Hisor
Attendance: 17,450
Referee: Firdavs Norsafarov (Uzbekistan)
Man of the Match: Sandesh Jhingan (India)

1 September 2025
17:00

| India | 0–3 | Iran |
|---|---|---|
| | GSA Report | Hosseinzadeh 59'; Alipour 89'; Taremi 90+6' |

Hisor Central Stadium, Hisor
Attendance: 1,050
Referee: Ilgiz Tantashev (Uzbekistan)
Man of the Match: Amirhossein Hosseinzadeh (Iran)

4 September 2025
17:00

| Afghanistan | 0–0 | India |
|---|---|---|
| | GSA Report |

Hisor Central Stadium, Hisor
Attendance: 1,100
Referee: Nurzatbek Abdıkadırov (Kyrgyzstan)
Man of the Match: Anwar Ali (India)

==== Third place match ====
8 September 2025
17:00

| India | 1–1 (a.e.t.) | Oman |
|---|---|---|
| Kumam 80' | GSA Report | Al-Yahmadi 55' |
Penalties
| Chhangte (penalty scored); Bheke (penalty scored); Ali (penalty missed); Jithin (penalty scored); Kumam (penalty missed) | 3–2 | (penalty missed) Al-Saadi; (penalty missed) Al-Kaabi; (penalty scored) Al-Rushaidi; (penalty scored) Al-Ghassani; (penalty missed) Al-Yahmadi |

Hisor Central Stadium, Hisor
Referee: Firdavs Norsafarov (Uzbekistan)
Man of the Match: Gurpreet Singh Sandhu (India)

=== AFC Champions League Two ===
The 2025–26 AFC Champions League Two is the 22nd edition of Asia's second-tier club football tournament, organised by the Asian Football Confederation (AFC), and the second under the AFC Champions League Two title. Mohun Bagan qualified directly for the group stage of West Region as the 2024–25 Indian Super League champions, while FC Goa qualified for the qualifying playoff for the West Region as they were the 2025 Indian Super Cup April edition winners. Goa qualified for the group stages after defeating Oman's Al-Seeb.

==== Qualifying play-offs ====
13 August 2025
19:30 IST
Preliminary stage

| Goa (All India Football Federation) | 2–1 | (Oman Football Association) Al-Seeb |
|---|---|---|
| Dražić 24'; Siverio 52' | Report | Nasser 60' |

Jawaharlal Nehru Stadium, Goa, India
Attendance: 12,314
Referee: Zhang Lei (China)

==== Group C ====
| Pos | Team | Pld | W | D | L | GF | GA | GD | Pts | Qualification | ALH | SEP | AHA | MBG |
|---|---|---|---|---|---|---|---|---|---|---|---|---|---|---|
| 1 | (Jordan) Al-Hussein | 4 | 3 | 0 | 1 | 8 | 4 | +4 | 9 | Advance to round of 16 | — | 1–0 | 3–1 | ~~21 Oct~~ |
| 2 | (Iran) Sepahan | 4 | 2 | 1 | 1 | 5 | 3 | +2 | 7 | Advance to round of 16 | 2–0 | — | 2–2 | ~~30 Sep~~ |
| 3 | (Turkmenistan) Ahal | 4 | 0 | 1 | 3 | 4 | 10 | −6 | 1 | | 1–4 | 0–1 | — | ~~25 Nov~~ |
| 4 | (India) Mohun Bagan | 0 | 0 | 0 | 0 | 0 | 0 | 0 | 0 | Withdrew (Note: On 27 September 2025, AFC announced that Mohun Bagan SG were considered to have withdrawn from the AFC Champions League Two after they failed to travel to Iran to play their fixture against Sepahan in Isfahan, citing security concerns. Their single match played, a 1–0 defeat to Ahal, was annulled and all their remaining matches were cancelled. This was the second year in a row that Mohun Bagan had been withdrawn from the competition for refusing to fulfill a fixture in Iran. In December 2025 the AFC banned them from entering the following season's AFC competitions, meaning they will not be eligible to re-enter the Champions League until the 2027–28 season) | ~~4 Nov~~ | ~~23 Dec~~ | ~~0–1~~ | — |

Source: ACL2
Rules for classification: Tiebreakers
Notes:
16 September 2025
19:15 IST
Group Stage

| Mohun Bagan (All India Football Federation) | Voided (0–1) | (Football Federation of Turkmenistan) Ahal |
|---|---|---|
| | Report | Annayev 83' |

Vivekananda Yuba Bharati Krirangan, Kolkata, India
Attendance: 41,003
Referee: Clifford Daypuyat (Philippines)
30 September 2025
21:30 IST
Group Stage

| Sepahan (Football Federation Islamic Republic of Iran) | Cancelled (Note: On 27 September 2025, AFC announced that Mohun Bagan SG were considered to have withdrawn from the AFC Champions League Two after they failed to appear for their fixture against Sepahan in Isfahan. Their single match was voided.) | (All India Football Federation) Mohun Bagan |
|---|---|---|
| | Report |

Naghsh-e-Jahan Stadium, Isfahan, Iran
21 October 2025
23:45 IST
Group Stage

| Al-Hussein (Jordan Football Association) | Cancelled | (All India Football Federation) Mohun Bagan |
|---|---|---|
| | Report |

Amman International Stadium, Amman, Jordan
4 November 2025
19:15 IST
Group Stage

| Mohun Bagan (All India Football Federation) | Cancelled | (Jordan Football Association) Al-Hussein |
|---|---|---|
| | Report |

Vivekananda Yuba Bharati Krirangan, Kolkata, India
25 November 2025
19:15 IST
Group Stage

| Ahal (Football Federation of Turkmenistan) | Cancelled | (All India Football Federation) Mohun Bagan |
|---|---|---|
| | Report |

Arkadag Stadium, Arkadag, Turkmenistan
23 December 2025
19:15 IST
Group Stage

| Mohun Bagan (All India Football Federation) | Cancelled | (Football Federation Islamic Republic of Iran) Sepahan |
|---|---|---|
| | Report |

Vivekananda Yuba Bharati Krirangan, Kolkata, India

==== Group D ====
| Pos | Team | Pld | W | D | L | GF | GA | GD | Pts | Qualification | NSR | ZWR | IST | GOA |
|---|---|---|---|---|---|---|---|---|---|---|---|---|---|---|
| 1 | (Saudi Arabia) Al-Nassr | 6 | 6 | 0 | 0 | 22 | 2 | +20 | 18 | Advance to round of 16 | — | 5–1 | 5–0 | 4–0 |
| 2 | (Iraq) Al-Zawraa | 6 | 3 | 0 | 3 | 8 | 11 | −3 | 9 | Advance to round of 16 | 0–2 | — | 2–1 | 2–1 |
| 3 | (Tajikistan) Istiklol | 6 | 3 | 0 | 3 | 7 | 13 | −6 | 9 | | 0–4 | 2–1 | — | 2–0 |
| 4 | (India) Goa | 6 | 0 | 0 | 6 | 3 | 14 | −11 | 0 | | 1–2 | 0–2 | 1–2 | — |

Source: ACL2
Rules for classification: Tiebreakers
17 September 2025
19:30 IST
Group Stage

| Goa (All India Football Federation) | 0–2 | (Iraq Football Association) Al-Zawraa |
|---|---|---|
| | Report | Bani Hani 44'; Al-Rashdan 90+5' |

Jawaharlal Nehru Stadium, Goa, India
Attendance: 8,756
Referee: Baraa Aisha (Palestine)
1 October 2025
19:15 IST
Group Stage

| Istiklol (Tajikistan Football Federation) | 2–0 | (All India Football Federation) Goa |
|---|---|---|
| Soirov 46'; Dehghani 74' | Report |

Hisor Central Stadium, Hisor, Tajikistan
Attendance: 5,750
Referee: Thoriq Alkatiri (Indonesia)
22 October 2025
19:30 IST
Group Stage

| Goa (All India Football Federation) | 1–2 | (Saudi Arabian Football Federation) Al-Nassr |
|---|---|---|
| Fernandes 41' | Report | Ângelo 10'; Camara 27' |

Jawaharlal Nehru Stadium, Goa, India
Attendance: 14,389
Referee: Adel Al-Naqbi (United Arab Emirates)
6 November 2025
00:15 IST
Group Stage

| Al-Nassr (Saudi Arabian Football Federation) | 4–0 | (All India Football Federation) Goa |
|---|---|---|
| Ghareeb 35', 53'; Maran 65'; João Félix 84' | Report |

Al-Awwal Park, Riyadh, Saudi Arabia
Attendance: 6,736
Referee: Kim Hee-gon (South Korea)
26 November 2025
21:30 IST
Group Stage

| Al-Zawraa (Iraq Football Association) | 2–1 | (All India Football Federation) Goa |
|---|---|---|
| Raad 38'; Abdulkareem 65' | Report | Ismail 51' (o.g.) |

Al Zawraa Stadium, Baghdad, Iraq
Attendance: 8,322
Referee: Firdavs Norsafarov (Uzbekistan)
24 December 2025
21:30 IST
Group Stage

| Goa (All India Football Federation) | 1–2 | (Tajikistan Football Federation) Istiklol |
|---|---|---|
| Dražić 8' | Report | Komolafe 53'; Dzhuraboev 56' (pen.) |

Jawaharlal Nehru Stadium, Goa, India
Attendance: 1,083
Referee: Ammar Mahfoodh (Bahrain)

== Kabaddi ==
=== Pro Kabaddi League ===
The 2025 Pro Kabaddi League will be the 12th edition of the Pro Kabaddi League, a franchise-based Kabaddi league in India, organised by Mashal Sports since 2014. The season will begin on 29 August 2025 and will conclude on TBD.

==== Points Table ====
| Pos | Team | Pld | W | L | SD | Pts | |
|---|---|---|---|---|---|---|---|
| 1 | Puneri Paltan (R) | 18 | 13 | 5 | 88 | 26 | Qualified for Qualifiers |
| 2 | Dabang Delhi K.C. (C) | 18 | 13 | 5 | 38 | 26 | Qualified for Qualifiers |
| 3 | Bengaluru Bulls | 18 | 11 | 7 | 97 | 22 | Qualified for Mini-qualifier |
| 4 | Telugu Titans | 18 | 10 | 8 | 45 | 20 | Qualified for Mini-qualifier |
| 5 | Haryana Steelers | 18 | 10 | 8 | 40 | 20 | Qualified for Play-ins |
| 6 | U Mumba | 18 | 10 | 8 | 8 | 20 | Qualified for Play-ins |
| 7 | Patna Pirates | 18 | 8 | 10 | 12 | 16 | Qualified for Play-ins |
| 8 | Jaipur Pink Panthers | 18 | 8 | 10 | -48 | 16 | Qualified for Play-ins |
| 9 | UP Yoddhas | 18 | 7 | 11 | -65 | 14 | |
| 10 | Tamil Thalaivas | 18 | 6 | 12 | -36 | 12 | |
| 11 | Gujarat Giants | 18 | 6 | 12 | -73 | 12 | |
| 12 | Bengal Warriorz | 18 | 6 | 12 | -106 | 12 | |

Source: ProKabaddi
Rules for classification:
- 2 points for a win
- 0 point for a loss
(C) Champion; (R) Runners up

== Kho Kho ==
=== Kho Kho World Cup ===
India hosted the inaugural Kho Kho World Cup, which was held at the Indira Gandhi Arena in New Delhi, India from 13 to 19 January 2025. India defeated Nepal in both the men's and women's competition to be crowned champions.

==== Men's Group Stage ====
| Pos | Team | Pld | W | L | T | PS | PL | PD | Pts | Qualification |
|---|---|---|---|---|---|---|---|---|---|---|
| 1 | India (H) | 4 | 4 | 0 | 0 | 249 | 143 | +106 | 12 | Advanced to the knockout stage |
| 2 | Nepal | 4 | 3 | 1 | 0 | 349 | 92 | +257 | 9 | Advanced to the knockout stage |
| 3 | Bhutan | 4 | 2 | 2 | 0 | 196 | 207 | -11 | 6 | |
| 4 | Peru | 4 | 1 | 3 | 0 | 139 | 274 | -135 | 3 | |
| 5 | Brazil | 4 | 0 | 4 | 0 | 90 | 307 | -217 | 0 | |

Source: KKWC 2025
(H) Host

13 January 2025
20:30 IST
Result

| India | 42–37 | Nepal |

India won by 5 points
Indira Gandhi Indoor Stadium, New Delhi

14 January 2025
20:15 IST
Result

| India | 66–34 | Brazil |

India won by 32 points
Indira Gandhi Indoor Stadium, New Delhi

15 January 2025
20:15 IST
Result

| India | 70–38 | Peru |

India won by 32 points
Indira Gandhi Indoor Stadium, New Delhi

16 January 2025
20:15 IST
Result

| India | 71–34 | Bhutan |

India won by 37 points
Indira Gandhi Indoor Stadium, New Delhi

==== Men's Knockouts ====
Quarter-Final 4
17 January 2025
20:15 IST
Result

| India | 100–40 | Sri Lanka |

India won by 60 points
Indira Gandhi Indoor Stadium, New Delhi

Player of the match: Ramji Kashyap (India)

Semi-Final 2
18 January 2025
20:15 IST
Result

| South Africa | 42–62 | India |

India won by 20 points
Indira Gandhi Indoor Stadium, New Delhi

Player of the match: Gowtham MK (India)

Final
19 January 2025
20:15 IST
Result

| Nepal | 36–54 | India |

India won by 18 points
Indira Gandhi Indoor Stadium, New Delhi

Player of the match: Mehul (India)

==== Women's Group Stage ====
| Pos | Team | Pld | W | L | T | PS | PL | PD | Pts | Qualification |
|---|---|---|---|---|---|---|---|---|---|---|
| 1 | India (H) | 3 | 3 | 0 | 0 | 375 | 54 | +321 | 9 | Advanced to the knockout stage |
| 2 | Iran | 3 | 2 | 1 | 0 | 167 | 138 | +39 | 6 | Advanced to the knockout stage |
| 3 | South Korea | 3 | 1 | 2 | 0 | 90 | 316 | -226 | 3 | |
| 4 | Malaysia | 3 | 0 | 3 | 0 | 80 | 204 | -124 | 0 | |

Source: KKWC 2025
(H) Host

14 January 2025
19:00 IST
Result

| India | 175–18 | South Korea |

India won by 157 points
Indira Gandhi Indoor Stadium, New Delhi

15 January 2025
19:00 IST
Result

| India | 100–16 | Iran |

India won by 84 points
Indira Gandhi Indoor Stadium, New Delhi

16 January 2025
19:00 IST
Result

| India | 100–20 | Malaysia |

India won by 80 points
Indira Gandhi Indoor Stadium, New Delhi

==== Women's knockouts ====
Quarter-Final 4
17 January 2025
19:00 IST
Result

| India | 109–16 | Bangladesh |

India won by 93 points
Indira Gandhi Indoor Stadium, New Delhi

Player of the match: Ashwani Shinde (India)

Semi-Final 2
18 January 2025
19:00 IST
Result

| South Africa | 16–66 | India |

India won by 50 points
Indira Gandhi Indoor Stadium, New Delhi

Player of the match: Vaishnavi Bajrang (India)

Final
19 January 2025
19:00 IST
Result

| Nepal | 40–78 | India |

India won by 38 points
Indira Gandhi Indoor Stadium, New Delhi

Player of the match: Chaithra B (India)

== Rugby ==
=== Rugby Premier League ===
The 2025 Rugby Premier League was the first season of the Rugby Premier League. It was held from 15 to 29 June 2025 with 6 city-based teams. Chennai Bulls defeated Delhi Redz 41–0 to win the inaugural title.

==== League table ====
| Pos | Team | Pld | W | D | L | Pts | Qualification |
|---|---|---|---|---|---|---|---|
| 1 | Hyderabad Heroes | 10 | 9 | 0 | 1 | 36 | Advance to playoffs |
| 2 | Chennai Bulls (C) | 10 | 6 | 1 | 3 | 25 | Advance to playoffs |
| 3 | Bengaluru Bravehearts | 10 | 5 | 1 | 4 | 21 | Advance to playoffs |
| 4 | Delhi Redz | 10 | 3 | 2 | 5 | 14 | Advance to playoffs |
| 5 | Kalinga Black Tigers | 10 | 2 | 2 | 6 | 10 | |
| 6 | Mumbai Dreamers | 10 | 1 | 2 | 7 | 6 | |

First match(es) will be played: 1 June 2025. Source: Rugby Premier League
Rules for classification: Tiebreakers for teams tied on points: 1) Number of matches won; 2) Difference between points for and against; 3) Total number of points for; 4) Aggregate number of points scored in matches between tied teams; 5) Number of matches won excluding the first match, then the second and so on until the tie is settled.
(C) Champion

==== Semi-finals ====
28 June 2025
19:30

| Chennai Bulls | 31–12 | Bengaluru Bravehearts |
| | Report |

Mumbai Football Arena, Mumbai
Referee: Craig Chan

28 June 2025
20:00

| Hyderabad Heroes | 7–14 | Delhi Redz |
| | Report |

Mumbai Football Arena, Mumbai
Referee: Ibuki Tetsuka

==== Third place playoff ====
29 June 2025
19:30

| Bengaluru Bravehearts | 12–17 | Hyderabad Heroes |
| | Report |

Mumbai Football Arena, Mumbai
Referee: Tetsuya Hirakawa

==== Final ====
29 June 2025
20:00

| Chennai Bulls | 41–0 | Delhi Redz |
| | Report |

Mumbai Football Arena, Mumbai
Referee: Craig Chan

== Sepak takraw ==
=== ISTAF World Cup ===
India hosted the 2025 ISTAF World Cup, held at the Patliputra Indoor Stadium, Bihar. India secured their first men's team regu gold medal and their second overall gold in World Cup history. India ended with one bronze, one silver and five bronze medals, making it their most successful World Cup campaign.

| Event | Group Stage | | | | | Quarter-finals | Semi-finals | Final | |
| Event | Opposition Score | Opposition Score | Opposition Score | Opposition Score | Rank | Opposition Score | Opposition Score | Opposition Score | Rank |
|---|---|---|---|---|---|---|---|---|---|
| Men's Doubles | Poland; W 2–0 | Poland; L 0–2 | Chinese Taipei; W 2–0 | Vietnam; W 2–1 | 2Q | —N/a | Myanmar; L 0–2 | —N/a | 3rd place, bronze medalist(s) |
| Men's Regu | New Zealand; W 2–0 | United States; W 2–0 | —N/a | | 1Q | —N/a | Iran; W 2–0 | Japan; W 2–1 | 1st place, gold medalist(s) |
| Men's Quadrant | New Zealand; W 2–0 | United States; W 2–1 | Iran; W 2–1 | —N/a | 1Q | Singapore; W 2–1 | Vietnam; L 1–2 | —N/a | 3rd place, bronze medalist(s) |
| Women's Doubles | China w/o | France w/o | Japan; W 2–0 | —N/a | 1Q | —N/a | Iran; W 2–0 | Myanmar; L 0–2 | 2nd place, silver medalist(s) |
| Women's Regu | Malaysia; W 2–0 | Nepal; W 2–0 | Poland; W 2–0 | —N/a | 1Q | —N/a | Vietnam; L 0–2 | —N/a | 3rd place, bronze medalist(s) |
| Women's Quadrant | China w/o | Iran; W 2–0 | Nepal; W 2–0 | Malaysia; L 1–2 | 2Q | —N/a | Thailand; L 0–2 | —N/a | 3rd place, bronze medalist(s) |
| Mixed Quadrant | Nepal; W 2–0 | Vietnam; W 2–0 | Japan; W 2–0 | —N/a | 1Q | —N/a | Myanmar; L 0–2 | —N/a | 3rd place, bronze medalist(s) |

== Shooting ==
=== 2025 ISSF World Cup ===
India is participating in the 2025 ISSF World Cup from 1 April to 9 December 2025, which is held across various locations.

| Medal | Player | Event | Category | Date | Ref. |
|---|---|---|---|---|---|
| (gold) Gold | Sift Kaur Samra | Rifle | 50m Rifle 3 Positions Women | 4 April | |
| (gold) Gold | Rudrankksh Balasaheb Patil | Rifle | 10m Air Men | 6 April | |
| (gold) Gold | Suruchi Inder Singh | Pistol | 10m Air Women | 8 April | |
| (gold) Gold | Vijayveer Sidhu | Pistol | 25m Rapid Fire Men | 8 April | |
| (gold) Gold | Suruchi Inder Singh | Pistol | 10m Air Women | 15 April | |
| (gold) Gold | Suruchi Inder Singh; Saurabh Chaudhary | Pistol | 10m Air Mixed Team | 16 April | |
| (gold) Gold | Suruchi Inder Singh | Pistol | 10m Air Women | 13 June | |
| (gold) Gold | Arya Borse; Arjun Babuta | Rifle | 10m Air Mixed Team | 14 June | |
| (gold) Gold | Esha Singh | Pistol | 10m Air Women | 13 September | |
| (silver) Silver | Esha Singh | Pistol | 25m Women | 5 April | |
| (silver) Silver | Arya Borse; Rudrankksh Balasaheb Patil | Rifle | 10m Air Mixed Team | 9 April | |
| (silver) Silver | Manu Bhaker | Pistol | 10m Air Women | 15 April | |
| (silver) Silver | Arjun Babuta | Rifle | 10m Air Men | 19 April | |
| (silver) Silver | Arya Borse; Rudrankksh Balasaheb Patil | Rifle | 10m Air Mixed Team | 20 April | |
| (silver) Silver | Simranpreet Kaur Brar | Pistol | 25m Women | 21 April | |
| (bronze) Bronze | Chain Singh | Rifle | 50m Rifle 3 Positions Men | 4 April | |
| (bronze) Bronze | Suruchi Inder Singh; Saurabh Chaudhary | Pistol | 10m Air Mixed Team | 10 April | |
| (bronze) Bronze | Saurabh Chaudhary | Pistol | 10m Air Men | 15 April | |
| (bronze) Bronze | Kynan Chenai; Sabeera Haris | Shotgun | Trap Mixed Team | 11 May | |
| (bronze) Bronze | Elavenil Valarivan | Rifle | 10m Air Women | 10 June | |
| (bronze) Bronze | Sift Kaur Samra | Rifle | 50m Rifle 3 Positions Women | 12 June | |
| (bronze) Bronze | Meghana Sajjanar | Rifle | 10m Air Women | 14 September | |

=== 2025 Asian Shooting Championships ===
==== Senior ====
| Medal | Player | Event | Category | Date | Ref. |
|---|---|---|---|---|---|
| (gold) Gold | Rudrankksh Patil; Arjun Babuta; Kiran Jadhav | Rifle | Men's 10m Air Team | 21 August | |
| (gold) Gold | Elavenil Valarivan | Rifle | Women's 10m Air | 22 August | |
| (gold) Gold | Elavenil Valarivan; Arjun Babuta | Rifle | 10m Air Mixed Team | 23 August | |
| (gold) Gold | Aishwary Pratap Singh | Rifle | Men's 50m Rifle 3 Positions | 24 August | |
| (gold) Gold | Sift Kaur Samra; Ashi Chouksey; Anjum Moudgil | Rifle | Women's 50m Rifle 3 Positions Team | 26 August | |
| (gold) Gold | Sift Kaur Samra | Rifle | Women's 50m Rifle 3 Positions | 26 August | |
| (gold) Gold | Ankur Mittal | Shotgun | Men's Double Trap | 29 August | |
| (gold) Gold | | | | | |
| (silver) Silver | Anmol Jain; Aditya Malra; Saurabh Chaudhary | Pistol | Men's 10m Air Team | 18 August | |
| (silver) Silver | Aishwary Pratap Singh; Chain Singh; Akhil Sheoran | Rifle | Men's 50m Rifle 3 Positions Team | 24 August | |
| (silver) Silver | Bhowneesh Mendiratta | Shotgun | Men's Trap | 25 August | |
| (silver) Silver | Adarsh Singh; Anish Bhanwala; Neeraj Kumar | Pistol | Men's 25m Rapid Fire Team | 26 August | |
| (silver) Silver | Anish Bhanwala | Pistol | Men's 25m Rapid Fire | 26 August | |
| (silver) Silver | Kumar Yogesh; Amanpreet Singh; Ravinder Singh | Pistol | Men's 50m Team | 27 August | |
| (silver) Silver | Manini Kaushik; Surabhi Rapole; Vidarsa Vinod | Rifle | Women's 50m Prone Team | 29 August | |
| (silver) Silver | | | | | |
| (bronze) Bronze | Manu Bhaker; Suruchi Singh; Palak Gulia | Pistol | Women's 10m Air Team | 19 August | |
| (bronze) Bronze | Manu Bhaker | Pistol | Women's 10m Air | 19 August | |
| (bronze) Bronze | Suruchi Singh; Saurabh Chaudhary | Pistol | 10m Air Mixed Team | 20 August | |
| (bronze) Bronze | Elavenil Valarivan; Mehuli Ghosh; Ananya Naidu | Rifle | Women's 10m Air Team | 22 August | |
| (bronze) Bronze | Esha Singh; Manu Bhaker; Simranpreet Brar | Pistol | Women's 25m Team | 24 August | |
| (bronze) Bronze | Manini Kaushik | Rifle | Women's 50m Prone | 29 August | |
| (bronze) Bronze | | | | | |

== Squash ==
=== 2025 Men's World Squash Championship ===
India participated in the 2025 Men's World Squash Championship and entered three players for the tournament.

| Athlete | Round of 64 | Round of 32 | Round of 16 | Quarterfinals | Semifinals | Final / BM | |
| Athlete | Opposition Score | Opposition Score | Opposition Score | Opposition Score | Opposition Score | Opposition Score | Rank |
|---|---|---|---|---|---|---|---|
| Abhay Singh | (Switzerland) Müller; W 3-1 | (Egypt) Ibrahim; L 0-3 | Did not advance to next round | | | | |
| Ramit Tandon | (Japan) Tsukue; W 3-1 | (England) El Shorbagy; L 2-3 | Did not advance to next round | | | | |
| Veer Chotrani | (England) James; W 3-1 | (Egypt) Farag; L 1-3 | Did not advance to next round | | | | |

=== 2025 Women's World Squash Championship ===
India participated in the 2025 Women's World Squash Championship. Only Anahat Singh qualified for the tournament.

| Athlete | Round of 64 | Round of 32 | Round of 16 | Quarterfinals | Semifinals | Final / BM | |
| Athlete | Opposition Score | Opposition Score | Opposition Score | Opposition Score | Opposition Score | Opposition Score | Rank |
|---|---|---|---|---|---|---|---|
| Anahat Singh | (United States) Stefanoni; W 3-2 | (Egypt) Aboelkheir; L 1-3 | Did not advance to next round | | | | |

== Table Tennis ==
=== 2025 World Table Tennis Championships ===
India participated in the 2025 World Table Tennis Championships held in Doha, Qatar, from 17 to 25 May 2025.

| Athlete | Event | Seed | First Round | Second Round | Third Round | Fourth Round | Quarterfinals | Semifinals | Final / BM | |
| Athlete | Event | Seed | Opposition Score | Opposition Score | Opposition Score | Opposition Score | Opposition Score | Opposition Score | Opposition Score | Rank |
|---|---|---|---|---|---|---|---|---|---|---|
| Ankur Bhattacharjee | Men's; Singles | —N/a | (Hong Kong) Lam; L 1–4 | Did not advance to next round | | | | | | |
| Manush Shah | Men's; Singles | —N/a | (Portugal) Apolónia; L 2–4 | Did not advance to next round | | | | | | |
| Manav Thakkar | Men's; Singles | —N/a | (New Zealand) Choi; W 4–1 | (Japan) Harimoto; L 2–4 | Did not advance to next round | | | | | |
| Sathiyan Gnanasekaran | Men's; Singles | —N/a | (France) Poret; L 0–4 | Did not advance to next round | | | | | | |
| Diya Chitale | Women's; Singles | —N/a | (Spain) Zhang; W 4–0 | (Chinese Taipei) Cheng; L 1–4 | Did not advance to next round | | | | | |
| Manika Batra | Women's; Singles | 22 | (Nigeria) Bello; W 4–0 | (South Korea) Park; L 0–4 | Did not advance to next round | | | | | |
| Sreeja Akula | Women's; Singles | 25 | (Thailand) Sawettabut; L 1–4 | Did not advance to next round | | | | | | |
| Yashaswini Ghorpade | Women's; Singles | —N/a | (France) Yuan; L 1–4 | Did not advance to next round | | | | | | |
| Harmeet Desai; Sathiyan Gnanasekaran | Men's; Doubles | —N/a | (Chile) Burgos / Gómez; L 1–3 | Did not advance to next round | | | | | | |
| Manush Shah; Manav Thakkar | Men's; Doubles | 8 | (Slovenia) Hribar / Kozul; W 3–1 | (Germany) Qiu / Duda; L 1–3 | Did not advance to next round | | | | | |
| Diya Chitale; Yashaswini Ghorpade | Women's; Doubles | 12 | (Uzbekistan) Magdieva / Erkebaeva; W 3–1 | (Singapore) Zeng / Ser; W 3–1 | (Japan) Harimoto / Kihara; L 0–3 | Did not advance to next round | | | | |
| Sutirtha Mukherjee; Ayhika Mukherjee | Women's; Doubles | 14 | (Turkey) Yilmaz / Harac; W 3–2 | (Germany) Kaufmann / Shan; L 0–3 | Did not advance to next round | | | | | |
| Diya Chitale; Manush Shah | Mixed; Doubles | 9 | (Algeria) Bouloussa / Nasri; W 3–0 | (South Korea) Oh / Kim; L 0–3 | Did not advance to next round | | | | | |
| Harmeet Desai; Yashaswini Ghorpade | Mixed; Doubles | 14 | (France) Poret / Hochart; L 2–3 | Did not advance to next round | | | | | | |

=== 2025 Asian Table Tennis Championships ===
India will host the 2025 Asian Table Tennis Championships, held in Bhubaneshwar from 11 to 15 October 2025. Only team events will be played in this edition.

=== 2025 ITTF-ATTU Asian Cup ===
India participated in the 34th ITTF-ATTU Asian Cup held in Shenzhen, China from 19 to 23 February 2025. Six players were sent to participate in the tournament, with no one crossing the group stage mark and were thus eliminated.

== Tennis ==
=== Bengaluru Open ===
The 2025 Bengaluru Open was a professional tennis tournament played on hard courts. It was the eighth edition of the tournament which was part of the 2025 ATP Challenger Tour. It took place in Bengaluru, from 24 February to 2 March 2025. Anirudh Chandrasekar and Taipei's Ray Ho won the men's doubles title after defeating Blake Bayldon and Matthew Romios 6–2, 6–4 in the final.

== Weightlifting ==
=== 2025 Commonwealth Weightlifting Championships ===
The 2025 edition of the Commonwealth Weightlifting Championships was held in Ahmedabad, India, between 24 and 30 August 2025. The event was inaugurated by Indian sports minister Mansukh Mandaviya. Mirabai Chanu won gold in the women's 48 kg event. She lifted a record-breaking total of 193 kg (84 kg snatch and 109 kg clean and jerk), setting a new commonwealth championship record. Priteesmita Bhoi and Dharamjyoti Dewghariya also won gold medal in women's 44–48 kg and men's 56–60 kg events respectively.

== Wrestling ==
=== 2025 U20 World Wrestling Championships ===
The 2025 edition of the U20 World Wrestling Championships were held in Samokov, Bulgaria between 17 and 24 August 2025. India finished their campaign with 9 medals - 2 gold, 4 silver and 3 bronze - and were placed 4th at the medal tally.

| Medal | Player | Category | Event | Date | Ref. |
|---|---|---|---|---|---|
| 1st place, gold medalist(s) | Tapasya Gahlawat | Freestyle | Women's 57 kg | 20 August | |
| 1st place, gold medalist(s) | Kajal Dochak | Freestyle | Women's 72 kg | 22 August | |
| 2nd place, silver medalist(s) | Sumit Malik | Freestyle | Men's 57 kg | 19 August | |
| 2nd place, silver medalist(s) | Srishti | Freestyle | Women's 68 kg | 20 August | |
| 2nd place, silver medalist(s) | Reena | Freestyle | Women's 55 kg | 21 August | |
| 2nd place, silver medalist(s) | Priya Malik | Freestyle | Women's 76 kg | 21 August | |
| 3rd place, bronze medalist(s) | Suraj | Greco-Roman | Men's 60 kg | 22 August | |
| 3rd place, bronze medalist(s) | Shruti | Freestyle | Women's 50 kg | 22 August | |
| 3rd place, bronze medalist(s) | Saarika | Freestyle | Women's 53 kg | 22 August | |
