= List of Women's Premier League (cricket) records and statistics =

The Women's Premier League (WPL) is a women's Twenty20 (WT20) cricket competition, organized by the Board of Control for Cricket in India (BCCI), the national governing body of cricket in India. T20 cricket is a shorter format of the game, with each team playing a single innings of 20 overs. The inaugural season of the WPL was held in 2023, and the tournament has been held annually in India ever since. Currently, five teams compete for the championship. Since the league's inception, two teams have won the title, with the Mumbai Indians (MI) and Royal Challengers Bengaluru (RCB) securing two titles each.

English player Nat Sciver-Brunt holds the records for the most runs scored (1,346) in the league. New Zealand bowler Amelia Kerr holds the record for the most wickets taken (52). Australian bowler Ellyse Perry holds the record for the best bowling figures with 6/15.

UP Warriorz scored the most runs in a match with a score of 225/5 against the Royal Challengers Bengaluru (RCB) in 2025. The highest successful run chase in the league's history was achieved by RCB as they chased down a target of 204 set by the Delhi Capitals (DC) in the 2026 final. Gujarat Giants scored the lowest total, making just 64 runs against the Mumbai Indians in 2023.

== Listing criteria ==
In general, the top five are listed in each category, except when there is a tie for the last place among the five, in which case all the tied record holders are noted.

== Listing notation ==
Team notation

- (200/3) indicates that a team scored 200 runs for three wickets and the innings was closed, either due to a successful run chase or if no playing time remained
- (200) indicates that a team scored 200 runs and was all out

Batting notation

- (100) indicates that a batsman scored 100 runs and was out
- (100*) indicates that a batsman scored 100 runs and was not out

Bowling notation

- (5/20) indicates that a bowler has captured five wickets while conceding 20 runs

Date

- indicates the date the match was played

== Team records ==
=== By season ===
Out of the five franchises that have played in the league, Mumbai Indians and Royal Challengers Bengaluru are the most successful teams in the league's history with two titles each. The current champions are Bengaluru who beat Delhi Capitals in the 2026 WPL final to clinch their second title.

Season (No. of teams)	2023 (5)	2024 (5)	2025 (5)	2026 (5)
Delhi Capitals	RU	RU	RU	RU
Gujarat Giants	5th	5th	3rd	3rd
Mumbai Indians	C	3rd	C	4th
Royal Challengers Bengaluru	4th	C	4th	C
UP Warriorz	3rd	4th	5th	5th

- Current teams are listed alphabetically.
- C: champions
- RU: runner-up
- 3rd: team lost the Eliminator.

=== Team wins, losses and draws ===
Teams are ordered by best result then by winning percentage, then alphabetically:

Team	Appearances			Best result	Statistics						
Team	Total	First	Latest	Best result	Played	Won	Lost	Tied+W	Tied+L	NR	Win%
Mumbai Indians	4	2023	2026	Champions (2023, 2025)	37	23	14	0	0	0	62.16
Royal Challengers Bengaluru	4	2023	2026	Champions (2024, 2026)	35	18	16	0	1	0	52.86
Delhi Capitals	4	2023	2026	Runners-up (2023, 2024, 2025, 2026)	37	22	15	0	0	0	59.46
Gujarat Giants	4	2023	2026	Eliminator (2025, 2026)	34	13	21	0	0	0	38.23
UP Warriorz	4	2023	2026	Eliminator (2023)	33	11	21	1	0	0	34.84

Source: ESPNcricinfo (Last updated: 5 February 2026)

Notes:

- Tie+W and Tie+L indicates matches tied and then won or lost by super over
- The result percentage excludes no results and counts ties (irrespective of a tiebreaker) as half a win

== Result records ==
=== Greatest win margin (by runs) ===
Margin	Team	Opposition	Venue	Date
143 Runs	MI	GG	DY Patil Stadium, Navi Mumbai	4 March 2023
81 Runs	GG	UPW	Ekana Cricket Stadium, Lucknow	3 March 2025
72 Runs	MI	UPW	DY Patil Stadium, Navi Mumbai	24 March 2023
61 Runs	RCB	GG	Baroda Cricket Association Stadium, Vadodara	19 January 2026
60 Runs	DC	RCB	Brabourne Stadium, Mumbai	5 March 2023
Last updated: 19 January 2026

=== Greatest win margin (by balls remaining) ===
Balls remaining	Margin	Team	Opposition	Venue	Date
77	10 wickets	DC	GG	DY Patil Stadium, Navi Mumbai	11 March 2023
66	9 wickets	DC	MI	DY Patil Stadium, Navi Mumbai	20 March 2023
47	9 wickets	RCB	UPW	DY Patil Stadium, Navi Mumbai	12 January 2026
45	8 wickets	RCB	GG	M. Chinnaswamy Stadium, Bengaluru	27 February 2024
42	10 wickets	UPW	RCB	Brabourne Stadium, Mumbai	10 March 2023
Last updated: 12 January 2026

=== Greatest win margin (by wickets) ===
Margin	Team	Opposition	Venue	Date
10 wickets	UPW	RCB	Brabourne Stadium, Mumbai	10 March 2023
10 wickets	DC	GG	DY Patil Stadium, Navi Mumbai	11 March 2023
9 wickets	MI	RCB	Brabourne Stadium, Mumbai	6 March 2023
9 wickets	DC	MI	DY Patil Stadium, Navi Mumbai	20 March 2023
9 wickets	DC	UPW	M. Chinnaswamy Stadium, Bengaluru	26 February 2024
9 wickets	DC	MI	M. Chinnaswamy Stadium, Bengaluru	28 February 2025
9 wickets	DC	RCB	M. Chinnaswamy Stadium, Bengaluru	1 March 2025
9 wickets	RCB	UPW	DY Patil Stadium, Navi Mumbai	12 January 2026
Last updated: 12 January 2026

=== Narrowest win margin (by runs) ===
Margin	Team	Opposition	Venue	Date
1 run	UPW	DC	Arun Jaitley Cricket Stadium, Delhi	8 March 2024
1 run	DC	RCB	Arun Jaitley Cricket Stadium, Delhi	10 March 2024
2 runs	RCB	UPW	M. Chinnaswamy Stadium, Bengaluru	24 February 2024
3 runs	GG	DC	Baroda Cricket Association Stadium, Vadodara	27 January 2026
4 runs	GG	DC	DY Patil Stadium, Navi Mumbai	11 January 2026
Last updated: 27 January 2026

=== Narrowest win margin (by wickets) ===
Margin	Team	Opposition	Venue	Date
2 wickets	DC	MI	Baroda Cricket Association Stadium, Vadodara	15 February 2025
3 wickets	UPW	GG	DY Patil Stadium, Navi Mumbai	5 March 2023
3 wickets	UPW	GG	Brabourne Stadium, Mumbai	20 March 2023
3 wickets	RCB	MI	DY Patil Stadium, Navi Mumbai	9 January 2026
4 wickets	MI	RCB	DY Patil Stadium, Navi Mumbai	21 March 2023
4 wickets	MI	RCB	M. Chinnaswamy Stadium, Bengaluru	21 February 2025
4 wickets	MI	DC	M. Chinnaswamy Stadium, Bengaluru	23 February 2024
Last updated: 9 January 2026

=== Highest successful chases ===
Score	Team	Opposition	Target	Venue	Date
204/4	RCB	DC	204	Baroda Cricket Association Stadium, Vadodara	5 February 2026
202/4	RCB	GG	202	Baroda Cricket Association Stadium, Vadodara	14 February 2025
193/3	MI	GG	193	DY Patil Stadium, Navi Mumbai	13 January 2026
191/3	MI	GG	191	Arun Jaitley Cricket Stadium, Delhi	9 March 2024
189/2	RCB	GG	189	Brabourne Stadium, Mumbai	18 March 2023
Last updated: 5 February 2026

=== Lowest successful defence ===
Target	Team	Opposition	Score	Venue	Date
136	RCB	MI	130/6	Arun Jaitley Cricket Stadium, Delhi	15 March 2024
139	UPW	DC	137	Arun Jaitley Cricket Stadium, Delhi	8 March 2024
148	GG	DC	136	Brabourne Stadium, Mumbai	16 March 2023
150	MI	DC	141/9	Brabourne Stadium, Mumbai	15 March 2025
153	GG	UPW	144/5	Arun Jaitley Cricket Stadium, Delhi	11 March 2024
Last updated: 15 March 2025

=== Tied Matches ===
As of March 2025, matches have resulted in a tie on only 1 occasion. This occurred during the 2025 season when Royal Challengers Bengaluru and UP Warriorz played at Bengaluru. All tied matches in the WPL are resolved by using a super over.

== Team scoring records ==
=== Highest team total ===
As of 13 March 2025

Score	Team	Opposition	Venue	Date
225/5	UP Warriorz	Royal Challengers Bengaluru	Ekana Cricket Stadium, Lucknow	8 March 2025
223/2	Delhi Capitals	Royal Challengers Bengaluru	Brabourne Stadium, Mumbai	5 March 2023
213	Royal Challengers Bengaluru	UP Warriorz	Ekana Cricket Stadium, Lucknow	8 March 2025
213/4	Mumbai Indians	Gujarat Giants	Brabourne Stadium, Mumbai	13 March 2025
211/4	Delhi Capitals	UP Warriorz	DY Patil Stadium, Navi Mumbai	7 March 2023

- Source: ESPNcricinfo

=== Lowest team total ===
As of 3 March 2025

Score	Team	Opposition	Venue	Date
64	Gujarat Giants	Mumbai Indians	DY Patil Stadium, Navi Mumbai	4 March 2023
105	Delhi Capitals	Mumbai Indians	DY Patil Stadium, Navi Mumbai	9 March 2023
105	UP Warriorz	Gujarat Giants	Ekana Cricket Stadium, Lucknow	11 March 2023
105/9	Gujarat Giants	Delhi Capitals	DY Patil Stadium, Navi Mumbai	3 March 2025
107/9	Gujarat Giants	Mumbai Indians	Brabourne Stadium, Mumbai	14 March 2023

- Source: ESPNcricinfo

=== Highest match aggregate ===
As of 5 February 2026

Aggregate	Team 1	Score 1	Team 2	Score 2	Venue	Date
438/15	UPW	225/5	RCB	213/10	Ekana Cricket Stadium, Lucknow	8 March 2025
414/15	GG	209/10	DC	205/5	DY Patil Stadium, Navi Mumbai	5 February 2026
407/8	DC	203/4	RCB	204/4	Baroda Cricket Association Stadium, Vadodara	8 March 2023
404/12	GG	207/4	UPW	197/8	DY Patil Stadium, Navi Mumbai	10 January 2026
403/9	GG	201/5	RCB	202/4	Baroda Cricket Association Stadium, Vadodara	14 February 2025

- Source: ESPNcricinfo

=== Lowest match aggregate ===
As of 24 January 2026

Score	Team 1	Score 1	Team 2	Score 2	Venue	Date
212	Gujarat Giants	105/9	Delhi Capitals	107/0	DY Patil Stadium, Navi Mumbai	11 March 2023
214	Delhi Capitals	105	Mumbai Indians	109/2	DY Patil Stadium, Navi Mumbai	9 March 2023
217	Gujarat Giants	107/7	Royal Challengers Bengaluru	110/2	M. Chinnaswamy Stadium, Bengaluru	27 February 2024
219	Mumbai Indians	109/8	Delhi Capitals	110/1	DY Patil Stadium, Navi Mumbai	20 March 2023
220	Royal Challengers Bengaluru	109	Delhi Capitals	111/3	DY Patil Stadium, Navi Mumbai	24 January 2026

- Source: ESPNcricinfo

== Individual batting records ==
=== Most career runs ===
As of 5 February 2026

Runs	Player	Team	Innings	Seasons
1,348	Nat Sciver-Brunt	MI	36	2023–2026
1,200	Meg Lanning	DC/UPW	35	2023–2026
1,193	Harmanpreet Kaur	MI	34	2023–2026
1,124	Shafali Verma	DC	37	2023–2026
1,023	Smriti Mandhana	RCB	35	2023–2026

- Source: ESPNcricinfo

=== Highest individual score ===
As of 26 January 2026

Runs	Player	Team	Opposition	Venue	Date
100*	Nat Sciver-Brunt	MI	RCB	Baroda Cricket Association Stadium, Vadodara	26 January 2026
99*	Georgia Voll	UPW	RCB	Ekana Cricket Stadium, Lucknow	8 March 2025
99	Sophie Devine	RCB	GG	Brabourne Stadium, Mumbai	18 March 2023
96*	Alyssa Healy	UPW	RCB	Brabourne Stadium, Mumbai	10 March 2023
96*	Beth Mooney	GG	UPW	Ekana Cricket Stadium, Lucknow	3 March 2025

- Source: ESPNcricinfo

=== Most Fifties ===
As of 6 February 2026

Fifties	Player	Team	Career
12	Nat Sciver-Brunt	MI	2023–2026
11	Harmanpreet Kaur	MI	2023–2026
11	Meg Lanning	DC/UPW	2023–2026
8	Ellyse Perry	RCB	2023–2026
7	Beth Mooney	GG	2023–2026
7	Ashleigh Gardner	GG	2023–2026
7	Smriti Mandhana	RCB	2023–2026
7	Shafali Verma	DC	2023–2026

- Source: ESPNcricinfo

=== Most runs in a season ===
As of 5 February 2026

Runs	Player	Team	Season
523	Nat Sciver-Brunt	MI	2025
377	Smriti Mandhana	RCB	2026
372	Ellyse Perry	RCB	2025
347	Ellyse Perry	RCB	2024
345	Meg Lanning	DC	2023

- Source: ESPNcricinfo

=== Most career sixes ===
As of 30 January 2026

Sixes	Player	Team	Seasons
53	Shafali Verma	DC	2023–2026
41	Richa Ghosh	RCB	2023–2026
35	Harmanpreet Kaur	MI	2023–2026
34	Ashleigh Gardner	GG	2023–2026
33	Sophie Devine	RCB/GG	2023–2026

- Source: ESPNcricinfo

=== Most career fours ===
As of 5 February 2026

Fours	Player	Team	Seasons
205	Nat Sciver-Brunt	MI	2023–2026
179	Meg Lanning	DC/UPW	2023–2026
148	Harmanpreet Kaur	MI	2023–2026
145	Smriti Mandhana	RCB	2023–2026
132	Shafali Verma	DC	2023–2026

- Source: ESPNcricinfo

== Individual bowling records ==
=== Most career wickets ===
As of 5 February 2026

Wickets	Player	Team	Innings	Seasons
54	Amelia Kerr	MI	36	2023–2026
46	Hayley Matthews	MI	34	2023–2026
43	Sophie Ecclestone	UPW	33	2023–2026
40	Nat Sciver-Brunt	MI	36	2023–2026
38	Marizanne Kapp	DC	34	2023–2026

- Source: ESPNcricinfo

=== Best bowling figures ===
As of 16 January 2026

Figures	Player	Team	Opposition	Venue	Date
6/15	Ellyse Perry	RCB	MI	Arun Jaitley Cricket Stadium, Delhi	12 March 2024
5/15	Marizanne Kapp	DC	GG	DY Patil Stadium, Navi Mumbai	11 March 2023
5/22	Asha Sobhana	RCB	UPW	M. Chinnaswamy Stadium, Bengaluru	24 February 2024
5/23	Shreyanka Patil	RCB	GG	DY Patil Stadium, Navi Mumbai	16 January 2026
5/29	Tara Norris	DC	RCB	Brabourne Stadium, Mumbai	5 March 2023

- Source: ESPNcricinfo

=== Five-wicket hauls ===
As of January 2026, there have been 8 five-wicket hauls in WPL matches.

=== Hat-tricks ===
As of February 2026, 4 hat-tricks have been taken in WPL matches. The feat was first achieved by Issy Wong of Mumbai Indians against UP Warriorz in 2023.

List of Indian Premier League hat-tricks
No.	Player	Team	Opponents	Wickets	Venue	Date	Ref
1	Issy Wong	Mumbai Indians	UP Warriorz	Kiran Navgire; Simran Shaikh; Sophie Ecclestone	DY Patil Stadium, Navi Mumbai	24 March 2023	
2	Deepti Sharma	UP Warriorz	Delhi Capitals	Meg Lanning; Annabel Sutherland; Arundhati Reddy	Arun Jaitley Cricket Stadium, Delhi	8 March 2024	
3	Grace Harris	UP Warriorz	Delhi Capitals	Niki Prasad; Arundhati Reddy; Minnu Mani	M. Chinnaswamy Stadium, Bengaluru	22 February 2025	
4	Nandani Sharma	Delhi Capitals	Gujarat Giants	Kanika Ahuja; Rajeshwari Gayakwad; Renuka Singh Thakur	DY Patil Stadium, Navi Mumbai	11 January 2026	

=== Most wickets in a season ===
As of 5 February 2026

Wickets	Player	Team	Season
18	Amelia Kerr	MI	2025
18	Hayley Matthews	MI	2025
17	Sophie Devine	GG	2026
17	Nandani Sharma	DC	2026
16	Sophie Ecclestone	UPW	2023
16	Hayley Matthews	MI	2023
16	Nadine de Klerk	RCB	2026

- Source: ESPNcricinfo

== Individual wicket-keeping records ==
=== Most career dismissals ===
As of 5 February 2026

Dismissals	Player	Team	Innings	Catches	Stumpings	Seasons
36	Richa Ghosh	RCB	35	17	19	2023–2026
29	Yastika Bhatia	MI	28	12	17	2023–2025
15	Taniya Bhatia	DC	18	7	8	2023–2024
14	Beth Mooney	GG	27	10	4	2023–2026
10	Sarah Bryce	DC	9	6	4	2025–2025

- Source: ESPNcricinfo

=== Most dismissals in an innings ===
Dismissals	Player	Team	Opposition	Venue	Date
4	Taniya Bhatia	DC	UPW	Brabourne Stadium, Mumbai	21 March 2023
4	Gunalan Kamalini	MI	UPW	DY Patil Stadium, Navi Mumbai	17 January 2026
3	Yastika Bhatia	MI	UPW	Brabourne Stadium, Mumbai	12 March 2023
3	Richa Ghosh	RCB	UPW	DY Patil Stadium, Navi Mumbai	15 March 2023
3	Yastika Bhatia	MI	GG	M. Chinnaswamy Stadium, Bengaluru	25 February 2024
3	Alyssa Healy	UPW	GG	Arun Jaitley Cricket Stadium, Delhi	11 March 2024
3	Richa Ghosh	RCB	UPW	M. Chinnaswamy Stadium, Bengaluru	24 February 2025

- Source: ESPNcricinfo

=== Most dismissals in a season ===
As of 3 February 2026

Dismissals	Player	Team	Season
13	Yastika Bhatia	MI	2023
13	Richa Ghosh	RCB	2024
10	Taniya Bhatia	DC	2023
10	Sarah Bryce	DC	2025
9	Richa Ghosh	RCB	2023
9	Yastika Bhatia	MI	2025
9	Lizelle Lee	DC	2026

- Source: ESPNcricinfo

== Individual fielding records ==
=== Most career catches ===
As of 5 February 2026

Catches	Player	Teams	Innings	Seasons
23	Ashleigh Gardner	GG	34	2023–2026
21	Smriti Mandhana	RCB	35	2023–2026
19	Jemimah Rodrigues	DC	37	2023–2026
17	Radha Yadav	DC/RCB	28	2023–2026
17	Amelia Kerr	MI	36	2023–2026
17	Shafali Verma	DC	37	2023–2026

- Source: ESPNcricinfo

=== Most catches in an innings ===
As of 27 January 2026

Catches	Player	Team	Opposition	Venue	Date
4	Smriti Mandhana	RCB	MI	DY Patil Stadium, Navi Mumbai	21 March 2023
4	Ashleigh Gardner	GG	DC	Baroda Cricket Association Stadium, Vadodara	27 January 2026
3	Radha Yadav	DC	UPW	DY Patil Stadium, Navi Mumbai	7 March 2023
3	Anjali Sarvani	UPW	RCB	Brabourne Stadium, Mumbai	10 March 2023
3	Sajeevan Sajana	MI	UPW	Arun Jaitley Cricket Stadium, Delhi	7 March 2024
3	Phoebe Litchfield	GG	UPW	Ekana Cricket Stadium, Lucknow	3 March 2025
3	Arundhati Reddy	RCB	GG	DY Patil Stadium, Navi Mumbai	16 January 2026

- Source: ESPNcricinfo

=== Most catches in a season ===
As of 30 January 2026

Catches	Player	Team	Season
12	Ashleigh Gardner	GG	2026
7	Shabnim Ismail	MI	2025
7	Amelia Kerr	MI	2025
7	Meg Lanning	DC	2025
7	Ellyse Perry	RCB	2025
7	Jemimah Rodrigues	DC	2025
7	Smriti Mandhana	RCB	2026

- Source: ESPNcricinfo

== Individual records (other) ==
=== Most matches played ===
As of 5 February 2026

Matches	Player	Team(s)	Period
37	Amanjot Kaur	MI	2023–2026
37	Jemimah Rodrigues	DC	2023–2026
37	Shefali Verma	DC	2023–2026
36	Amelia Kerr	MI	2023–2026
36	Nat Sciver-Brunt	MI	2023–2026

- Source: ESPNcricinfo

=== Most matches played as captain ===
As of 5 February 2026

Matches	Player	Team(s)	Period
35	Harmanpreet Kaur	MI	2023–2026
35	Meg Lanning	DC/UPW	2023–2026
35	Smriti Mandhana	RCB	2023–2026
18	Ashleigh Gardner	GG	2025–2026
17	Alyssa Healy	UPW	2023–2024

- Source: ESPNcricinfo

== Partnership records ==
=== Highest partnerships by wicket ===
As of 5 February 2026

Wicket	Runs	Batters		Team	Opposition	Venue	Date
1st wicket	162	Shafali Verma	Meg Lanning	DC	RCB	Brabourne Stadium, Mumbai	5 March 2023
2nd wicket	165	Georgia Voll	Smriti Mandhana	RCB	DC	Baroda Cricket Association Stadium, Vadodara	5 February 2026
3rd wicket	106*	Nat Sciver-Brunt	Harmanpreet Kaur	MI	UPW	Brabourne Stadium, Mumbai	12 March 2023
4th wicket	93	Dayalan Hemalatha	Ashleigh Gardner	GG	UPW	Brabourne Stadium, Mumbai	20 March 2023
4th wicket	93*	Amelia Kerr	Harmanpreet Kaur	MI	GG	Arun Jaitley Cricket Stadium, Delhi	9 March 2024
5th wicket	105	Radha Yadav	Richa Ghosh	RCB	GG	DY Patil Stadium, Navi Mumbai	16 January 2026
6th wicket	109*	Deepti Sharma	Poonam Khemnar	UPW	GG	Arun Jaitley Cricket Stadium, Delhi	11 March 2024
7th wicket	70	Nikki Prasad	Sneh Rana	DC	GG	Baroda Cricket Association Stadium, Vadodara	26 January 2026
8th wicket	70*	Grace Harris	Sophie Ecclestone	UPW	GG	DY Patil Stadium, Navi Mumbai	5 March 2023
9th wicket	55	Shreyanka Patil	Richa Ghosh	RCB	MI	Baroda Cricket Association Stadium, Vadodara	26 January 2026
10th wicket	52*	Radha Yadav	Shikha Pandey	DC	MI	Brabourne Stadium, Mumbai	26 March 2023

- Source: ESPNcricinfo

=== Highest partnerships by runs ===
As of 5 February 2026

Runs	Wicket	Batters		Team	Opposition	Venue	Date
165	2nd	Smriti Mandhana	Georgia Voll	RCB	DC	Baroda Cricket Association Stadium, Vadodara	5 February 2026
162	1st	Shafali Verma	Meg Lanning	DC	RCB	Brabourne Stadium, Mumbai	5 March 2023
146*	2nd	Shafali Verma	Jess Jonassen	DC	RCB	M. Chinnaswamy Stadium, Bengaluru	1 March 2025
142	2nd	Smriti Mandhana	Georgia Voll	RCB	DC	DY Patil Stadium, Navi Mumbai	17 January 2026
140	1st	Laura Wolvaardt	Beth Mooney	GG	RCB	Arun Jaitley Cricket Stadium, Delhi	6 March 2024

- Source: ESPNcricinfo
