= List of Women's Premier League (cricket) seasons and results =

Women's Premier League (WPL)
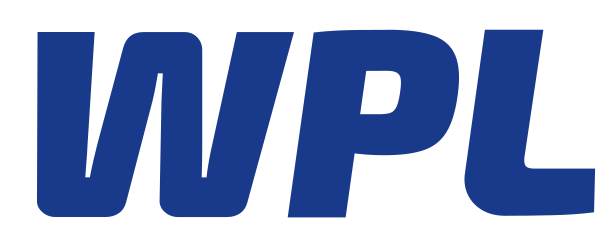
- Official WPL Logo
- Countries: India
- Administrator: WPL Governing Council, BCCI
- Format: Women's Twenty20
- First edition: 2023
- Latest edition: 2026
- Tournament format: Double round robin and Playoffs
- Number of teams: 5
- Current champion: Royal Challengers Bengaluru (RCB) (2nd title)
- Most successful: Mumbai Indians (2 titles); Royal Challengers Bengaluru (2 titles)
- Most runs: Nat Sciver-Brunt (1,348)
- Most wickets: Amelia Kerr (54)
- TV: List of broadcasters
- Website: wplt20.com

The Women's Premier League (WPL) is a domestic, annual Women's Twenty20 cricket tournament in India, organized by the WPL Governing Council, under the aegis of the Board of Control for Cricket in India (BCCI).

WPL was established in 2023 and currently consists of five teams in five cities across India. The inaugural WPL season was won by Mumbai Indians. As of 2026, there have been four seasons of the WPL tournament.

In the WPL tournament, each team plays every other team twice in a double round-robin format. At the conclusion of the double round-robin league, on the basis of aggregate points, the top three teams qualify for the playoffs. In this stage, the second and third placed teams compete with each other (in a match titled "Eliminator"), while the top placed team directly qualifies for the final match. The winner of the Eliminator match moves onto the final match. The team that wins the final match is crowned the Women's Premier League champion.

Altogether, five teams have played in the past three seasons of the WPL tournament: Delhi Capitals, Gujarat Giants, Mumbai Indians, Royal Challengers Bengaluru and UP Warriorz. Mumbai Indians and Royal Challengers Bengaluru are the most successful teams, having won 2 titles each.

== Tournament seasons and results ==
=== Overall season results ===
Season	Final				No. of teams	No. of matches	Player of the tournament
Season	Winner	Margin	Runner-up	Venue	No. of teams	No. of matches	Player of the tournament
2023	Mumbai Indians; 134/3 (19.3 overs)	Indians won by 7 wickets Scorecard	Delhi Capitals; 131/9 (20 overs)	Brabourne Stadium	5	22	Hayley Matthews
2024	Royal Challengers Bengaluru; 115/2 (19.3 overs)	Royal Challengers won by 8 wickets Scorecard	Delhi Capitals; 113 (18.3 overs)	Arun Jaitley Cricket Stadium	5	22	Deepti Sharma
2025	Mumbai Indians; 149/7 (20 Overs)	Indians won by 8 runs Scorecard	Delhi Capitals; 141/9 (20 Overs)	Brabourne Stadium	5	22	Nat Sciver-Brunt
2026	Royal Challengers Bengaluru; 204/4 (19.4 overs)	Royal Challengers won by 6 wickets Scorecard	Delhi Capitals; 203/4 (20 overs)	Baroda Cricket Association Stadium	5	22	Sophie Devine

=== Overall team results ===
Season & No. of teams	2023 (5)	2024 (5)	2025 (5)	2026 (5)
Delhi Capitals	2nd	2nd	2nd	2nd
Gujarat Giants	5th	5th	3rd	3rd
Mumbai Indians	C	3rd	C	4th
Royal Challengers Bengaluru	4th	C	4th	C
UP Warriorz	3rd	4th	5th	5th
References				

=== Additional team statistics ===
Team	Best result	Number of Titles	Appearances			
Team	Best result	Number of Titles	Seasons	First	Latest	Playoff qualifications
Mumbai Indians	1st (2023, 2025)	2	4	2023	2026	3
Royal Challengers Bengaluru	1st (2024, 2026)	2	4	2023	2026	2
Delhi Capitals	2nd (2023, 2024, 2025, 2026)	0	4	2023	2026	4
UP Warriorz	3rd (2023)	0	4	2023	2026	1
Gujarat Giants	3rd (2025, 2026)	0	4	2023	2026	2

== See also ==
- List of Women's Premier League (cricket) five-wicket hauls
- List of Women's Premier League (cricket) records and statistics
