= 2026 Women's Premier League (cricket) final =

2026 WPL cricket tournament final in India

2026 Women's Premier League Final
- Event: 2026 Women's Premier League
Delhi Capitals	Royal Challengers Bengaluru
203/4	204/4
20 overs	19.4 overs
- Royal Challengers Bengaluru won by 6 wickets
- Date: 5 February 2026
- Venue: Baroda Cricket Association Stadium, Vadodara
- Player of the match: Smriti Mandhana (Royal Challengers Bengaluru)
- Umpires: Ankita Guha and Gayathri Venugopalan

The 2026 Women's Premier League Final was a Women's Twenty20 match played at the Baroda Cricket Association Stadium in Vadodara on 5 February 2026 to determine the winner of the 2026 Women's Premier League. It was played between the table toppers of the 2026 season, Royal Challengers Bengaluru and the winner of 2026's Eliminator, Delhi Capitals. It was the second time that Delhi and Bengaluru played a WPL final against each other, after the 2024 final.

== Background ==
On 29 November 2025, the schedule for the 2026 season of the Women's Premier League was announced with matches played across two venues - Navi Mumbai and Vadodara. Navi Mumbai hosted the first round of the league stage at the DY Patil Stadium and Vadodara hosted the final round along with the playoffs at the Baroda Cricket Association Stadium.

== Road to the final ==
Royal Challengers Bengaluru
vs
Delhi Capitals
League Stage
Opponent
Scorecard
Result
Points
Match No.
Opponent
Scorecard
Result
Points
Mumbai Indians
9 January 2026
Won
2
1
Mumbai Indians
10 January 2026
Lost
0
UP Warriorz
12 January 2026
Won
4
2
Gujarat Giants
11 January 2026
Lost
0
Gujarat Giants
16 January 2026
Won
6
3
UP Warriorz
14 January 2026
Won
2
Delhi Capitals
17 January 2026
Won
8
4
Royal Challengers Bengaluru
17 January 2026
Lost
2
Gujarat Giants
19 January 2026
Won
10
5
Mumbai Indians
20 January 2026
Won
4
Delhi Capitals
24 January 2026
Lost
10
6
Royal Challengers Bengaluru
17 January 2026
Won
6
Mumbai Indians
26 January 2026
Lost
10
7
Gujarat Giants
27 January 2026
Lost
6
Gujarat Giants
29 January 2026
Won
12
8
UP Warriorz
1 February 2026
Won
8

League progression
Team	Group matches								Playoffs	
Team	1	2	3	4	5	6	7	8	E	F
Royal Challengers Bengaluru	2	4	6	8	10	10	10	12		
Delhi Capitals	0	0	2	2	4	6	6	8	W	

Win	Loss	No result

- Note: The total points at the end of each group match are listed.
- Note: Click on the points (group matches) or W/L (playoffs) to see the match summary.
Playoff stage

Eliminator

Final

1
Royal Challengers Bengaluru
204/4 (19.4 overs)

2
Gujarat Giants
168/7 (20 overs)

3
Delhi Capitals
203/4 (20 overs)

3
Delhi Capitals
169/3 (15.4 overs)

Qualified for the finals
Elimator

Opponent
Scorecard
Result
9
Gujarat Giants
3 February 2026
Won
2026 Women's Premier League final

== Match ==
=== Match officials ===
- On-field umpires: Ankita Guha and Gayathri Venugopalan
- Third umpire: Keyur Kelkar
- Reserve umpire: Bhavesh Patel
- Match referee: Varsha Nagre
- Toss: Royal Challengers Bengaluru won the toss and elected to field.

=== Summary ===
Final
5 February 2026
19:30 (N)
Scorecard

Delhi Capitals; 203/4 (20 overs)	v	Royal Challengers Bengaluru; 204/4 (19.4 overs)
Jemimah Rodrigues 57 (37); Arundhati Reddy 1/40 (4 overs)		Smriti Mandhana 87 (41); Chinelle Henry 2/34 (4 overs)

Royal Challengers Bengaluru won by 6 wickets
Baroda Cricket Association Stadium, Vadodara
Umpires: Ankita Guha and Gayathri Venugopalan
Player of the match: Smriti Mandhana (Royal Challengers Bengaluru)

- Royal Challengers Bengaluru won the toss and elected to field.
- Royal Challengers Bengaluru became WPL champions for second time.

=== Scorecard ===
Match scorecard

1st innings

Delhi Capitals batting
Player	Status	Runs	Balls	4s	6s	Strike rate
Lizelle Lee	c Harris b de Klerk	37	30	3	3	123.33
Shafali Verma	c †Ghosh b Reddy	20	13	3	0	153.84
Laura Wolvaardt	run out (Reddy/†Ghosh)	44	25	3	2	176.00
Jemimah Rodrigues	c de Klerk b Satghare	57	37	8	0	154.05
Chinelle Henry	not out	35	15	4	2	233.33
Marizanne Kapp	did not bat					
Nikki Prasad	did not bat					
Sneh Rana	did not bat					
Minnu Mani	did not bat					
Shree Charani	did not bat					
Nandani Sharma	did not bat					
Extras	(w 10)	10				
Total	(4 wickets; 20 overs)	203		21	7	RR: 10.15

Fall of wickets: 49/1 (Verma, 5.5 ov), 72/2 (Lee, 7.3 ov), 148/3 (Rodrigues, 16 ov), 203/4 (Wolvaardt, 19.6 ov)

Royal Challengers Bengaluru bowling
Bowler	Overs	Maidens	Runs	Wickets	Econ	Wides	NBs
Lauren Bell	4	0	19	0	4.75	1	0
Sayali Satghare	4	0	46	1	11.50	3	0
Arundhati Reddy	4	0	40	1	10.00	1	0
Shreyanka Patil	2	0	32	0	16.00	0	0
Nadine de Klerk	4	0	48	1	12.00	1	0
Radha Yadav	2	0	18	0	9.00	0	0

2nd innings

Royal Challengers Bengaluru batting
Player	Status	Runs	Balls	4s	6s	Strike rate
Grace Harris	b Henry	9	7	2	0	128.57
Smriti Mandhana	b Henry	87	41	12	3	212.19
Georgia Voll	c Verma b Mani	79	54	14	0	146.29
Richa Ghosh	c Mani b Sharma	6	6	1	0	100.00
Nadine de Klerk	not out	7	5	1	0	140.00
Radha Yadav	not out	12	5	2	0	240.00
Pooja Vastrakar	did not bat					
Arundhati Reddy	did not bat					
Shreyanka Patil	did not bat					
Lauren Bell	did not bat					
Sayali Satghare	did not bat					
Extras	(b 2, w 2)	4				
Total	(4 wickets; 19.4 overs)	204		32	3	RR: 10.37

Fall of wickets: 9/1 (Harris, 1.1 ov), 174/2 (Voll, 16.3 ov), 181/3 (Ghosh, 17.4 ov), 191/4 (Mandhana, 18.4 ov)

Delhi Capitals bowling
Bowler	Overs	Maidens	Runs	Wickets	Econ	Wides	NBs
Marizanne Kapp	4	0	38	0	9.50	0	0
Chinelle Henry	4	0	34	2	8.50	1	0
Nandani Sharma	4	0	41	1	10.25	0	0
Shree Charani	3.4	0	46	0	12.54	0	0
Shafali Verma	1	0	9	0	9.00	0	0
Minnu Mani	2	0	19	1	9.50	1	0
Sneh Rana	1	0	15	0	15.00	0	0
