= List of Women's Premier League (cricket) awards =

The Women's Premier League (WPL), is a women's Twenty20 cricket franchise league in India. It is owned and operated by the Board of Control for Cricket in India. The tournament honour players with several awards at the end of each season. These include the Orange Cap for the leading runs scorer and the Purple Cap for the leading wicket-taker.

== Orange Cap ==
The Orange Cap is presented to the leading run scorer in the Women's Premier League.

Season	Player	Runs	Reference
2023	Meg Lanning (DC)	346	
2024	Ellyse Perry (RCB)	347	
2025	Nat Sciver-Brunt (MI)	523	
2026	Smriti Mandhana (RCB)	377	

== Purple Cap ==
The Purple Cap is presented to the leading wicket-taker in the WPL.

Season	Player	Wickets	Reference
2023	Hayley Matthews (MI)	16	
2024	Shreyanka Patil (RCB)	13	
2025	Amelia Kerr (MI)	18	
2026	Sophie Devine (GG)	17	

== Most Sixes ==
Season	Player	Sixes	Ref
2023	Sophie Devine (RCB)	13	
2024	Shafali Verma (DC)	20	
2025	Ashleigh Gardner (GG)	18	
2026	Harmanpreet Kaur (MI)	13	

== Best Strike Rate ==
Season	Player	Strike Rate	Ref
2023	Shafali Verma (DC)	185.29	
2024	Georgia Wareham (RCB)	163.24	
2025	Chinelle Henry (UPW)	196.38	
2026	Grace Harris (RCB)	178.19	

== Most Valuable Player ==
Season	Player	Ref
2023	Hayley Matthews (MI)	
2024	Deepti Sharma (UPW)	
2025	Nat Sciver-Brunt (MI)	
2026	Sophie Devine (GG)	

== Emerging Player ==
Season	Player	Ref
2023	Yastika Bhatia (MI)	
2024	Shreyanka Patil (RCB)	
2025	Amanjot Kaur (MI)	
2026	Nandni Sharma (DC)	

== Catch of the Season ==
Season	Player	Ref
2023	Harmanpreet Kaur (MI)	
2024	Sajeevan Sajana (MI)	
2025	Annabel Sutherland (DC)	
2026	Lucy Hamilton (DC)	

== Fairplay Award ==
Season	Team	Ref
2023	Delhi Capitals; Mumbai Indians	
2024	Royal Challengers Bengaluru	
2025	Gujarat Giants	
2026	Mumbai Indians	
