= List of Women's Premier League (cricket) five-wicket hauls =

In cricket, a five-wicket haul (also known as a "five-for" or "fifer") refers to a bowler taking five or more wickets in a single innings. This is regarded as a notable achievement, especially in T20 cricket where a bowler can bowl a maximum of only 24 balls (4 overs). The Women's Premier League (WPL) is a professional women's Twenty20 cricket league in India, which has been held annually since its first season in 2023. In the four seasons played, eight five-wicket hauls have been taken by eight different bowlers. Players from four of the five teams have taken five-wicket hauls; UP Warriorz is the only franchise for which a player has not taken a five-wicket haul.

The first five-wicket haul was taken by Tara Norris of the Delhi Capitals against the Royal Challengers Bengaluru on 5 March 2023. The most economical five-wicket haul was taken by Ellyse Perry of the Royal Challengers Bengaluru, who claimed six wickets with an economy rate of 3.75 in the 2024 season. Amelia Kerr of the Mumbai Indians took the least economical five-wicket haul (5/38) bowling with an economy rate of 9.50 in 2025 season. Till date, nobody has taken multiple five-wicket hauls in the WPL.

The best bowling figures in a WPL match was taken by Ellyse Perry of Royal Challengers Bengaluru who returned figures of 6/15 at the Arun Jaitley Cricket Stadium, New Delhi in 2024 season. No other bowler has taken a six-wicket haul in WPL.

The first part of this list includes all the five-wicket hauls taken in the WPL in chronological order. The second part of the list provides an overview of five-wicket hauls by WPL seasons, and the third part provides an overview of five-wicket hauls by WPL teams.

== Key ==
Symbol	Meaning
†	The bowler was man of the match
Date	Day on which the match was held
Inns	Innings in which the five-wicket haul was taken
Ov.	Number of overs bowled
Runs	Number of runs conceded
Wkts	Number of wickets taken
Econ	Runs conceded per over
Result	Result for the bowler's team
Ref.	Citations for the record

== Five-wicket hauls ==
- Source: ESPNcricinfo
- Last updated: 11 January 2026

No.	Bowler	Date	Ground	Team	Opponent	Inns	Ov.	Runs	Wkts	Econ	Result	Ref.
1	Tara Norris †	5 March 2023	Brabourne Stadium	Delhi Capitals	Royal Challengers Bengaluru	2	4	29	5	7.25	Won	
2	Kim Garth	5 March 2023	DY Patil Stadium	Gujarat Giants	UP Warriorz	2	4	36	5	9.00	Lost	
3	Marizanne Kapp †	11 March 2023	DY Patil Stadium	Delhi Capitals	Gujarat Giants	1	4	15	5	3.75	Won	
4	Asha Sobhana †	24 February 2024	M. Chinnaswamy Stadium	Royal Challengers Bengaluru	UP Warriorz	2	4	22	5	5.50	Won	
5	Ellyse Perry †	12 March 2024	Arun Jaitley Cricket Stadium	Royal Challengers Bengaluru	Mumbai Indians	1	4	15	6	3.75	Won	
6	Amelia Kerr	6 March 2025	Ekana Cricket Stadium	Mumbai Indians	UP Warriorz	1	4	38	5	9.50	Won	
7	Nandani Sharma	11 January 2026	DY Patil Stadium	Delhi Capitals	Gujarat Giants	1	4	33	5	8.25	Lost	
8	Shreyanka Patil †	16 January 2026	DY Patil Stadium	Royal Challengers Bengaluru	Gujarat Giants	2	3.5	23	5	6.00	Won	

== Season overview ==
Following is an overview of five-wicket hauls by WPL seasons.

Year	No. of 5WI	BBI	Bowler	Team
2023	3	5/15	Marizanne Kapp	Delhi Capitals
2024	2	6/15	Ellyse Perry	Royal Challengers Bengaluru
2025	1	5/38	Amelia Kerr	Mumbai Indians
2026	2	5/23	Shreyanka Patil	Royal Challengers Bengaluru

== Team overview ==
Following is an overview of five-wicket hauls by WPL teams.

Team	No. of 5WI	BBI	Bowler
Delhi Capitals	3	5/15	Marizanne Kapp
Gujarat Giants	1	5/36	Kim Garth
Mumbai Indians	1	5/38	Amelia Kerr
Royal Challengers Bengaluru	3	6/15	Ellyse Perry
UP Warriorz	0	4/13	Sophie Ecclestone

== See also ==
- List of Women's Premier League (cricket) seasons and results
