= Cricinfo Awards =

Annual cricket awards

- Awarded for: The best individual performances in International cricket and T20 Leagues over the previous calendar year.
- Presented by: Cricinfo
- First award: 19 December 2007
- Website: Cricinfo

The Cricinfo Awards (formerly known as ESPNcricinfo Awards) are an annual set of sports awards for international cricket and T20 leagues around the world, which recognise and honour the best individual batting and bowling performances in cricket over the previous calendar year. The awards were introduced by Cricinfo in 2007.

== Men's awards ==
=== Men's Test batting performance of the year ===
Year	Player	Performance	Venue
2007	(Sri Lanka) Kumar Sangakkara	192 v Australia	Hobart
2008	(India) Virender Sehwag	201* v Sri Lanka	Galle
2009	(India) Virender Sehwag	293 v Sri Lanka	Mumbai
2010	(India) VVS Laxman	96 v South Africa	Durban
2011	(India) Sachin Tendulkar	146 v South Africa	Cape Town
2012	(England) Kevin Pietersen	186 v India	Mumbai
2013	(India) Shikhar Dhawan	187 v Australia	Mohali
2014	(New Zealand) Brendon McCullum	302 v India	Wellington
2015	(New Zealand) Kane Williamson	242* v Sri Lanka	Wellington
2016	(England) Ben Stokes	258 v South Africa	Cape Town
2017	(Australia) Steve Smith	109 v India	Pune
2018	(India) Cheteshwar Pujara	123 v Australia	Adelaide
2019	(Sri Lanka) Kusal Perera	153* v South Africa	Durban
2020	(India) Ajinkya Rahane	112 v Australia	Melbourne
2021	(India) Rishabh Pant	89* v Australia	Brisbane
2022	(England) Jonny Bairstow	136* v New Zealand	Nottingham
2023	(Australia) Travis Head	163 v India	London
2024	(England) Ollie Pope	196 v India	Hyderabad

=== Men's Test bowling performance of the year ===
Year	Player	Performance	Venue
2007	(India) Zaheer Khan	5/75 v England	Trent Bridge
2008	(South Africa) Dale Steyn	5/67 v Australia	Melbourne
2009	(Cricket West Indies) Jerome Taylor	5/11 v England	Kingston
2010	(South Africa) Dale Steyn	7/51 v India	Nagpur
2011	(New Zealand) Doug Bracewell	6/40 v Australia	Hobart
2012	(South Africa) Vernon Philander	5/30 v England	London
2013	(Australia) Mitchell Johnson	7/40 v England	Adelaide
2014	(Australia) Mitchell Johnson	7/68 v South Africa	Centurion
2015	(England) Stuart Broad	8/15 v Australia	Nottingham
2016	(England) Stuart Broad	6/17 v South Africa	Johannesburg
2017	(Australia) Nathan Lyon	8/50 v India	Bengaluru
2018	(India) Jasprit Bumrah	6/33 v Australia	Melbourne
2019	(Cricket West Indies) Kemar Roach	5/17 v England	Bridgetown
2020	(Australia) Josh Hazlewood	5/8 v India	Adelaide
2021	(New Zealand) Kyle Jamieson	5/31 v India	Southampton
2022	(Bangladesh) Ebadot Hossain	6/46 v New Zealand	Mount Maunganui
2023	(Australia) Nathan Lyon	8/64 v India	Indore
2024	(Cricket West Indies) Shamar Joseph	7/68 v Australia	Brisbane

=== Men's ODI batting performance of the year ===
Year	Player	Performance	Venue
2007	(Australia) Adam Gilchrist	149 v Sri Lanka	Bridgetown
2008	(Sri Lanka) Sanath Jayasuriya	125 v India	Karachi
2009	(India) Sachin Tendulkar	175 v Australia	Hyderabad
2010	(India) Sachin Tendulkar	200* v South Africa	Gwalior
2011	(Ireland) Kevin O'Brien	113 v England	Bengaluru
2012	(India) Virat Kohli	133* v Sri Lanka	Hobart
2013	(India) Rohit Sharma	209 v Australia	Bengaluru
2014	(India) Rohit Sharma	264 v Sri Lanka	Kolkata
2015	(South Africa) AB de Villiers	149 v West Indies	Johannesburg
2016	(South Africa) Quinton de Kock	178 v Australia	Centurion
2017	(Pakistan) Fakhar Zaman	114 v India	London
2018	(New Zealand) Ross Taylor	181* v England	Dunedin
2019	(England) Ben Stokes	84* v New Zealand	London
2020	(Australia) Glenn Maxwell	108 v England	Manchester
2021	(Pakistan) Fakhar Zaman	193 v South Africa	Johannesburg
2022	(Bangladesh) Mehedy Hasan Miraz	100* v India	Mirpur
2023	(Australia) Glenn Maxwell	201* v Afghanistan	Mumbai
2024	(Australia) Travis Head	154* v England	Trent Bridge

=== Men's ODI bowling performance of the year ===
Year	Player	Performance	Venue
2007	(Sri Lanka) Lasith Malinga	4/54 v South Africa	Providence
2008	(Sri Lanka) Ajantha Mendis	6/13 v India	Karachi
2009	(Pakistan) Shahid Afridi	6/38 v Australia	Dubai
2010	(Pakistan) Umar Gul	6/42 v England	London
2011	(Australia) Mitchell Johnson	6/31 v Sri Lanka	Pallekele
2012	(Sri Lanka) Thisara Perera	6/44 v Pakistan	Pallekele
2013	(Pakistan) Shahid Afridi	7/12 v West Indies	Georgetown
2014	(Sri Lanka) Lasith Malinga	5/56 v Pakistan	Mirpur
2015	(New Zealand) Tim Southee	7/33 v England	Wellington
2016	(Cricket West Indies) Sunil Narine	6/27 v South Africa	Providence
2017	(Pakistan) Mohammad Amir	3/16 v India	London
2018	(India) Kuldeep Yadav	6/25 v England	Nottingham
2019	(New Zealand) Matt Henry	3/37 v India	Manchester
2020	(Zimbabwe) Blessing Muzarabani	5/49 v Pakistan	Rawalpindi
2021	(England) Saqib Mahmood	4/42 v Pakistan	Cardiff
2022	(India) Jasprit Bumrah	6/19 v England	London
2023	(India) Mohammed Shami	7/57 v New Zealand	Mumbai
2024	(Sri Lanka) Jeffrey Vandersay	6/33 v India	Colombo

=== Men's T20I batting performance of the year ===
Year	Player	Performance	Venue
2007	(India) Yuvraj Singh	70 v Australia	Durban
2008	N/A		
2009	(Cricket West Indies) Chris Gayle	88 v Australia	London
2010	(Australia) Michael Hussey	60* v Pakistan	Gros Islet
2011	N/A		
2012	(Cricket West Indies) Marlon Samuels	78 v Sri Lanka	Colombo
2013	N/A		
2014	(England) Alex Hales	116* v Sri Lanka	Chittagong
2015	(India) Rohit Sharma	106 v South Africa	Dharamshala
2016	(Cricket West Indies) Carlos Brathwaite	34* v England	Kolkata
2017	(Cricket West Indies) Evin Lewis	125 v India	Kingston
2018	(Australia) Glenn Maxwell	103* v England	Hobart
2019	(Australia) Glenn Maxwell	113* v India	Bengaluru
2020	(England) Jonny Bairstow	86* v South Africa	Cape Town
2021	(England) Jos Buttler	101* v Sri Lanka	Dubai
2022	(India) Suryakumar Yadav	111* v New Zealand	Mount Maunganui
2023	(India) Suryakumar Yadav	112* v Sri Lanka	Rajkot
2024	(India) Rohit Sharma	92 v Australia	Gros Islet

=== Men's T20I bowling performance of the year ===
Year	Player	Performance	Venue
2007	(India) RP Singh	4/13 v South Africa	Durban
2008	N/A		
2009	(Pakistan) Umar Gul	5/6 v New Zealand	London
2010	(New Zealand) Tim Southee	5/18 v Pakistan	Auckland
2011	N/A		
2012	(Sri Lanka) Lasith Malinga	5/31 v England	Pallekele
2013	N/A		
2014	(Sri Lanka) Rangana Herath	5/3 v New Zealand	Chittagong
2015	(South Africa) David Wiese	5/23 v West Indies	Durban
2016	(Bangladesh) Mustafizur Rahman	5/22 v New Zealand	Kolkata
2017	(India) Yuzvendra Chahal	6/25 v England	Bengaluru
2018	(India) Kuldeep Yadav	5/24 v England	London
2019	(Sri Lanka) Lasith Malinga	5/6 v New Zealand	Pallekele
2020	(New Zealand) Lockie Ferguson	5/21 v West Indies	Auckland
2021	(Pakistan) Shaheen Afridi	3/31 v India	Dubai
2022	(England) Sam Curran	3/12 v Pakistan	Melbourne
2023	(Cricket West Indies) Alzarri Joseph	5/40 v South Africa	Johannesburg
2024	(India) Jasprit Bumrah	2/18 v v South Africa	Bridgetown

=== Men's Associate batting performance of the year ===
Year	Player	Performance	Venue
2016	(Afghanistan) Mohammad Shahzad	118* v Zimbabwe	Sharjah
2017	(Scotland) Kyle Coetzer	109 v Zimbabwe	Edinburgh
2018	(Scotland) Calum MacLeod	140* v England	Edinburgh
2019	(Scotland) George Munsey	127* v Netherlands	Dublin
2020	N/A		
2021	(Namibia) Gerhard Erasmus	53* v Ireland	Sharjah
2022	(Scotland) George Munsey	66* v West Indies	Hobart
2023	(Netherlands) Bas de Leede	123 v Scotland	Bulawayo
2024	(United States) Aaron Jones	94 vs Canada	Dallas

=== Men's Associate bowling performance of the year ===
Year	Player	Performance	Venue
2016	(Afghanistan) Mohammad Nabi	2/16 v Bangladesh	Mirpur
2017	(Afghanistan) Rashid Khan	7/18 v West Indies	Gros Islet
2018	(Scotland) Safyaan Sharif	5/33 v Zimbabwe	Bulawayo
2019	(Oman) Bilal Khan	4/23 v Hong Kong	Dubai
2020	N/A		
2021	(Namibia) Ruben Trumpelmann	3/17 v Scotland	Abu Dhabi
2022	(Netherlands) Brandon Glover	3/9 v South Africa	Adelaide
2023	(Scotland) Brandon McMullen	5/34 v Ireland	Bulawayo
2024	(United States) Saurabh Netravalkar	2/18 v Pakistan	Dallas

=== Men's Debutant of the year ===
Year	Player
2013	(India) Mohammed Shami
2014	N/A
2015	(Bangladesh) Mustafizur Rahman
2016	(Bangladesh) Mehidy Hasan Miraz
2017	(India) Kuldeep Yadav
2018	(England) Sam Curran
2019	(England) Jofra Archer
2020	(New Zealand) Kyle Jamieson
2021	(England) Ollie Robinson
2022	(England) Harry Brook
2023	(South Africa) Gerald Coetzee
2024	(Cricket West Indies) Shamar Joseph

== Women's awards ==
=== Women's batting performance of the year ===
Year	Player	Performance	Venue
2016	(Cricket West Indies) Hayley Matthews	66 v Australia	Kolkata
2017	(India) Harmanpreet Kaur	171* v Australia	Derby
2018	(India) Harmanpreet Kaur	103 v New Zealand	Providence
2019	(Australia) Meg Lanning	133* v England	Chelmsford
2020	(Australia) Alyssa Healy	75 v India	Melbourne
2021	(Australia) Beth Mooney	125* v India	Mackay

=== Women's bowling performance of the year ===
Year	Player	Performance	Venue
2016	(New Zealand) Leigh Kasperek	3/13 v Australia	Nagpur
2017	(England) Anya Shrubsole	6/46 v India	London
2018	(England) Natalie Sciver	3/4 v South Africa	Gros Islet
2019	(Australia) Ellyse Perry	7/22 v England	Canterbury
2020	(India) Poonam Yadav	4/19 v Australia	Sydney
2021	(England) Kate Cross	5/34 v India	Taunton

=== Women's ODI batting performance of the year ===
Year	Player	Performance	Venue
2022	(Australia) Alyssa Healy	170 v England	Christchurch
2023	(Sri Lanka) Chamari Athapaththu	140* v New Zealand	Galle
2024	(Sri Lanka) Chamari Athapaththu	195* v South Africa	Potchefstroom

=== Women's ODI Bowling performance of the year ===
Year	Player	Performance	Venue
2022	(England) Sophie Ecclestone	6/36 v South Africa	Christchurch
2023	(Bangladesh) Marufa Akter	4/29 v India	Mirpur
2024	(South Africa) Marizanne Kapp	3/12 v Australia	North Sydney

=== Women's T20I batting performance of the year ===
Year	Player	Performance	Venue
2022	(India) Smriti Mandhana	61 v England	Birmingham
2023	(Cricket West Indies) Hayley Matthews	132 v Australia	Sydney
2024	(South Africa) Anneke Bosch	74* v Australia	Dubai

=== Women's T20I bowling performance of the year ===
Year	Player	Performance	Venue
2022	(India) Renuka Singh	4/18 v Australia	Birmingham
2023	(South Africa) Ayabonga Khaka	4/29 v England	Cape Town
2024	(New Zealand) Amelia Kerr	3/24 v South Africa	Dubai

=== Women's Debutant of the year ===
Year	Player
2024	(Australia) Georgia Voll

== Mixed awards ==
=== Captain of the Year ===
Year	Winner
2015	(New Zealand) Brendon McCullum
2016	(India) Virat Kohli
2017	(England) Heather Knight
2018	(Australia) Meg Lanning
2019	(England) Eoin Morgan
2020	N/A
2021	(New Zealand) Kane Williamson
2022	(England) Ben Stokes
2023	(Australia) Pat Cummins
2024	(Australia) Pat Cummins (M)
2024	(New Zealand) Sophie Devine (W)

== Other awards ==
=== Men's T20 leagues batting performance of the year ===
Year	Player	Team	Performance
2022	(India) Rajat Patidar	(India) Royal Challengers Bangalore	112* v (India) Lucknow Super Giants
2023	(Cricket West Indies) Nicholas Pooran	(United States) MI New York	137* v (United States) Seattle Orcas
2024	(Australia) Josh Brown	(Australia) Brisbane Heat	140 v (Australia) Adelaide Strikers

=== Men's T20 leagues bowling performance of the year ===
Year	Player	Team	Performance
2022	(India) Umran Malik	(India) Sunrisers Hyderabad	5/25 v (India) Gujarat Titans
2023	(India) Yuzvendra Chahal	(India) Rajasthan Royals	4/29 v (India) Sunrisers Hyderabad
2024	(India) Jasprit Bumrah	(India) Mumbai Indians	6/25 v (India) Royal Challengers Bangaluru

=== Women's T20 leagues batting performance of the year ===
Year	Player	Team	Performance
2023	(Australia) Grace Harris	(Australia) Brisbane Heat	136* v (Australia) Perth Scorcher
2024	(South Africa) Lizelle Lee	(Australia) Hobart Hurricanes	150* v (Australia) Perth Scorchers

=== Women's T20 leagues bowling performance of the year ===
Year	Player	Team	Performance
2023	(Australia) Amanda-Jade Wellington	(Australia) Adelaide Strikers	3/16 v (Australia) Brisbane Heat
2024	(Australia) Ellyse Perry	(India) Royal Challengers Bengaluru	6/15 v (India) Mumbai Indians

== Special awards ==
The Cricinfo jury nominates a list of players for a special award segment separately. It's based on overall performance of the players during a specific time period. The Indian cricketer Sachin Tendulkar has been awarded twice: Cricketer of the Generation in 2014, and the Greatest Batsman of the 21st Century in 2026.

=== 2010 ===
Cricketer of the Decade (2000–2009): Ricky Ponting (Australia)

=== 2014 ===
Cricketer of the Generation (1993–2013): Sachin Tendulkar (India)

=== 2026 ===
21st Century Greatest Cricketer (2000–2025)

- Greatest Batsman: Sachin Tendulkar (India)
- Greatest Bowler: Muttiah Muralitharan (Sri Lanka)
- Greatest All-rounder: Jacques Kallis (South Africa)
- Greatest Women's Cricketer: Ellyse Perry (Australia)
