= India women's cricket team in Bangladesh in 2024 =

International cricket tour

	Bangladesh	India
- Dates: 28 April – 9 May 2024
Captains	Nigar Sultana	Harmanpreet Kaur

Twenty20 International series
- Results: India won the 5-match series 5–0
Most runs	Nigar Sultana (93)	Smriti Mandhana (116)
Most wickets	Rabeya Khan (8)	Radha Yadav (10)
- Player of the series: Radha Yadav (Ind)

The India women's cricket team toured Bangladesh in April and May 2024 to play five Twenty20 International (T20I) matches. The T20I series formed part of both teams' preparation ahead of the 2024 Asia Cup and 2024 ICC Women's T20 World Cup tournaments. In April 2024, Bangladesh Cricket Board (BCB) confirmed the fixtures for the tour. India had last toured Bangladesh in 2023.

India won the first T20I by 44 runs and the rain-hit second T20I by 19 runs via the Duckworth-Lewis-Stern (DLS) method. In the third T20I, India chased down Bangladesh's target of 117 runs and sealed the series 3–0. The fourth T20I was interrupted due to rain and the match was reduced to 14 overs per side; India set a target of 125 runs and won the match by 56 runs via the DLS method. India won the fifth T20I by 21 runs, taking the series 5–0.

== Squads ==
Bangladesh	India
Nigar Sultana (c, wk); Nahida Akter (vc); Dilara Akter; Marufa Akter; Shorna Akter; Rubya Haider; Habiba Islam; Rabeya Khan; Fahima Khatun; Murshida Khatun; Shorifa Khatun; Sultana Khatun; Ritu Moni; Sobhana Mostary; Fariha Trisna	Harmanpreet Kaur (c); Smriti Mandhana (vc); Yastika Bhatia (wk); Richa Ghosh (wk); Dayalan Hemalatha; Saika Ishaque; Amanjot Kaur; Shreyanka Patil; Titas Sadhu; Sajeevan Sajana; Deepti Sharma; Renuka Singh; Asha Sobhana; Shafali Verma; Pooja Vastrakar; Radha Yadav

Sumaiya Akter and Nishita Akter Nishi were named as reserves in Bangladesh's squad.

== T20I series ==
=== 1st T20I ===
28 April 2024
16:00 (D/N)
Scorecard

India; 145/7 (20 overs)	v	Bangladesh; 101/8 (20 overs)
Yastika Bhatia 36 (29); Rabeya Khan 3/23 (4 overs)		Nigar Sultana 51 (48); Renuka Singh 3/18 (4 overs)

India won by 44 runs
Sylhet International Cricket Stadium, Sylhet
Umpires: Morshed Ali Khan (Ban) and Shathira Jakir (Ban)
Player of the match: Renuka Singh (Ind)

- India won the toss and elected to bat.
- Sajeevan Sajana (Ind) made her T20I debut.

=== 2nd T20I ===
30 April 2024
16:00 (D/N)
Scorecard

Bangladesh; 119 (20 overs)	v	India; 47/1 (5.2 overs)
Murshida Khatun 46 (49); Radha Yadav 3/19 (4 overs)		Dayalan Hemalatha 41* (24); Marufa Akter 1/11 (2.2 overs)

India won by 19 runs (DLS method)
Sylhet International Cricket Stadium, Sylhet
Umpires: Morshed Ali Khan (Ban) and Shathira Jakir (Ban)
Player of the match: Dayalan Hemalatha (Ind)

- Bangladesh won the toss and elected to bat.
- No further play was possible due to rain.

=== 3rd T20I ===
2 May 2024
16:00 (D/N)
Scorecard

Bangladesh; 117/8 (20 overs)	v	India; 121/3 (18.3 overs)
Dilara Akter 39 (27); Radha Yadav 2/22 (4 overs)		Shafali Verma 51 (38); Ritu Moni 1/10 (2 overs)

India won by 7 wickets
Sylhet International Cricket Stadium, Sylhet
Umpires: Ali Arman (Ban) and Sajidul Islam (Ban)
Player of the match: Shafali Verma (Ind)

- India won the toss and elected to field.
- Smriti Mandhana and Shafali Verma became the first Indian pair to complete 2,000 runs partnership in women's T20I.

=== 4th T20I ===
6 May 2024
16:00 (D/N)
Scorecard

India; 122/6 (14 overs)	v	Bangladesh; 68/7 (14 overs)
Harmanpreet Kaur 39 (26); Marufa Akter 2/24 (3 overs)		Dilara Akter 21 (25); Deepti Sharma 2/13 (3 overs)

India won by 56 runs (DLS method)
Sylhet International Cricket Stadium, Sylhet
Umpires: Ali Arman (Ban) and Shathira Jakir (Ban)
Player of the match: Harmanpreet Kaur (Ind)

- Bangladesh won the toss and elected to field.
- Bangladesh were set a revised target of 125 runs from 14 overs due to rain.
- Habiba Islam (Ban) and Asha Sobhana (Ind) both made their T20I debuts.
- Harmanpreet Kaur became the second women's cricketer to play 300 international matches for India.

=== 5th T20I ===
9 May 2024
16:00 (D/N)
Scorecard

India; 156/5 (20 overs)	v	Bangladesh; 135/6 (20 overs)
Dayalan Hemalatha 37 (28); Nahida Akter 2/27 (4 overs)		Ritu Moni 37 (33); Radha Yadav 3/24 (4 overs)

India won by 21 runs
Sylhet International Cricket Stadium, Sylhet
Umpires: Ali Arman (Ban) and Sajidul Islam (Ban)
Player of the match: Radha Yadav (Ind)

- India won the toss and elected to bat.
- Shafali Verma (Ind) played in her 100th international match.
- Smriti Mandhana became the second Indian female cricketer to hit 100 sixes in international cricket.
