= Georgia Voll =

Australian cricketer (born 2003)

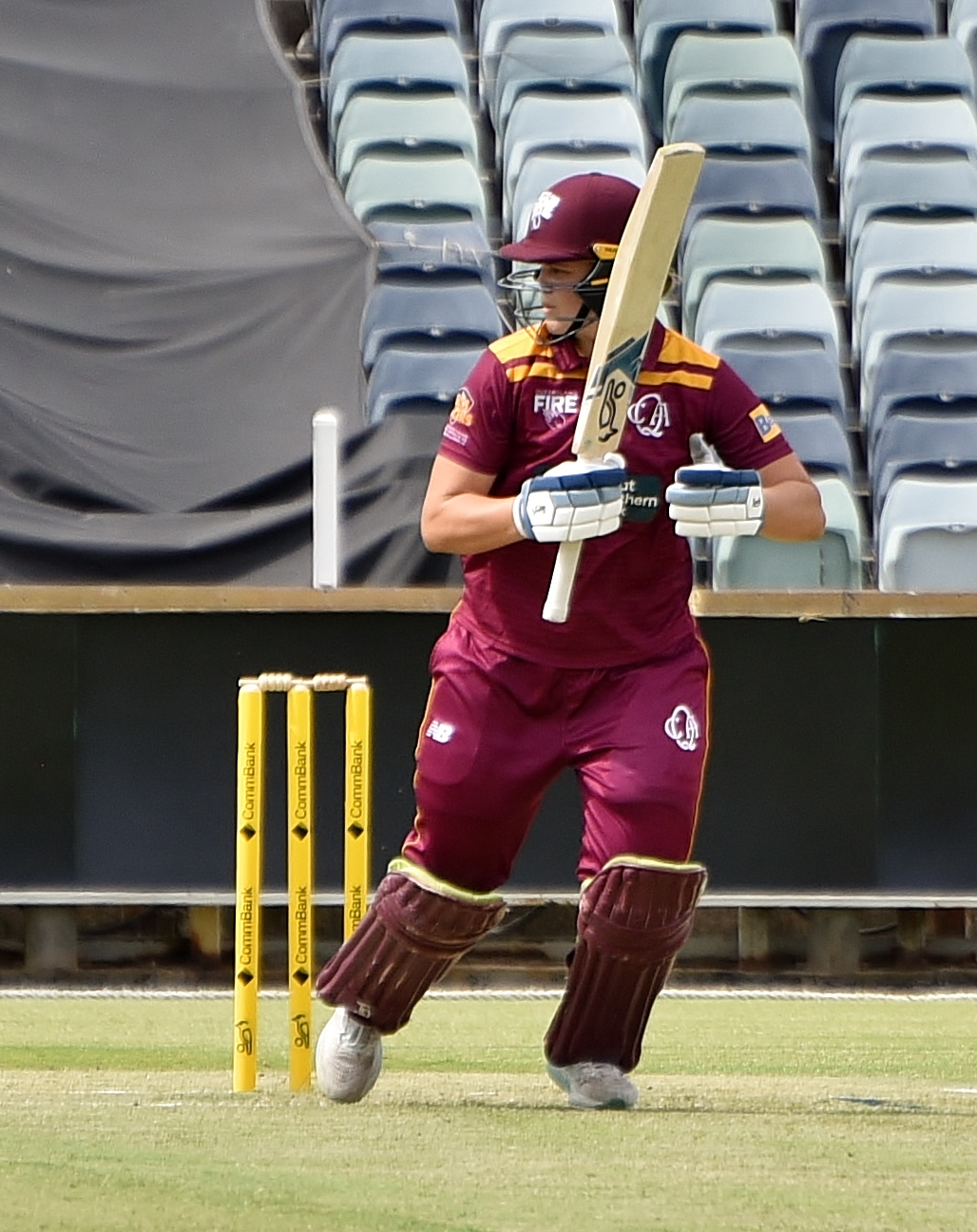
- Voll in 2022

Personal information
- Born: 5 August 2003 (age 23); Toowoomba, Queensland, Australia
- Batting: Right-handed
- Bowling: Right-arm off break
- Role: Top-order batter

International information
- National side: Australia (2024–present)
- Test debut (cap 185): 30 January 2025 v England
- Last Test: 6 March 2026 v India
- ODI debut (cap 150): 5 December 2024 v India
- Last ODI: 25 October 2025 v South Africa
- ODI shirt no.: 13
- T20I debut (cap 61): 20 January 2025 v England
- Last T20I: 5 July 2025 v England

Domestic team information
- Years: Team
- 2019/20–present: Queensland
- 2020/21–2023/24: Brisbane Heat
- 2024: North West Thunder
- 2024/25–present: Sydney Thunder
- 2025: UP Warriorz
- 2025: Birmingham Phoenix
- 2026: Royal Challengers Bengaluru (squad no. 65)
- 2026: Welsh Fire

Career statistics
Competition	WODI	WT20I	WTest
Matches	13	19	2
Runs scored	549	604	30
Batting average	49.90	33.55	15
100s/50s	2/2	1/3	0/0
Top score	101	101	16*
Balls bowled	–	6	–
Wickets	–	0	–
Bowling average	–	–	–
5 wickets in innings	–	–	–
10 wickets in match	–	–	–
Best bowling	–	–	–
Catches/stumpings	13/–	8/–	2/–
Medal record
Women's cricket
Representing Australia
ICC T20 World Cup
Winner	2026 England & Wales
- Source: ESPNcricinfo, 5 July 2026

Georgia Voll (born 5 August 2003) is an Australian cricketer who plays as a right-handed batter and occasional right-arm off break bowler for the Queensland Fire in the Women's National Cricket League (WNCL) and the Sydney Thunder in the Women's Big Bash League (WBBL). Voll made her debut for the Queensland Fire in February 2020. She made her WBBL debut for the Brisbane Heat in the 2020–21 tournament. Voll has also played rugby league, and was selected in the Queensland Academy of Sport Under-18 female squad for the 2019 season.

== Franchise career ==
=== Women's Premier League ===
Voll joined the Women's Premier League in 2025 season when she was signed by UP Warriorz as a mid-season replacement player for Sri Lankan captain Chamari Athapaththu, joining the squad for an amount of ₹30 lakh (US$32,000). She made her debut for Warriorz against Gujarat Giant by scoring a 3-ball duck. In the next match she proved herself by scoring a maiden half-century in WPL against Mumbai Indians. Voll's most vital performance came during the 2025 season in a match against the Royal Challengers Bengaluru when scored a powerful knock of 99* of 56-balls, leading Warriorz to post the tournament's highest-ever total at the time, helped secure a victory and also earned her the Player of the Match award. In her three matches played during the season, Voll amassed 154 runs at an impressive average of 77 and a strike rate of 167, including two half-centuries.

In the 2026 WPL mega-auction, she was sold to Bengaluru based franchise, Royal Challengers Bengaluru for ₹60 lakh (US$64,000). She made her debut for Challengers against Delhi Capitals scoring a brilliant unbeaten knock of 54 runs off 42-balls leading the team to an 8-wicket victory. She got the start but couldn't capitalise in her rest season before scoring a decisive knock of 79 runs of 54-balls against Capitals in the final leading the team to their 2nd title in their history. Voll ended her season scoring 170 runs in six matches, including two half-centuries with averaging 34.

=== The Hundred ===
Voll joined The Hundred in 2025 season after she was picked by Birmingham Phoenix in the draft for £65,000 salary cap. Voll played and opened in all scheduled eight league matches but couldn't make an impact for Phoenix in the season as she could only contribute 111 runs at a poor average of 13.88 and her highest score being 29. Voll's inconsistent form resulted Phoenix finishing 7th on the points table.

Voll is set to play for Welsh Fire in the 2026 The Hundred season via direct signing.

== International career ==
In January 2022, Voll was named in Australia's A squad for their series against England A, with the matches being played alongside the Women's Ashes.

In November 2024, Voll named in Australia squad for the series against India. She made her One Day International (ODI) debut for Australia against India at Allan Border Field in Brisbane on 5 December 2024 in the first of a three-match series between the two teams. Three days later at the same venue in the second contest of the series, she scored her maiden ODI century, compiling 101 from 87 balls.

She was named in the Australia squad for the 2025 Women's Ashes series. She made her Twenty20 International (T20I) debut against England at Sydney Cricket Ground in Sydney on 20 January 2025.

=== International centuries ===
One Day International centuries
Runs	Opponents	Venue	Year
101	India	Allan Border Field, Brisbane, Australia	2024
101	India	Bellerive Oval, Hobart, Australia	2026

Twenty20 International centuries
Runs	Opponents	Venue	Year
101	West Indies	Arnos Vale Stadium, Arnos Vale, Saint Vincent and the Grenadines	2026

== Honours ==
Brisbane Heat

- Women's Big Bash League runner-up: 2023–24

Royal Challengers Bengaluru

- Women's Premier League: 2026

Australia

- Women's T20 World Cup: 2026

Individual

- ICC Women's Player of the Month: March 2025
- ESPNcricinfo Women's Debutant of the year: 2024
