= 2026 Women's Premier League (cricket) =

Fourth edition of the Women's Premier League

- Dates: 9 January – 5 February 2026
- Administrator: Board of Control for Cricket in India
- Cricket format: Twenty20 cricket
- Tournament format(s): Double Round robin and playoffs
- Champions: Royal Challengers Bengaluru (2nd title)
- Runners-up: Delhi Capitals
- Participants: 5
- Matches: 22
- Player of the series: (New Zealand) Sophie Devine (Gujarat Giants)
- Most runs: (India) Smriti Mandhana (Royal Challengers Bengaluru) (377)
- Most wickets: (New Zealand) Sophie Devine (Gujarat Giants) (17) (India) Nandani Sharma (Delhi Capitals) (17)
- Official website: wplt20.com

The 2026 Women's Premier League (also known as WPL 2026) was the fourth season of the Women's Premier League, a women's franchise Twenty20 cricket league organised by the Board of Control for Cricket in India (BCCI). The tournament, featuring five teams, took place from 9 January to 5 February 2026.

A mega auction for the season was held on 27 November 2025 in New Delhi. Additional reports confirmed the auction date and other details, including venues and streaming information.

In the final, Royal Challengers Bangalore defeated Delhi Capitals by 6 wickets to win their second title.

== Teams and venues ==
Teams
- Delhi Capitals; Gujarat Giants; Mumbai Indians; Royal Challengers Bengaluru; UP Warriorz

The tournament was played across Mumbai and Baroda, with the DY Patil Stadium in Navi Mumbai hosting the opening match and the Baroda Cricket Association Stadium in Baroda hosting the later stages, including the final.

Navi Mumbai	Vadodara
DY Patil Stadium	Baroda Cricket Association Stadium
Capacity: 45,300	Capacity: 40,000

== Personnel changes ==
A player mega-auction for the season took place on 27 November 2025 in New Delhi.

Personnel changes

Name	National side	Team	Price
Chinelle Henry	West Indies	Delhi Capitals	₹1.3 crore (US$130,000)
Shree Charani	India	Delhi Capitals	₹1.3 crore (US$130,000)
Laura Wolvaardt	South Africa	Delhi Capitals	₹1.1 crore (US$110,000)
Sneh Rana	India	Delhi Capitals	₹50 lakh (US$52,000)
Minnu Mani	India	Delhi Capitals	₹40 lakh (US$42,000)
Lizelle Lee	South Africa	Delhi Capitals	₹30 lakh (US$31,000)
Taniya Bhatia	India	Delhi Capitals	₹30 lakh (US$31,000)
Nandni Sharma	India	Delhi Capitals	₹20 lakh (US$21,000)
Deeya Yadav	India	Delhi Capitals	₹10 lakh (US$10,000)
Mamatha Madiwala	India	Delhi Capitals	₹10 lakh (US$10,000)
Lucy Hamilton	Australia	Delhi Capitals	₹10 lakh (US$10,000)
Sophie Devine	New Zealand	Gujarat Giants	₹2 crore (US$210,000)
Georgia Wareham	Australia	Gujarat Giants	₹1 crore (US$100,000)
Bharti Fulmali	India	Gujarat Giants	₹70 lakh (US$73,000)
Kashvee Gautam	India	Gujarat Giants	₹65 lakh (US$67,000)
Renuka Singh	India	Gujarat Giants	₹60 lakh (US$62,000)
Kim Garth	Australia	Gujarat Giants	₹50 lakh (US$52,000)
Yastika Bhatia	India	Gujarat Giants	₹50 lakh (US$52,000)
Danni Wyatt-Hodge	England	Gujarat Giants	₹50 lakh (US$52,000)
Tanuja Kanwar	India	Gujarat Giants	₹45 lakh (US$47,000)
Anushka Sharma	India	Gujarat Giants	₹45 lakh (US$47,000)
Rajeshwari Gayakwad	India	Gujarat Giants	₹40 lakh (US$42,000)
Titas Sadhu	India	Gujarat Giants	₹30 lakh (US$31,000)
Kanika Ahuja	India	Gujarat Giants	₹30 lakh (US$31,000)
Ayushi Soni	India	Gujarat Giants	₹30 lakh (US$31,000)
Happy Kumari	India	Gujarat Giants	₹10 lakh (US$10,000)
Shivani Singh	India	Gujarat Giants	₹10 lakh (US$10,000)
Amelia Kerr	New Zealand	Mumbai Indians	₹3 crore (US$310,000)
Sajeevan Sajana	India	Mumbai Indians	₹75 lakh (US$78,000)
Shabnim Ismail	South Africa	Mumbai Indians	₹60 lakh (US$62,000)
Nicola Carey	Australia	Mumbai Indians	₹30 lakh (US$31,000)
Saika Ishaque	India	Mumbai Indians	₹30 lakh (US$31,000)
Sanskriti Gupta	India	Mumbai Indians	₹20 lakh (US$21,000)
Triveni Vasistha	India	Mumbai Indians	₹20 lakh (US$21,000)
Rahila Firdous	India	Mumbai Indians	₹10 lakh (US$10,000)
Poonam Khemnar	India	Mumbai Indians	₹10 lakh (US$10,000)
Nalla Reddy	India	Mumbai Indians	₹10 lakh (US$10,000)
Milly Illingworth	Australia	Mumbai Indians	₹10 lakh (US$10,000)
Lauren Bell	England	Royal Challengers Bengaluru	₹90 lakh (US$93,000)
Pooja Vastrakar	India	Royal Challengers Bengaluru	₹85 lakh (US$88,000)
Arundhati Reddy	India	Royal Challengers Bengaluru	₹75 lakh (US$78,000)
Grace Harris	Australia	Royal Challengers Bengaluru	₹75 lakh (US$78,000)
Nadine de Klerk	South Africa	Royal Challengers Bengaluru	₹65 lakh (US$67,000)
Radha Yadav	India	Royal Challengers Bengaluru	₹65 lakh (US$67,000)
Georgia Voll	Australia	Royal Challengers Bengaluru	₹60 lakh (US$62,000)
Linsey Smith	England	Royal Challengers Bengaluru	₹30 lakh (US$31,000)
Dayalan Hemalatha	India	Royal Challengers Bengaluru	₹30 lakh (US$31,000)
Prema Rawat	India	Royal Challengers Bengaluru	₹20 lakh (US$21,000)
Gautami Naik	India	Royal Challengers Bengaluru	₹10 lakh (US$10,000)
Prathyoosha Kumar	India	Royal Challengers Bengaluru	₹10 lakh (US$10,000)
Deepti Sharma	India	UP Warriorz	₹3.2 crore (US$330,000)
Shikha Pandey	India	UP Warriorz	₹2.4 crore (US$250,000)
Meg Lanning	Australia	UP Warriorz	₹1.9 crore (US$200,000)
Phoebe Litchfield	Australia	UP Warriorz	₹1.2 crore (US$120,000)
Asha Sobhana	India	UP Warriorz	₹1.1 crore (US$110,000)
Sophie Ecclestone	England	UP Warriorz	₹85 lakh (US$88,000)
Deandra Dottin	West Indies	UP Warriorz	₹80 lakh (US$83,000)
Kiran Navgire	India	UP Warriorz	₹60 lakh (US$62,000)
Harleen Deol	India	UP Warriorz	₹50 lakh (US$52,000)
Kranti Gaud	India	UP Warriorz	₹50 lakh (US$52,000)
Pratika Rawal	India	UP Warriorz	₹50 lakh (US$52,000)
Chloe Tryon	South Africa	UP Warriorz	₹30 lakh (US$31,000)
Shipra Giri	India	UP Warriorz	₹10 lakh (US$10,000)
Simran Shaikh	India	UP Warriorz	₹10 lakh (US$10,000)
Tara Norris	United States	UP Warriorz	₹10 lakh (US$10,000)
Suman Meena	India	UP Warriorz	₹10 lakh (US$10,000)
Gongadi Trisha	India	UP Warriorz	₹10 lakh (US$10,000)

== Standing ==
=== Points table ===
Pos	Team	Pld	W	L	Pts	NRR	Qualification
1	Royal Challengers Bengaluru (C)	8	6	2	12	1.247	Advanced to the Final
2	Gujarat Giants (3rd)	8	5	3	10	−0.168	Advanced to the Eliminator
3	Delhi Capitals (R)	8	4	4	8	−0.055	Advanced to the Eliminator
4	Mumbai Indians	8	3	5	6	0.059	
5	UP Warriorz	8	2	6	4	−1.076	

Source: ESPNcricinfo
(C) Champions; (R) Runners-up

=== Match summary ===
Team	Group matches								Playoffs	
Team	1	2	3	4	5	6	7	8	E	F
Delhi Capitals	0	0	2	2	4	6	6	8	W	L
Gujarat Giants	2	4	4	4	4	6	8	10	L	
Mumbai Indians	0	2	4	4	4	4	6	6		
Royal Challengers Bengaluru	2	4	6	8	10	10	10	12		W
UP Warriorz	0	0	0	2	4	4	4	4		

Win	Loss	No result

- Note: The total points at the end of each group match are listed.
- Note: Click on the points (group matches) or W/L (playoffs) to see the match summary.

Visitor team →	DC	GG	MI	RCB	UPW
Home team ↓	DC	GG	MI	RCB	UPW
Delhi Capitals		Gujarat; 4 runs	Delhi; 7 wickets	Bengaluru; 8 wickets	Delhi; 5 wickets
Gujarat Giants	Gujarat; 3 runs		Gujarat; 11 runs	Bengaluru; 61 runs	Gujarat; 45 runs
Mumbai Indians	Mumbai; 50 runs	Mumbai; 7 wickets		Bengaluru; 3 wickets	Lucknow; 7 wickets
Royal Challengers Bengaluru	Delhi; 7 wickets	Bengaluru; 32 runs	Mumbai; 15 runs		Bengaluru; 9 wickets
UP Warriorz	Delhi; 7 wickets	Gujarat; 10 runs	Lucknow; 22 runs	Bengaluru; 8 wickets	

Home team won	Visitor team won

- Note: Results listed are according to the home (horizontal) and visitor (vertical) teams.
- Note: Click on a result to see a summary of the match.

== Fixtures ==
The fixtures were announced on 29 November 2025.

Match 1
9 January
19:30 (N)
Scorecard

Mumbai Indians; 154/6 (20 overs)	v	Royal Challengers Bengaluru; 157/7 (20 overs)
Sajeevan Sajana 45 (25); Nadine de Klerk 4/26 (4 overs)		Nadine de Klerk 63* (44); Amelia Kerr 2/13 (4 overs)

Royal Challengers Bengaluru won by 3 wickets
DY Patil Stadium, Navi Mumbai
Umpires: Narayanan Janani and Bhavesh Patel
Player of the match: Nadine de Klerk (Royal Challengers Bengaluru)

- Royal Challengers Bengaluru won the toss and elected to field.

Match 2
10 January
15:30
Scorecard

Gujarat Giants; 207/4 (20 overs)	v	UP Warriorz; 197/8 (20 overs)
Ashleigh Gardner 65 (41); Sophie Ecclestone 2/32 (4 overs)		Phoebe Litchfield 78 (40); Renuka Singh 2/25 (4 overs)

Gujarat Giants won by 10 runs
DY Patil Stadium, Navi Mumbai
Umpires: Kaushik Gandhi and Gayathri Venugopalan
Player of the match: Georgia Wareham (Gujarat Giants)

- UP Warriorz won the toss and elected to field.

Match 3
10 January
19:30 (N)
Scorecard

Mumbai Indians; 195/4 (20 overs)	v	Delhi Capitals; 145 (19 overs)
Harmanpreet Kaur 74* (42); Nandani Sharma 2/26 (3 overs)		Chinelle Henry 56 (33); Amelia Kerr 3/24 (4 overs)

Mumbai Indians won by 50 runs
DY Patil Stadium, Navi Mumbai
Umpires: Kaushik Gandhi and Keyur Kelkar
Player of the match: Harmanpreet Kaur (Mumbai Indians)

- Delhi Capitals won the toss and elected to field.

Match 4
11 January
19:30 (N)
Scorecard

Gujarat Giants; 209 (20 overs)	v	Delhi Capitals; 205/5 (20 overs)
Sophie Devine 95 (42); Nandani Sharma 5/33 (4 overs)		Lizelle Lee 86 (54); Sophie Devine 2/21 (3 overs)

Gujarat Giants won by 4 runs
DY Patil Stadium, Navi Mumbai
Umpires: Keyur Kelkar and Bhavesh Patel
Player of the match: Sophie Devine (Gujarat Giants)

- Delhi Capitals won the toss and elected to field.

Match 5
12 January
19:30 (N)
Scorecard

UP Warriorz; 143/5 (20 overs)	v	Royal Challengers Bengaluru; 145/1 (12.1 overs)
Deepti Sharma 45* (35); Nadine de Klerk 2/28 (4 overs)		Grace Harris 85 (40); Shikha Pandey 1/28 (3 overs)

Royal Challengers Bengaluru won by 9 wickets
DY Patil Stadium, Navi Mumbai
Umpires: Gayathri Venugopalan and Bhavesh Patel
Player of the match: Grace Harris (Royal Challengers Bengaluru)

- Royal Challengers Bengaluru won the toss and elected to field.

Match 6
13 January
19:30 (N)
Scorecard

Gujarat Giants; 192/5 (20 overs)	v	Mumbai Indians; 193/3 (19.2 overs)
Georgia Wareham 43* (33); Shabnim Ismail 1/25 (4 overs)		Harmanpreet Kaur 71* (43); Sophie Devine 1/29 (3.2 overs)

Mumbai Indians won by 7 wickets
DY Patil Stadium, Navi Mumbai
Umpires: Narayanan Janani and Gayathri Venugopalan
Player of the match: Harmanpreet Kaur (Mumbai Indians)

- Mumbai Indians won the toss and elected to field.

Match 7
14 January
19:30 (N)
Scorecard

UP Warriorz; 154/8 (20 overs)	v	Delhi Capitals; 158/3 (20 overs)
Meg Lanning 54 (38); Shafali Verma 2/16 (4 overs)		Lizelle Lee 67 (44); Deepti Sharma 2/26 (3 overs)

Delhi Capitals won by 7 wickets
DY Patil Stadium, Navi Mumbai
Umpires: Kaushik Gandhi and Narayanan Janani
Player of the match: Shafali Verma (Delhi Capitals)

- Delhi Capitals won the toss and elected to field.

Match 8
15 January
19:30 (N)
Scorecard

Mumbai Indians; 161/5 (20 overs)	v	UP Warriorz; 162/3 (18.1 overs)
Nat Sciver-Brunt 65 (43); Shikha Pandey 1/25 (4 overs)		Harleen Deol 64* (39); Nat Sciver-Brunt 2/28 (3 overs)

UP Warriorz won by 7 wickets
DY Patil Stadium, Navi Mumbai
Umpires: Kaushik Gandhi and Keyur Kelkar
Player of the match: Harleen Deol (UP Warriorz)

- UP Warriorz won the toss and elected to field.

Match 9
16 January
19:30 (N)
Scorecard

Royal Challengers Bengaluru; 182/7 (20 overs)	v	Gujarat Giants; 150 (18.5 overs)
Radha Yadav 66 (47); Sophie Devine 3/31 (4 overs)		Bharti Fulmali 39 (20); Shreyanka Patil 5/23 (3.5 overs)

Royal Challengers Bengaluru won by 32 runs
DY Patil Stadium, Navi Mumbai
Umpires: Ankita Guha and Vrinda Rathi
Player of the match: Radha Yadav (Royal Challengers Bengaluru)

- Gujarat Giants won the toss and elected to field.

Match 10
17 January
15:30
Scorecard

UP Warriorz; 187/8 (20 overs)	v	Mumbai Indians; 165/6 (20 overs)
Meg Lanning 70 (45); Amelia Kerr 3/28 (4 overs)		Amelia Kerr 49* (28); Shikha Pandey 2/30 (4 overs)

UP Warriorz won by 22 runs
DY Patil Stadium, Navi Mumbai
Umpires: Keyur Kelkar and Gayathri Venugopalan
Player of the match: Meg Lanning (UP Warriorz)

- Mumbai Indians won the toss and elected to field.

Match 11
17 January
19:30 (N)
Scorecard

Delhi Capitals; 166 (20 overs)	v	Royal Challengers Bengaluru; 169/2 (18.2 overs)
Shafali Verma 62 (41); Lauren Bell 3/26 (4 overs)		Smriti Mandhana 96 (61); Marizanne Kapp 1/21 (4 overs)

Royal Challengers Bengaluru won by 8 wickets
DY Patil Stadium, Navi Mumbai
Umpires: Narayanan Janani and Bhavesh Patel
Player of the match: Smriti Mandhana (Royal Challengers Bengaluru)

- Royal Challengers Bengaluru won the toss and elected to field.

Match 12
19 January
19:30 (N)
Scorecard

Royal Challengers Bengaluru; 178/6 (20 overs)	v	Gujarat Giants; 117/8 (20 overs)
Gautami Naik 73 (55); Kashvee Gautam 2/38 (4 overs)		Ashleigh Gardner 54 (43); Sayali Satghare 3/21 (4 overs)

Royal Challengers Bengaluru won by 61 runs
Baroda Cricket Association Stadium, Vadodara
Umpires: Ankita Guha and Anish Sahasrabudhe
Player of the match: Gautami Naik (Royal Challengers Bengaluru)

- Gujarat Giants won the toss and elected to field.

Match 13
20 January
19:30 (N)
Scorecard

Mumbai Indians; 154/5 (20 overs)	v	Delhi Capitals; 155/3 (19 overs)
Nat Sciver-Brunt 65* (45); Shree Charani 3/33 (4 overs)		Jemimah Rodrigues 51* (37); Vaishnavi Sharma 1/20 (4 overs)

Delhi Capitals won by 7 wickets
Baroda Cricket Association Stadium, Vadodara
Umpires: Tony Emmatty and Vrinda Rathi
Player of the match: Jemimah Rodrigues (Delhi Capitals)

- Delhi Capitals won the toss and elected to field.

Match 14
22 January
19:30 (N)
Scorecard

Gujarat Giants; 153/8 (20 overs)	v	UP Warriorz; 108 (17.3 overs)
Sophie Devine 50* (42); Kranti Gaud 2/18 (4 overs)		Phoebe Litchfield 32 (27); Rajeshwari Gayakwad 3/16 (4 overs)

Gujarat Giants won by 45 runs
Baroda Cricket Association Stadium, Vadodara
Umpires: Ajitesh Argal and Tony Emmatty
Player of the match: Rajeshwari Gayakwad (Gujarat Giants)

- UP Warriorz won the toss and elected to field.

Match 15
24 January
19:30 (N)
Scorecard

Royal Challengers Bengaluru; 109 (20 overs)	v	Delhi Capitals; 111/3 (15.4 overs)
Smriti Mandhana 38 (34); Nandani Sharma 3/26 (4 overs)		Laura Wolvaardt 42* (38); Sayali Satghare 2/18 (3 overs)

Delhi Capitals won by 7 wickets
Baroda Cricket Association Stadium, Vadodara
Umpires: Ajitesh Argal and Ankita Guha
Player of the match: Marizanne Kapp (Delhi Capitals)

- Delhi Capitals won the toss and elected to field.

Match 16
26 January
19:30 (N)
Scorecard

Mumbai Indians; 199/4 (20 overs)	v	Royal Challengers Bengaluru; 184/9 (20 overs)
Nat Sciver-Brunt 100* (57); Lauren Bell 2/21 (4 overs)		Richa Ghosh 90 (50); Hayley Matthews 3/10 (2 overs)

Mumbai Indians won by 15 runs
Baroda Cricket Association Stadium, Vadodara
Umpires: Vrinda Rathi and Anish Sahasrabudhe
Player of the match: Nat Sciver-Brunt (Mumbai Indians)

- Royal Challengers Bengaluru won the toss and elected to field.
- Nat Sciver-Brunt scored the first century in WPL history.

Match 17
27 January
19:30 (N)
Scorecard

Gujarat Giants; 174/9 (20 overs)	v	Delhi Capitals; 171/8 (20 overs)
Beth Mooney 58 (46); Shree Charani 4/31 (4 overs)		Niki Prasad 47 (24); Sophie Devine 4/37 (4 overs)

Gujarat Giants won by 3 runs
Baroda Cricket Association Stadium, Vadodara
Umpires: Ajitesh Argal and Anish Sahasrabudhe
Player of the match: Sophie Devine (Gujarat Giants)

- Delhi Capitals won the toss and elected to field.

Match 18
29 January
19:30 (N)
Scorecard

UP Warriorz; 143/8 (20 overs)	v	Royal Challengers Bengaluru; 147/2 (13.1 overs)
Deepti Sharma 55 (43); Nadine de Klerk 4/22 (4 overs)		Grace Harris 75 (37); Asha Sobhana 1/24 (2 overs)

Royal Challengers Bengaluru won by 8 wickets
Baroda Cricket Association Stadium, Vadodara
Umpires: Ajitesh Argal and Anish Sahasrabudhe
Player of the match: Grace Harris (Royal Challengers Bengaluru)

- Royal Challengers Bengaluru won the toss and elected to field.
- Royal Challengers Bengaluru qualified for the final as a result of this match.

Match 19
30 January
19:30 (N)
Scorecard

Gujarat Giants; 167/4 (20 overs)	v	Mumbai Indians; 156/7 (20 overs)
Ashleigh Gardner 46 (28); Amelia Kerr 2/26 (4 overs)		Harmanpreet Kaur 82* (48); Sophie Devine 2/23 (4 overs)

Gujarat Giants won by 11 runs
Baroda Cricket Association Stadium, Vadodara
Umpires: Tony Emmatty and Ankita Guha
Player of the match: Georgia Wareham (Gujarat Giants)

- Gujarat Giants won the toss and elected to bat.
- Gujarat Giants qualified for the Eliminator as a result of this match.

Match 20
1 February
19:30 (N)
Scorecard

UP Warriorz; 122/8 (20 overs)	v	Delhi Capitals; 126/5 (18.4 overs)
Deepti Sharma 24 (19); Marizanne Kapp 3/30 (4 overs)		Laura Wolvaardt 47 (36); Deepti Sharma 2/27 (3.4 overs)

Delhi Capitals won by 5 wickets
Baroda Cricket Association Stadium, Vadodara
Umpires: Tony Emmatty and Vrinda Rathi
Player of the match: Marizanne Kapp (Delhi Capitals)

- Delhi Capitals won the toss and elected to field.
- Delhi Capitals qualified to the Eliminator as a result of this match.

== Playoffs ==
=== Bracket ===
Eliminator

Final

1
Royal Challengers Bengaluru
204/4 (19.4 overs)

2
Gujarat Giants
168/7 (20 overs)

3
Delhi Capitals
203/4 (20 overs)

3
Delhi Capitals
169/3 (15.4 overs)

=== Eliminator ===
Eliminator
3 February 2026
19:30 (N)
Scorecard

Gujarat Giants; 168/7 (20 overs)	v	Delhi Capitals; 169/3 (15.4 overs)
Beth Mooney 62* (51); Chinelle Henry 3/35 (4 overs)		Lizelle Lee 43 (24); Georgia Wareham 2/28 (3.4 overs)

Delhi Capitals won by 7 wickets
Baroda Cricket Association Stadium, Vadodara
Umpires: Ankita Guha and Bhavesh Patel
Player of the match: Jemimah Rodrigues (Delhi Capitals)

- Delhi Capitals won the toss and elected to field.
- Delhi Capitals qualified for the final as a result of this match.

=== Final ===
Final
5 February 2026
19:30 (N)
Scorecard

Delhi Capitals; 203/4 (20 overs)	v	Royal Challengers Bengaluru; 204/4 (19.4 overs)
Jemimah Rodrigues 57 (37); Arundhati Reddy 1/40 (4 overs)		Smriti Mandhana 87 (41); Chinelle Henry 2/34 (4 overs)

Royal Challengers Bengaluru won by 6 wickets
Baroda Cricket Association Stadium, Vadodara
Umpires: Ankita Guha and Gayathri Venugopalan
Player of the match: Smriti Mandhana (Royal Challengers Bengaluru)

- Royal Challengers Bengaluru won the toss and elected to field.
- Royal Challengers Bengaluru became WPL champions for second time.

== Broadcasting ==
Star Sports Network retained the broadcasting rights for the Women's Premier League (WPL 2026). Meanwhile, JioHotstar exclusively livestreamed the tournament matches on the website and the app.

== Statistics ==
Most runs
Runs	Player	Team
377	Smriti Mandhana	Royal Challengers Bengaluru
342	Harmanpreet Kaur	Mumbai Indians
321	Nat Sciver-Brunt	Mumbai Indians
320	Lizelle Lee	Delhi Capitals
317	Laura Wolvaardt	Delhi Capitals

- Source: ESPNcricinfo

Most wickets
Wickets	Player	Team
17	Sophie Devine	Gujarat Giants
17	Nandani Sharma	Delhi Capitals
16	Nadine de Klerk	Royal Challengers Bengaluru
14	Amelia Kerr	Mumbai Indians
14	Shree Charani	Delhi Capitals
14	Chinelle Henry	Delhi Capitals

- Source: ESPNcricinfo
