= Asha Sobhana =

Indian cricketer

Personal information
- Full name: Asha Sobhana Joy
- Born: 16 March 1991 (age 35); Thiruvananthapuram, Kerala, India
- Batting: Right-handed
- Bowling: Right-arm leg break
- Role: All-rounder

International information
- National side: India (2024–present)
- ODI debut (cap 143): 16 June 2024 v South Africa
- Last ODI: 19 June 2024 v South Africa
- T20I debut (cap 82): 6 May 2024 v Bangladesh
- Last T20I: 9 May 2024 v Bangladesh
- T20I shirt no.: 4

Domestic team information
- Years: Team
- 2006/07–2018/19, 2024/25–present: Kerala
- 2013/14–2021/22: Railways
- 2022/23–2023/24: Pondicherry
- 2023–2025: Royal Challengers Bengaluru
- 2026–Present: UP Warriorz
Medal record
Representing India
Women's Cricket
Women's Asia Cup
Runner-up	2024 Sri Lanka
- Source: ESPNcricinfo, 3 April 2024

Asha Sobhana (born 16 March 1991) is an Indian cricketer who plays for Kerala women's cricket team in domestic cricket and for UP Warriorz in the Women's Premier League. She is an all-rounder, who is a right-handed batter and a leg break bowler.

== Early years ==
Born in Thiruvananthapuram, Kerala, she found interest in cricket while studying at Cotton Hill Girls Higher Secondary School. Sobhana's cricket journey started when she went for her first district cricket trials and got selected for the district cricket team at the age of 12. She was mentored by former Kerala captain Shabina Jacob in her early career. Although initially she was a pace bowler, once she was bowling leg spin and was then advised by her coach to become a leg spinner. When she was 15 years old, Kerala Cricket Association sent her to train at the MAC Spin Foundation.

== Domestic career ==
Sobhana made her List A debut for Kerala on 28 November 2006, against Karnataka in the 2006–07 Senior Women's One Day League. She made her first-class debut for Kerala on 10 September 2007, against Hyderabad in the 2007–08 Inter State Women's Competition. She made her Twenty20 debut for Kerala on 3 December 2009, against Tamil Nadu in the 2008–09 Women's Senior T20 Trophy. She joined the Railways cricket team in 2011 and represented the team for ten years.

In 2022, she left the Railways team and moved to Puducherry to do commentary for a men's T20 tournament. Eventually, she was named as the captain of the Puducherry team for the 2021–22 Women's Senior T20 Trophy. In February 2024, she was signed by the Royal Challengers Bangalore at a price of ₹10 lakh to play for them in the 2023 Women's Premier League.

She was the leading wicket-taker for Puducherry in the 2023–24 Women's Senior One Day Trophy, picking up 16 wickets in seven matches. She was also the only player to score more than 200 runs and take more than 10 wickets in that tournament. On 24 February 2024, she took five wickets for 26 runs, helping RCB to beat UP Warriorz by 2 runs, during the 2024 Women's Premier League. With this, she became the first Indian player to take a five-wicket haul in the Women's Premier League. She remained as the second highest wicket-taker of the season, claiming 12 wickets in ten matches.

== International career ==
In April 2024, Sobhana earned her maiden call-up to the India women's cricket team for their tour to Bangladesh. She made her Twenty20 International (T20I) debut in the fourth match of same series on 6 May 2024. In May 2024, she was named in India's One Day International squad for the series against South Africa. She made her ODI debut on 16 June 2024, against South Africa. She was named in the India squad for the 2024 ICC Women's T20 World Cup.
