= Sajeevan Sajana =

Indian cricketer (born 1995)

Sajana Sajeevan
Personal information
- Born: 4 January 1995 (age 31); Mananthavady, Wayanad, Kerala, India
- Batting: Right-handed
- Bowling: Right-arm off-break
- Role: All-rounder

International information
- National side: India (2024–present)
- T20I debut (cap 81): 28 April 2024 v Bangladesh
- Last T20I: 9 May 2024 v Bangladesh
- T20I shirt no.: 44

Domestic team information
- Years: Team
- 2011/12–present: Kerala
- 2024–present: Mumbai Indians

Career statistics
Competition	WT20I	WLA	WT20
Matches	5	78	94
Runs scored	20	1,306	1,194
Batting average	10.00	23.32	20.58
100s/50s	0/0	1/5	0/1
Top score	11	100	60
Balls bowled	12	3,342	1,351
Wickets	0	89	60
Bowling average	–	18.16	18.08
5 wickets in innings	–	0	0
10 wickets in match	–	0	0
Best bowling	–	4/11	4/10
Catches/stumpings	1/–	34/–	33/–
Medal record
Representing India
Women's Cricket
Women's Asia Cup
Runner-up	2024 Sri Lanka
- Source: ESPNcricinfo, 10 June 2024

Sajeevan Sajana (born 4 January 1995) is an Indian cricketer who plays for India women's cricket team as an all-rounder, who is a right-handed batter and a right-arm off-break bowler. She plays for Kerala women's cricket team in domestic cricket and for Mumbai Indians in the Women's Premier League. She also played first-class cricket for South Zone.

== Early life ==
She was born in Mananthavady, Wayanad, Kerala. Her father, Sanjeevan, was an auto-rickshaw driver in a town in Kerala. Her mother, Sarada, worked at the municipality in Mananthavady. She first represented Kerala at the under-23 level, where she led her team to the Twenty-20 Super League title in 2019. She has a degree in political science. She was featured in a Tamil film as a support artist. She was football captain of Wayanad district in Kerala in her teenage years, and a track-and-field champion in college.

== Domestic career ==
Sajana made her List A debut for Kerala on 9 November 2012, against Andhra in the 2012–13 Senior Women's One Day League. She made her Twenty20 debut for Kerala on 18 December 2011, against Andhra in the 2011–12 Senior Women's T20 League. She made her first-class debut for South Zone on 1 March 2017, against West Zone in the 2016–17 Senior Women's Cricket Inter Zonal Three Day Game.

In December 2023, she was signed by Mumbai Indians at a price of ₹15 lakh to play for them in the Women's Premier League auction, for the 2024 season. On 23 February 2024, she hit a last ball six, helping her side to beat Delhi Capitals by 4 wickets.

== International career ==
In April 2024, she earned her maiden call-up for the national squad for the T20I series against Bangladesh. She made her Twenty20 International (T20I) debut against Bangladesh on 28 April 2024. In May 2024, she was named in the T20I squad for the series against South Africa. She was also named in the India squad for the 2024 ICC Women's T20 World Cup.
