= Nandani Sharma =

Indian cricketer

Personal information
- Full name: Nandani Shyam Sunder Sharma
- Born: 20 September 2001 (age 25); Chandigarh, India
- Batting: Right-handed
- Bowling: Right-arm fast-medium
- Role: Bowler

International information
- National side: India

Domestic team information
- Years: Team
- Chandigarh
- 2026–present: Delhi Capitals

Career statistics
Competition	WT20I	WPL
Matches	6	10
Runs scored	0	1
Batting average	–	0.50
100s/50s	0/0	0/0
Top score	0*	1
Balls bowled	115	228
Wickets	7	17
Bowling average	24.71	18.58
5 wickets in innings	0	1
10 wickets in match	0	0
Best bowling	3/34	5/33
Catches/stumpings	2/–	1/–
Medal record
Women's cricket
Representing India
Asian Games
Gold medal – first place	Aichi–Nagoya 2026
ACC Asia Cup
Winner	2026 UAE
- Source: Cricinfo, 29 June 2026

Nandani Shyam Sunder Sharma (born 20 September 2001) is an Indian cricketer. Sharma is a right-handed batter who bowls right-arm fast-medium. She was born in Chandigarh.

Sharma plays domestic cricket for Chandigarh. In the 2024–25 domestic season, she took 11 wickets in six matches in the Senior Women's One-Day Trophy, a return that helped put her into Women's Premier League contention. Ahead of the 2026 Women's Premier League, she was signed by Delhi Capitals for ₹20 lakh.

Sharma made an immediate impact in the Women's Premier League. In January 2026, playing for Delhi Capitals against Gujarat Giants, she took 5 wickets for 33 runs, including a hat-trick in the final over of the innings. Her final over brought four wickets, the first such instance in the Women's Premier League. She finished the season with 17 wickets in 10 innings and was named the Emerging Player of the Season.

In May 2026, Sharma was named in India's squad for the 2026 ICC Women's T20 World Cup and the preceding T20I series against England. She made her Women's Twenty20 International debut against England at Chelmsford on 28 May 2026, taking 3 wickets for 34 runs. Later that month, she said that the Women's Premier League had helped her learn how to handle pressure and approach situations differently.
