= Arundhati Reddy =

Indian cricketer (born 1997)

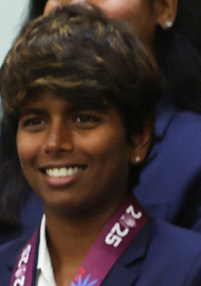
- Reddy in 2025

Personal information
- Born: 10 April 1997 (age 29); Hyderabad, Telangana, India
- Batting: Right-handed
- Bowling: Right-arm medium-fast
- Role: Bowler

International information
- National side: India (2018–present)
- ODI debut (cap 144): 19 June 2024 v South Africa
- Last ODI: 20 September 2025 v Australia
- T20I debut (cap 59): 19 September 2018 v Sri Lanka
- Last T20I: 21 June 2026 v South Africa
- T20I shirt no.: 20

Domestic team information
- Years: Team
- 2009/10–2016/17: Hyderabad
- 2017/18–present: Railways
- 2019–2020: Supernovas
- 2022: Trailblazers
- 2023–2025: Delhi Capitals
- 2026–present: Royal Challengers Bengaluru

Career statistics
Competition	WODI	WT20I
Matches	11	42
Runs scored	58	110
Batting average	9.66	8.46
100s/50s	0/0	0/0
Top score	14	27*
Balls bowled	548	815
Wickets	15	37
Bowling average	32.66	28.37
5 wickets in innings	0	0
10 wickets in match	0	0
Best bowling	4/26	3/19
Catches/stumpings	11/–	14/–
Medal record
Women's cricket
Representing India
ICC Cricket World Cup
Winner	2025 India
Asian Games
Gold medal – first place	2026 Aichi–Nagoya
ACC Asia Cup
Winner	2026 UAE
Runner-up	2024 Sri Lanka
- Source: Cricinfo, 9 January 2026

Arundhati Reddy (born 10 April 1997) is an Indian cricketer who plays for the Indian women's national team as a right-arm medium-fast bowler. She represents Railways in domestic cricket and Royal Challengers Bengaluru in the Women's Premier League. Reddy was part of the Indian team that won the 2025 World Cup, 2026 Asia Cup, and gold medal at the 2026 Asian Games.

== Career ==
In August 2018, Reddy was named in the India Women's squad for their series against the Sri Lanka Women. She made her Women's Twenty20 International cricket debut against Sri Lanka Women on 19 September 2018.

In October 2018, she was named in India's squad for the 2018 ICC Women's World Twenty20 tournament in the West Indies. In January 2020, she was named in India's squad for the 2020 ICC Women's T20 World Cup in Australia.

In May 2021, she was named in India's Test squad for their one-off match against the England women's cricket team.

She was named in the India squad for the 2024 ICC Women's T20 World Cup and their home ODI series against New Zealand in October 2024. She is also member of women's odi world cup winning squad of 2025.
