= Smriti Mandhana =

Indian cricketer (born 1996)

Smriti Shriniwas Mandhana
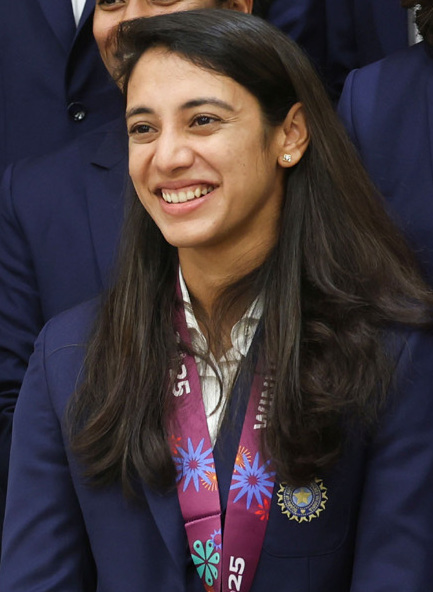
- Mandhana in 2025

Personal information
- Born: 18 July 1996 (age 30); Mumbai, Maharashtra, India
- Batting: Left-handed
- Bowling: Right-arm medium
- Role: Opening batter

International information
- National side: India (2013–Present)
- Test debut (cap 76): 13 August 2014 v England
- Last Test: 10 July 2026 v England
- ODI debut (cap 106): 10 April 2013 v Bangladesh
- Last ODI: 28 October 2026 v Zimbabwe
- T20I debut (cap 40): 5 April 2013 v Bangladesh
- Last T20I: 20 October 2026 v Zimbabwe

Domestic team information
- Years: Team
- 2010–present: Maharashtra
- 2016/17: Brisbane Heat
- 2018–2019: Western Storm
- 2018/19: Hobart Hurricanes
- 2019–2022: Trailblazers
- 2021–2024: Southern Brave
- 2021/22: Sydney Thunder
- 2023–present: Royal Challengers Bengaluru
- 2024/25: Adelaide Strikers
- 2026: Manchester Super Giants

Career statistics
Competition	WTest	WODI	WT20I
Matches	9	123	182
Runs scored	788	5,443	4,923
Batting average	52.53	47.33	31.15
100s/50s	2/5	14/35	2/37
Top score	149	136	124
Balls bowled	12	36	–
Wickets	0	1	–
Bowling average	–	47.00	–
5 wickets in innings	–	0	–
10 wickets in match	–	0	–
Best bowling	–	1/13	–
Catches/stumpings	3/–	43/–	49/–
Medal record
Women's cricket
Representing India
ICC Cricket World Cup
Winner	2025 India
Runner-up	2017 England & Wales
ICC T20 World Cup
Runner-up	2020 Australia
Commonwealth Games
Silver medal – second place	2022 Birmingham
Asian Games
Gold medal – first place	2022 Hangzhou
Gold medal – first place	2026 Aichi–Nagoya
ACC Asia Cup
Winner	2016 Thailand
Winner	2022 Bangladesh
Winner	2026 UAE
Runner-up	2018 Malaysia
Runner-up	2024 Sri Lanka
- Source: Cricinfo, 22 September 2026

Smriti Shriniwas Mandhana (born 18 July 1996) is an Indian international cricketer and the captain of the Indian women's national team. She was part of the Indian team that won the 2025 Women's Cricket World Cup, the Women's Asia Cup in 2016, 2022 and 2026. She also won gold medals at the 2022 and 2026 Asian Games, and a silver medal in the 2022 Commonwealth Games representing India.

Mandhana is the top overall run scorer in international women’s cricket. She also holds several other records including the record for the most international centuries and the second most centuries in Women's One Day Internationals (WODI). She has scored the most runs and the most half-centuries in Women's Twenty20 Internationals (WT20I). She is the first Indian to score a century in all three formats of women's international cricket–WTests, WODIs and WT20Is, and also holds the record for the fastest century in the ODI format by any Indian batter.

In domestic cricket, Mandhana represents Maharashtra. She captains Royal Challengers Bengaluru in the Women's Premier League (WPL), and had led them to WPL titles in the 2024 and 2026 seasons. She led the Trailblazers in the Women's T20 Challenge from 2019 to 2022, while winning the title in the 2020 season. In 2016, she was signed by Brisbane Heat in the Australian Women's Big Bash League (WBBL). She has also played for Hobart Hurricanes, Sydney Thunder, and Adelaide Strikers in the WBBL, Western Storm in the Women's Cricket Super League and Southern Brave in The Hunded.

Mandhana has won four ICC Awards including Women's Cricketer of the Year in 2018 and 2021, and WODI Cricketer of the Year in 2018 and 2024. She was also nominated for the WT20I Player of the Year in 2021, and the Women's Cricketer of the Year in 2022. She received the Best International Cricketer award by the Board of Control for Cricket in India in 2018 and 2025. She was awarded the Arjuna Award by the Government of India in 2019. She was named as the Women's Leading Cricketer in the World for 2024 by Wisden.

== Early life ==
Smriti Mandhana was born on 18 July 1996 in Mumbai, Maharashtra, to Smita and Shrinivas Mandhana, in a Marwari Hindu family. Her father worked as a chemical distributor, while her mother is a housewife. When she was two years old, her family moved to Madhavnagar, a suburb of Sangli in Maharashtra, where she completed her schooling. She attended Chintaman Rao College of Commerce in Sangli.

Mandhana's father and brother had played cricket at the local level. Watching her brother compete in the junior state tournaments inspired Mandhana to take up the sport.

== Domestic career ==
By the age of nine, Mandhana was selected for Maharashtra's under-15 team, and by eleven, she was picked for the Maharashtra under-19 team. Her breakthrough came in October 2013, when she became the first Indian woman to score a double-century in a List A match against Gujarat under-19 team in the West Zone under-19 tournament at the Alembic Cricket Ground in Vadodara. She scored an unbeaten 224 runs off 150 balls.

In the 2016–17 edition of the Women's Challenger Trophy, Mandhana scored three half-centuries for India Red in as many games. She helped her team win the trophy by making an unbeaten 62 off 82 balls in the final against India Blue, and emerged as the tournament's top-scorer with 192 runs.

== International career ==
=== Debut and early years (2013–2016) ===
Mandhana made her Women's One Day International (WODI) and Women's Twenty20 International (WT20I) debut for the India women's national team in April 2013, when Bangladesh toured India. She scored 48 runs across the two matches she played in the WODI series. She scored 39 runs while opening the batting in her debut and the only WT20I she played in the series. In August 2014, Mandhana was one of the eight players on debut in the Test match victory against England at Sir Paul Getty's Ground in Wormsley. She scored 22 and 51 in her first and second innings respectively and shared an opening-wicket partnership of 76 runs with Thirush Kamini in the second innings while chasing 182 runs for victory.

During India's tour of Australia in 2016, Mandhana scored her first international century against Australia in the second WODI game of the series. Held at the Bellerive Oval in Hobart, she scored 102 off 109 balls in a losing cause. Later in the year, she was the only Indian player to be named in the ICC Women's Team of the Year for 2016.

=== World Cup final and formative years (2017–2020) ===
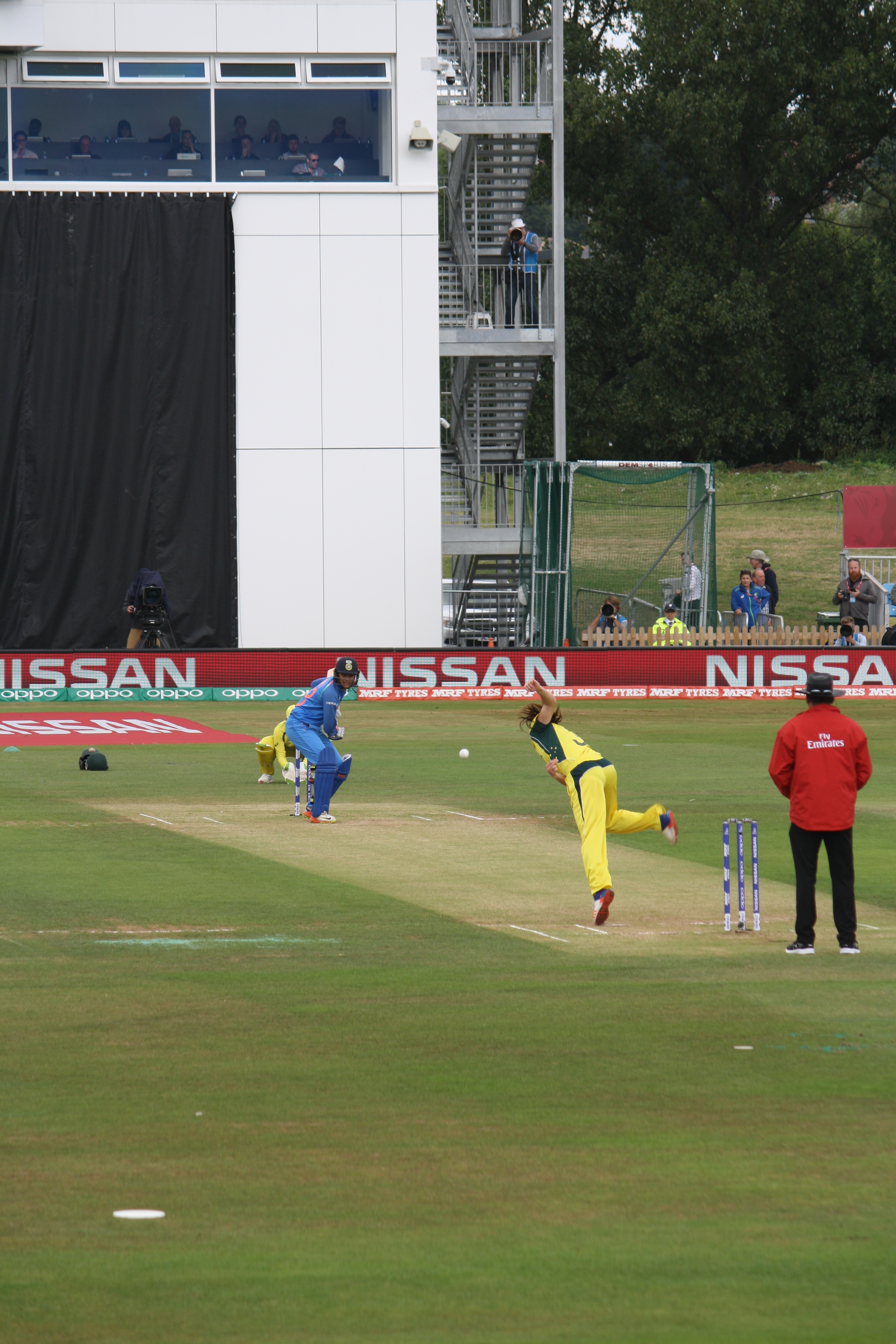
Mandhana batting during the 2017 Women's Cricket World Cup

Mandhana sustained an anterior cruciate ligament injury in January 2017, and missed the World Cup Qualifier and the Quadrangular Series in South Africa during her five-month recovery period. She returned to the Indian squad for the 2017 Women's Cricket World Cup. In the first match against England in Derby, she helped her team win by scoring 35 runs, and was named as the player of the match. She score her second career century in the match against West Indies in the group stage of the tournament. India reached the final of the World Cup where the team lost to England by nine runs.

Mandhana scored the fastest fifty for India in WT20Is off 24 balls against New Zealand in February 2019. In March 2018, she scored a half-century off 30 balls against Australia in the 2017–18 India women's Tri-Nation Series. In the following month, she was named the player of the series in the three-match WODI series played during England's tour of India. In October 2018, she was named in India's squad for the Women's World Twenty20 tournament in the West Indies. Ahead of the tournament, the International Cricket Council named her as one of the key players to watch for in the tournament. During the tournament, she became the third Indian cricketer for score over a thousand runs in WT20I matches. She ended that year as the leading run-scorer in WODIs with 669 runs at a batting average of 66.90. She was awarded the ICC Women's Cricketer of the Year and the ICC Women's ODI Player of the Year in the 2018 ICC Awards.

In February 2019, Mandhana was named as the captain of Indian squad for the three match WT20I series against England after regular captain Harmanpreet Kaur was ruled out with an ankle injury. At 22 years and 229 days, She became the youngest T20I captain for India when she led the team in the first T20I in Guwahati. In May 2019, she won the International Woman Cricketer of the Year awards at CEAT International Cricket Awards 2019. In November 2019, during the series against West Indies, she became the third-fastest cricketer, in terms of innings, to score 2,000 runs in WODIs, doing so in her 51st innings. In January 2020, she was named in Indian squad for the 2020 ICC Women's T20 World Cup in Australia.

=== Consistency and record breaking run (2021–2024) ===
In May 2021, Mandhana was named in Indian squad for the one-off test match against England. In August 2021, she was part of the Indian test squad for the match against Australia. In the first innings of the match, she scored her first century in Test cricket, and thus became the first Indian women's cricketer to score a century in both ODIs and Tests in Australia. She was named the ICC Women's Cricketer of the Year in the 2021 ICC Awards.

In March 2022, she was part of the Indian team for the 2022 Women's Cricket World Cup in New Zealand. In July 2022, she was the vice-captain of the Indian team that won the silver medal in the cricket tournament at the 2022 Commonwealth Games in Birmingham, England. She was also part of the team that won the gold medal in the cricket tournament at the 2022 Asian Games.

Mandhana was part of the Indian squad for the 2024 ICC Women's T20 World Cup. She made 75 runs across four innings in the tournament. In the home series against South Africa, she made 343 runs in three matches including two centuries. In the WT20I series against the same opponents, she scored 193 runs in three matches, which was the most runs scored in a bilateral T20I series for India. In the subsequent series against New Zealand in October 2024, she scored another century in the third match of the series.

In 2024, Mandhana scored 763 runs in WT20Is, the most by any player in T20Is in a single calendar year. During the run, she scored eight half-centuries, the most by an Indian in a year, surpassing Mithali Raj (seven). She also became the second Indian batter to score fifty plus runs in three or more consecutive WT20Is after Raj. She also surpassed the record for the most career half-centuries in WT20Is held by Suzie Bates (28). At the 2024 ICC Awards, she was named ICC Women's Cricketer of the Year and ICC Women's ODI Cricketer of the Year.

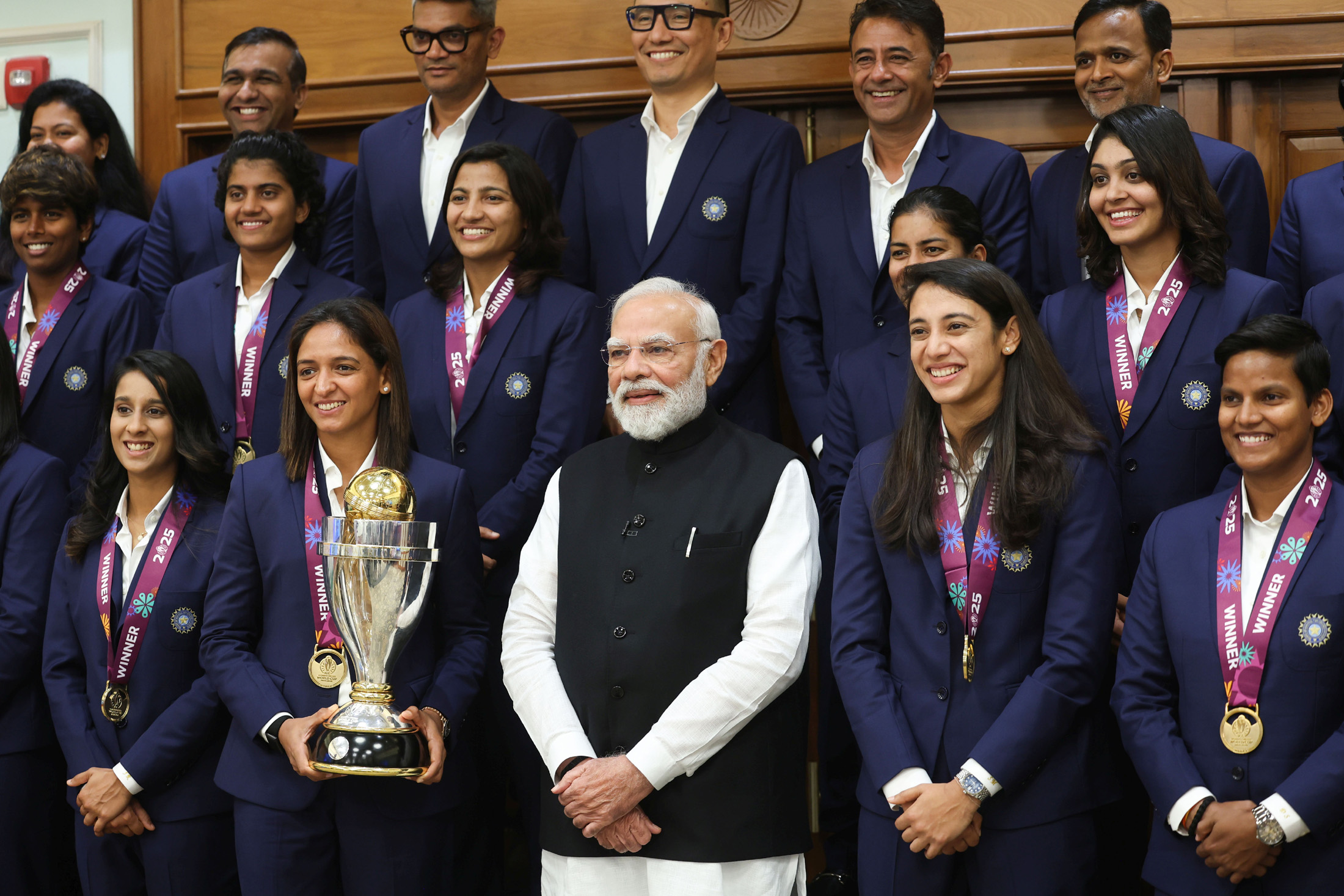
Mandhana (second right; lower) along with prime minister Narendra Modi and the Indian team after the 2025 World Cup win

In January 2025, Mandhana became the fastest Indian cricketer to score 4,000 runs in WODIs. Later in the same month, she scored a century in 70 balls against Ireland, the fastest for India and became the first Indian women's cricketer to score ten centuries in WODIs. On 28 June 2025, she scored her first WT20I century in the series against England and became the first Indian women to score a century in all formats of international cricket.

=== World Cup win and later (2025–present) ===
Mandhana was vice-captain of the Indian team that won the 2025 ICC Women's Cricket World Cup. India defeated South Africa by 52 runs in the final at the DY Patil Stadium on 2 November 2025, becoming World Cup champions for the first time. During the tournament, she scored her 14th WODI century against New Zealand, which made her the joint record holder for the most centuries in international cricket along with Meg Lanning (17). In December 2025, during the first match of the home series against Sri Lanka, she became the second woman batter after Suzie Bates to reach 4,000 runs in T20Is. In the fourth match of the same series, she became the second Indian after Mithali Raj, and the fourth batter overall to complete 10,000 runs in women's international cricket.

== Franchise career ==
In September 2016, Mandhana was signed on a one-year deal by Brisbane Heat (WBBL) in the Australian Women's Big Bash League and became one of the first Indians to be signed up for the league along with Harmanpreet Kaur. Playing against Melbourne Renegades in January 2017, she fell awkwardly while fielding and hurt her knee. She was ruled out of the rest of the tournament having scored 89 runs in 12 innings. Ahead of the 2018–19 season, she was signed by the Hobart Hurricanes. In September 2021, she became part of the Sydney Thunder squad for the 2021–22 WBBL season. During the season, she scored a century (114 runs), while equaling the record for the highest individual score in the tournament.

In June 2018, Mandhana signed for Western Storm in the English Women's Super League, and became the first Indian to play in the league. On 3 August 2018, she scored her first T20 century in the 2018 Women's Cricket Super League season. In 2021, she was drafted by Southern Brave for the inaugural season of The Hundred. She played seven games and scored 167 runs before leaving for India's tour of Australia. In February 2022, she was retained by Southern Brave for the 2022 edition of the Hundred. In January 2026, she was signed by the Manchester Super Giants ahead of the 2026 edition of the tournament.

In 2018, Mandhana was announced as a part of the Trailblazers team in the newly formed Women's T20 Challenge. She led the team that lost to the Supernovas in the inaugural exhibition season in 2018. Later, Trailblazers won the title in 2020 under Mandhana's captaincy. In the inaugural auction of the Women's Premier League in February 2023, she was signed by Royal Challengers Bangalore for ₹34 million (US$360,000), making her the highest-paid player in the auction. She was appointed as the team's captain. She led the team to its maiden WPL title during the 2024 season, in which she finished as the second-highest run getter. In the 2026 WPL season, she led the team to its second title in three seasons, and finished as the highest run-getter in the tournament.

== Statistics ==
As of December 2025, Mandhana has scored more than 10,000 runs with 17 centuries in international cricket. She holds the record for the most international centuries (shared with Meg Lanning) and the second most centuries in WODIs. In June 2025, she became the first Indian woman to score a century in all formats of international cricket. In September 2025, she scored a century against Australia in 50 balls, which is the fastest century in ODIs by an Indian batter. In September 2026, she surpassed Mithali Raj to become the leading International run scorer for Woman's cricket, across all formats.

=== International centuries ===
Centuries by opponents
Opponent	WTest	WODI	WT20I	Total
Australia	1	4	–	5
England	–	–	1	1
Ireland	–	1	–	1
New Zealand	–	3	–	3
South Africa	1	3	–	4
Sri Lanka	–	1	–	1
West Indies	–	2	–	2
Hong Kong	_	_	1	1
Total	2	14	2	18

=== WTest centuries ===
Centuries in WTests
No.	Runs	Opponent	Pos.	Inn.	Test	Venue	H/A	Date	Result	Ref
1	127†	Australia	1	1	1/1	Carrara Stadium	Away	30 September 2021	Draw	
2	149	South Africa	2	1	1/1	M. A. Chidambaram Stadium	Home	28 June 2024	Won	

=== WODI centuries ===
Centuries in WODIs
No.	Runs	Against	Pos.	Inn.	S/R	Venue	H/A/N	Date	Result	Ref
1	102†	Australia	2	1	93.57	Bellerive Oval	Away	5 February 2016	Lost	
2	106*†	West Indies	2	2	98.14	County Ground, Taunton	Neutral	29 June 2017	Won	
3	135†	South Africa	2	1	104.65	De Beers Diamond Oval	Away	7 February 2018	Won	
4	105†	New Zealand	2	2	100.96	McLeannPark	Away	24 January 2019	Won	
5	123†	West Indies	1	1	103.36	Seddon Park	Neutral	12 March 2022	Won	
6	117†	South Africa	2	1	92.12	M. Chinnaswamy Stadium	Home	16 June 2024	Won	
7	136	South Africa	1	1	113.33	M. Chinnaswamy Stadium	Home	19 June 2024	Won	
8	100†	New Zealand	1	2	81.96	Narendra Modi Stadium	Home	29 October 2024	Won	
9	105	Australia	1	2	96.33	WACA Ground	Away	11 December 2024	Lost	
10	135‡	Ireland	2	1	168.75	Niranjan Shah Stadium	Home	15 January 2025	Won	
11	116†	Sri Lanka	2	1	114.85	R. Premadasa Stadium	Away	11 May 2025	Won	
12	117†	Australia	2	1	128.57	Maharaja Yadavindra Singh International Cricket Stadium	Home	17 September 2025	Won	
13	125	Australia	2	1	198.41	Arun Jaitley Cricket Stadium	Home	20 September 2025	Lost	
14	109†	New Zealand	2	1	114.74	DY Patil Stadium	Home	23 October 2025	Won	

=== WT20I centuries ===
Centuries in WT20Is
No.	Runs	Against	Pos.	Inn.	Venue	H/A	Date	Result	Ref
1	112 ‡ †	England	2	1	Trent Bridge	Away	28 June 2025	Won	
2	124†	Hong Kong	1	1	Dubai International Cricket Stadium	Neutral	3 September 2026	Won	

Key

Symbol	Key
*	Not out
†	Player of the match
‡	Captained the Indian team

== Awards and nominations ==
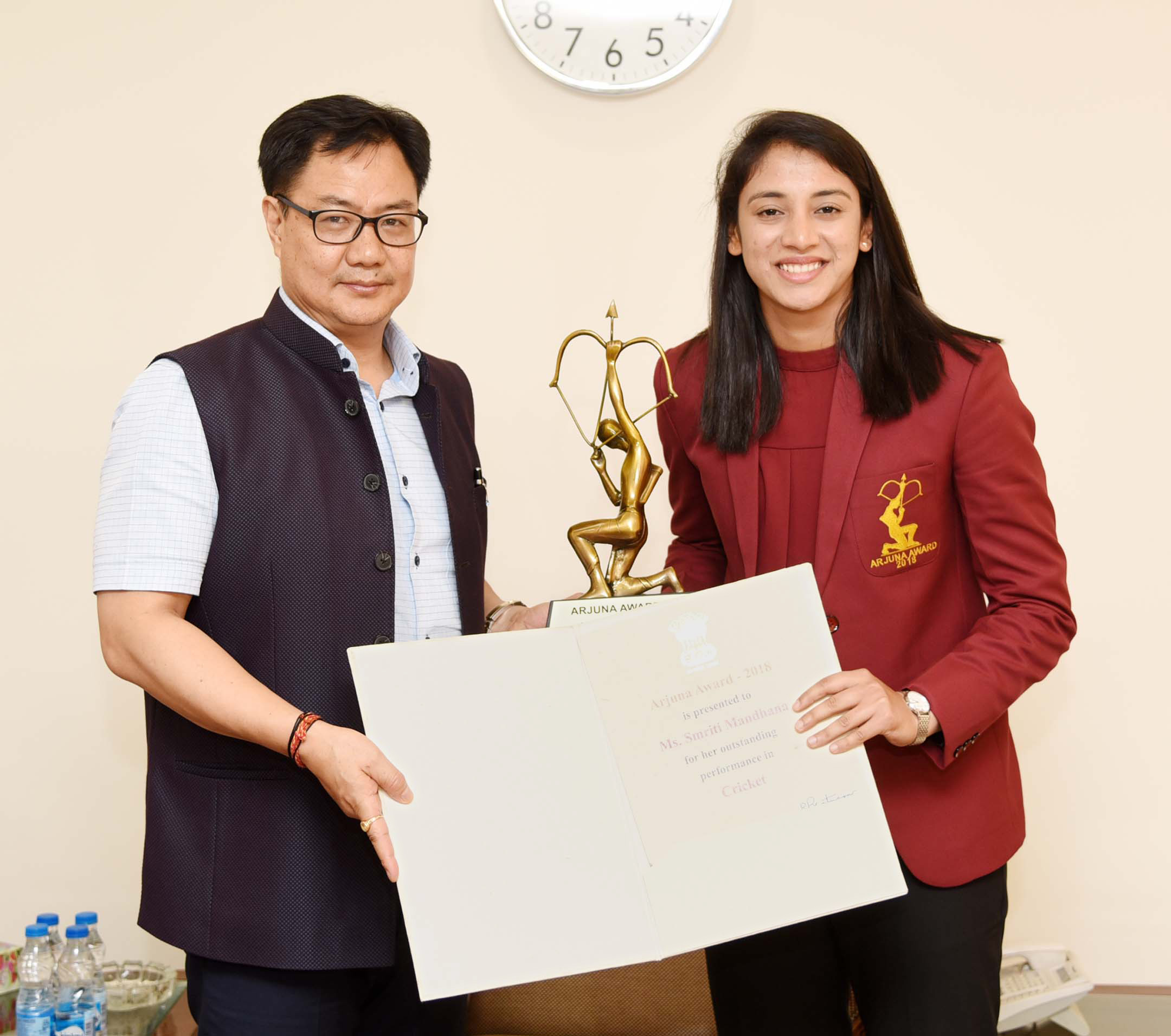
Mandhana receiving the Arjuna Award from the minister of sports Kiren Rijiju on 16 July 2019

Year	Award	Category	Result	Ref
2017	Indian Sports Honours	Emerging Sportswoman of the Year	Nominated	
2018	BCCI Awards	Best International Cricketer	Won	
2018	ICC Awards	Cricketer of the Year	Won	
2018	ICC Awards	Women's ODI Player of the Year	Won	
2019	Arjuna Award	Outstanding Performance in Sports	Won	
2019	Indian Sports Honours	Team Sportswoman of the Year	Won	
2021	ICC Awards	Cricketer of the Year	Won	
2021	ICC Awards	T20I Cricketer of the Year	Nominated	
2021	BCCI Awards	Best International Cricketer	Won	
2021	TOISA	Female Cricketer of the Year	Won	
2021	Indian Sports Honours	Team Sportswoman of the Year	Nominated	
2022	ICC Awards	Cricketer of the Year	Nominated	
2022	ICC Awards	T20I Cricketer of the Year	Nominated	
2022	BCCI Awards	Best International Cricketer	Won	
2024	Indian Sports Honours	Team Sportswoman of the Year	Won	
2024	ICC Awards	Women's Cricketer of the Year	Won	
2024	ICC Awards	ODI Cricketer of the Year	Won	
2024	BBC Awards	Sportswoman of the Year	Nominated	
2024	BCCI Awards	Best International Cricketer	Won	
2025	BCCI Awards	Best International Cricketer	Won	
2025	BCCI Awards	Highest ODI Run-Getter	Won	
2025	TOISA	Cricketer of the Year Female	Nominated	
2025	TOISA	Female Sportsperson of the Year	Won	
2025	Wisden	Leading Cricketer in the World	Won	

== See also ==
- List of centuries in women's One Day International cricket
- List of centuries in women's Test cricket

Preceded by (Australia) Ellyse Perry (Australia) Ellyse Perry	Rachael Heyhoe Flint Award; 2018; 2021	Succeeded by (Australia) Ellyse Perry (England) Nat Sciver-Brunt
