= Baroda Cricket Association Stadium =

Cricket stadium in Vadodara, India

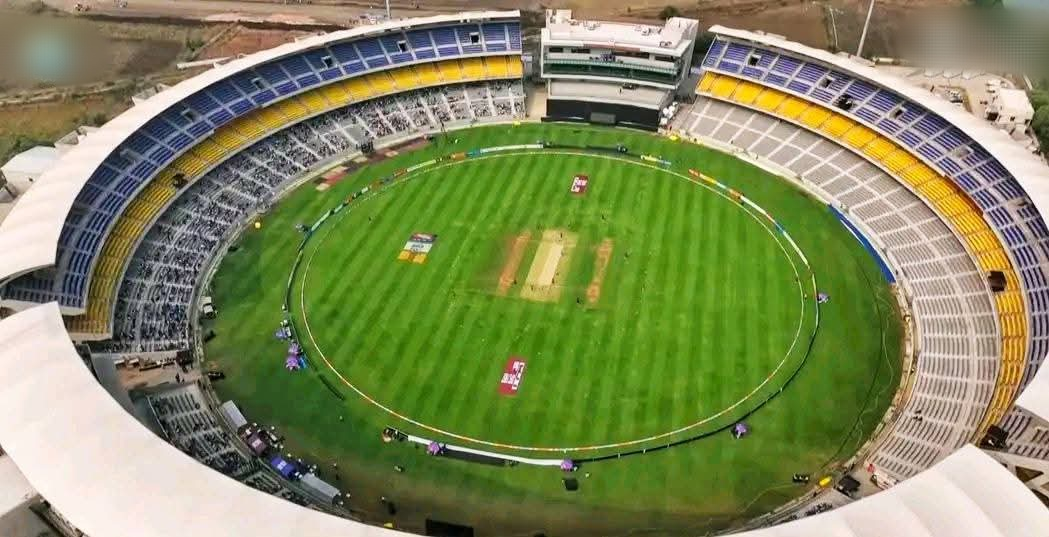
- BCA stadium aerial view.
- Location: Vadodara, Gujarat, India
- Owner: Baroda Cricket Association
- Operator: Baroda Cricket Association
- Capacity: 40,000
- Surface: Grass

Construction
- Groundbreaking: 2008
- Opened: 22 December 2024
- Cost: ₹2,000,000,000 (US$21 million)
- Architects: Studio 3 Designs (S3D), India

Tenants
- India national cricket team India women's national cricket team Baroda cricket team Baroda women's cricket team Gujarat Giants

Ground information
- Country: India
- End names
- BCA Media end

International information
- Only men's ODI: 11 January 2026: India v New Zealand
- First women's ODI: 22 December 2024: India v West Indies
- Last women's ODI: 27 December 2024: India v West Indies
- As of 27 December 2024; Source: ESPNcricinfo

The Baroda Cricket Association Stadium commonly called as the BCA Stadium, also known as Kotambi Stadium and Vadodara International Cricket Stadium, is an international cricket stadium in Vadodara, Gujarat, India. It opened on 22 December 2024 and organised a three match one day international series between the Indian and West Indies women's teams. The stadium is the home ground for Baroda Cricket Association in the domestic circle.

The ground hosted international cricket for the first time during West Indies women's tour of India in 2024. All three ODIs of the tour were played at this Stadium.

== History ==
In January 2015, a Memorandum of Understanding was signed between Government of Gujarat and Baroda Cricket Association for the stadium which will be located at Kotambi on the outskirts of Vadodara with a cost of ₹200 crores to develop 29 acres of land. The stadium was constructed under the executions of Mr. Amit Parikh, a member of the Baroda Cricket Association and Leadership of Mr. Pranav Amin, the President of the Baroda Cricket Association.
