= Women's Premier League (cricket) =

Professional women's Twenty20 cricket league in India

- Tournament logo
- Countries: India
- Administrator: Board of Control for Cricket in India
- Headquarters: Mumbai, India
- Format: T20
- First edition: 2023
- Latest edition: 2026
- Next edition: 2027
- Tournament format: Double round-robin format followed by playoffs
- Current champion: Royal Challengers Bengaluru (2nd title)
- Most successful: Mumbai Indians; Royal Challengers Bengaluru (2 titles each)
- Most runs: (England) Nat Sciver-Brunt (1,348)
- Most wickets: (New Zealand) Amelia Kerr (54)
- TV: India; Star Sports (Television); JioHotstar (Digital); International; List of broadcasters
- Website: wplt20.com

The Women's Premier League (WPL) is a professional women's Twenty20 (T20) cricket league in India, organised by the Board of Control for Cricket in India (BCCI). Founded in 2022, it features five city-based franchise teams. The WPL is one of the fastest-growing cricket leagues in the world.

It is held annually since the inaugural season in 2023. Since 2026, it is held between January and February with a dedicated window in the ICC Future Tours Programme.

As of 2026, there have been four seasons of the tournament with Mumbai Indians and Royal Challengers Bengaluru having won two titles each.

== History ==
The first major women's Twenty20 competition in India was the Women's T20 Challenge. This started as a single-match tournament in 2018, and was expanded to a three-team, four-match competition held in 2019, 2020 and 2022.

In February 2022, then BCCI President Sourav Ganguly announced plans to establish a women's version of the Indian Premier League (IPL), the major men's Twenty20 franchise cricket competition in India, replacing the Women's T20 Challenge. By August plans were more advanced and in October the BCCI announced that they were considering a five-team tournament which would take place in March 2023. This league was informally known as the Women's Indian Premier League; then BCCI Secretary Jay Shah clarified that the BCCI officially named it the Women's Premier League.

On 28 January 2023, the BCCI invited bids for the league's title sponsorship rights until 2027. Tata Group won the bid for an undisclosed amount. Mumbai Indians were the inaugural winners of the tournament, beating Delhi Capitals in the final.

== Organisation ==
The league's structure is based on the structure of the IPL.

Initially there are five teams, each playing against each other in a double round-robin format, and the three teams finishing with the most points entering the playoff stages of the competition. The Board plans to increase the number of matches and franchises in future seasons if the league is a success.

The inaugural season of the league took place from 4 to 26 March 2023, and featured 22 matches, all held at Brabourne Stadium and DY Patil Stadium in Mumbai. Tickets were made available free to women during the first season.

The second season of the WPL took place from 23 February to 17 March 2024. The tournament maintained its structure with five teams competing in a double round-robin format, followed by playoffs. Matches were held at the M. Chinnaswamy Stadium in Bengaluru and the Arun Jaitley Stadium in New Delhi. Royal Challengers Bengaluru clinched their first title by defeating Delhi Capitals in the final. Ellyse Perry led the season in runs with 347, while Shreyanka Patil topped the wickets chart with 13 dismissals.

The league's mascot, Shakti, is a tigress wearing a sky blue cricket jersey.

== Teams ==
As of the 2026 season, the league has five teams based in cities across India.

All 5 WPL teams in the cities they are based in

Team	City	Home ground	Debut	Captain	Head coach
Delhi Capitals	New Delhi	Arun Jaitley Stadium	2023	Jemimah Rodrigues	Jonathan Batty
Gujarat Giants	Vadodara	Baroda Cricket Association Stadium	2023	Ashleigh Gardner	Michael Klinger
Mumbai Indians	Mumbai	Wankhede Stadium	2023	Harmanpreet Kaur	Luke Williams
Royal Challengers Bengaluru	Bengaluru	M. Chinnaswamy Stadium	2023	Smriti Mandhana	Malolan Rangarajan
UP Warriorz	Lucknow	Ekana Stadium	2023	Meg Lanning	Abhishek Nayar

== Tournament results ==
Year	Final			Venue	Player of the Season
Year	Winner	Result	Runners up	Venue	Player of the Season
2023	Mumbai Indians; 134/3 (19.3 overs)	Mumbai Indians won by 7 wickets Scorecard	Delhi Capitals; 131/9 (20 overs)	Brabourne Stadium, Mumbai	Hayley Matthews (MI)
2024	Royal Challengers Bengaluru; 115/2 (19.3 overs)	Royal Challengers Bengaluru won by 8 wickets Scorecard	Delhi Capitals; 113 (18.3 overs)	Arun Jaitley Stadium, New Delhi	Deepti Sharma (UPW)
2025	Mumbai Indians; 149/7 (20 overs)	Mumbai Indians won by 8 runs Scorecard	Delhi Capitals; 141/9 (20 overs)	Brabourne Stadium, Mumbai	Nat Sciver-Brunt (MI)
2026	Royal Challengers Bengaluru; 204/4 (19.4 overs)	Royal Challengers Bengaluru won by 6 wickets Scorecard	Delhi Capitals; 203/4 (20 overs)	Baroda Cricket Association Stadium, Vadodara	Sophie Devine (GG)

== Performance record ==
Teams	2023 (5)	2024 (5)	2025 (5)	2026 (5)
Delhi Capitals	Runners-up	Runners-up	Runners-up	Runners-up
Gujarat Giants	5th (League Stage)	5th (League Stage)	3rd (Lost in eliminator)	3rd (Lost in eliminator)
Mumbai Indians	Champions	3rd (Lost in eliminator)	Champions	4th (League Stage)
Royal Challengers Bengaluru	4th (League Stage)	Champions	4th (League Stage)	Champions
UP Warriorz	3rd (Lost in eliminator)	4th (League Stage)	5th (League Stage)	5th (League Stage)

Teams performance across seasons
	Appearances			Best result	Statistics						
	Total	First	Latest	Best result	Played	Won	Lost	Tied+W	Tied+L	NR	Win%
Delhi Capitals	4	2023	2026	Runners-up (2023, 2024, 2025, 2026)	37	22	15	0	0	0	59.45
Gujarat Giants	4	2023	2026	Eliminator (2025, 2026)	34	13	21	0	0	0	38.23
Mumbai Indians	4	2023	2026	Champions (2023, 2025)	37	23	14	0	0	0	62.16
Royal Challengers Bengaluru	4	2023	2026	Champions (2024, 2026)	35	18	16	0	1	0	52.85
UP Warriorz	4	2023	2026	Eliminator (2023)	33	11	21	1	0	0	34.84

== Records and statistics ==
A summary of the most notable statistical records associated with the tournament is provided below:

Batting records
Most runs	Nat Sciver-Brunt (MI)	1,348
Highest score	Nat Sciver-Brunt (MI)	100* (vs RCB, 26 January 2026)
Most hundreds	Nat Sciver-Brunt (MI)	1
Most fifties	Nat Sciver-Brunt (MI)	12
Highest partnership	Smriti Mandhana & Georgia Voll (RCB)	165 (vs DC, 5 February 2026)
Most sixes	Shafali Verma (DC)	53
Bowling records
Most wickets	Amelia Kerr (MI)	54
Best bowling figures	Ellyse Perry (RCB)	6/15 (vs MI, 12 March 2024)
Fielding
Most dismissals (wicket-keeper)	Richa Ghosh (RCB)	36
Most catches (fielder)	Ashleigh Gardner (GG)	23
Team records
Highest total	UP Warriorz	225/5 (20 overs vs RCB, 8 March 2025)
Lowest total	Gujarat Giants	64 (15.1 overs vs MI, 4 March 2023)

- Source: ESPNcricinfo

As of 5 February 2026

== Awards ==
=== Prize Money ===
Starting with the 2026 season, the distribution of the prize money is as follows:

- Winning team: ₹6 crore
- Runner-up team: ₹3 crore
- Player of the Tournament: ₹5 lakh
- Orange Cap winner: ₹5 lakh
- Purple Cap winner: ₹5 lakh

=== Orange Cap ===
The Orange Cap is awarded to the highest run-scorer at the end of each season.

=== Purple Cap ===
The Purple Cap is awarded to the highest wicket-taker at the end of each season.

=== Fair Play Award ===
The Fair Play Award is given to the team considered to have the best fair play record in the season.

== Financial background ==
The BCCI intends to distribute 80% of the profits from the competition among the franchise owners during the first five years. For the next five seasons, 60% of the profits will be shared, and from seasons 11 to 15, 50% of the profits will be distributed. Additionally, 80% of the revenue from the central licensing rights for the competition will be shared with the franchises. Franchises will also generate revenue through merchandise, ticket sales and advertising.

== Player auction ==
The first auction to purchase players for each franchise was held on 13 February 2023 at Mumbai. Around 1,500 players registered their names. Each franchise had ₹12 crore (US$1.2 million) to spend and had to purchase between 15 and 18 players, six of whom could be overseas players.

The base price of an uncapped player at the first auction was between ₹10 lakh (US$10,000) and ₹20 lakh (US$21,000). For capped players it was between ₹30 lakh (US$31,000) and ₹50 lakh (US$52,000). In future seasons the purse size for each franchise will be increased by ₹1.5 crore (US$160,000) each year.

In the first auction a total of ₹59.50 crore (US$6.2 million) was spent to purchase 87 players. Smriti Mandhana was the most expensive player purchased in the initial auction; she signed for Royal Challengers Bengaluru for ₹3.4 crore (US$350,000) and was appointed as the team's captain.

== Broadcasting ==
In January 2023, Viacom18 announced that it had acquired the global media rights for TV and digital broadcasts of the tournament. The contract run for five years and was worth 951 crore. The initial season of the league broadcast in India on the Sports18 TV channel and the JioCinema app, both of which are owned by Viacom18.

The first season of the competition was broadcast in the United Kingdom on Sky Sports, in Australia by Fox Sports Australia, in the United States and Canada by Willow TV and in South Africa by SuperSports. In New Zealand it is aired by Sky Sport, in Malaysia and Hong Kong by Astro Cricket while in mainland China by Star Sports. Furthermore, in the Caribbean islands is live on Sportsmax TV.

After the Viacom 18 and Disney Star merger in 2025, Star Sports and JioHotstar became the official Television and Digital broadcasters respectively in India.

== See also ==
- KFC Twenty20 Big Bash
- Australian Women's Twenty20 Cup
- Indian Premier League
