= 2024 Royal Challengers Bangalore (WPL) season =

WPL cricket team in 2024

Royal Challengers Bangalore
2024 season
- Coach: Luke Williams
- Captain: Smriti Mandhana
- WPL League: Qualified for Playoffs (Eliminator)
- WPL Eliminator: Qualified for Final
- WPL Final: Maiden title
- Most runs: Ellyse Perry (347)
- Most wickets: Shreyanka Patil (13)
- Most catches: Georgia Wareham (6)
- Most wicket-keeping dismissals: Richa Ghosh (13)

The 2024 season was the second season for the franchise Royal Challengers Bangalore. They were one of five teams that competed in the 2024 Women's Premier League. They finished at the fourth place in the previous (inaugural) season's League stage.

Royal Challengers Bangalore qualified for the WPL Playoffs for the first time, after being placed third in the Points table. They qualified for the Final after their win against Mumbai Indians in the Eliminator. They won their maiden title after defeating Delhi Capitals in the Final.

== Squad ==
- Players with international caps are listed in **bold**.
- Ages as of 23 February 2024

Name	Nationality	Birth date	Batting style	Bowling style	Notes
Captain
**Smriti Mandhana**	India	18 July 1996 (age 30)	Left-handed	Right-arm off break	
Batters
Disha Kasat	India	19 September 1997 (age 29)	Right-handed	Right-arm medium	
**Sabbhineni Meghana**	India	7 June 1996 (age 30)	Right-handed	Right-arm medium	
All-rounders
**Kanika Ahuja**	India	7 August 2002 (age 24)	Left-handed	Right-arm off break	
Asha Sobhana	India	16 March 1991 (age 35)	Right-handed	Right-arm leg break	
**Sophie Devine**	New Zealand	1 September 1989 (age 37)	Right-handed	Right-arm medium	Overseas player
**Heather Knight**	England	26 December 1990 (age 35)	Right-handed	Right-arm off break	Overseas player
**Ellyse Perry**	Australia	3 November 1990 (age 35)	Right-handed	Right-arm medium	Overseas player
**Shubha Satheesh**	India	13 July 1999 (age 27)	Left-handed	Right-arm medium	
Wicket-keepers
**Richa Ghosh**	India	28 September 2003 (age 22)	Right-handed	Right-arm medium	
Indrani Roy	India	5 September 1997 (age 29)	Right-handed	Right-arm medium	
Bowlers
**Simran Bahadur**	India	13 December 1999 (age 26)	Left-handed	Right-arm medium	
**Ekta Bisht**	India	8 February 1986 (age 40)	Left-handed	Slow left-arm orthodox	
**Kate Cross**	England	3 October 1991 (age 34)	Right-handed	Right-arm medium	Overseas player
**Sophie Molineux**	Australia	17 January 1998 (age 28)	Left-handed	Slow left-arm orthodox	Overseas player
**Shreyanka Patil**	India	31 July 2002 (age 24)	Right-handed	Right-arm off break	
**Renuka Singh**	India	1 February 1996 (age 30)	Right-handed	Right-arm medium	
**Georgia Wareham**	Australia	23 May 1999 (age 27)	Right-handed	Right-arm leg break	Overseas player

== Administration and support staff ==
Position	Name
Director of cricket	Mo Bobat
Head of team operations	Soumyadeep Pyne
Team manager & doctor	Dr Harini Muralidharan
Head coach	Luke Williams
Assistant head coach	Malolan Rangarajan
Batting coach	RX Murali
Fielding coach	Vellaswamy Vanitha

- Source: Official website

== Sponsors ==
- Title sponsor: Kajaria Tiles
- Principal partners: Mia by Tanishq & Dream11
- Official partners: Zuno General Insurance
- Associate partners: Puma, Himalaya, & Vega
- Kit manufacturer: Puma
- Main shirt sponsor: Kajaria
- Back shirt sponsor: Mia

== League stage ==
Pos	Team	Pld	W	L	NR	Pts	NRR	
1	Delhi Capitals (R)	8	6	2	0	12	1.198	Advanced to the Final
2	Mumbai Indians (3rd)	8	5	3	0	10	0.024	Advanced to the Eliminator
3	Royal Challengers Bangalore (C)	8	4	4	0	8	0.306	Advanced to the Eliminator
4	UP Warriorz	8	3	5	0	6	−0.371	
5	Gujarat Giants	8	2	6	0	4	−1.158	

Source: ESPNcricinfo
(C) Champions; (R) Runners-up

=== Fixtures and results ===
Match 2
24 February 2024
19:30 (N)
Scorecard

Royal Challengers Bangalore; 157/6 (20 overs)	v	UP Warriorz; 155/7 (20 overs)
Richa Ghosh 62 (37); Rajeshwari Gayakwad 2/24 (4 overs)		Grace Harris 38 (23); Sobhana Asha 5/22 (4 overs)

Royal Challengers Bangalore won by 2 runs
M. Chinnaswamy Stadium, Bengaluru
Umpires: Abhijit Bhattacharya and Narayanan Janani
Player of the match: Sobhana Asha (Royal Challengers Bangalore)

- UP Warriorz won the toss and elected to field.

Match 5
27 February 2024
19:30 (N)
Scorecard

Gujarat Giants; 107/7 (20 overs)	v	Royal Challengers Bangalore; 110/2 (12.3 overs)
Dayalan Hemalatha 31* (25); Sophie Molineux 3/25 (4 overs)		Smriti Mandhana 43 (27); Ashleigh Gardner 1/15 (3 overs)

Royal Challengers Bangalore won by 8 wickets
M. Chinnaswamy Stadium, Bengaluru
Umpires: Parashar Joshi and Mohamed Rafi
Player of the match: Renuka Singh (Royal Challengers Bangalore)

- Royal Challengers Bangalore won the toss and elected to field.

Match 7
29 February 2024
19:30 (N)
Scorecard

Delhi Capitals; 194/5 (20 overs)	v	Royal Challengers Bangalore; 169/9 (20 overs)
Shafali Verma 50 (31); Sophie Devine 2/23 (3 overs)		Smriti Mandhana 74 (43); Jess Jonassen 3/21 (4 overs)

Delhi Capitals won by 25 runs
M. Chinnaswamy Stadium, Bengaluru
Umpires: Abhijit Bhattacharya and Narayanan Janani
Player of the match: Marizanne Kapp (Delhi Capitals)

- Royal Challengers Bangalore won the toss and elected to field.

Match 9
2 March 2024
19:30 (N)
Scorecard

Royal Challengers Bangalore; 131/6 (20 overs)	v	Mumbai Indians; 133/3 (15.1 overs)
Ellyse Perry 44* (38); Pooja Vastrakar 2/14 (3 overs)		Amelia Kerr 40* (24); Shreyanka Patil 1/15 (2 overs)

Mumbai Indians won by 7 wickets
M. Chinnaswamy Stadium, Bengaluru
Umpires: Mohit Krishnadas and Pashchim Pathak
Player of the match: Amelia Kerr (Mumbai Indians)

- Mumbai Indians won the toss and elected to field.

Match 11
4 March 2024
19:30 (N)
Scorecard

Royal Challengers Bangalore; 198/3 (20 overs)	v	UP Warriorz; 175/8 (20 overs)
Smriti Mandhana 80 (50); Sophie Ecclestone 1/22 (4 overs)		Alyssa Healy 55 (38); Sobhana Asha 2/29 (4 overs); Sophie Molineux 2/29 (4 overs)

Royal Challengers Bangalore won by 23 runs
M. Chinnaswamy Stadium, Bengaluru
Umpires: Abhijeet Bengeri and Vrinda Rathi
Player of the match: Smriti Mandhana (Royal Challengers Bangalore)

- UP Warriorz won the toss and elected to field.

Match 13
6 March 2024
19:30 (N)
Scorecard

Gujarat Giants; 199/5 (20 overs)	v	Royal Challengers Bangalore; 180/8 (20 overs)
Beth Mooney 85* (51); Sophie Molineux 1/32 (4 overs)		Georgia Wareham 48 (22); Ashleigh Gardner 2/23 (4 overs)

Gujarat Giants won by 19 runs
Arun Jaitley Cricket Stadium, New Delhi
Umpires: Puttarangaiah Jayapal and Gayathri Venugopalan
Player of the match: Beth Mooney (Gujarat Giants)

- Gujarat Giants won the toss and elected to bat.

Match 17
10 March 2024
19:30 (N)
Scorecard

Delhi Capitals; 181/5 (20 overs)	v	Royal Challengers Bangalore; 180/7 (20 overs)
Jemimah Rodrigues 58 (36); Shreyanka Patil 4/26 (4 overs)		Richa Ghosh 51 (29); Alice Capsey 1/5 (1 over)

Delhi Capitals won by 1 run
Arun Jaitley Cricket Stadium, New Delhi
Umpires: Abhijit Bhattacharya and Narayanan Janani
Player of the match: Jemimah Rodrigues (Delhi Capitals)

- Delhi Capitals won the toss and elected to bat.
- Delhi Capitals qualified for the playoffs as a result of this match.

Match 19
12 March 2024
19:30 (N)
Scorecard

Mumbai Indians; 113 (19 overs)	v	Royal Challengers Bangalore; 115/3 (15 overs)
Sajeevan Sajana 30 (21); Ellyse Perry 6/15 (4 overs)		Ellyse Perry 40* (38); Hayley Matthews 1/11 (2 overs)

Royal Challengers Bangalore won by 7 wickets
Arun Jaitley Cricket Stadium, New Delhi
Umpires: Mohit Krishnadas and Pashchim Pathak
Player of the match: Ellyse Perry (Royal Challengers Bangalore)

- Royal Challengers Bangalore won the toss and elected to field.
- Royal Challengers Bangalore qualified for the playoffs as a result of this match.

== Playoffs ==
Eliminator			Final
			1	Delhi Capitals	113 (18.3 overs)
2	Mumbai Indians	130/6 (20 overs)	EW	Royal Challengers Bangalore	115/2 (19.3 overs)
3	Royal Challengers Bangalore	135/6 (20 overs)

=== Eliminator ===
Eliminator
15 March 2024
19:30 (N)
Scorecard

Royal Challengers Bangalore; 135/6 (20 overs)	v	Mumbai Indians; 130/6 (20 overs)
Ellyse Perry 66 (50); Hayley Matthews 2/18 (4 overs); Nat Sciver-Brunt 2/18 (4 overs)		Harmanpreet Kaur 33 (30); Shreyanka Patil 2/16 (4 overs)

Royal Challengers Bangalore won by 5 runs
Arun Jaitley Cricket Stadium, New Delhi
Umpires: Parashar Joshi and Gayathri Venugopalan
Player of the match: Ellyse Perry (Royal Challengers Bangalore)

- Royal Challengers Bangalore won the toss and elected to bat.

=== Final ===
Final
17 March 2024
19:30 (N)
Scorecard

Delhi Capitals; 113 (18.3 overs)	v	Royal Challengers Bangalore; 115/2 (19.3 overs)
Shafali Verma 44 (27); Shreyanka Patil 4/12 (3.3 overs)		Ellyse Perry 35* (37); Shikha Pandey 1/11 (4 overs)

Royal Challengers Bangalore won by 8 wickets
Arun Jaitley Cricket Stadium, New Delhi
Umpires: Abhijit Bhattacharya and Gayathri Venugopalan
Player of the match: Sophie Molineux (Royal Challengers Bangalore)

- Delhi Capitals won the toss and elected to bat.

== Statistics ==
=== Most runs ===
Runs	Player	Inns	Highest score	Average
347	Ellyse Perry	9	66	69.40
300	Smriti Mandhana	10	80	30.00
257	Richa Ghosh	10	62	42.83
168	Sabbhineni Meghana	7	53	33.60
136	Sophie Devine	10	32	15.11

- Source: ESPNcricinfo

=== Most wickets ===
Wickets	Player	Innings	Best bowling
13	Shreyanka Patil	8	4/12
12	Asha Sobhana	10	5/22
12	Sophie Molineux	10	3/20
7	Ellyse Perry	7	6/15
7	Georgia Wareham	10	2/38

- Source: ESPNcricinfo
