= 2024 Mumbai Indians (WPL) season =

WPL cricket team in 2024

Mumbai Indians
2024 season
- Coach: Charlotte Edwards
- Captain: Harmanpreet Kaur
- WPL League: Qualified for Playoffs (Eliminator)
- WPL Eliminator: Lost to Bangalore
- Most runs: Harmanpreet Kaur (268)
- Most wickets: Nat Sciver-Brunt (10)
- Most catches: Sajeevan Sajana (5)
- Most wicket-keeping dismissals: Yastika Bhatia (7)

The 2024 season was the second season for the franchise Mumbai Indians. They were one of five teams that competed in the 2024 Women's Premier League. They were the inaugural champions of the previous (inaugural) season after defeating Delhi Capitals in the Final.

Mumbai Indians qualified for the WPL Eliminator after being placed 2nd in the League stage table for the consecutive 2nd year. They lost to Royal Challengers Bangalore in the Eliminator.

== Squad ==
- Players with international caps are listed in **bold**.
- Ages as of 23 February 2023

Name	Nationality	Birth date	Batting style	Bowling style	Notes
Captain
**Harmanpreet Kaur**	India	8 March 1989 (aged 34)	Right-handed	Right-arm off break	
All-rounders
Keerthana Balakrishnan	India	Unknown	Right-handed	Right-arm leg break	
Jintimani Kalita	India	25 December 2003 (aged 20)	Left-handed	Right-arm medium	
**Amanjot Kaur**	India	1 January 2000 (aged 24)	Right-handed	Right-arm medium	
Humaira Kazi	India	5 October 1993 (aged 30)	Right-handed	Right-arm medium	
**Amelia Kerr**	New Zealand	13 October 2000 (aged 23)	Right-handed	Right-arm leg break	Overseas player
**Hayley Matthews**	West Indies	19 March 1998 (aged 25)	Right-handed	Right-arm off break	Overseas player
Sajeevan Sajana	India	4 January 1995 (aged 29)	Right-handed	Right-arm off break	
**Nat Sciver-Brunt**	England	20 August 1992 (aged 31)	Right-handed	Right-arm medium	Overseas player
**Chloe Tryon**	South Africa	25 January 1994 (aged 30)	Right-handed	Slow left-arm orthodox	Overseas player
**Pooja Vastrakar**	India	25 September 1999 (aged 24)	Right-handed	Right-arm medium	
Wicket-keepers
Priyanka Bala	India	30 September 1995 (aged 28)	Right-handed	Right-arm medium	
**Yastika Bhatia**	India	1 November 2000 (aged 23)	Left-handed	Slow left-arm orthodox	
Bowlers
**Saika Ishaque**	India	8 October 1995 (aged 28)	Left-handed	Slow left-arm orthodox	
**Shabnim Ismail**	South Africa	5 October 1988 (aged 35)	Right-handed	Right-arm fast	Overseas player
Fatima Jaffer	India	Unknown	Right-handed	Right-arm medium	
Amandeep Kaur	India	31 December 1993 (aged 30)	Left-handed	Slow left-arm orthodox	
**Issy Wong**	England	15 May 2002 (aged 21)	Right-handed	Right-arm medium	Overseas player

== Support staff ==
Position	Name
Head coach	Charlotte Edwards
Batting coach	Devika Palshikar
Bowling coach/Mentor	Jhulan Goswami
Fielding coach	Lydia Greenway

- Source: Official website

== Sponsors ==
- Kit manufacturer: Skechers
- Main shirt sponsor: Lotus Herbals
- Back shirt sponsor: Ashok Leyland

== League stage ==
Pos	Team	Pld	W	L	NR	Pts	NRR	
1	Delhi Capitals (R)	8	6	2	0	12	1.198	Advanced to the Final
2	Mumbai Indians (3rd)	8	5	3	0	10	0.024	Advanced to the Eliminator
3	Royal Challengers Bengaluru (C)	8	4	4	0	8	0.306	Advanced to the Eliminator
4	UP Warriorz	8	3	5	0	6	−0.371	
5	Gujarat Giants	8	2	6	0	4	−1.158	

Source: ESPNcricinfo
(C) Champions; (R) Runners-up

=== Fixtures and results ===
Match 1
23 February 2024
20:00 (N)
Scorecard

Delhi Capitals; 171/5 (20 overs)	v	Mumbai Indians; 173/6 (20 overs)
Alice Capsey 75 (53); Nat Sciver-Brunt 2/33 (4 overs)		Yastika Bhatia 57 (45); Alice Capsey 2/23 (2 overs)

Mumbai Indians won by 4 wickets
M. Chinnaswamy Stadium, Bengaluru
Umpires: Abhijeet Bengeri and Vrinda Rathi
Player of the match: Harmanpreet Kaur (Mumbai Indians)

- Mumbai Indians won the toss and elected to field.

Match 3
25 February 2024
19:30 (N)
Scorecard

Gujarat Giants; 126/9 (20 overs)	v	Mumbai Indians; 129/5 (18.1 overs)
Tanuja Kanwar 28 (21); Amelia Kerr 4/17 (4 overs)		Harmanpreet Kaur 46* (41); Tanuja Kanwar 2/21 (4 overs)

Mumbai Indians won by 5 wickets
M. Chinnaswamy Stadium, Bengaluru
Umpires: Puttarangaiah Jayapal and Gayathri Venugopalan
Player of the match: Amelia Kerr (Mumbai Indians)

- Mumbai Indians won the toss and elected to field.

Match 6
28 February 2024
19:30 (N)
Scorecard

Mumbai Indians; 161/6 (20 overs)	v	UP Warriorz; 163/3 (16.3 overs)
Hayley Matthews 55 (47); Grace Harris 1/20 (4 overs)		Kiran Navgire 57 (31); Issy Wong 2/30 (3 overs)

UP Warriorz won by 7 wickets
M. Chinnaswamy Stadium, Bengaluru
Umpires: Abhijeet Bengeri and Vrinda Rathi
Player of the match: Kiran Navgire (UP Warriorz)

- UP Warriorz won the toss and elected to field.

Match 9
2 March 2024
19:30 (N)
Scorecard

Royal Challengers Bangalore; 131/6 (20 overs)	v	Mumbai Indians; 133/3 (15.1 overs)
Ellyse Perry 44* (38); Pooja Vastrakar 2/14 (3 overs)		Amelia Kerr 40* (24); Shreyanka Patil 1/15 (2 overs)

Mumbai Indians won by 7 wickets
M. Chinnaswamy Stadium, Bengaluru
Umpires: Mohit Krishnadas and Pashchim Pathak
Player of the match: Amelia Kerr (Mumbai Indians)

- Mumbai Indians won the toss and elected to field.

Match 12
5 March 2024
19:30 (N)
Scorecard

Delhi Capitals; 192/4 (20 overs)	v	Mumbai Indians; 163/8 (20 overs)
Jemimah Rodrigues 69* (33); Pooja Vastrakar 1/20 (4 overs)		Amanjot Kaur 42 (27); Jess Jonassen 3/21 (4 overs)

Delhi Capitals won by 29 runs
Arun Jaitley Cricket Stadium, New Delhi
Umpires: Abhijit Bhattacharya and Narayanan Janani
Player of the match: Jemimah Rodrigues (Delhi Capitals)

- Mumbai Indians won the toss and elected to field.

Match 14
7 March 2024
19:30 (N)
Scorecard

Mumbai Indians; 160/6 (20 overs)	v	UP Warriorz; 118/9 (20 overs)
Nat Sciver-Brunt 45 (31); Chamari Athapaththu 2/27 (4 overs)		Deepti Sharma 53* (36); Saika Ishaque 3/27 (4 overs)

Mumbai Indians won by 42 runs
Arun Jaitley Cricket Stadium, New Delhi
Umpires: Mohit Krishnadas and Pashchim Pathak
Player of the match: Nat Sciver-Brunt (Mumbai Indians)

- Mumbai Indians won the toss and elected to bat.

Match 16
9 March 2024
19:30 (N)
Scorecard

Gujarat Giants; 190/7 (20 overs)	v	Mumbai Indians; 191/3 (19.5 overs)
Dayalan Hemalatha 74 (40); Saika Ishaque 2/31 (4 overs)		Harmanpreet Kaur 95* (48); Tanuja Kanwar 1/21 (4 overs)

Mumbai Indians won by 7 wickets
Arun Jaitley Cricket Stadium, New Delhi
Umpires: Abhijeet Bengeri and Vrinda Rathi
Player of the match: Harmanpreet Kaur (Mumbai Indians)

- Gujarat Giants won the toss and elected to bat.
- Mumbai Indians qualified for the playoffs as a result of this match.

Match 19
12 March 2024
19:30 (N)
Scorecard

Mumbai Indians; 113 (19 overs)	v	Royal Challengers Bangalore; 115/3 (15 overs)
Sajeevan Sajana 30 (21); Ellyse Perry 6/15 (4 overs)		Ellyse Perry 40* (38); Hayley Matthews 1/11 (2 overs)

Royal Challengers Bangalore won by 7 wickets
Arun Jaitley Cricket Stadium, New Delhi
Umpires: Mohit Krishnadas and Pashchim Pathak
Player of the match: Ellyse Perry (Royal Challengers Bangalore)

- Royal Challengers Bangalore won the toss and elected to field.
- Royal Challengers Bangalore qualified for the playoffs as a result of this match.

== Playoffs ==
Eliminator			Final
			1	Delhi Capitals	113 (18.3 overs)
2	Mumbai Indians	130/6 (20 overs)	EW	Royal Challengers Bengaluru	115/2 (19.3 overs)
3	Royal Challengers Bengaluru	135/6 (20 overs)

=== Eliminator ===
Eliminator
15 March 2024
19:30 (N)
Scorecard

Royal Challengers Bengaluru; 135/6 (20 overs)	v	Mumbai Indians; 130/6 (20 overs)
Ellyse Perry 66 (50); Hayley Matthews 2/18 (4 overs); Nat Sciver-Brunt 2/18 (4 overs)		Harmanpreet Kaur 33 (30); Shreyanka Patil 2/16 (4 overs)

Royal Challengers Bengaluru won by 5 runs
Arun Jaitley Cricket Stadium, New Delhi
Umpires: Parashar Joshi and Gayathri Venugopalan
Player of the match: Ellyse Perry (Royal Challengers Bengaluru)

- Royal Challengers Bengaluru won the toss and elected to bat.

== Statistics ==
=== Most runs ===
Runs	Player	Innings	Highest score	Average
268	Harmanpreet Kaur	7	95*	53.60
215	Amelia Kerr	9	40*	35.83
204	Yastika Bhatia	8	57	25.50
180	Hayley Matthews	9	55	20.00
172	Nat Sciver-Brunt	9	45	19.11

- Source: ESPNcricinfo

=== Most wickets ===
Wickets	Player	Innings	Best bowling
10	Nat Sciver-Brunt	9	2/14
9	Saika Ishaque	9	3/27
8	Shabnim Ismail	7	3/18
7	Hayley Matthews	9	2/18
7	Amelia Kerr	9	4/17

- Source: ESPNcricinfo
