= 2024 UP Warriorz season =

WPL cricket team in 2024

UP Warriorz
2024 season
- Coach: Jon Lewis
- Captain: Alyssa Healy
- WPL League: Finished at the 4th place
- Most runs: Deepti Sharma (295)
- Most wickets: Sophie Ecclestone (11)
- Most catches: Grace Harris (5)
- Most wicket-keeping dismissals: Alyssa Healy (4)

The 2024 season is the second season for the franchise UP Warriorz. They are one of five teams that are competing in the 2024 Women's Premier League. They finished third in the previous (inaugural) season after losing the Eliminator to Mumbai Indians.

UP Warriorz finished at the fourth place in the 2024 season's League stage.

== Squad ==
- Players with international caps are listed in **bold**.
- Ages as of 23 February 2024

Name	Nationality	Birth date	Batting style	Bowling style	Notes
Captain
**Alyssa Healy**	Australia	24 March 1990 (aged 33)	Right-handed	–	Overseas player
Batters
**Kiran Navgire**	India	18 September 1994 (aged 29)	Right-handed	Right-arm off break	
Shweta Sehrawat	India	26 February 2004 (aged 19)	Right-handed	Right-arm off break	
Dinesh Vrinda	India	2 March 2001 (aged 22)	Right-handed	Right-arm leg break	
**Danni Wyatt**	England	22 April 1991 (aged 32)	Right-handed	Right-arm off break	Overseas player
All-rounders
**Grace Harris**	Australia	18 September 1993 (aged 30)	Right-handed	Right-arm off break	Overseas player
Poonam Khemnar	India	9 May 1994 (aged 29)	Right-handed	Right-arm leg break	
**Tahlia McGrath**	Australia	10 November 1995 (aged 28)	Right-handed	Right-arm medium	Overseas player
**Deepti Sharma**	India	24 August 1997 (aged 26)	Left-handed	Right-arm off break	Vice-captain
Wicket-keepers
Laxmi Yadav	India	22 October 1997 (aged 26)	Right-handed	Right-arm medium	
Bowlers
**Lauren Bell**	England	2 January 2001 (aged 23)	Right-handed	Right-arm medium	Overseas player
Parshavi Chopra	India	10 May 2006 (aged 17)	Right-handed	Right-arm leg break	
**Sophie Ecclestone**	England	6 May 1999 (aged 24)	Right-handed	Slow left-arm orthodox	Overseas player
**Rajeshwari Gayakwad**	India	1 June 1991 (aged 32)	Right-handed	Slow left-arm orthodox	
**Anjali Sarvani**	India	28 July 1997 (aged 26)	Left-handed	Left-arm medium	
**Gouher Sultana**	India	31 March 1988 (aged 35)	Right-handed	Slow left-arm orthodox	
**Saima Thakor**	India	13 September 1996 (aged 27)	Right-handed	Right-arm medium	
Soppadhandi Yashasri	India	4 September 2003 (aged 20)	Right-handed	Right-arm medium	
Replacement players
**Chamari Athapaththu**	Sri Lanka	9 February 1990 (aged 34)	Left-handed	Right-arm off break	Overseas player
**Uma Chetry**	India	27 July 2002 (aged 21)	Right-handed	–	

== Support staff ==
Position	Name
Head coach	Jon Lewis
Assistant coach	Anju Jain
Bowling coach	Ashley Noffke
Mentor	Lisa Sthalekar

- Source: ESPNcricinfo

== Sponsors ==
- Main shirt sponsor: Kay Beauty
- Back shirt sponsor: EaseMyTrip

== League stage ==
Pos	Team	Pld	W	L	NR	Pts	NRR	
1	Delhi Capitals (R)	8	6	2	0	12	1.198	Advanced to the Final
2	Mumbai Indians (3rd)	8	5	3	0	10	0.024	Advanced to the Eliminator
3	Royal Challengers Bengaluru (C)	8	4	4	0	8	0.306	Advanced to the Eliminator
4	UP Warriorz	8	3	5	0	6	−0.371	
5	Gujarat Giants	8	2	6	0	4	−1.158	

Source: ESPNcricinfo
(C) Champions; (R) Runners-up

=== Fixtures and results ===
Match 2
24 February 2024
19:30 (N)
Scorecard

Royal Challengers Bangalore; 157/6 (20 overs)	v	UP Warriorz; 155/7 (20 overs)
Richa Ghosh 62 (37); Rajeshwari Gayakwad 2/24 (4 overs)		Grace Harris 38 (23); Sobhana Asha 5/22 (4 overs)

Royal Challengers Bangalore won by 2 runs
M. Chinnaswamy Stadium, Bengaluru
Umpires: Abhijit Bhattacharya and Narayanan Janani
Player of the match: Sobhana Asha (Royal Challengers Bangalore)

- UP Warriorz won the toss and elected to field.

Match 4
26 February 2024
19:30 (N)
Scorecard

UP Warriorz; 119/9 (20 overs)	v	Delhi Capitals; 123/1 (14.3 overs)
Shweta Sehrawat 45 (42); Radha Yadav 4/20 (4 overs)		Shafali Verma 64* (43); Sophie Ecclestone 1/31 (3.3 overs)

Delhi Capitals won by 9 wickets
M. Chinnaswamy Stadium, Bengaluru
Umpires: Mohit Krishnadas and Pashchim Pathak
Player of the match: Marizanne Kapp (Delhi Capitals)

- Delhi Capitals won the toss and elected to field.

Match 6
28 February 2024
19:30 (N)
Scorecard

Mumbai Indians; 161/6 (20 overs)	v	UP Warriorz; 163/3 (16.3 overs)
Hayley Matthews 55 (47); Grace Harris 1/20 (4 overs)		Kiran Navgire 57 (31); Issy Wong 2/30 (3 overs)

UP Warriorz won by 7 wickets
M. Chinnaswamy Stadium, Bengaluru
Umpires: Abhijeet Bengeri and Vrinda Rathi
Player of the match: Kiran Navgire (UP Warriorz)

- UP Warriorz won the toss and elected to field.

Match 8
1 March 2024
19:30 (N)
Scorecard

Gujarat Giants; 142/5 (20 overs)	v	UP Warriorz; 143/4 (15.4 overs)
Phoebe Litchfield 35 (26); Sophie Ecclestone 3/20 (4 overs)		Grace Harris 60* (33); Tanuja Kanwar 2/23 (3 overs)

UP Warriorz won by 6 wickets
M. Chinnaswamy Stadium, Bengaluru
Umpires: Puttarangaiah Jayapal and Gayathri Venugopalan
Player of the match: Grace Harris (UP Warriorz)

- UP Warriorz won the toss and elected to field.

Match 11
4 March 2024
19:30 (N)
Scorecard

Royal Challengers Bangalore; 198/3 (20 overs)	v	UP Warriorz; 175/8 (20 overs)
Smriti Mandhana 80 (50); Sophie Ecclestone 1/22 (4 overs)		Alyssa Healy 55 (38); Sobhana Asha 2/29 (4 overs); Sophie Molineux 2/29 (4 overs)

Royal Challengers Bangalore won by 23 runs
M. Chinnaswamy Stadium, Bengaluru
Umpires: Abhijeet Bengeri and Vrinda Rathi
Player of the match: Smriti Mandhana (Royal Challengers Bangalore)

- UP Warriorz won the toss and elected to field.

Match 14
7 March 2024
19:30 (N)
Scorecard

Mumbai Indians; 160/6 (20 overs)	v	UP Warriorz; 118/9 (20 overs)
Nat Sciver-Brunt 45 (31); Chamari Athapaththu 2/27 (4 overs)		Deepti Sharma 53* (36); Saika Ishaque 3/27 (4 overs)

Mumbai Indians won by 42 runs
Arun Jaitley Cricket Stadium, New Delhi
Umpires: Mohit Krishnadas and Pashchim Pathak
Player of the match: Nat Sciver-Brunt (Mumbai Indians)

- Mumbai Indians won the toss and elected to bat.

Match 15
8 March 2024
19:30 (N)
Scorecard

UP Warriorz; 138/8 (20 overs)	v	Delhi Capitals; 137 (19.5 overs)
Deepti Sharma 59 (48); Radha Yadav 2/16 (3 overs)		Meg Lanning 60 (46); Deepti Sharma 4/19 (4 overs)

UP Warriorz won by 1 run
Arun Jaitley Cricket Stadium, New Delhi
Umpires: Parashar Joshi and Mohamed Rafi
Player of the match: Deepti Sharma (Delhi Capitals)

- UP Warriorz won the toss and elected to bat.
- Deepti Sharma (UP Warriorz) became the first Indian bowler to take a hat-trick in the Women's Premier League.

Match 18
11 March 2024
19:30 (N)
Scorecard

Gujarat Giants; 152/8 (20 overs)	v	UP Warriorz; 144/5 (20 overs)
Beth Mooney 74* (52); Sophie Ecclestone 3/38 (4 overs)		Deepti Sharma 88* (60); Shabnam Shakil 3/11 (4 overs)

Gujarat Giants won by 8 runs
Arun Jaitley Cricket Stadium, New Delhi
Umpires: Puttarangaiah Jayapal and Gayathri Venugopalan
Player of the match: Shabnam Shakil (Gujarat Giants)

- Gujarat Giants won the toss and elected to bat.
