= 2024 Delhi Capitals (WPL) season =

WPL cricket team in 2024

Delhi Capitals
2024 season
- Coach: Jonathan Batty
- Captain: Meg Lanning
- WPL League: Qualified for Playoffs (Final)
- WPL Final: Runner-up
- Most runs: Meg Lanning (331)
- Most wickets: Marizanne Kapp (11)
- Most catches: Radha Yadav (6)
- Most wicket-keeping dismissals: Taniya Bhatia (5)

The 2024 season was the second season for the franchise Delhi Capitals. They were one of five teams that competed in the 2024 Women's Premier League. They were the runner-up of the previous (inaugural) season after losing the Final to Mumbai Indians.

Delhi Capitals direct qualified for the WPL Final as the League stage table topper for the consecutive 2nd year. Delhi Capitals lost the Final to Royal Challengers Bangalore finishing as the runner-up for the consecutive 2nd year.

== Squad ==
- Players with international caps are listed in **bold**
- Ages as of 23 February 2024

Name	Nationality	Birth date	Batting style	Bowling style	Notes
Batters
**Sneha Deepthi**	India	10 September 1996 (aged 27)	Right-handed	Right-arm off break	
Laura Harris	Australia	18 August 1990 (aged 33)	Right-handed	Slow left-arm orthodox	Overseas player
**Meg Lanning**	Australia	25 March 1992 (aged 31)	Right-handed	Right-arm medium	Captain. Overseas player
Aparna Mondal	India	2 June 1996 (aged 27)	Right-handed	–	
**Jemimah Rodrigues**	India	5 September 2000 (aged 23)	Right-handed	Right-arm off break	Vice-captain
**Shafali Verma**	India	28 January 2004 (aged 20)	Right-handed	Right-arm off break	
All-rounders
**Alice Capsey**	England	11 August 2004 (aged 19)	Right-handed	Right-arm off break	Overseas player
**Jess Jonassen**	Australia	5 November 1992 (aged 31)	Left-handed	Slow left-arm orthodox	Overseas player
**Marizanne Kapp**	South Africa	4 January 1990 (aged 34)	Right-handed	Right-arm medium	Overseas player
Ashwani Kumari	India	25 August 1997 (aged 26)	Right-handed	Right-arm medium	
**Minnu Mani**	India	24 March 1999 (aged 24)	Left-handed	Right-arm off break	
**Annabel Sutherland**	Australia	12 October 2001 (aged 22)	Right-handed	Right-arm medium	Overseas player
Wicket-keepers
**Taniya Bhatia**	India	28 November 1997 (aged 26)	Right-handed	–	
Bowlers
**Shikha Pandey**	India	12 May 1989 (aged 34)	Right-handed	Right-arm medium	
**Arundhati Reddy**	India	4 October 1997 (aged 26)	Right-handed	Right-arm medium	
Titas Sadhu	India	29 September 2004 (aged 19)	Right-handed	Right-arm medium	
**Poonam Yadav**	India	24 August 1991 (aged 32)	Right-handed	Right-arm leg break	
**Radha Yadav**	India	21 April 2000 (aged 23)	Right-handed	Slow left-arm orthodox	

== Support staff ==
Position	Name
Head coach	Jonathan Batty
Assistant coach	Hemlata Kala
Assistant coach	Lisa Keightley
Fielding coach	Biju George

- Source: Official website

== Sponsors ==
- Kit manufacturer: Puma
- Main shirt sponsor: DP World
- Back shirt sponsor: JSW Paints

== League stage ==
Pos	Team	Pld	W	L	NR	Pts	NRR	
1	Delhi Capitals (R)	8	6	2	0	12	1.198	Advanced to the Final
2	Mumbai Indians (3rd)	8	5	3	0	10	0.024	Advanced to the Eliminator
3	Royal Challengers Bengaluru (C)	8	4	4	0	8	0.306	Advanced to the Eliminator
4	UP Warriorz	8	3	5	0	6	−0.371	
5	Gujarat Giants	8	2	6	0	4	−1.158	

Source: ESPNcricinfo
(C) Champions; (R) Runners-up

=== Fixtures and results ===
Match 1
23 February 2024
20:00 (N)
Scorecard

Delhi Capitals; 171/5 (20 overs)	v	Mumbai Indians; 173/6 (20 overs)
Alice Capsey 75 (53); Nat Sciver-Brunt 2/33 (4 overs)		Yastika Bhatia 57 (45); Alice Capsey 2/23 (2 overs)

Mumbai Indians won by 4 wickets
M. Chinnaswamy Stadium, Bengaluru
Umpires: Abhijeet Bengeri and Vrinda Rathi
Player of the match: Harmanpreet Kaur (Mumbai Indians)

- Mumbai Indians won the toss and elected to field.

Match 4
26 February 2024
19:30 (N)
Scorecard

UP Warriorz; 119/9 (20 overs)	v	Delhi Capitals; 123/1 (14.3 overs)
Shweta Sehrawat 45 (42); Radha Yadav 4/20 (4 overs)		Shafali Verma 64* (43); Sophie Ecclestone 1/31 (3.3 overs)

Delhi Capitals won by 9 wickets
M. Chinnaswamy Stadium, Bengaluru
Umpires: Mohit Krishnadas and Pashchim Pathak
Player of the match: Marizanne Kapp (Delhi Capitals)

- Delhi Capitals won the toss and elected to field.

Match 7
29 February 2024
19:30 (N)
Scorecard

Delhi Capitals; 194/5 (20 overs)	v	Royal Challengers Bangalore; 169/9 (20 overs)
Shafali Verma 50 (31); Sophie Devine 2/23 (3 overs)		Smriti Mandhana 74 (43); Jess Jonassen 3/21 (4 overs)

Delhi Capitals won by 25 runs
M. Chinnaswamy Stadium, Bengaluru
Umpires: Abhijit Bhattacharya and Narayanan Janani
Player of the match: Marizanne Kapp (Delhi Capitals)

- Royal Challengers Bangalore won the toss and elected to field.

Match 10
3 March 2024
19:30 (N)
Scorecard

Delhi Capitals; 163/8 (20 overs)	v	Gujarat Giants; 138/8 (20 overs)
Meg Lanning 55 (41); Meghna Singh 4/37 (4 overs)		Ashleigh Gardner 40 (31); Radha Yadav 3/20 (4 overs)

Delhi Capitals won by 25 runs
M. Chinnaswamy Stadium, Bengaluru
Umpires: Parashar Joshi and Mohamed Rafi
Player of the match: Jess Jonassen (Delhi Capitals)

- Gujarat Giants won the toss and elected to field.
- Sayali Satghare (Gujarat Giants) replaced Dayalan Hemalatha as a concussion substitute in the second innings.

Match 12
5 March 2024
19:30 (N)
Scorecard

Delhi Capitals; 192/4 (20 overs)	v	Mumbai Indians; 163/8 (20 overs)
Jemimah Rodrigues 69* (33); Pooja Vastrakar 1/20 (4 overs)		Amanjot Kaur 42 (27); Jess Jonassen 3/21 (4 overs)

Delhi Capitals won by 29 runs
Arun Jaitley Cricket Stadium, New Delhi
Umpires: Abhijit Bhattacharya and Narayanan Janani
Player of the match: Jemimah Rodrigues (Delhi Capitals)

- Mumbai Indians won the toss and elected to field.

Match 15
8 March 2024
19:30 (N)
Scorecard

UP Warriorz; 138/8 (20 overs)	v	Delhi Capitals; 137 (19.5 overs)
Deepti Sharma 59 (48); Radha Yadav 2/16 (3 overs)		Meg Lanning 60 (46); Deepti Sharma 4/19 (4 overs)

UP Warriorz won by 1 run
Arun Jaitley Cricket Stadium, New Delhi
Umpires: Parashar Joshi and Mohamed Rafi
Player of the match: Deepti Sharma (Delhi Capitals)

- UP Warriorz won the toss and elected to bat.
- Deepti Sharma (UP Warriorz) became the first Indian bowler to take a hat-trick in the Women's Premier League.

Match 17
10 March 2024
19:30 (N)
Scorecard

Delhi Capitals; 181/5 (20 overs)	v	Royal Challengers Bangalore; 180/7 (20 overs)
Jemimah Rodrigues 58 (36); Shreyanka Patil 4/26 (4 overs)		Richa Ghosh 51 (29); Alice Capsey 1/5 (1 over)

Delhi Capitals won by 1 run
Arun Jaitley Cricket Stadium, New Delhi
Umpires: Abhijit Bhattacharya and Narayanan Janani
Player of the match: Jemimah Rodrigues (Delhi Capitals)

- Delhi Capitals won the toss and elected to bat.
- Delhi Capitals qualified for the playoffs as a result of this match.

Match 20
13 March 2024
19:30 (N)
Scorecard

Gujarat Giants; 126/9 (20 overs)	v	Delhi Capitals; 129/3 (13.1 overs)
Bharti Fulmali 42 (36); Minnu Mani 2/9 (2 overs)		Shafali Verma 71 (37); Tanuja Kanwar 2/20 (4 overs)

Delhi Capitals won by 7 wickets
Arun Jaitley Cricket Stadium, New Delhi
Umpires: Parashar Joshi and Mohamed Rafi
Player of the match: Shafali Verma (Delhi Capitals)

- Gujarat Giants won the toss and elected to bat.

== Playoffs ==
Eliminator			Final
			1	Delhi Capitals	113 (18.3 overs)
2	Mumbai Indians	130/6 (20 overs)	EW	Royal Challengers Bengaluru	115/2 (19.3 overs)
3	Royal Challengers Bengaluru	135/6 (20 overs)

=== Final ===
Final
17 March 2024
19:30 (N)
Scorecard

Delhi Capitals; 113 (18.3 overs)	v	Royal Challengers Bengaluru; 115/2 (19.3 overs)
Shafali Verma 44 (27); Shreyanka Patil 4/12 (3.3 overs)		Ellyse Perry 35* (37); Shikha Pandey 1/11 (4 overs)

Royal Challengers Bengaluru won by 8 wickets
Arun Jaitley Cricket Stadium, New Delhi
Umpires: Abhijit Bhattacharya and Gayathri Venugopalan
Player of the match: Sophie Molineux (Royal Challengers Bengaluru)

- Delhi Capitals won the toss and elected to bat.
