= 2024 Gujarat Giants (WPL) season =

WPL cricket team in 2024

Gujarat Giants
2024 season
- Coach: Michael Klinger
- Captain: Beth Mooney
- WPL League: Finished at the 5th place
- Most runs: Beth Mooney (285)
- Most wickets: Tanuja Kanwar (10)
- Most catches: Ashleigh Gardner (4)
- Most wicket-keeping dismissals: Beth Mooney (2)

The 2024 season was the second season for the franchise Gujarat Giants. They were one of five teams that competed in the 2024 Women's Premier League. They finished at the last place in the previous (inaugural) season's League stage.

Gujarat Giants finished at the last place in WPL League stage for the consecutive 2nd year.

== Squad ==
- Players with international caps are listed in **bold**
- Ages as of 23 February 2024

Name	Nationality	Birth date	Batting style	Bowling style	Notes
Captain / Wicket-keeper
**Beth Mooney**	Australia	14 January 1994 (aged 30)	Left-handed	–	Overseas player
Batters
**Harleen Deol**	India	21 June 1998 (aged 25)	Right-handed	Right-arm leg break	
**Bharti Fulmali**	India	11 October 1994 (aged 29)	Right-handed	Right-arm medium	
**Veda Krishnamurthy**	India	16 October 1992 (aged 31)	Right-handed	Right-arm leg break	
**Phoebe Litchfield**	Australia	18 April 2003 (aged 20)	Right-handed	Right-arm leg break	Overseas player
Trisha Poojitha	India	14 July 2002 (aged 21)	Right-handed	Right-arm medium	
**Laura Wolvaardt**	South Africa	26 April 1999 (aged 24)	Right-handed	–	Overseas player
All-rounders
**Kathryn Bryce**	Scotland	17 November 1997 (aged 26)	Right-handed	Right-arm medium	Overseas player
**Ashleigh Gardner**	Australia	15 April 1997 (aged 26)	Right-handed	Right-arm off break	Overseas player
**Dayalan Hemalatha**	India	29 September 1994 (aged 29)	Right-handed	Right-arm off break	
Tarannum Pathan	India	8 October 1993 (aged 30)	Right-handed	Right-arm off break	
**Sneh Rana**	India	18 February 1994 (aged 30)	Right-handed	Right-arm off break	Vice-captain
Sayali Satghare	India	2 July 2000 (aged 23)	Right-handed	Right-arm medium	
Bowlers
Kashvee Gautam	India	18 April 2003 (aged 20)	Right-handed	Right-arm medium	
Tanuja Kanwer	India	28 January 1998 (aged 26)	Left-handed	Left-arm medium	
Mannat Kashyap	India	15 December 2003 (aged 20)	Left-handed	Slow left-arm orthodox	
Priya Mishra	India	4 June 2004 (aged 19)	Right-handed	Right-arm medium	
Shabnam Shakil	India	17 June 2007 (aged 16)	Right-handed	Right-arm medium	
**Lea Tahuhu**	New Zealand	23 September 1990 (aged 33)	Right-handed	Right-arm medium	Overseas player
Meghna Singh	India	18 June 1994 (aged 29)	Right-handed	Right-arm medium	

== Support staff ==
Position	Name
Head coach	Michael Klinger
Batting coach	Tushar Arothe
Bowling coach	Nooshin Al Khadeer
Fielding coach	Gavan Twining
Mentor	Mithali Raj

- Source: Official website

== Sponsors ==
- Kit manufacturer: T10 Sports
- Main shirt sponsor: Ambuja Cement
- Back shirt sponsor: Fortune

== League stage ==
Pos	Team	Pld	W	L	NR	Pts	NRR	
1	Delhi Capitals (R)	8	6	2	0	12	1.198	Advanced to the Final
2	Mumbai Indians (3rd)	8	5	3	0	10	0.024	Advanced to the Eliminator
3	Royal Challengers Bangalore (C)	8	4	4	0	8	0.306	Advanced to the Eliminator
4	UP Warriorz	8	3	5	0	6	−0.371	
5	Gujarat Giants	8	2	6	0	4	−1.158	

Source: ESPNcricinfo
(C) Champions; (R) Runners-up

=== Fixtures and results ===
Match 3
25 February 2024
19:30 (N)
Scorecard

Gujarat Giants; 126/9 (20 overs)	v	Mumbai Indians; 129/5 (18.1 overs)
Tanuja Kanwar 28 (21); Amelia Kerr 4/17 (4 overs)		Harmanpreet Kaur 46* (41); Tanuja Kanwar 2/21 (4 overs)

Mumbai Indians won by 5 wickets
M. Chinnaswamy Stadium, Bengaluru
Umpires: Puttarangaiah Jayapal and Gayathri Venugopalan
Player of the match: Amelia Kerr (Mumbai Indians)

- Mumbai Indians won the toss and elected to field.

Match 5
27 February 2024
19:30 (N)
Scorecard

Gujarat Giants; 107/7 (20 overs)	v	Royal Challengers Bangalore; 110/2 (12.3 overs)
Dayalan Hemalatha 31* (25); Sophie Molineux 3/25 (4 overs)		Smriti Mandhana 43 (27); Ashleigh Gardner 1/15 (3 overs)

Royal Challengers Bangalore won by 8 wickets
M. Chinnaswamy Stadium, Bengaluru
Umpires: Parashar Joshi and Mohamed Rafi
Player of the match: Renuka Singh (Royal Challengers Bangalore)

- Royal Challengers Bangalore won the toss and elected to field.

Match 8
1 March 2024
19:30 (N)
Scorecard

Gujarat Giants; 142/5 (20 overs)	v	UP Warriorz; 143/4 (15.4 overs)
Phoebe Litchfield 35 (26); Sophie Ecclestone 3/20 (4 overs)		Grace Harris 60* (33); Tanuja Kanwar 2/23 (3 overs)

UP Warriorz won by 6 wickets
M. Chinnaswamy Stadium, Bengaluru
Umpires: Puttarangaiah Jayapal and Gayathri Venugopalan
Player of the match: Grace Harris (UP Warriorz)

- UP Warriorz won the toss and elected to field.

Match 10
3 March 2024
19:30 (N)
Scorecard

Delhi Capitals; 163/8 (20 overs)	v	Gujarat Giants; 138/8 (20 overs)
Meg Lanning 55 (41); Meghna Singh 4/37 (4 overs)		Ashleigh Gardner 40 (31); Radha Yadav 3/20 (4 overs)

Delhi Capitals won by 25 runs
M. Chinnaswamy Stadium, Bengaluru
Umpires: Parashar Joshi and Mohamed Rafi
Player of the match: Jess Jonassen (Delhi Capitals)

- Gujarat Giants won the toss and elected to field.
- Sayali Satghare (Gujarat Giants) replaced Dayalan Hemalatha as a concussion substitute in the second innings.

Match 13
6 March 2024
19:30 (N)
Scorecard

Gujarat Giants; 199/5 (20 overs)	v	Royal Challengers Bangalore; 180/8 (20 overs)
Beth Mooney 85* (51); Sophie Molineux 1/32 (4 overs)		Georgia Wareham 48 (22); Ashleigh Gardner 2/23 (4 overs)

Gujarat Giants won by 19 runs
Arun Jaitley Cricket Stadium, New Delhi
Umpires: Puttarangaiah Jayapal and Gayathri Venugopalan
Player of the match: Beth Mooney (Gujarat Giants)

- Gujarat Giants won the toss and elected to bat.

Match 16
9 March 2024
19:30 (N)
Scorecard

Gujarat Giants; 190/7 (20 overs)	v	Mumbai Indians; 191/3 (19.5 overs)
Dayalan Hemalatha 74 (40); Saika Ishaque 2/31 (4 overs)		Harmanpreet Kaur 95* (48); Tanuja Kanwar 1/21 (4 overs)

Mumbai Indians won by 7 wickets
Arun Jaitley Cricket Stadium, New Delhi
Umpires: Abhijeet Bengeri and Vrinda Rathi
Player of the match: Harmanpreet Kaur (Mumbai Indians)

- Gujarat Giants won the toss and elected to bat.
- Mumbai Indians qualified for the playoffs as a result of this match.

Match 18
11 March 2024
19:30 (N)
Scorecard

Gujarat Giants; 152/8 (20 overs)	v	UP Warriorz; 144/5 (20 overs)
Beth Mooney 74* (52); Sophie Ecclestone 3/38 (4 overs)		Deepti Sharma 88* (60); Shabnam Shakil 3/11 (4 overs)

Gujarat Giants won by 8 runs
Arun Jaitley Cricket Stadium, New Delhi
Umpires: Puttarangaiah Jayapal and Gayathri Venugopalan
Player of the match: Shabnam Shakil (Gujarat Giants)

- Gujarat Giants won the toss and elected to bat.

Match 20
13 March 2024
19:30 (N)
Scorecard

Gujarat Giants; 126/9 (20 overs)	v	Delhi Capitals; 129/3 (13.1 overs)
Bharti Fulmali 42 (36); Minnu Mani 2/9 (2 overs)		Shafali Verma 71 (37); Tanuja Kanwar 2/20 (4 overs)

Delhi Capitals won by 7 wickets
Arun Jaitley Cricket Stadium, New Delhi
Umpires: Parashar Joshi and Mohamed Rafi
Player of the match: Shafali Verma (Delhi Capitals)

- Gujarat Giants won the toss and elected to bat.
