= 2027 Women's Premier League (cricket) =

Fifth edition of the Women's Premier League

- Dates: 14 January – 7 February 2027
- Administrator: Board of Control for Cricket in India
- Cricket format: Twenty20 cricket
- Tournament format(s): Double Round robin and playoffs
- Participants: 5
- Matches: 22
- Official website: wplt20.com

The 2027 Women's Premier League (also known as WPL 2027) will be the fifth season of the Women's Premier League, a women's franchise Twenty20 cricket league in India. The tournament, featuring five teams, will take place from 14 January to 7 February 2027. The Royal Challengers Bangalore are the defending champions.

A mini auction for the season was held on 28 October 2026 in Kochi.

== Background ==
The Women's Premier League, a women's Twenty20 franchise cricket tournament organised by the Board of Control for Cricket in India (BCCI). The tournament run from 14 January to 7 February 2027.

The retained players were announced on 28 September 2026. The auction took place on 28 October 2026 in Kochi.

=== Schedule ===
On 4 November 2026, the Board of Control for Cricket in India (BCCI) announced the schedule for the fifth season of the Women's Premier League. The tournament was scheduled to be held from 14 January to 7 February 2027, with 22 matches, including the playoffs, taking place across two venues: Vadodara and Mumbai. The opening match feature defending champions Royal Challengers Bengaluru against Mumbai Indians on 14 January 2027 at Vadodara. The Vadodara leg was scheduled to run until 24 January, before the tournament moved to Mumbai on 26 January. The league stage concluded on 3 February, followed by the Eliminator on 5 February and the final on 7 February 2027 at the Wankhede Stadium in Mumbai.

=== Format ===
The tournament involves each team playing every other team twice in a home-and-away, double round-robin format. After the double round-robin league, the top three teams qualify for the playoffs based on aggregate points. The team with the highest points will automatically qualify for the final match. The second and third-placed teams will compete with each other (in a match titled "Eliminator"). The winner of the Eliminator match will move on to the final match.

== Teams and venues ==
| Team | Captain | Head coach |
|---|---|---|
| Delhi Capitals | Jemimah Rodrigues | Jonathan Batty |
| Gujarat Giants | Ashleigh Gardner | Michael Klinger |
| Mumbai Indians | Harmanpreet Kaur | Luke Williams |
| Royal Challengers Bengaluru | Smriti Mandhana | Malolan Rangarajan |
| UP Warriorz | Meg Lanning | Abhishek Nayar |

The tournament was played across Mumbai and Vadodara, with the Baroda Cricket Association Stadium in Baroda hosting the opening match and the Wankhede Stadium in Mumbai hosting the later stages, including the final.

| Mumbai | Vadodara |
|---|---|
| Wankhede Stadium | Baroda Cricket Association Stadium |
| Capacity: 33,100 | Capacity: 40,000 |

== Squads ==
The player auction took place on 28 October 2026.

| Delhi Capitals | Gujarat Giants | Mumbai Indians | Royal Challengers Bangalore | UP Warriorz |
|---|---|---|---|---|
| Jemimah Rodrigues (c); Shree Charani; Kirstie Gordon; Lucy Hamilton; Chinelle Henry; Marizanne Kapp; Uma Kashvi; Nazma Khan; Madiwala Mamatha; Minnu Mani; Kiran Navgire; Niki Prasad; Nandani Sharma; Annabel Sutherland; Shafali Verma; Laura Wolvaardt; Deeya Yadav | Ashleigh Gardner (c); Kanika Ahuja; Yastika Bhatia; Sophie Devine; Bharti Fulmali; Kim Garth; Kashvee Gautam; Rajeshwari Gayakwad; Jintimani Kalita; Gunalan Kamalini; Tanuja Kanwar; Happy Kumari; Beth Mooney; Orla Prendergast; Samaira Raghav; Anushka Sharma; Renuka Singh; Georgia Wareham | Harmanpreet Kaur (c); Akshita Bhagat; Nicola Carey; Sanika Chalke; Rahila Firdous; Sanskriti Gupta; Latika Inamdar; Shabnim Ismail; Disha Kasat; Amanjot Kaur; Amelia Kerr; Hayley Matthews; Tara Norris; Bharti Rawal; Sajeevan Sajana; Nat Sciver-Brunt; Shweta Sehrawat; Vaishnavi Sharma | Smriti Mandhana (c); Lauren Bell; Vrinda Dinesh; Richa Ghosh; Tejal Hasabnis; Jess Jonassen; Nadine de Klerk; Shreyanka Patil; Ellyse Perry; Kumar Prathyoosha; Prema Rawat; Arundhati Reddy; Sayali Satghare; Chloe Tryon; Pooja Vastrakar; Georgia Voll; Radha Yadav | Meg Lanning (c); Kathryn Bryce; Manali Dakshini; Harleen Deol; Sophie Ecclestone; Kranti Gaud; Shipra Giri; Grace Harris; Phoebe Litchfield; Sophie Molineux; Shikha Pandey; Sahana Pawar; Sneh Rana; Pratika Rawal; Simran Shaikh; Deepti Sharma; Asha Sobhana; Sushma Verma |

== Standing ==
=== Points table ===
| Pos | Team | Pld | W | L | Pts | NRR | Qualification |
|---|---|---|---|---|---|---|---|
| 1 | Delhi Capitals | 0 | 0 | 0 | 0 | — | Advanced to the Final |
| 2 | Gujarat Giants | 0 | 0 | 0 | 0 | — | Advanced to the Eliminator |
| 3 | Mumbai Indians | 0 | 0 | 0 | 0 | — | Advanced to the Eliminator |
| 4 | Royal Challengers Bengaluru | 0 | 0 | 0 | 0 | — | |
| 5 | UP Warriorz | 0 | 0 | 0 | 0 | — | |

First match(es) will be played: 14 January 2027. Source: Cricinfo

=== Match summary ===
| Team | Group matches | Playoffs |
| Team | E | F |

| Win | Loss | No result |

- Note: The total points at the end of each group match are listed.
- Note: Click on the points (group matches) or W/L (playoffs) to see the match summary.

Visitor team →
Home team ↓

- Note: Results listed are according to the home (horizontal) and visitor (vertical) teams.
- Note: Click on a result to see a summary of the match.

== Fixtures ==
The fixtures were announced on 4 November 2026.

Match 1
14 January
19:30 (N)

| Royal Challengers Bengaluru | v | Mumbai Indians |

BCA Stadium, Vadodara

Match 2
15 January
19:30 (N)

| Gujarat Giants | v | UP Warriorz |

BCA Stadium, Vadodara

Match 3
16 January
19:30 (N)

| Delhi Capitals | v | Royal Challengers Bengaluru |

BCA Stadium, Vadodara

Match 4
17 January
19:30 (N)

| UP Warriorz | v | Mumbai Indians |

BCA Stadium, Vadodara

Match 5
18 January
19:30 (N)

| Gujarat Giants | v | Delhi Capitals |

BCA Stadium, Vadodara

Match 6
19 January
19:30 (N)

| Royal Challengers Bengaluru | v | UP Warriorz |

BCA Stadium, Vadodara

Match 7
20 January
19:30 (N)

| Gujarat Giants | v | Mumbai Indians |

BCA Stadium, Vadodara

Match 8
21 January
19:30 (N)

| UP Warriorz | v | Delhi Capitals |

BCA Stadium, Vadodara

Match 9
22 January
19:30 (N)

| Gujarat Giants | v | Royal Challengers Bengaluru |

BCA Stadium, Vadodara

Match 10
23 January
19:30 (N)

| Delhi Capitals | v | Mumbai Indians |

BCA Stadium, Vadodara

Match 11
24 January
19:30 (N)

| UP Warriorz | v | Gujarat Giants |

BCA Stadium, Vadodara

Match 12
26 January
19:30 (N)

| Mumbai Indians | v | Royal Challengers Bengaluru |

Wankhede Stadium, Mumbai

Match 13
27 January
19:30 (N)

| Delhi Capitals | v | Gujarat Giants |

Wankhede Stadium, Mumbai

Match 14
28 January
19:30 (N)

| Mumbai Indians | v | UP Warriorz |

Wankhede Stadium, Mumbai

Match 15
29 January
19:30 (N)

| Royal Challengers Bengaluru | v | Delhi Capitals |

Wankhede Stadium, Mumbai

Match 16
30 January
19:30 (N)

| Mumbai Indians | v | Gujarat Giants |

Wankhede Stadium, Mumbai

Match 17
31 January
19:30 (N)

| UP Warriorz | v | Royal Challengers Bengaluru |

Wankhede Stadium, Mumbai

Match 18
1 February
19:30 (N)

| Mumbai Indians | v | Delhi Capitals |

Wankhede Stadium, Mumbai

Match 19
2 February
19:30 (N)

| Royal Challengers Bengaluru | v | Gujarat Giants |

Wankhede Stadium, Mumbai

Match 20
3 February
19:30 (N)

| Delhi Capitals | v | UP Warriorz |

Wankhede Stadium, Mumbai

== Playoffs ==
=== Bracket ===
| Eliminator | Final |
| | 1 |
| 2 | EW |
| 3 |

=== Eliminator ===
Eliminator
5 February 2027
19:30 (N)

| Second-placed team | v | Third-placed team |

Wankhede Stadium, Mumbai

- The winner of this match will qualify for the final.

=== Final ===
Final
7 February 2027
19:30 (N)

| First-placed team | v | Eliminator winner |

Wankhede Stadium, Mumbai

== Statistics ==
Most runs
| Runs | Player | Team |

Most wickets
| Wickets | Player | Team |

Most Valuable Player
| Points | Player | Team |
