= 2024 Women's Premier League (cricket) =

Second edition of the Women's Premier League

- Dates: 23 February – 17 March 2024
- Administrator: Board of Control for Cricket in India
- Cricket format: Twenty20 cricket
- Tournament format(s): Double Round robin and playoffs
- Champions: Royal Challengers Bangalore (1st title)
- Runners-up: Delhi Capitals
- Participants: 5
- Matches: 22
- Player of the series: (India) Deepti Sharma (UP Warriorz)
- Most runs: (Australia) Ellyse Perry (Royal Challengers Bangalore) (347)
- Most wickets: (India) Shreyanka Patil (Royal Challengers Bangalore) (13)
- Official website: wplt20.com

The 2024 Women's Premier League (also known as WPL 2024 and branded as TATA WPL 2024) was the second season of the Women's Premier League, a women's franchise Twenty20 cricket league organised by the Board of Control for Cricket in India (BCCI). The tournament, featuring five teams, was held from 23 February to 17 March 2024.

Royal Challengers Bangalore won the title after defeating Delhi Capitals in the final. This was Royal Challengers franchise's maiden title across both men's and women's tournaments.

== Format ==
Five teams are scheduled to play in 2024. The tournament involves each team playing every other team twice in a home-and-away, double round-robin format. After the double round-robin league, the top three teams qualify for the playoffs based on aggregate points. The team with the highest points will automatically qualify for the final match. The second and third-placed teams will compete with each other (in a match titled "Eliminator"). The winner of the Eliminator match will move on to the final match.

=== Schedule ===
The schedule of the first phase of the IPL 2024 was announced on 24 January 2024. The opening match of the tournament was played between the defending champions Mumbai Indians and the Delhi Capitals on 23 February 2024 at the M. Chinnaswamy Stadium, Bengaluru. The final match was played on 17 March 2024 at the Arun Jaitley Stadium, Delhi with Royal Challengers Bangalore defeating the Delhi Capitals by 8 wickets.

== Personnel changes ==
A total of 30 players were sold during the auction, nine of whom were from overseas.

Name	National team	Team	Price
Annabel Sutherland	Australia	Delhi Capitals	₹2 crore (US$210,000)
Aparna Mondal	India	Delhi Capitals	₹10 lakh (US$10,000)
Ashwani Kumari	India	Delhi Capitals	₹10 lakh (US$10,000)
Kashvee Gautam	India	Gujarat Giants	₹2 crore (US$210,000)
Phoebe Litchfield	Australia	Gujarat Giants	₹1 crore (US$100,000)
Meghna Singh	India	Gujarat Giants	₹30 lakh (US$31,000)
Lauren Cheatle	Australia	Gujarat Giants	₹30 lakh (US$31,000)
Veda Krishnamurthy	India	Gujarat Giants	₹30 lakh (US$31,000)
Priya Mishra	India	Gujarat Giants	₹20 lakh (US$21,000)
Trisha Poojitha	India	Gujarat Giants	₹10 lakh (US$10,000)
Kathryn Bryce	Scotland	Gujarat Giants	₹10 lakh (US$10,000)
Mannat Kashyap	India	Gujarat Giants	₹10 lakh (US$10,000)
Tarannum Pathan	India	Gujarat Giants	₹10 lakh (US$10,000)
Shabnim Ismail	South Africa	Mumbai Indians	₹1.2 crore (US$120,000)
Sajeevan Sajana	India	Mumbai Indians	₹15 lakh (US$16,000)
Amandeep Kaur	India	Mumbai Indians	₹10 lakh (US$10,000)
Fathima Jaffer	India	Mumbai Indians	₹10 lakh (US$10,000)
Keerthana Balakrishnan	India	Mumbai Indians	₹10 lakh (US$10,000)
Ekta Bisht	India	Royal Challengers Bangalore	₹60 lakh (US$62,000)
Georgia Wareham	Australia	Royal Challengers Bangalore	₹40 lakh (US$42,000)
Kate Cross	England	Royal Challengers Bangalore	₹30 lakh (US$31,000)
Sabbhineni Meghana	India	Royal Challengers Bangalore	₹30 lakh (US$31,000)
Simran Bahadur	India	Royal Challengers Bangalore	₹30 lakh (US$31,000)
Sophie Molineux	Australia	Royal Challengers Bangalore	₹30 lakh (US$31,000)
Shubha Satheesh	India	Royal Challengers Bangalore	₹10 lakh (US$10,000)
Vrinda Dinesh	India	UP Warriorz	₹1.3 crore (US$130,000)
Danni Wyatt	England	UP Warriorz	₹30 lakh (US$31,000)
Gouher Sultana	India	UP Warriorz	₹30 lakh (US$31,000)
Poonam Khemnar	India	UP Warriorz	₹10 lakh (US$10,000)
Saima Thakor	India	UP Warriorz	₹10 lakh (US$10,000)

== Teams and venues ==
Teams
- Delhi Capitals; Gujarat Giants; Mumbai Indians; Royal Challengers Bangalore; UP Warriorz

Matches were played at the M. Chinnaswamy Stadium in Bengaluru and Arun Jaitley Cricket Stadium in New Delhi, with the latter to host the knockout stages.

Bengaluru	2024 Women's Premier League (cricket) is located in India	Delhi
M. Chinnaswamy Stadium	2024 Women's Premier League (cricket) is located in India	Arun Jaitley Stadium
Capacity: 35,000	2024 Women's Premier League (cricket) is located in India	Capacity: 35,200

== Opening ceremony ==
The opening ceremony took place on 23 February at M. Chinnaswamy Stadium in Bengaluru, with Shah Rukh Khan, Shahid Kapoor, Kartik Aaryan, Varun Dhawan, Sidharth Malhotra and Tiger Shroff performing.

== League stage ==
=== Points table ===
Pos	Team	Pld	W	L	NR	Pts	NRR	
1	Delhi Capitals (R)	8	6	2	0	12	1.198	Advanced to the Final
2	Mumbai Indians (3rd)	8	5	3	0	10	0.024	Advanced to the Eliminator
3	Royal Challengers Bangalore (C)	8	4	4	0	8	0.306	Advanced to the Eliminator
4	UP Warriorz	8	3	5	0	6	−0.371	
5	Gujarat Giants	8	2	6	0	4	−1.158	

Source: ESPNcricinfo
(C) Champions; (R) Runners-up

=== Match summary ===
Team	Group matches								Playoffs	
Team	1	2	3	4	5	6	7	8	E	F
Delhi Capitals	0	2	4	6	8	8	10	12		L
Gujarat Giants	0	0	0	0	2	2	4	4		
Mumbai Indians	2	4	4	6	6	8	10	10	L	
Royal Challengers Bengaluru	2	4	4	4	6	6	6	8	W	W
UP Warriorz	0	0	2	4	4	4	6	6		

Win	Loss	No result

- Note: The total points at the end of each group match are listed.
- Note: Click on the points (group matches) or W/L (playoffs) to see the match summary.

Visitor team →	DC	GG	MI	RCB	UPW
Home team ↓	DC	GG	MI	RCB	UPW
Delhi Capitals		Delhi; 7 wickets	Delhi; 29 runs	Delhi; 1 run	Lucknow; 1 run
Gujarat Giants	Delhi; 25 runs		Mumbai; 5 wickets	Gujarat; 19 runs	Gujarat; 8 runs
Mumbai Indians	Mumbai; 4 wickets	Mumbai; 7 wickets		Bengaluru; 7 wickets	Lucknow; 7 wickets
Royal Challengers Bengaluru	Delhi; 25 runs	Bengaluru; 8 wickets	Mumbai; 7 wickets		Bengaluru; 2 runs
UP Warriorz	Delhi; 9 wickets	Lucknow; 6 wickets	Mumbai; 42 runs	Bengaluru; 23 runs	

Home team won	Visitor team won

- Note: Results listed are according to the home (horizontal) and visitor (vertical) teams.
- Note: Click on a result to see a summary of the match.

=== Fixtures ===
The BCCI released all the fixtures on 24 January 2024.

Match 1
23 February 2024
20:00 (N)
Scorecard

Delhi Capitals; 171/5 (20 overs)	v	Mumbai Indians; 173/6 (20 overs)
Alice Capsey 75 (53); Nat Sciver-Brunt 2/33 (4 overs)		Yastika Bhatia 57 (45); Alice Capsey 2/23 (2 overs)

Mumbai Indians won by 4 wickets
M. Chinnaswamy Stadium, Bengaluru
Umpires: Abhijeet Bengeri and Vrinda Rathi
Player of the match: Harmanpreet Kaur (Mumbai Indians)

- Mumbai Indians won the toss and elected to field.

Match 2
24 February 2024
19:30 (N)
Scorecard

Royal Challengers Bangalore; 157/6 (20 overs)	v	UP Warriorz; 155/7 (20 overs)
Richa Ghosh 62 (37); Rajeshwari Gayakwad 2/24 (4 overs)		Grace Harris 38 (23); Asha Sobhana 5/22 (4 overs)

Royal Challengers Bangalore won by 2 runs
M. Chinnaswamy Stadium, Bengaluru
Umpires: Abhijit Bhattacharya and Narayanan Janani
Player of the match: Asha Sobhana (Royal Challengers Bengaluru)

- UP Warriorz won the toss and elected to field.

Match 3
25 February 2024
19:30 (N)
Scorecard

Gujarat Giants; 126/9 (20 overs)	v	Mumbai Indians; 129/5 (18.1 overs)
Tanuja Kanwar 28 (21); Amelia Kerr 4/17 (4 overs)		Harmanpreet Kaur 46* (41); Tanuja Kanwar 2/21 (4 overs)

Mumbai Indians won by 5 wickets
M. Chinnaswamy Stadium, Bengaluru
Umpires: Puttarangaiah Jayapal and Gayathri Venugopalan
Player of the match: Amelia Kerr (Mumbai Indians)

- Mumbai Indians won the toss and elected to field.

Match 4
26 February 2024
19:30 (N)
Scorecard

UP Warriorz; 119/9 (20 overs)	v	Delhi Capitals; 123/1 (14.3 overs)
Shweta Sehrawat 45 (42); Radha Yadav 4/20 (4 overs)		Shafali Verma 64* (43); Sophie Ecclestone 1/31 (3.3 overs)

Delhi Capitals won by 9 wickets
M. Chinnaswamy Stadium, Bengaluru
Umpires: Mohit Krishnadas and Pashchim Pathak
Player of the match: Marizanne Kapp (Delhi Capitals)

- Delhi Capitals won the toss and elected to field.

Match 5
27 February 2024
19:30 (N)
Scorecard

Gujarat Giants; 107/7 (20 overs)	v	Royal Challengers Bangalore; 110/2 (12.3 overs)
Dayalan Hemalatha 31* (25); Sophie Molineux 3/25 (4 overs)		Smriti Mandhana 43 (27); Ashleigh Gardner 1/15 (3 overs)

Royal Challengers Bangalore won by 8 wickets
M. Chinnaswamy Stadium, Bengaluru
Umpires: Parashar Joshi and Mohamed Rafi
Player of the match: Renuka Singh (Royal Challengers Bangalore)

- Royal Challengers Bangalore won the toss and elected to field.

Match 6
28 February 2024
19:30 (N)
Scorecard

Mumbai Indians; 161/6 (20 overs)	v	UP Warriorz; 163/3 (16.3 overs)
Hayley Matthews 55 (47); Grace Harris 1/20 (4 overs)		Kiran Navgire 57 (31); Issy Wong 2/30 (3 overs)

UP Warriorz won by 7 wickets
M. Chinnaswamy Stadium, Bengaluru
Umpires: Abhijeet Bengeri and Vrinda Rathi
Player of the match: Kiran Navgire (UP Warriorz)

- UP Warriorz won the toss and elected to field.

Match 7
29 February 2024
19:30 (N)
Scorecard

Delhi Capitals; 194/5 (20 overs)	v	Royal Challengers Bangalore; 169/9 (20 overs)
Shafali Verma 50 (31); Sophie Devine 2/23 (3 overs)		Smriti Mandhana 74 (43); Jess Jonassen 3/21 (4 overs)

Delhi Capitals won by 25 runs
M. Chinnaswamy Stadium, Bengaluru
Umpires: Abhijit Bhattacharya and Narayanan Janani
Player of the match: Marizanne Kapp (Delhi Capitals)

- Royal Challengers Bangalore won the toss and elected to field.

Match 8
1 March 2024
19:30 (N)
Scorecard

Gujarat Giants; 142/5 (20 overs)	v	UP Warriorz; 143/4 (15.4 overs)
Phoebe Litchfield 35 (26); Sophie Ecclestone 3/20 (4 overs)		Grace Harris 60* (33); Tanuja Kanwar 2/23 (3 overs)

UP Warriorz won by 6 wickets
M. Chinnaswamy Stadium, Bengaluru
Umpires: Puttarangaiah Jayapal and Gayathri Venugopalan
Player of the match: Grace Harris (UP Warriorz)

- UP Warriorz won the toss and elected to field.

Match 9
2 March 2024
19:30 (N)
Scorecard

Royal Challengers Bangalore; 131/6 (20 overs)	v	Mumbai Indians; 133/3 (15.1 overs)
Ellyse Perry 44* (38); Pooja Vastrakar 2/14 (3 overs)		Amelia Kerr 40* (24); Shreyanka Patil 1/15 (2 overs)

Mumbai Indians won by 7 wickets
M. Chinnaswamy Stadium, Bengaluru
Umpires: Mohit Krishnadas and Pashchim Pathak
Player of the match: Amelia Kerr (Mumbai Indians)

- Mumbai Indians won the toss and elected to field.

Match 10
3 March 2024
19:30 (N)
Scorecard

Delhi Capitals; 163/8 (20 overs)	v	Gujarat Giants; 138/8 (20 overs)
Meg Lanning 55 (41); Meghna Singh 4/37 (4 overs)		Ashleigh Gardner 40 (31); Radha Yadav 3/20 (4 overs)

Delhi Capitals won by 25 runs
M. Chinnaswamy Stadium, Bengaluru
Umpires: Parashar Joshi and Mohamed Rafi
Player of the match: Jess Jonassen (Delhi Capitals)

- Gujarat Giants won the toss and elected to field.
- Sayali Satghare (Gujarat Giants) replaced Dayalan Hemalatha as a concussion substitute in the second innings.

Match 11
4 March 2024
19:30 (N)
Scorecard

Royal Challengers Bangalore; 198/3 (20 overs)	v	UP Warriorz; 175/8 (20 overs)
Smriti Mandhana 80 (50); Sophie Ecclestone 1/22 (4 overs)		Alyssa Healy 55 (38); Asha Sobhana 2/29 (4 overs); Sophie Molineux 2/29 (4 overs)

Royal Challengers Bangalore won by 23 runs
M. Chinnaswamy Stadium, Bengaluru
Umpires: Abhijeet Bengeri and Vrinda Rathi
Player of the match: Smriti Mandhana (Royal Challengers Bengaluru)

- UP Warriorz won the toss and elected to field.

Match 12
5 March 2024
19:30 (N)
Scorecard

Delhi Capitals; 192/4 (20 overs)	v	Mumbai Indians; 163/8 (20 overs)
Jemimah Rodrigues 69* (33); Pooja Vastrakar 1/20 (4 overs)		Amanjot Kaur 42 (27); Jess Jonassen 3/21 (4 overs)

Delhi Capitals won by 29 runs
Arun Jaitley Cricket Stadium, New Delhi
Umpires: Abhijit Bhattacharya and Narayanan Janani
Player of the match: Jemimah Rodrigues (Delhi Capitals)

- Mumbai Indians won the toss and elected to field.

Match 13
6 March 2024
19:30 (N)
Scorecard

Gujarat Giants; 199/5 (20 overs)	v	Royal Challengers Bangalore; 180/8 (20 overs)
Beth Mooney 85* (51); Sophie Molineux 1/32 (4 overs)		Georgia Wareham 48 (22); Ashleigh Gardner 2/23 (4 overs)

Gujarat Giants won by 19 runs
Arun Jaitley Cricket Stadium, New Delhi
Umpires: Puttarangaiah Jayapal and Gayathri Venugopalan
Player of the match: Beth Mooney (Gujarat Giants)

- Gujarat Giants won the toss and elected to bat.

Match 14
7 March 2024
19:30 (N)
Scorecard

Mumbai Indians; 160/6 (20 overs)	v	UP Warriorz; 118/9 (20 overs)
Nat Sciver-Brunt 45 (31); Chamari Athapaththu 2/27 (4 overs)		Deepti Sharma 53* (36); Saika Ishaque 3/27 (4 overs)

Mumbai Indians won by 42 runs
Arun Jaitley Cricket Stadium, New Delhi
Umpires: Mohit Krishnadas and Pashchim Pathak
Player of the match: Nat Sciver-Brunt (Mumbai Indians)

- Mumbai Indians won the toss and elected to bat.

Match 15
8 March 2024
19:30 (N)
Scorecard

UP Warriorz; 138/8 (20 overs)	v	Delhi Capitals; 137 (19.5 overs)
Deepti Sharma 59 (48); Radha Yadav 2/16 (3 overs)		Meg Lanning 60 (46); Deepti Sharma 4/19 (4 overs)

UP Warriorz won by 1 run
Arun Jaitley Cricket Stadium, New Delhi
Umpires: Parashar Joshi and Mohamed Rafi
Player of the match: Deepti Sharma (Delhi Capitals)

- UP Warriorz won the toss and elected to bat.
- Deepti Sharma (UP Warriorz) became the first Indian bowler to take a hat-trick in the Women's Premier League.

Match 16
9 March 2024
19:30 (N)
Scorecard

Gujarat Giants; 190/7 (20 overs)	v	Mumbai Indians; 191/3 (19.5 overs)
Dayalan Hemalatha 74 (40); Saika Ishaque 2/31 (4 overs)		Harmanpreet Kaur 95* (48); Tanuja Kanwar 1/21 (4 overs)

Mumbai Indians won by 7 wickets
Arun Jaitley Cricket Stadium, New Delhi
Umpires: Abhijeet Bengeri and Vrinda Rathi
Player of the match: Harmanpreet Kaur (Mumbai Indians)

- Gujarat Giants won the toss and elected to bat.
- Mumbai Indians qualified for the playoffs as a result of this match.

Match 17
10 March 2024
19:30 (N)
Scorecard

Delhi Capitals; 181/5 (20 overs)	v	Royal Challengers Bangalore; 180/7 (20 overs)
Jemimah Rodrigues 58 (36); Shreyanka Patil 4/26 (4 overs)		Richa Ghosh 51 (29); Alice Capsey 1/5 (1 over)

Delhi Capitals won by 1 run
Arun Jaitley Cricket Stadium, New Delhi
Umpires: Abhijit Bhattacharya and Narayanan Janani
Player of the match: Jemimah Rodrigues (Delhi Capitals)

- Delhi Capitals won the toss and elected to bat.
- Delhi Capitals qualified for the playoffs as a result of this match.

Match 18
11 March 2024
19:30 (N)
Scorecard

Gujarat Giants; 152/8 (20 overs)	v	UP Warriorz; 144/5 (20 overs)
Beth Mooney 74* (52); Sophie Ecclestone 3/38 (4 overs)		Deepti Sharma 88* (60); Shabnam Shakil 3/11 (4 overs)

Gujarat Giants won by 8 runs
Arun Jaitley Cricket Stadium, New Delhi
Umpires: Puttarangaiah Jayapal and Gayathri Venugopalan
Player of the match: Shabnam Shakil (Gujarat Giants)

- Gujarat Giants won the toss and elected to bat.

Match 19
12 March 2024
19:30 (N)
Scorecard

Mumbai Indians; 113 (19 overs)	v	Royal Challengers Bangalore; 115/3 (15 overs)
Sajeevan Sajana 30 (21); Ellyse Perry 6/15 (4 overs)		Ellyse Perry 40* (38); Hayley Matthews 1/11 (2 overs)

Royal Challengers Bangalore won by 7 wickets
Arun Jaitley Cricket Stadium, New Delhi
Umpires: Mohit Krishnadas and Pashchim Pathak
Player of the match: Ellyse Perry (Royal Challengers Bangalore)

- Royal Challengers Bangalore won the toss and elected to field.
- Royal Challengers Bangalore qualified for the playoffs as a result of this match while Gujarat Giants and UP Warriorz were eliminated.

Match 20
13 March 2024
19:30 (N)
Scorecard

Gujarat Giants; 126/9 (20 overs)	v	Delhi Capitals; 129/3 (13.1 overs)
Bharti Fulmali 42 (36); Minnu Mani 2/9 (2 overs)		Shafali Verma 71 (37); Tanuja Kanwar 2/20 (4 overs)

Delhi Capitals won by 7 wickets
Arun Jaitley Cricket Stadium, New Delhi
Umpires: Parashar Joshi and Mohamed Rafi
Player of the match: Shafali Verma (Delhi Capitals)

- Gujarat Giants won the toss and elected to bat.
- Delhi Capitals qualified for the final as a result of this match.

== Playoffs ==
The playoffs were held from 15 to 17 March 2024 at Arun Jaitley Cricket Stadium, New Delhi.

=== Bracket ===
Eliminator			Final
			1	Delhi Capitals	113 (18.3 overs)
2	Mumbai Indians	130/6 (20 overs)	EW	Royal Challengers Bangalore	115/2 (19.3 overs)
3	Royal Challengers Bangalore	135/6 (20 overs)

=== Eliminator ===
Eliminator
15 March 2024
19:30 (N)
Scorecard

Royal Challengers Bangalore; 135/6 (20 overs)	v	Mumbai Indians; 130/6 (20 overs)
Ellyse Perry 66 (50); Hayley Matthews 2/18 (4 overs); Nat Sciver-Brunt 2/18 (4 overs)		Harmanpreet Kaur 33 (30); Shreyanka Patil 2/16 (4 overs)

Royal Challengers Bangalore won by 5 runs
Arun Jaitley Cricket Stadium, New Delhi
Umpires: Parashar Joshi and Gayathri Venugopalan
Player of the match: Ellyse Perry (Royal Challengers Bangalore)

- Royal Challengers Bangalore won the toss and elected to bat.

=== Final ===
Final
17 March 2024
19:30 (N)
Scorecard

Delhi Capitals; 113 (18.3 overs)	v	Royal Challengers Bangalore; 115/2 (19.3 overs)
Shafali Verma 44 (27); Shreyanka Patil 4/12 (3.3 overs)		Ellyse Perry 35* (37); Shikha Pandey 1/11 (4 overs)

Royal Challengers Bangalore won by 8 wickets
Arun Jaitley Cricket Stadium, New Delhi
Umpires: Abhijit Bhattacharya and Gayathri Venugopalan
Player of the match: Sophie Molineux (Royal Challengers Bangalore)

- Delhi Capitals won the toss and elected to bat.

== Broadcasting ==
Sports18 was the TV broadcaster, while JioCinema was the digital broadcaster for the 2024 season.

== Statistics ==
Most runs
Runs	Player	Team
347	Ellyse Perry	Royal Challengers Bangalore
331	Meg Lanning	Delhi Capitals
309	Shafali Verma	Delhi Capitals
300	Smriti Mandhana	Royal Challengers Bangalore
295	Deepti Sharma	UP Warriorz

Most wickets
Wickets	Player	Team
13	Shreyanka Patil	Royal Challengers Bangalore
12	Asha Sobhana	Royal Challengers Bangalore
12	Sophie Molineux	Royal Challengers Bangalore
11	Jess Jonassen	Delhi Capitals
11	Marizanne Kapp	Delhi Capitals
11	Sophie Ecclestone	UP Warriorz

- Most Sixes: Shafali Verma (DC)
- Best Strike Rate: Georgia Wareham (RCB)
- Catch of the Season: Sajeevan Sajana
- Main Value Player: Deepti Sharma (UPW)
- Fair Play: Smriti Mandhana (Royal Challengers Bangalore)
