= 2024 Women's Premier League (cricket) final =

2024 WPL cricket tournament final in India

2024 Women's Premier League Final
- Event: 2024 Women's Premier League
Delhi Capitals	Royal Challengers Bangalore
113	115/2
18.3 overs	19.3 overs
- Royal Challengers Bangalore won by 8 wickets
- Date: 17 March 2024
- Venue: Arun Jaitley Cricket Stadium, New Delhi
- Player of the match: Sophie Molineux (Royal Challengers Bangalore)
- Umpires: Abhijit Bhattacharya and Gayathri Venugopalan
- Attendance: 29,717

The 2024 Women's Premier League Final was played on 17 March 2024 at the Arun Jaitley Cricket Stadium in New Delhi. The runner-up of previous season and table topper of this season, Delhi Capitals played in the final against the winner of this season's Eliminator, Royal Challengers Bengaluru to decide the winner of the 2024 season.

Royal Challengers Bengaluru won the match and the maiden title by defeating Delhi Capitals by eight wickets.

== Background ==
On 14 February 2024, the BCCI announced the schedule for the 2024 season of the Women's Premier League. Bengaluru and Delhi hosted the whole season with the playoffs and the Final being played at the Arun Jaitley Cricket Stadium, New Delhi.

== Road to the final ==
Delhi Capitals began their campaign with a loss against Mumbai Indians, in their first game at the Chinnaswamy stadium in Bengaluru. However, they regained momentum by securing victories against UP Warriorz and Royal Challengers Bengaluru, propelled them forward with 4 points. Their winning streak continued as they won against Gujarat Giants and Mumbai Indians, accumulating a total of 8 points, as they moved to the Delhi leg of the league stage. Despite a loss against UP Warriorz, they managed to top the table with two successive wins against Royal Challengers Bangalore and Gujarat Giants. They made it to the finals as the leaders of the points table at the end of the league stage.

Royal Challengers Bengaluru commenced their league stage campaign with a win against UP Warriorz, followed by a victory against Gujarat Giants, before losing to Delhi Capitals and Mumbai Indians back to back. They had a mixed showing in the second segment of the league stage in Delhi, winning two games while losing two games to Gujarat and Delhi. They made it to the playoffs stage where they defeated Mumbai Indians in the eliminator game to make it to the finals.

Delhi Capitals
vs
Royal Challengers Bengaluru
League Stage
Opponent
Scorecard
Result
Points
Match No.
Opponent
Scorecard
Result
Points
Mumbai Indians
23 February 2024
Lost
-
1
UP Warriorz
24 February 2024
Won
2
UP Warriorz
26 February 2024
Won
2
2
Gujarat Giants
27 February 2024
Won
4
Royal Challengers Bengaluru
29 February 2024
Won
4
3
Delhi Capitals
29 February 2024
Lost
4
Gujarat Giants
3 March 2024
Won
6
4
Mumbai Indians
2 March 2024
Lost
4
Mumbai Indians
5 March 2024
Won
8
5
UP Warriorz
4 March 2024
Won
6
UP Warriorz
8 March 2024
Lost
8
6
Gujarat Giants
6 March 2024
Lost
6
Royal Challengers Bengaluru
10 March 2024
Won
10
7
Delhi Capitals
10 March 2024
Lost
6
Gujarat Giants
13 March 2024
Won
12
8
Mumbai Indians
12 March 2024
Won
8

League progression
Team	Group matches								Playoffs	
Team	1	2	3	4	5	6	7	8	E	F
Delhi Capitals	0	2	4	6	8	8	10	12		L
Royal Challengers Bengaluru	2	4	4	4	6	6	6	8	W	W

Win	Loss	No result

- Note: The total points at the end of each group match are listed.
- Note: Click on the points (group matches) or W/L (playoffs) to see the match summary.
Playoff stage

Eliminator			Final
			1	Delhi Capitals	113 (18.3 overs)
2	Mumbai Indians	130/6 (20 overs)	EW	Royal Challengers Bangalore	115/2 (19.3 overs)
3	Royal Challengers Bangalore	135/6 (20 overs)

Qualified for the finals
Elimator

Opponent
Scorecard
Result
9
Mumbai Indians
15 March 2024
Won
2024 Women's Premier League final

== Match ==
=== Match officials ===
- On-field umpires: Abhijit Bhattacharya and Gayathri Venugopalan
- Third umpire: Parashar Joshi
- Reserve umpire: Pashchim Pathak
- Match referee: G. S. Lakshmi
- Toss: Delhi Capitals won the toss and elected to bat.

=== Summary ===
Final
17 March 2024
19:30 (N)
Scorecard

Delhi Capitals; 113 (18.3 overs)	v	Royal Challengers Bangalore; 115/2 (19.3 overs)
Shafali Verma 44 (27); Shreyanka Patil 4/12 (3.3 overs)		Ellyse Perry 35* (37); Shikha Pandey 1/11 (4 overs)

Royal Challengers Bangalore won by 8 wickets
Arun Jaitley Cricket Stadium, New Delhi
Umpires: Abhijit Bhattacharya and Gayathri Venugopalan
Player of the match: Sophie Molineux (Royal Challengers Bangalore)

- Delhi Capitals won the toss and elected to bat.

=== Delhi Capitals innings ===
Delhi Capitals Women won the toss and elected to bat first against Royal Challengers Bengaluru Women. The innings kicked off with promising starts from Meg Lanning and Shafali Verma, but soon faced a setback when Lanning fell victim to a lbw delivery by Shreyanka Patil after scoring 23 runs. Verma, however, showcased a brilliant display of batting, scoring 44 runs off just 27 deliveries, including 2 fours and 3 sixes, before being caught by Georgia Wareham off Sophie Molineux's bowling. The batting order suffered a collapse with quick dismissals of Jemimah Rodrigues, Alice Capsey, and Marizanne Kapp, all falling without adding any significant score, and the Capitals at 81 for the loss of six wickets. Despite contributions from Radha Yadav, Minnu Mani, and Arundhati Reddy, the team struggled to build partnerships. For the Royal Challengers, Patil and Molineux claimed 4 and 3 wickets respectively, while Asha Sobhana also chipped in with 2 crucial dismissals.

Delhi Capitals Women managed to post a total of 113 runs in their allotted 20 overs, with Shikha Pandey remaining unbeaten on 5 runs. However, the innings was marked by a lack of substantial partnerships and a flurry of wickets, causing their run rate to stagnate around 6.10. Royal Challengers Bengaluru Women's bowlers displayed a disciplined performance, and ensuring regular breakthroughs.

=== Royal Challengers Bengaluru innings ===
Chasing 114 to win, Royal Challengers Bengaluru Women embarked on their innings with Smriti Mandhana and Sophie Devine at the crease. Mandhana anchored the innings with a knock of 31 runs off 39 deliveries before being caught by Arundhati Reddy off Minnu Mani's bowling. Devine, on the other hand, provided the much-needed impetus to the innings, scoring a brisk 32 runs off 27 deliveries before being dismissed lbw by Shikha Pandey. However, their partnership laid a solid foundation for the chase. Ellyse Perry took charge of the innings thereafter, displaying her experience and skill to remain unbeaten on 35 runs off 37 balls, steering her team closer to victory. Richa Ghosh scored a quickfire 17 runs off 14 deliveries, ensuring there were no hiccups towards the end of the innings. Royal Challengers Bangalore Women chased down the target with 3 balls to spare, finishing at 115/2 in 19.3 overs, clinching the championship title of the 2024 Women's Premier League.

Royal Challengers' Sophie Molineux was declared the player of the match.

=== Scorecard ===
Source: ESPNcricinfo

Delhi Capitals innings
Player	Status	Runs	Balls	4s	6s	Strike rate
Meg Lanning	lbw Patil	23	23	3	0	100.00
Shafali Verma	c Wareham b Molineux	44	27	2	3	162.96
Jemimah Rodrigues	b Molineux	0	2	0	0	0.00
Alice Capsey	b Molineux	0	1	0	0	0.00
Marizanne Kapp	c Devine b Asha	8	16	0	0	50.00
Jess Jonassen	c Mandhana b Asha	3	11	0	0	27.27
Radha Yadav	run out Molineux	12	9	2	0	133.33
Minnu Mani	lbw Patil	5	3	1	0	166.67
Arundhati Reddy	b Patil	10	13	0	0	76.92
Shikha Pandey	not out	5	5	0	0	100.00
Taniya Bhatia	c Ghosh b Patil	0	1	0	0	0.00
Extras 3 (wd 3); Total 113 (18.3 overs)				8	3	5.65 RR

Fall of wickets: 64/1 (S. Verma, 7.1 ov), 64/2 (J. Rodrigues, 7.3 ov), 64/3 (A. Capsey, 7.4 ov), 74/4 (M. Lanning, 10.4 ov), 80/5 (M. Kapp, 13.1 ov), 81/6 (J. Jonassen, 13.3 ov), 87/7 (M. Mani, 14.1 ov), 101/8 (R. Yadav, 16.2 ov), 113/9 (A. Reddy, 18.2 ov), 113/10 (T. Bhatia, 18.3 ov)

Royal Challengers Bangalore bowling
Bowler	Overs	Maidens	Runs	Wickets	Econ	Wides	NBs
Renuka Singh	2	0	28	0	14.00	2	0
Sophie Molineux	4	0	20	3	5.00	0	0
Ellyse Perry	2	0	14	0	7.00	0	0
Sophie Devine	1	0	9	0	9.00	0	0
Georgia Wareham	3	0	16	0	5.33	0	0
Shreyanka Patil	3.3	0	12	4	3.42	0	0
Sobhana Asha	3	0	14	2	4.66	1	0

Royal Challengers Bangalore innings
Player	Status	Runs	Balls	4s	6s	Strike rate
Smriti Mandhana	c Reddy b Mani	31	39	3	0	79.49
Sophie Devine	lbw Pandey	32	27	5	1	118.52
Ellyse Perry	not out	35	37	4	0	94.59
Richa Ghosh	not out	17	14	2	0	121.43
Sabbineni Meghana	did not bat					
Georgia Wareham	did not bat					
Sophie Molineux	did not bat					
Disha Kasat	did not bat					
Shreyanka Patil	did not bat					
Sobhana Asha	did not bat					
Renuka Singh	did not bat					
Extras 0 Total 115/2 (19.3 overs)				14	1	5.89 RR

Fall of wickets: 49/1 (S. Devine, 8.1 ov), 82/2 (S. Mandhana, 14.6 ov)

Delhi Capitals bowling
Bowler	Overs	Maidens	Runs	Wickets	Econ	Wides	NBs
Marizanne Kapp	4	0	20	0	5.00	0	0
Alice Capsey	3	0	13	0	4.33	0	0
Shikha Pandey	4	0	11	1	2.75	0	0
Radha Yadav	1	0	18	0	18.00	0	0
Arundhati Reddy	3.3	0	26	0	7.42	0	0
Jess Jonassen	2	0	15	0	7.50	0	0
Minnu Mani	2	0	12	1	6.00	0	0
