= Abhishek Nayar =

Indian cricketer (born 1983)

Personal information
- Full name: Abhishek Mohan Nayar
- Born: 8 October 1983 (age 43); Secunderabad, Telangana, India
- Batting: Left-handed
- Bowling: Right-arm Medium
- Role: All-rounder

International information
- National side: India; (2009)
- ODI debut (cap 178): 3 July 2009 v West Indies
- Last ODI: 30 September 2009 v West Indies
- ODI shirt no.: 24

Domestic team information
- Years: Team
- 2005–2018: Mumbai
- 2008–2010: Mumbai Indians
- 2011–2012: Kings XI Punjab
- 2013: Pune Warriors India
- 2014–2015: Rajasthan Royals
- 2018: Pondicherry

Career statistics
Competition	ODI	FC	LA	T20
Matches	3	103	99	95
Runs scored	0	5,749	2,145	1,291
Batting average	–	45.62	31.08	21.51
100s/50s	0/0	13/32	2/10	0/3
Top score	0*	259	118	79
Balls bowled	18	12,412	3,043	679
Wickets	0	173	79	27
Bowling average	–	31.47	30.10	34.33
5 wickets in innings	–	6	1	0
10 wickets in match	–	0	0	0
Best bowling	–	7/131	6/28	3/13
Catches/stumpings	0/–	22/–	23/–	23/–
- Source: ESPNcricinfo, 3 November 2025

Abhishek Mohan Nayar (born 8 October 1983) is a former Indian international cricketer and is the current head coach of Kolkata Knight Riders and UP Warriorz. He is also the former Assistant Coach of Indian men's cricket team. He was an all-rounder who batted left-handed and bowled right-arm medium pace. He played first class cricket for Mumbai and Pondicherry, and played his 100th first-class match in November 2018. Nayar represented Mumbai Indians, Kings XI Punjab, Pune Warriors India, and Rajasthan Royals in the Indian Premier League.

== Domestic career ==
Some sources have described Nayar as a skilled right-arm medium-pacer who has also played an important role in helping Mumbai a crucial breakthrough in his young first-class career. His pace is not good enough for him to become a regular attacking option, however his left-hand batting abilities more than make up for his less than ideal pace to ensure that he becomes a natural choice. Capable of crease occupation, as well as hitting hard, Nayar chipped in with vital contributions in Mumbai's successful Ranji Trophy campaign in 2006.

The first-class century narrowly eluded him for a time - he made 97 against Gujarat in 2006 but when it came it was a big one, 152 against Karachi Urban in the Mohammad Nissar Trophy.

Nayar was bought by the lucrative Indian Premier League's Mumbai franchise in early 2008 and enjoyed regular playing time as the tournament kicked off. In the final of the 2008/09 Ranji Trophy, he made a vital 99 that helped set up Mumbai's 38th triumph, after being on the fringes of the national side.

He was the second highest run-scorer in the 2012/13 Ranji Trophy season scored 966 runs for Mumbai including three centuries and eight 50s. He also picked up 19 wickets to play an important role in the team's 40th Ranji Trophy title.

He selected to play for India A against Australia in a tour match in February. Nayar was not a part of the India A and Board President's XI squads which was announced earlier. In 2013, Nayar sent down 10 wides and a no-ball in a 17-ball over in the semi-final of the inter-zone Deodhar Trophy. He equal record of Mohammad Sami holds the record in ODIs with his famous 17-ball over against Bangladesh in an Asia Cup match in 2004. Nayar himself had handy figures of 7-0-49-2 with wickets of two specialist batsmen, Hanuma Vihari and CM Gautam. Nayar didn't look pleased with some of the wide calls, but later said it was more disappointment than dissent. Nayar came into bowl in the 12th over of South Zone's innings and began with the wicket of opener Vihari first ball. The wide malaise began with the third delivery of the over.

Fifth, sixth, seventh, ninth, 11th, 12th, 13th, 14th, and 15th were all wides. All bar one of those were off-side wides. Nayar even tried to shorten his run-up but to no avail.

He scored a century along with the Vijay Zol ensured India A held on for a draw against New Zealand "A" in Visakhapatnam on the final day in September 2013.

In Challenger Trophy 2013, he responded with a counterattacking 91 off 73 balls against Delhi as India Blues was reduced from 56 for 0 to 66 for 3. Against India Red, he scored unbeaten 75 off 39 balls as India Blues scored 345 runs in 50 overs.

After the 2018 IPL season, he was named as the mentor and head coach of the first-of-its-kind, KKR academy, to guide the youngsters of KKR during the off-season.

Ahead of the 2018–19 Ranji Trophy, he transferred from Mumbai to Puducherry. In November 2018, he played in his 100th first-class match.

== International career ==
He was named in India's squad for the ODI tour of the West Indies where he made his debut. He played in the last two ODIs but he didn't get a chance to bat or bowl in either. His first and only opportunity to bat as well as bowl came in his third and final ODI, in the group stage of 2009 Champions Trophy against West Indies. It was a low stakes match as India were already eliminated from the race to the semifinals. He came to bat when India were firmly in control of the game with 26 runs required in 22 overs with 7 wickets in Hand. Nayar faced 7 deliveries in total and played defensively, taking his time to get off the mark. Meanwhile, Virat Kohli, his batting partner, finished the game with some boundaries and quick runs before Nayar could score his first international run. Nayar also bowled three overs at 17 runs without picking a wicket.

== Coaching career ==
He is the current coach of UP Warriorz (WPL Team) and Kolkata Knight Riders.

== Personal life ==
Abhishek was born in Secunderabad to Keralite Mohan Nair and Lekha Nair. His parents were originally from Neyyattinkara in Kerala. He attended Bombay Scottish School in Mahim. He married Natasha Sheikh in 2014.
