= Meghna Singh =

Indian cricketer

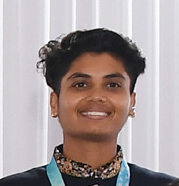
- Singh in August 2022

Personal information
- Full name: Meghna Singh
- Born: 18 June 1994 (age 32); Bijnor, Uttar Pradesh, India
- Batting: Right-handed
- Bowling: Right-arm medium
- Role: Bowler

International information
- National side: India
- Only Test (cap 90): 30 September 2021 v Australia
- ODI debut (cap 134): 21 September 2021 v Australia
- Last ODI: 18 September 2022 v England
- ODI shirt no.: 16
- T20I debut (cap 70): 29 July 2022 v Australia
- Last T20I: 11 December 2022 v Australia
- T20I shirt no.: 16

Domestic team information
- Years: Team
- 2012/13–2019/20: Uttar Pradesh
- 2017/18–present: Railways
- 2020: Velocity
- 2022: Supernovas

Career statistics
Competition	WTest	WODI	WT20I
Matches	1	15	7
Runs scored	2	27	1
Batting average	–	13.50	0.50
100s/50s	0/0	0/0	0/0
Top score	2*	12*	1
Balls bowled	126	644	93
Wickets	2	15	4
Bowling average	33.00	35.80	27.50
5 wickets in innings	0	0	0
10 wickets in match	0	0	0
Best bowling	2/54	3/26	1/6
Catches/stumpings	0/–	1/–	2/–
Medal record
Representing India
Women's Cricket
Commonwealth Games
Silver medal – second place	2022 Birmingham	Team
- Source: ESPNcricinfo, 25 January 2023

Meghna Singh (born 18 June 1994) is an Indian cricketer who plays for Railways. In August 2021, Singh earned her maiden call-up to the India women's cricket team, for their series against Australia, including being named in India's squad for the one-off women's Test match. She made her Women's One Day International (WODI) debut on 21 September 2021 against Australia. She made her Test debut on 30 September 2021, also against Australia.

In January 2022, she was named in India's team for the 2022 Women's Cricket World Cup in New Zealand. She was also named in India's Women's Twenty20 International (WT20I) squad for their one-off match against New Zealand.

In July 2022, she was named in India's team for the cricket tournament at the 2022 Commonwealth Games in Birmingham, England. In the opening match of that tournament she made her WT20I debut on 29 July 2022, against Australia.

In December 2023, she was signed by Gujarat Giants at the Women's Premier League auction, for the 2024 season.
