= Malolan Rangarajan =

Indian cricket coach and scout (born 1989)

Personal information
- Born: 22 April 1989 (age 37); Chennai, Tamil Nadu, India
- Height: 6 ft 0 in (1.83 m)
- Batting: Right-handed
- Bowling: Right-arm off break
- Role: Bowling all-rounder

Domestic team information
- Years: Team
- 2011–2018: Tamil Nadu
- 2018–2019: Uttarakhand

Career statistics
Competition	FC	LA	T20
Matches	47	10	2
Runs scored	1,379	123	28
Batting average	28.14	24.60	14.00
100s/50s	1/7	0/1	0/0
Top score	131	50	27
Balls bowled	8,069	495	30
Wickets	136	10	0
Bowling average	28.98	30.30	–
5 wickets in innings	5	0	–
10 wickets in match	1	0	–
Best bowling	7/135	2/12	–
Catches/stumpings	15/–	3/–	0/–
- Source: ESPNcricinfo

Malolan Rangarajan (born 22 April 1989) is an Indian professional cricket coach and scout. He is a former cricketer who played for Tamil Nadu and Uttarakhand in domestic cricket. Rangarajan was a bowling all-rounder who batted right-handed and bowled right-arm off break, and also represented South Zone cricket team. He took a five-for and scored a fifty against West Zone in the 2013/14 Duleep Trophy.

Ahead of the 2018–19 Ranji Trophy, Rangarajan transferred from Tamil Nadu to Uttarakhand. For the 2019–20 Ranji Trophy, he moved back to Tamil Nadu.

== Coaching career ==
Rangarajan was appointed the head of the talent scouting wing of the Indian Premier League team, Royal Challengers Bangalore, in 2019. The following year, he was appointed the assistant coach of the Caribbean Premier League side, St Kitts & Nevis Patriots, ahead of the 2020 season. In 2023, he was named the head coach. Earlier that year, he was named the assistant coach of the Royal Challengers Bangalore women's team competing in the Women's Premier League. He was also given the talent scouting responsibilities for the team. He became RCBW head coach in November 2025.
