= Shreyanka Patil =

Indian cricketer (born 2002)

Personal information
- Full name: Shreyanka Patil
- Born: 31 July 2002 (age 24); Bengaluru, Karnataka, India
- Batting: Right-handed
- Bowling: Right-arm off break
- Role: Bowler

International information
- National side: India (2023–present)
- ODI debut (cap 141): 30 December 2023 v Australia
- Last ODI: 2 January 2024 v Australia
- T20I debut (cap 80): 6 December 2023 v England
- Last T20I: 22 September 2026 v Sri Lanka
- T20I shirt no.: 31

Domestic team information
- Years: Team
- 2019–present: Karnataka
- 2023–present: Royal Challengers Bengaluru
- 2023: Guyana Amazon Warriors

Career statistics
Competition	T20I	LA	T20
Matches	2	18	42
Runs scored	4	170	222
Batting average	4.00	18.88	10.09
100s/50s	0/0	0/1	0/0
Top score	4	73	25
Balls bowled	26	848	769
Wickets	2	29	52
Bowling average	25.00	20.27	16.19
5 wickets in innings	0	0	0
10 wickets in match	0	0	0
Best bowling	2/44	3/30	4/7
Catches/stumpings	0/–	3/–	4/–
Medal record
Women's cricket
Representing India
Asian Games
Gold medal – first place	Aichi–Nagoya 2026
Asia Cup
Runner-up	2024 Sri Lanka	Team
- Source: CricketArchive, 20 February 2024

Shreyanka Patil (born 31 July 2002) is an Indian cricketer who currently plays for the national team. In domestic cricket, she represents Karnataka while she plays for the Royal Challengers Bengaluru in Women's Premier League. She plays as a right-arm off break bowler. She made her international debut for India in 2023.

== Early life ==
Patil was born on 31 July 2002 in Bengaluru. She picked up cricket when she was ten. Her father, Rajesh, runs a cricket academy. Patil experimented from bowling medium-pace to leg spin, before finding comfort as an off spinner. She then moved to a rented accommodation to hone her skills at Dev's academy in Huttanahalli in Karnataka. Patil's career as a professional cricketer began when she made the Karnataka under-16 squad.

== Domestic career ==
Patil made her debut for Karnataka senior team in October 2019, in a match against Pondicherry, in which she took 1/21 from two overs. In November 2022, she took 4/7 from four overs for South Zone against North East Zone in the Senior Inter Zonal T20 competition. She scored her maiden List A half-century in January 2023, making 73 against Arunachal Pradesh.

In February 2023, Patil was signed by Royal Challengers Bengaluru (RCB) for the inaugural Women's Premier League at a fee of ₹10 lakh (approx US$12,100 at the time). She took six wickets at an average of 32.00 in her seven matches at the tournament.

In August 2023, she was signed by Guyana Amazon Warriors for the 2023 Women's Caribbean Premier League. She was the leading wicket-taker in the tournament, with 9 wickets at an average of 11.66.

In the 2024 Women's Premier League, Patil won the Purple Cap as the highest wicket-taker in the tournament by picking 13 wickets in eight matches. With the figures of 4/12 in the final match against Delhi Capitals, she made an important contribution in the title win for Royal Challengers Bengaluru.

Patil was ruled out of the 2025 WPL edition with injuries. She was replaced in the RCB squad by fellow Indian off-spinner Sneh Rana.

Patil was one of four players retained by RCB ahead of the 2026 WPL Mega Auction. She was retained at a fee of ₹60 lakh (approx US$67,000 at the time) Returning from injury during the 2026 Women's Premier League, the Royal Challengers Bengaluru off-spinner took 11 wickets across 9 games at an economy of 9.02 as RCB sealed their second WPL title. Patil finished as the 9th highest wicket-taker in the season (3rd highest amongst RCB bowlers). This included a maiden five-wicket haul in a match against the Gujarat Giants. Her figures of 5/23 in this game ended up being the best for any bowler in the season.

== International career ==
In June 2023, Patil played for India A at the 2023 ACC Women's T20 Emerging Teams Asia Cup. She was the leading wicket-taker at the tournament, with 9 wickets, including taking 5/2 against Hong Kong and 4/13 in the final against Bangladesh A.

In December 2023, Patil earned her first call-up to the India squad for the side's series against England. She made her international debut in the first match of the Twenty20 International series, taking 2/44 from her four overs. Later that month, Patil got her maiden ODI call-up in the series against Australia. She made her Women's One Day International (WODI) debut for India on 30 December 2023, against Australia. She was named in the India squad for the 2024 ICC Women's T20 World Cup and their home ODI series against New Zealand in October 2024.

Patil was among the four player shortlist for the ICC Women's Emerging Cricketer of the Year 2024.

== Awards and nominations ==
Year	Award	Category	Result	Ref.
2024	Indian Sports Honours	Breakthrough Performance of the Year Female	Won	
