= UP Warriorz =

Indian franchise cricket team

- League: Women's Premier League

Personnel
- Captain: Meg Lanning
- Coach: Abhishek Nayar
- Owner: Capri Global

Team information
- City: Lucknow, Uttar Pradesh, India
- Colours: Purple and yellow
- Founded: 2023; 3 years ago
- Home ground: Ekana Cricket Stadium

History
- WPL wins: 0
T20I kit

UP Warriorz are an Indian professional franchise women's cricket team that compete in the Women's Premier League (WPL). The team is based in Lucknow, Uttar Pradesh, and is owned by Capri Global. They are coached by Abhishek Nayar.

UP Warriorz reached the eliminator in the inaugural season, where they were defeated by Mumbai Indians.

The team was captained by Alyssa Healy in the first two seasons. For the 2025 season, Deepti Sharma took over the captaincy after Healy was ruled out due to injury.

For the 2026 season, Meg Lanning was announced the new captain of the franchise after the successful Mega Auction.

== History ==
In October 2022, the BCCI announced its intentions to hold a five-team women's franchise cricket tournament in March 2023. The tournament was named the Women's Premier League in January 2023, with investors buying the rights to franchises through a closed bidding process during the same month. Capri Global bought the rights to one of the franchises, to be based in Lucknow, Uttar Pradesh.

In February 2023, Jon Lewis was announced as head coach of the team. The inaugural player auction for the WPL was held on 13 February 2023, with UP Warriorz signing 16 players for their squad. The team went on to finish third in the group stage of the inaugural edition of the WPL, qualifying for the eliminator. However, they lost to Mumbai Indians by 72 runs in the eliminator.

== Current squad ==
Name	Nationality	Birth date	Batting style	Bowling style	Notes
Deepti Sharma	India	24 August 1997 (age 29)	Left-handed	Right-arm off break	Vice-Captain
Harleen Deol	India	21 June 1998 (age 28)	Right-handed	Right-arm leg break	
Kranti Goud	India	11 August 2003 (age 23)	Right handed	Right-arm medium fast	
Meg Lanning	Australia	25 March 1992 (age 34)	Right-handed	Right-arm medium	Captain; Overseas Player
Phoebe Litchfield	Australia	18 April 2003 (age 23)	Right-handed	Right-arm leg break	Overseas Player
Pratika Rawal	India	1 September 2000 (age 26)	Right-handed	Right-arm off break	
Shikha Pandey	India	12 May 1989 (age 37)	Right-handed	Right-arm medium	
Shipra Giri	India	24 June 2002 (age 24)	Right-handed		
Simran Sheikh	India	12 January 2002 (age 24)	Right-handed	Right-arm leg break	
Sophie Ecclestone	England	6 May 1999 (age 27)	Right-handed	Slow left-arm orthodox	Overseas Player

== Kit manufacturers and sponsors ==
Year	Kit Manufacturer	Main shirt sponsor	Back sponsor
2023–2024	UYP	Patanjali	EaseMyTrip
2024–2025	UYP	Kay Beauty	EaseMyTrip
2025–2026	UYP	RR Signature	EaseMyTrip
2026–present	UYP	L'Oréal Professionnel	EaseMyTrip

== Support staff ==
Position	Name
Head coach	Abhishek Nayar
Assistant coach	Hitshu Bachani
Bowling coach	Alagh Pratibhan
Fielding coach	Saurabh Bandekar
Mentor	Lisa Sthalekar

== Seasons ==
Year	Played	Won	Lost	Success Rate	League standing	Final standing
2023	9	4	5	44.44	3/5	Playoffs
2024	8	3	5	37.50	4/5	League Stage
2025	8	3	5	37.50	5/5	League Stage
2026	8	2	6	25.00	5/5	League Stage

=== Head to Head Record ===
Opponent	Played	Won	Lost	Success Rate
Delhi Capitals	8	2	6	25.00
Gujarat Giants	8	3	5	37.50
Mumbai Indians	9	4	5	44.44
Royal Challengers Bengaluru	8	3	5	37.50
Total	33	12	21	36.36

== Captaincy record ==
Player	Duration	Matches	Won	Lost	Best Result
(Australia) Alyssa Healy	2023–2024	17	7	10	Playoffs (2023)
(India) Deepti Sharma	2025	8	3	5	5th (2025)
(Australia) Meg Lanning	2026–Present	8	2	6	5th (2026)
