= Puttarangaiah Jayapal =

Indian cricket umpire (born 1972)

Personal information
- Born: 19 September 1972 (age 54); KR Nagar, Mysore, Karnataka

Umpiring information
- WODIs umpired: 6 (2014–2019)
- WT20Is umpired: 3 (2012–2014)
- FC umpired: 37 (2011–2016)
- LA umpired: 23 (2008–2015)
- T20 umpired: 17 (2011–2015)
- Source: Cricketarchive, 30 December 2016

Puttarangaiah Jayapal (born 19 September 1972) is an Indian cricket umpire. He has featured as umpire in women's one day internationals and Twenty20 internationals.
