= Gujarat Giants (WPL) =

Indian women's cricket team

- League: Women's Premier League

Personnel
- Captain: Ashleigh Gardner
- Coach: Michael Klinger
- Owner: Adani Group

Team information
- City: Vadodara, Gujarat, India
- Colours: Orange and Gold
- Founded: 2023; 3 years ago
- Home ground: Baroda Cricket Association Stadium, Vadodara

History
- WPL wins: 0
- Official website: Gujarat Giants
T20I kit

The Gujarat Giants are an Indian professional women's cricket team that compete in the Women's Premier League (WPL), based in Vadodara, Gujarat. The team is owned by the Adani Sportsline, part of the Adani Group. The team is coached by Michael Klinger and captained by Ashleigh Gardner.

== History ==
In October 2022, the BCCI announced its intentions to hold a five-team women's franchise cricket tournament in March 2023. The tournament was named the Women's Premier League in January 2023, with investors buying the rights to franchises through a closed bidding process. The Adani Group, the owners of the Gujarat Giants kabaddi team, bought the rights to one of the franchises, which they would go on to also call Gujarat Giants.

The inaugural player auction for the WPL was held on 13 February 2023, with Gujarat Giants signing 18 players for their squad. Beth Mooney was appointed captain, but an injury in their very first game led to Sneh Rana replacing her as captain for the rest of the tournament. The side finished bottom of the group stage at the inaugural tournament.

In December 2023, Gujarat Giants acquired 10 players in the WPL Auction, which included Kashvee Gautam, Lauren Cheatle, Phoebe Litchfield, and Veda Krishnamurthy. However, before the tournament began, Lauren Cheatle and Kashvee Gautam were both ruled out due to injury. Lea Tahuhu and Sayali Satghare were their respective replacements.

In February 2024, Michael Klinger took over as the head coach of Gujarat Giants, replacing Rachael Haynes. Gujarat Giants began the second season of the WPL with a loss to Mumbai Indians and once again ended up at the bottom of the table. During the tournament, Harleen Deol got injured, leading to Bharti Fulmali replacing her midway through the season.

=== 2023 ===
The first season of the Women's Premier League began on 4th March 2023, with the match between Mumbai Indians and Gujarat Giants at the DY Patil Stadium in Navi Mumbai. Beth Mooney was injured in their first over of the second innings. She was replaced by Laura Wolvaardt in the squad.

Kim Garth, who was signed as a replacement for the injured Deandra Dottin, became only the second bowler after Tara Norris to pick up a 5-wicket haul in the WPL. She achieved the feat against UP Warriorz.

England opener Sophia Dunkley registered the fastest fifty in the history of the Women's Premier League, doing so against Royal Challengers Bengaluru.

Laura Wolvaardt scored 2 back-to-back fifties in the tournament. She scored 57 off 45 balls against Delhi Capitals and followed it up with 68 in 42 balls against Royal Challengers Bengaluru.

Ashleigh Gardner was the standout performer for the Gujarat Giants, finishing as their highest run-scorer while also being their second-highest wicket-taker. She scored 204 runs, which included 2 fifties, and took 10 wickets in 8 games. Kim Garth was the highest wicket-taker for the Gujarat Giants with 11 wickets.

=== 2024 ===
Ahead of the second season of the Women's Premier League, the Gujarat Giants appointed Michael Klinger as the coach of the side to replace Rachael Haynes. They added 10 players in the Auction: Phoebe Litchfield, Kashvee Gautam, Lauren Cheatle, Meghna Singh, Tarannum Pathan, Veda Krishnamurthy, Priya Mishra, Trisha Poojitha, Kathryn Bryce and Mannat Kashyap. Lauren Cheatle was later replaced by New Zealand's Lea Tahuhu, while Sayali Satghare replaced Kashvee Gautam.

Despite strong individual performances, the Giants had a similar run in the second season as they had in the first.

Gujarat Giants played their first game against Mumbai Indians on 25th February. They could only score 126/9 while batting first, and Mumbai chased it down in 18 overs. In their next match against Royal Challengers Bangalore, they could only score 107/7, and Bangalore chased it down within 13 overs. In their next match against UP Warriorz, they scored 142/5, and UP chased it down within 16 overs. Meghna Singh picked up 4 wickets against the Delhi Capitals, but the Giants lost by 25 runs. Laura Wolvaardt and Beth Mooney put on a 140-run stand in the game against Royal Challengers Bangalore, where Mooney scored 85 in 51 deliveries while Wolvaardt scored 76 in 45 balls. Gujarat won the match by 19 runs. Mooney scored 66 in her next game against Mumbai Indians while Dayalan Hemalatha scored 74 in 40 balls. Gujarat Giants scored 190 for 7 in their 20 overs. Harmanpreet Kaur scored 95 in 48 deliveries and Mumbai Indians won the game by 7 wickets. Mooney registered another 50 in the next game against UP Warriorz. She scored 74 in 52 balls to help the Giants score 152. Shabnam Shakil took 3 wickets for 11 runs and the Giants won the game by 8 runs. In their final league match against Delhi, they scored 126/9 while batting first, and Delhi chased it down in 13 overs.

Beth Mooney finished as the highest run-scorer for the Gujarat Giants, scoring 285 runs in 8 games, while Tanuja Kanwer was the highest wicket-taker with 10 wickets.

=== 2025 ===
2025 WPL Season Overview The third season of the Women's Premier League commenced on February 14, 2025, with Gujarat Giants taking on Royal Challengers Bengaluru at the newly-constructed BCA Stadium in Vadodara. This marked an important shift for the franchise as Ashleigh Gardner took over the captaincy from Beth Mooney, becoming the leading figure for the Giants in their pursuit of their first title.

=== Historic Playoff Qualification ===
Gujarat Giants displayed a significant improvement in the 2025 season compared to their previous campaigns. After two consecutive seasons of finishing at the bottom of the league table, the team made considerable progress, achieving a historic milestone by qualifying for the playoffs for the first time. They secured the third position in the league stage, demonstrating strong competitiveness by finishing the initial phase with an even record of 4 wins and 4 competitive fixtures.

=== Key Matches and Fierce Competition ===
- Season Opener (Vadodara): In their opening match against Royal Challengers Bengaluru, Gujarat Giants posted a massive 201/5 in their 20 overs—a powerful statement of intent. Captain Ashleigh Gardner produced a stellar performance, scoring 79 not out off 37 balls. While RCB successfully chased down the target by 6 wickets, the Giants proved they were a formidable high-scoring side.
- Bengaluru Leg: The Giants showcased their ability to adapt in the reverse fixture at the M. Chinnaswamy Stadium, registering a commanding 6-wicket victory over Royal Challengers Bengaluru. Gardner again led from the front with a match-winning 58 off 31 balls.
- Lucknow Leg: Later in the season at the Ekana Stadium, Gujarat Giants recorded a dominant 81-run victory over UP Warriorz. Beth Mooney remained unbeaten on 96, anchoring the innings, while the bowling attack led by Kashvee Gautam and Tanuja Kanwar delivered a clinical performance.

=== The Eliminator: A Strong Finish to the Campaign ===
Despite a strong mid-season run, Gujarat Giants’ inaugural playoff campaign concluded at the final hurdle. In the Eliminator on March 13 at the Brabourne Stadium in Mumbai, they faced Mumbai Indians. Mumbai Indians, setting a demanding target, posted 213/4, spearheaded by high scores from Hayley Matthews and Nat Sciver-Brunt. Gujarat Giants fought hard in their chase, managing 166 all out, marking a 47-run margin against the eventual finalists. The team demonstrated resilience and fighting spirit until the final over, confirming their place among the league's top contenders.

=== Statistical Milestones ===
The season saw major personal milestones for the leadership group. By the end of the 2025 campaign:

- Ashleigh Gardner solidified her status as a franchise legend, reaching a career tally of 567 runs and 25 matches played for the Giants since 2023.
- Beth Mooney continued her consistency, crossing the 500-run mark for the franchise (522 runs in 18 career matches), with her unbeaten 96 against UP Warriorz standing out as a season highlight.

=== Gujarat Giants WPL 2026 Squad (The New Roster) ===
Following a major Mega Auction held on November 27, 2025, the Gujarat Giants dramatically restructured their squad, retaining only two key players. Their 2026 campaign will be built around this new roster, focusing on key international experience and new Indian pace talent.

The Women's Premier League 2026 season is set to commence on January 9, 2026.

Role	Name	Nationality
Batter	Danni Wyatt-Hodge	England
Batter	Bharti Fulmali	India
Batter	Anushka Sharma	India
All-Rounder	Ashleigh Gardner	Australia
All-Rounder	Tanuja Kanwar	India
All-Rounder	Sophie Devine	New Zealand
All-Rounder	Georgia Wareham	Australia
All-Rounder	Kim Garth	Australia
All-Rounder	Kanika Ahuja	India
All-Rounder	Ayushi Soni	India
Wicket-keeper	Beth Mooney	Australia
Wicket-keeper	Yastika Bhatia	India
Wicket-keeper	Shivani Singh	India
Bowler	Kashvee Gautam	India
Bowler	Renuka Singh	India
Bowler	Rajeshwari Gayakwad	India
Bowler	Titas Sadhu	India
Bowler	Happy Kumari	India

=== Key Roster Changes ===
- Retentions: Only Captain Ashleigh Gardner and Beth Mooney were retained, forming the core leadership.
- Big Buys: The team invested heavily in world-class players like New Zealand veteran Sophie Devine and Indian pace spearhead Renuka Singh.
- Notable Releases: The Giants released several 2025 players including Laura Wolvaardt, Deandra Dottin, Phoebe Litchfield, and Harleen Deol.

== Support staff ==
Position	Name
Head coach	Michael Klinger
Batting coach	Daniel Marsh
Bowling coach	Pravin Tambe
Fielding coach	Sarah Taylor

Source: Official website

== Kit manufacturers and sponsors ==
Year	Kit manufacturer	Main shirt sponsor	Back sponsor
2023–2025	T10 Sports	Ambuja Cement	Fortune
2025–present	UYP	Ambuja Cement	Fortune

== Seasons ==
Year	Played	Won	Loss	Success Rate	League table standing	Final standing
2023	8	2	6	25.00	5/5	League Stage
2024	8	2	6	25.00	5/5	League Stage
2025	9	4	5	44.44	3/5	Playoffs
2026	9	5	4	55.56	2/5	Playoffs

=== Head to Head Records ===
Opponent	Played	Won	Loss	Success Rate
Delhi Capitals	9	4	5	44.44
Mumbai Indians	9	1	8	11.11
Royal Challengers Bengaluru	8	3	5	37.50
UP Warriorz	8	5	3	62.50
Total	34	13	21	38.24

== Honours ==
Year	Award	Recipient
2025	Most Sixes	Ashleigh Gardner
2025	Fair Play Award	Gujarat Giants

== Captaincy record ==
Player	Duration	Matches	Won	Lost	Best Result
(India) Sneh Rana	2023	7	2	5	5th (2023)
(Australia) Beth Mooney	2023–2024	9	2	7	5th (2024)
(Australia) Ashleigh Gardner	2025–present	18	9	9	Playoffs (2025, 2026)
