= Pashchim Pathak =

Indian cricket umpire (born 1976)

Personal information
- Full name: Pashchim Girish Pathak
- Born: 17 November 1976 (age 49); Bombay, Maharashtra
- Role: Umpire

Umpiring information
- WODIs umpired: 4 (2012–2018)
- Source: Cricinfo, 5 March 2023

Pashchim Girish Pathak (born 17 November 1976) is an Indian cricket umpire. He stood in eight Indian Premier League games since 2014. He stood in two Women's One Day International matches in 2012. Pathak has officiated in Indian domestic cricket since 2009 was the reserve umpire for two Test matches and three men's ODIs in India.
