= Dayalan Hemalatha =

Indian cricketer (born 1994)

Personal information
- Full name: Dayalan Hemalatha
- Born: 29 September 1994 (age 32); Madras, India
- Batting: Right-handed
- Bowling: Right-arm off break
- Role: All-rounder

International information
- National side: India
- ODI debut (cap 125): 11 September 2018 v Sri Lanka
- Last ODI: 24 September 2022 v England
- ODI shirt no.: 9
- T20I debut (cap 60): 9 November 2018 v New Zealand
- Last T20I: 15 October 2022 v Sri Lanka
- T20I shirt no.: 9

Domestic team information
- Years: Team
- 2011/12–2019/20: Tamil Nadu
- 2019–2020: Trailblazers
- 2020/21–present: Railways
- 2023–present: Gujarat Giants
- 2024/25: Perth Scorchers

Career statistics
| Competition | WODI | WT20I |
|---|---|---|
| Matches | 9 | 15 |
| Runs scored | 58 | 90 |
| Batting average | 11.60 | 9.00 |
| 100s/50s | 0/0 | 0/0 |
| Top score | 35 | 20 |
| Balls bowled | 178 | 122 |
| Wickets | 5 | 9 |
| Bowling average | 35.60 | 14.66 |
| 5 wickets in innings | 0 | 0 |
| 10 wickets in match | 0 | 0 |
| Best bowling | 2/6 | 3/15 |
| Catches/stumpings | 3/– | 1/– |
Medal record
Representing India
Women's Cricket
Women's Asia Cup
| Winner | 2022 Bangladesh |
| Runner-up | 2024 Sri Lanka |
- Source: ESPNcricinfo, 18 October 2022

Dayalan Hemalatha (born 29 September 1994) is an Indian cricketer. She is a right-handed batter and bowls right-arm off-break. She plays domestic cricket for Railways, and has previously played for Tamil Nadu and South Zone.

In March 2018, she was named in India's Women's One Day International (WODI) squad for their series against England, but she did not play. She made her WODI debut against Sri Lanka on 11 September 2018.

In October 2018, she was named in India's squad for the 2018 ICC Women's World Twenty20 tournament in the West Indies. She made her Women's Twenty20 International (WT20I) debut against New Zealand on 9 November 2018.

She was named in the India squad for the 2024 ICC Women's T20 World Cup and their home ODI series against New Zealand in October 2024.
