= Vrinda Rathi =

Indian cricket umpire (born 1989)

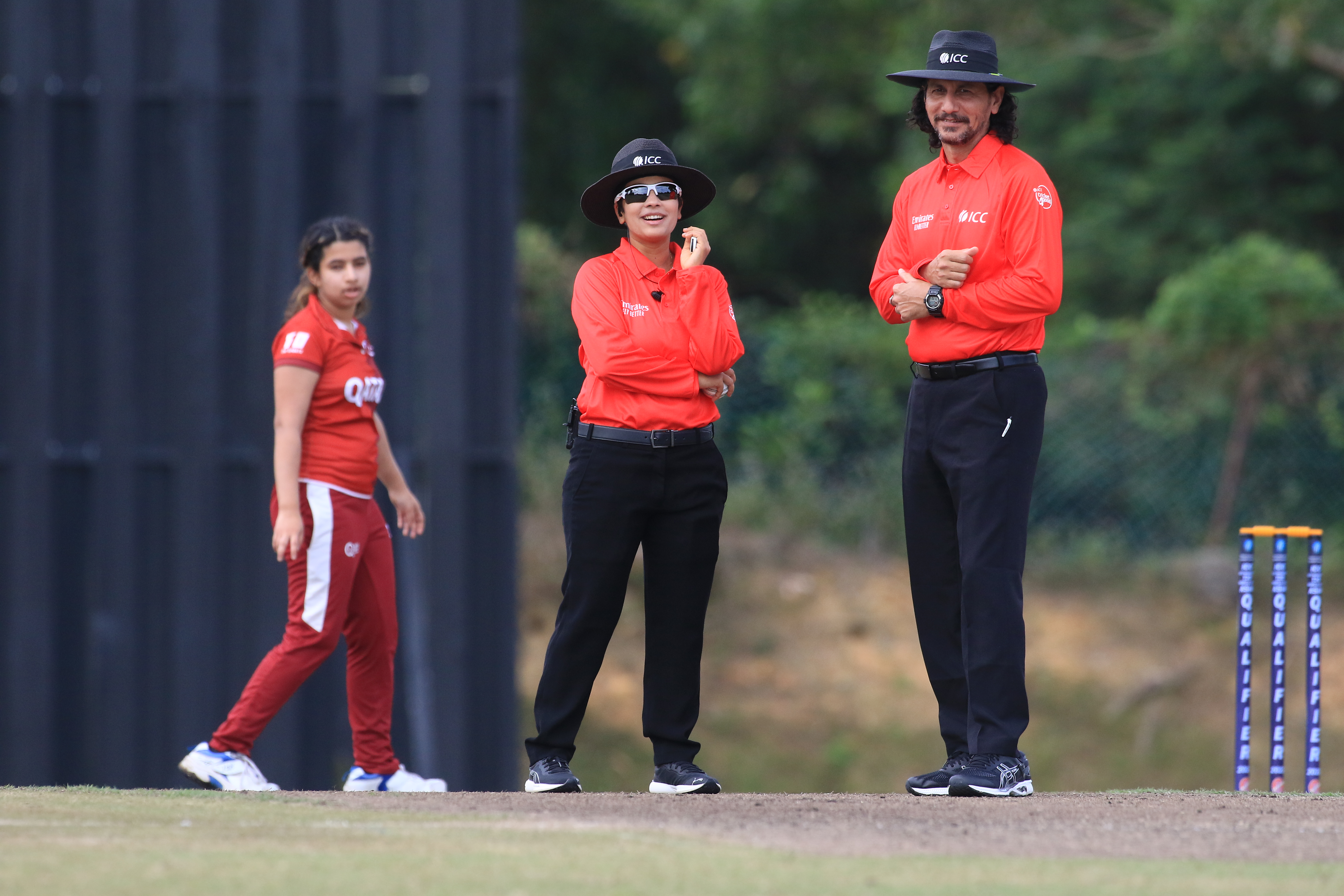

Personal information
- Full name: Vrinda Ghanshyam Rathi
- Born: 14 February 1989 (age 37); Navi Mumbai, India
- Role: Umpire

Umpiring information
- T20Is umpired: 14 (2023–2024)
- WTests umpired: 1 (2023)
- WODIs umpired: 19 (2023–2026)
- WT20Is umpired: 55 (2022–2026)
- FC umpired: 3 (2023–2024)
- Source: ESPNcricinfo, 19 November 2024

Vrinda Ghanshyam Rathi (born 14 February 1989) is an Indian cricket umpire. She is currently a member of Development Panel of ICC Umpires. She was one of the female umpires named by the ICC to stand in matches in the 2023 ICC Women's T20 World Cup.

On 10 January 2023, she along with Narayanan Janani and Gayathri Venugopalan became the first woman umpires to stand as an on-field umpire in a men's domestic fixture in India, when she was one of the umpires in the match between Goa and Pondicherry in the 2022–23 Ranji Trophy.

In September 2024 she was named as part of an all-female officiating group for the 2024 ICC Women's T20 World Cup.

== See also ==
- List of Twenty20 International cricket umpires
