= Richa Ghosh =

Indian cricketer (born 2003)

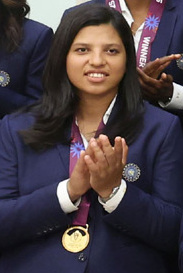
- Ghosh in 2025

Personal information
- Born: 28 September 2003 (age 23); Siliguri, West Bengal, India
- Batting: Right-handed
- Bowling: Right-arm medium
- Role: Wicket-keeper batter

International information
- National side: India (2020–present)
- Test debut (cap 94): 21 December 2023 v Australia
- Last Test: 28 June 2024 v South Africa
- ODI debut (cap 133): 21 September 2021 v Australia
- Last ODI: 2 November 2025 v South Africa
- ODI shirt no.: 13
- T20I debut (cap 65): 12 February 2020 v Australia
- Last T20I: 22 September 2026 v Sri Lanka
- T20I shirt no.: 13

Domestic team information
- Years: Team
- 2019–present: Bengal
- 2020–2022: Trailblazers
- 2021/22: Hobart Hurricanes
- 2023: London Spirit
- 2023–present: Royal Challengers Bangalore

Career statistics
Competition	WTest	WODI	WT20I
Matches	2	46	67
Runs scored	151	1041	1067
Batting average	50.33	29.74	27.35
100s/50s	0/2	0/7	0/2
Top score	86	96	64
Catches/stumpings	0/1	33/8	35/29
Medal record
Women's cricket
Representing India
ICC Cricket World Cup
Winner	2025 India
ICC T20 World Cup
Runner-up	2020 Australia
Asian Games
Gold medal – first place	2022 Hangzhou
Gold medal – first place	Aichi–Nagoya 2026
ACC Asia Cup
Winner	2022 Bangladesh
Winner	2026 UAE
Runner-up	2024 Sri Lanka
ICC U19 T20 World Cup
Winner	2023 South Africa
- Source: ESPNcricinfo, 4 December 2025

Richa Ghosh (born 28 September 2003) is an Indian international cricketer. She plays in the India women's national team as a wicket-keeper-batter. She represents Bengal in domestic cricket and Royal Challengers Bengaluru in the Women's Premier League. Ghosh was part of the Indian team that won the 2025 Women's Cricket World Cup, 2022 Women's Asia Cup, and gold medal at the 2022 Asian Games.

== Career ==
In 2020, at the age of 16, she was named in India's squad for the 2020 T20 World Cup. Later in the same month, she was also named in India's squad for the 2020 Tri-Nation Series. On 12 February 2020, she made her T20I debut for India, against Australia, in the final of the tri-series. In May 2021, she was awarded a central contract for the first time.

In August 2021, Ghosh was called up to the national team, for their series against Australia. She was named in India's squad for the one-off Test match and ODI matches. She made her ODI debut on 21 September 2021 against Australia.

She played for the Hobart Hurricanes in the 2021–22 Big Bash League season. In January 2022, she was named in India's team for the 2022 ODI World Cup in New Zealand.

Ghosh was signed by Royal Challengers Bangalore for ₹1.90 crore for the 2023 Women's Premier League. In December 2023, she was named in India's squad for their series against Australia. She made her Test debut for India on 21 December 2023, scoring 52 runs in the first innings and 13 in the second. She was named in the India squad for the 2024 T20 World Cup.

On 19 December 2024, Richa Ghosh scored the joint fastest-fifty in women's T20Is taking India to their highest-ever total in the format during 3rd T20I vs West Indies Women's.

Ghosh represented India at the 2025 World Cup. In the match against South Africa she scored 94 to recover the innings from 102/6, this innings broke the Women's ODI record for highest score by a number 8 batter.

== Off the field ==
Following her World Cup success, Ghosh was appointed as an honorary Deputy Superintendent of Police with the West Bengal Police on 4 December 2025. She assumed duties as an Assistant Commissioner of Police in the Siliguri Police Commissionerate.
