= Mumbai Indians (WPL) =

Indian women's cricket team

- League: Women's Premier League

Personnel
- Captain: Harmanpreet Kaur
- Coach: Lisa Keightley
- Owner: Reliance Industries

Team information
- City: Mumbai, Maharashtra, India
- Colours: Blue and Gold
- Founded: 2023; 3 years ago
- Home ground: Wankhede Stadium, Mumbai
- Capacity: 33,100

History
- WPL wins: 2 (2023, 2025)
- Official website: mumbaiindians.com
T20 kit

The Mumbai Indians are an Indian professional franchise women's cricket team that compete in the Women's Premier League (WPL), based in Mumbai, Maharashtra. The team is owned by India's biggest conglomerate Reliance Industries, through its 100% subsidiary Indiawin Sports that also owns the men's team, winning the rights to own and operate the Mumbai-based franchise for a sum of ₹912.99 crore (US$95 million). The team is coached by Lisa Keightley and captained by Harmanpreet Kaur. The team won the inaugural and the 2025 edition of the WPL, both times beating Delhi Capitals in the final.

== History ==
In October 2022, the BCCI announced its intentions to hold a five-team women's franchise cricket tournament in March 2023. The tournament was named the Women's Premier League in January 2023, with investors buying the rights to franchises through a closed bidding process during the same month. Indiawin Sports, the owners of Mumbai Indians in the Indian Premier League, bought the rights to one of the franchises.

In February 2023, Charlotte Edwards was announced as head coach of the team, with Jhulan Goswami named as their bowling coach and mentor and Devika Palshikar as the batting coach. The inaugural player auction for the WPL was held on 13 February 2023, with Mumbai Indians signing 18 players for their squad.

In March 2023, The Mumbai Indians, captained by Harmanpreet Kaur, went on to win the inaugural edition of the WPL, finishing second in the initial group stage before beating UP Warriorz in the eliminator and Delhi Capitals in the final. Mumbai Indians all-rounder Hayley Matthews was named Player of the Tournament.

In March 2025, the Mumbai Indians created history and became the first team to win multiple WPL trophies. Harmanpreet Kaur led the team to clinch their title for the second time. The captain was awarded player of the match, and the team extended dominance to win the orange and purple cap; the holders being Nat Sciver-Brunt and Amelia Kerr respectively.

In September 2025, Lisa Keightley was named the new head coach after Charlotte Edwards resigned to become coach of the England team.

== Current squad ==
Name	Nationality	Birth date	Batting style	Bowling style	Notes
Harmanpreet Kaur	India	8 March 1989 (age 37)	Right-handed	Right-arm off break	Captain
Nicola Carey	Australia	10 September 1993 (age 33)	Left-handed	Right-arm medium	Overseas player
Rahila Firdous	India	5 March 1998 (age 28)	Right-handed	—N/a	Wicket-keeper
Sanskriti Gupta	India	2 December 2004 (age 21)	Left-handed	Right-arm off break	
Milly Illingworth	Australia	15 July 2005 (age 21)	Right-handed	Right-arm fast	Overseas player
Saika Ishaque	India	8 October 1995 (age 31)	Left-handed	Slow left-arm orthodox	
Shabnim Ismail	South Africa	5 October 1988 (age 38)	Right-handed	Right-arm fast	Overseas player
G Kamalini	India	20 July 2008 (age 18)	Left-handed	Left-arm leg break	Wicket-keeper
Amanjot Kaur	India	1 January 2000 (age 26)	Right-handed	Right-arm medium	
Amelia Kerr	New Zealand	13 October 2000 (age 26)	Right-handed	Right-arm leg break	Overseas player
Poonam Khemnar	India	9 May 1994 (age 32)	Right-handed	Right-arm leg break	
Hayley Matthews	West Indies	19 March 1998 (age 28)	Right-handed	Right-arm off break	Overseas player
Nalla Kranthi Reddy	India	13 August 2004 (age 22)	Right-handed	Right-arm medium	
Sajeevan Sajana	India	4 January 1995 (age 31)	Right-handed	Right-arm off break	
Nat Sciver-Brunt	England	20 August 1992 (age 34)	Right-handed	Right-arm medium	Overseas player
Triveni Vasistha	India	30 May 2007 (age 19)	Left-handed	Slow left-arm orthodox	
Vaishnavi Sharma	India	18 December 2005 (age 20)	Left-handed	Slow left-arm orthodox	

== Support staff ==
Position	Name
Head coach	Lisa Keightley
Bowling coach & Mentor	Jhulan Goswami
Batting coach	Devika Palshikar
Fielding coach	Nicole Bolton
Spin bowling coach	Kristen Beams

Source: Official website

== Kit manufacturers and sponsors ==
Year	Kit manufacturer	Main shirt sponsor	Back sponsor
2023–2024	Performax	Lotus Herbals	Ashok Leyland
2024–2027	Skechers	Lotus Herbals	Ashok Leyland
2027–present	Nike		

== Seasons ==
Year	Played	Won	Lost	Success Rate	League standings	Final standings
2023	10	8	2	80.00	2/5	Champions
2024	9	5	4	55.56	2/5	Playoffs
2025	10	7	3	70.00	2/5	Champions
2026	8	3	5	37.50	4/5	League stage
Total	37	23	14	62.16	Two-time champions	

=== Head to Head Records ===
Opponent	Played	Won	Lost	Success Rate
Delhi Capitals	10	5	5	50.00
Gujarat Giants	9	8	1	88.89
Royal Challengers Bengaluru	9	5	4	55.56
UP Warriorz	9	5	4	55.56

== See also ==
- Mumbai Indians
- Sports in Maharashtra
