= Royal Challengers Bengaluru (WPL) =

Bengaluru based franchise in the Women's Premier League

- Nickname: RCB
- League: Women's Premier League

Personnel
- Captain: Smriti Mandhana (2023–present)
- Coach: Malolan Rangarajan (2025–present)
- Owner: Aditya Birla Group

Team information
- City: Bengaluru, Karnataka, India
- Colours
- Founded: 2023; 3 years ago
- Home ground: M. Chinnaswamy Stadium
- Capacity: 33,800

History
- WPL wins: 2 (2024, 2026)
- Official website: Website
Regular kit

Royal Challengers Bengaluru, commonly known by the abbreviation RCB always, is an Indian professional franchise cricket team based in Bengaluru, Karnataka that competes in the Women's Premier League. It is owned by Aditya Birla Group, which also owns the Men's team. The team is coached by Malolan Rangarajan and captained by Smriti Mandhana. RCB won the 2024 season, bringing the first trophy for the franchise. It is also the most popular and followed cricket franchise on Instagram with more than 21 million followers.

== History ==
In October 2022, the BCCI announced its intentions to hold a five-team women's franchise cricket tournament in March 2023. The tournament was named the Women's Premier League in January 2023, with investors buying the rights to franchises through a closed bidding process during the same month. Diageo, the owners of Royal Challengers Bengaluru in the Indian Premier League, bought the rights to one of the franchises.

In February 2023, Ben Sawyer was announced as head coach of the team. The inaugural player auction for the WPL was held on 13 February 2023, Royal Challengers Bangalore signing 18 players for their squad. On 18 February 2023, Smriti Mandhana was announced as the team's captain. The team finished fourth in the group stage at the inaugural tournament.

In September 2023, Luke Williams was announced as the head coach for the 2024 season. The team won three of their five Bengaluru-leg matches, and then they went on to win one match out of their next three matches. Ending the league stage with four wins, the team qualified for the playoffs.

In the eliminator, the team defeated the defending champions — Mumbai Indians, to advance into the final. In the final, they defeated Delhi Capitals to win the title, this was the franchise's maiden title across both men's and women's leagues. Royal Challengers Bengaluru's Ellyse Perry and Shreyanka Patil won the orange cap and purple cap respectively.

On 5 February 2026, Royal Challengers Bengaluru defeated the Delhi Capitals in a thrilling final to secure the WPL 2026 title. Chasing a target of 204, RCB hunted it down in 19.4 overs with 6 wickets in hand to clinch their second championship in three years.

== Players ==
Number	Role	Nationality	Name
18	Batter	India	Smriti Mandhana (C)
13	Batter	Australia	Georgia Voll
56	All-rounder	India	Arundhati Reddy
42	All-rounder	India	Dayalan Hemalatha
99	All-rounder	India	Gautami Naik
99	All-rounder	Australia	Grace Harris
17	All-rounder	South Africa	Nadine de Klerk
88	All-rounder	India	Pooja Vastrakar
90	All-rounder	India	Prema Rawat
10	All-rounder	India	Radha Yadav
33	All-rounder	India	Sayali Satghare
21	All-rounder	India	Shreyanka Patil
8	Bowler	England	Lauren Bell
44	Bowler	England	Linsey Smith
55	Wicket-keeper	India	Prathyoosha Kumar
36	Wicket-keeper	India	Richa Ghosh

== Coaching staff ==
Position	Name
Chief operating officer	Rajesh Menon
Head coach	Malolan Rangarajan
Assistant coach	Anya Shrubsole
Assistant coach	Sunetra Paranjpe
Batting coach	RX Muralidhar
Health Athletic Therapist	Navnita Gautam
Team doctor	Harini Muralidharan
Team manager	Harini Muralidharan
Head Physio	Sabyasachi Sahoo
Assistant Physio	Mitra Amin
Source Official Website

== Seasons ==
Year	League Standings	Final Standings	Most Runs	Most Wickets
2023	4/5	League Stage	Sophie Devine	Shreyanka Patil
2024	3/5	Champions	Ellyse Perry	Shreyanka Patil
2025	4/5	League Stage	Ellyse Perry	Georgia Wareham
2026	1/5	Champions	Smriti Mandhana	Nadine de Klerk
Total	Champions x 2		Smriti Mandhana	Shreyanka Patil

=== Captaincy record ===
Player	Duration	Matches	Won	Lost	Win Percentage	Best Result
Smriti Mandhana	2023–present	35	18	17	51.42%	Champions (2024, 2026)

== Honours ==
=== Women's Premier League ===
Year	Award	Recipient	Ref
2023	Most Sixes	Sophie Devine	
2024	Orange Cap	Ellyse Perry	
2024	Purple Cap	Shreyanka Patil	
2024	Best Strike Rate	Georgia Wareham	
2024	Emerging Player of the Season	Shreyanka Patil	
2024	Fair Play Award	Royal Challengers Bengaluru	
2026	Orange Cap	Smriti Mandhana	
2026	Best Strike Rate	Grace Harris	

=== Others ===
Year	Award	Category	Result	Ref
2024	Indian Sports Honours	Club of the Year	Nominated	

== Kits and sponsorship ==
The official colours of Royal Challengers Bengaluru are red, black and gold.

2023–present

Kajaria Tiles was the official title sponsor of Royal Challengers Bengaluru in the inaugural WPL season in 2023. Mia by Tanishq and Dream11 served as principal partners, while Puma, Himalaya and Vega were associate partners. Zuno General Insurance was the official insurance partner for the 2023 season.

Year	Kit manufacturer	Front sponsor	Back sponsor
2023–2025	Puma	Kajaria	Mia
2025–2026	Puma	Kajaria	Alliance University
2026–present	Puma	Kajaria	Kalyan Jewellers

== See also ==
- Sports in Karnataka
