= Delhi Capitals (WPL) =

Indian women's cricket team

- League: Women's Premier League

Personnel
- Captain: Jemimah Rodrigues
- Coach: Jonathan Batty
- Owner: GMR Group; JSW Group

Team information
- City: New Delhi, Delhi, India
- Colours: Blue and red
- Founded: 2023; 3 years ago
- Home ground: Arun Jaitley Cricket Stadium, New Delhi

History
- WPL wins: 0
- Official website: delhicapitals.in
T20 kit

The Delhi Capitals is an Indian professional women's cricket team that competes in the Women's Premier League, based in New Delhi, Delhi. The team is owned jointly by the GMR Group and the JSW Group, which also own the Capitals men's team. The team is coached by Jonathan Batty and captained by Jemimah Rodrigues. The team reached the final of the WPL but lost to Mumbai Indians.

== History ==
In October 2022, the BCCI announced its intentions to hold a five-team women's franchise cricket tournament in March 2023. The tournament was named the Women's Premier League in January 2023, with investors buying the rights to franchises through a closed bidding process during the same month. GMR Group and JSW Group, the owners of Delhi Capitals in the Indian Premier League, bought the rights to one of the franchises.

In February 2023, Jonathan Batty was announced as head coach of the team. The inaugural player auction for the WPL was held on 13 February 2023, with Delhi Capitals signing 18 players for their squad. At the inaugural tournament, Delhi Capitals qualified directly for the final after topping the group, winning six of their eight matches. However, they lost in the final to Mumbai Indians by seven wickets.

Under the leadership of Jemimah Rodrigues in 2026 Women's Premier League (cricket), Delhi Capitals defeated Gujarat Giants to reach their fourth consecutive WPL final, setting up championship match against Royal Challengers Bangalore.

== Support staff ==
Position	Name
Head coach	Jonathan Batty
Assistant coach	Hemlata Kala
Fielding coach	Milap Mewada

Source: Official website

== Kit manufacturers and sponsors ==
Year	Kit manufacturer	Main shirt sponsor	Back sponsor
2023–2024	Wrogn	JSW Paints	SportsBuzz11
2024–2026	Puma	DP World	JSW Paints
2026–present	Puma	DP World	Lakmé Sun Expert

== Seasons ==
Year	Group standings	Final standings
2023	1/5	Runners-up
2024	1/5	Runners-up
2025	1/5	Runners-up
2026	3/5	Runners-up

== Captaincy record ==
Player	Duration	Matches	Won	Lost	Best Result
(Australia) Meg Lanning	2023–2025	27	17	10	Runner-up (2023, 2024, 2025)

== See also ==
- Sport in Delhi
- Pretoria Capitals
- Dubai Capitals
